= Remulla =

Remulla is a surname. Notable people with this surname include:

- Abeng Remulla (born 1993), Filipino politician who has served as the 34th governor of Cavite since 2025
- Crispin Diego Remulla (born 1990), Filipino politician who has served as the representative for Cavite's seventh district since 2023
- Deanna Marie Remulla Maté (born 2001), Filipino singer, songwriter, record producer, model and beauty pageant titleholder
- Jesus Crispin Remulla (born 1961), lawyer and politician who has served as the 59th secretary of justice since 2022
- Jonvic Remulla (born 1967), Filipino politician who has served as the 42nd secretary of the interior and local government since 2024
- Juanito Remulla Sr. (1933–2014), Filipino lawyer and politician who served as the longest sitting governor of Cavite
