= 2025 Cavite local elections =

- May 12, 2025
- Gubernatorial election
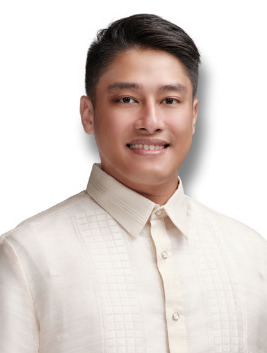
		IND
Candidate	Abeng Remulla	Weng Aguinaldo
Party	NUP	Independent
Running mate	Ram Bautista	—
Popular vote	1,058,412	270,207
Percentage	73.56	18.78
Governor before election
Athena Tolentino
NUP
Elected Governor
Abeng Remulla
NUP
- Vice gubernatorial election
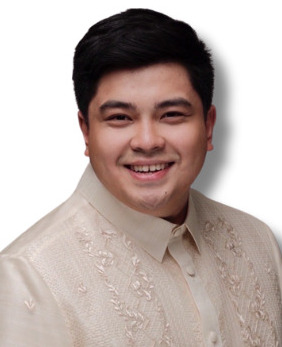
Candidate	Ram Bautista
Party	Lakas
Popular vote	1,178,445
Percentage	100.00
Vice Governor before election
Shernan Jaro
NUP
Elected Vice Governor
Ram Revilla
Lakas

Local elections were held in the province of Cavite on Monday, May 12, 2025, as part of the 2025 Philippine general election. Voters selected candidates for all local positions: a mayor, vice mayor, and councilors, as well as members of the Sangguniang Panlalawigan, the governor, vice governor, and representatives for the eight districts of Cavite.

== Background ==
Incumbent Governor Jonvic Remulla and Vice Governor Athena Tolentino initially intended to seek reelection in 2025, having filed their certificates of candidacy on October 1, 2024. However, they withdrew their candidacies on October 7, 2024, as Remulla would be appointed by President Bongbong Marcos as Secretary of the Department of the Interior and Local Government on the next day. Tolentino made history as the youngest provincial governor at 26 years old, and the first woman to assume office. As a result, she will only serve as governor for nine months and 22 days, as she has decided not to run for any other position. Provincial board member Shernan Jaro, representing Cavite's 3rd congressional district, took over the vice governorship. He is seeking a seat in the city council of Imus.

Incumbent seventh district board member Francisco Gabriel Remulla, son of former governor and incumbent secretary of the Department of Justice Jesus Crispin Remulla filed his certificate of candidacy for governor. Remulla assumed as board member to fill the position vacated by his brother Crispin Diego Remulla upon his election as representative in the special elections held in 2023. Remulla's running mate is incumbent second district board member Ramon Vicente Bautista, son of former governor and incumbent senator Bong Revilla and incumbent representative Lani Mercado.

All single-winner positions in contention use first-past-the-post voting, while all multi-winner positions use plurality block voting. The positions in contention, as well as the quantity of each position, are as follows:

District	Municipality or City	Representatives	Governor	Vice Governor	Members of the Sangguniang Panlalawigan	Mayor	Vice Mayor	Members of the Sangguniang Panlungsod or Sangguniang Bayan
1st	Cavite City	1	1	1	2	1	1	10
1st	Kawit	1	1	1	2	1	1	8
1st	Noveleta	1	1	1	2	1	1	8
1st	Rosario	1	1	1	2	1	1	8
2nd	Bacoor	1	1	1	2	1	1	12 (2 districts, 6 per district)
3rd	Imus	1	1	1	2	1	1	12
4th	Dasmariñas	1	1	1	2	1	1	12
5th	Carmona	1	1	1	2	1	1	10
5th	Silang	1	1	1	2	1	1	8
5th	General Mariano Alvarez	1	1	1	2	1	1	8
6th	General Trias	1	1	1	2	1	1	12
7th	Trece Martires	1	1	1	2	1	1	10
7th	Amadeo	1	1	1	2	1	1	8
7th	Indang	1	1	1	2	1	1	8
7th	Tanza	1	1	1	2	1	1	8
8th	Tagaytay	1	1	1	2	1	1	10
8th	Alfonso	1	1	1	2	1	1	8
8th	General Emilio Aguinaldo	1	1	1	2	1	1	8
8th	Magallanes	1	1	1	2	1	1	8
8th	Maragondon	1	1	1	2	1	1	8
8th	Mendez	1	1	1	2	1	1	8
8th	Naic	1	1	1	2	1	1	8
8th	Ternate	1	1	1	2	1	1	8

== Provincial elections ==
=== Governor ===
Incumbent Athena Tolentino, who assumed post after the appointment of Jonvic Remulla as DILG Secretary, initially ran for vice governor but later withdrew her candidacy with Remulla and decided not to run for any other position. Her party nominated incumbent board member Francisco Gabriel Remulla.

Cavite gubernatorial election
Party	Candidate	Votes	%
NUP	Abeng Remulla	1,058,412	73.56
Independent	Weng Aguinaldo	270,207	18.78
Independent	Augusto Pera, Jr.	60,713	4.22
Independent	GB Ber Ado	49,419	3.43
Total votes		1,438,751	100
NUP hold			

=== Vice Governor ===
Incumbent Shernan Jaro, who assumed office after Athena Tolentino was elevated to governor, is running for councilor of Imus. He was the incumbent third district board member before becoming vice governor. Running for the position unopposed is incumbent board member Ramon Vicente Bautista.

Cavite vice gubernatorial election
Party	Candidate	Votes	%
Lakas	Ram Revilla Bautista	1,178,445	100
Total votes		1,178,445	100
Lakas hold			

=== Provincial Board elections ===
==== First district ====
2025 Provincial Board Election in 1st District of Cavite
Party	Candidate	Votes	%
Lakas	Romel Enriquez	109,098	52.69
Lakas	Jygs Gandia	97,945	47.31
Total votes		207,043	100

==== Second district ====
2025 Provincial Board Election in 2nd District of Cavite
Party	Candidate	Votes	%
Lakas	Edwin Malvar	122,888	54.89
Lakas	Alde Pagulayan	100,995	45.11
Total votes		223,883	100

==== Third district ====
2025 Provincial Board Election in 3rd District of Cavite
Party	Candidate	Votes	%
NUP	Ony Cantimbuhan	112,747	50.06
NUP	Lloyd Jaro	112,485	49.94
Total votes		225,232	100

==== Fourth district ====
2025 Provincial Board Election in 4th District of Cavite
Party	Candidate	Votes	%
NUP	Nickol Austria	191,691	43.18
NUP	Jun dela Cuesta	151,960	34.23
Reporma	Ely Guimbaolibot	54,560	12.29
Independent	Niña Trinidad	45,707	10.30
Total votes		443,918	100

==== Fifth district ====
2025 Provincial Board Election in 5th District of Cavite
Party	Candidate	Votes	%
NUP	Aidel Belamide	139,970	50.10
NUP	Ivee Reyes	139,414	49.90
Total votes		279,384	100

==== Sixth district ====
2025 Provincial Board Election in 6th District of Cavite
Party	Candidate	Votes	%
NUP	Kerby Salazar	97,802	50.86
NUP	Morit Sison	94,943	49.14
Total votes		192,295	100

==== Seventh district ====
2025 Provincial Board Election in 7th District of Cavite
Party	Candidate	Votes	%
NUP	Aldrin Anacan	135,998	38.42
Aksyon	Camille del Rosario	119,202	33.68
UNIDO	Ver Ambion	81,474	23.02
Independent	Alfredo Sunga	17,271	4.88
Total votes		353,945	100

==== Eighth district ====
2025 Provincial Board Election in 8th District of Cavite
Party	Candidate	Votes	%
NPC	Jasmin Maligaya	132,723	42.12
NUP	Eimeren Nazareno	97,793	31.03
NUP	Rainier Ambion	84,619	26.85
Total votes		315,135	100

== Congressional elections ==
=== First district (Northern Cavite) ===
Incumbent Jolo Revilla is running for a second term. His opponent is Paul Abaya, his opponent in 2022.

2025 Philippine House of Representatives election in Cavite's 1st congressional district
Party	Candidate	Votes	%
Lakas	Jolo Revilla	147,263	77.93
Liberal	Doc Paul Abaya	41,710	22.07
Total votes		188,973	100
Lakas hold			

=== Second district (Bacoor) ===
Incumbent Lani Mercado-Revilla is running for a second term unopposed.

2025 Philippine House of Representatives election in Cavite's 2nd congressional district
Party	Candidate	Votes	%
Lakas	Lani Mercado-Revilla	172,694	100
Total votes		172,694	100
Lakas hold			

=== Third district (Imus) ===
Incumbent Adrian Jay Advincula is running for a second term. His opponents are former Imus mayor Emmanuel Maliksi and Atty. Marvyn Maristela.

2025 Philippine House of Representatives election in Cavite's 3rd congressional district
Party	Candidate	Votes	%
NUP	AJ Advincula	98,072	53.10
Aksyon	Emmanuel Maliksi	78,916	42.73
WPP	Atty. Marvyn Maristela	7,700	4.17
Total votes		184,688	100
NUP hold			

=== Fourth district (Dasmariñas) ===
The seat was vacant after the death of Elpidio Barzaga Jr. His party's nominee is his son, Dasmariñas councilor and ex-officio Cavite board member Francisco Barzaga. One of his opponents will be former five-term councilor Jacinto Frani Jr., who happens to be a cousin of the elder Barzaga.

2025 Philippine House of Representatives election in Cavite's 4th congressional district
Party	Candidate	Votes	%
NUP	Kiko Barzaga	165,942	50.37
Independent	Jesse Frani	150,316	45.63
Independent	Osmundo Calupad	9,583	2.91
PLM	Leysander Ordenes	3,591	1.09
Total votes		329,432	100
NUP hold			

=== Fifth district (CarSiGMA District) ===
Incumbent Roy Loyola is running for a second term.

2025 Philippine House of Representatives election in Cavite's 5th congressional district
Party	Candidate	Votes	%
NPC	Roy Loyola	149,622	61.00
Independent	Julie Tolentino	95,646	39.00
Total votes		245,268	100
NPC hold			

=== Sixth district (General Trias) ===
Incumbent Antonio Ferrer is running for a second term unopposed.

2025 Philippine House of Representatives election in Cavite's 6th congressional district
Party	Candidate	Votes	%
NUP	Antonio Ferrer	121,284	100
Total votes		121,284	100
NUP hold			

=== Seventh district (Central Cavite) ===
Incumbent Crispin Diego Remulla is running for his first full term.

2025 Philippine House of Representatives election in Cavite's 7th congressional district
Party	Candidate	Votes	%
NUP	Ping Remulla	190,499	80.88
Independent	Michael Angelo Santos	27,505	11.68
WPP	Wally Abutin	17,531	7.44
Total votes		235,535	100
NUP hold			

=== Eighth district (Southwest Cavite) ===
Incumbent Aniela Bianca Tolentino is running for a second term. Her opponent is 8th District Provincial Board Member Irene Bencito.

2025 Philippine House of Representatives election in Cavite's 8th congressional district
Party	Candidate	Votes	%
NUP	Cong Aniela Tolentino	167,163	76.60
Aksyon	Irene Bencito	45,398	20.80
Independent	Allan Par	5,676	2.60
Total votes		218,237	100
NUP hold			

== City and municipal elections ==
=== First district ===
==== Cavite City ====
Cavite City Mayoral election
Party	Candidate	Votes	%
Lakas	Denver Chua	50,325	100
Total votes		50,325	100
Lakas hold			

Cavite City Vice Mayoral election
Party	Candidate	Votes	%
Lakas	Raleigh Rusit	42,506	78.26
Liberal	Penchie Consigo	11,809	21.74
Total votes		54,315	100
Lakas hold			

==== Kawit ====
Kawit Mayoralty Election
Party	Candidate	Votes	%
Lakas	Armi Aguinaldo	26,878	52.56
Liberal	Boy Blue Abaya	24,258	47.44
Total votes		51,136	100
Lakas hold			

Kawit Vice Mayoralty Election
Party	Candidate	Votes	%
Lakas	Angelo Aguinaldo	29,541	58.53
Liberal	Gerry Ramos	20,934	41.47
Total votes		50,475	100
Lakas hold			

==== Noveleta ====
Noveleta Mayoral election
Party	Candidate	Votes	%
Lakas	Davey Chua	17,012	69.10
Aksyon	Arlyn Torres	7,606	30.90
Total votes		24,618	100
Lakas hold			

Noveleta Vice Mayoral election
Party	Candidate	Votes	%
Lakas	Dino Chua	17,017	69.83
Aksyon	Ronel Lamit	7,351	30.17
Total votes		24,368	100
Lakas gain from Aksyon			

==== Rosario ====
Rosario Mayoral election
Party	Candidate	Votes	%
Lakas	Voltaire Ricafrente	57,390	100
Total votes		57,390	100
Lakas hold			

Rosario Vice Mayoral election
Party	Candidate	Votes	%
Lakas	Bamm Gonzales	54,234	100
Total votes		54,234	100
Lakas hold			

=== Second district ===
==== Bacoor ====
Bacoor Mayoral election
Party	Candidate	Votes	%
Nacionalista	Strike Revilla	172,187	100
Total votes		172,187	100
Nacionalista hold			

Bacoor Vice Mayoral election
Party	Candidate	Votes	%
NPC	Rowena Bautista-Mendiola	158,270	100
Total votes		158,270	100
NPC hold			

Bacoor City Councilor election (1st District)
Party	Candidate	Votes	%
Nacionalista	Karen Sarino-Evaristo	71,509	18.54
NPC	Mike Bautista	68,908	17.87
Lakas	Adriel Gawaran	64,756	16.79
Lakas	Noly Galvez	61,938	16.06
NPC	Ricardo Ugalde	60,643	15.72
NPC	Nevy Tela	57,914	15.02
Total votes		385,668	100

Bacoor City Councilor election (2nd District)
Party	Candidate	Votes	%
Nacionalista	Roberto Advincula	60,925	16.85
Lakas	Rey Palabrica	58,277	16.12
Nacionalista	Bok Nolasco	53,529	14.81
NPC	Rey Fabian	52,778	14.60
Nacionalista	Simplicio Dominguez	49,470	13.69
Lakas	Horacio Brilliantes Jr.	43,481	12.03
Independent	Eduardo Rosario Jr.	21,572	5.97
Independent	Nicole Lyu	21,449	5.93
Total votes		361,481	100

=== Third district ===
==== Imus ====
Imus Mayoral election
Party	Candidate	Votes	%
NUP	Alex Advincula	119,636	65.58
Aksyon	RR Lacson	58,344	31.98
WPP	Mike Platon Lim	4,455	2.44
Total votes		182,435	100
NUP hold			

Imus Vice Mayoral election
Party	Candidate	Votes	%
NUP	Homer Saquilayan	140,016	86.47
Independent	Dexter Marcos	12,516	7.73
WPP	Nick Navia	9,396	5.80
Total votes		161,928	100
NUP hold			

=== Fourth district ===
==== Dasmariñas ====
Dasmariñas Mayoral election
Party	Candidate	Votes	%
NUP	Jennifer Barzaga	260,308	78.12
Reporma	Vale Encabo	65,797	19.75
Independent	Jonathan Fernando	6,228	1.87
PM	Hadassah Tapiru	871	0.26
Total votes		333,204	100
NUP hold			

Dasmariñas Vice Mayoral election
Party	Candidate	Votes	%
NUP	Third Barzaga	245,088	77.86
Reporma	Oly Rementilla	49,784	15.82
Independent	Joel Musa	19,911	6.33
Total votes		314,783	100
NUP hold			

Dasmariñas City Councilor election
Party	Candidate	Votes	%
NUP	Rudy Lara	196,258	6.89
NUP	Rey Canaynay	193,234	6.79
NUP	Robin Cantimbuhan	178,096	6.26
NUP	Daisy Lyn Alvarez	162,307	5.70
NUP	Doc Kevin Tapawan	147,594	5.18
NUP	Jeg Gonzales	142,714	4.99
NUP	Roderick Atienza	142,089	4.99
NUP	Glenn Malihan	138,410	4.85
NUP	Jorge Magno	135,357	4.75
NUP	Azlie Guro	135,109	4.75
NUP	Fernando Laudato	130,896	4.60
Independent	Resty Encabo	127,097	4.46
NUP	Moises Menguito	105,201	3.70
Independent	Neilson Coleta	86,146	3.03
Independent	Arnel del Rosario	84,321	2.96
Independent	Vladimir Maliksi	79,011	2.78
Akbayan	Nemerlito Perez	48,417	1.70
Reporma	Yen Mendoza	47,760	1.68
Reporma	Doc Rey Balibago	46,588	1.64
Reporma	Jannus Toledo	45,063	1.58
Reporma	Romy Joson	41,403	1.45
Reporma	Dom Tagle	40,845	1.43
Independent	Allan Rey Trinidad	37,313	1.31
Reporma	Jeanneath Velarde	36,062	1.27
Independent	Norma Salcedo	32,946	1.16
Reporma	Edgardo Escaño	31,241	1.10
Reporma	Che Geda	30,724	1.08
Reporma	Mar Apostol	28,895	1.02
Reporma	Marlon Sinigayan	28,309	0.99
Independent	Ronald Famindalan	27,914	0.98
Reporma	Kuya Je Denolo	27,525	0.97
Independent	Lorna Rescarte	26,656	0.94
Independent	Virginia Pasaporte	22,563	0.79
Reporma	Ivan Tumacay	22,384	0.79
Independent	Boyet Siriban	22,175	0.78
Independent	Tony Tianela	18,974	0.67
Total votes		2,846,787	100

=== Fifth district ===
==== Carmona ====
Carmona Mayoral election
Party	Candidate	Votes	%
NPC	Dahlia Loyola	48,744	92.33
Independent	Dennis Restrivera	4,052	7.67
Total votes		52,796	100
NPC hold			

Carmona Vice Mayoral election
Party	Candidate	Votes	%
NPC	Cesar Ines Jr.	43,361	87.80
Independent	Rommel Gonzales	6,024	12.20
Total votes		49,385	100
NPC hold			

==== Silang ====
Incumbent Mayor Edward Carranza is running for his first full term against former Mayors Kevin Anarna and Emilia Poblete.

On May 5, 2025, a Commission on Elections (COMELEC) task force filed a disqualification case against Anarna for remarks made during a campaign event that were deemed discriminatory toward single parents. The poll body cited a possible violation of Resolution No. 11116, which upholds anti-discrimination and fair campaigning rules in line with the Safe Spaces Act. Anarna, who has since apologized, was earlier issued a show-cause order over the statements.

Kevin Anarna was initially proclaimed as the winner. However, the COMELEC en banc nullified his proclamation, after the Office of the Ombudsman found Anarna guilty of grave misconduct and is perpetually disqualified from holding public office. As a result, second placer Ted Caranza was declared the duly-elected mayor and Anarna's votes were considered stray votes. Carranza then took his oath as mayor on June 26.

Silang Mayoral election
Party	Candidate	Votes	%
NUP	Atty. Kevin Anarna	54,787	41.80
NPC	Gen Ted Carranza	40,447	30.86
PMP	Omil Poblete	34,154	26.06
Independent	Mariano Ambulo Jr.	1,691	1.29
Total votes		131,079	100
NPC hold			

Incumbent Vice Mayor Mark Anthony Toledo is running for his first full term against Former Provincial Board Member Marcos Amutan, ABC President Crispin Reyes & Dra. Armin Guarin.

Silang Vice Mayoral election
Party	Candidate	Votes	%
Liberal	Cris Kidlat Reyes	40,709	32.35
NPC	Mat Toledo	37,496	29.79
NUP	Macoy Amutan	35,725	28.39
Aksyon	Armin Guarin	11,923	9.47
Total votes		125,853	100
Liberal gain from NPC			

Silang Municipal Councilor election
Party	Candidate	Votes	%
NUP	Isang-Bagsak Doneza	64,999	8.02
NUP	Ivan Amutan	56,405	6.96
NUP	Allan Tolentino	48,990	6.05
NPC	Ara Loyola	48,524	5.99
NUP	Cokiat Garcia	43,004	5.31
NUP	Ari Velazco	39,953	4.93
NUP	Ohmie Toledo	37,922	4.68
NUP	Carlo Madlansacay	37,681	4.65
NUP	Junjang Batingal	36,914	4.56
UNIDO	Peping Desingaño	36,461	4.50
Liberal	Noli Poblete	35,912	4.43
NPC	Freddie Magnaye	34,336	4.24
Independent	Leo Mortel	33,168	4.09
Independent	Nestor Joe Patawe	30,528	3.77
Independent	Prof Joey Perando	29,229	3.61
PMP	Kap Alvin Kiamzon	27,966	3.45
NPC	Atty. Zaldy Ambon	26,202	3.23
Lakas	Gabby Oliveros	26,148	3.23
PMP	Kap Hopia Legaspi	17,693	2.18
Aksyon	Chit Gana-Poblete	17,628	2.18
Aksyon	Francis Bautista	17,587	2.17
Liberal	Erwin Montojo	14,287	1.76
PMP	Deo Zonio	11,523	1.42
Independent	Feliciano Poblete	11,428	1.41
PMP	Mama Che Pacificar	10,628	1.31
Independent	Gerry Belardo	8,040	0.99
Independent	Jerome Ninong Calvadores	7,195	0.89
Total votes		810,531	100

==== General Mariano Alvarez ====
Incumbent Mayor Maricel Torres is running for re-election to her 2nd full term against Medardo Custodio.

General Mariano Alvarez Mayoral election
Party	Candidate	Votes	%
KBL	Ed Custodio	35,595	51.37
NUP	Maricel Torres	33,695	48.63
Total votes		69,290	100
KBL gain from NUP			

Incumbent Vice Mayor Percival Cabuhat is running for re-election against Incumbent Councilor Mike Virata and Provincial Board Member Paolo Crisostomo.

General Mariano Alvarez Vice Mayoral election
Party	Candidate	Votes	%
Aksyon	Percy Cabuhat	32,035	46.72
NUP	Mike Virata	18,560	27.07
Lakas	BM Paolo Crisostomo	17,972	26.21
Total votes		68,567	100
Aksyon hold			

=== Sixth district ===
==== General Trias ====
Incumbent Mayor Luis Ferrer IV is running for re-election to his second term unopposed.

General Trias Mayoral election
Party	Candidate	Votes	%
NUP	Luis Ferrer IV	128,077	100
Total votes		128,077	100
NUP hold			

Incumbent Vice Mayor Jonas Labuguen is running to his second term unopposed.

General Trias Vice Mayoral election
Party	Candidate	Votes	%
NUP	Jonas Labuguen	120,278	100
Total votes		120,278	100
NUP hold			

=== Seventh district ===
==== Trece Martires City ====
Incumbent Mayor Gemma Lubigan is running for re-election to her 3rd and last term, her opponent are former Mayor Melencio De Sagun Jr.

Trece Martires City Mayoral election
Party	Candidate	Votes	%
NUP	Gemma Lubigan	57,450	64.98
PDP–Laban	Jun de Sagun	30,963	35.02
Total votes		88,413	100
NUP hold			

Incumbent Vice Mayor Romeo Motehermoso is running for re-election to his 3rd and last term, his opponent are Alex Penalba.

Trece Martires City Vice Mayoral election
Party	Candidate	Votes	%
NUP	Bobby Montehermoso	55,878	68.80
PDP–Laban	Alex Peñalba	25,343	31.20
Total votes		81,221	100
NUP hold			

==== Amadeo ====
Incumbent Mayor Redel John Dionisio is running for re-election, his opponent are Jojo Domingo.

Amadeo Mayoral election
Party	Candidate	Votes	%
Independent	Jojo Domingo	10,472	64.25
NUP	Redel John Dionisio	5,826	35.75
Total votes		16,298	100
Independent gain from NUP			

Incumbent Vice Mayor Joseph Legaspi is running for re-election unopposed.

Amadeo Vice Mayoral election
Party	Candidate	Votes	%
NUP	Joseph Legaspi	15,059	100
Total votes		15,059	100
NUP hold			

==== Indang ====
Incumbent Mayor Perfecto Fidel is term-limited, his party nominated his cousin, Brgy. Calumpang Cerca Chairman Virgilio Fidel, his opponents are Incumbent Vice Mayor Sammy Rodil and Resty Vejerano

Indang Mayoral election
Party	Candidate	Votes	%
NUP	Virgilio Fidel	21,861	56.84
WPP	Resty Vejerano	13,741	35.73
Independent	Sammy Rodil	2,856	7.43
Total votes		38,458	100
NUP hold			

Incumbent Vice Mayor Sammy Rodil is term-limited and is running for Mayor, running for the position are Incumbent Councilor Ferdinand Papa, independent candidate Alvin Pio De Roda and Racquel Quiambao.

Indang Vice Mayoral election
Party	Candidate	Votes	%
NUP	Ferdi Papa	23,685	64.46
WPP	Raquel Quiambao	10,589	28.82
Independent	Alvin Pio de Roda	2,471	6.72
Total votes		36,475	100
NUP gain from Independent			

==== Tanza ====
Incumbent Mayor Yuri Pacumio is term-limited, running for the position are Incumbent Vice Mayor Archangelo Matro, Incumbent Councilor Maricel Del Rosario-Morales and independent candidate Elsie Aribal.

Tanza Mayoral election
Party	Candidate	Votes	%
NUP	SM Matro	67,949	51.02
Aksyon	Icel del Rosario	63,922	47.99
Independent	Mami Aribal	1,314	0.99
Total votes		133,185	100
NUP hold			

Incumbent Vice Mayor Archangelo Matro is eligible for re-election but he instead will run for Mayor, his party nominated former Municipal Administrator John Rodgie Sanariz, his opponents are Incumbent Provincial Board Member Raymundo Del Rosario and independent candidate Prescilla Givera.

Tanza Vice Mayoral election
Party	Candidate	Votes	%
Aksyon	Munding del Rosario	65,289	52.31
NUP	Tutuy Sanariz	55,239	44.26
Independent	Prescilla Givera	4,276	3.43
Total votes		124,804	100
Aksyon gain from NUP			

=== Eighth district ===
==== Tagaytay City ====
Incumbent Mayor Abraham Tolentino is not seeking re-election. His son, City Councilor Aizack Brent Tolentino, will run in his place.

Tagaytay City Mayoral election
Party	Candidate	Votes	%
NUP	Brent Tolentino	36,590	100
Total votes		36,590	100
NUP hold			

Incumbent Vice Mayor Agnes Tolentino is running for re-election unopposed.

Tagaytay City Vice Mayoral election
Party	Candidate	Votes	%
NUP	Agnes Tolentino	36,662	100
Total votes		36,662	100
NUP hold			

==== Alfonso ====
Incumbent Mayor Randy Salamat is running for re-election unopposed.

Alfonso Mayoral election
Party	Candidate	Votes	%
NUP	Randy Salamat	25,873	100
Total votes		25,873	100
NUP hold			

Incumbent Vice Mayor Madonna Pel is running for re-election unopposed.

Alfonso Vice Mayoral election
Party	Candidate	Votes	%
NUP	Madona Pel	23,945	100
Total votes		23,945	100
NUP hold			

Alfonso Municipal Councilor election
Party	Candidate	Votes	%
NUP	Jeff Salamat	19,742	12.33
NUP	Rex Ferolino	17,519	10.94
NUP	Silverio Perea	16,931	10.58
Independent	Mslen Reyes	14,875	9.29
NUP	Erwin Signo	14,236	8.89
NUP	Joselito Resurreccion	13,895	8.68
NUP	Ebeth Varias	13,565	8.47
NUP	Cynthia Peji	12,508	7.81
NUP	Renato Vidallon	11,372	7.10
Independent	Abe Cordente	9,478	5.92
Independent	Harris Peñano	9,396	5.87
Independent	Bong Pel	6,562	4.10
Total votes		160,079	100

==== General Emilio Aguinaldo ====
Incumbent Mayor Dennis Glean is running for re-election

General Emilio Aguinaldo Mayoral election
Party	Candidate	Votes	%
NUP	Dennis Glean	8,235	54.81
NPC	Danilo Bencito	6,790	45.19
Total votes		15,025	100
NUP hold			

Incumbent Louel Golfo is running for re-election, his opponent are Michael Manalo.

General Emilio Aguinaldo Vice Mayoral election
Party	Candidate	Votes	%
NUP	Louel Golfo	7,730	52.57
NPC	Michael Manalo	6,973	47.43
Total votes		14,703	100
NUP hold			

==== Magallanes ====
Incumbent Mayor Jasmin Maligaya is term-limited and is running for Provincial Board Member, her party nominated her sister, Janessa Ann Maligaya and her opponent are Ernesto Dastas.

Magallanes Mayoral election
Party	Candidate	Votes	%
NPC	Janessa Ann Maligaya	10,934	74.62
NUP	Ernesto Dastas	3,718	25.38
Total votes		14,652	100
NPC hold			

Incumbent Vice Mayor Jess Antazo is running for re-election against Aina Sisante.

Magallanes Vice Mayoral election
Party	Candidate	Votes	%
NPC	Aina Sisante	7,653	51.73
NUP	Jess Antazo	7,142	48.27
Total votes		14,795	100
NPC gain from NUP			

==== Maragondon ====
Incumbent Mayor Lawrence Arca is running for re-election against former Mayor Reynaldo Rillo.

Maragondon Mayoral election
Party	Candidate	Votes	%
NPC	Umbe Arca	17,238	63.16
NUP	Rey Rillo	10,056	36.84
Total votes		27,294	100
NPC hold			

Incumbent Vice Mayor Bernie Ilagan is running for re-election against Aldous Angeles and independent candidate Reagan Gulapa.

Maragondon Vice Mayoral election
Party	Candidate	Votes	%
NUP	Aldous Angeles	13,056	48.67
NPC	Bernie Ilagan	11,003	41.01
Independent	Reagan Gulapa	2,769	10.32
Total votes		26,828	100
NUP gain from NPC			

==== Mendez ====
Incumbent Mayor Francisco Mendoza Jr. is running for re-election unopposed.

Mendez Mayoral election
Party	Candidate	Votes	%
NUP	Francisco Mendoza Jr.	14,238	100
Total votes		14,238	100
NUP hold			

Incumbent Raygan Dimapilis is running for re-election against Roilan Ortiz.

Mendez Vice Mayoral election
Party	Candidate	Votes	%
NPC	Raygan Dimapilis	10,757	53.63
NUP	Roilan Ortiz	9,302	46.37
Total votes		20,059	100
NPC hold			

==== Naic ====
Incumbent Mayor Ruperto Dualan is not seeking re-election, his brother, Incumbent Vice Mayor Junio Dualan will run in his place, his opponents are Incumbent Councilor Rommel Magbitang and independent candidates Benjie Medina and Isabela Nopuente.

Naic Mayoral election
Party	Candidate	Votes	%
UNIDO	Rommel Magbitang	45,828	54.47
NPC	Junio Dualan	37,802	44.93
Independent	Benjie Medina	316	0.38
Independent	Isabela Nopuente	196	0.23
Total votes		84,142	100
UNIDO gain from NPC			

Incumbent Vice Mayor Junio Dualan is running for Mayor, his party nominated Jacinta Maria Remulla, daughter of Justice Secretary Jesus Crispin Remulla, her opponent are independent candidate Antonio Autentico Jr. while Incumbent Councilor Maria Teresa Puno withdrew her candidacy.

Naic Vice Mayoral election
Party	Candidate	Votes	%
NPC	Jacinta Maria Remulla	61,108	87.74
Independent	Antonio Autentico Jr.	8,539	12.26
Total votes		69,647	100
NPC hold			

==== Ternate ====
Incumbent Mayor Lamberto Bambao is running for re-election against Incumbent Vice Mayor Salvador Gubio Jr. and independent candidate Clemencia Garcia. Former mayor Herminio Lindo withdrew his candidacy.

Ternate Mayoral election
Party	Candidate	Votes	%
NPC	Lamberto Bambao	7,767	54.85
NUP	Salvador Gubio Jr.	6,067	42.84
Independent	Inday Garcia	327	2.31
Total votes		14,161	100
NPC hold			

Incumbent Vice Mayor Salvador Gubio Jr. is running for Mayor, running for the position are Lolita Nacis and Calvin Kenneth Soberano.

Ternate Vice Mayoral election
Party	Candidate	Votes	%
PMP	Kim Soberano	10,283	75.02
NPC	Lolita Nacis	3,424	24.98
Total votes		13,707	100
PMP gain from NUP			
