= Indang =

Municipality in Cavite, Philippines

Indang Indan
- Municipality
- Municipality of Indang
- Indang Town Proper Old Indang Municipal Hall Saint Gregory the Great Parish Church

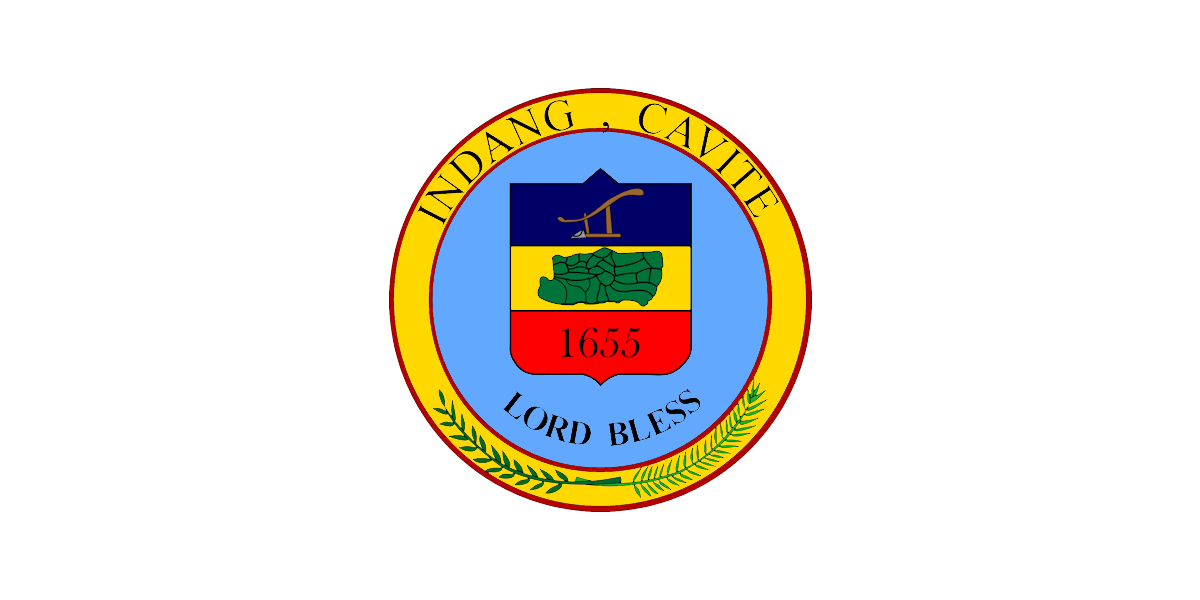
- Flag Seal
- Nicknames: Upland Market Center; Agri-Tourism Municipality
- Motto: Indang Atin 'to!
- Map of Cavite with Indang highlighted
- Interactive map of Indang
- Location within the Philippines
- Coordinates: 14°12′N 120°53′E
- Country: Philippines
- Region: Calabarzon
- Province: Cavite
- District: 7th district
- Founded: 1655
- Barangays: 36 (see Barangays)

Government
  - Type: Sangguniang Bayan
  - Mayor: Virgilio F. Fidel
  - Vice Mayor: Ferdinand T. Papa
  - Representative: Crispin Diego D. Remulla
  - Municipal Council: Members: Exequiel D. Penus; John Mark M. Cayao; Joel R. Carungcong; Constancio S. Telmo Jr.; Danilo V. Masangcay; Ronald D. Bernarte; Chrissel R. Borja; Jose Joezel T. Pareño
  - Electorate: 46,671 voters (2025)

Area
  - Total: 74.90 km^{2} (28.92 sq mi)
- Elevation: 325 m (1,066 ft)
- Highest elevation: 700 m (2,300 ft)
- Lowest elevation: 49 m (161 ft)

Population (2024 census)
  - Total: 70,092
  - Density: 935.8/km^{2} (2,424/sq mi)
  - Households: 17,012
- Demonym(s): Indangeño, Taga-Indang

Economy
  - Income class: 1st municipal income class
  - Poverty incidence: 9.81% (2023)
  - Revenue: ₱ 320.5 million (2024)
  - Assets: ₱ 673.4 million (2024)
  - Expenditure: ₱ 168.5 million (2024)
  - Liabilities: ₱ 199 million (2024)

Service provider
  - Electricity: Manila Electric Company (Meralco)
- Time zone: UTC+8 (PST)
- ZIP code: 4122
- PSGC: 0402110000
- IDD : area code: +63 (0)46
- Native languages: Tagalog
- Major religions: Roman Catholicism; Protestantism; Islam
- Feast date: September 3
- Catholic diocese: Diocese of Imus
- Patron saint: Saint Gregory the Great
- Website: www.indang.gov.ph

Indang, officially the Municipality of Indang (Tagalog: Bayan ng Indang), is a municipality in the province of Cavite, Philippines. According to the 2024 census, it has a population of 70,092 people.

== Etymology ==
Indang (originally called Indan) was established as a town in 1655, when it was administratively separated from the nearby town of Silang, Cavite. Indang derived its name from the words "Inrang" or "yndan", a tree which was also called "Anubing". The tree of Inrang used to be abundant in the area.

== History ==
=== Before 1655: Separation and Independence ===
Indang was part of Silang, Cavite for about 70 years, the municipality of Indang was organized with a prominent native, Juan Dimabiling, as the first gobernadorcillo. The distance between the barrio of Indang and the Poblacion of Silang caused the residents of the former great difficulty in transacting officials' business and attending religious services.

The residents of Indang petitioned higher authorities to convert the barrio into a separate municipality. Although the exact date of its establishment cannot be verified, records indicate that Indang was founded during the cold months of 1655. Consequently, the municipal government designated December 1 as “Indang Day,” which has been celebrated annually since. The 1818 Spanish census recorded 2,759 native families and 36 Spanish-Filipino families in the area.

=== 1896-1897: The Philippine Revolution ===
During the Philippine Revolution, Indan was known by its Katipunan name "Walang Tinag". It was also during this time that the letter "g" was added to its name; thus it is now called Indang. It belonged to the Magdiwang faction, which rivaled the Magdalo faction. In Barrio Limbon, Andrés Bonifacio was arrested after he left the Tejeros Convention and prevented from pursuing his counter-revolutionary plan according to witnesses.

One of these witnesses was Severino de las Alas, a resident of the town, who accused Bonifacio of threatening the people and burning the Church of Indang, dedicated to the town patron, Saint Gregory the Great. The church was built in the 17th century and is one of the oldest in the province. De las Alas later served in newly formed Revolutionary Government as Interior Secretary.

=== 1906-1998: Cavite State University ===
The Cavite State University began here in 1906 as an intermediate school and was later transformed into a high school. Named after Severino De las Alas in 1958, it later become a college in 1962 and in 1998 earned university status.

=== 1942-1945: Japanese occupation during World War II ===
During the height of World War II, Indang contributed at least 30 citizens who served in the Army and the Navy. On December 8, 1941, just hours after the bombing of Pearl Harbor, Japanese planes arrived and bombed Indang.

After the Japanese landed in 1942, Indang had been evacuated for 3 months. After Sisenando “Dado” Destreza organized a guerrilla unit in Nasugbu in 1942, he was able to contact a Philippine-American guerrilla unit in Indang whose adviser was an American, Major Charles W. Folsom whose headquarters was in Barrio Buna in the middle of the year. Because of this contact, the unit used the name Fil-American Guerrillas. Later, in 1943, the Imperial Japanese Army attacked and occupied the town of Indang. Several people were suspected by the Japanese to be bandits and were executed at the municipal cemetery. The Japanese tortured and killed whom they suspected as guerrillas. Food was scarce and banditry became rampant. Smuggling was done to survive from the harsh period. All stains of American influence were wiped out and the revised curriculum patterned Japanese influence. During the occupation, espionage activities of 20 Filipino spies collaborating with the Japanese became more active to infiltrate any guerrilla operations in Indang. In the latter part of 1943, lawless elements became rampant in Cavite, which motivated Destreza to separate from the Cavite guerrillas in Indang.

After the Americans returned in 1945, public buildings were destroyed by countless bombings, including the Indang Rural High School (now Cavite State University).

=== 1945: Post-war era ===
After World War II, Indang was able to start its rehabilitation phase with the help of the National Government. The Indang Elementary School for instance was completely rebuilt to its pre-war conditions. Even the public dispensary which was destroyed was completely rebuilt in a bigger form.

=== 2008–2021: Tagaytay water crisis ===
In 2008, Mayor Bienvenido Dimero issued a certification to PTK2 H2O Corporation authorizing it "to utilize, use, or tap" four rivers in Indang. The company then began ground clearing and excavation in Kayquit II. The Save Waters of Indang Movement criticized the Department of Environment and Natural Resources (DENR) for issuing an environmental compliance certificate (ECC) without the required environmental impact statement (EIS), arguing that the ECC was incomplete and issued only after water permits were granted.

The ECC authorized construction of intake structures, booster pumps, sedimentation basins, filter tanks, effluent channels, pumping stations, water pipes, and administration buildings in Kayquit II. The project also involved cutting trees, allegedly without the proper permits. In 2021, the Supreme Court revoked PTK2's ECC and water permits and upheld the granting of a Writ of Kalikasan against the project.

== Geography ==
Indang is a landlocked municipality. It is centrally located in the province of Cavite. It is bounded on the north by the municipality of Naic and the city of Trece Martires, on the south by the municipality of Mendez and the city of Tagaytay, on the west by the municipalities of Alfonso and Maragondon, and on the east by the municipality of Amadeo and the city of General Trias.

The municipality is situated approximately 12 kilometers (7.5 mi) from Tagaytay Ridge.

=== Topography ===
The topography of Indang is characterised by gently sloping or rolling terrain. Almost 40.36% of its total land area is within the slope grade of 3-8%, while 2,135 hectares is within the slope range of 8-15% which is characterised by undulating or sloping terrain.

=== Elevation ===
The land elevation ranges from 230 to 380 metres (750 to 1,250 ft) above sea level. The land area is furthermore fairy well dissected by numerous creeks and streams that are deeply cut, characterised by steep and abrupt banks. Rivers, creeks and spring supply the water needed for both agricultural and households purposes. These rivers and creeks also serves as natural drainage into which storm water is discharged and flow in northern direction to discharged into either Manila Bay or Laguna de Bay.

=== Climate ===
Indang has a tropical climate (Köppen climate classification: Aw) with two pronounced seasons: wet season and dry season. Wet season covers the period from May to December of each year and dry season covers the period from January to April. Due to the rolling landscape of the town, the southern villages near the Mendez and Alfonso borders, due to high elevations and the nearness to Tagaytay, experience cooler temperatures as compared to those in the north, especially from November to February.

Climate data for Indang, Cavite
Month	Jan	Feb	Mar	Apr	May	Jun	Jul	Aug	Sep	Oct	Nov	Dec	Year
Mean daily maximum °C (°F)	27 (81)	28 (82)	30 (86)	32 (90)	31 (88)	29 (84)	27 (81)	27 (81)	27 (81)	28 (82)	28 (82)	27 (81)	28 (83)
Mean daily minimum °C (°F)	19 (66)	19 (66)	19 (66)	21 (70)	22 (72)	23 (73)	22 (72)	22 (72)	22 (72)	21 (70)	20 (68)	19 (66)	21 (69)
Average precipitation mm (inches)	10 (0.4)	10 (0.4)	12 (0.5)	27 (1.1)	94 (3.7)	153 (6.0)	206 (8.1)	190 (7.5)	179 (7.0)	120 (4.7)	54 (2.1)	39 (1.5)	1,094 (43)
Average rainy days	5.2	4.5	6.4	9.2	19.7	24.3	26.9	25.7	24.4	21.0	12.9	9.1	189.3
Source: Meteoblue

=== Barangays ===
Indang is politically subdivided into 36 barangays, as indicated in the matrix below and the image herein. Each barangay consists of puroks and some have sitios.

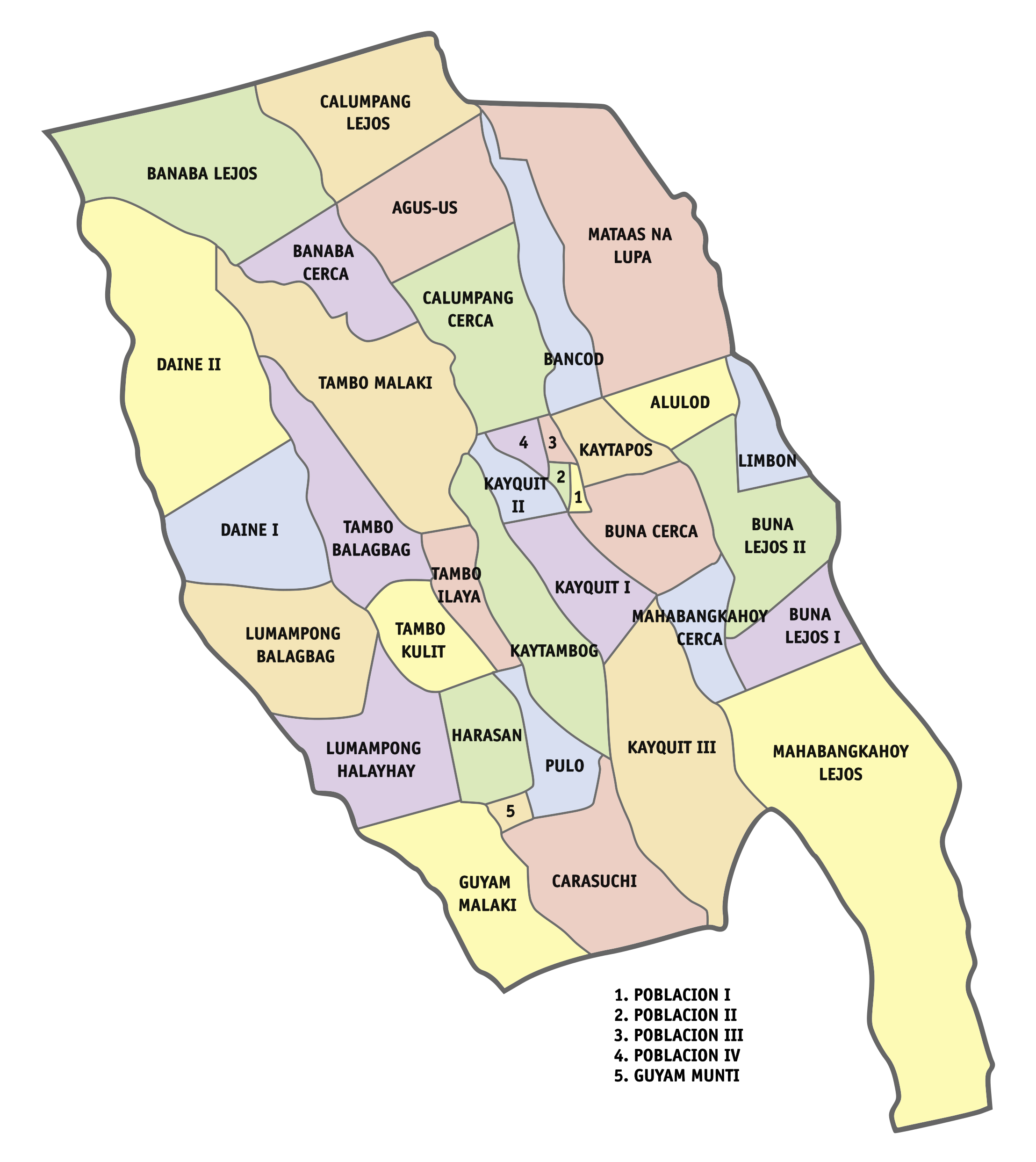
Political map of Indang.

PSGC	Barangay	Population			±% p.a.	
		2024		2010		
042110001	Agus-os	2.1%	1,468	1,386	▴	0.40%
042110002	Alulod	7.2%	5,055	4,322	▴	1.09%
042110003	Banaba Cerca	4.8%	3,356	2,982	▴	0.82%
042110004	Banaba Lejos	2.4%	1,680	1,313	▴	1.72%
042110005	Bancod	3.8%	2,630	2,434	▴	0.54%
042110006	Buna Cerca	5.8%	4,065	3,473	▴	1.10%
042110007	Buna Lejos	2.8%	1,948	1,812	▴	0.50%
042110008	Calumpang Cerca	4.3%	3,035	2,820	▴	0.51%
042110009	Calumpang Lejos	3.9%	2,762	2,543	▴	0.57%
042110010	Carasuchi	2.0%	1,435	1,187	▴	1.32%
042110011	Kayquit I	2.2%	1,559	1,401	▴	0.74%
042110012	Daine I	2.6%	1,809	1,706	▴	0.41%
042110013	Guyam Malaki	3.0%	2,087	2,411	▾	−0.99%
042110014	Guyam Munti	1.1%	749	589	▴	1.68%
042110015	Harasan	1.6%	1,101	922	▴	1.24%
042110016	Kaytambog	2.1%	1,457	1,225	▴	1.21%
042110017	Limbon	0.9%	600	565	▴	0.42%
042110018	Lumampong Balagbag	1.8%	1,274	961	▴	1.97%
042110019	Lumampong Halayhay	2.0%	1,433	1,402	▴	0.15%
042110020	Mahabangkahoy Lejos	1.7%	1,210	869	▴	2.32%
042110021	Mahabangkahoy Cerca	2.7%	1,925	1,700	▴	0.86%
042110022	Poblacion 1	1.9%	1,342	1,320	▴	0.11%
042110023	Poblacion 2	1.3%	914	999	▾	−0.61%
042110024	Poblacion 3	1.5%	1,057	1,030	▴	0.18%
042110025	Poblacion 4	3.4%	2,371	2,394	▾	−0.07%
042110026	Pulo	1.5%	1,053	917	▴	0.96%
042110027	Tambo Balagbag	1.1%	765	722	▴	0.40%
042110028	Tambo Ilaya	1.4%	970	847	▴	0.94%
042110029	Tambo Malaki	2.7%	1,906	1,837	▴	0.26%
042110030	Tambo Kulit	2.2%	1,518	1,466	▴	0.24%
042110031	Buna Lejos II	3.3%	2,314	2,048	▴	0.85%
042110032	Daine II	3.3%	2,326	2,177	▴	0.46%
042110033	Kayquit II	2.7%	1,894	1,810	▴	0.31%
042110034	Kayquit III	3.7%	2,605	2,213	▴	1.14%
042110036	Kaytapos	2.2%	1,558	1,333	▴	1.09%
042110037	Mataas na Lupa	4.9%	3,468	2,894	▴	1.26%
	Total		70,092	62,030	▴	0.85%

== Demographics ==
=== Population ===
Population census of Indang
Year	Pop.	±% p.a.
1903	11,526	—
1918	13,232	+0.92%
1939	15,388	+0.72%
1948	15,989	+0.43%
1960	20,268	+2.00%
1970	24,635	+1.97%
1975	28,709	+3.12%
1980	30,977	+1.53%
1990	39,294	+2.41%
1995	42,765	+1.60%
2000	51,281	+3.97%
2007	60,755	+2.37%
2010	62,030	+0.76%
2015	65,599	+1.07%
2020	68,699	+0.98%
2024	70,092	+0.48%
Source: Philippine Statistics Authority

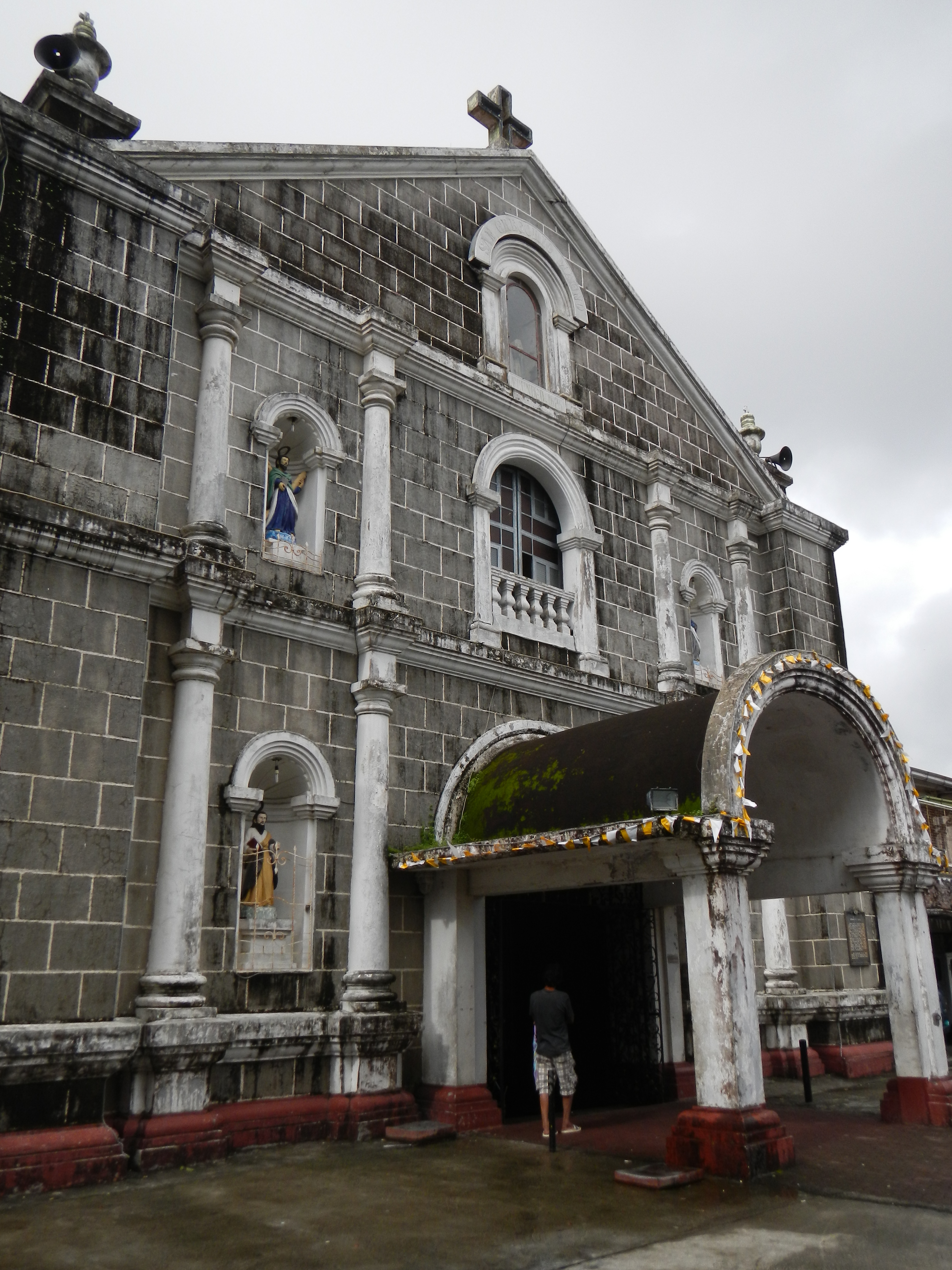
Saint Gregory the Great Parish Façade

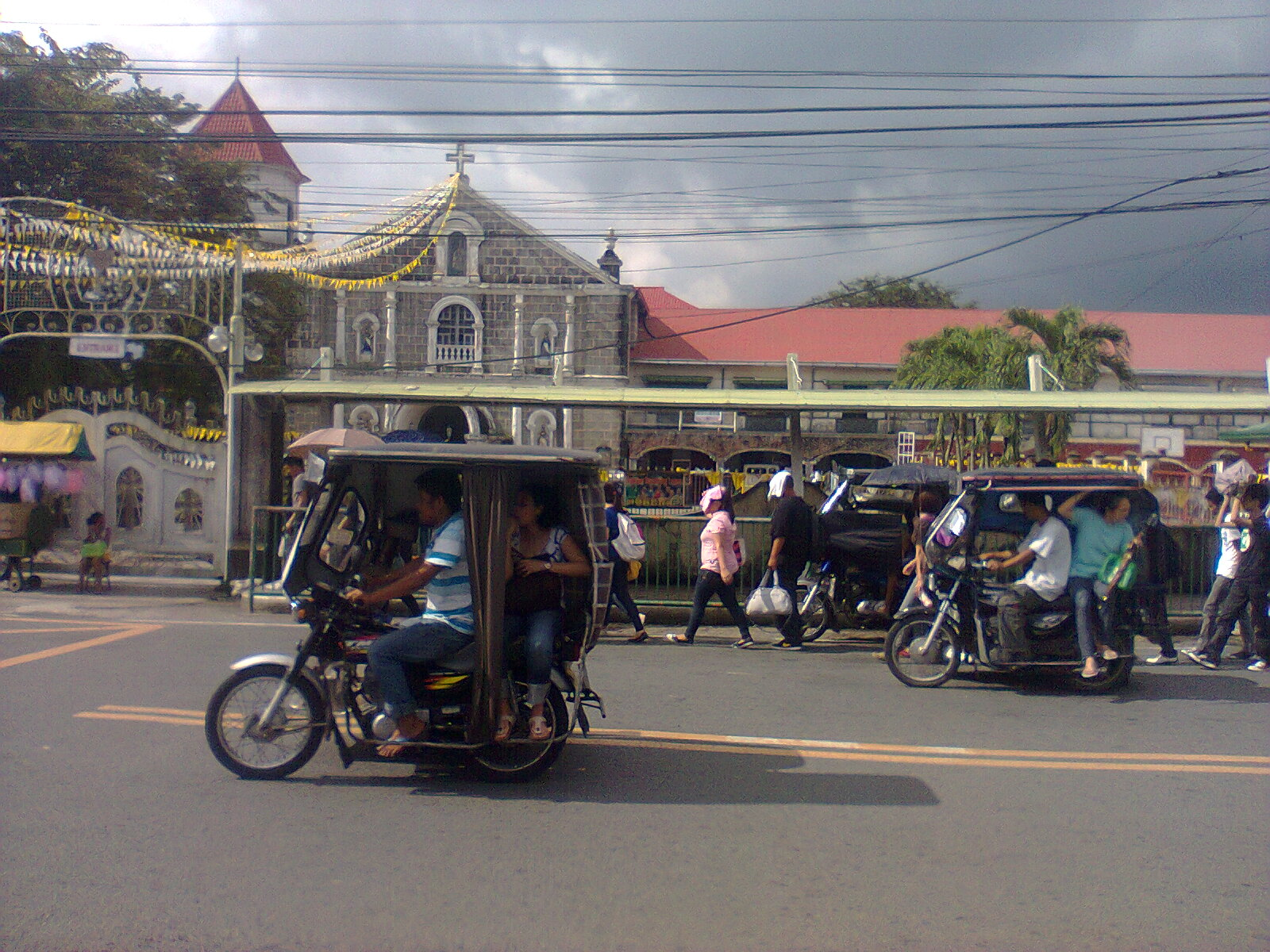
Saint Gregory the Great Parish Church, along A. Mabini Street in Poblacion 1, Indang, Cavite

In the 2024 census, the population of Indang was 70,092 people, with a density of 940 inhabitants per square kilometre or 2,400 inhabitants per square mile. There are five residential subdivisions within the municipality which occupies 44.75 hectares of land.

=== Languages ===
The municipality of Indang has a majority of English and Tagalog speakers. Almost all households in the town are bilingual and know how to speak English.

=== Religion ===
Christianity is the predominant faith, composed of Catholics, Protestants, and other independent Christian groups. A considerable percentage of the population are also composed of Muslims. Religious tolerance exists among members of different sects.

== Economy ==
Poverty incidence of Indang (%)

Source: Philippine Statistics Authority

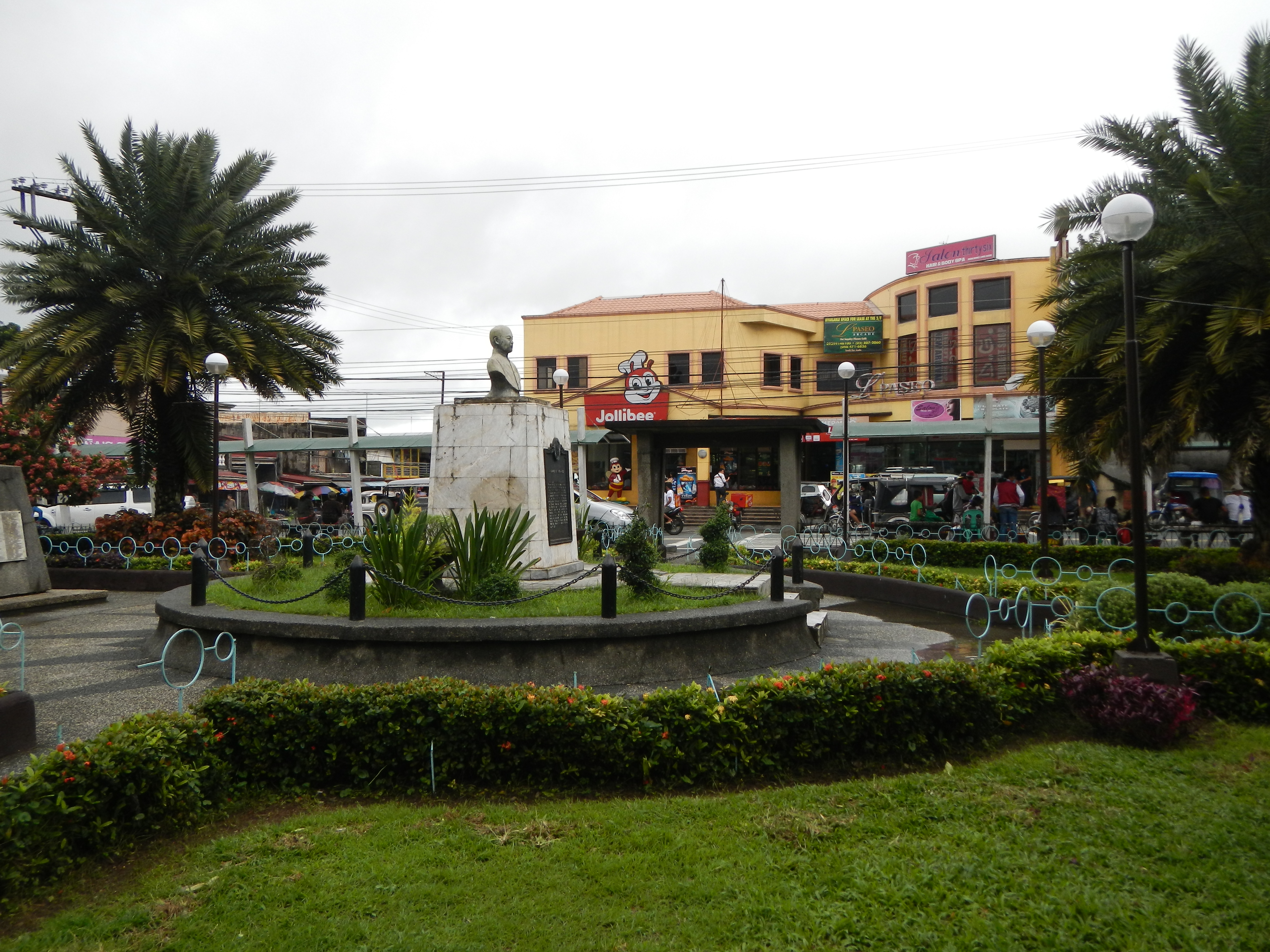
The Central Plaza and the L-Paseo Mall (a Jollibee and a Mercury Drug store also is seen in the background)

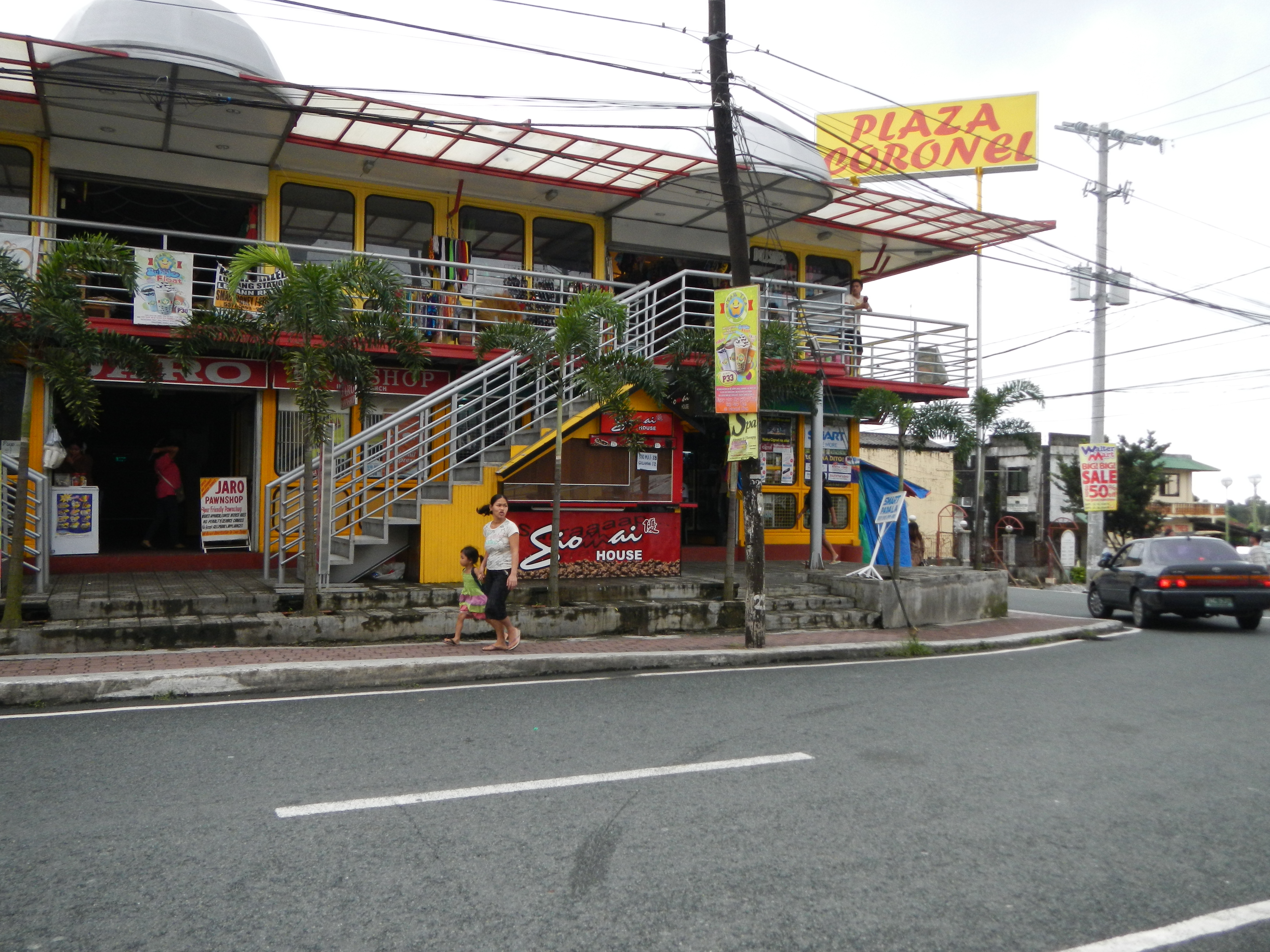
Plaza Coronel

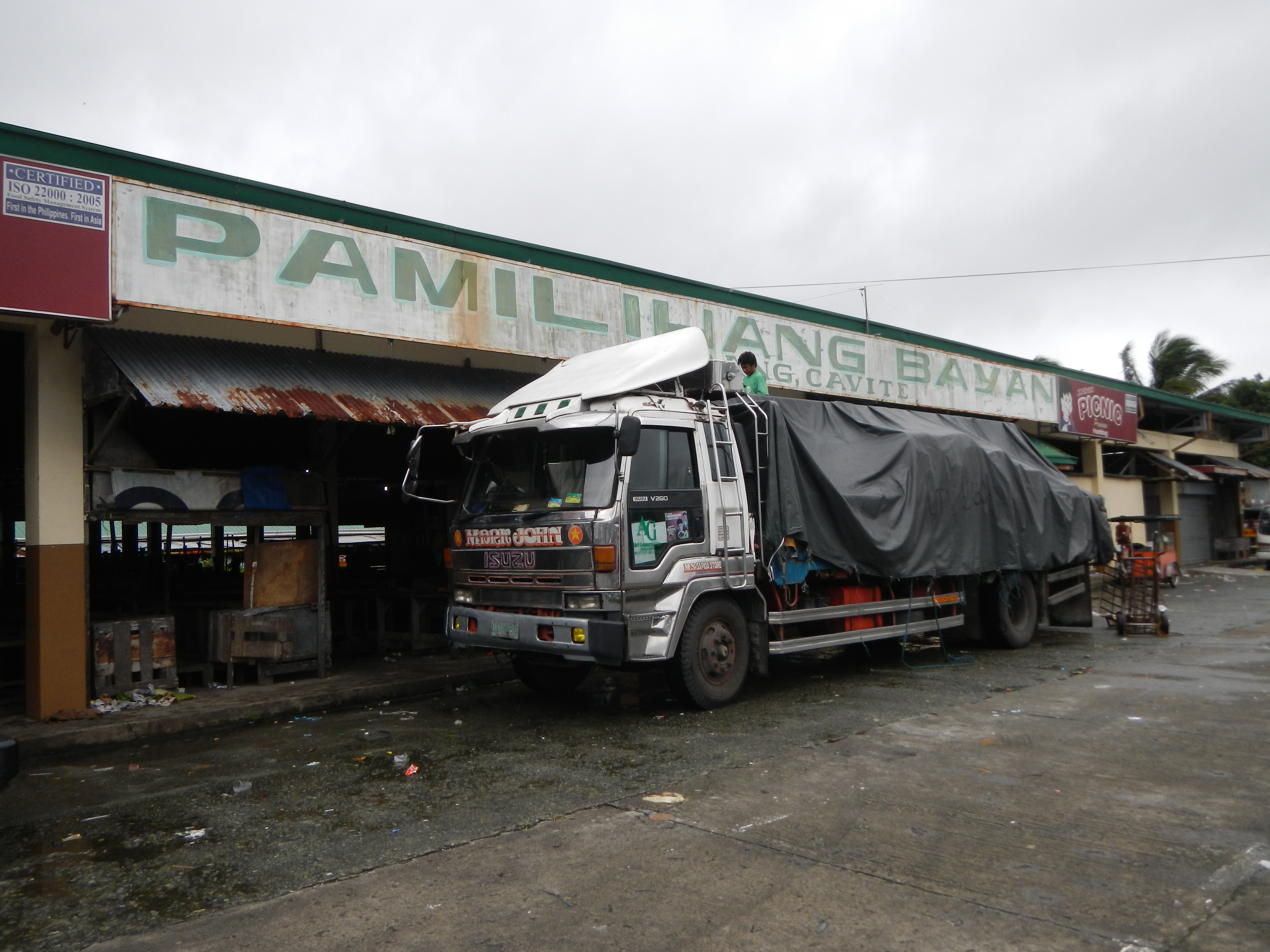
Indang Public Market Facade

=== Agriculture ===
The economy of Indang largely depends on agriculture. It is a first-class municipality. The 80.45% or 7,176.38 hectares are primarily devoted to agriculture. They are predominantly planted with various types of crops like coconut, banana, coffee, fruit trees, and pineapple, while there are small portions of rice, root crops, vegetables, and corn. Most farmers are engaged in multi-cropping farming system. The largest number of employment is farming and trading of agricultural products. Livestock and poultry raisers occupied an area of about 22.76 hectares or 0.32% of the total agricultural area.

Indang has a public market, located in Poblacion 4, where goods such as vegetables, seafood, meat, and household items are sold.

On the trade and industry, existing commercial and agribusiness establishments play a relatively major role in the predominantly agri-based economy of Indang.

Municipal record on this establishment shows the wholesale and retail trade stores are clustered within the poblacion or urban area while in the rural, the trading establishments are dominated by sari-sari stores.

Agro-business commercial farms raise large volumes of livestock and poultry. As per record of the municipal agricultural office, there are existing hog farms, broiler farms, layer and breeder farms.

Indang Public Market and Slaughterhouse stand on 20,316 square metre government-owned property along J. Dimabiling St., Poblacion IV. This public market has three simple market buildings and "Bagsakan" for wholesale trading. The slaughterhouse occupies an area of 1,800 square metres, which is adjacent to meat section of market building. It has complete facilities like corral and hog-holding pen with drainage and sanitation facilities.

== Infrastructure ==
=== Transportation ===
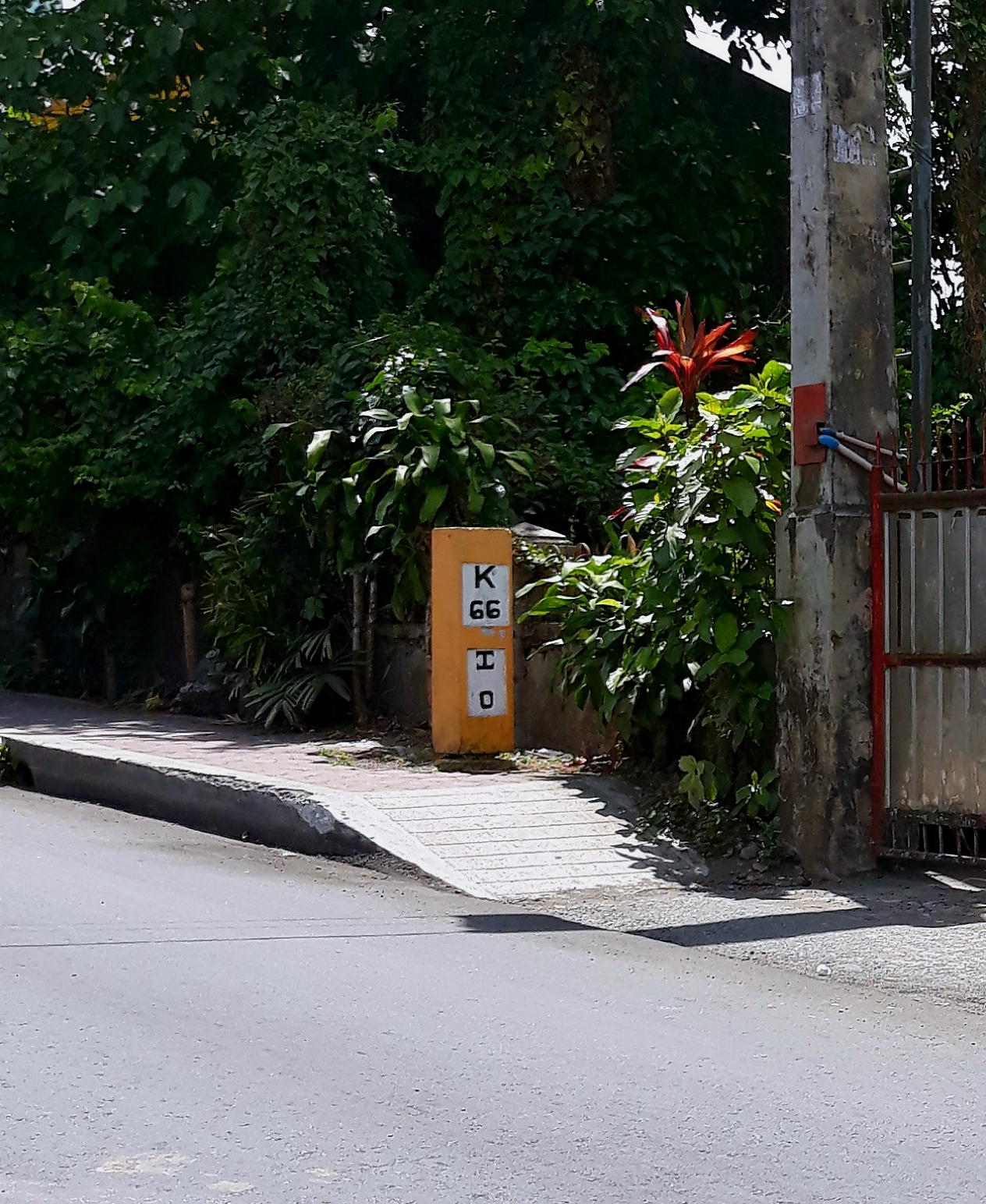
The kilometre zero of Indang along De Ocampo Street

Land transportation is the principal mode of transporting goods and services in Indang and its neighbouring municipalities and cities. Vehicular routes going to other municipalities are:

- Indang-Mendez-Tagaytay via Indang–Mendez Rd., then Mendez–Tagaytay Rd.;
- Indang-Alfonso via Indang–Alfonso Rd.;
- Indang-Naic via Naic–Indang Rd.;
- Indang-Trece Martires-Dasmariñas via Trece Martires–Indang Rd. passing to Governor's Drive; and
- Indang-Pasay (Baclaran) via Trece Martires–Indang Rd., Governor's Drive (Trece Martires) and Aguinaldo Highway (Dasmariñas).

There are several types of vehicles traversing the place, but the most commonly used vehicles for public conveyances are busses, jeepneys and a number of tricycles plying within the Poblacion area and nearby barangays.

Indang has 25.57 km barangay roads, 4.982 km municipal roads, 28.64 km provincial roads, 29.64 km national roads, and 46.433 km farm-to-market roads within the municipality. The barangay roads primarily provide the delivery of goods, services, and facilities which bring improvement on the living condition of the rural populace. On the other hand, the 93.10% of farm-to-market roads are not passable particularly during rainy seasons. The widening and improvement of these roads would ensure faster, easier, and safer transport of farm products. There are 30 bridges connecting the 36 barangays of this municipality, these are classified as national, provincial, and barangay bridges.

=== Utilities ===
==== Water ====
The original waterworks system was constructed in 1922–1924 with Ikloy Spring as its source and covers only the Poblacion. The system consists of a spring chamber, pumphouse with hydro turbine prime over and centrifugal pump, ground reservoir, 2 km transmission pipelines and distribution facilities. In 1980, a separate distribution pipe and ground reservoir in Barangay Kaytambog was included in the system. Total registered concessionaires were 463 as of August 1980. Water production from the spring source is 580 cubic metre of which only 26.6 percent is accounted for. The total water demand for various design years is derived from the demands for domestic, commercial, institutional and public faucets demands including an allowance for leakage and wastage. The possible sources of water supply for Indang are springs, namely, Ikloy, Ipie I and Ipie II. All the springs emanate from fissures on the contact between permeable pyroclastics and impermeable tuff above the river course. The full production of Ikloy Spring alone is estimated to meet the water demand of Indang Water District.

==== Electricity ====
The electric services are provided by Meralco, the sole electric power distributor in Indang and Greater Manila Area.

==== Telecommunication ====
The Philippine Long Distance Telephone Company (PLDT) and Digital Telecommunications Philippines (Digitel) are the two leading telephone companies serving the municipality. The PLDT has its branch office at barangay Kaytapos, while the Digitel branch office is located at Tagaytay. Year 2010, Globe Telecom is now operating their telephone lines bundled with DSL to selected barangays of Indang including Poblacion, Kaytapos and Alulod.

Smart Communications, Globe Telecom and Dito Telecommunity installed their Mobile Base Transceiver Stations and Telecommunication Antenna Tower in the locality. Smart has currently five mobile base station towers, Globe has only eight mobile transceiver facility. Cellular phones are commonly used by the residents especially in remote barangay where telephone landline services are not available.

Newspapers, magazines, and other related reading materials reach the municipality. Likewise, radio and television sets have a good reception.

==== Healthcare ====
M. V. Santiago Medical & Diagnostic Centre is the only hospital in Indang, located in A. Luna St. Poblacion 3, Indang, Cavite and was founded on May 27, 2013.

== Government ==
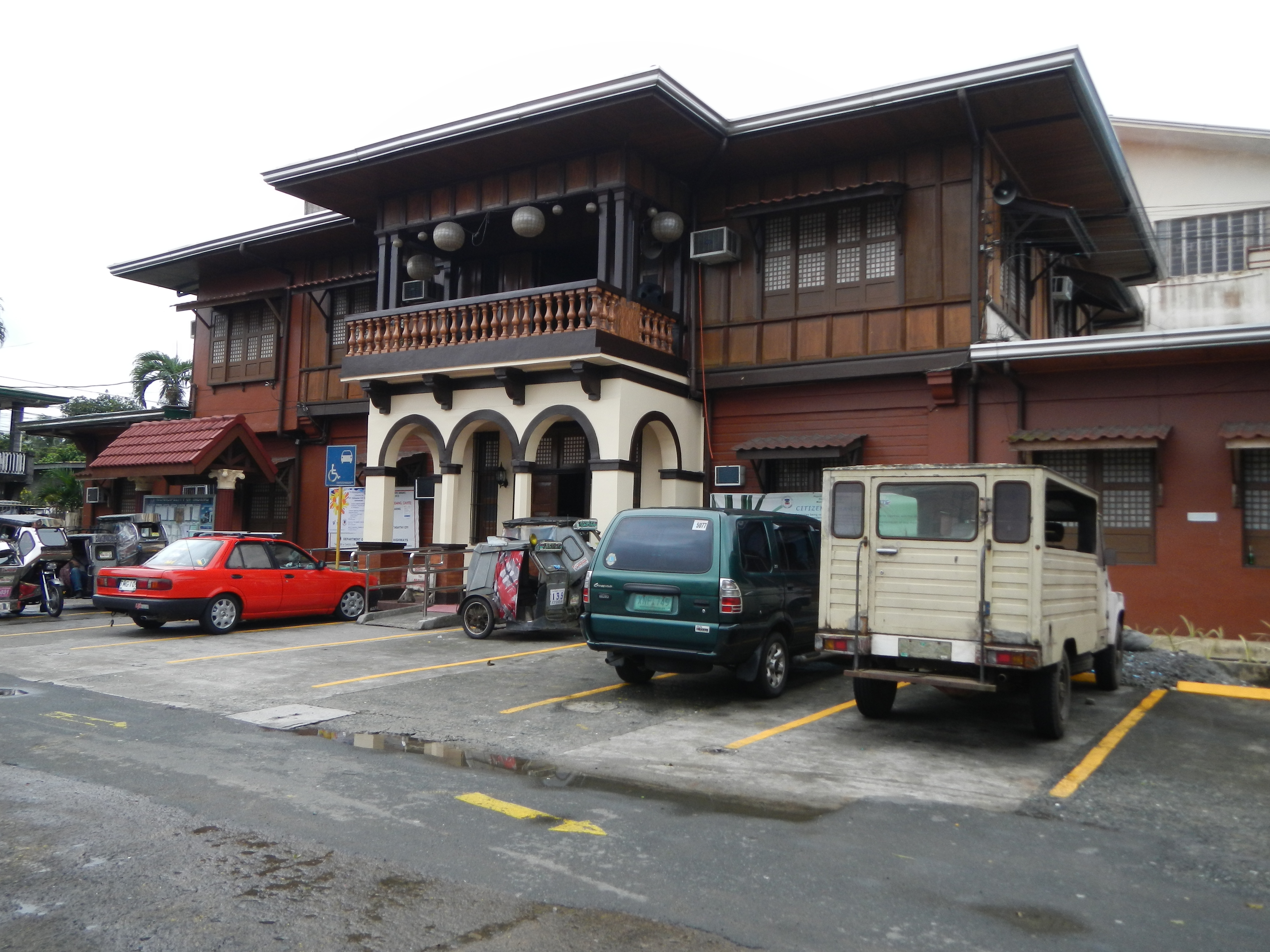
The old Municipal Hall of Indang

=== Elected officials ===
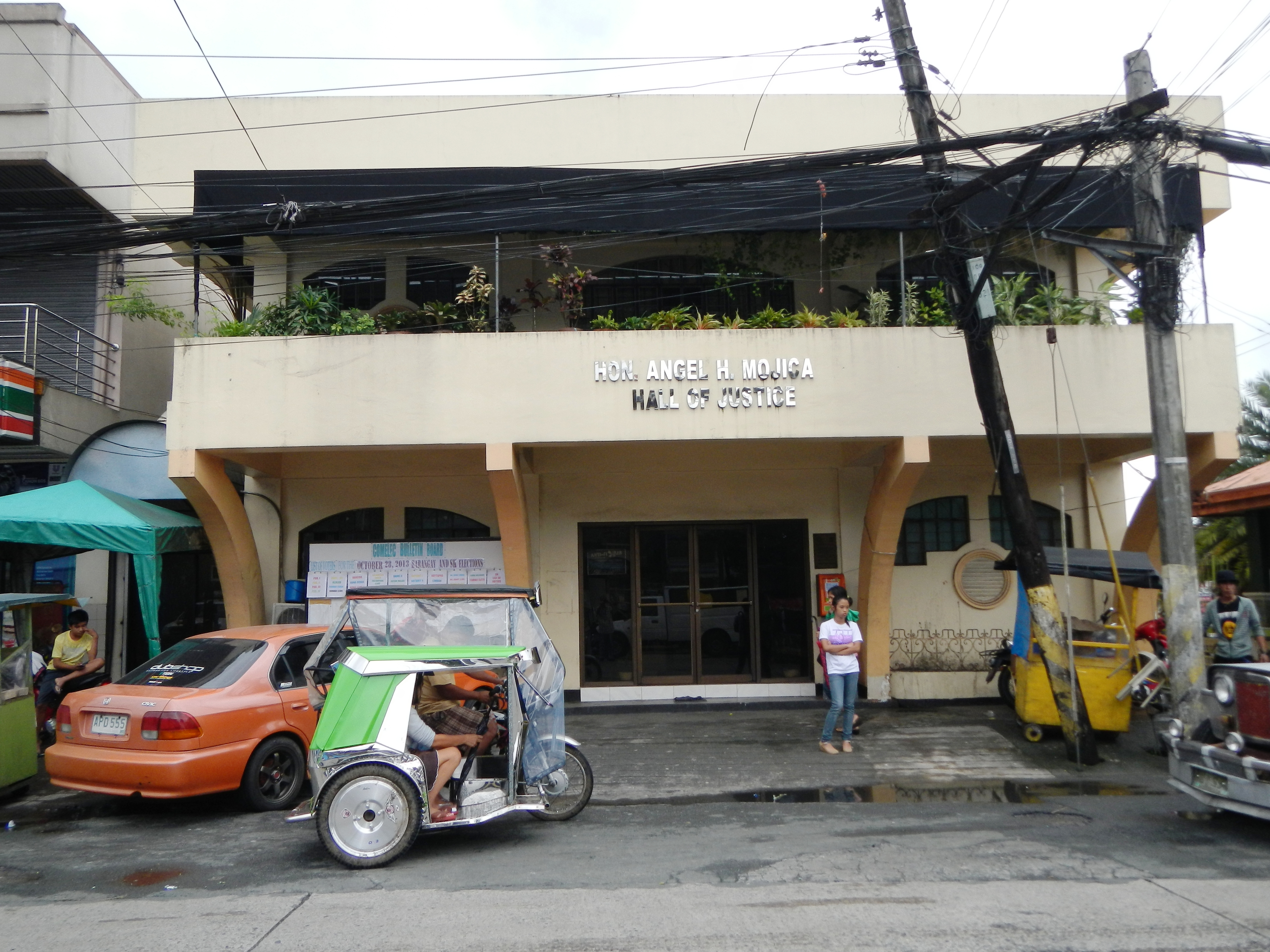
Indang Hall of Justice

The following are the elected officials of the town elected last May 12, 2025 which serves until 2028:

Position	Official
Mayor	Virgilio F. Fidel (NUP)
Vice Mayor	Ferdinand T. Papa (NUP)

Sangguniang Bayan Members	Party
Exequiel D. Penus	LP
John Mark M. Cayao	Independent
Joel R. Carungcong	NUP
Constancio S. Telmo Jr.	NUP
Danilo V. Masangcay	NUP
Ronald D. Bernarte	NUP
Chrissel R. Borja	NUP
Jose Joezel T. Pareño	LP
LNB President
Elmer Torres
SK Federation President
Junuel Keith M. Ayos

==== Barangay officials ====
Barangay	Chairman	Settlement Type
Agus-os	Loreto Mojica	Rural
Alulod	Marlito Penus	Urban
Banaba Cerca	Herminigildo Mojica	Rural
Banaba Lejos	Manuel Dela Cruz	Rural
Bancod	Joselito Atas	Urban
Buna Cerca	Rogelio Taglinao	Rural
Buna Lejos I	Napoleon Perido	Rural
Buna Lejos II	Elmer Torres	Rural
Calumpang Cerca	Vergel J C. Fidel	Rural
Calumpang Lejos	Romeo Sierra	Rural
Carasuchi	Cleofas Costelo	Rural
Daine I	Arnold Pegollo	Rural
Daine II	Hermogenes Signo	Rural
Guyam Malaki	Vivencio Matilla	Rural
Guyam Munti	Marlon Pagkaliwangan	Rural
Harasan	Reynalito Salvacion	Rural
Kayquit I	Bernardo Ambas	Rural
Kayquit II	Roberto Aterrado	Rural
Kayquit III	Reiner Ersando	Rural
Kaytambog	Kristopher Romen	Rural
Kaytapos	Promencio Crooc	Urban
Limbon	Emelita Sarmiento	Rural
Lumampong Balagbag	Nolito Librea	Rural
Lumampong Halayhay	Arnel Pulido	Rural
Mahabangkahoy Cerca	Norman Clamor	Rural
Mahabangkahoy Lejos	Kristel Ann Rodil	Rural
Mataas na Lupa	Camilo Lontoc	Urban
Poblacion I	Moammar Nasserdin Enaami	Urban
Poblacion II	Nonato Guerra	Urban
Poblacion III	Arnel Kasaysayan	Urban
Poblacion IV	Marcelino Peñaflorida	Urban
Pulo	Wilfredo Perido	Rural
Tambo Balagbag	Nelson Peji	Rural
Tambo Ilaya	Menando Sierra Jr.	Rural
Tambo Kulit	Emerlito V. Espineli Sr.	Rural
Tambo Malaki	Cornelio Salazar	Rural

== Education ==
There are two schools district offices which govern all educational institutions within the municipality. They oversee the management and operations of all private and public, from primary to secondary schools. These are the Indang I Schools District Office, and Indang II Schools District Office.

=== Primary and elementary schools ===
- Academia de San Vicente Ferrer
- Agus-os Elementary School
- Alulod Elementary School
- Banaba Cerca Elementary School
- Banaba Lejos Elementary School
- Bancod Elementary School
- Buna Cerca Elementary School
- Buna Lejos Elementary School
- Calumpang Lejos Elementary School
- Carasuchi Elementary School
- Daine Elementary School
- Daine Western Cavite Institute
- Dr. Alfredo Pio De Roda Elementary School
- Guyam Elementary School
- Guyam Munti Elementary School
- Hillcrest Periwinkle School
- Holy Family School of Indang
- Indang Central Elementary School
- Indang Christian Academy
- Indang East Elementary School
- Kayquit Elementary School
- Kaytambog Elementary School
- Kaytapos Elementary School
- Liceo dela Concepcion
- Lumampong Balagbag Elementary School
- Lumampong Elementary School
- Lycee de San Antonio Montessori
- Mahabang Kahoy Cerca Elementary School
- Mahabang Kahoy Lejos Elementary School
- Mataas Na Lupa Elementary School
- Nazarene Christian School
- Perpetual Cavite Institute
- Royal Palm Academy
- Saint Gregory Academy
- Sebastien Montessori
- Tambo Elementary School
- Tambo Munti-Kulit Elementary School

=== Secondary schools ===
- Cavite State University - Science High School
- Calumpang Integrated National High School
- Indang Integrated National High School
- Lumampong Integrated National High School

=== Higher educational institution ===
Cavite State University (Don Severino de las Alas Campus)

- Cavite State University The Cavite State University, (CvSU) (Filipino: Pamantasang Estado ng Cavite), is a university in the province of Cavite in the Philippines. Its 72-hectare (180-acre) main campus, known as the Don Severino de las Alas Campus, is located in the Municipality of Indang, Cavite about 60 km (37 mi) southwest of Manila. The educational institution has ten other campuses spread all over the province. The school was established initially as an intermediate school by the Thomasites, a group of American teachers brought by the United States during the early part of the American colonial period to revamp the system of education in the country. By 1964, the school has grown into a college known as the Don Severino Agricultural College (DSAC). It became a university on January 22, 1998, and was renamed as the Cavite State University.

== Notable people ==
- George Garcia, chairperson of the Commission on Elections (2022–present)
- Abeng Remulla, governor of Cavite
- Crispin Diego Remulla, representative for Cavite's 7th congressional district
- Jesus Crispin Remulla, Secretary of Justice, former representative and Cavite governor

== Sister city ==
- Gangneung, South Korea

== See also ==
- Kalamay Buna
