= Abraham Tolentino =

Filipino politician and sports administrator (born 1964)

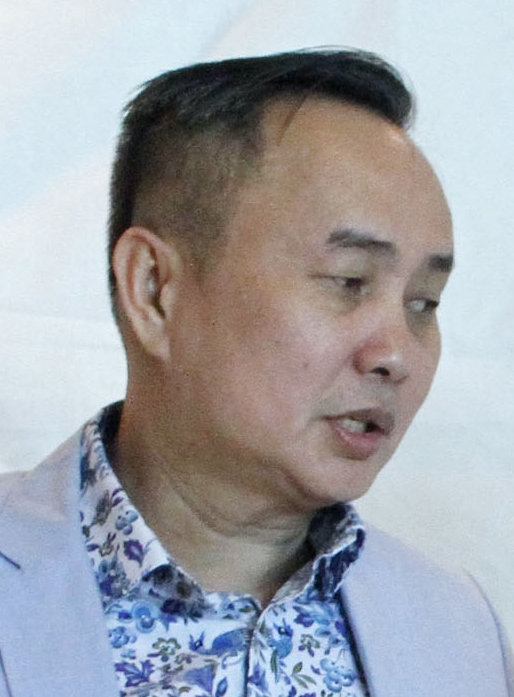
- Tolentino in 2018

Mayor of Tagaytay
- In office June 30, 2022 – June 30, 2025
- Preceded by: Agnes Tolentino
- Succeeded by: Aizack Brent Tolentino
- In office June 30, 2004 – June 30, 2013
- Preceded by: Francis Tolentino
- Succeeded by: Agnes Tolentino

Deputy Speaker of the House of Representatives of the Philippines
- In office December 16, 2020 – June 30, 2022
- Preceded by: Lord Allan Velasco

Member of the House of Representatives from Cavite
- In office June 30, 2019 – June 30, 2022
- Preceded by: District established
- Succeeded by: Aniela Bianca Tolentino
- Constituency: 8th district
- In office June 30, 2013 – June 30, 2019
- Preceded by: Jesus Crispin Remulla
- Succeeded by: Jesus Crispin Remulla
- Constituency: 7th district

12th President of the Philippine Olympic Committee
- Incumbent
- Assumed office July 28, 2019
- Preceded by: Joey Romasanta

Member of the Tagaytay City Council
- In office June 30, 1998 – June 30, 2004

Personal details
- Born: Abraham Ng Tolentino; February 23, 1964 (age 62) Tagaytay, Cavite, Philippines
- Party: NUP (2021–present)
- Other political affiliations: PDP–Laban (2016–2021); Magdalo (2015–2016); Liberal (2010–2016); Lakas–Kampi–CMD (2008–2010); Lakas–CMD (1997–2008)
- Spouse: Agnes Delgado
- Children: 3 (including Aniela and Athena)
- Relatives: Francis Tolentino (brother)
- Education: San Beda College (BS); Lyceum of the Philippines University (MS)
- Occupation: Politician, Sportsperson

Abraham "Bambol" Ng Tolentino (born February 23, 1964) is a Filipino politician who currently serves as the president of the Philippine Olympic Committee. He previously served as the mayor of Tagaytay from 2004 to 2013 and from 2022 to 2025, representative of Cavite's 8th district from 2019 to 2022 and the 7th district from 2013 to 2019.

== Early life and education ==
Abraham Tolentino was born on February 23, 1964. He is the youngest of the two sons of Atty. Isaac O. Tolentino, who was the longest-serving mayor of Tagaytay. He is the brother of Francis Tolentino, also a former mayor of Tagaytay and former senator.

Tolentino had his primary education at the St. Augustine School in Mendez, Cavite, and his secondary education at the St. Anthony School in Malate, Manila. He earned his Bachelor of Science in Commerce (Major in Management) degree at San Beda College (now San Beda University) and his Master of Science in Fiscal Studies at the Lyceum of the Philippines University. Tolentino took an Executive Course on Leadership, Chaos, Conflict & Courage for the 21st Century at the John F. Kennedy School of Government, Harvard University and Executive Course on National Security at the Institute for Extramural and Continuing Studies, National Defense College of the Philippines.

== Political career ==
In 1998, he was elected as City Councilor of Tagaytay and served until 2004. He ran for mayor in 2004 and won; he was re-elected in 2007 and 2010. In 2013, he defeated Gilbert Remulla as Congressman of the newly created 7th district of Cavite. He was re-elected in 2016 and in 2019, this time at the newly created 8th district.

His other positions include:

- Member - Commission of Appointments
- Vice Chairman - Committee of Agrarian Reform
- Chairman - Committee of Agriculture and Food
- Vice Chairman - Committee of National Defense
- Vice Chairman - Committee of Rules and Resolutions

On July 10, 2020, Tolentino is one of the 70 representatives who voted to "yes" to deny the franchise renewal of ABS-CBN. On December 16, he was named as one of the Deputy Speakers of the House of Representatives.

Tolentino, being term-limited as representative, ran for Mayor of Tagaytay in 2022 and won, running unopposed. However, he chose not to seek re-election in 2025.

== Involvement in sports ==
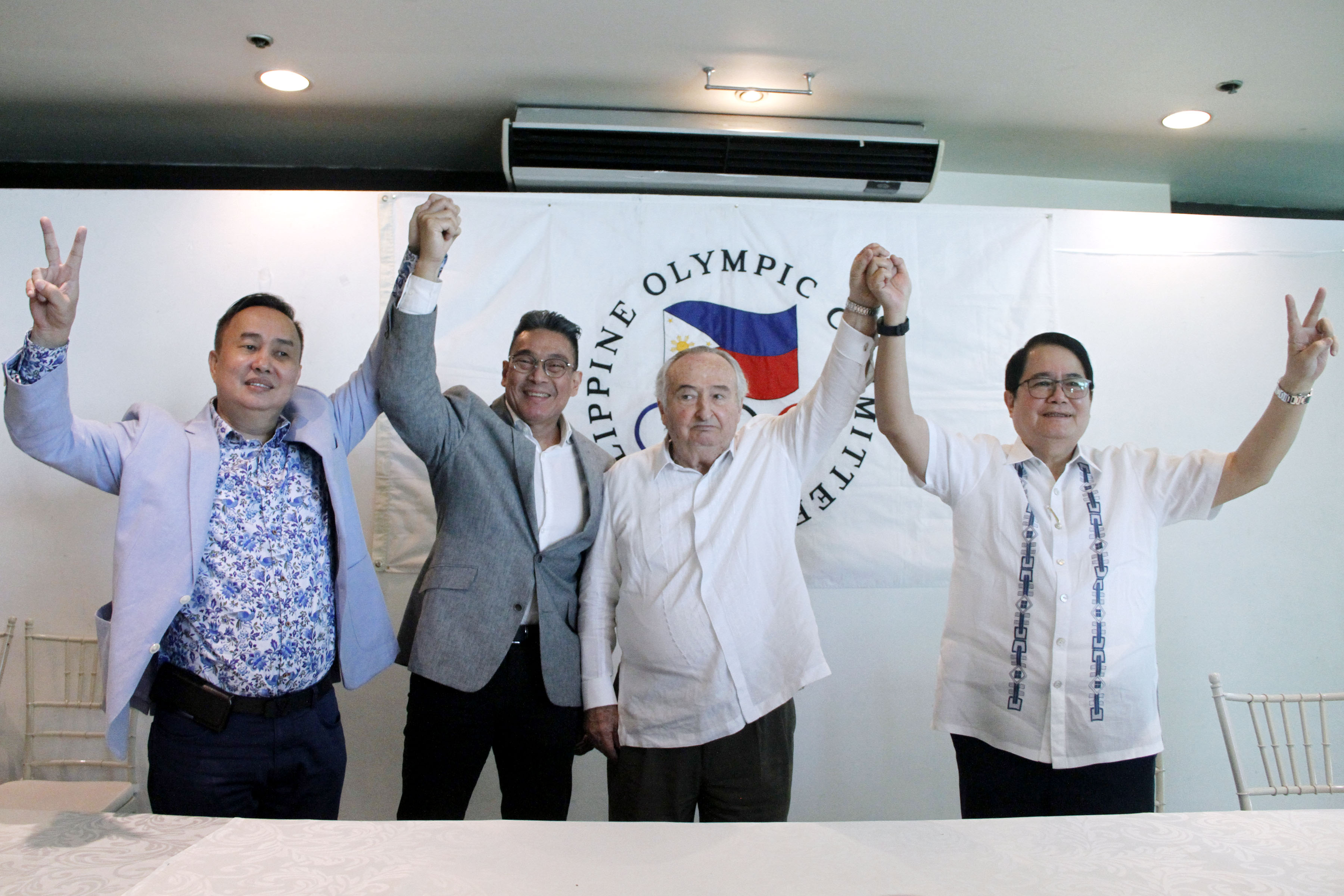
Tolentino (left) after the 2018 Philippine Olympic Committee election held at the Wack Wack Golf and Country Club, Mandaluyong

Tolentino was elected Chairman of the Philippine Olympic Committee in 2018. He later served as the President of the Philippine Olympic Committee since 2019. He secured a second mandate after winning the 2024 election.

He also served as the Secretary-General of FIDE/World Chess Organization, President of ASEAN Chess Zone 3.3, Secretary-General of the National Chess Federation of the Philippines, and is currently the President of Philcycling.

== Personal life ==
Tolentino is married to Dr. Agnes (née Delgado) Tolentino, the incumbent vice mayor and former mayor of Tagaytay. They have three children. Their eldest daughter, Aniela Bianca, is the incumbent representative of the 8th district of Cavite since 2022. Their second daughter, Athena Bryana, last served as the Governor of Cavite from 2024 to 2025. Their youngest son, Aizack Brent, is the mayor of Tagaytay since 2025.

He is a Past Grand Master of the Free & Accepted Masons of the Philippines.

Political offices
Preceded by Francis Tolentino	Mayor of Tagaytay; 2004–2013	Succeeded by Agnes Tolentino
Preceded by Agnes Tolentino	Mayor of Tagaytay; 2022–2025	Succeeded by Aizack Brent Tolentino
House of Representatives of the Philippines
Preceded by Jesus Crispin Remulla	Representative, 7th District of Cavite; 2013–2019	Succeeded by Jesus Crispin Remulla
New district	Representative, 8th District of Cavite; 2019–2022	Succeeded by Aniela Tolentino
Olympic Games
Preceded by Joey Romasanta	President of the Philippine Olympic Committee; 2019–present	Incumbent
