= National Prosecution Service =

Prosecutorial agency of the Philippines

- Pambansang Serbisyo ng Pag-uusig

Agency overview
- Jurisdiction: Philippines
- Agency executive: Richard Anthony Fadullon, Prosecutor General; Senior Deputy State Prosecutor; Theodore Villanueva, Senior Deputy State Prosecutor
- Parent department: Department of Justice

The National Prosecution Service (NPS; Filipino: Pambansang Serbisyo ng Pag-uusig) is the official prosecutorial agency of the Philippines. Although it is an official prosecutorial agency, it is not autonomous from the Department of Justice unlike its counterparts such as the Philippine National Police, National Bureau of Investigation, Philippine Drug Enforcement Agency, National Intelligence Coordinating Agency, Bureau of Customs, Bureau of Corrections, and the Bureau of Immigration.

== History ==
The National Prosecution Service has existed before its creation in the form of the Prosecution Staff of the Bureau of Justice and later, the Department of Justice during the American colonial era. Through Presidential Decree No. 1275 signed by President Ferdinand Marcos on April 11, 1978, the Prosecution Staff was reorganized and the National Prosecution Service was created. P.D. No. 1275 was later amended and repealed by Republic Act No. 10071, or the Prosecution Service Act of 2010, which strengthened the powers and organization of the National Prosecution Service.

== Leadership ==
- President of the Philippines – Pres. Bongbong Marcos
- Secretary of Justice – Sec. Jesus Crispin Remulla
- Prosecutor General of the National Prosecution Service – Richard Anthony Fadullon

== Organization ==
The National Prosecution Service is divided into four levels:

1. The Prosecution Staff, headed by the Prosecutor General, which is administratively under the Office of the Secretary of Justice;
2. The Regional Prosecution Offices, headed by Regional Prosecutors;
3. The Offices of the Provincial Prosecutors; and
4. The Offices of the City Prosecutors.

Regional Offices	Area of Responsibility	Provincial/City Offices	Regional Prosecutor
National Capital Region Prosecution Office (NCRPO)	National Capital Region – Metro Manila	17 (1 Provincial, 16 City Offices)	Prosecutor General
Office of the Regional Prosecutor – La Union	Region I – Ilocos Region	17 (7 Provincial, 10 City Offices)	RP. Nonnatus Caesar R. Rojas
Office of the Regional Prosecutor – Cagayan	Region II – Cagayan Valley	14 (8 Provincial, 6 City Offices)	RP. Rommel C. Baligod
Office of the Regional Prosecutor – Pampanga	Region III – Central Luzon	20 (6 Provincial, 14 City Offices)	RP. Jesus C. Simbulan
Office of the Regional Prosecutor – San Pablo	Region IV – CALABARZON and MIMAROPA	30 (11 Provincial, 19 City Offices)	RP. Ernesto C. Medoza
Office of the Regional Prosecutor – Legaspi	Region V – Bicol Region	13 (6 Provincial, 7 City Offices)	RP. Mary May B. De Leoz
Office of the Regional Prosecutor – Iloilo	Region VI – Western Visayas	22 (6 Provincial, 16 City Offices)	RP. Kenneth John N. Amamanglon
Office of the Regional Prosecutor – Cebu	Region VII – Central Visayas/ Cebu	20 (4 Provincial, 16 City Offices)	RP. Fernando K. Gubalane
Office of the Regional Prosecutor – Tacloban	Region VIII – Eastern Visayas/ Leyte	13 (6 Provincial, 7 City Offices)	RP. Irwin A. Maraya
Office of the Regional Prosecutor – Zamboanga	Region IX – Zamboanga Peninsula	8 (3 Provincial, 5 City Offices)	RP. Dennis F. Araojo
Office of the Regional Prosecutor – Cagayan De Oro	Region X – Northern Mindanao	14 (5 Provincial, 9 City Offices)	RP. Merlynn B. Uy
Office of the Regional Prosecutor – Davao	Region XI – Davao Region	12 (5 Provincial, 7 City Offices)	RP. Janet Grace D. Fabrero
Office of the Regional Prosecutor – Koronadal	Region XII – SOCKSARGEN / Bangsamoro barangays in North Cotabato	9 (4 Provincial, 5 City Offices)	RP. Al P. Calica
Office of the Regional Prosecutor – Caraga	Region XIII – CARAGA/ Butuan	11 (5 Provincial, 6 City Offices)	RP. John S. Magdaraog
Office of the Regional Prosecutor – ARMM (Note: The Office of the Regional Prosecutor - ARMM is as is because there are no legislation changing and reorganizing the Office. The only legislation provided are Executive Order No. 36, s. 2001 on the administrative subdivision of the Regions and the Department of Justice Circular No. 73, s. 2001, dated November 15, 2001.)	BARMM – Bangsamoro Autonomous Region in Muslim Mindanao and Cotabato City / Excluding Bangsamoro barangays in North Cotabato	7 (5 Provincial, 2 City Offices)	PP. Norma M. Tanggol (Officer-in-Charge)
Office of the Regional Prosecutor – Cordillera (Note: The Office of the Regional Prosecutor for the Cordillera Administrative Region is non-existent as the Government of Cory Aquino and the Congress has never set its establishment as a priority.)	Cordillera Administrative Region	None	None

=== Abbreviations ===
- PG - Prosecutor General
- RP - Regional Prosecutor
- PP - Provincial Prosecutor
- CP - City Prosecutor

== Rank structure ==
The current rank system of the NPS as provided under Section 15 of Republic Act No. 10071:

Rank	Position/Title
Prosecutor V	Senior Deputy State Prosecutors; Regional Prosecutors; Provincial Prosecutors or City Prosecutors of provinces or cities with at least twenty-five (25) prosecutors, and City Prosecutors of cities within a metropolitan area established by law.
Prosecutor IV	Deputy State Prosecutors; Deputy Regional Prosecutors; Provincial Prosecutors or City Prosecutors of provinces or cities with less than twenty-five (25) prosecutors; and; Deputy Provincial Prosecutors or Deputy City Prosecutors of provinces or cities within a metropolitan area established by law.
Prosecutor III	Senior Assistant State Prosecutors and Senior Assistant Regional Prosecutors; Deputy Provincial or Deputy City Prosecutors of provinces or cities with less than twenty- five (25) prosecutors; and; Senior Assistant Provincial Prosecutors or Senior Assistant City Prosecutors.
Prosecutor II	Assistant State Prosecutors; Assistant Regional Prosecutors; and; Assistant Provincial Prosecutors or Assistant City
Prosecutor I	Associate Provincial Prosecutors or Associate City Prosecutors.
