= Athena Tolentino =

Filipino politician

The Honorable Athena Tolentino
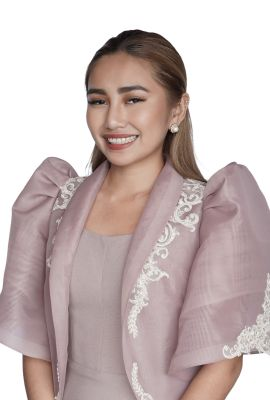

38th Governor of Cavite
- In office October 8, 2024 – June 30, 2025
- Vice Governor: Shernan Jaro
- Preceded by: Jonvic Remulla
- Succeeded by: Abeng Remulla

Vice Governor of Cavite
- In office June 30, 2022 – October 8, 2024
- Governor: Jonvic Remulla
- Preceded by: Jolo Revilla
- Succeeded by: Shernan Jaro

Member of Tagaytay City Council
- In office June 30, 2019 – June 30, 2022

Personal details
- Born: Athena Bryana Delgado Tolentino; June 11, 1998 (age 28) Quezon City, Philippines
- Party: NUP
- Parents: Abraham Tolentino (father); Agnes Tolentino (mother)
- Relatives: Aniela Tolentino (sister); Francis Tolentino (uncle)
- Education: Laurentian University (BA)
- Profession: Politician

Athena Bryana Delgado Tolentino (born June 11, 1998) is a Filipino politician who served as the governor of Cavite from 2024 to 2025. She is the first woman and the youngest to become the governor of Cavite.

A member of a political family active in Tagaytay, Tolentino previously served as a member of the Tagaytay City Council from 2019 to 2022 before being elected vice governor of Cavite in 2022, as the running mate of the incumbent governor Jonvic Remulla. Upon Remulla's resignation in October 2024, Tolentino assumed the governorship of the province.

== Early life ==
Tolentino was born on June 11, 1998, to politicians Agnes (née Delgado) and Abraham Tolentino. Her family is politically active, holding offices at the local level in Tagaytay and at the provincial level in Cavite.

== Political career ==
=== Councilor of Tagaytay (2019-2022) ===
Tolentino was elected councilor of Tagaytay in 2019, serving for one term until 2022.

=== Vice governor of Cavite (2022–2024) ===
Tolentino was elected vice governor of Cavite in the 2022 elections as the running mate of incumbent governor Jonvic Remulla. At the age of 24, she became the youngest ever to be elected vice governor of Cavite, beating the record set by her predecessor Jolo Revilla, who was 25 when he was elected in 2013.

On October 7, 2024, Tolentino dropped her reelection bid for vice governor in anticipation to her elevation as the governor of Cavite, following the impending appointment of Governor Jonvic Remulla as secretary of the Interior and Local Government. As vice governor, she was succeeded by provincial board member Shernan Jaro.

=== Governor of Cavite (2024–2025) ===
Tolentino assumed the governorship of Cavite on October 8, 2024, upon Remulla's resignation, becoming the first woman to serve in the position. Taking office at the age of 26, she was also the youngest person to hold the office.

Tolentino intends to continue Remulla's programs and projects in the remaining months of her term. Tolentino plans to not seek a full term in the 2025 elections, allowing her predecessor's nephew, board member Abeng Remulla, to seek the position.
