= Abeng Remulla =

Governor of Cavite since 2025

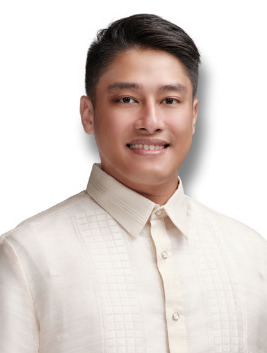
- Official portrait, 2026

39th Governor of Cavite
- Incumbent
- Assumed office June 30, 2025
- Vice Governor: Ram Revilla
- Preceded by: Athena Tolentino

Member of the Cavite Provincial Board from the 7th district
- In office March 16, 2023 – June 30, 2025 Serving with Raymundo del Rosario

Personal details
- Born: Francisco Gabriel Diaz Remulla; May 25, 1993 (age 33) Ermita, Manila, Philippines
- Party: NUP (2023–present)
- Spouse: Francesca Angela Tueres
- Parent: Jesus Crispin Remulla (father)
- Relatives: Ping Remulla (brother); Dia Maté (niece); Gilbert Remulla (uncle); Jonvic Remulla (uncle); Juanito Remulla Sr. (grandfather)
- Education: University of the Philippines Diliman (BA)
- Occupation: Politician

Francisco Gabriel "Abeng" Diaz Remulla (born May 25, 1993) is a Filipino politician who has served as the 39th governor of Cavite since 2025. A member of the National Unity Party, he previously served as a member of the Cavite Provincial Board from 2023 to 2025.

Born to a political family based in Cavite, Remulla studied public administration at the University of the Philippines Diliman. After graduating, he held senior roles in the offices of his father, Jesus Crispin, before succeeding his brother, Ping, in the provincial board. Following the appointment of his uncle Jonvic to the cabinet of Bongbong Marcos, he ran for governor of Cavite in the 2025 election and won, facing only minimal opposition.

== Early life and career ==
Francisco Gabriel "Abeng" Diaz Remulla was born on May 25, 1993, in Ermita, Manila. He is one of the five children of longtime politician Jesus Crispin Remulla, who was serving as a member of the Cavite Provincial Board at the time of his birth. A member of a political dynasty based in Cavite, Abeng is related to various politicians holding local and national positions, including his brother Ping, who has served as the representative for Cavite's seventh district since 2023.

Remulla studied public administration at the University of the Philippines Diliman. After obtaining his degree, he worked as the executive assistant to his father when he served as governor from 2016 to 2019. After his father was elected to the House of Representatives in 2019, he became his chief of staff, serving until he left office in June 2022 to serve as secretary of justice.

After Ping resigned as a board member after being elected in the 2023 special election to succeed their father in the lower house, the National Unity Party appointed Remulla to serve out his term. He was sworn in as a board member for the seventh district on March 16, 2023.

== Governor of Cavite ==
=== Election ===
Remulla's uncle Jonvic originally planned to run for reelection for a third consecutive term but withdrew his candidacy after President Bongbong Marcos appointed him as the Secretary of the Interior and Local Government. His successor, Athena Tolentino, chose not to seek a full term as governor and instead retired. Following their withdrawals, Remulla declared his bid for the province's governorship and filed his candidacy on October 8. Fellow Board Member Ram Revilla (not to be confused with the actor of the same name) ran as his running mate and was unopposed in the vice gubernatorial election.

During the campaign, Remulla sought to distinguish himself from his relatives by pursuing a leadership style distinct from past governors from his family. He defended his family's dynastic presence in provincial politics, stating that their constituents are happy with the projects that they have implemented while in power. Addressing the issue of crime, Remulla pledged to develop a centralized 911 mobile app to streamline emergency response. For the Senate election, he endorsed the candidacy of former Senator Francis Pangilinan, which publications deemed was key to a cross-regional coalition that contributed to Pangilinan's eventual victory.

With dynastic ties and facing only token opposition, media outlets regarded Remulla as the favorite to win the gubernatorial election. He was handily elected in the May 12 election, receiving 73.56% of the vote. His victory was proclaimed the following day, and he promptly became governor-elect.

=== Tenure ===
Remulla was sworn in as the 39th governor of Cavite on June 30, 2025.

== Personal life ==
Remulla is a member of the Upsilon Sigma Phi. He is married to Francesca Angela Tueres.

== Electoral history ==
Electoral history of Abeng Remulla
Year	Office	Party	Votes received				Result
Year	Office	Party	Total	%	P.	Swing	Result
2025	Governor of Cavite	NUP	1,058,412	73.56%	1st	—N/a	Won

Political offices
Preceded by Athena Tolentino	Governor of Cavite; 2025–	Incumbent
