= Ping Remulla =

Filipino politician (born 1990)

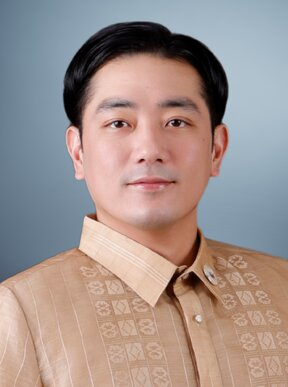
- Official portrait, 2026

Member of the Philippine House of Representatives from Cavite's 7th district
- Incumbent
- Assumed office February 28, 2023
- Preceded by: Jesus Crispin Remulla

Member of the Cavite Provincial Board from the 7th District
- In office June 30, 2019 – February 28, 2023 Serving with Angelito Langit (2019–2022); Raymundo del Rosario (2022–2023)

Member of the Indang Municipal Council
- In office 2018–2019

Personal details
- Born: Crispin Diego Diaz Remulla; September 28, 1990 (age 36) San Juan, Metro Manila, Philippines
- Party: NUP (2021–present)
- Other political affiliations: Nacionalista (2018–2021)
- Spouse: Georgia Parungao (m. 2021)
- Children: 2
- Parent: Jesus Crispin Remulla (father)
- Relatives: Abeng Remulla (brother); Dia Maté (niece); Gilbert Remulla (uncle); Jonvic Remulla (uncle); Juanito Remulla Sr. (grandfather)
- Education: Ateneo de Manila University (BEc); University of the Philippines Diliman (LL.B.)

Crispin Diego "Ping" Diaz Remulla (born September 28, 1990) is a Filipino politician who has served as the representative for Cavite's seventh district since 2023. Before his election, Remulla served as a member of the Cavite Provincial Board from 2019 to 2023, and as a member of the Indang Municipal Council from 2018 to 2019.

== Early years ==
=== Early life and education ===
Remulla was born on September 28, 1990, in the then-municipality of San Juan in Metro Manila. He is one of the sons of Jesus Crispin Remulla. He studied Bachelor of Economics in Ateneo de Manila University and took up Bachelor of Laws in University of the Philippines Diliman.

=== Early political career ===
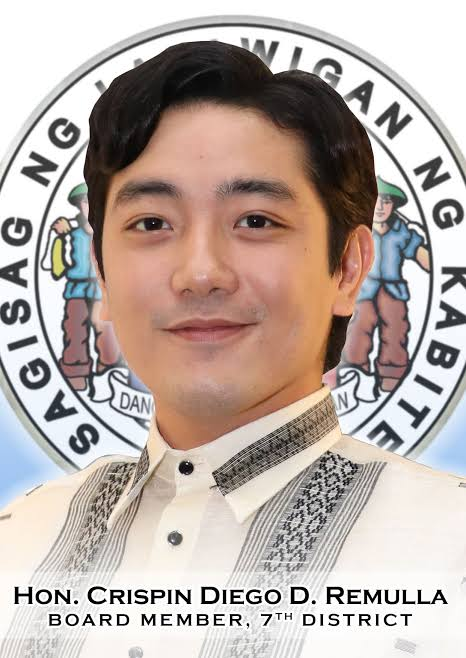
Official portrait of Remulla as the member of the Cavite Provincial Board.

He entered politics in 2018 upon becoming a municipal councilor of Indang, Cavite, from 2018, serving until 2019, when he sought a seat in the Cavite Provincial Board. He was elected, placing first out of four candidates. He was re-elected in 2022.

== House of Representatives ==
=== Elections ===
On May 23, 2022, Remulla's father, Jesus Crispin, was offered the position of secretary of justice under the incoming administration of then-president-elect Bongbong Marcos. He accepted the position, resigning his rights to the seat before his second consecutive term as a representative began to assume the office, triggering a special election for his seat. As the son of the previous congressman, the younger Remulla was seen as the favorite to win the election. He went on to win, receiving 66.68% of the votes.

Remulla was re-elected to a full term in 2025, garnering 80.88% of the votes.

==== Tenure ====
Remulla was sworn into office at the Batasang Pambansa Complex on February 28, 2023, three days following his election. His brother, Abeng, filled the seat he vacated in the Cavite Provincial Board to finish his term that would expire on June 30, 2025.

== Personal life ==
Remulla is married to Georgia Parungao, with whom he has two children.

Like his father, grandfather and uncles, he is an active member of Upsilon Sigma Phi.

== Electoral history ==
Electoral history of Ping Remulla
Year	Office	Party	Votes received				Result
Year	Office	Party	Total	%	P.	Swing	Result
2019	Board Member (Cavite–7th)	Nacionalista	111,380	36.12%	1st	—N/a	Won
2022	Board Member (Cavite–7th)	NUP	154,515	43.94%	1st	—N/a	Won
2023	Representative (Cavite–7th)	NUP	98,474	66.68%	1st	−33.32	Won
2025	Representative (Cavite–7th)	NUP	190,499	80.88%	1st	—N/a	Won

House of Representatives of the Philippines
Preceded by Jesus Crispin Remulla	Representative, 7th District of Cavite; 2023–present	Incumbent
