= Cavite's 7th congressional district =

Legislative district of the Philippines

- Constituency for the House of Representatives of the Philippines
- Location of Cavite within the Philippines

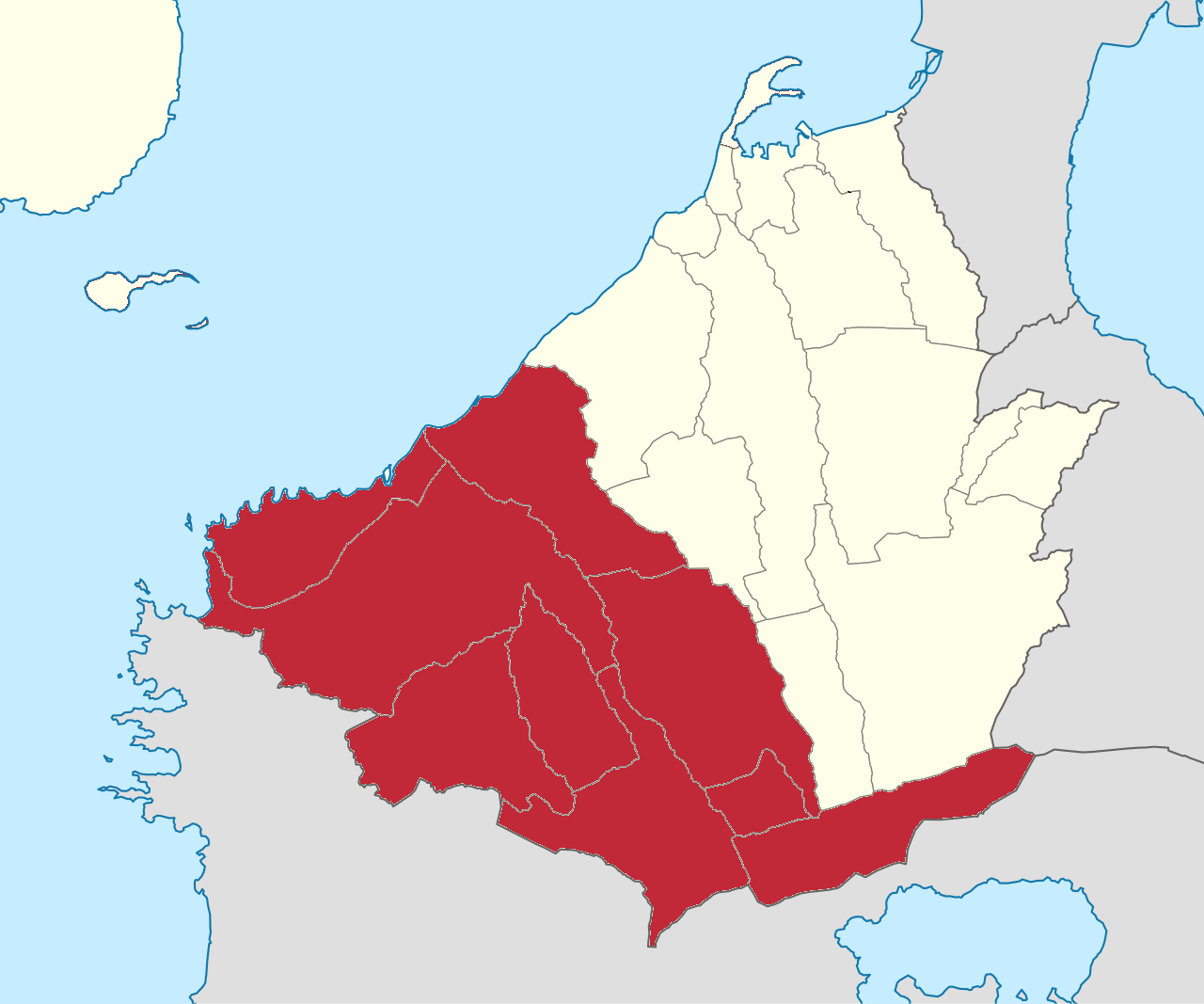
- District boundaries, 2010-2019
- Province: Cavite
- Region: Calabarzon
- Population: 633,219 (2020)
- Electorate: 365,184 (2022)
- Major settlements: 4 LGUs: City; Trece Martires; Municipalities; Amadeo; Indang; Tanza
- Area: 245.61 km^{2} (94.83 sq mi)

Current constituency
- Created: 2009
- Representative: Ping Remulla
- Political party: NUP
- Congressional bloc: Majority

Cavite's 7th congressional district is one of the eight congressional districts of the Philippines in the province of Cavite. It has been represented in the House of Representatives of the Philippines since 2010. The district comprises Cavite's de facto capital city of Trece Martires and the municipalities of Amadeo, Indang, and Tanza. It is currently represented in the 20th Congress by Ping Remulla of the National Unity Party (NUP).

The district assumed its present composition in 2019 following the reorganization of Cavite's congressional districts, which was prompted by General Trias's retention as the sole component of the 6th district. The former areas of the 6th district were transferred here along with Indang, while the remaining municipalities of the old 7th district were reassigned to the newly created 8th district.

== Representation history ==
#	Image	Member	Term of office		Congress	Party	Electoral history	Constituent LGUs
#	Image	Member	Start	End	Congress	Party	Electoral history	Constituent LGUs
=== Cavite's 7th district for the House of Representatives of the Philippines ===
District created July 27, 2009.
1		Jesus Crispin Remulla (born 1961)	June 30, 2010	June 30, 2013	15th	Nacionalista (Magdalo)	Redistricted from the 3rd district and re-elected in 2010.	2010–2019; Alfonso, General Emilio Aguinaldo, Indang, Magallanes, Maragondon, Mendez, Naic, Tagaytay, Ternate
2		Abraham Tolentino (born 1964)	June 30, 2013	June 30, 2019	16th	Liberal (Magdalo)	Elected in 2013.	2010–2019; Alfonso, General Emilio Aguinaldo, Indang, Magallanes, Maragondon, Mendez, Naic, Tagaytay, Ternate
2		Abraham Tolentino (born 1964)	June 30, 2013	June 30, 2019	17th	PDP-Laban	Re-elected in 2016. Redistricted to the 8th district.	2010–2019; Alfonso, General Emilio Aguinaldo, Indang, Magallanes, Maragondon, Mendez, Naic, Tagaytay, Ternate
(1)		Jesus Crispin Remulla (born 1961)	June 30, 2019	June 30, 2022	18th	Nacionalista (Magdalo)	Elected in 2019.	2019–present Amadeo, Indang, Tanza, Trece Martires
(1)		Jesus Crispin Remulla (born 1961)	June 30, 2019	June 30, 2022	19th	NUP (Magdalo)	Re-elected in 2022. Resigned on appointment as Secretary of Justice.	2019–present Amadeo, Indang, Tanza, Trece Martires
3		Crispin Diego Remulla (born 1990)	February 28, 2023	Incumbent	19th	NUP	Elected in 2023 to finish his father's term.	2019–present Amadeo, Indang, Tanza, Trece Martires
3		Crispin Diego Remulla (born 1990)	February 28, 2023	Incumbent	20th	NUP	Re-elected in 2025.	2019–present Amadeo, Indang, Tanza, Trece Martires

== Election results ==
=== 2025 ===
2025 Philippine House of Representatives election in Cavite's 7th congressional district
Party	Candidate	Votes	%
NUP	Ping Remulla	190,499	80.88
Independent	Michael Angelo Santos	27,505	11.68
WPP	Wally Abutin	17,531	7.44
Total votes		235,535	100
NUP hold			

=== 2023 special ===
2023 Cavite's 7th congressional district special election
Party	Candidate	Votes	%
NUP	Crispin Diego "Ping" Remulla	98,474	66.68
Independent	Melencio "Jun" De Sagun	46,530	31.51
Independent	Jose Angelito Aguinaldo	1,610	1.09
Independent	Michael Angelo Santos	1,068	0.72
Total votes		147,682	100.00%
NUP hold			

=== 2022 ===
2022 Philippine House of Representatives elections
Party	Candidate	Votes	%
NUP	Jesus Crispin Remulla	202,784	100.00
Total votes		202,784	100%
NUP hold			

=== 2019 ===
2019 Philippine House of Representatives elections
Party	Candidate	Votes	%
Nacionalista	Jesus Crispin Remulla	128,674	67.83%
Aksyon	Hermogenes Arayata III	61,031	32.17%
Total votes		189,705	100%
Nacionalista gain from PDP–Laban			

=== 2016 ===
2016 Philippine House of Representatives elections
Party	Candidate	Votes	%
UNA	Abraham Tolentino	163,514	100%
Total votes		163,514	100%
UNA hold			

=== 2013 ===
2013 Philippine House of Representatives elections
Party	Candidate	Votes	%
Liberal	Abraham Tolentino	91,836	53.72%
Nacionalista	Gilbert Remulla	76,961	45.02%
PMP	Norman Versoza	1,662	0.97%
NPC	Pedro Lopez	507	0.29%
Total votes		170,966	100%
Liberal gain from Nacionalista			

=== 2010 ===
2010 Philippine House of Representatives elections
Party	Candidate	Votes	%
Nacionalista	Jesus Crispin Remulla	119,810	71.20%
Liberal	Laureano Mendoza	48,454	28.80%
Invalid or blank votes		19,233	10.26%
Total votes		187,497	100%
Nacionalista win (new seat)			

== See also ==
- Legislative districts of Cavite
