= Jesus Crispin Remulla =

Filipino politician and lawyer (born 1961)

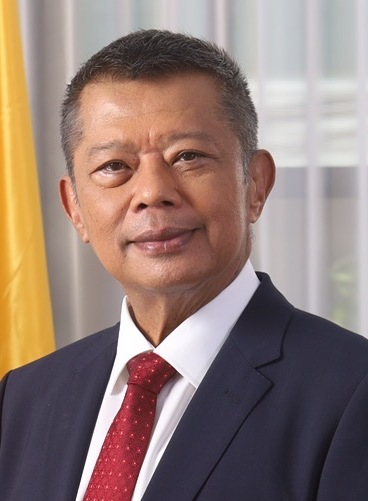
- Official portrait, 2025

7th Ombudsman of the Philippines
- Incumbent
- Assumed office October 9, 2025
- President: Bongbong Marcos
- Preceded by: Samuel Martires

59th Secretary of Justice
- In office June 30, 2022 – October 9, 2025
- President: Bongbong Marcos
- Preceded by: Menardo Guevarra
- Succeeded by: Fredderick Vida (OIC)

Senior Deputy Majority Leader of the Philippine House of Representatives
- In office July 22, 2019 – June 30, 2022
- Leader: Martin Romualdez
- Succeeded by: Sandro Marcos

Deputy House Speaker
- In office July 26, 2010 – June 30, 2013
- House Speaker: Feliciano Belmonte Jr.
- Preceded by: Arnulfo Fuentebella
- Succeeded by: Position reorganized

Member of the Philippine House of Representatives from Cavite
- In office June 30, 2019 – June 30, 2022
- Preceded by: Abraham Tolentino
- Succeeded by: Crispin Diego Remulla
- Constituency: 7th district
- In office June 30, 2010 – June 30, 2013
- Preceded by: District established
- Succeeded by: Abraham Tolentino
- Constituency: 7th district
- In office June 30, 2004 – June 30, 2010
- Preceded by: Napoleon Beratio
- Succeeded by: Erineo Maliksi
- Constituency: 3rd district

36th Governor of Cavite
- In office June 30, 2016 – June 30, 2019
- Vice Governor: Jolo Revilla
- Preceded by: Jonvic Remulla
- Succeeded by: Jonvic Remulla

Member of the Cavite Provincial Board
- In office June 30, 1992 – June 30, 1995

Personal details
- Born: Jesus Crispin Catibayan Remulla; March 31, 1961 (age 65) Manila, Philippines
- Party: NUP (2021–present); Magdalo (local party; 1992–present)
- Other political affiliations: UNA (2014–2016); Nacionalista (2004–2007; 2009–2014, 2016–2021); Lakas–CMD (2007–2009); LDP (until 2004)
- Spouse: Ma. Josefina Diaz
- Children: 5 (including Crispin Diego and Francisco Gabriel)
- Parents: Juanito Remulla Sr.; Ditas Catibayan
- Relatives: Jonvic Remulla (brother); Gilbert Remulla (brother); Dia Maté (granddaughter)
- Education: University of the Philippines Diliman (AB, LL.B.)
- Occupation: Politician; broadcaster
- Profession: Lawyer

Jesus Crispin "Boying" Catibayan Remulla (Tagalog pronunciation: [rɛˈmuljɐ]; born March 31, 1961) is a Filipino politician and lawyer who has served as the seventh ombudsman of the Philippines since 2025.

He previously served as a representative of Cavite from 2004 to 2013 and again from 2019 to 2022. While in Congress, Remulla served as deputy speaker during the 15th Congress (2010–13) and was the senior deputy majority leader in the 18th Congress (2019–22). In the latter role, he was an articulate opponent of ABS-CBN and was among the 70 House members who voted to reject the broadcast network's franchise renewal. He also served as governor of Cavite from 2016 to 2019 and a member of the provincial board from 1992 to 1995.

He is member of the Remulla political dynasty of Cavite. His brother, Jonvic, is also an incumbent Cabinet member as the Secretary of the Interior and Local Government. His father, Juanito, was the provincial governor for fourteen years. His other brother, Gilbert, a former television reporter for ABS-CBN, was the representative of the 2nd district from 2001 to 2007. His son, Crispin Diego, succeeded him in Congress, while his other son, Francisco Gabriel, is the current governor of Cavite.

As a broadcaster, he hosts a radio program titled "Executive Session" on DZRH.

== Education and legal career ==
Remulla completed his primary education at De La Salle University and his secondary education at Ateneo de Manila High School. He obtained his bachelor of arts degree in political science as pre-law from the University of the Philippines Diliman and graduated from the university's College of Law in 1987, where he was a fellow of the Upsilon Sigma Phi fraternity.

Remulla passed the bar exam and the Career Executive Service Board Examination in 1987. He began his law practice as a private practitioner, being a Senior Partner at the Remulla and Associates Law Office.

== Cavite Provincial Board member (1992–1995) ==
Remulla entered politics when he successfully ran for a seat in the Cavite Provincial Board in 1992. He concurrently became a Consultant and Provincial Coordinator for the Metropolitan Manila Development Authority (MMDA) on the Carmona Landfill Project. However, he chose not to seek re-election in 1995 to return to legal practice, thus serving for only one term.

== Estrada administration (1998–2003) ==
Remulla became Assistant Secretary at the Office of the President during the term of President Joseph Estrada from 1998 to 2001.

From 2001 to 2002, he became the chief of staff of Estrada's wife, then Senator and former First Lady Luisa Pimentel-Estrada. He was also the spokesperson of Puwersa ng Masa, and later served as spokesperson of the Pwersa ng Masang Pilipino.

== Representative (2004–2013) ==
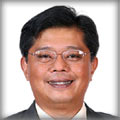
Portrait of Remulla during his term as Cavite representative in the 15th Congress

Remulla subsequently ran for Congress in a controversial 2004 election. During the campaign, he was upset by Cavite Governor Ayong Maliksi, who was a fellow member of Partido Magdalo, because of his support to Silang Mayor Ruben Madlansacay, who ran as independent for congressman. He won as congressman in the district more than two years after the death of Napoleon Beratio.

In 2007, he won for the second term as congressman against then Deputy Presidential Spokesperson Manny De Castro, also from Silang.

In 2009, he among with fellow representatives of Cavite – Jun Abaya and Elpidio Barzaga Jr. – authored the biggest congressional reapportionment in the history of the Philippines by passing Republic Act No. 9727, unofficially titled The Cavite Congressional Reapportionment Act of 2009, bringing the representatives of Cavite from three to seven.

In 2010, he defeated Tagaytay Councilor Laureano Mendoza to claim his third consecutive term and first under the newly created 7th district of Cavite. On July 26, 2010, he became one of six Deputy Speakers of the House of Representatives under the speakership of Feliciano Belmonte Jr.

=== Tagaytay mayoral run (2013) ===
In 2013 elections, he ran for Mayor of Tagaytay under the Nacionalista Party, but lost to Agnes Tolentino of the Liberal Party.

== Governor of Cavite (2016–2019) ==
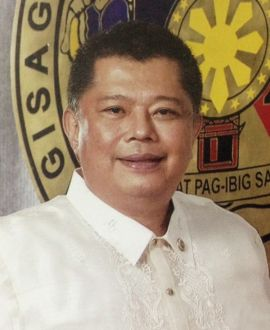
Official portrait of Remulla as the Governor of Cavite.

On December 9, 2015, Remulla filed his candidacy to run as governor of Cavite in 2016, substituting his younger brother Jonvic, who withdrew his re-election bid due to his plan to pursue postgraduate studies. He ran under the local party Magdalo, which coalesced with the United Nationalist Alliance. He successfully won the race.

During his term, the Cavite provincial government achieved ISO 9001:2015 recertification by the SOCOTEC Certification Philippines, Inc. (SCPI) for the Quality Management System covering 29 government offices. In May 2018, he signed an agreement with the Humanitarian Leadership Academy and the Adventist Development and Relief Agency to improve Cavite's readiness for potential earthquakes, particularly along the West Valley fault line in eastern Cavite.

== Representative (2019–2022) ==
Remulla served as governor of Cavite until 2019, when he successfully ran for congressman of the redistricted 7th district.

In 2020, Remulla played a major role in the ABS-CBN franchise renewal controversy along with Rodante Marcoleta and Mike Defensor. They accused ABS-CBN for tax avoidances (by using shell corporations such as Big Dipper), selling Philippine Depositary Receipts (PDRs) for foreigners (which is a possible violation of 1987 Constitution, prohibiting aliens for owning a mass media in the Philippines), using Channel 43 to continue digital broadcasts after the shutdown on May 5, using ABS-CBN facilities, and submitting an alleged tampered Torrens title. He enlisted the help of the National Bureau of Investigation to go after his critics on social media, accusing them of cyberbullying for criticizing him when he disrespected the Philippine national anthem. On July 10, 2020, Remulla, an ex-officio member of the Legislative Franchises, is one of the 70 representatives who voted "yes" to "kill" (deny) the twenty-five year franchise renewal of ABS-CBN, in favor of a report from Technical Working Group. After claiming continuous victory, Remulla joined with Defensor and Marcoleta for an online conversation via Zoom and streamed on Facebook as they discuss their plans to take over the ABS-CBN Broadcasting Center in the future. This forum attracted controversy and their plans to take over the network's compound were slammed by Senate President Tito Sotto and pro-ABS-CBN advocate Christine Bersola-Babao. The former stated that the facilities of the network are constitutionally protected while the latter called the congressmen who initiated the forum as "evil".

Remulla was reelected to the Congress in 2022, unopposed. However, on May 23, 2022, Remulla accepted the offer to become the Secretary of Justice under the incoming administration of president-elect Bongbong Marcos, thus resigning his rights to the seat before his new term began in order to assume the position. He would be succeeded by his son, 7th district Board Member Crispin Diego Remulla, who was elected through a special election in 2023.

== Secretary of Justice (2022–2025) ==
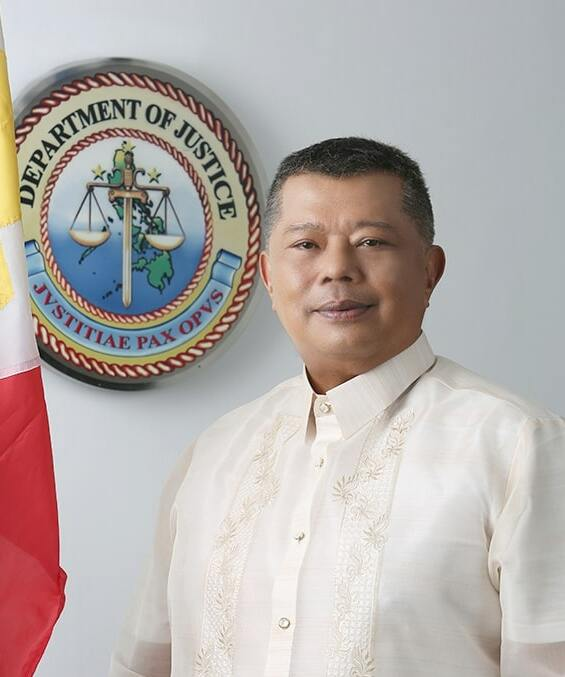
Portrait of Remulla during his term as Secretary of Justice

Remulla took oath as justice secretary on July 1, 2022, before President Bongbong Marcos.

On July 13, 2022, Remulla issued Department Circular No. 027, which creates the Prosecution Integrity Board to look into misconducts of government prosecutors and recommend sanctions against them if necessary, as his first order as Justice Secretary. He also issued a circular that would give himself additional powers over the National Prosecution Service (NPS), a unit under the Department of Justice. On July 28, 2022, he also said that he doesn't think that "we need to spend the next 100 years running after the Marcoses" while discussing the functions of the Presidential Commission on Good Government (PCGG) that went after the ill-gotten wealth of the Marcos family. He added that there is no need to abolish the PCGG.

In November 2022, Remulla rejected the recommendations for the Philippines to adopt SOGIE bill, laws legalizing same-sex marriage, divorce and abortion, and many more citing it "not acceptable in the Philippines, being a pre-dominantly Catholic nation." He added that "they want the SOGIE Bill for same-sex marriage to have the same as in their countries. So, that's not acceptable for us. They really want a lot to be implemented here." The justice department defended Remulla's decision to immediately reject all the recommendations.

According to a report of the Commission on Audit, Remulla is the highest-paid Cabinet member as of 2023, earning a net pay of ₱7.08 million that year.

During his tenure, the department's human rights and gender equality offices were established.

== Ombudsman (2025–present) ==
In July 2025, Remulla filed an application to become the Ombudsman of the Philippines. However, his application was challenged by a pending case on his role on the arrest of Rodrigo Duterte, which would later be dismissed on September 12. This granted him clearance from the Office of the Ombudsman on September 25. On October 7, President Bongbong Marcos appointed Remulla as the 7th Ombudsman, succeeding Samuel Martires, who retired in July. He was sworn in on October 9, prior to which he resigned as Secretary of Justice early the same day.

On October 14, Remulla lifted the restrictions on public access to statements of assets, liabilities, and net worth (SALNs) of government officials imposed by Martires in 2020.

== Controversies ==
=== Alleged payment and red-tagging of Robredo supporters ===
On his radio show Executive Session on DZRH, Remulla questioned the large turnout of individuals during a political rally of presidential aspirant and Vice President Leni Robredo conducted in General Trias, Cavite. He alleged that the supporters of the candidate were paid ₱500 each to join the rally and that some individuals were simply ferried to the venue from other areas of the city to artificially create a large crowd. With uniformed volunteers and possibly local politicians simply leading or paying random passerby to join the rally. The grand rally in question is reported to have been the largest rally of the presidential candidate as of March 6, 2022, with at most 50,000 individuals joining the rally according to a local news report.

Remulla further stated that there were leftist student activists who joined the crowd. He alleged that these students were supposedly trained by the National Democratic Front, a leftist organization with ties to the Communist Party of the Philippines. He also alleged that Robredo had come to an agreement with the communists as well. Remulla was also joined by presidential candidate and provincemate Ping Lacson who, upon reading an article about Remulla's allegations, tweeted a warning about the dangers of a coalition government with the communists.

Robredo has since denied these claims and decried the red-tagging of Remulla's fellow "Caviteños" (term used to describe individuals from the province of Cavite), describing such red-tagging and accusations of vote-buying as an insult to Remulla's provincemates.

Remulla supported presidential candidate Bongbong Marcos in the 2022 presidential election. Together with his brother, then-Cavite governor Jonvic Remulla, Jesus Crispin actively campaigned for Marcos.

== Personal life ==
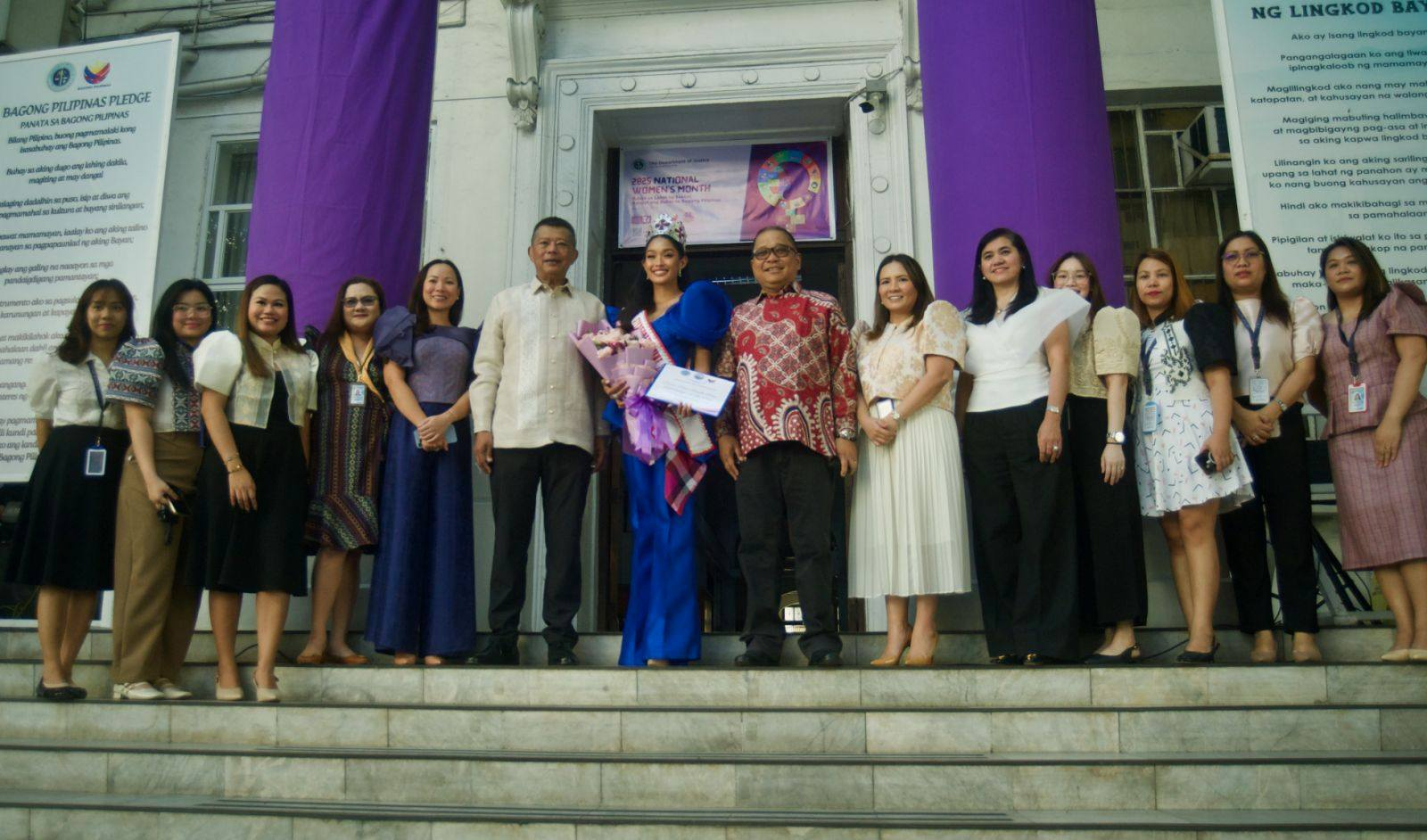
Remulla (sixth from left) and other Department of Justice officials during a courtesy visit by his granddaughter Dia Maté (seventh from left) in 2025

Remulla is a member of the Remulla political dynasty of Cavite: His father, Juanito, was the provincial governor for fourteen years. His brother Gilbert, a former television reporter for ABS-CBN, was the representative of the 2nd district from 2001 to 2007. His other brother, Jonvic, is the current interior secretary.

Remulla is married to Ma. Josefina Diaz. Their children are Lea, Juanito Jose III, Jacinta Maria (Reyna ng Turismo Cavite pageant president), Crispin Diego (also known as Ping), and Francisco Gabriel (also known as Abeng). Three of his children are also in politics: Ping succeeded him in a 2023 special election as representative of Cavite's 7th district serving since 2023, Abeng is the incumbent governor of Cavite since 2025, and Jacinta is the incumbent vice mayor of Naic since 2025. Among Remulla's grandchildren is Dia Maté, Lea's daughter who is a singer and winner of Reina Hispanoamericana 2025.

On October 11, 2022, Juanito Jose Remulla III, then 38, was arrested in Las Piñas for a drug prohibition violation involving ₱1.3 million worth of kush weighing close to 900 grams (32 oz). However, he was later acquitted by Las Piñas Regional Trial Court Branch 197 on January 6, 2023.

=== Health ===
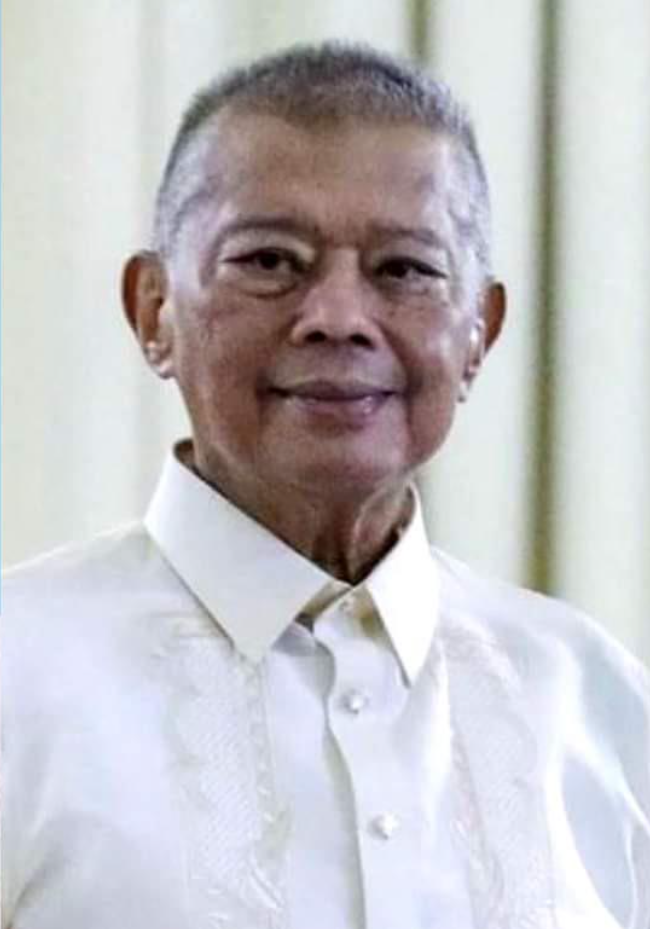
Remulla in March 2024, during his first appearance since his four-month absence due to home care recovery

In a press conference on February 26, 2024, Remulla admitted that complication affected his immune system due to his June 27, 2023 coronary artery bypass surgery of his 5 arteries. On May 30, 2024, Asec. Jose Dominic Clavano IV, the DOJ spokesperson, told reporters in a Zoom interview that Remulla was at home care recovery, citing that his immune system remains weak due to medications. Following a four-month absence since March 4, 2024, Remulla made his first public appearance during the signing of the DOJ–National Prosecution Service’s Revised Rules on Criminal Procedure on July 10. In an interview with Luchi Cruz-Valdes on October 24, 2025, Remulla later revealed that he was diagnosed with leukemia following the surgery and later recovered after receiving chemotherapy and a bone marrow transplant, with his son serving as the donor.

House of Representatives of the Philippines
Preceded by Napoleon Beratio	Representative, 3rd District of Cavite; 2004–2010	Succeeded by Erineo Maliksi
New district	Representative, 7th District of Cavite; 2010–2013	Succeeded by Abraham Tolentino
Preceded by Arnulfo Fuentebella	Deputy House Speaker for Luzon; 2010–2013	Reorganized
Preceded by Abraham Tolentino	Representative, 7th District of Cavite; 2019–2022	Succeeded by Crispin Diego Remulla
Political offices
Preceded by Jonvic Remulla	Governor of Cavite; 2016–2019	Succeeded by Jonvic Remulla
Preceded by Menardo Guevarra	Secretary of Justice; 2022–2025	Succeeded by Fredderick Vida (OIC)
Government offices
Preceded by Samuel Martires	Ombudsman of the Philippines; 2025–present	Incumbent
