= Nardong Putik =

Filipino criminal (1925–1971)

Leonardo Manicio
- Born: March 25, 1923; Dasmariñas, Cavite, Insular Government of the Philippine Islands, U.S.
- Died: October 10, 1971 (aged 48); Kawit, Cavite, Philippines
- Other names: Nardong Putik; Kilabot
- Spouse: Feliciana Nolasco
- Children: 5
- Convictions: Murder, kidnapping, illegal possession of firearms, protection, murder-for-hire
- Penalty: 182 years and 2 months

Leonardo Malihan Manicio (March 25, 1923 – October 10, 1971), better known through his alias Nardong Putik ("Nardo of the Mud"), was a Filipino gangster who mainly operated in the province of Cavite. He famously credited his ability to survive and escape numerous ambushes and gunfights to his anting-anting (amulet).

== Background ==
Manicio was born on March 25, 1923, in Sabang, Dasmariñas, Cavite. When Leonardo was baptized as an infant, he had Jose Barzaga as godfather, belonging to a wealthy clan whose scions were prominent lawyers, land owners and politicians in the town. His father Juan Manicio was a farmer and politician of some consequence in his town and enjoyed a long time affiliation with the prominent Carungcong, Mangubat and Barzaga families.

Due to his father's alliance with the Barzagas, his father Juan Manicio became a target, and was murdered and robbed of his livestock and water bufffalo in their home in 1944 by political rivals who belonged to an armed guerilla group under Col. Emiliano De La Cruz from Barrio Paliparan, Dasmariñas (14th Infantry Unit). De La Cruz had been vying for control over turf in Dasmariñas with a powerful rival and heavily armed guerilla group under Col. Estanislao Mangubat Carungcong (4th Infantry Regiment), and in these circumstances, Manicio sought revenge for the injustices his family had suffered.

As a result, Manicio was drawn into factional politics in Dasmariñas, and was soon appointed as a police officer by Mayor Felicisimo Carungcong in 1944. He then enlisted as a fully armed retainer of the powerful clique of families in Dasmariñas (the Carungcong-Mangubat-Barzagas). With his new capacity, one by one, his fathers murderers were brought to justice. Manicio was married to Feliciana but had many common-law wives. He had one known son, Leonardo Jr., and two known daughters, Angelita and Estrellita with his legal wife.

== Criminal career ==
Philippine Constabulary files show Manicio was involved in various criminal cases which ranged from illegal possession of firearms to kidnapping, armed robbery and murder starting from 1948. Among the major cases in which Manicio was involved in were the infamous Maragondon Massacre in 1952 where the mayor, police chief, and several policemen were killed with hunting knives, and the 1957 Election Day killing of Lt. Colonel Laureano Maraña, then provincial commander of Cavite, and seven others. Cavite politicians were also found to have been in league with the Manicio, utilizing him in their struggle for political supremacy. Manicio led a group of roving bandits engaged in kidnapping, robbery, car theft, murder, marijuana growing, protection, and murder-for-hire as a gunman for Cavite's politicians.

Later on, Manicio affiliated himself with the father and son tandem of Liberal Senator Justiniano and Governor Delfin Montano of Amaya, Tanza Cavite and lastly with President Ferdinand Marcos, Governor Lino Bocalan and Vice Governor Dominador Camerino. According to Caviteños, Manicio got that name as he was known to submerge himself in mud paddies, among carabaos, using bamboo or papaya stalks as breathing tubes, whenever he had to evade a police or military dragnet.

=== First capture ===
Manicio was first convicted and jailed in 1953 but escaped in July 1955 from the Constabulary stockade in Imus, Cavite where he was held as a detention prisoner and were reporting to then Governor Dominador I Mangubat. On Election Day of 1957, an encounter occurred between his group and the group led by then Cavite Philippine Constabulary (PC) commander Lt. Col. Laureano Marana, wherein Marana and his men were killed.

=== Second capture ===
Manicio was re-captured on May 27, 1958, after he was cornered in a rice mill in barrio Medicion in Imus, Cavite, by Lt. Elias R. Lazo, Jr. of the 31st PC Company and Lt. Federico D. Navarro of the 117th PC Company who were both promoted to captain and decorated the Gold Cross Medal, the third highest military battle award, for their daring capture. Manicio surrendered to Lt. Lazo after engaging the patrol in a 45-minute gun battle. Manicio credited his survival to his anting-anting. Manicio was sentenced to jail for 182 years and two months at the national penitentiary in Muntinlupa, but was granted freedom of movement. He escaped in October 1969 and took refuge from his home town who he still had close ties with his longtime mentor Dasmarinas Mayor Remigio Carungcong.

=== Massacre of NBI agents ===
In the morning of February 10, 1971, two agents of the Narcotics Division of the National Bureau of Investigation (NBI), Rogelio Domingo and Antonio Dayao, were killed by Putik and his men. Victims belonged to a group headed by Supervising Agent Eligio Songco, that went to Imus, Cavite to survey and raid a marijuana plantation allegedly being protected by Putik. Some of his men involved were later apprehended, charged and convicted in court in connection to the killings.

=== Death ===
A joint NBI-Constabulary force was assembled with the intention to capture Manicio, dead or alive, who by then had a PHP20,000 bounty on his head by the new acting governor, Johnny Remulla. Reportedly, Lt. Col. Miguel Gantuangco, one of the task forces' commanding officers with NBI agent Epimaco Velasco, attempted to coax Manicio into surrendering via Bishop Vicedo of Caloocan, but the attempts proved fruitless. On October 9–10, 1971, the task force attempted to follow him, discovering his hideout by the 10th. Ambushes were prepared by the Constabulary in the general area in the early morning hours along the possible routes he would take. On October 10, 1971, Manicio's red Chevrolet Impala came upon a task force highway checkpoint between Panamitan and Kawit. Manicio refused to obey the signals for him to stop, and the 20 assembled agents and police officers opened fire, killing him almost instantly. On his person was a revolver, 300 pesos, $150 in counterfeit bills, a wallet, a notebook with information regarding his debts, and several false identity papers.

The operation later boosted the careers of Remulla and Velasco. As the Montanos were on self exile to America, Lino Bocalan in jail, the death of Camerino and the death of the "Kilabot" Nardong Putik, the former would later become a Constitutional Delegate; Velasco the head of the NBI, later DILG secretary and Cavite governor, and so it was to Johnny Remulla who had now a clear path to become new Cavite Governor.

On Manicio's death, some of his men were later arrested, charged, and convicted in court for murder and other offenses. The killing was also met with mixed reactions in Cavite as he had built a reputation as a local "Robin Hood" given that his criminal exploits mainly targeted the rich.

==== Alternate theories regarding his death ====
An alternate theory regarding Manicio's death later surfaced, supported by some of Manicio's friends, an acquaintance in the press, and a former police chief. This version claimed that Manicio was lured to a resort, drugged, and placed in the Impala, whereupon his pursuers opened fire at the car to give the illusion he had been gunned down while resisting arrest.

Another legend of his true demise, according to Caviteño legends, was that Nardo was invited by Vicente Casilagan, his 'kumpare', into a social gathering that was sponsored and paid generously by a Cavite political leader. When Putik appeared to be tipsy (a condition which is prohibited for an individual who possesses an amulet due to its ability to lose its effect when the holder is intoxicated by alcohol), he was then hit on the back of his head by his turncoat friend and died from the injury. His body was surrendered to the NBI and PC for the aforementioned staging of his "death".

== In popular culture ==
Two versions of Nardong Putik (Kilabot ng Cavite) were made in 1972 and in 1984, wherein in both films, Manicio was portrayed by action star and then-future politician Ramon Revilla, Sr., a fellow Caviteño. Both were a success at the local box office, and Revilla later played a double role as Manicio and his supposed rival and fellow Cavite-based career criminal, Captain Eddie Set in 1974's Kapitan Eddie Set: Mad Killer of Cavite. He was portrayed by Roy Alvarez in Epimaco Velasco: NBI with Fernando Poe, Jr. as Velasco. He was also portrayed by Rez Cortez in Mariano Mison: NBI, but his car changed from red into blue.

The films capitalized on the supposed incredible magic of Manicio's anting-anting. Both were loosely based on his life while portrayed him as an anti-hero.

== See also ==
- Anting-anting
- Philippine Constabulary

== Sources ==
- The Manila Bulletin, "Scribe Who Negotiated Years Ago Putik Surrender Sees His Capture" by Amelita Reysio-Cruz, May 27, 1958
- The Cavite Independent News, May 28, 1958
- Philippine Constabulary Yearbook August 1960
- IMDB Information for the movie "Nardong Putik".
