= Dominador Mangubat =

Filipino doctor and statesman

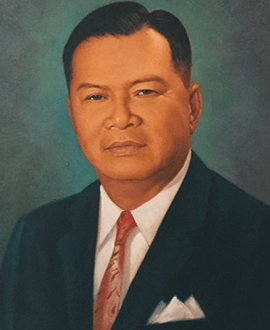

Governor of Cavite
- Acting
- In office May 1954 – December 31, 1955
- Preceded by: Horacio Rodriguez
- Succeeded by: Delfin Montano

Personal details
- Born: Dominador Ilano Mangubat; August 24, 1903 Dasmariñas, Cavite, Philippine Islands
- Died: November 19, 1980 (aged 77)
- Spouse: Avelina G. Martinez
- Relations: Rex Mangubat (grandson)
- Children: 2
- Education: University of Santo Tomas
- Occupation: Doctor
- Military career
- Allegiance: Philippines
- Service years: 1942–1945
- Rank: Major
- Unit: 4th Infantry Regiment Fil-American Cavite Guerilla Forces
- Conflicts: World War II

Dominador Ilano Mangubat (June 24, 1903 – November 19, 1980) is a Filipino medical doctor and statesman who served as appointed provincial governor of Cavite during the Third Republic of the Philippines. He served from May 1954 to December 31, 1955. After the national election of 1953, President Ramon Magsaysay installed Mangubat mayor of Cavite City and later appointed as governor in May 1954.

Mangubat never ran for political office, a businessman and a physician by profession his accession into politics were partly due to his popularity among the Caviteño as a doctor apart from being descended to a Spanish Era Prominent clan of Cavite Mangubat's capacity prompted President Magsaysay to install Mangubat mayor of Cavite City and then as Provincial Governor of Cavite, serving the unexpired term of Governor Camerino, who had a case before the court.

During his governorship, Trece Martires became a city after it was carved out of Tanza. Under the city charter, the Governor of Cavite was the ex-officio mayor of Trece Martires; then-Governor Dominador Mangubat, who was installed as the city's first chief executive.

== Early life and education ==
Dominador Mangubat was born to Municipal President (Mayor) Isidro S. Mangubat and Damasa Ilano, on June 24, 1903 in Dasmariñas. He was the eldest son of the couple and a descendant of Spanish era Dasmariñas Gobernadorcillo Leon Garcia Mangubat

The Mangubat family of Cavite owned the Maritime transport vessel "El Vapor Mactan" a cargo ship based in Cavite used to transport military hardware and soldiers from the Cavite Arsenal to the military fort in Zamboanga, and Jolo since the foundation of Fort Pilar in 1635. During the US regime the Mangubat family maritime transport business was converted into a fishing fleet.

Mangubat completed his elementary level studies in Imus, Cavite and attended the high school of the University of the Philippines in Manila for his secondary studies. Mangubat then attended the University of Santo Tomas where he finished his pre-medical course with the degree of Associate in Arts.He completed his medical studies at the College of Medicine of the same university where he graduated in 1930. He passed the examination by the Board of Medical Examiners on the same year.

== Career ==
The Cavite Medical Society had Mangubat as one of its organizers. Mangubat was elected as vice president of the medical organization during its first meeting. During World War II, when the Japanese occupied the Philippines, he joined the resistance movement as an executive officer with the rank of Major and serve as the head of the Medical Corps to the 4th Infantry Regiment headed by his close kin Col. Estanislao Mangubat-Carungcong of the Fil-American Cavite Guerilla Forces (FACGF) with General Mariano Castañeda as Division Commander.

On July 25, 1943 he was arrested by the Kempeitai (Japanese Military Police) along with Lt. Col Jose M. Carungcong, Capt. Elpidio Mangubat-Barzaga Sr. and Capt. Jovito Evangelista and became a prisoner of war by the Japanese for 2 months after that he was release from Muntinglupa Rizal prison camp. Dr. Mangubat went back to his ranch in Dasmariñas, where he continued to provide food and medicine as supplies, storing firearms for the guerrillas and treating wounded troops. He went on aiding the guerrillas until the arrival of the American forces in January 1945 and this provided the vital tactical advantage to the 4th Infantry Regiment FACGF in liberating the town of Dasmariñas and the province of Cavite from the Japanese occupiers.

After the war in 1956, Dr. Mangubat was elected as treasurer of the Federation of the Filipino Rice and Corn Millers Association of the Philippines. In 1959, Dr. Mangubat was elected as president of the organization. In 1963 he was appointed director of the Rice and Corn Board, serving in this capacity until 1972. He died on November 19, 1980.

== Personal life ==
Mangubat was married to Avelina G. Martinez, who was a pharmacist working in Malabon, Rizal (now part of Metro Manila). Dominador had two sons with Avelina. Their son Dominador Jr. went on to become a doctor of medicine like his father, and Renato, who became the manager of the Prudential Bank. Dominador Jr.'s son Rex is a politician from Dasmariñas who last served as the city's vice mayor.
