= Governor of Cavite =

Local chief executive

- Seal of the Province of Cavite

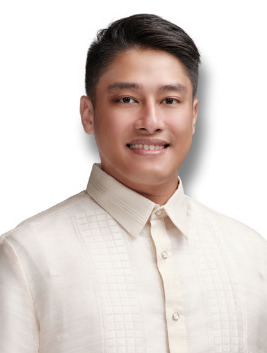
- Incumbent; Abeng Remulla since June 30, 2025
- Style: The Honorable
- Seat: Cavite Provincial Capitol
- Term length: 3 years, not eligible for re-election immediately after three consecutive terms
- Inaugural holder: Mariano Trias
- Formation: 1614 (as politico-military governor)
- Website: https://cavite.gov.ph/

The governor of Cavite is the local chief executive of the Province of Cavite in the Philippines.

== History ==
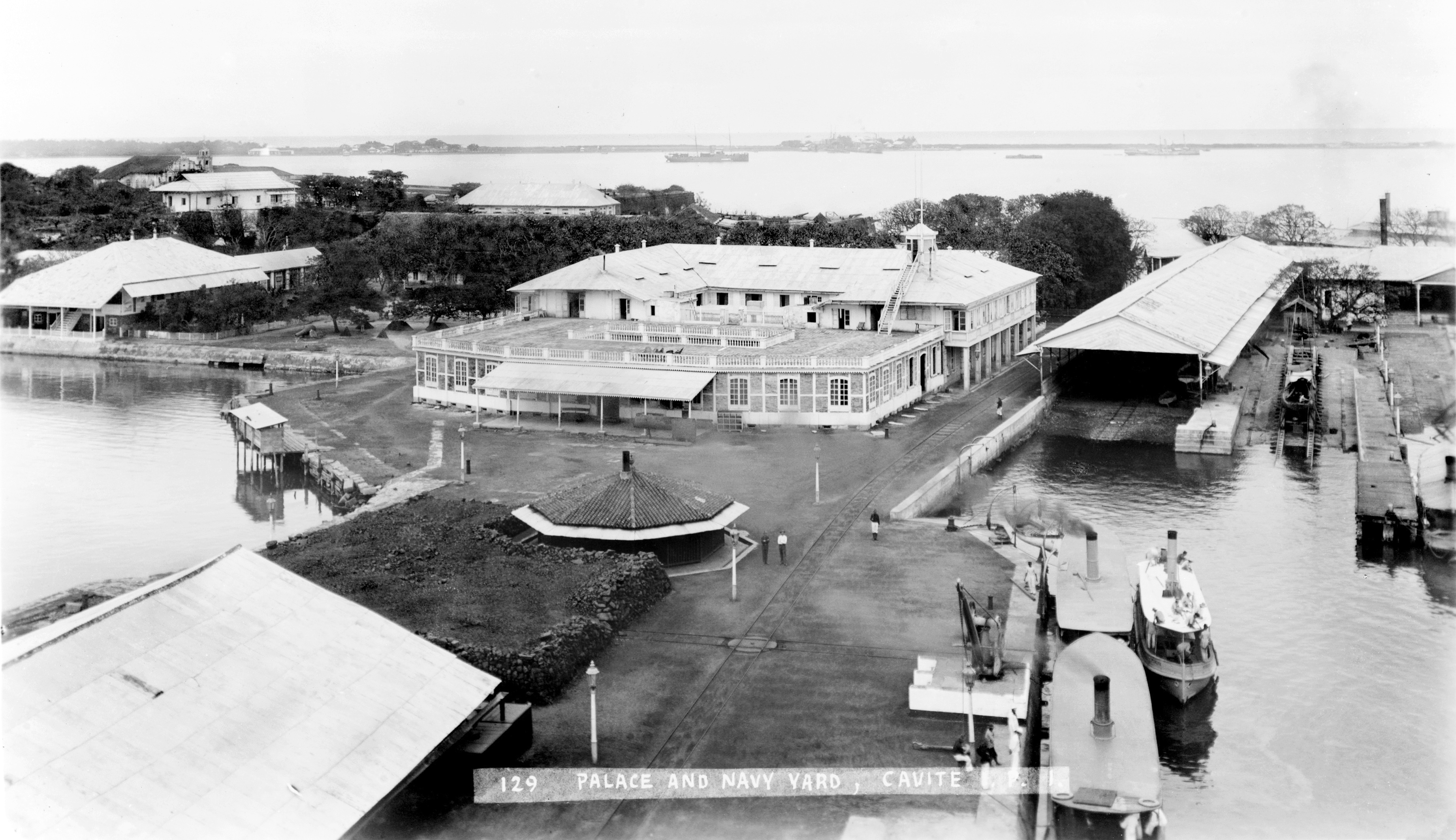
The former Governor's Palace in the walled Cavite Nuevo (present-day Cavite City).

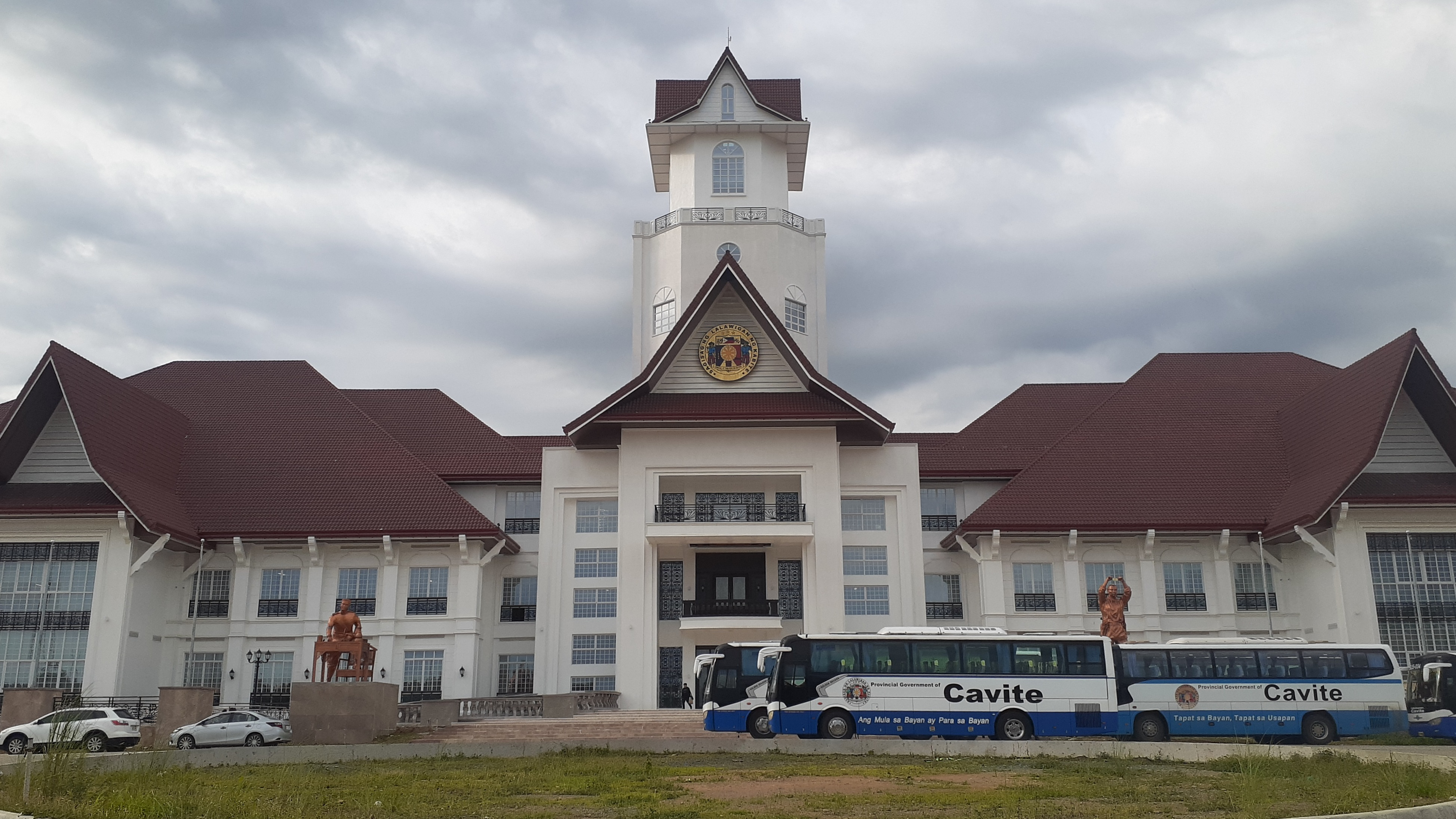
New Cavite Provincial Capitol in Trece Martires where the governor's office is located

During most part of the Spanish colonial era, Cavite was administered by the alcalde mayor, who was the representative of the governor and captain-general in Manila. As the alter ego of the Governor-General, the alcalde mayor exercised over all executive, judicial, and legislative functions of Cavite. By the Decree dated June 25, 1847, the title of alcalde mayor was changed to politico-military governor. This time, judicial functions were stripped off from the chief executive. Col. Fernando Pargas was the last Spanish politico-military governor of Cavite before three Filipino politico-military governors assumed the position during the First Philippine Republic.

== List of governors of Cavite ==
The following is the list of governors of Cavite from the Revolutionary Government in 1898 to the present Republic of the Philippines:

Governors of the Province of Cavite
| Governor | Term in office | Party | Election | Vice Governor | Era |
|---|---|---|---|---|---|
| Mariano Trías (1869–1914) | July 15 – August 10, 1898 | Politico-military governor appointed by President Emilio Aguinaldo | | None | Revolutionary Government |
| Emiliano Riego de Dios (1864–1926) | August 10 – October 7, 1898 | Politico-military governor appointed by President Emilio Aguinaldo | | None | Revolutionary Government |
| Ladislao Diwa (1863–1930) | October 7, 1898 – May 13, 1901 | Politico-military governor appointed by President Emilio Aguinaldo | | None | Revolutionary Government |
| Ladislao Diwa (1863–1930) | October 7, 1898 – May 13, 1901 | Politico-military governor appointed by President Emilio Aguinaldo | | None | First Republic |
| Mariano Trías (1869–1914) | June 11, 1901 – 1903 (resigned) | Civil governor appointed by Governor-General William Howard Taft | | None | U.S. Insular Government |
| David C. Shanks (1861–1940) | July 8, 1903 – September 30, 1905 (relieved) | Civil governor appointed by Governor-General William Howard Taft | | None | U.S. Insular Government |
| Louis J. Van Schaick (1875–1945) | October 12, 1905 – 1907 | Civil governor appointed by Governor-General Luke Edward Wright | | None | U.S. Insular Government |
| Leonardo Osorio (1873–1929) | 1908–1909 | Unknown | 1907 | None | U.S. Insular Government |
| Tomás Mascardo (1871–1932) | 1910–1912 | Unknown | 1909 | None | U.S. Insular Government |
| Antero Soriano (1886–1929) | 1912–1919 | Nacionalista | 1912 | None | U.S. Insular Government |
| Antero Soriano (1886–1929) | 1912–1919 | Nacionalista | 1916 | None | U.S. Insular Government |
| Luis Ferrer Sr. (1872–1942) | 1919–1921 | Unknown | 1919 | None | U.S. Insular Government |
| Raymundo Jeciel (1875–1951) | 1922–1925 | Unknown | 1922 | None | U.S. Insular Government |
| Fabian Pugeda (1886–1969) | 1925–1931 | Nacionalista | 1925 | None | U.S. Insular Government |
| Fabian Pugeda (1886–1969) | 1925–1931 | Nacionalista | 1928 | None | U.S. Insular Government |
| Pedro Espiritu (1887–1935) | 1931–1935 (died in office) | Democrata | 1931 | None | U.S. Insular Government |
| Ramon Samonte (1889–1962) | 1935–1939 | Nacionalista | Appointed acting governor | None | Commonwealth |
| Ramon Samonte (1889–1962) | 1935–1939 | Nacionalista | 1935 | None | Commonwealth |
| Emilio P. Virata | 1939 | Nacionalista | Acting | None | Commonwealth |
| Luis Ferrer Jr. | 1940–1944 | Nacionalista (until 1943) | Unknown | None | Commonwealth |
| Luis Ferrer Jr. | 1940–1944 | KALIBAPI (from 1943) | Unknown | None | Second Republic |
| Mariano Castañeda (1892–1970) | 1944 | Military governor appointed by the Second Philippine Republic | | None | Second Republic |
| Dominador Camerino (1899–1979) | December 1944 – February 3, 1945 | Provincial board member succeeded as governor (Note: Camerino served as governor after Mariano Castañeda fled to the hills to lead anti-Japanese resistance in the province.) | | None | Second Republic |
| Mariano Castañeda (1892–1970) | February 3, 1945 – 1945 | Military governor | | None | Second Republic |
| Francisco Arca (1898–1974) | 1945–1946 | Nacionalista | — | None | Commonwealth |
| Dominador Camerino (1899–1979) | 1946–April 20, 1954 (suspended) | Liberal | Appointed by President Manuel Roxas | None | Third Republic |
| Dominador Camerino (1899–1979) | 1946–April 20, 1954 (suspended) | Liberal | 1947 | None | Third Republic |
| Dominador Camerino (1899–1979) | 1946–April 20, 1954 (suspended) | Liberal | 1951 | None | Third Republic |
| Mariano Villanueva | 1954 | Unknown | Acting | None | Third Republic |
| Horacio Rodriguez | 1954 | Unknown | Acting | None | Third Republic |
| Dominador Mangubat (1903–1980) | May 4, 1954 – December 31, 1955 | Unknown | Appointed by President Ramon Magsaysay | None | Third Republic |
| Delfin Montano (1927–1991) | December 31, 1955 – December 30, 1971 | Liberal | 1955 | Unknown | Third Republic |
| Delfin Montano (1927–1991) | December 31, 1955 – December 30, 1971 | Liberal | 1959 | Unknown | Third Republic |
| Delfin Montano (1927–1991) | December 31, 1955 – December 30, 1971 | Liberal | 1963 | Unknown | Third Republic |
| Delfin Montano (1927–1991) | December 31, 1955 – December 30, 1971 | Liberal | 1967 | Unknown | Third Republic |
| Lino Bocalan (1928–2000) | December 30, 1971 – September 24, 1972 (arrested and removed) | Nacionalista | 1971 | Dominador Camerino | Third Republic |
| Dominador Camerino (1899–1979) | October 1, 1972 – July 24, 1979 (died in office) | Nacionalista | Succeeded from vice governor | Johnny Remulla | Martial law |
| Johnny Remulla (1933–2014) | September 25, 1979 – January 30, 1980 | KBL | Acting governor appointed by President Ferdinand Marcos | None | Martial law |
| Johnny Remulla (1933–2014) | January 30, 1980 – February 19, 1986 (resigned) | KBL | 1980 | Unknown | Martial law |
| Johnny Remulla (1933–2014) | January 30, 1980 – February 19, 1986 (resigned) | KBL | 1980 | Unknown | Fourth Republic |
| Fernando Campos | February 19, 1986 – February 2, 1988 | Nacionalista | Appointed by President Corazon Aquino | None | Fourth Republic |
| Fernando Campos | February 19, 1986 – February 2, 1988 | Nacionalista | Appointed by President Corazon Aquino | None | Fifth Republic |
| Johnny Remulla (1933–2014) | February 2, 1988 – June 30, 1995 | Magdalo (local) | 1988 | Luis Ferrer III | Fifth Republic |
| Johnny Remulla (1933–2014) | February 2, 1988 – June 30, 1995 | NPC (from 1992) | 1992 | Danilo Lara | Fifth Republic |
| Epimaco Velasco (1935–2014) | June 30, 1995 – February 4, 1998 (resigned) (Note: Velasco resigned, having been appointed Secretary of the Interior and Local Government.) | Lakas | 1995 | Bong Revilla | Fifth Republic |
| Bong Revilla (born 1966) | February 6, 1998 – June 30, 2001 | Lakas | Succeeded from vice governor | Jonvic Remulla | Fifth Republic |
| Ayong Maliksi (1938–2021) | June 30, 2001 – June 30, 2010 | LDP (until 2007) | 2001 | Jonvic Remulla | Fifth Republic |
| Ayong Maliksi (1938–2021) | June 30, 2001 – June 30, 2010 | LDP (until 2007) | 2004 | Jonvic Remulla | Fifth Republic |
| Ayong Maliksi (1938–2021) | June 30, 2001 – June 30, 2010 | Liberal (from 2007) | 2007 | Dencito Campaña | Fifth Republic |
| Jonvic Remulla (born 1967) | June 30, 2010 – June 30, 2016 | Nacionalista (until 2012) | 2010 | Recto Cantimbuhan | Fifth Republic |
| Jonvic Remulla (born 1967) | June 30, 2010 – June 30, 2016 | Lakas (2012–2014) | 2010 | Recto Cantimbuhan | Fifth Republic |
| Jonvic Remulla (born 1967) | June 30, 2010 – June 30, 2016 | Lakas (2012–2014) | 2013 | Jolo Revilla | Fifth Republic |
| Jonvic Remulla (born 1967) | June 30, 2010 – June 30, 2016 | UNA (from 2014) | 2013 | Jolo Revilla | Fifth Republic |
| Jesus Crispin Remulla (born 1961) | June 30, 2016 – June 30, 2019 | Nacionalista | 2016 | Jolo Revilla | Fifth Republic |
| Jonvic Remulla (born 1967) | June 30, 2019 – October 8, 2024 (resigned) (Note: Remulla resigned, having been appointed Secretary of the Interior and Local Government.) | Nacionalista (until 2021) | 2019 | Jolo Revilla | Fifth Republic |
| Jonvic Remulla (born 1967) | June 30, 2019 – October 8, 2024 (resigned) | NUP (from 2021) | 2019 | Jolo Revilla | Fifth Republic |
| Jonvic Remulla (born 1967) | June 30, 2019 – October 8, 2024 (resigned) | NUP (from 2021) | 2022 | Athena Tolentino | Fifth Republic |
| Athena Tolentino (born 1998) | October 8, 2024 – June 30, 2025 | NUP | Succeeded from vice governor | Shernan Jaro | Fifth Republic |
| Abeng Remulla (born 1993) | June 30, 2025 – Incumbent | NUP | 2025 | Ram Revilla Bautista | Fifth Republic |

== Elections ==
- 1988 Cavite local elections
- 1992 Cavite local elections
- 1995 Cavite local elections
- 1998 Cavite local elections
- 2001 Cavite local elections
- 2004 Cavite local elections
- 2007 Cavite local elections
- 2010 Cavite local elections
- 2013 Cavite local elections
- 2016 Cavite local elections
- 2019 Cavite local elections
- 2022 Cavite local elections
- 2025 Cavite local elections
