= 2013 Cavite local elections =

Philippine election

2013 Cavite gubernatorial election
- May 13, 2013
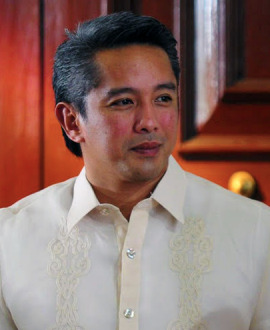

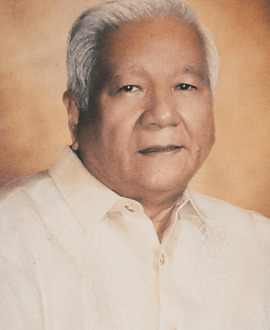
Nominee	Jonvic Remulla	Erineo Maliksi
Party	Lakas	Liberal
Running mate	Jolo Revilla	Ronald Jay Lacson
Popular vote	458,434	402,146
Percentage	53.27	46.73
Governor before election
Jonvic Remulla
Lakas
Elected Governor
Jonvic Remulla
Lakas

Local elections were held in the province of Cavite on May 13, 2013 within the Philippine general election. Voters selected candidates for all local positions: a mayor, vice mayor, councilors, members of the Sangguniang Panlalawigan, the vice-governor, governor and representatives for the seven districts of Cavite.

Incumbent Jonvic Remulla of the Nacionalista Party, Lakas–CMD and the local party Partido Magdalo ran for a second term and defeated 3rd District Representative Ayong Maliksi, his gubernatorial predecessor.

Remulla and Maliksi's running mates are both sons of incumbent senators. Remulla ran with actor and Liga ng mga Barangay (League of Barangays) Provincial Chapter President Jolo Revilla of Lakas–CMD, son of senator Bong Revilla, while Ronald Jay Lacson, son of outgoing senator Panfilo Lacson, ran with Maliksi. Revilla went on to defeat Lacson by a comfortable margin.

== Opinion polling ==
=== Gubernatorial election ===
Poll source	Date(s) conducted	Sample size	Margin of error	Maliksi	Remulla
StratPOLLS	—	—	—	57.9%	42.2%
StratPOLLS	April 13–17	1,000	±3.5%	54.9%	44.7%
StratPOLLS	March 15–19	1,000	±3.5%	57.2%	42.7%

According to a survey conducted on 1,300 respondents by the Laylo Research Strategies (LRS) on April 14–21, Remulla led Maliksi by 14% or about 148,000 votes. The exact percentage of the respondents who will vote for the candidates was not shown.

=== Vice gubernatorial election ===
Poll source	Date(s) conducted	Sample size	Margin of error	Cantimbuhan	Lacson	Revilla
StratPOLLS	March 15–19	1,000	±3.5%	—	38.2%	52.1%

== Provincial elections ==
The candidates for governor and vice governor with the highest number of votes wins the seat; they are voted separately, therefore, they may be of different parties when elected.

=== Gubernatorial election ===
Parties are as stated in their certificate of candidacies.

Jonvic Remulla is the incumbent. Although he ran under the Alyansang Lakas at Magdalo (Alliance of Lakas and Magdalo), which was dominated by Lakas–CMD candidates, he was still a member of the Nacionalista Party, which was affiliated with the Liberal coalition to which Maliksi belonged.

Cavite gubernatorial election
Party	Candidate	Votes	%
Lakas	Jonvic Remulla	458,434	53.27
Liberal	Erineo Maliksi	402,146	46.73
Total votes		860,580	100.00
Lakas hold			

=== Vice-gubernatorial election ===
Parties are as stated in their certificate of candidacies.

Incumbent Recto Cantimbuhan, who was replaced as the Liberal Party's candidate by Lacson, ran as Independent.

Cavite Vice-Gubernatorial election
Party	Candidate	Votes	%
Lakas	Jolo Revilla	449,849	54.67
Liberal	Ronald Jay Lacson	263,511	32.03
Independent	Recto Cantimbuhan	109,418	13.30
Total votes		822,738	100.00
Lakas gain from Independent			

== Congressional elections ==
Each of Cavite's seven legislative districts elected a representative to the House of Representatives.

=== 1st District ===
The seat was vacated when Jun Abaya was appointed as DOTC Secretary. His brother Francis Gerald Abaya is his party's nominee for the seat. He ran against former Kawit Mayor Federico "Hit" Poblete of the Nacionalista Party. Director Joel Lamangan, who was going to run under the local party Partido Magdalo, withdrew his candidacy.

Philippine House of Representatives election at Cavite's 1st district
Party	Candidate	Votes	%
Liberal	Francis Gerald Abaya	100,041	77.06
Nacionalista	Federico Poblete	29,778	22.94
Total votes		129,819	100.00
Liberal hold			

=== 2nd District (Bacoor) ===
Lani Mercado-Revilla is the incumbent. She faced off against former Bacoor Mayor Jessie Castillo.

Philippine House of Representatives election at Cavite's 2nd district
Party	Candidate	Votes	%
Lakas	Lani Mercado-Revilla	109,203	72.11
Liberal	Jessie Castillo	40,439	26.70
NUP	Gerbie Ber Ado	1,796	1.19
Total votes		151,438	100.00
Lakas hold			

=== 3rd District (Imus City) ===
Incumbent Ayong Maliksi ran for Governor. Former Board Member Alex Advincula is his party's nominee for the seat.

Philippine House of Representatives election at Cavite's 3rd district
Party	Candidate	Votes	%
Liberal	Alex Advincula	63,123	65.90
Lakas	Albert Villaseca	31,854	33.26
Nacionalista	Eleazar Salon	809	0.84
Total votes		95,786	100.00
Liberal hold			

=== 4th District (Dasmariñas) ===
Elpidio Barzaga Jr. is the incumbent and was also nominated by the Liberal Party.

Philippine House of Representatives election at Cavite's 4th district
Party	Candidate	Votes	%
NUP	Elpidio Barzaga Jr.	165,604	87.42
Lakas	Miguel Ilano	23,836	12.58
Total votes		189,440	100.00
NUP hold			

=== 5th District ===
Roy Loyola is the incumbent and ran unopposed. His supposed opponent Silang Mayor Clarito "Areng" Poblete (Lakas) did not run.

Philippine House of Representatives election at Cavite's 5th district
Party	Candidate	Votes	%
Liberal	Roy Loyola	133,943	100.00
Total votes		133,943	100.00
Liberal hold			

=== 6th District ===
Incumbent Antonio Ferrer ran for Mayor of General Trias; his brother, incumbent General Trias mayor Luis Ferrer IV is the party's nominee for the seat, he is also nominated by their old party, Lakas–CMD. He squared off against former vice governor Dencito Campaña.

Philippine House of Representatives election at Cavite's 6th district
Party	Candidate	Votes	%
NUP	Luis Ferrer IV	125,611	67.67
Liberal	Dencito Campaña	60,024	32.33
Total votes		185,635	100.00
NUP hold			

=== 7th District ===
Jesus Crispin Remulla is in his third consecutive term and is ineligible to run; his brother, former representative Gilbert Remulla is his party's nominee for the seat, and also nominated by Lakas. Remulla squared off against Tagaytay mayor Abraham Tolentino.

Philippine House of Representatives election at Cavite's 7th district
Party	Candidate	Votes	%
Liberal	Abraham Tolentino	101,075	53.53
Nacionalista	Gilbert Remulla	85,203	45.13
PMP	Norman Versoza	1,971	1.04
NPC	Pedro Lopez	555	0.29
Total votes		188,804	100.00
Liberal gain from Nacionalista			

== Provincial Board elections ==
All 7 Districts of Cavite elected Sangguniang Panlalawigan or provincial board members. The first two candidates who obtained the highest number of votes were elected. Names in italics denote the incumbents.

=== 1st District ===
- City: Cavite City
- Municipality: Kawit, Noveleta, Rosario

Parties are as stated in their certificate of candidacies.

Cavite 1st District Sangguniang Panlalawigan election
Party	Candidate	Votes	%
Lakas	Dino Carlo Chua	62,382	
Lakas	Ryan Enriquez	57,848	
Liberal	Alvin Bunag	36,340	
PRP	Antonio Luna, Jr.	30,520	
Liberal	Edwin Ramirez	24,212	
PRP	Jose Virata	3,876	
Total votes			100

=== 2nd District (Bacoor) ===
- City: Bacoor

Parties are as stated in their certificate of candidacies.

Cavite 2nd District Sangguniang Panlalawigan election
Party	Candidate	Votes	%
Lakas	Edralin Gawaran		
Lakas	Rolando Remulla		
Liberal	Jedidah Del Rosario		
Liberal	Gertrudes Ocampo		
Total votes			

=== 3rd District (Imus City) ===
- City: Imus City

Parties are as stated in their certificate of candidacies.

Cavite 3rd District Sangguniang Panlalawigan election
Party	Candidate	Votes	%
Liberal	Arnel Cantimbuhan	52,141	
Liberal	Larry Boy Nato	51,253	
Nacionalista	Anthony Astillero	19,800	
Nacionalista	Rodrigo Camia, Jr.	19,359	
PMP	Lucius Minaldo	2,062	
Total votes			100

=== 4th District (Dasmariñas) ===
- City: Dasmariñas

Incumbents Teofilo Lara and Raul Rex Mangubat ran unopposed. Parties are as stated in their certificate of candidacies.

Cavite 4th District Sangguniang Panlalawigan election
Party	Candidate	Votes	%
NUP	Teofilo Lara	101,132	
NUP	Raul Rex Mangubat	97,019	
Total votes			100

=== 5th District ===
- Municipality: Carmona, General Mariano Alvarez, Silang

Parties are as stated in their certificate of candidacies.

Cavite 5th District Sangguniang Panlalawigan election
Party	Candidate	Votes	%
Liberal	Aristides Jose Virgilio Velasco	62,057	
Lakas	Marcos Amutan	62,002	
Lakas	Ivee Jayne Reyes	61,265	
Liberal	Alberto Alvarez	32,850	
PMP	Renato Gadiola	3,866	
Total votes			100

=== 6th District ===
- City: Trece Martires City
- Municipality: Amadeo, General Trias, Tanza

Parties are as stated in their certificate of candidacies.

Cavite 6th District Sangguniang Panlalawigan election
Party	Candidate	Votes	%
Liberal	Hermogenes Arayata III	77,548	
Lakas	Felix Grepo	75,605	
Lakas	Archangelo Matro	54,437	
Liberal	Remegio Dilag	51,029	
Bangon Pilipinas	Mayrine Leachon	10,184	
Bangon Pilipinas	Teodora Bacolod	8,844	
Total votes			100

=== 7th District ===
- City: Tagaytay
- Municipality: Alfonso, Bailen, Indang, Magallanes, Maragondon, Mendez, Naic, Ternate

Parties are as stated in their certificate of candidacies.

Cavite 7th District Sangguniang Panlalawigan election
Party	Candidate	Votes	%
Liberal	Eileen Beratio	79,538	
Nacionalista	Irene Bencito	65,795	
Liberal	Reyniel Ambion	64,972	
Nacionalista	Raquel Nuestro Quiambao	62,361	
DPP	Arnolfo Colaban	1,369	
Total votes			100

== City and municipal elections ==
All cities and municipalities of Cavite elected a mayor and vice-mayor this election. The candidates for mayor and vice mayor with the highest number of votes wins the seat; they are voted separately, therefore, they may be of different parties when elected. Below is the list of mayoralty and vice-mayoralty candidates of each city and municipalities per district. Names in italics denote the incumbents.

=== 1st District ===
- City: Cavite City
- Municipality: Kawit, Noveleta, Rosario

==== Cavite City ====
Cavite City mayoralty election
Party	Candidate	Votes	%
Lakas	Bernardo Paredes	21,234	52.15
Liberal	Lino Antonio Barron	12,787	31.40
UNA	Romeo Ramos	6,698	16.45
Total votes		40,719	100
Lakas gain from UNA			

Cavite City vice mayoralty election
Party	Candidate	Votes	%
Lakas	Percilito Consigo	22,449	58.56
Liberal	Edmund Tirona	15,890	41.45
Total votes		38,339	100
Lakas gain from Liberal			

==== Kawit ====
Kawit mayoralty election
Party	Candidate	Votes	%
Liberal	Reynaldo Aguinaldo	13,826	52.64
Lakas	Gilbert Gandia	12,441	47.36
Total votes		26,267	100
Liberal hold			

Kawit vice mayoralty election
Party	Candidate	Votes	%
Liberal	Paul Plaridel Abaya, Jr.	13,908	54.60
Lakas	Medel Caimol	11,566	45.40
Total votes		25,474	100
Liberal gain from Lakas			

==== Noveleta ====
Noveleta mayoralty election
Party	Candidate	Votes	%
Nacionalista	Enrico Alvarez	11,893	100
Total votes		11,893	100
Nacionalista hold			

Noveleta vice mayoralty election
Party	Candidate	Votes	%
Nacionalista	Eric Garcia	5,566	38.94
Liberal	Claro Jordan Santamaria	5,054	35.36
Ang Kapatiran	Arlynn Torres	3,674	25.70
Total votes		14,294	100
Nacionalista hold			

==== Rosario ====
Rosario mayoralty election
Party	Candidate	Votes	%
Lakas	Jose Ricafrente, Jr.	28,832	100
Total votes		28,832	100
Lakas hold			

Rosario vice mayoralty election
Party	Candidate	Votes	%
Lakas	Jose Voltaire Ricafrente	27,817	100
Total votes		27,817	100
Lakas hold			

=== 2nd District ===
- City: Bacoor

==== Bacoor ====
Bacoor mayoralty election
Party	Candidate	Votes	%
Lakas	Strike Revilla	119,394	
Liberal	Ramon Guinto		
PMP	Fidel Abaya		
Total votes			
Lakas hold			

Bacoor vice mayoralty election
Party	Candidate	Votes	%
Lakas	Catherine Evaristo	80,388	
Liberal	Edwin Malvar		
PMP	Jaime Malvar		
Total votes			
Lakas gain from UNA			

=== 3rd District ===
- City: Imus City

==== Imus City ====
Imus City mayoralty election
Party	Candidate	Votes	%
Liberal	Emmanuel Maliksi	52,137	51.27
Nacionalista	Homer Saquilayan	49,562	48.73
Total votes		101,699	100
Liberal hold			

Imus City vice mayoralty election
Party	Candidate	Votes	%
Liberal	Armando Ilano	53,676	61.82
Nacionalista	Patrizenette Villena	33,149	38.18
Total votes		86,825	100
Liberal hold			

=== 4th District ===
- City: Dasmariñas

==== Dasmariñas ====
Dasmariñas mayoralty election
Party	Candidate	Votes	%
NUP	Jennifer Barzaga	127,678	
Lakas	Gavino Mercado	26,712	
PMP	Ma. Lourdes Garcia	1,335	
Total votes			100
NUP hold			

Dasmariñas vice mayoralty election
Party	Candidate	Votes	%
NUP	Valeriano Encabo	105,718	
Lakas	Antonio "Damo" Ferrer	37,520	
Total votes			100
NUP hold			

=== 5th District ===
- Municipality: Carmona, General Mariano Alvarez, Silang

==== Carmona ====
Carmona mayoralty election
Party	Candidate	Votes	%
Liberal	Dahlia Loyola	23,127	89.47
Lakas	Jose Carpio	2,723	10.53
Total votes		25,850	100
Liberal hold			

Carmona vice mayoralty election
Party	Candidate	Votes	%
Liberal	Elmer Reyes	21,016	85.82
Lakas	Charlie Martinez	3,472	14.18
Total votes		24,488	100
Liberal hold			

==== General Mariano Alvarez ====
General Mariano Alvarez mayoralty election
Party	Candidate	Votes	%
Liberal	Walter Echevarria, Jr.	16,917	47.05
Lakas	Leonisa Joanna Virata	9,558	26.58
PLM	Bongbong Sevilla	4,920	13.72
UNA	Rolando Alvaran	4,388	12.20
Nacionalista	Arnel Mendoza	174	0.48
Total votes		35,857	100
Liberal gain from Lakas			

General Mariano Alvarez vice mayoralty election
Party	Candidate	Votes	%
Lakas	Percival Cabuhat	21,826	64.38
Liberal	Renante Tuatis	10,295	30.37
UNA	Renato Avendaño	1,781	5.25
Total votes		33,902	100
Liberal hold			

==== Silang ====
Silang mayoralty election
Party	Candidate	Votes	%
Lakas	Emilia Lourdes Poblete	27,055	42.75
Liberal	Armando De Castro	22,267	35.18
UNA	Herminigildo Linaja	11,509	18.18
Bangon Pilipinas	Ruben Madlansacay	2,980	4.71
KBL	Pablito Angcaya	112	0.18
Total votes		63,293	100
Lakas hold			

Silang vice mayoralty election
Party	Candidate	Votes	%
Liberal	Rosalie Loyola	30,964	52.66
Lakas	Ferdinand Belamide	27,836	47.34
Total votes		58,800	100
Liberal gain from UNA			

=== 6th District ===
- City: Trece Martires City
- Municipality: Amadeo, General Trias, Tanza

==== Trece Martires City ====
Trece Martires City mayoralty election
Party	Candidate	Votes	%
Lakas	Melandres De Sagun	23,695	100
Total votes		23,695	100
Lakas hold			

Trece Martires City vice mayoralty election
Party	Candidate	Votes	%
Lakas	Alexander Lubigan	23,695	100
Total votes		23,695	100
Lakas hold			

==== Amadeo ====
Amadeo mayoralty election
Party	Candidate	Votes	%
Lakas	Benjarde Villanueva	6,639	48.56
Liberal	Albert Ambagan	6,141	44.92
KBL	Augusto Bebe, Jr.	891	6.52
Total votes		13,671	100
Lakas hold			

Amadeo vice mayoralty election
Party	Candidate	Votes	%
Lakas	Elpidio Bawalan	7,985	61.10
Liberal	Donn Clarence Bayot	5,085	38.90
Total votes		13,070	100
Lakas hold			

==== General Trias ====
General Trias mayoralty election
Party	Candidate	Votes	%
NUP	Antonio Ferrer	40,897	66.29
Liberal	Fernando Campaña	20,794	33.71
Total votes		61,691	100
NUP hold			

General Trias vice mayoralty election
Party	Candidate	Votes	%
NUP	Maurito Sison	30,283	61.62
Liberal	Ronald Lumunsad	19,222	38.83
Total votes		49,505	100
NUP gain from Liberal			

==== Tanza ====
Tanza mayoralty election
Party	Candidate	Votes	%
Liberal	Marcus Ashley Arayata	23,281	50.34
Lakas	Raymundo Del Rosario	22,741	49.16
PMP	Macario Cervania	230	0.50
Total votes		46,253	100
Liberal hold			

Tanza vice mayoralty election
Party	Candidate	Votes	%
Liberal	Yuri Pacumio	21,923	49.77
Lakas	Sandy De Peralta	20,792	47.20
PMP	Redentor Sosa	1,337	3.04
Total votes		44,052	100
Liberal hold			

=== 7th District ===
- City: Tagaytay
- Municipality: Alfonso, Bailen, Indang, Magallanes, Maragondon, Mendez, Naic, Ternate

==== Tagaytay ====
Tagaytay mayoralty election
Party	Candidate	Votes	%
Liberal	Agnes Tolentino	18,771	57.60
Nacionalista	Jesus Crispin Remulla	13,818	42.40
Total votes		32,589	100
Liberal hold			

Tagaytay vice mayoralty election
Party	Candidate	Votes	%
Liberal	Celso De Castro	17,059	57.52
Nacionalista	Arnel Taruc	12,601	42.48
Total votes		29,660	100
Liberal hold			

==== Alfonso ====
Alfonso mayoralty election
Party	Candidate	Votes	%
Lakas	Virgilio Varias		
Liberal	Juanito Rosanes		
PMP	Delio Escoses		
Total votes			
Lakas hold			

Alfonso vice mayoralty election
Party	Candidate	Votes	%
Lakas	Justiniano Castro		
Liberal	Romeo Cosino		
PMP	Manolito Credo		
Independent	Francis Romasanta		
Total votes			
Lakas gain from Nacionalista			

==== Bailen ====
Note: Bailen was listed as General Emilio Aguinaldo, its former name, in the ballots.

Bailen mayoralty election
Party	Candidate	Votes	%
Nacionalista	Danilo Bencito		
Liberal	Reynato Malimban		
Total votes			
Nacionalista hold			

Bailen vice mayoralty election
Party	Candidate	Votes	%
Nacionalista	Louel Golfo		
Liberal	Darwin Quiacos		
PMP	Efren Papa		
Total votes			
Nacionalista hold			

==== Indang ====
Indang mayoralty election
Party	Candidate	Votes	%
Nacionalista	Bienvenido Dimero		
Liberal	Lope Tepora		
Total votes			
Nacionalista hold			

Indang vice mayoralty election
Party	Candidate	Votes	%
Nacionalista	Perfecto Fidel		
Liberal	Ariel Penales		
Total votes			
Nacionalista hold			

==== Magallanes ====
Magallanes mayoralty election
Party	Candidate	Votes	%
Nacionalista	Edwin Sisante		
Liberal	Elvira Bergado		
KBL	Lucia Ruiz		
Total votes			
Nacionalista hold			

Magallanes vice mayoralty election
Party	Candidate	Votes	%
Nacionalista	Jasmin Angelli Maligaya		
Liberal	Nerie Villa		
Total votes			
Nacionalista hold			

==== Maragondon ====
Maragondon mayoralty election
Party	Candidate	Votes	%
Liberal	Reynaldo Rillo		
Nacionalista	Mon Anthony Andaman		
Total votes			
Liberal gain from Nacionalista			

Maragondon vice mayoralty election
Party	Candidate	Votes	%
Nacionalista	Ireneo Angeles		
Liberal	Reagan Gulapa		
PMP	Bonn Rillo		
Total votes			
Nacionalista hold			

==== Mendez ====
Mendez mayoralty election
Party	Candidate	Votes	%
Nacionalista	Fredderick Vida		
Liberal	Ralph Sarmiento		
Total votes			
Nacionalista hold			

Mendez vice mayoralty election
Party	Candidate	Votes	%
Liberal	Francisco Mendoza, Jr.		
Nacionalista	Antonio Rafols		
Total votes			
Liberal hold			

==== Naic ====
Naic mayoralty election
Party	Candidate	Votes	%
Nacionalista	Junio Dualan		
Liberal	Edwina Mendoza		
Total votes			
Nacionalista gain from Liberal			

Naic vice mayoralty election
Party	Candidate	Votes	%
Nacionalista	Rodrigo Castillo		
Liberal	Fernando Prudente		
Total votes			
Nacionalista hold			

==== Ternate ====
Ternate mayoralty election
Party	Candidate	Votes	%
Nacionalista	Herminio Lindo		
Liberal	Lamberto Bambao		
PMP	Erlinda Huerto		
Total votes			
Nacionalista gain from Liberal			

Ternate vice mayoralty election
Party	Candidate	Votes	%
Nacionalista	Gomez Linayao, Jr.		
Liberal	Jayson Cabaña		
Total votes			
Nacionalista gain from Liberal			
