= Epimaco Velasco =

Filipino lawyer and politician (1935-2014)

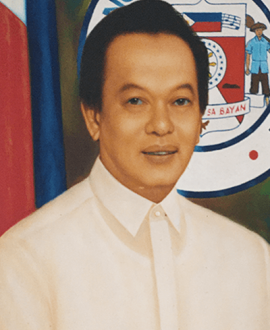

17th Secretary of the Interior and Local Government
- In office February 4, 1998 – May 30, 1998
- President: Fidel Ramos
- Preceded by: Robert Barbers
- Succeeded by: Sonny Collantes (OIC)

32nd Governor of Cavite
- In office June 30, 1995 – February 4, 1998 (Note: Resigned as Governor of Cavite when appointed by President Fidel Ramos as Secretary of the Interior and Local Government.)
- Vice Governor: Bong Revilla
- Preceded by: Juanito R. Remulla
- Succeeded by: Bong Revilla

12th Director of the National Bureau of Investigation
- In office June 30, 1992 – June 30, 1995
- President: Fidel V. Ramos
- Preceded by: Alfredo Lim
- Succeeded by: Antonio D. Aragon

Personal details
- Born: Epimaco Ardina Velasco; December 12, 1935 Tanza, Cavite, Philippine Commonwealth
- Died: January 27, 2014 (aged 78) Philippines
- Resting place: Sta. Cruz Memorial Park, Tanza, Cavite
- Party: Lakas (1995–2004)
- Education: Lyceum of the Philippines University
- Occupation: Politician
- Profession: Lawyer

Epimaco Ardina Velasco (December 12, 1935 – January 27, 2014), popularly known as Epi, was a Filipino lawyer and politician who served as Secretary of the Interior and Local Government, Provincial Governor of Cavite, and Director of the National Bureau of Investigation (NBI). He was the first NBI Director who rose from the ranks and rose to prominence at the Bureau with the killing of Number 1 Most Wanted Man in Cavite, Leonardo Manecio aka Nardong Putik.

== Early life and career ==
Epimaco Ardina Velasco was born on December 12, 1935, in Tanza, Cavite. He finished his college at the Lyceum of the Philippines with a Bachelor of Laws in 1960. Velasco rose from the ranks to become one of the most admired directors of the National Bureau of Investigation. As an agent, Epimaco initiated the raid on Hankook Tires, and as Bureau chief, he spearheaded the NBI in its quest to solve crimes and at the same time, to curb corruption among its ranks.

=== Capturing Nardong Putik ===
As a fugitive, Nardong Putik and his men were involved in the illegal cultivation of marijuana and money extortion activities. On February 10, 1971, the National Bureau of Investigation's Narcotics division surveyed a marijuana plantation in Imus, Cavite allegedly being protected by Putik. Two NBI Agents, Rogelio Domingo and Antonio Dayao were captured, tortured, and killed by Putik and his men. NBI Director Jolly Bugarin ordered all his agents to capture dead or alive Nardo and all responsible for the death of Domingo and Dayao. NBI Agent Epimaco "Epi" Velasco was then installed as the new Chief of the NBI Narcotics Division. In a month's time, they were able to record the movements of Putik. Later, with enough data, they were able to track his full whereabouts confidently to enable them to launch the operation to capture him on October 10, 1971.

The operation which was a joint NBI-PC-Imus police force was composed of some 20 men. Troopers from the 233rd PC Company were led by Cpt. Manuel Bruan. At 5:00 in the morning, the light of the house of the mistress of Nardo went out. After a few minutes, Nardo drove his Chevrolet Impala car out to the main Manila-Cavite highway. For unknown reasons, or maybe Putik sensed that he was being tailed by the Philippine Constabulary, he was able to escape the PC dragnet or checkpoint at Panamitan and Talon, Kawit, Cavite. However, Putik did not notice a Volkswagen Kombi tailing him in the highway at the same time. The Kombi contained NBI Agents Velasco, Nasol, Utico, Bautista and others. They chased Nardo's car, and at Noveleta, Cavite, they were able to overtake the Impala and was on the right side of the car. He sensed the danger and immediately reached for his .45 pistol. At that moment, the NBI Agents opened fire with their revolvers, carbines, and submachine guns, peppering the car, and causing Nardo's instant death. The car lurched to the side of the highway and stopped. The Agents then immediately jumped out of their vehicle and took cover. Some Agents were still firing their guns to make sure that Nardo will not retaliate. The Impala was later hauled into NBI Headquarters in Manila, with the dead Putik inside, in full view of Director Bugarin. The news became a flash report on local television, and a top newspaper story the next day. That mission cemented the fame of Agent Velasco, who later became NBI Director in the nineties.

== Political career ==
In 1995, Velasco ran for Governor, with Bong Revilla, son of Senator Ramon Revilla as his running mate under Lakas–Laban Coalition. He defeated the incumbent Governor Johnny Remulla of the Nationalist Peoples Coalition. In the 2001 elections, he ran as Congressman of 2nd district of Cavite but was defeated by former ABS-CBN reporter Gilbert Remulla, son of the former Governor Remulla and in 2004, he ran again for Governor and once again was defeated by incumbent Governor Ayong Maliksi.

== Government service ==
- Secretary of the Interior and Local Government (Feb 4, 1998 to May 30, 1998)
- Provincial Governor of Cavite (1995–1998)
- Director, National Bureau of Investigation (1992–1995)
- Assistant Director, National Bureau of Investigation (1988–1992)
- Acting Director, National Bureau of Investigation (1992)

== Personal life ==
Velasco first served as a helper in the city court of Manila from 1955 to 1962 while studying. He entered any opportunity for the betterment of his career until 1960 when he finally graduated and attained Bachelor of Laws. Two years after, he entered the NBI and became an NBI Agent I. In 1988, he became the assistant director of the department, and in 1992, he finally became the director of the department.

His life story was made into a movie in 1994, entitled Epimaco Velasco: NBI where he was portrayed by Fernando Poe Jr. He was also portrayed by Ricky Davao in Mariano Mison: NBI, but his name changed to Levi Nolasco.

== Death ==
On January 27, 2014, Velasco died due to heart failure at the age of 78.

== Awards and recognitions received ==
- Presidential Commendation - In connection with the operation which resulted in the killing of Nardong Putik, Public Enemy No.1 of Cavite.
- 1991 Gintong Ama Awardee for public service.
- 1993 Most Outstanding Alumnus, College of Law, Lyceum of the Philippines.
- September 22, 1993, 1st Place-Hall of Fame/ Hoy Gising Award given by ABS-CBN Broadcasting Corporation during the 1st Anniversary of Hoy Gising!, a public service TV program.
- January 1994 - No. 6 among 24 outstanding Public Servants as cited by Senator Ernesto Maceda.
- January 6, 1994- Fighting Cock Special Award, Progressive Alliance of Citizens for Democracy (PACD)
- May 1994 Dean Marcos Herras Award, Most Outstanding National Official, International Rotary Club District 3780.
- 1997 Gintong Ama Awardee for Public Services.
