= Tanza National Comprehensive High School =

Public high school in Cavite, Philippines

- Masaklaw na Pambansang Mataas na Paaralan ng Tanza (Filipino)
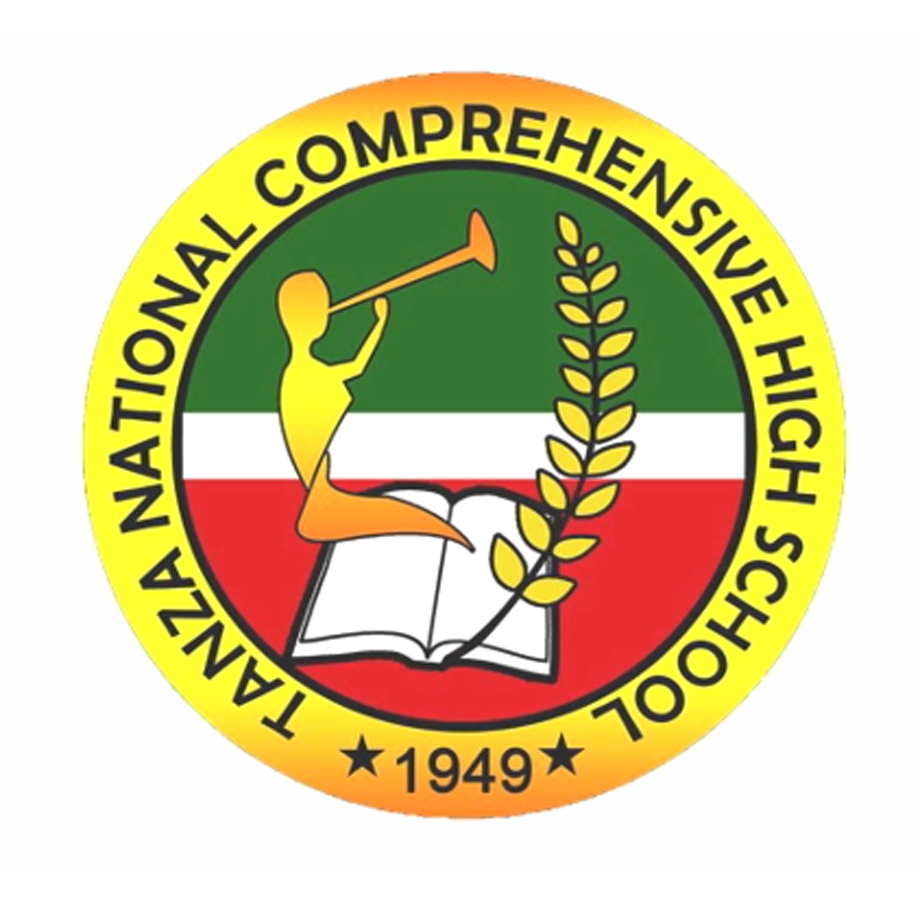

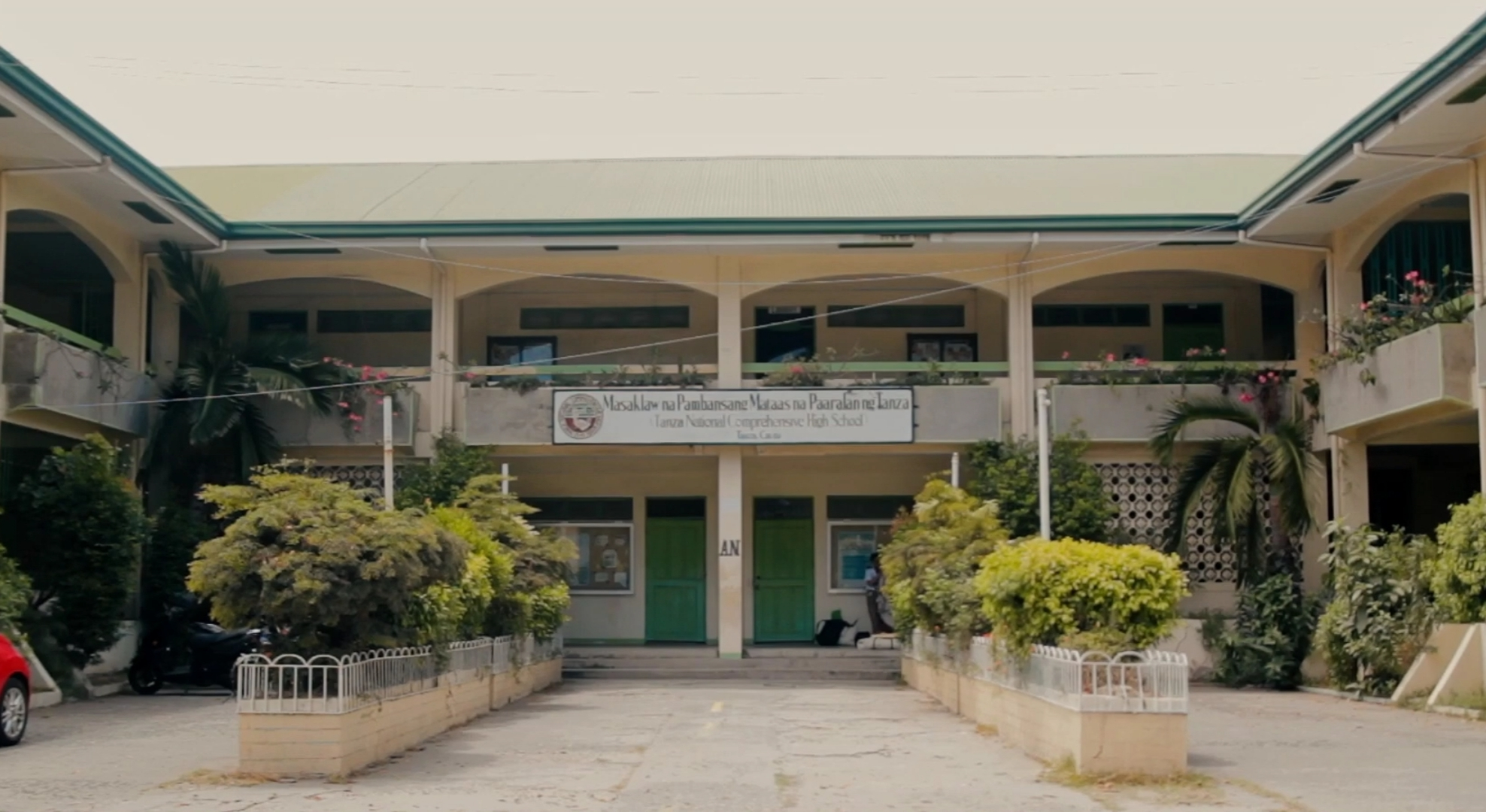

Location
- Tanza, Cavite; Philippines; 14°23′50″N 120°51′10″E

Information
- Type: Public High School
- Established: 1949; 77 years ago
- Principal: Dr. Florencio C. Costa
- Grades: 7-12
- Campus: Tanza, Cavite
- Colors: Green and White
- Nickname: TNCHS, Tanza High
- Newspaper: The Clarion (English); Ang Klaryon (Filipino)
- DepEd School ID: 301218
- Hymn: Larawan at Kinang

Tanza National Comprehensive High School (Filipino: Masaklaw na Pambansang Mataas na Paaralan ng Tanza) is a public high school located at Daang Amaya II, Tanza, Cavite, Philippines. The school is abbreviated as TNCHS or simply Tanza High. It was established in the year 1949.

== Academic Programs ==
Tanza National Comprehensive High School offers 5 programs for Junior High School. Under the Strengthened Senior High School Curriculum, the school offers 2 academic tracks with a total of 7 electives for Senior High School.

Junior High School Programs

- General Curriculum (BEC-Basic Education Curriculum)
- Special Science Curriculum (SSC) / Science, Technology, and Engineering (STE)
- Special Program in the Arts (SPA)
- Special Program in Foreign Language [Korean] (SPFL)
- Special Program for Journalism (SPJ)

Senior High School Tracks and Electives

Academic Track

- Arts, Social Sciences, and Humanities (ASSH)
- Business and Entrepreneurship (BE)
- Science, Technology, Engineering and Mathematics (STEM)

Technical Professional (TechPro) Track

- Computer Systems Servicing (CSS)
- Electronics Installation and Maintenance (EIM)
- Electronics Products Assembly and Servicing (EPAS)
- Visual Graphic Design (VGD)

== Notable alumni ==
- Epimaco Velasco - former DILG Secretary and NBI Director
