= Jonvic Remulla =

Filipino politician (born 1967)

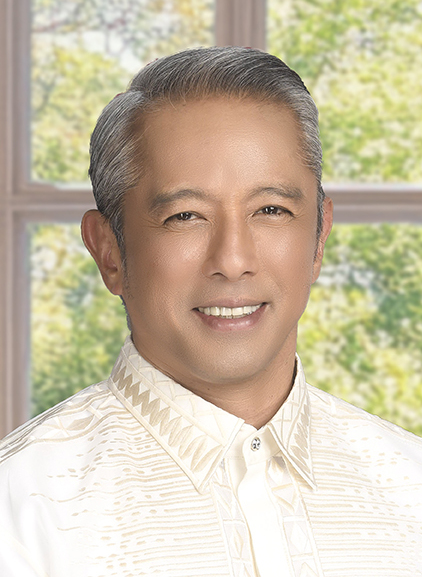
- Official portrait, 2024

42nd Secretary of the Interior and Local Government
- Incumbent
- Assumed office October 8, 2024
- President: Bongbong Marcos
- Preceded by: Benhur Abalos

35th and 37th Governor of Cavite
- In office June 30, 2019 – October 8, 2024
- Vice Governor: Jolo Revilla (2019–2022); Athena Tolentino (2022–2024)
- Preceded by: Jesus Crispin Remulla
- Succeeded by: Athena Tolentino
- In office June 30, 2010 – June 30, 2016
- Vice Governor: Recto Cantimbuhan (2010–2013); Jolo Revilla (2013–2016)
- Preceded by: Ayong Maliksi
- Succeeded by: Jesus Crispin Remulla

Vice Governor of Cavite
- In office February 6, 1998 – June 30, 2007
- Governor: Bong Revilla (1998–2001); Ayong Maliksi (2001–2007)
- Preceded by: Bong Revilla
- Succeeded by: Dencito Campaña

Member of the Cavite Provincial Board from the 2nd district
- In office June 30, 1995 – February 6, 1998

Personal details
- Born: Juanito Victor Catibayan Remulla Jr. October 23, 1967 (age 59)
- Party: NUP (2021–present); Magdalo (local party; 1995–present)
- Other political affiliations: UNA (2014–2016); Lakas (2012–2014); Nacionalista (2009–2012; 2016–2021); LDP (until 2009); LAMMP (1998–2000)
- Spouse: Agnes Tirona
- Children: 5
- Parent: Juanito Remulla Sr. (father)
- Relatives: Jesus Crispin Remulla (brother); Gilbert Remulla (brother); Crispin Diego Remulla (nephew); Abeng Remulla (nephew); Dia Maté (great-niece)
- Education: University of the Philippines Diliman (AB)
- Profession: Politician

Juanito Victor "Jonvic" Catibayan Remulla Jr. ([ˈdʒɔnbɪk rɛˈmuljɐ]; born October 23, 1967) is a Filipino politician who has served as the 42nd secretary of the interior and local government since 2024. He previously served as the 35th and 37th governor of Cavite from 2019 to 2024 and from 2010 to 2016, and had previously served as vice governor and as a member of the Cavite Provincial Board. He is a son of former governor Juanito Remulla Sr. and sibling of fellow politicians Gilbert and Jesus Crispin Remulla. The Remulla dynasty has been criticized for political turncoatism, abandoning presidential candidate Jejomar Binay for Rodrigo Duterte and later serving President Bongbong Marcos, while Remulla has botched arrests for officials, Atong Ang, as well as Duterte’s staff members while serving as DILG Secretary.

Remulla entered politics in 1995, when he won as board member of the second district of Cavite. Three years later, in 1998, he was elected as vice governor, a post he held for three terms and in 2010, he became governor. He became a governor again when he defeated former governor Ayong Maliksi in the 2019 elections.

== Early life and education ==
Remulla was born on October 23, 1967, to Juanito "Johnny" Remulla, who was then a member of the Cavite Provincial Board and later governor, and Ditas Catibayan. He is a member of the Remulla family, a known political dynasty in Cavite led by his father, who was later elected Cavite governor in 1979. He took up his elementary education at De La Salle University before the school moved to Greenhills, then took secondary education at Ateneo de Manila University. In college, he studied at the University of the Philippines Diliman, where he became a member of the Upsilon Sigma Phi fraternity in direct imitation of his father. He graduated with a degree in philosophy.

== Board member and Vice Governor (1995–2007) ==
In 1995, Remulla ran for board member of Cavite in the second district and won. He ran for vice governor in 1998 and was elected. Three years later, in 2001, he sought reelection with 2nd District Representative Ayong Maliksi, a protégé of his family, as his running mate and their tandem won. The two would win again in the 2004 elections.

Following the election, he broke ties with Maliksi when he filed an administrative case against Maliksi before the Office of the Ombudsman in connection with an anomalous purchase of ₱7.5 million (about US$134,000) worth of rice in 2004. As a result, Maliksi was issued a six-month preventive suspension order on August 15, 2005, and he assumed office as acting governor. Maliksi filed a petition and his suspension was lifted on October 24, 2005, when he was granted a preliminary injunction. Remulla would become acting governor again on April 4, 2006, when the Court of Appeals lifted Maliksi's preliminary injunction. Nine months later, on January 10, 2007, Remulla became acting governor for the third time when the Department of the Interior and Local Government (DILG) ordered the six-month preventive suspension order again on Maliksi. In a surprise announcement the same month, he said he would not run as governor against Maliksi in the May 2007 elections. Ombudsman Merceditas Gutierrez lifted the suspension order a month later for lack of merit.

== Governor (2010–2016, 2019–2024) ==
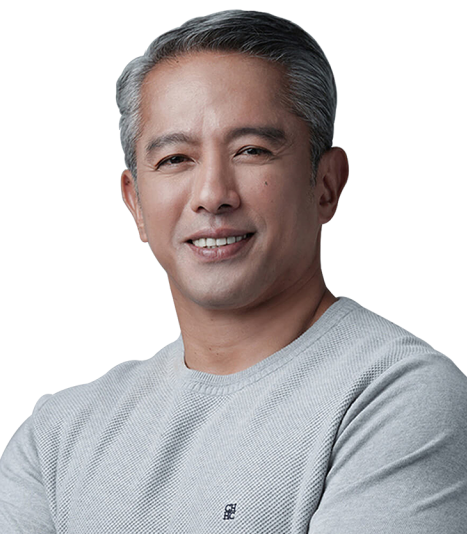
Official portrait of Remulla as the Governor of Cavite.

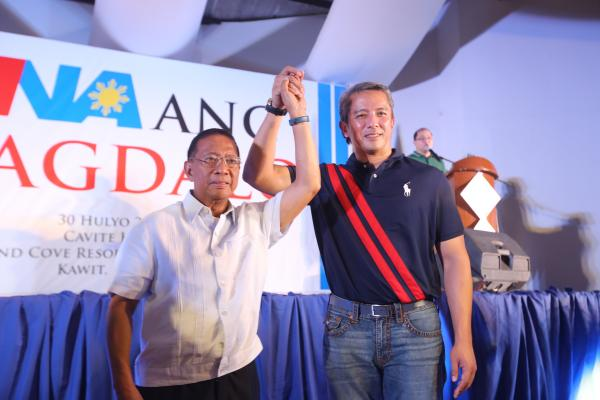
Remulla with Vice President Jejomar Binay.

Remulla made a comeback in politics in 2010, when he ran for governor. In the race, he defeated Vice Governor Dencito Campaña, who had the backing of Maliksi.

Under his tenure, Cavite was cited as one of the top-performing provinces in the Philippines by the Department of the Interior and Local Government (DILG). Also, it is the first and only province to be ISO 9001:2008 certified.

In the 2013 elections, Remulla sought a second term as governor, with actor and Cavite Liga ng mga Barangay (League of Barangays) President Jolo Revilla, son of Senator Bong Revilla and Representative Lani Mercado, as his running mate. Maliksi challenged him in the race. During the campaign, Remulla accused Maliksi of being involved in the anomalous LRT extension project, where ₱500 million (about US$11.162 million) was allotted for 2,000 housing units, road, lighting and water projects, relocation sites and payments for the residents directly affected by the development. Remulla even threatened to resign if his allegations are proven wrong. And he said Mas mabuti ang mamigay, wag lang magnakaw (transl. It's better to give, not to steal) Despite most surveys showing Maliksi would beat him by a wide margin, Remulla went on to win the election by more than 50,000 votes. Jolo Revilla also won, beating Maliksi's running mate, Ronald Jay Lacson, son of Senator Panfilo Lacson.

He was named as one of People Asia magazine's "People of the Year" in 2013.

In 2014, Remulla was assigned by Vice President Jejomar Binay as his new spokesperson. Remulla was supposed to run for his last term as governor in 2016 but he decided to quit as Binay asked him to become secretary of the interior and local government should Binay win the presidency. He also cited plans to pursue postgraduate studies as a reason for retiring from the governorship. His brother, Jesus Crispin, ran in his stead and later won. However, as of April 29, 2016, Remulla was confirmed to have left Binay's camp in support of rival presidential candidate Rodrigo Duterte, and was accused of political turncoatism.

Remulla successfully sought a comeback as governor in 2019, defeating former Governor Maliksi for the second time. He sought re-election 2022 and won, this time with Tagaytay councilor Athena Tolentino, the daughter of 8th district representative Abraham Tolentino, as his running mate. He also supported the successful campaign of presidential candidate Bongbong Marcos and vice-presidential candidate Sara Duterte.

== Secretary of Interior and Local Government (2024–present) ==
Remulla initially intended to run for his third and last consecutive term as the Governor of Cavite in 2025, with incumbent Vice Governor Athena Tolentino as his running mate. However, he and Tolentino withdrew their certificates of candidacy on October 7, 2024, six days after filing those, and he was appointed by President Bongbong Marcos as the secretary of the interior and local government, succeeding senatorial candidate Benhur Abalos. He eventually vacated the post of the Governor of Cavite, of which Vice Governor Tolentino would later assume the governorship to finish out his remaining gubernatorial term from October 8, 2024. He was replaced in the gubernatorial race by his nephew, 7th district Board Member Abeng Remulla.

Remulla took oath as secretary on October 8, 2024.

=== Abandoned 2028 presidential bid ===
On December 22, 2025, Remulla said that there is a possibility that he could run for president in the 2028 Philippine presidential election if it becomes a “one-on-one fight or a two-way battle” and he would need approval by his wife. On January 23, 2026, Remulla is still debating the idea of running for president and has not talked to any political party yet. On February 6, 2026, Remulla added that he won't run if he doesn't get the endorsement of President Bongbong Marcos. On May 8, 2026, Remulla dropped any plans for the presidency and sought to return to Cavite.

=== Botched arrests ===
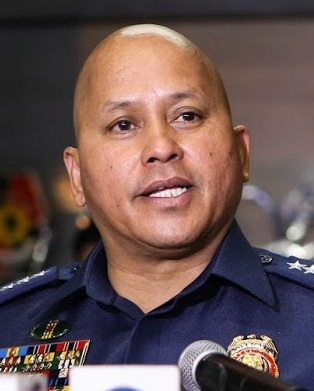
Bato dela Rosa, former police chief accused for crimes against humanity in the War on Drugs.

Remulla was unable to apprehend Zaldy Co in the Czech Republic after failing to obtain the necessary warrants despite his detainment, allowing him to escape to France. This was due to a late application and poor communication with Interpol. Meanwhile, he was seen cajoling and discussing with Senators Allan Cayetano and Robin Padilla moments before Padilla’s exit from the Senate building and criticized discreet accompaniment of Senator Bato dela Rosa in his SUV due to Remulla's claimed inability to serve a local warrant; this is despite the International Criminal Court warrant already issued and enforced by Senator Antonio Trillanes. Remulla was recorded as saying the Senator was safe in the Senate building despite the revelation that such statement was false, as dela Rosa escaped the police on May 14, 2026.

Remulla also confirmed that multiple murder suspect Atong Ang remained at large and did not leave the Philippines, but may be in hiding in Remulla’s home province of Cavite, leading to growing calls for Remulla’s resignation as secretary. He later confirmed that Ang has escaped the Philippines, and was unable to arrest him.

== Personal life ==
Remulla is married to Agnes Tirona, a physician, with whom he has five children. Remulla's hobbies includes exercising regularly, playing golf and basketball, and diving. He is also a known avid reader and often reads during his free time.

Remulla is the team manager of the UP Fighting Maroons (Men's Senior Basketball Team) and was instrumental in recruiting and building the team which eventually ended a 32-year finals drought in the University Athletic Association of the Philippines (UAAP). In game 1 of the 2018 Season 81 basketball finals against top-ranked Ateneo Blue Eagles, Remulla was handed a technical foul in violation of the "cooling-off" period when he attempted to approach the game officials prior to the start of the 3rd quarter.

Remulla is also a fan of South Korean entertainment, noting how Korean dramas and K-pop inspire Filipinos and strengthen cultural ties, as Koreans are also the top tourists in the Philippines. He believes in learning from Korea's achievements, seeing their success as a model Filipinos can aspire to.

== Electoral history ==
Electoral history of Jonvic Remulla
Year	Office	Local Party	National Party	Votes Jonvic Remulla received				Result
Year	Office	Local Party	National Party	Total	%	P.	Swing	Result
1995	Board Member (Cavite–2nd)	Magdalo	LDP	84,530	—N/a	4th	—N/a	Won
1998	Vice Governor of Cavite	Magdalo	LAMMP	385,091	—N/a	—N/a	—N/a	Won
2001	Vice Governor of Cavite	Magdalo	LDP	395,320	—N/a	—N/a	—N/a	Won
2004	Vice Governor of Cavite	Magdalo	LDP	587,188	—N/a	—N/a	—N/a	Won
2010	Governor of Cavite	Magdalo	Nacionalista	467,323	46.47%	1st	—N/a	Won
2013	Governor of Cavite	Magdalo	Lakas	458,434	53.27%	1st	+6.8	Won
2019	Governor of Cavite	Magdalo	Nacionalista	823,913	61.69%	1st	+8.42	Won
2022	Governor of Cavite	Magdalo	NUP	1,368,199	84.67%	1st	+22.98	Won

Political offices
Preceded by Bong Revilla	Vice Governor of Cavite; 1999–2007	Succeeded by Dencito Campaña
Preceded by Ayong Maliksi	Governor of Cavite; 2010–2016	Succeeded by Jesus Crispin Remulla
Preceded by Jesus Crispin Remulla	Governor of Cavite; 2019–2024	Succeeded by Athena Tolentino
Preceded by Benhur Abalos	Secretary of the Interior and Local Government; 2024–present	Incumbent
Party political offices
First	Nacionalista nominee for Governor of Cavite; 2010, 2019	Most recent
First	NUP nominee for Governor of Cavite; 2022	Succeeded by Abeng Remulla
Order of precedence
Preceded by Juan Miguel Cuna as Secretary of Environment and Natural Resources; OIC	Order of Precedence of the Philippines as Secretary of the Interior and Local Government	Succeeded by Dita Angara-Mathay as Secretary of Tourism (Ad interim)
