= Lino Bocalan =

Filipino businessman and politician (1928–2000)

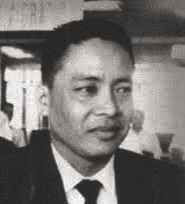
- Bocalan in the 1970s

27th Governor of Cavite
- In office December 30, 1971 – September 24, 1972
- Vice Governor: Dominador Camerino
- Preceded by: Delfin Montano
- Succeeded by: Dominador Camerino

Personal details
- Born: September 28, 1928 Barrio Capipisa, Tanza, Cavite, Philippines
- Died: March 4, 2000 (aged 71) Tanza, Cavite
- Party: Nacionalista
- Spouse: Juana Bocalan
- Children: 11

Lino Dimaala Bocalan (September 28, 1928 – March 4, 2000) was a Filipino businessman and politician from Tanza who served as the 26th governor of Cavite. Born to a poor family, he lived as an illiterate fisherman. After World War II however, Bocalan sold leftover gunpowder to Mindanao merchants in exchange for cigarettes, elevating his socioeconomic status through smuggling and becoming a millionaire at a relatively young age, which attracted many politicians into gaining his support and funding. He first worked for Justiniano Montano, and eventually Ferdinand Marcos. His association with Marcos benefitted his run for governor, winning the position in 1971. However his term was cut short after the declaration of martial law and he was placed under house arrest on September 24, 1972, and was eventually replaced by Vice Governor Dominador Camerino.

== Early life ==
Bocalan was born on September 28, 1928 at the barrio of Capipisa in the town of Santa Cruz de Malabon (now Tanza) in Cavite. He was the son of Andres Bocalan and Catalina Dimaala. Due to a lack of formal education, Bocalan grew up illiterate, but was supposedly exceptional when it came to numbers. As the town of Tanza was well known for its engagement in commercial fishing, Bocalan was a fisherman by profession.

== Illegal cigarette trade ==
=== Start of smuggling operations ===
Bocalan's life changed drastically at the end of World War II, when there were leftovers of gunpowder from Japanese and American ships. Using his background as a fisherman to his advantage, he acquired some of the gunpowder stockpile to trade with the merchants from Mindanao, who needed gunpowder mainly for dynamite fishing. They provided him with imported blue-seal cigarettes from Borneo in return, which the merchants acquired easily due to the lack of regulation in the shores of Sulu Sea.

=== Direct trade with Sabah ===
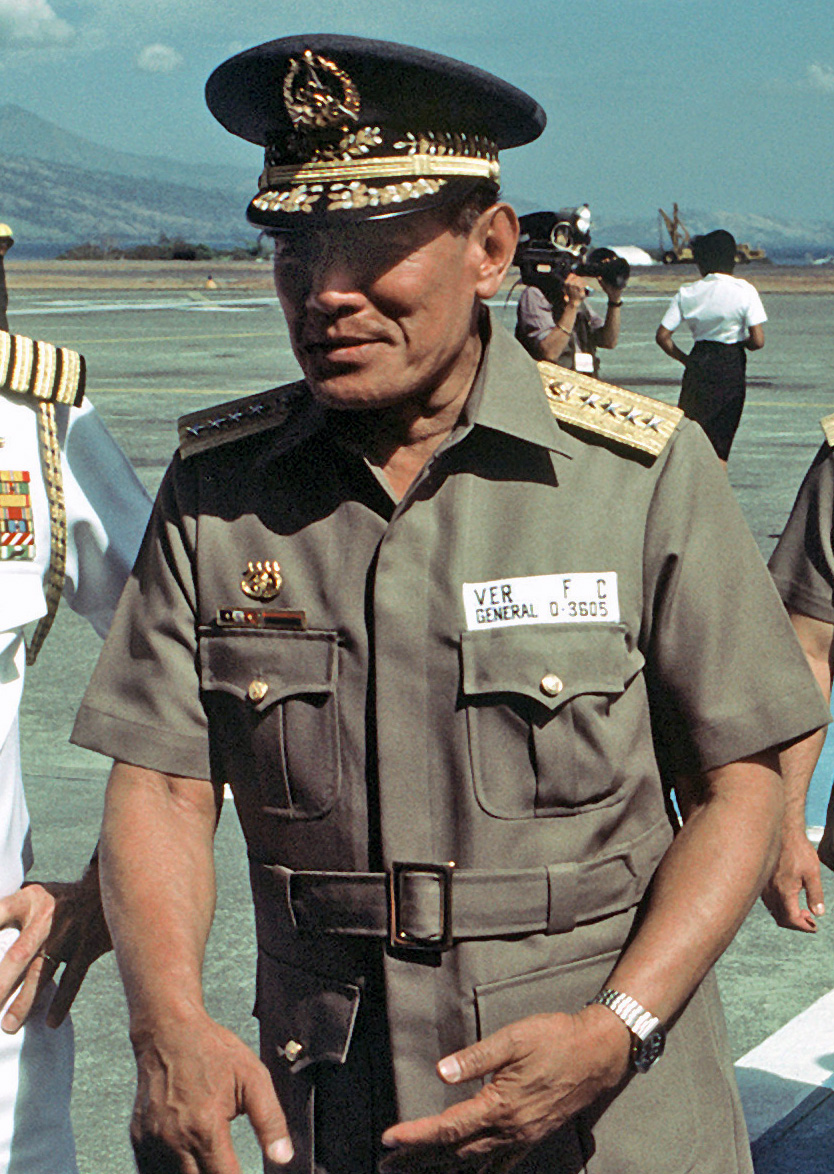
Fabian Ver

Eventually figuring out the flow of cigarette trade, he cut off ties with the Mindanao merchants to smuggle from Borneo directly for cheaper prices, making use of 50 of his fast moving fishing boats and landing on several points in Sabah such as the Tambisan Point, Lahad Datu, and Semporna, allowing him to profit heavily into becoming relatively wealthy by 1957 at the age of 28, making ₱1.8 million a month. According to President Diosdado Macapagal, top government officials and the Philippine Constabulary in Cavite, including the Provincial Commander Fabian Ver, were involved in Bocalan's operations.

By then, Bocalan shifted his attention towards the gunrunning industry, making large profits by trading with the CIA and the Kuomintang, as well as sending guns and ammunition to the revolutionaries in the island of Sumatra in Indonesia in February 1958, who were intent on overthrowing Sukarno's regime in the country. However, Bocalan's smuggling scandal was exposed in 1963, leading to his conviction and eventual imprisonment.

== Political career ==
=== Entrance to politics ===
Bocalan was a known ally and financier of Justiniano Montano and Ferdinand Marcos, being the principal southern outlet for Ilocano and Chinese syndicate bringing goods from Taiwan and Hong Kong to the Philippines. In 1965, after the loss of Macapagal to Marcos in his reelection campaign, Marcos guaranteed the safety of Bocalan from any kind of persecution, freeing Bocalan and allowing him to continue his smuggling and gunrunning business in Cavite. However, Bocalan remained affiliated with Montano, much to the dismay of Marcos. Thus in 1966, Marcos named both Montano and Bocalan as leaders of a major syndicate in Cavite, and by August of the same year, Marcos began a crackdown of Bocalan's activities such as the infiltration of Constabulary officers affiliated to Bocalan at Brgy. Panamitan in Kawit while in the middle of an altercation with a sentry. The pressure imposed by Marcos forced Bocalan to disassociate himself from Montano in order to avoid further pressure from Marcos. Bocalan would end up defecting to Marcos.

In the late 1960s, Bocalan won a lot of the sweepstake draws supervised by the Philippine Charity Sweepstakes Office. He was suspected of switching tickets by a lawmaker, but it was suggested that he bought the tickets from the real owners, as a form of money laundering to conceal his real source of income.

=== Involvement in Operation Merdeka ===
In 1967, Marcos initiated the planning of Operation Merdeka, which was an operation to invade the state of Sabah, which was incorporated relatively recently into Malaysia back then, having only been incorporated in 1963. According to an interview in 1998, Bocalan, with his extensive knowledge of Sabah, was involved in the operation in which he supposedly funded the project to help Marcos, accounting for the food and salaries of the recruits. As Justiniano Montano, the de facto ruler of Cavite at the time, was supportive of the Liberal Party which opposed Operation Merdeka, this act created tensions between Montano and Bocalan.

=== Run for governorship and downfall ===
In 1971, Bocalan, along with his running mate and former governor Dominador Camerino, ran for the position of governor and for vice governor respectively under the banner of the Nacionalista Party, positions which they both won, defeating Governor Delfin Montano of Cavite. The Montanos were dislodged almost entirely and Bocalan converted Tanza into his own powerbase. On September 24, 1972, a day after the televised announcement of Martial Law, Bocalan was put under house arrest at Urdaneta Village in Makati thereby confiscating several guns, in Marcos’ attempt to gain public support through his fair crackdown on smuggling and warlordism, replacing him with Vice Governor Dominador Camerino on October 1 of the same year.

He died on March 4, 2000 at the age of 71.

== Personal life ==
Lino Bocalan had a wife, Juana, in which they had 8 children. He also had three siblings, one of whom is his sister, Lucia Bocalan Calixto. In addition, he had several houses in San Francisco, California as well as in Urdaneta Village in Makati, other luxurious properties as well as owning a Mercedes Benz. Bocalan was also involved in a tax evasion case in Manila.

== Legacy ==
A public school in Brgy. Timalan Balsahan in Naic was named as the Lino Bocalan Elementary School, near Bocalan's hometown in Capipisa in nearby Tanza, in honor of his service as governor.

== See also ==
- Revolutionary Government of the Republic of Indonesia
- CIA activities in Indonesia
- Diosdado Macapagal
- Justiniano Montano
- Ferdinand Marcos
- Jabidah massacre
