= Jolo Revilla =

Filipino actor and politician (born 1988)

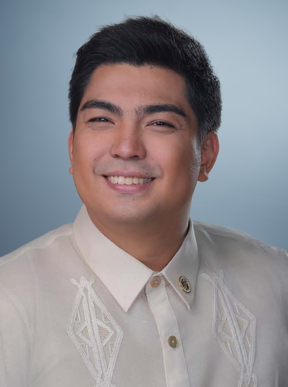
- Official portrait, 2025

Member of the Philippine House of Representatives from Cavite's 1st district
- Incumbent
- Assumed office June 30, 2022
- Preceded by: Francis Gerald Abaya

Vice Governor of Cavite
- In office June 30, 2013 – June 30, 2022
- Governor: Jonvic Remulla (2013–2016, 2019–2022); Jesus Crispin Remulla (2016–2019)
- Preceded by: Recto Cantimbuhan
- Succeeded by: Athena Tolentino

Barangay Captain of Barangay Panapaan VII, Bacoor, Cavite
- In office 2010–2013

Personal details
- Born: Jose Lorenzo Hernandez Bautista III; March 15, 1988 (age 38) Makati, Philippines
- Party: NUP (2026–present); Magdalo (local party; 2012–present)
- Other political affiliations: Lakas (2012–2017; 2021–2026); NPC (2018–2021); PDP–Laban (2017–2018)
- Spouse: Angelica Alita (m. 2019)
- Relations: Ramon Revilla Sr. (grandfather); Strike Revilla (uncle); Bryan Revilla (brother)
- Children: 2
- Parents: Bong Revilla (father); Lani Mercado (mother)
- Education: Lyceum of the Philippines University – Cavite (BA)
- Profession: Actor; comedian; politician
- Website: www.jolorevilla.ph - Official website

Ramon "Jolo" Revilla III (Tagalog pronunciation: [rɛˈbiljɐ]; born Jose Lorenzo Hernandez Bautista III; March 15, 1988) is a Filipino actor, comedian, and politician who has served as the representative for Cavite's first district since 2022. Before being elected to Congress, he served as the vice governor of Cavite from 2013 until 2022.

As a congressman, Revilla is among the proponents for an increase in the minimum wage of the private sector.

== Early life and career ==
Revilla was born as Jose Lorenzo Hernandez Bautista III on March 15, 1988, to actors Bong Revilla and Lani Mercado. Revilla originally signed with GMA Network but later transferred to its rival network ABS-CBN. In 2009, he took the lead role in the TV series remake of Pepeng Agimat, which was originally topbilled by his grandfather Ramon Revilla Sr. Revilla played the role of Ramon Salcedo in the 2008 TV series remake of Kaputol ng Isang Awit.

== Political career ==
During the barangay elections on October 25, 2010, Revilla ran as Barangay Captain of Panapaan VII in Bacoor, Cavite and was elected. He later became the President of the Association of Barangay Captains in Cavite, which automatically landed him a seat as an ex-officio member of the Cavite Provincial Board.

Revilla ran for vice governor of Cavite in the 2013 elections, with incumbent Governor Jonvic Remulla as his running mate. Together, they beat the rival tandem of Ronald Jay Lacson, son of Senator Panfilo Lacson, and former Governor Ayong Maliksi, respectively. At the age of 25, he became the youngest ever to be elected vice governor of Cavite, a distinction later broken by his successor Athena Tolentino, who was 24 when she took office in 2022. He was re-elected in 2016 and in 2019 as the running mate of Jesus Crispin Remulla and Jonvic Remulla, respectively.

In 2022, Revilla ran for representative of Cavite's first district. He defeated former Kawit Vice Mayor Paul Abaya in the elections, ending the 28-year rule of the Abayas in the district. He was re-elected in 2025.

== Personal life ==
Revilla is married to Binibining Pilipinas 2016 first runner-up Angelica Alita. They married in a Christian wedding ceremony in California, US, in 2019. He also has one son with Grace Adriano, the daughter of actress Rosanna Roces. Revilla and Alita's first child was born on January 30, 2024.

=== Alleged shooting attempt ===
On February 28, 2015, Revilla was cleaning his Glock semi-automatic pistol when he sustained an accidental self-inflicted gunshot wound at his father's residence in Ayala Alabang, Muntinlupa, and was rushed to the Asian Hospital and Medical Center. Revilla was under observation for a time until March 28 when he resumed his duties. According to his mother's talent manager, Lolit Solis, Revilla had been suffering from depression. He said in an interview with Startalk that it was a "simple, pure accident."

=== Interview slip-up ===
During a game in the Maharlika Pilipinas Basketball League taking place in Strike Gymnasium, Revilla, in a TV interview, thanked the people who came in to watch the game. A short slip-up occurred when he stated, "Tama 'yang ginagawa ninyo. Bola muna bago droga. (What you're doing is right. Ball first before drugs.)" However, he quickly corrected himself, stating, "Actually, bola, hindi droga. (Actually, ball instead of drugs.)"

== Electoral history ==
Electoral history of Jolo Revilla
Year	Office	Party		Votes received				Result
Year	Office	Local	National	Total	%	P.	Swing	Result
2013	Vice Governor of Cavite	Magdalo	Lakas	449,849	54.67%	1st	—N/a	Won
2016	Vice Governor of Cavite	Magdalo	Lakas	938,096	81.67%	1st	+27.00	Won
2019	Vice Governor of Cavite	Magdalo	NPC	1,036,806	100.00%	1st	+18.33	Unopposed
2022	Representative (Cavite–1st)	Magdalo	Lakas	101,809	52.33%	1st	—N/a	Won
2025	Representative (Cavite–1st)	Magdalo	Lakas	147,263	77.93%	1st	+25.60	Won

== Filmography ==
=== Film ===
Year	Title	Role	Notes
1999	Pepeng Agimat	Jepoy	
2002	Agimat: Ang Anting-Anting ni Lolo	Pao	
2003	Bertud ng Putik	Putik	
2005	Exodus: Tales from the Enchanted Kingdom	Exodus	
2007	Resiklo	Ice	
2012	Si Agimat, si Enteng Kabisote at si Ako	Makisig	
2018	War on Drugs	Fernan	
2018	Tres	Marius Reyes	

=== Television ===
Year	Title	Role	Notes
2001–2009	SOP (Sobrang Okay Pare!)	Himself/Co-host	
2001–2003	Idol Ko Si Kap	Himself	
2003–2004	Click	Joma	
2005–2007	HP: To the Highest Level Na!	Joko	
2008	Sine Novela: Kaputol ng Isang Awit	Marco Salcelo	Main role
2009	Totoy Bato	Andong	Recurring role
2009–2010	ASAP 09	Himself (performer/host)	
2009–2010	Agimat: Ang Mga Alamat ni Ramon Revilla: Pepeng Agimat	Pepe "Pepeng Agimat" Dimaanta Jr.	Main role
2010–2012	ASAP	Himself (performer)	
2010	Maalaala Mo Kaya	Paco	Episode "Gitara"
2010–2011	Noah	Levi Aragon	Main Role
2011	Agimat: Ang Mga Alamat ni Ramon Revilla: Kapitan Inggo	Eugene "Inggo" Salazar	Main Role
2011	Gandang Gabi, Vice!	Himself	Guest
2011–2012	My Binondo Girl	Onyx Dimalanta	Main role
2013	Little Champ	Gio Suarez	Special participation
2013	Indio	Andres Bonifacio	Guest role
2018	FPJ's Ang Probinsyano	PSG Commander Harold Casilag	Mainrole
