= Justiniano Montano =

Filipino lawyer and politician (1905–2005)

The Honorable Justiniano Montano
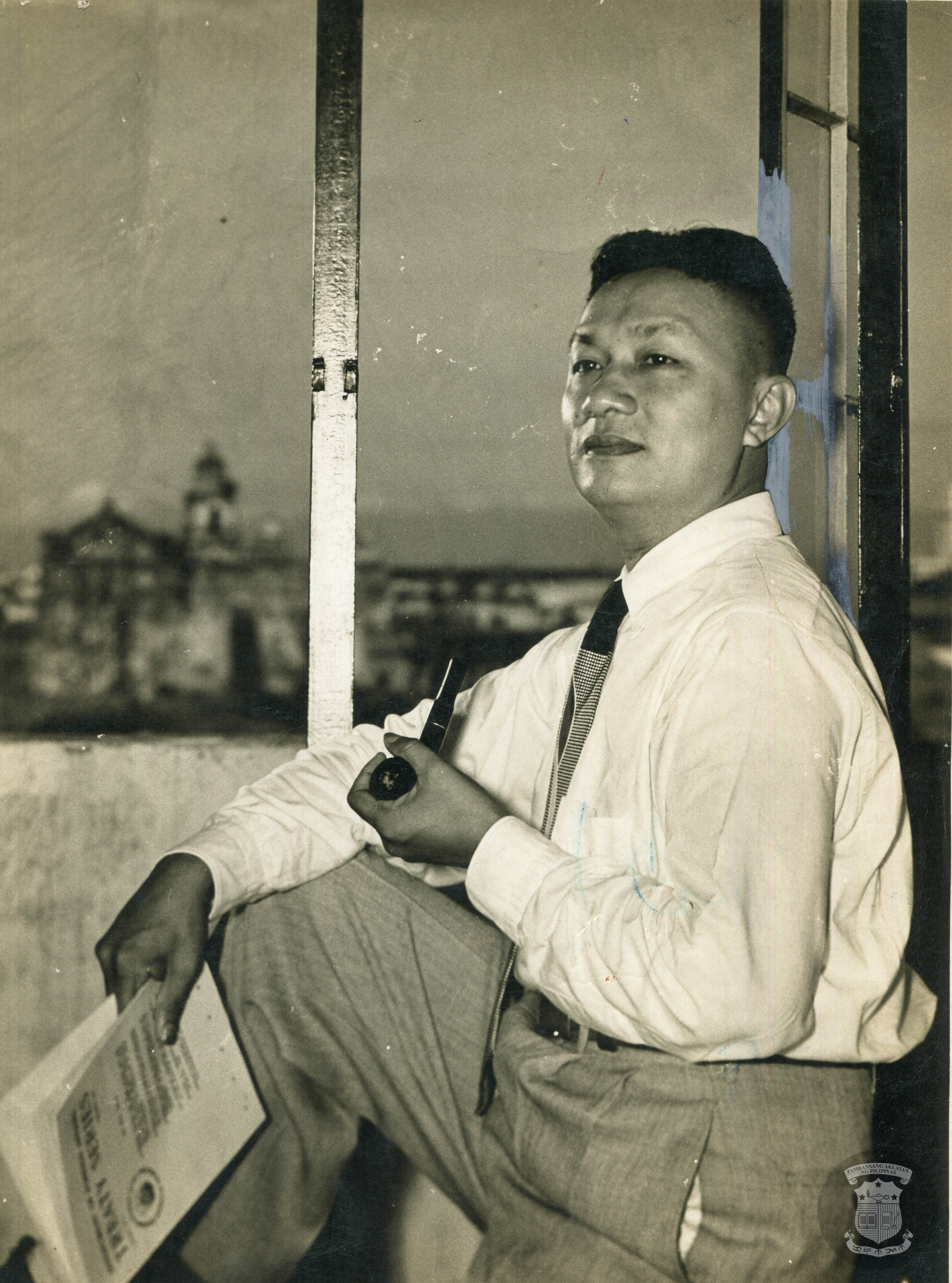
- Montano in 1950

Senator of the Philippines
- In office December 30, 1949 – December 30, 1955

Member of the Philippine House of Representatives from Cavite's Lone District
- In office December 30, 1957 – September 23, 1972 (Note: President Ferdinand Marcos declared Martial Law in 1972 which resulted Congress was dissolved.)
- Preceded by: José Cajulis
- Succeeded by: Post dissolved (Note: After the Marcos regime, Cavite was divided into three districts.)
- In office June 9, 1945 – December 30, 1949
- Preceded by: District recreated
- Succeeded by: Manuel Rojas

Member of the National Assembly from Cavite's Lone District
- In office September 16, 1935 – October 11, 1939 (Note: Election annulled after an election protest)
- Preceded by: Francisco Arca
- Succeeded by: Manuel Rojas

Majority Floor Leader of the House of Representatives of the Philippines
- In office January 22, 1962 – February 2, 1967
- Preceded by: Jose Aldeguer
- Succeeded by: Marcelino Veloso

Minority Floor Leader of the House of Representatives of the Philippines
- In office January 26, 1970 – June 12, 1971
- Preceded by: Jose B. Laurel Jr.
- Succeeded by: Ramon Mitra Jr.

Mayor of Cavite City
- In office 1942–1944

Personal details
- Born: Justiniano Solis Montano; September 5, 1905 Santa Cruz de Malabon, Cavite, Insular Government of the Philippine Islands, U.S.
- Died: March 31, 2005 (aged 99) Manila, Philippines
- Party: Liberal (1949–1955; 1969–2005)
- Other political affiliations: Nacionalista (1935–1949; 1955–1969)
- Spouse: Ligaya Nazareno
- Children: 7
- Education: University of the Philippines

Justiniano Solis Montano Sr. (Tagalog: [hustinˈjano soˈlis mɔnˈtɐnɔ]; September 5, 1905 – March 31, 2005) was a Filipino lawyer and politician who was elected for one term to the Philippine Senate and for multiple terms as a member of the House of Representatives.

== Early life and education ==
Montano was born in Amaya, Santa Cruz de Malabon (now Tanza), Cavite to Julian Tacsuan Montano Sr. and Irene Fojas Solis. He obtained his Bachelor of Laws at the University of the Philippines College of Law, garnering a rare 100% bar rating in civil law. He placed second in the bar examinations held in 1929.

== Political career ==
Montano was appointed as deputy fiscal of Cavite from 1930 to 1932. In 1934, Montano made his first entry into politics, unsuccessfully running for governor of Cavite. In elections for the Commonwealth National Assembly, he was tapped by Manuel Quezon to run as Cavite's representative for the Nacionalista Party to diminish support for the province's native son Emilio Aguinaldo, who was running against Quezon for president in the 1935 elections. Montano defeated Aguinaldo's candidate, Emiliano Tria Tirona, and reduced Aguinaldo's lead in Cavite to 5,000 votes, ensuring Quezon's landslide victory in the rest of the country. Montano himself survived a post-election ambush by suspected Aguinaldo supporters.

Montano was reelected to the National Assembly in 1938 but resigned the following year due to an election protest. During the Second World War, he was appointed mayor of Cavite City by the Japanese occupation authorities but provided discreet logistical support to the guerrilla movement before resigning from office in 1944. After Liberation, Montano was elected to Congress representing Cavite in 1946, and served in non-successive terms in the post until 1972. As a lawmaker, he authored and sponsored Act. No. 32, better known as the “Montano Law” which provides confiscation of vast haciendas in Cavite and their partitioning among their tenants. He also sponsored Republic Act No. 981, which transferred the capital of Cavite from Cavite City to Trece Martires, formerly a barrio of Tanza largely owned by Montano's family.

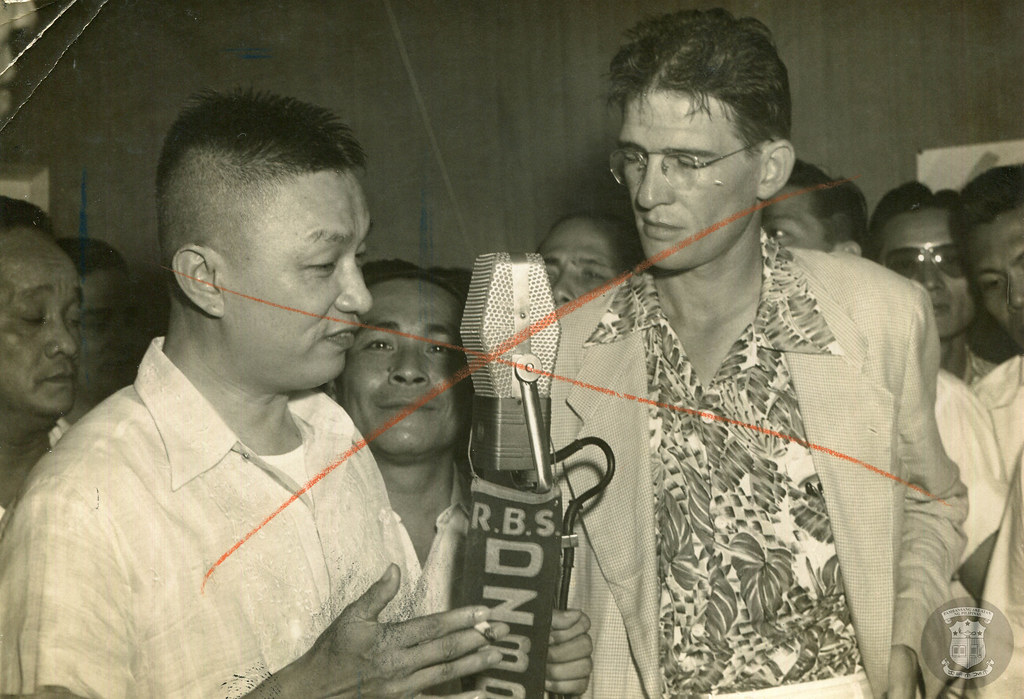
Montano (left) is interviewed by Robert "Uncle Bob" Stewart (right)

In 1949, Montano won a seat in the Philippine Senate and authored the resolution creating the Blue Ribbon Committee, tasked with investigating graft and corruption. He chaired the Committees on Labor and Immigration and on Provincial and Municipal Governments and Cities. Montano was also a member of the Commission on Appointments and the Senate Electoral Tribunal.

During this time, Montano was implicated in political violence in Cavite, particularly involving his feud with governor Dominador Camerino. To counter acts of intimidation and electoral violence by Camerino supporters, Montano built his own armed force, and was personally involved in a clash with police led by Maragondon mayor Patrocinio Gulapa, a Camerino supporter, during the 1947 elections. Montano was also accused of involvement in the Maragondon Massacre in 1952, during which Gulapa's successor Severino Rillo, Maragondon's police chief and several officers were killed by bandit Leonardo Manecio alias Nardong Putik, who was said to be acting on Montano's behalf. Montano was arrested but later acquitted of the crime.

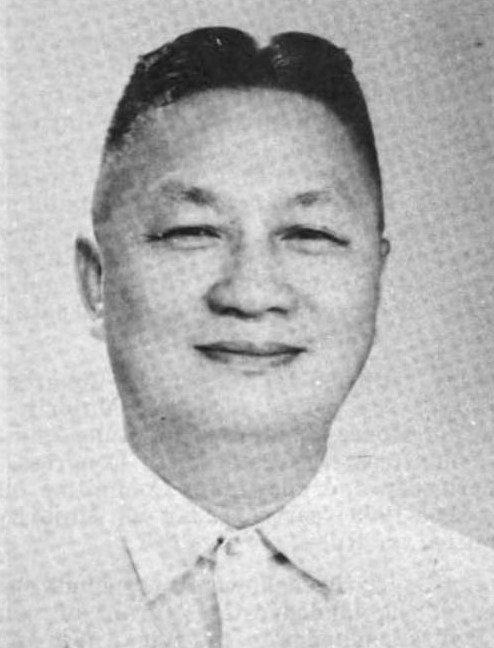
Montano official portrait during the 6th Congress.

Montano returned to the House of Representatives after his Senate term expired in 1955. During the 5th and 6th Congress, he served as majority floor leader, while he served as minority floor leader during the early part of the 7th Congress, and was cited for his perfect attendance record. In the 1960s, Montano was also accused of involvement in smuggling imported cigarettes and other goods in Cavite, for which he later feuded with Ferdinand Marcos, Floro Crisologo and other Ilocano politicians and members of the tobacco lobby. Marcos, as president, later engineered Montano's ouster as House minority leader.

Montano's political career ended when Congress was abolished by President Marcos after the declaration of martial law in 1972. Montano, who was in the United States at the time, stayed in exile until Marcos' overthrow in 1986, and withdrew from politics even after his return to the Philippines.

== Personal life ==
Montano was married to Ligaya Nazareno and had seven children. One of his sons, Delfin Montano, served as governor of Cavite from 1956 to 1971, while his youngest son, Justiniano Jr., became chair of the Games and Amusements Board.

== Death ==
Montano died on March 31, 2005, at the age of 99, being the oldest surviving former Filipino senator at the time.
