= Dominador Camerino =

Filipino politician (1899–1979)

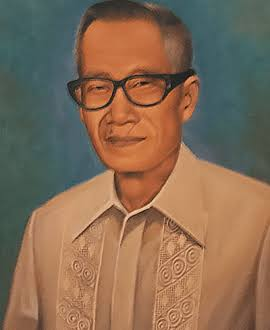
- Official portrait

18th, 22nd and 28th Governor of Cavite
- In office October 1, 1972 – July 24, 1979
- Vice Governor: Johnny Remulla
- Preceded by: Lino Bocalan
- Succeeded by: Johnny Remulla
- In office December 30, 1947 – April 20, 1954
- Preceded by: Francisco T. Arca
- Succeeded by: Mariano B. Villanueva
- In office December 1944 – February 3, 1945
- Preceded by: Mariano Castañeda
- Succeeded by: Mariano Castañeda

Vice Governor of Cavite
- In office December 30, 1971 – October 1, 1972
- Governor: Lino Bocalan

Mayor of Imus
- In office December 30, 1963 – December 30, 1971
- In office 1931–1941

Barrio Captain of Medicion, Imus
- In office 1928–1931

Personal details
- Born: November 1, 1899 Imus, Cavite, First Philippine Republic
- Died: July 24, 1979 (aged 79) Cavite, Philippines
- Party: Nacionalista (1957–1979)
- Other political affiliations: Liberal (1947–1957)
- Spouse: Tomasa Cuello (1915 – d.1965)
- Children: Leonida Camerino; Lourdes Camerino; Rosa Camerino

Dominador “Tango” Monzon Camerino (November 1, 1899 – July 24, 1979) was a Filipino politician who served as one of the longest sitting governors of Cavite, having been elected at least two times throughout his political career, as well as succeeding numerous governors after their abrupt suspensions. His political career was marked as one of the most violent periods in the history of Cavite, which was at its height during the years of 1946–1955 in a bloody struggle with his long-time rival Justiniano Montano.

Camerino entered politics in 1928, starting as a barrio captain, until his election as Mayor of Imus. After World War II, he became governor, backing numerous presidential candidates under the Liberal Party during elections, resulting in an intense struggle with Montano and his supporters. Following his downfall in 1954 after his suspension as governor, he received backing from Nacionalista Party presidential candidate Ferdinand Marcos which helped defeat his rival Montano in 1971, becoming elected as vice governor along with Lino Bocalan as governor. He then became governor for the last time in 1972, days after the Proclamation of Martial Law, until his death on July 24, 1979.

== Early life and education ==
Dominador Monzon Camerino was born on November 1, 1899 in Barrio Kaytobong, then a part of Imus but now of Dasmariñas, to a poor couple, Ciriaco Camerino and Agripina Monzon. He studied in the Medicion Elementary School in 1907 but dropped out four years later, only finishing fourth-grade education.

== Political career ==
=== Early career ===
Camerino first started his career as a barrio captain of Medicion in Imus from 1928 to 1931, when Camerino was elected as mayor of Imus, serving the position until 1941. During the Japanese occupation, he would remain as a provincial board member until December 1944 when he became governor after the previous governor Mariano Castañeda fled to the hills to lead the anti-Japanese resistance in Cavite. Camerino's adviser during this time as governor was Yoshiaki Muto, who was also the interpreter for General Masaharu Homma, and was responsible for saving the lives of many Filipinos from Japanese persecution. After the liberation in February 1945, Camerino was displaced by Castañeda.

=== Governor of Cavite ===
In 1946, Camerino, with his remaining influence backed the Liberal Party candidate Manuel Roxas, giving him a 27,000 vote margin. This ensured Roxas’ support of Camerino, which culminated in Camerino's victory in the 1947 elections. This period was suspected to be the beginning of Camerino's frequent use of armed men to gain an advantage over his political opponents. After being elected, he allegedly released several highway robbers and other outlaws who were jailed shortly after the liberation. In 1949, he backed Liberal Party candidate Elpidio Quirino in the elections, which contributed greatly to Quirino's candidacy, giving him a 39,000 vote margin. As a result, Quirino backed Camerino's reelection in 1951, in which Camerino would win.

His second reinstatement as governor since the Second World War oversaw the culmination of a long rivalry with Justiniano Montano, a congressman and warlord. This rivalry would result in the deaths of four town mayors, including Mayor Severino Rillo of Maragondon and the Philippine Constabulary provincial commander Lt. Colonel Laureano Maraña in what was called the Maragondon Massacre of 1952. Montano was implicated in ordering Nardong Putik to kill due to his rivalry with Camerino. Camerino meanwhile took control of Cavite City, near the US Naval Station Sangley Point, in order to curb Montano's influence in the city, placing his allies such as the Rojas family into the position.

On January 1, 1953, an assassination attempt was made on Camerino's life at the Lyric Theater in Manila while watching a movie by Crispulo Colmenar, who was caught after being wounded by a bodyguard. President Quirino called Camerino a day after as he was recovering in the Philippine General Hospital, making statements deploring the political violence in Cavite resulting in the assassination attempt.

=== Murder of Jacinto Morales and initial downfall ===
On November 10, 1953 during the election day, in retaliation to the death of Camerino's long-time ally vice-mayor Eduardo Ocampo of Bacoor, who was killed by sympathizers of the Nacionalista Party, a group of armed men fired at the house of Zoilo Morales, killing his son Jacinto. The prosecution implicated Camerino as a principal for the murder of Jacinto. Additionally, Camerino was also suspected to have had armed men under him patrolling around various villages in Cavite, whose men warned the locals to “stay home if they want to remain alive”, to interrupt the presidential elections to guarantee Quirino's reelection as president. However, the Supreme Court found no sufficient evidence to conclude that Camerino was involved in the crime and was acquitted on June 26, 1954 and affirmed 5 years later in 1959.

However, these allegations damaged Camerino's reputation to the national government, while already being unfavored due to the national government's transition into becoming dominated by the Nacionalista Party, and fell out of favor. As a result, Camerino was suspended by President Ramon Magsaysay on April 20, 1954, as well as placing 10 municipalities in Cavite under direct Constabulary control. This effectively empowered Justiniano Montano, senator and Magsaysay's ally, into becoming the most powerful man in Cavite. Camerino was replaced by acting governors Mariano Villanueva, Horacio Rodriguez and Dominador Mangubat respectively. He ran for governorship again in 1955 but lost to Delfin Montano, son of his rival Justiniano Montano.

=== Alliance with Carlos P. Garcia and Ferdinand Marcos ===
After the death of Magsaysay on March 17, 1957, he was succeeded by Carlos P. Garcia, who showed compassion for Camerino and pardoned him for his suspected involvement in the electoral violence of 1953. On August 29 of the same year, President Garcia swore in Camerino and about 5,000 members of his faction, including seven municipal mayors, as members of the Nacionalista Party. In 1963, Dominador Camerino would officially return to politics after winning the mayoral elections in Imus.

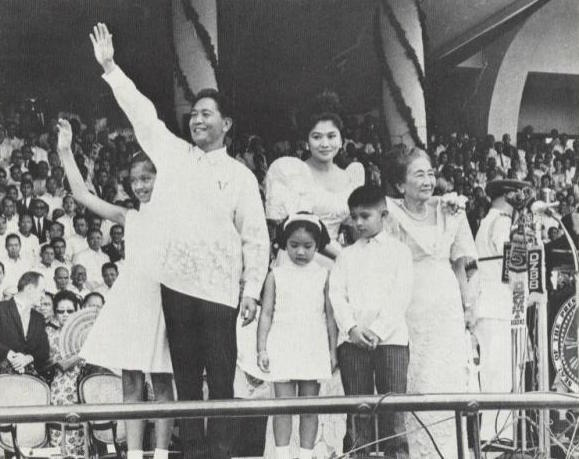
An image of Ferdinand Marcos after his inauguration as president, December 30, 1965.

With Ferdinand Marcos’ election as president on December 30, 1965, he made considerable efforts to curb the influence of Justiniano Montano in Cavite by supporting his rivals including Camerino in the 1967 and 1969 elections. Montano’s henchmen were prohibited by the Marcos government to possess firearms but secretly allowed Camerino’s henchmen to possess firearms, resulting in an intense struggle during the era. This event seriously weakened Montano’s position in Cavite, causing the defection of prominent businessman and tobacco smuggler Lino Bocalan by 1971 from Montano to Marcos, who supported Bocalan to victory in the gubernatorial elections of the same year as well as the return of Camerino to power, who was Bocalan’s running mate as his vice governor.

On April 25, 1972, Cavite Vice Governor Dominador Camerino left his sickbed at the Makati Medical Center to take up the peace and order situation in his province and to renew his request for the release of funds for the repair of roads damaged by a series of typhoons.

=== Return to governorship and death ===
After a series of political events leading to the arrest of Governor Lino Bocalan on September 24, 1972 following Ferdinand Marcos’ declaration of martial law, Vice Governor Camerino was reinstated as acting governor of Cavite on October 1, of the same year. In an attempt to remove Montano's hold over Cavite, Ferdinand Marcos issued Presidential Decree No. 1163, which transferred the provincial capital of Cavite from Trece Martires to Imus City, which was the hometown and bailiwick of Camerino. However, most government offices up to the present period are currently located in Trece Martires.

In Camerino's last term as governor, the tax collection of the province rose steadily from ₱3,000,000 to ₱7,000,000, which was an increase of more than 130 percent. Camerino also provided electric power to upland towns through the CEDA (Cavite Electric Development Authority), which encouraged animal, crop and fish production. Camerino also prepared the Cavite Integrated Area Development Plan, as well as pushing through the construction of the municipal buildings of Tanza, General Emilio Aguinaldo, Mendez, Alfonso, Amadeo as well as a two-story municipal hall in his hometown of Imus. Camerino also supported and promoted the Barangay Development Program.

Following his death on July 24, 1979, he was succeeded a few months later by Vice Governor Juanito Remulla Sr., a Montano ally and a Marcos loyalist.

== Legacy ==
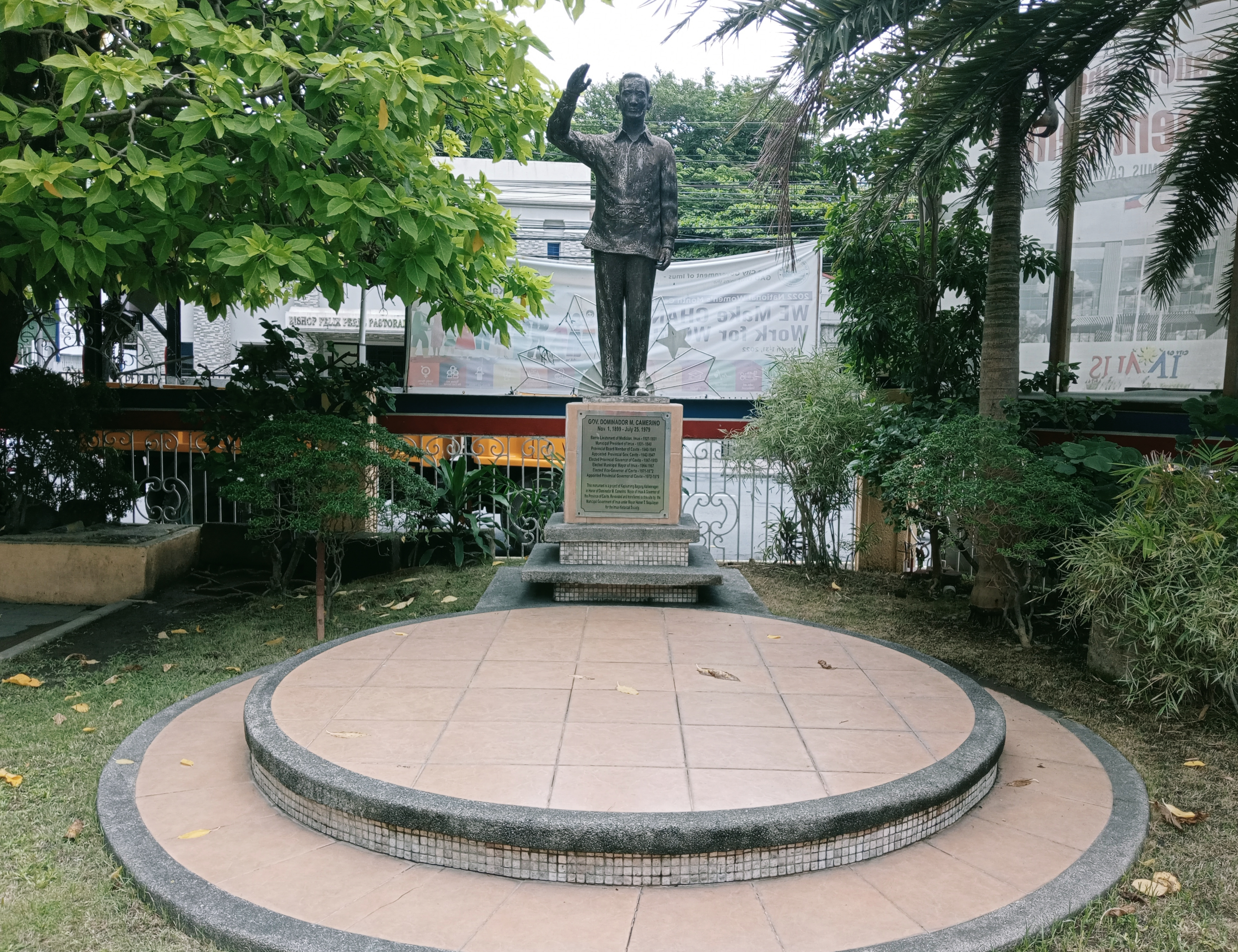
A monument dedicated to Dominador Camerino in the Municipal Hall of Imus City.

In honor of Camerino's political service as governor of Cavite, the Medicion Primary School was renamed as the Gov. D.M. Camerino Elementary School via Republic Act No. 6711 on February 10, 1989, currently situated in Imus City. Additionally, during the term of Homer Saquilayan as City Mayor, two monuments dedicated to Camerino previously made by the Kapisanang Bagong Kaliwanagan were transferred to the municipal hall of Imus.

== Personal life ==
He was barely 16 when he was married to a barrio lass, Tomasa Cuello, by whom he begot three children; namely, Leonida, Lourdes, who died in infancy, and Rosa. However, Tomasa died in 1965. Camerino was a descendant of the 19th century bandit Casimiro Camerino, as well as revolutionary Colonel Lucas Camerino.

== In popular culture ==
On August 29, 1978, a movie titled 'Camerino' was released on the cinemas, which starred famous actor Ramon Revilla Sr., who was the main character of the film.
