= Johnny Remulla =

Filipino lawyer and politician (1933–2014)

The Honorable Johnny Remulla
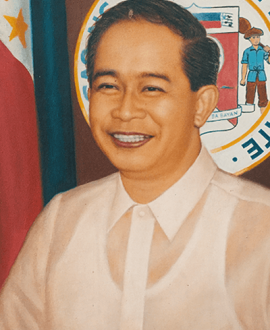

29th and 31st Governor of Cavite
- In office February 2, 1988 – June 30, 1995
- Vice Governor: Luis S. Ferrer III (1988–1992); Danilo Lara (1992–1995)
- Preceded by: Fernando C. Campos
- Succeeded by: Epimaco Velasco
- In office September 24, 1979 – February 19, 1986
- Preceded by: Dominador Camerino
- Succeeded by: Fernando C. Campos

Vice Governor of Cavite
- In office 1972 – July 24, 1979
- Governor: Dominador Camerino (acting)
- Preceded by: Dominador Camerino

Delegate of the 1971 Constitutional Convention
- In office June 1, 1971 – December 30, 1971

Member of the Cavite Provincial Board
- In office 1964–1970

Personal details
- Born: Juanito Reyes Remulla; April 14, 1933 Imus, Cavite, Insular Government of the Philippine Islands, U.S.
- Died: December 29, 2014 (aged 81) Muntinlupa, Philippines
- Party: Magdalo (1986–2014)
- Other political affiliations: NPC (1992–1995); KBL (1978–1986); Liberal (until 1978)
- Spouse: Ditas Catibayan
- Children: 7 (including Jesus Crispin/Boying, Juanito Victor, Jr./Jonvic, and Gilbert)
- Education: University of the Philippines Diliman (LL.B)
- Occupation: Politician
- Profession: Lawyer

Juanito "Johnny" Reyes Remulla Sr. (Tagalog: [hwɐˈnitɔ rɛˈmuljɐ]; April 14, 1933 – December 29, 2014) was a Filipino lawyer and politician who served as the longest sitting governor of Cavite from 1979 to 1986 and from 1988 to 1995. He also served as presidential adviser on local government during the Estrada administration.

In 2026, his son Jonvic Remulla admitted that he nearly hired a contract killer to target political activist Ronald Llamas.

== Early life and education ==
Remulla was born on April 14, 1933, in Toclong, Imus, Cavite to Crispin and Teofista (née Reyes) Remulla. He was a valedictorian in the Medicion Elementary School in Imus and first honorable mention in the high school department of the Francisco Law College. He landed fourth in the 1956 Bar examinations after graduating from the College of Law in the University of the Philippines. While there, he was a member of Upsilon Sigma Phi.

== Legal career ==
Remulla was a lawyer and a business executive before he entered the government service. He was the senior partner in the Remulla, Estrella & Associates Law Office and the chairman of the board of Covelandia Island Resort in Binakayan in Kawit, Cavite at the same time. Owing to his brilliant scholastic record, Remulla was chosen awardee of the Colombo Plan Scholarship, Institute of Local Government, in Birmingham, England (1966–67).

In May 1958, Remulla assisted Marikina banker Romeo Liamzon and his girlfriend in holding a secret marriage ceremony in Imus, Cavite, where he signed an affidavit falsely claiming Liamzon to be a resident of Imus; a court case between Liamzon and his partner later found no records of a marriage license being issued.

== Political career ==
=== Acting Governor and delegate to the 1971 Constitutional Convention ===
He was appointed as acting governor in 1964 and 1965. His two brief stints in the executive office must have so impressed the Caviteños that in the election of delegates to the 1971 Constitutional Convention. Remulla, 38, the youngest candidate, garnered the highest number of votes, besting his three more senior and experienced colleagues. Remulla was already a member of the provincial board and elected to the provincial board in 1972, he became vice governor the same year.

=== Governor of Cavite ===
Two months after the death of Dominador Camerino on July 24, 1979, he became the last appointed governor of Cavite on September 25. Finally, in the election for governor on January 30, 1980, Remulla, the KBL candidate, obtained an overwhelming majority over his Nacionalista opponent, Fernando Campos. As a Marcos ally, he was forced to resign during the early days of the Corazon Aquino administration. In 1988, he was re-elected as Governor until 1995, when he was defeated by Epimaco Velasco, the outgoing director of the National Bureau of Investigation.

=== Presidential adviser ===
In 1998, Remulla was appointed by President Joseph Estrada to be his Presidential Adviser on Local Government.

== Personal life ==
He married Ditas Catibayan and had seven children, including Jesus Crispin (also known as Boying), former Secretary of Justice; Gilbert, a former representative; and Juanito Victor or Jonvic, the incumbent Secretary of the Interior and Local Government. One of his grandchildren is incumbent representative Crispin Diego, and one of his great-grandchildren is singer and beauty queen Dia Maté.

=== Death ===
He died on December 29, 2014, aged 81, from multiple organ failure.

== Legacy ==
On June 29, 2018, Governor's Drive, a highway in Cavite, was renamed as Governor Juanito R. Remulla Sr. Road in his honor, by virtue of Republic Act No. 11047,.
