= Mariano Castañeda =

Filipino military governor

Military Governor of Cavite
- In office 1944–1944
- Preceded by: Luis Y. Ferrer Jr.
- Succeeded by: Dominador Camerino
- In office 1945–1945
- Preceded by: Dominador M. Camerino
- Succeeded by: Rafael F. Trias

Chief of Staff of the Armed Forces of the Philippines
- In office December 21, 1948 – May 28, 1951
- President: Elpidio Quirino; Manuel A. Roxas
- Preceded by: Rafael Jalandoni
- Succeeded by: Calixto Duque

Vice Chief of the Armed Forces of the Philippines
- In office 1946–1948
- President: Manuel Roxas
- Preceded by: Brig. Gen. Vicente Lim
- Succeeded by: Brig. Gen. Jesus Vargas

Provost Marshal General Army and Commander Constabulary Division
- In office 1946–1948
- President: Manuel A. Roxas
- Preceded by: Brig. Gen. Federico Oboza
- Succeeded by: Brig. Gen. Alberto Ramos

Personal details
- Born: Mariano Numeriano Monzon Castañeda; 20 December 1892 Imus, Cavite, Captaincy General of the Philippines
- Died: 8 September 1970 (aged 77) Makati City, Philippines
- Awards: Philippine Medal of Valor

Military service
- Allegiance: Philippines
- Branch/service: Philippine Army Philippine Constabulary
- Rank: Major General
- Commands: Armed Forces of the Philippines Fil-American Cavite Guerilla Forces FACGF Philippine Constabulary1st Infantry Regiment (PC)
- Battles/wars: Pacific War, World War II/Liberation of the Province of Cavite

Mariano Numeriano Castañeda (20 December 1892 – 8 September 1970) was a Chief of Staff of the Armed Forces of the Philippines from 1948 to 1951 and also served as Military Governor of Cavite during World War II. He was a recipient the Philippines highest military award for courage, the Medal of Valor.

== Military education and WWII service ==
Castañeda graduated from the Philippine Military Academy on 15 November 1915, and from the Infantry School at Fort Benning, United States in 1940. He became President Manuel Quezon's aide-de-camp that same year and fought with the United States Army Forces in the Far East during the Battle of Bataan. He survived the Bataan Death March in 1942 and began organizing resistance against Imperial Japanese occupation, most notably the Fil-American Cavite Guerrilla Forces shortly thereafter. In 1944, the Japanese-controlled Second Philippine Republic appointed him Governor of Cavite. After seven months in office, the Japanese became aware of his guerrilla affiliation and attempted to arrest him; he was able to elude his would-be captors and joined his comrades in the field and he engineered along with his FACGF officers and in coordination with the US 11th Airborne Division General Swing and Col.Jay Vanderpool the battle for the liberation of the province of Cavite

== Post-WWII service ==
Castañeda was appointed Provost Marshal General of the Philippine Army on 1 June 1946. He became Chief of Staff of the Armed Forces of the Philippines two years later.

The night before the Philippine Parity Rights plebiscite in 1947, President Manuel Roxas addressed a rally at Plaza Miranda. He narrowly avoided an assassination attempt by Julio Guillen, a disgruntled barber who threw a grenade on the speaker's platform. José Avelino, the Senate President, saw the bomb and gave it a kick. Castañeda then kicked it further down a set of steps as he covered the President with his own body. The grenade exploded near the audience, killing two people and injuring others. Guillen was arrested and executed via the electric chair on 26 April 1950. Castañeda was conferred the Medal of Valor as a consequence of his actions that night.

== Death ==
Mariano Castañeda died in Makati City, Philippines at the age of 77 on 8 September 1970, leaving behind his wife and six children.
