= Gilbert Remulla =

Filipino journalist and politician (born 1970)

The Honorable Gilbert C. Remulla
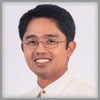
- Official portrait, 2004

Member of the Board of Directors of the Philippine Amusement and Gaming Corporation
- Incumbent
- Assumed office August 23, 2022

Member of the Philippine House of Representatives from Cavite's 2nd congressional district
- In office June 30, 2001 – June 30, 2007
- Preceded by: Ayong Maliksi
- Succeeded by: Elpidio Barzaga Jr.

Personal details
- Born: Gilbert Cesar Catibayan Remulla; September 5, 1970 (age 56) Makati, Philippines
- Party: Nacionalista (2004–present); Magdalo (local party; 2001–present)
- Other political affiliations: LDP (2001–2004)
- Spouse: Georgia Isabel Roa (m. 2000)
- Children: 3
- Parent: Juanito Remulla Sr. (father)
- Relatives: Jesus Crispin Remulla (brother); Jonvic Remulla (brother); Crispin Diego Remulla (nephew); Abeng Remulla (nephew); Dia Maté (great-niece)
- Education: University of the Philippines Diliman (BA); Columbia University (MA)
- Occupation: Politician
- Profession: Journalist
- Website: www.gilbertremulla.com

Gilbert Cesar Catibayan Remulla (Tagalog pronunciation: [rɛˈmuljɐ]; born September 5, 1970) is a Filipino journalist and politician who currently serves as member of PAGCOR's board of directors since 2022. He served as the representative of the 2nd district of Cavite from 2001 to 2007.

== Biography ==
He is the seventh and youngest child of former Governor Johnny Remulla and Ditas Catibayan Remulla. His brothers include Interior Secretary Juanito Victor "Jonvic" Remulla and Ombudsman Jesus Crispin "Boying" Remulla. Gilbert spent his childhood in Bel-Air, Makati and Imus, Cavite.

He spent his elementary years in the now defunct De La Salle University Grade School, high school at the Ateneo de Manila and went to the University of the Philippines Diliman for his college education. He served as a National President of AIESEC, and was an active member of the Upsilon Sigma Phi fraternity.

== Broadcasting career ==
After obtaining a degree in Broadcast Communication in 1993, Remulla joined ABS-CBN as part of its news team. Remulla started as a production assistant, and then became a field reporter and a regular in the morning and evening news.

In 1997, Remulla took up his MA International Affairs with concentration in International Media and Communications at the Columbia University in New York City. His experience in the Ivy League school gave him the opportunity to work for CNN and the United Nations.

== Political career ==
Remulla successfully ran in the Congressional elections of May 2001 against his veteran rivals, joining fellow ABS-CBN co-anchor Ted Failon of Leyte. Being one of the youngest members of Congress of the Philippines, the time he has spent in office has been marked by comments about his relative youth in comparison to majority of the members of Congress. He was an author or co-author of the following laws - Republic Act 9165, or the Dangerous Drugs Act of 2002, and Republic Act 9287, or the Act Increasing the Penalty for the Illegal Numbers Game. He has also authored House Bill No. 185 seeking the abolition of the Sangguniang Kabataan and replacing it with a youth representative; House Bill No. 2452 which seeks to lower the cost of cellular phone usage and House Bill No. 5310 which aims at minimizing the use of plastic bags and plastic utensils that damage the environment.

He was one of the members of so called Brat Pack led by NPC stalwart Chiz Escudero who have a failed attempt to impeach Hilario Davide Jr. in November 2003. He ran again in 2004 and won, but lost his reelection bid for his third and final term in 2007 to then-Dasmariñas mayor Elpidio Barzaga Jr.

On January 23, 2008, former Senate President Ernesto Maceda, chairman emeritus of United Opposition (UNO) announced that Remulla, UNO spokesman Adel Tamano, incumbent Bukidnon congressman Teofisto Guingona III, incumbent Senators Jinggoy Estrada and Jamby Madrigal are the 2010 senatorial bets of the opposition and "vice presidential materials.”

He ran for senator as a Nacionalista in the May 10, 2010, Senate election but lost. In 2013 he ran again for congressman, but this time in the 7th district due to his brother Boying is term limited and he ran for mayor of Tagaytay, under the Nacionalista banner, Lakas and the United Nationalist Alliance (UNA). He lost to then-Tagaytay Mayor Bambol Tolentino, a Liberal.

He was appointed as one of directors of PAGCOR's board of directors in 2022.

== Personal life ==
In New York City, Remulla met Georgia Isabel Roa, whom he married in Catholic rites in 2000. They have three daughters, Roxanne Margarita, Rocio Isabel and Reanna Gabriel.
