= Ayong Maliksi =

Filipino politician (1938–2021)

The Honorable Erineo S. Maliksi
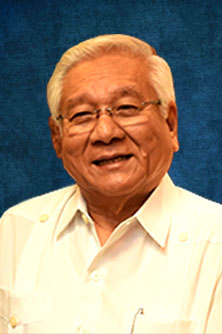
- Official portrait, 2015

Chairman of the Philippine Charity Sweepstakes Office
- In office April 23, 2015 – August 31, 2016
- Appointed by: Benigno Aquino III
- Preceded by: Margarita Juico
- Succeeded by: Jose Jorge Corpus

Member of the Philippine House of Representatives from Cavite
- In office June 30, 2010 – June 30, 2013
- Preceded by: Jesus Crispin Remulla
- Succeeded by: Alex Advincula
- Constituency: 3rd District
- In office June 30, 1998 – June 30, 2001
- Preceded by: Renato Dragon
- Succeeded by: Gilbert Remulla
- Constituency: 2nd District

34th Governor of Cavite
- In office June 30, 2001 – June 30, 2010
- Vice Governor: Jonvic Remulla (2001–2007); Dencito Campaña (2007–2010)
- Preceded by: Bong Revilla
- Succeeded by: Jonvic Remulla

Mayor of Imus, Cavite
- In office February 2, 1988 – 1998
- Preceded by: Wilfredo Garde (OIC)
- Succeeded by: Ricardo Paredes (acting)

Vice Mayor of Imus, Cavite
- In office March 3, 1980 – March 25, 1986
- Preceded by: Francisco Herrera
- Succeeded by: Pepito Camerino

Personal details
- Born: Erineo Saquilayan Maliksi; March 25, 1938 Imus, Cavite, Commonwealth of the Philippines
- Died: February 24, 2021 (aged 82) Imus, Cavite, Philippines
- Party: Liberal (2007–2016; 2018–2021); Magdalo (local party; 1986–2021)
- Other political affiliations: PDP–Laban (2016–2018); LAMMP (1998–2001); LDP (1988–2007); KBL (1980–1986)
- Spouse: Olivia Leonardo

Erineo "Ayong" Saquilayan Maliksi (March 25, 1938 – February 24, 2021) was a Filipino politician from the province of Cavite. As an elected official, he served in different capacities in the municipal government of Imus and the provincial government of Cavite. He represented the 2nd and 3rd congressional districts of Cavite in the 11th and 15th Congress of the Philippines, respectively.

After serving as a congressman in the House of Representatives, Maliksi was appointed by then-President Benigno Aquino III as the Chairman of the Philippine Charity Sweepstakes Office, serving the agency from April 2015 to August 2016.

== Education ==
Maliksi finished his elementary education at Anabu II Elementary School in Imus in 1951, whose old main building was replaced by a modern three-story building during his term as governor. He finished his secondary education at Del Pilar Academy, also in Imus, in 1955. In 1969, Maliksi graduated from University of the East, earning a bachelor's degree in political science.

== Political career ==
=== Vice Mayor of Imus (1980–1986) ===
Maliksi was first elected to public office as Vice Mayor of then municipality of Imus, Cavite, where he served for two consecutive terms from 1980 to 1986.

=== Mayor of Imus (1988–1998) ===
After the EDSA Revolution, Maliksi was elected as Mayor of Imus, which he held from 1988 to 1998. During his term, Imus became well known as the "Christmas Capital of the Philippines," with its colorful lanterns, lights and nativity scenes (belen) during the yuletide season.

=== House of Representatives (1998–2001) ===
In 1998, Maliksi ran for the position of 2nd district Representative of Cavite, at the 11th Congress. Maliksi served a full 3-year term until 2001.

=== Governor of Cavite (2001–2010) ===
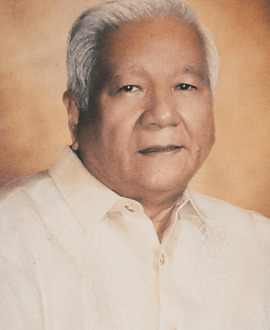
Official portrait of Maliksi as the Governor of Cavite.

By 2001, Maliksi ran an uphill gubernatorial race against first-term incumbent Ramon "Bong" Revilla Jr. Mostly known by many as an actor, Revilla also hailed from a highly respected political clan in Bacoor, Cavite. In 1995, Revilla was also elected as Vice-Governor of Cavite. With the appointment of then-Governor Epimaco Velasco as Secretary of Interior and Local Government, Revilla assumed the position of Governor. in 1998, he would run for the same position and eventually win.

Despite Revilla's popularity and his family's political background, Maliksi won against Revilla by a wide margin for the position of Governor.

Maliksi went on to serve two more terms until 2010.

=== Return to the House of Representatives (2010–2013) ===
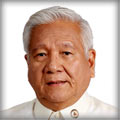
Portrait of Maliksi during his term as Cavite representative in the 15th Congress

In 2010, Maliksi ran and won as Representative of the redistricted 3rd district of Cavite, which covers only Imus. It was during this time that Imus became a chartered city, by virtue of Republic Act No. 10161. The passage of the law was initiated by Rep. Maliksi, who authored House Bill No. 4729, creating the City of Imus. With the eventual enactment into law and the ratification by its registered voters, the municipality of Imus was converted into a component city to be known as the City of Imus.

=== Gubernatorial run (2013) ===
In the 2013 Cavite local elections, Maliksi ran for Governor, challenging his successor Jonvic Remulla. Remulla was the running mate of Maliksi during the 2001 and 2004 elections. Remulla eventually broke ties with Maliksi after the 2004 elections, and then proceeded to file an administrative case against Maliksi. During the campaign, Remulla used the cases he filed to undermine Maliksi. The cases, which were eventually dismissed by the courts, negatively impacted the campaign of Maliksi. Remulla went on to win the election with a margin of over 50,000 votes.

=== Chairman of Philippine Charity Sweepstakes Office (2015–2016) ===
In 2015, President Benigno Aquino III appointed Maliksi as Chairman of the Philippine Charity Sweepstakes Office. Maliksi held the position until August 2016.

=== Gubernatorial run (2019) ===
In the 2019 Cavite local elections, Maliksi ran for Governor, but lost to Jonvic Remulla once again, this time by a landslide victory. He won in only three municipalities: Carmona, Maragondon, and Rosario.

== Personal life ==
Maliksi was married to Olivia Leonardo-Maliksi and was the father of former Imus City Mayor Emmanuel "Manny" Maliksi.

== Illness and death ==
Maliksi tested positive for COVID-19 on February 14, 2021, but later tested negative when he had a cardiac arrest. He suffered a COVID-19-induced stroke, according to his son Emmanuel, the then-mayor of Imus.

Maliksi died on February 24, 2021, at the age of 82. Governor Jonvic Remulla ordered flags at provincial government offices in Cavite to be flown half mast in mourning of his death.

Political offices
Preceded by Francisco Herrera	Vice Mayor of Imus; 1980–1986	Succeeded by Pepito Camerino
Preceded by Wilfredo Garde (OIC)	Mayor of Imus; 1988–1998	Succeeded by Ricardo Paredes (acting)
Preceded by Bong Revilla	Governor of Cavite; 2001–2010	Succeeded by Jonvic Remulla
House of Representatives of the Philippines
Preceded by Renato Dragon	Representative, 2nd District of Cavite; 1998–2001	Succeeded by Gilbert Remulla
Preceded by Jesus Crispin Remulla	Representative, 3rd District of Cavite; 2010–2013	Succeeded by Alex Advincula
Government offices
Preceded by Margarita Juico	PCSO Chairman; 2015–2016	Succeeded by Jose Jorge Corpus
