= Partido Magdalo =

Political party in the Philippines founded in 1986

- Chairman: Jonvic Remulla
- Founder: Johnny Remulla
- Founded: 1986
- Headquarters: Imus, Cavite
- Ideology: Conservatism; Social conservatism Populism
- Political position: Centre-right
- National affiliation: UNA (until 2015); PMP; Lakas; Nacionalista (2010); NPC; PDP–Laban; NUP; PFP
- Colors: Red and blue

Partido Magdalo is one of the political parties in the Philippines founded by former Cavite Governor Juanito "Johnny" Remulla Sr. and former Congressman Renato P. Dragon. It is a local political party in Cavite. The new leaders of this party are former Governors of Cavite Juanito Victor "Jonvic" Remulla, Jr. and Jesus "Boying" Remulla.

The name derives from the pseudonym of Emilio Aguinaldo as a Katipunan member as well as of its council for town of Kawit during the Philippine Revolution, Aguinaldo having been born and raised in the town, called Cavite el Viejo during Spanish times.

== Notable members ==
Many of notable members and politicians are the following:

- President: former Governor Juanito Victor C. Remulla, Jr.
- Secretary: former City Mayor Homer T. Saquilayan (Imus)
- Members
  - Congress
  - Representative Ramon Jolo Revilla III 1st District of Cavite
  - Representative Lani Mercado-Revilla 2nd District of Cavite
  - Representative Roy Loyola 5th District of Cavite
  - Cities and Municipalities
  - Mayor Strike Revilla (Bacoor)
  - Mayor Yuri A. Pacumio (Tanza)
  - Mayor Benjarde A. Villanueva (Amadeo)
  - Mayor Dahlia A. Loyola (Carmona)
  - Mayor Melandres G. de Sagun (Trece Martires)
  - Mayor Gemma Buendia-Lubigan (Trece Martires)
  - Mayor Junio C. Dualan, Sr. (Naic)
  - Mayor Bernardo S. Paredes, Sr. (Cavite City)
  - Mayor Enrico M. Alvarez (Noveleta)
  - Mayor Emila Lourdes F. Poblete (Silang)
  - Mayor Virgilio P. Varias (Alfonso)
  - Mayor Danilo M. Bencito (Bailen)
  - Mayor Edwin V. Sisante (Magallanes)
  - Mayor Herminio Lindo (Ternate)
  - Mayor Fredrick A. Vida (Mendez)
  - Mayor Bienvenido V. Dimero (Indang)
  - Vice Mayor Raymundo Del Rosario (Tanza)
  - Vice Mayor Armando Bernal (Kawit)
  - Vice Mayor Jose Rozel Hernandez (Rosario)
  - Former Vice Mayor Percival Cabuhat (General Mariano Alvarez)
  - City Councilor Jeffrey Asistio (Imus)
  - City Councilor Edgardo T. Saquilayan (Imus)
  - Vice Mayor Maurito C. Sison(General Trias)
  - City Councilor Jacinto Frani Jr. (Dasmarinas)
- The Sangguniang Panlalawigan of Cavite (2013-2016) is composed of twelve (8) Partido Magdalo Members:
  - Hon. Dino Carlo R. Chua (Majority Leader) - 1st District/
  - Hon. Ryan R. Enriquez - 1st District/
  - Hon. Edralin G. Gawaran - 2nd District/
  - Hon. Rolando S. Remulla - 2nd District/
  - Hon. Marcos C. Amutan - 5th District/
  - Hon. Ivee Jayne A. Reyes - 5th District/
  - Hon. Hermogenes Arayta III - 6th District/
  - Hon. Irene D.P. Bencito - 7th District/
  - Hon. Mark Joseph T. Mupas - PCL President/
  - Hon. Gloria Fernandez - ABC President/

== Party performances in local elections ==
2010

Province of Cavite was divided into seven Congressional Districts. (originally 3 Districts) Partido Magdalo reclaimed its glory by winning the seat of power at the Provincial Capitol upon the victory of Governor Juanito Victor Remulla, Jr., son of former governor Juanito Remulla, founder of the party. In Imus, Partido Magdalo also became victorious after Mayor Homer T. Saquilayan was elected against re-electionist mayor Emmanuel Maliksi by a wide margin. In the following weeks, Maliksi filed an electoral protest and was declared by the Imus Regional Trial Court the winner by 665 votes in 2011. However, on March 12, 2013, he was declared by the Supreme Court the true winner, he took his oath six days later on March 18. On April 11, it reversed its ruling and remanded the case back to the COMELEC.

The Sangguniang Panlalawigan of Cavite (2010-2013) is composed of Partido Magdalo Members:

Hon. Dino Carlo R. Chua (Senior Board Member) - 1st District/ Hon. Cecille Miranda (Majority Floor Leader) - ABC President/ Hon. Marcos Amutan - 5th District/ Hon. Irene Bencito - 7th District / Hon. Maurito Sison - PCL President/

2013

In 2012, Liga ng mga Barangay Pres. Jolo Revilla agreed to team up with Gov. Remulla, to aim to defeat the Aquino-backed Rep. Ayong Maliksi and Vice-Governor Recto Cantimbuhan, which he dropped by the Liberals and replaced by Ronald Jay Lacson, son of Sen. Panfilo Lacson. Remulla was also join the Lakas–CMD party of Sen. Bong Revilla, and one of the opposition party. Remulla and Revilla won against Maliksi and Lacson. In the Congress only Lani Mercado-Revilla and Luis Ferrer IV won. In the provincial board 8 out of 14 seats won, which led by Dino Chua.

2016

2019

2022
