= Dasmariñas (disambiguation) =

Dasmariñas is a component city in the Philippines.

Dasmariñas or Dasmarinas may also refer to:

== Places ==
- Dasmarinas Estates, Alberta, a community in Strathcona County, Alberta
- Dasmariñas Bagong Bayan, a resettlement area located in Dasmariñas, Philippines
- Dasmariñas, Makati, a barangay and gated subdivision in Makati, Philippines

== People ==
- Gómez Pérez Dasmariñas, the 8th Spanish Governor-General of the Philippines
- Luis Pérez Dasmariñas, the 9th Spanish Governor-General of the Philippines
- Michael Dasmariñas (born 1992), professional boxer
