= Kin Yang Academy =

Private school in Cavite, Philippines

Kin Yang Academy, Inc.
- Paaralan ng Kin Yang

Location
- 360-A Don Placido Campus Avenue, Sabang; Sabang; Dasmariñas, Cavite 4114; Philippines
- 14°21′10.5″N 120°55′25.9″E

Information
- School type: Nonsectarian private school
- Motto: Ad Majorem Dei Gloriam (Latin) ("To the greater glory of God")
- Established: February 2000
- Status: Active
- Director: Mr. Leodencio T. Obra
- Principal: Mr. Juancho Gutierrez (Elementary School) and Mrs. Reny C. Obra (High school)
- Grades: 1-6 (Elementary school) 7-10 (Junior Highschool) 11-12 (Senior Highschool)
- Gender: Coeducational
- Age: 6 to 18
- Education system: K-12 educational system
- Language: English and Filipino
- Campus type: Urban
- Song: K.Y.A Hymn (Kin Yang Academy Hymn)
- Accreditation: Philippine Department of Education Region IV-A
- Communities served: Cities of Dasmariñas, Imus and General Trias
- Affiliations: CDAPS, DPSAA

Kin Yang Academy (Filipino: Paaralan ng Kin Yang, abbreviated KYA) is a coeducational private school located in the city of Dasmariñas, province of Cavite, Philippines. The school offers elementary and secondary level of education.

== History ==
Kin Yang Academy was founded by Leodencio T. Obra and his wife Reny C. Obra in February 2000.

On the year 2013. Kin Yang Academy has a branch located in Sariaya, Quezon Province.

== Physical location ==
The school campus is located inside the Goldenville Subdivision II (Blk. 8 Lot 2 Pes-1st) in Brgy. Sabang in Dasmariñas, near the boundary with the city of Imus in the province of Cavite.

== Gallery ==
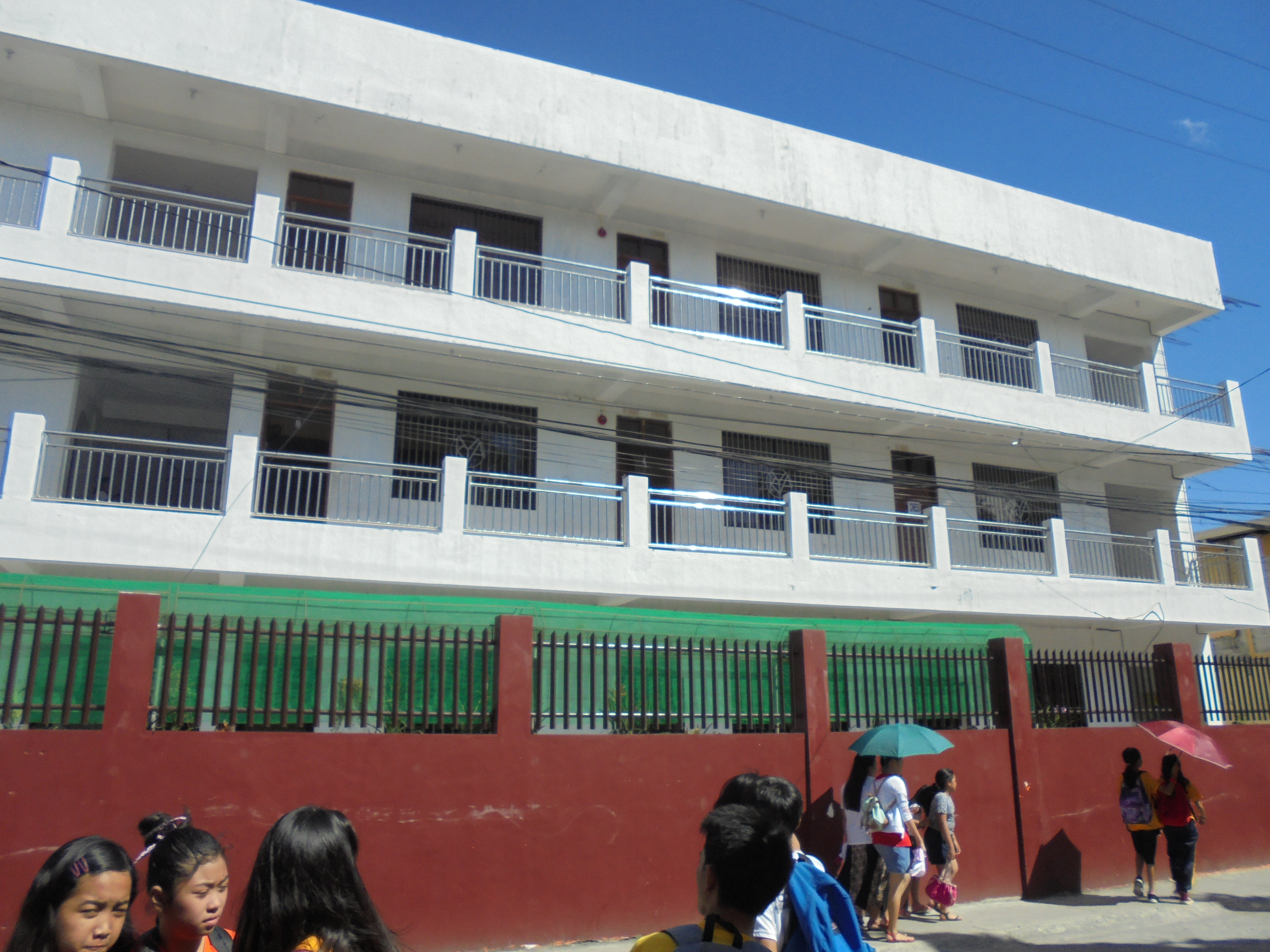
KYA - New Building - High School
