= Dasmariñas Bagong Bayan =

Informal district in the city of Dasmariñas, Philippines

Coordinates: 14°19′02″N 120°57′52″E

Dasmariñas Bagong Bayan (DBB), also known as Dasmariñas Resettlement Area, is an area located in the City of Dasmariñas established in 1975 through Letter of Instruction No. 19 signed by former President Ferdinand Marcos. It is the largest resettlement area in the country.

== History ==
The resettlement area was established by the Letter of Instruction No. 19 of the former President Ferdinand Marcos in 1975. Two hundred thirty-four hectares were bought by the Peoples Homesite Housing Corporation located 8 kilometers from the Municipal Center of Dasmariñas in 1961. It was bought at a total amount of two million and four hundred thousand pesos (P2,400,000). Later on, additional hectares were added for expansion. As of December 2000, according to the National Housing Authority (NHA), the total land area of Dasmariñas Bagong Bayan is 523.24 hectares with a total project cost of P281,330,210.91. There are a total of 22,428 households with a population of 148,137.

People living here came from former squatters along creeks, esteros, riverbanks and railway tracks of Paco, Pandacan, Santa Ana and the fringes of Fort Bonifacio. Some were squatters in private and government land in Tondo, Parañaque, and Quezon City. The families of Eduardo Coronel, Virgilio Argulla Sr., Rogelio Tomas, Ruben Alvarez, Manuel Rabang, Aurora Dela Cruz, and Diosdado Alto were the first ones to live here. Each families were given 90-200 square meters which they loan from the National Housing Authority (NHA).

In 1990, to help in the integration of the new settlers with the original inhabitants of the area as well as to stop discrimination, the local government passed a municipal ordinance penalizing anybody from mentioning the word "area". "Area" was commonly used to describe the resettlement area. The word "area" was dropped in public signboards of utility vehicles like jeepneys and public schools. On September 12, in the same year, the Sangguniang Bayan passed Order 108-90 to eliminate the dividing of the DBB into areas, reorganizing them in 46 barangays like other barangays. However despite the ordinances, it is still orally referred as "Area" when referring to the individual areas themselves.

== Barangays ==
=== DBB-A-1/DBB-1 ===
- San Dionisio
- San Esteban
- Sto. Cristo
- Sto. Niño I
- Sto. Niño II

=== DBB-A-2 ===
- San Juan
- Sta. Lucia

=== DBB-A-3 ===
- San Manuel I
- San Manuel II
- San Miguel I
- San Miguel II
- St. Peter I
- St. Peter II

=== DBB-B ===
- Burol I
- Burol II

=== DBB-C ===
- Parts of Burol III
- San Andres I
- San Andres II
- San Roque
- San Simon
- Sta. Cristina I
- Sta. Cristina II
- Victoria Reyes

=== DBB-D ===
- Luzviminda I
- Luzviminda II
- San Nicolas I
- San Nicolas II
- San Mateo

=== DBB-E ===
- Emmanuel Bergado I
- Emmanuel Bergado I
- San Lorenzo Ruiz I
- San Lorenzo Ruiz II
- San Luis I
- San Luis II
- Sta. Cruz I
- Sta. Cruz II

=== DBB-F ===
- Fatima I
- Fatima II
- Fatima III

=== DBB-G ===
- San Isidro Labrador I
- San Isidro Labrador II

=== DBB-H ===
- H-2 (Sta. Veronica)
- Sultan Esmael (H-1)

=== DBB-I ===
- San Francisco I
- San Francisco II
- Sta. Fe

=== DBB-J ===
- San Antonio de Padua I
- San Antonio de Padua II
- Sta. Maria

== See also ==
- Dasmariñas
