= Dasmariñas =

Component city in Cavite, Philippines

Dasmariñas Pérez-Dasmariñas Tampus
- Component city
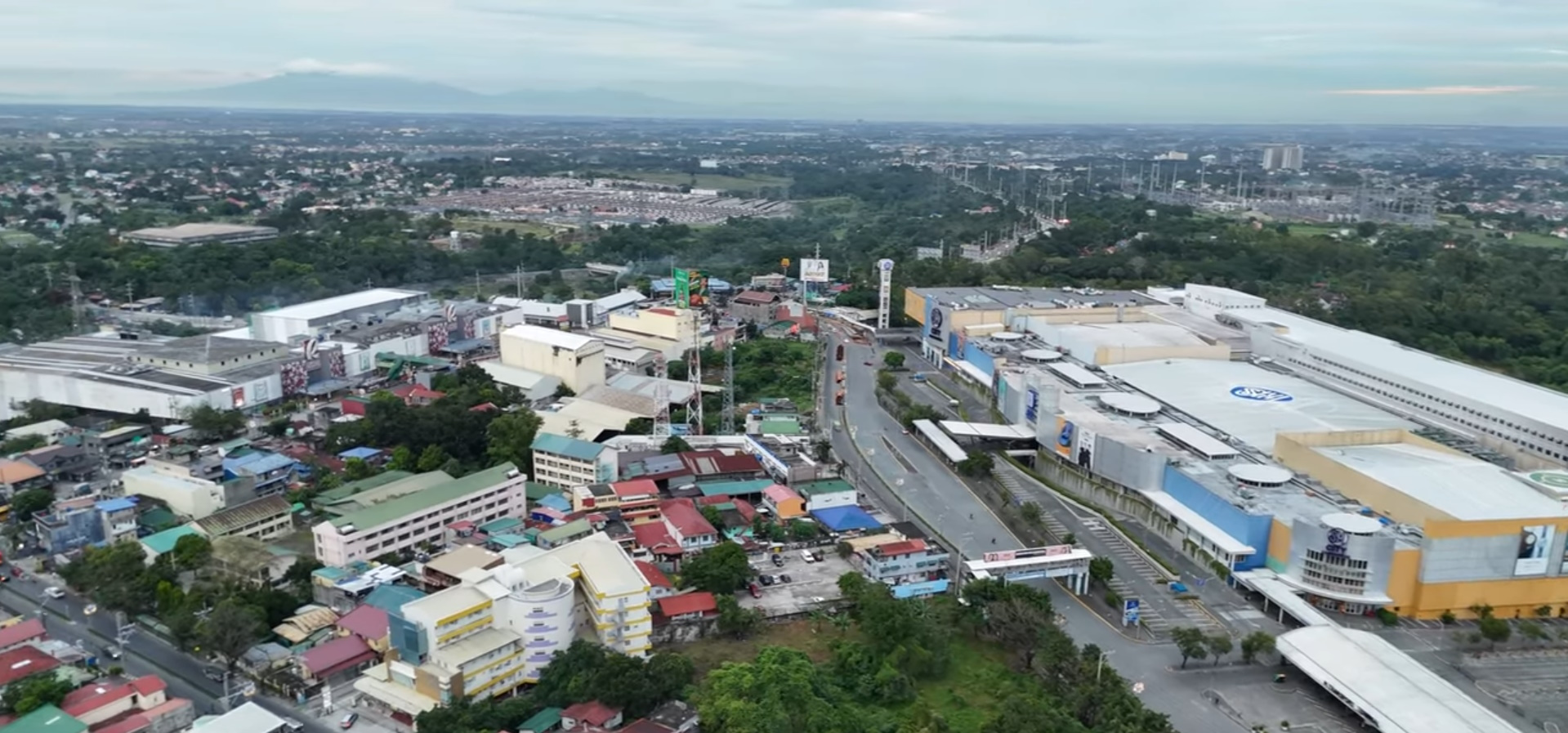
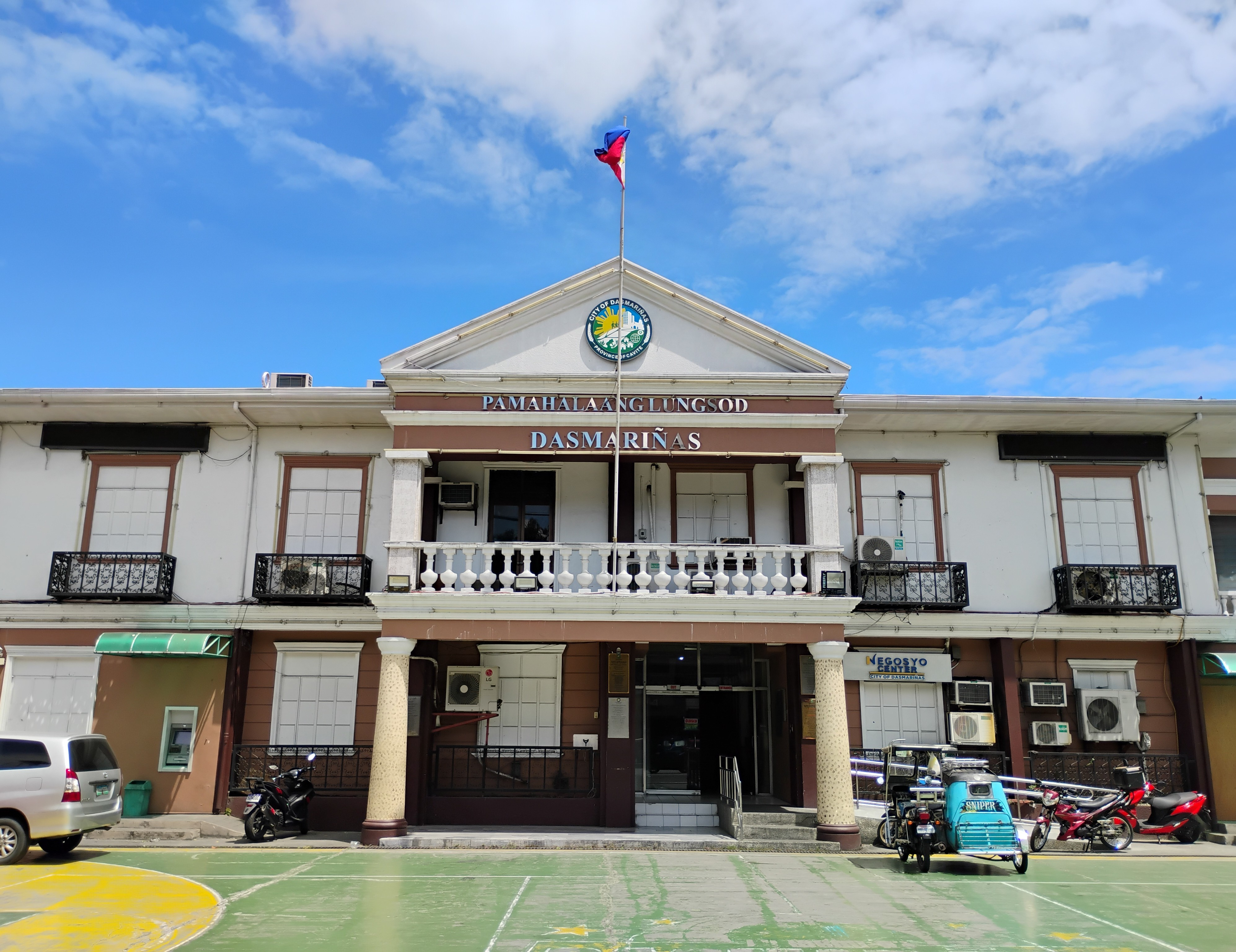
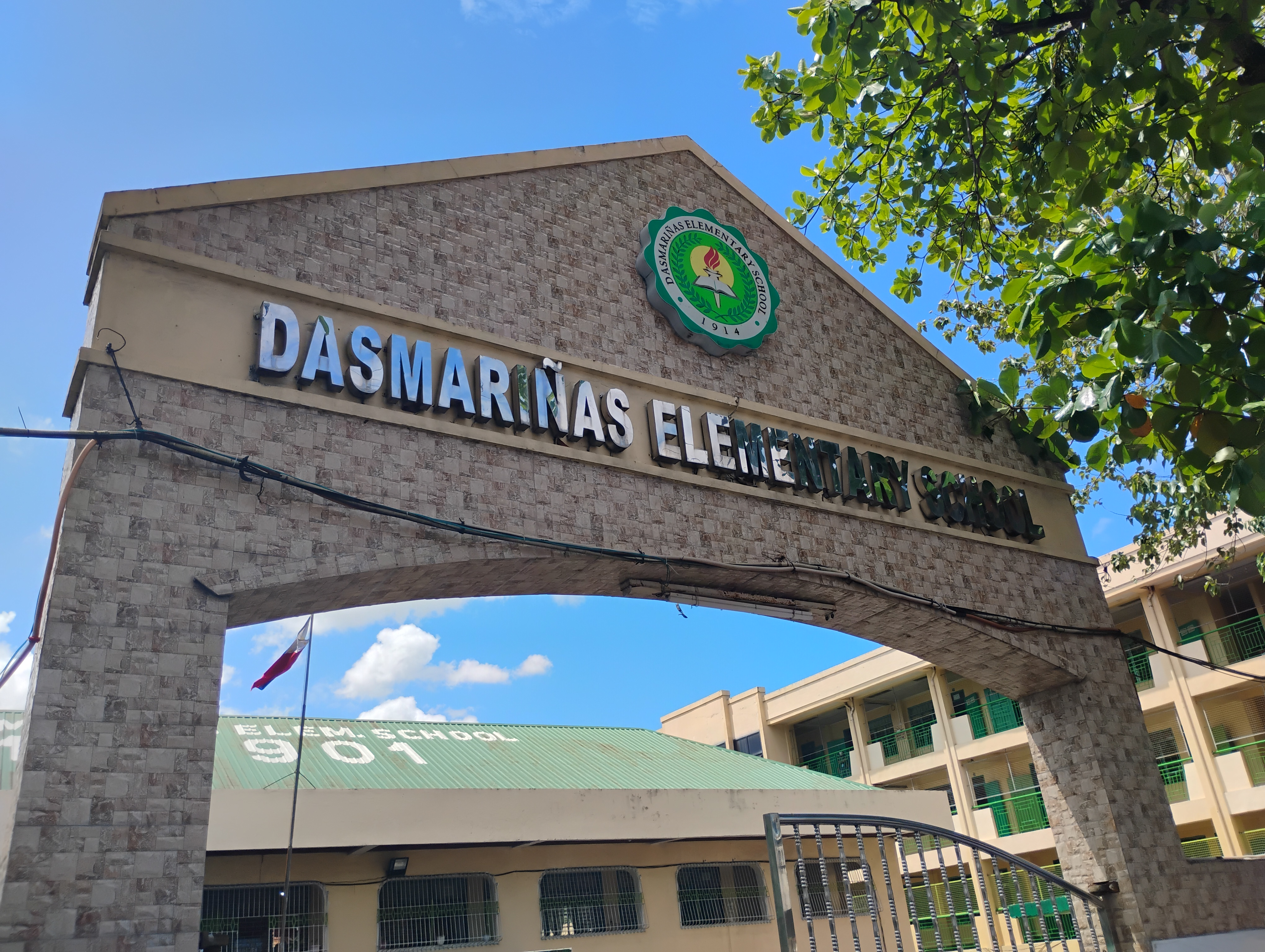
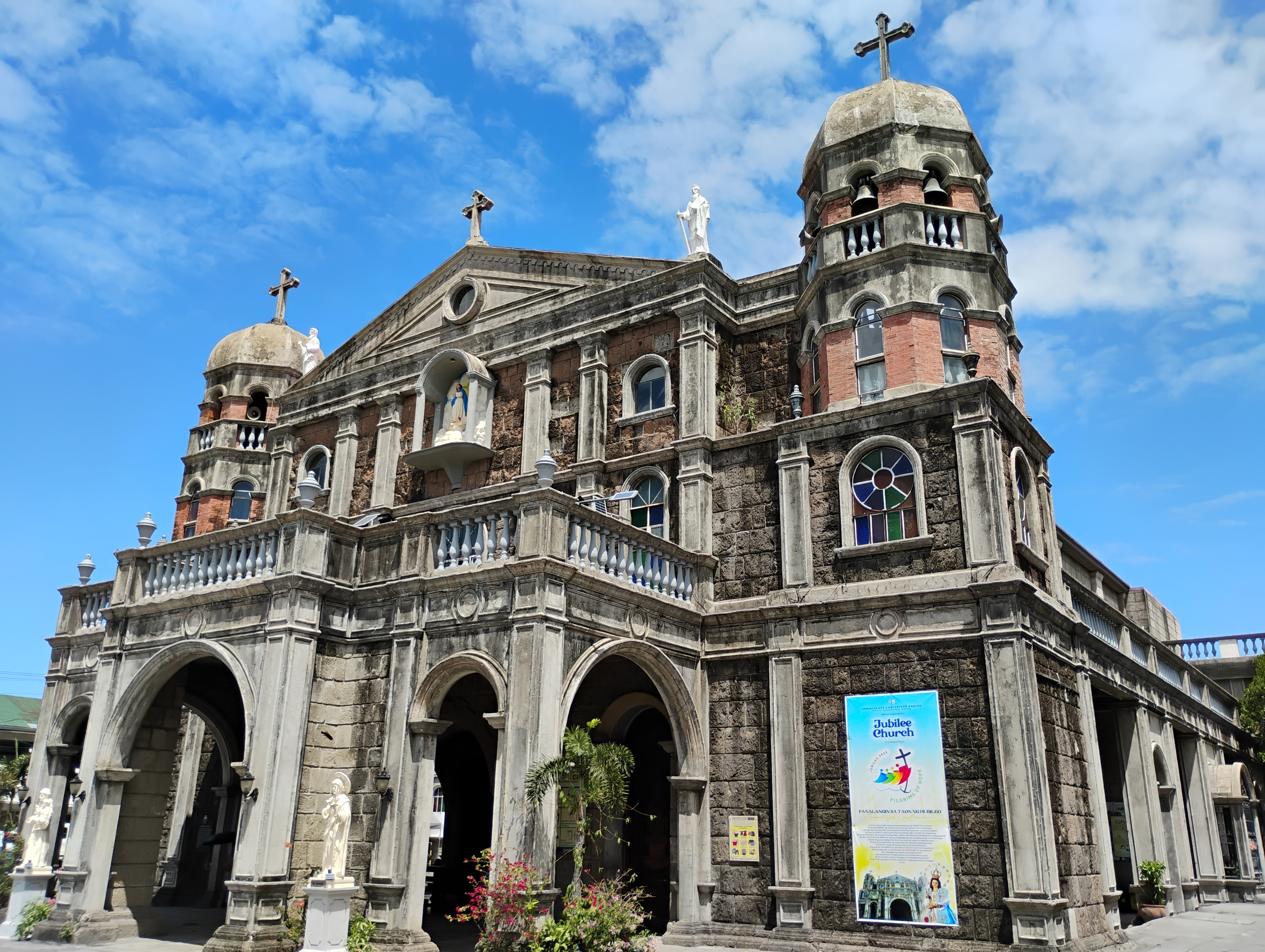
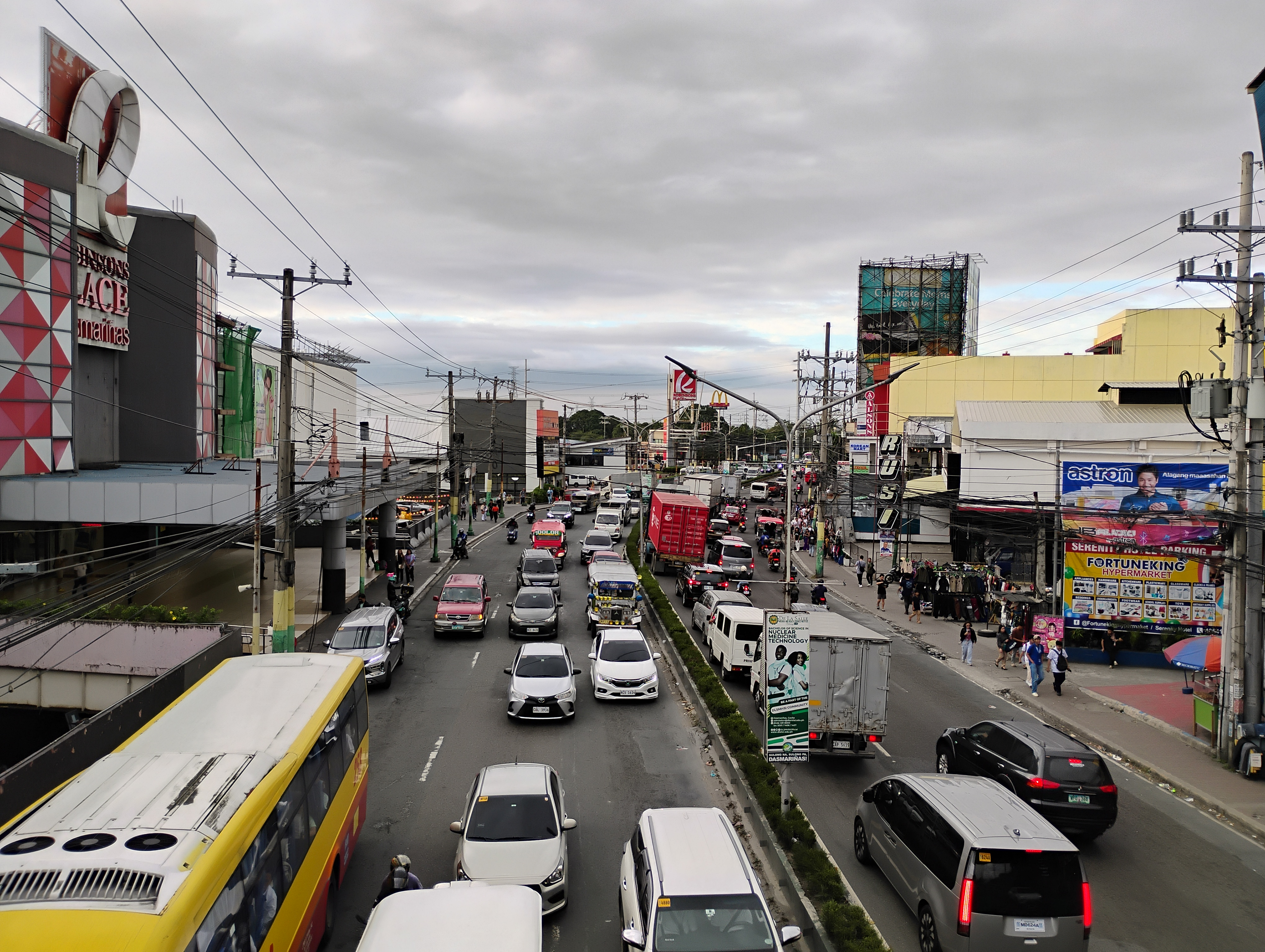
- (From top, clockwise) Aerial view of Dasmariñas, Dasmariñas Elementary School, Aguinaldo Highway, Immaculate Conception Parish, Old Dasmariñas City Hall

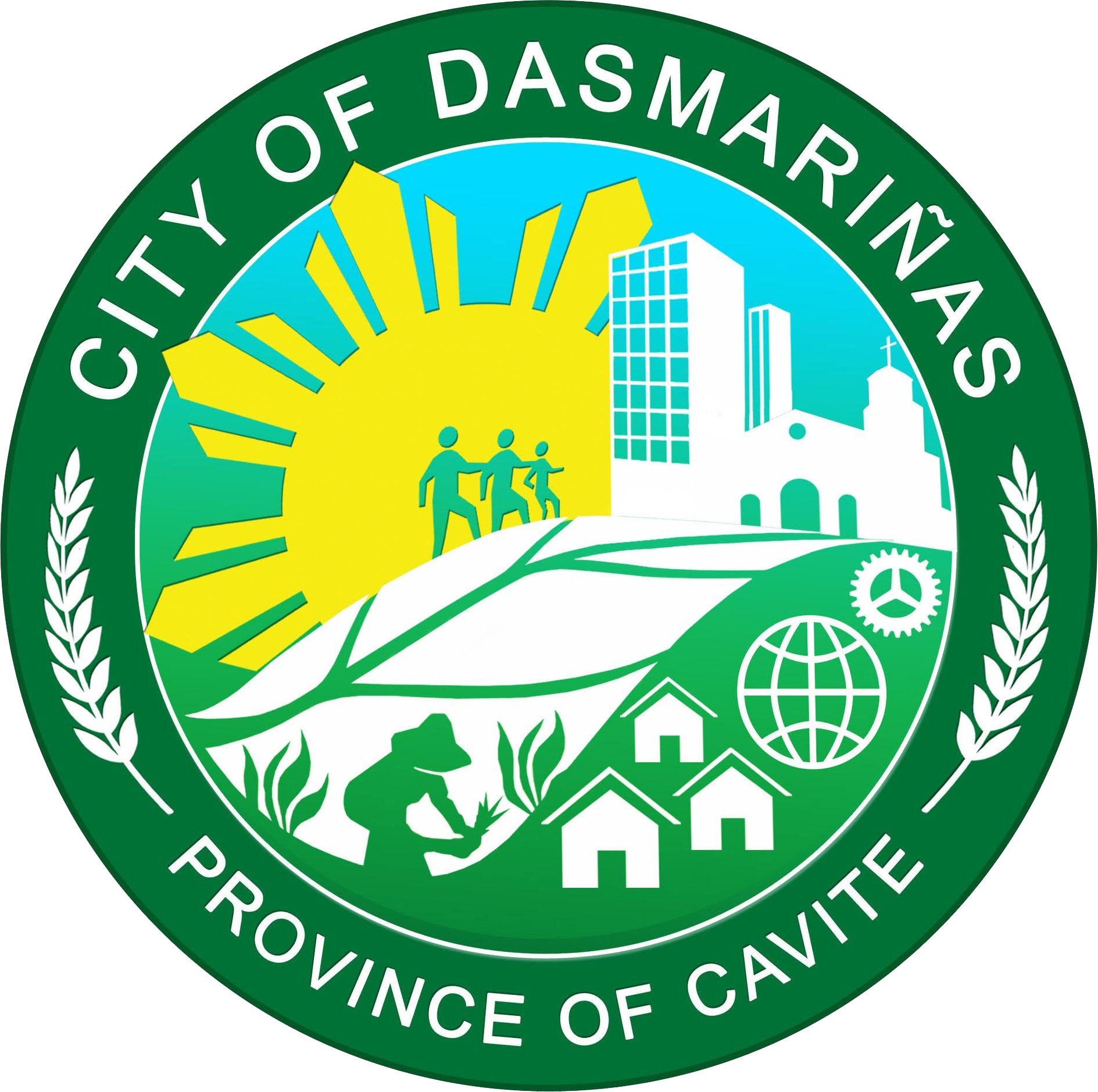
- Seal
- Nicknames: Industrial Giant of Cavite; University City of Cavite
- Motto: Sulong na, Sulong pa Lungsod ng Dasmariñas! (Onward, Forward City of Dasmariñas!)
- Anthem: “Dasmariñas Hymn”
- Map of Cavite with Dasmariñas highlighted
- Interactive map of Dasmariñas
- Location within the Philippines
- Coordinates: 14°20′N 120°56′E
- Country: Philippines
- Region: Calabarzon
- Province: Cavite
- District: 4th district
- Founded: 1867
- Annexation to Imus: October 15, 1903
- Chartered and renamed: 1917 (Note: In 1917, the "Perez" in its name was dropped after becoming a town again.)
- Cityhood: November 25, 2009
- Named for: Gómez Pérez Dasmariñas
- Barangays: 75 (see Barangays)

Government
  - Type: Sangguniang Panlungsod
  - Mayor: Elpidio "Third" A. Barzaga III
  - Vice Mayor: Teofilo “Rudy” Lara
  - Representative: Jennifer A. Barzaga
  - City Council: Members: Reynaldo C. Canaynay; Robin Chester J. Cantimbuhan; Daisy Lyn Alvarez; Kevin "Doc Kevin" Tapawan; Jerome Napoleon T. Gonzales; Roderick Atienza; Glenn Wynne S. Malihan; Jorge Magno; Azlie Guro; Fernando Laudato; Resty Encabo; Moises Menguito
  - Electorate: 432,844 voters (2025)

Area
  - Total: 90.13 km^{2} (34.80 sq mi)
- Elevation: 117 m (384 ft)
- Highest elevation: 334 m (1,096 ft)
- Lowest elevation: 2 m (6.6 ft)

Population (2024 census)
  - Total: 744,511
  - Density: 8,260/km^{2} (21,390/sq mi)
  - Households: 171,618
- Demonym: Dasmarineño

Economy
  - Income class: 1st city income class
  - Poverty incidence: 7.95% (2023)
  - Revenue: ₱ 41.39 million (2024)
  - Assets: ₱ 15,211 million (2024)
  - Expenditure: ₱ 3,548 million (2024)
  - Liabilities: ₱ 4,890 million (2024)

Service provider
  - Electricity: Manila Electric Company (Meralco)
  - Water: Dasmariñas Water District, PrimeWater (The city is currently trying to pre-terminate its contract with PrimeWater), Balibago Waterworks (covering Garden Villas Subdivision only)
- Time zone: UTC+8 (Philippine Standard Time)
- ZIP code: 4114, 4115, 4126
- PSGC: 042106000
- IDD : area code: +63 (0)46
- Native languages: Tagalog
- Website: cityofdasmarinas.gov.ph

Dasmariñas (Tagalog: [dɐsmaˈɾiɲɐs]), officially the City of Dasmariñas (Note: Filipino: Lungsod ng Dasmariñas; Cebuano: Dakbayan sa Dasmariñas; Cuyonon: Siyudad i'ang Dasmariñas; Central Bikol: Syudad nin Dasmariñas; Hiligaynon: Dakbanwa sang Dasmariñas; Maranao: Bandar a Dasmariñas; Maguindanaon: Kuta nu Dasmarinyas; Tausug: Dāira sin Dasmariñas; Ilocano: Siudad ti Dasmariñas; Kapampangan: Lakanbalen ning Dasmariñas; Pangasinan: Siyudad na Dasmariñas; Waray: Syudad han Dasmariñas), is a component city in the province of Cavite, Philippines. According to the 2024 census, it has a population of 744,511 people. With a land area of 90.1 square kilometers (34.8 sq mi), it is the largest city both in terms of area and population in Cavite and the wealthiest local government unit in the province.

Being located just 10 kilometers (6 mi) from Imus and 30 kilometers (19 mi) south of Manila, the growing congestion and conurbation of Metro Manila has led to its rapid development in the late 1900s. This growth is manifested by the influx of major shopping malls, hospitals, universities, banks, industrial parks, and the growing number of residential subdivisions accommodating its growing population.

== Etymology ==
Dasmariñas was named after Gómez Pérez Dasmariñas, the seventh Spanish governor-general of the Philippines who served from 1590 to 1593. After his death, his son Luis Pérez Dasmariñas became Governor-General from 1593 to 1596. Gómez Pérez Dasmariñas came from San Miguel das Negradas of Viveiro, in Galicia, Spain.

Dasmariñas literally means "from As Mariñas", a coastal region of Lugo combining the comarcas of A Mariña Occidental, A Mariña Central and A Mariña Oriental. The term itself comes from mariño ("of the coast, seaside or shore" in the Galician language spoken in Viveiro, and ultimately from mar ("sea").

== History ==
=== Foundation and Spanish Ruling ===
In the 19th century, during the Spanish colonial period, Dasmariñas was originally called Tampus, meaning "end of the forest" in the local Tagalog language. It was formerly a barrio of Imus and part of a vast Recollect hacienda that supported the various missionary activities of the Recollects in the Philippines and Spain.

On April 9, 1864, a council composed of the Archbishop of Manila, the politico-military governor of Cavite, the Prior Provincial of the Augustinian Recollect Order, and the parish priest of Imus met to discuss the creation of a new town and parish to separate from Imus. At that time, there were only 643 inhabitants in Tampus. After thorough discussions, Rafaél de Echagüe, the Governor-General of the Philippines, approved the creation of the new town on May 12, 1864, with Don Juan Ramirez elected as the first town head, or gobernadorcillo.

The creation of the town was unique among other towns in Cavite. For the first time, a town was established not through a petition from the local populace and its officials, as was customary and legally required, but instead through the initiative of high-ranking church officials and the Cavite politico-military governor.

An ensemble of nipa houses from other barrios of the hacienda, such as Malinta, Nancaan, Salacay, Paliparan, Malagasang, and Salitran, was grouped and migrated into a reducción (reduction) in Tampus in 1866. Reducción originally referred to the religious and civic aspects of missionary activities but later came to mean the process of resettling and unifying a community, thus creating a newly organized town. For the Spanish missionaries and friars, this process was advantageous for evangelization and consolidating Spanish rule. The new town could be accessed through a well-constructed network of roads and bridges built by the Recollect Order's architects and engineers.

In the same year, it was renamed Perez-Dasmariñas in honor of the seventh Governor-General of the Philippines, Don Gómez Pérez Dasmariñas (1590–1593). Governor Dasmariñas, a Knight of Santiago, was a native of Galicia, Spain and a former magistrate of Murcia and Cartagena, Spain, who introduced significant economic improvements during the early days of colonization.

By the end of 1866, Perez-Dasmariñas had met the requirements of a typical Philippine town. A spacious town plaza at the center was surrounded by a church and a convent made of stone and bricks, a courthouse constructed from wood and nipa, a primary school for children, and various houses made of nipa. A cemetery was situated approximately 200 yards away from the church and enclosed by a wooden fence.

Due to the growing population, the Recollects sent a petition to Madrid for the establishment of a new parish in Dasmariñas, independent from Imus. Queen Isabella II signed the Royal Order creating the new parish of Perez-Dasmariñas on October 21, 1866. The following year, the construction of the stone parish church of Dasmariñas, dedicated to the Virgin Mary as Our Lady of the Immaculate Conception, began.

=== The First Barangays ===
Dasmariñas was originally composed of several barangays or barrios (neighborhoods). Among these, Salitran was considered the most important and notable during the Spanish regime due to its role as the site of the Recollect estate house. The name Salitran is derived from the Tagalog word sal-it, meaning "people from another town." Being part of the Recollect Hacienda in the town of Imus, Salitran attracted many workers from various provinces who labored as farmhands. Within Salitran, a place called Layong Iloko was named for the Ilocanos who settled there, while Pasong Santol earned its name from the abundance of santol trees in the area.

Tampus, the center of the newly established town, was situated at the edge of a deep forest. This contrasts with a sitio in Paliparan called Pintóng Gubat ("gate of the forest.") Barangay names were often inspired by geographical features, as seen in Barrio Burol, whose name reflects its hill location. Similarly, Sabang means "crossroads." Barrio Salawag is believed to have been the old Barrio Salacay, with salawag referring to long bamboo poles used for securing nipa roofing.

Nancaan, now known as Langkaan, derived its name from the Tagalog word langkâ, meaning "jackfruit." The jackfruit, the largest fruit tree in the Philippines, was reportedly introduced from India to Malaysia and later planted in the country by Arabs and Indians. The prevalence of jackfruit trees in the area likely inspired the name Nancaan.

Malinta, or Malintaan, comes from the Tagalog word lintá, meaning "leech," due to the abundance of leeches in the area.

On July 18, 1899, three sitios in Perez-Dasmariñas were elevated to the status of barrios: Sampaloc, named for the abundance of tamarind trees; Tamban, later renamed San Jose; and Lucsuhin, later renamed San Agustin.

=== The Philippine Revolution ===
By June 1896, the Spanish authorities in Cavite province had become suspicious of the local elite's activities. There were alleged top hierarchy meetings of the Recollects in the hacienda houses of Salitran and San Nicolas. Included in the meeting were General Bernardo Echaluce and other top military officials. The purpose of the meeting was to determine whether it was just to apprehend the notable elites who were Freemasons. Fortunately for the elites, no decision was made during the meeting. Thus, the local leaders freely but quietly continued their subversive activities.

As soon as the revolution of 1896 broke out, leaders of Perez-Dasmariñas took up arms against the Spanish rule. Don Placido Campos, the town head at the time and Don Francisco Barzaga, the municipal secretary, gathered the people to liberate their town from Spanish control at the beginning of September 1896. They captured the courthouse and the hacienda house in Salitran, killing the religious clergy who lived there.

As towns in Cavite fell to Filipino revolutionaries, the Spanish government in Madrid felt that Governor-General Ramon Blanco's offensive against the natives was ineffective. Thus, Camilo de Polavieja took over the command of the islands, with General José de Lachambre as the head of the campaign. Gradually, the Spaniards regained the control of the province. After the fall of Silang, the Spaniards focused on Perez-Dasmariñas. Knowing the strength of resistance he might encounter, General Lechambre decided to surround the whole town. He sent to advance units headed by Brigadier General José Molina who went to take the left. The troop under Colonel Arutos who had taken Paliparan, moved westward to cut the escape of the Filipinos to Imus and Carmona. General Lechambre sent the main force towards the south.

The locals suffered a terrible defeat due to a lack of arms and ammunition. As the Spaniards approached the Poblacion, the revolutionaries retreated to the stone building of the town. On February 25, 1897, the Spaniards decided to encircle the Poblacion rather than advance directly into the interior. They began burning all the buildings except the church. Seeing that they were surrounded by fire, some of the rebels came out of hiding but were immediately met with open fire. Those who had taken refuge in the courthouse refused to come out and were all burned alive. Even those who had sought refuge in the church eventually surrendered to the advancing Spanish forces. By March, Perez-Dasmariñas had fallen back into Spanish hands.

Then, General Lachambre returned to Salitran. He expected heavy resistance from the revolutionaries who occupied the hacienda house but to his great surprise, they were able to take the place without any resistance. They hoisted the flag of Spain and converted it to their headquarters.

There were large Filipino casualties according to Lachambre. There were 150 men inside the courthouse when Spaniards set fire to the building and all 150 inside were killed. Others took refuge in the convent, but was also set on fire and the men were shot as they emerged. Others had shut themselves up in the church. With the church surrounded, the mountain artillery was brought up into position and from a distance of 35 meters, the strong doors of the church were bombarded and the troops went in through the breach. At the height of the Battle of Perez Dasmariñas, General Flaviano Yengko, General Crispulo Aguinaldo, Lucas Camerino, Arturo Reyes and many more revolutionaries lost their lives in the battle.

=== An American Plan ===
With the signing of the Treaty of Paris on December 10, 1898, the Philippines was ceded to America by Spain. The American regime brought to Dasmariñas, as it did to other parts of the country, several fundamental changes in the system of government, in language, and in educational system.

In the month of February 1899, the Philippine–American War began. General Henry Ware Lawton's brigade operated south of Manila including the province of Cavite in the middle of June 1899. The Americans could not land directly at Bacoor because Zapote river was defended by the Filipino revolutionists who built trenches as tactical defenses forming three sides of an angle which made the Filipinos hardly visible. The American's 14th Infantry Battalion swam across the during the Battle of Zapote River and under the cover of military artillery, charged against the Filipinos who then retreated to the woods.

Moving southward, the Americans encountered more Filipino revolutionaries in the towns of Bacoor, Imus, and Perez-Dasmariñas, and an infantry battalion narrowly escaped annihilation. News had been brought to the American camp that the Filipino soldiers had evacuated the town and that the native mayor was disposed to surrender it formally to the Americans. The battalion thus went there to take possession, but before reaching the place, the Filipino revolutionists closed in on all sides, and a heavy firefight went on for hours. The Americans were saved from destruction by a desperate bayonet charge when they were rescued by General Weaton's brigade.

Placido Campos, who sided with General Emilio Aguinaldo since the beginning of the Philippine-American War in 1899, was captured together with his nephew Guillermo Campos. They were imprisoned at the Provost Political Prison in Intramuros where they were kept for six months.

The Americans established military rule in 1900. By order of the colonel of the American troops stationed in Perez-Dasmariñas, the residents of the town nominated a president and a vice-president. Elected through the raising of hands were Francisco Barzaga as president and Conrado Malihan as vice-president. They served their office until the civil government was established by the Americans in 1901.

On January 31, 1901, in accordance with President William McKinley's instructions that the Filipinos be allowed to manage their own municipal governments, the Second Philippine Commission enacted Act No. 82, the new Municipal Code, placing each municipal government under the following officials: the municipal president, the vice-president, and the municipal council, who were elected by qualified voters every two years. In line with this, Placido Campos was again elected as the head of the municipality of Perez-Dasmariñas in October 1901. Francisco Barzaga then became the municipal treasurer. The two were re-elected in 1903.

In 1903, the Americans conducted the first census in the Philippines. Francisco Barzaga and the secretary, Esteban Quique, were made census enumerators for Perez-Dasmariñas under the leadership of Placido Campos. When the census was finished, the total population of the town was only 3,500. Before the revolution of 1898, the population was estimated to be 12,000. Comparing the population prior to the revolution with that of 1948, there has been a decrease in the population of Perez-Dasmariñas.

On October 15, 1903, the municipalities of Bacoor and Perez-Dasmariñas were merged with Imus.

In 1917, under Governor-General Francis Burton Harrison, Perez-Dasmariñas was again declared a separate municipality. The provincial governor of Cavite, Antero S. Soriano, convened the local leaders, including Placido Campos, Francisco Barzaga, and Felipe Tirona. Together, they agreed to remove the word "Perez" and retain only "Dasmariñas" as the new name of the town. For the second time, Placido Campos was appointed mayor.

Development slowly came in the 1930s when the Aguinaldo Highway was constructed.

=== World War II ===
During the Japanese occupation in World War II, the Japanese conducted zonifications in the town. The barrios of Paliparan and Salawag suffered the most number of deaths. Being remote places and thinking that guerrillas were hiding there, these two barrios were zonified two times giving up several lives. The Japanese Imperial Army made the schools as their garrison.

Meanwhile, after surviving in the Bataan Death March and released from Camp O'Donnell concentration camp in Capas, Tarlac, General Mariano Castañeda returned to Cavite and helped organized the resistance movement in Dasmariñas headed by Colonel Estanislao Mangubat-Carungcong of the 4th Infantry Regiment of Camp Neneng Dasmariñas and Colonel Emiliano de la Cruz of the 14th Infantry Regiment of Camp Paliparan. This unit provided guerilla warfare and was prepared to attack, sabotage missions, cut off enemy communications and logistics, perform recoinnaissance missions, provide protection to civilians against aggression by the Imperial Japanese Army, provide evacuation plans for them, and intensify intelligence reports to the U.S. 11th Airborne Division headed by General Joseph Swing and 187th Glider Infantry Regiment under Colonel Harry B. Hildebrand .

In May 1943, The Imperial Japanese Army have received intelligence reports of the guerilla camp of the 4th Infantry Regiment in the west side of the town. They then positioned two long range cannons and fired 30 rounds, damaging rice plantations and crops, killing a large amount of cattle, and terrorized the Poblacion. Nevertheless, vigilant about the situation, the guerillas have narrowly escaped complete annihilation. After the assault, the town became too hot to the Japanese because of the active guerilla operations and the existence of the headquarters of the guerillas in Neneng Dasmariñas.

As the Sakdalistas and Makapili (Japanese collaborators) denouncing and reporting all guerilla activities of Colonel Estanislao M. Carungcong to the notorious Kempeitai, the Japanese military police, in exchange for payments and privileges, because of it the Kempeitai made another zonification on July 25, 1943, in the town proper until guerilla regimental staff Lt. Colonel Jose M. Carungcong, Major Dominador I. Mangubat, Captain Elpidio Mangubat-Barzaga Sr., and Captain Jovito Evangelista were captured and imprisoned for two months in a prison camp in Muntinlupa until they were released, except for Lt. Colonel Jose M. Carungcong, who was sentenced to six years in prison.

On June 24, 1944, the Hunters ROTC guerillas headed by Colonel Emmanuel de Ocampo, Lieutenant Colonel Vic Estacio, and Colonel Eleuterio Terry Adevoso raided the New Bilibid Prison in Muntinlupa and rescued many prisoners of war and a good haul of firearms and ammunition. Among the prisoners rescued was Lt. Colonel Jose Carungcong, who managed a jailbreak during the raids of the prison camp. Thereafter, the Japanese Military authorities immediately issued a 50,000 peso reward in exchange for his capture.

On August 25, 1944, with the help of the guerilla soldiers of the 4th Infantry Regiment, 114 Filipino military prisoners, 4 American senior officers, Volckmann's guerilla, and 70 more prisoners of war made a jailbreak at the prison camp in Muntinlupa. They were in poor health condition, deprived of proper meals, and were too skinny. They were kept in Camp Neneng Dasmariñas and given aid and sustenance and were treated by Major Dominador I. Mangubat, who was also a medical doctor, for two months until they recovered from malnutrition.

On December 17, 1944, from 0100 hours until 1800 hours, around 1,000 Kempeitai from Fort Santiago conducted another zonification in the poblacion and adjacent barrios. The Immaculate Conception Parish Church was used as their garrison and all suspected male residents involved or coordinating with the guerrilla operations of Colonel Estanislao M. Carungcong, with the advice of the Makapili collaborators, 15 active guerilleros of the Cobra unit 4th Infantry Regiment were tortured inside the church and some others that were brought to the back of the Dasmariñas Elementary School were tortured and bayonetted to death. Some were hanged at the old mango tree near the school canteen, whipped, beaten, tortured to forcefully expose and divulge the guerillas. Women were abducted and raped by the Japanese soldier. There were those who experienced the so-called "tinutubig" wherein the head is immersed in a drum of water.

On January 15, 1945, the day before the FACGF General Castañeda - US 11th Airborne Major Jay Vanderpool conference in Camp Neneng Dasmariñas, local guerrillas ambushed nine Japanese soldiers inside a jitney in Anabu Road in Salitran. The next day, on January 16, Japanese soldiers retaliated by firing indiscriminately on the civilian population.

On January 30, 1945, as Allied forces began to land in Nasugbu, Batangas, the guerilla force of the 4th Infantry Regiment under Colonel Estanislao Mangubat Carungcong, a battalion under Major Zacarias Santiaguel of the 1st Infantry Regiment protected the National Highway 17 (Aguinaldo Highway) and attacked enemy positions at the national Highway 17 from Palapala Road extending 3000 yards east and west of the National Highway 17 up to Salitran Road. The 14th Infantry Regiment headed by Colonel Emiliano de la Cruz protected the highway between Dasmariñas and Carmona to prevent the enemy to rally a counterattack and to clear the path of the U.S. 11th Airborne Division under General Joseph Swing which were being dropped via parachute in Tagaytay. Japanese military vehicles approaching from the north, east, and south sides of the town were ambushed.

FACGF Division Commander General Mariano Castañeda issued the command to liberate Dasmariñas to Colonel Estanislao Mangubat-Carungcong. The combined contingent of the FACGF's 4th Regiment, together with Colonel Lorenzo Saulog's 1st Infantry Regiment and Colonel Maximo Reyes' 11th Infantry Regiment killed 56 Japanese soldiers of the Imperial Japanese Army garrisoned in Dasmarinas and the nearby town of Imus leading to the total liberation of Dasmariñas.

=== Post-War ===
After the war, the Philippines became independent and Dasmariñas started to develop. The population increased because of the mass exodus of families from Metro Manila and nearby provinces.

The Dasmariñas Bagong Bayan (DBB), also known as Dasmariñas Resettlement Area, was established in 1975 by Letter of Instruction No. 19 issued by the then President Ferdinand Marcos.

From 1983 onwards Dasmariñas had an economic boom. Different factories and establishments sprouted in the town which gave way for the growth in population. From a sixth-class municipality, the town became a first-class municipality.

=== Cityhood ===
There have been several attempts to convert Dasmariñas into a city. The first attempt was in 1997, when HB08931 was filed by Congressman Renato P. Dragon with other cityhood bills of Imus (HB 08960) and Bacoor (HB 08959). It was filed last February 11, 1997, and read last February 13, 1997. Committee Report N0. 01361 was submitted on December 17, 1997. It was approved on the third reading by the House last January 10, 1998. It did not push through as a Republic Act and no plebiscite happened.

The second attempt was in 2000, when HB099883 was filed by Congressman Erineo Maliksi last March 13, 2000. It was first read last March 13, 2000. It was approved on the Second and Third reading of House last March 15, 2000, and March 27, 2000. It was transmitted to the senate on March 28, 2000, and received on March 31, 2000. It did not push through as a Republic Act and no plebiscite happened.

The idea of converting Dasmariñas into a component city was again proposed for the third time after failure in 1997 and 2000. House Bill no. 5258 converting the municipality of Dasmariñas into a component city was filed by Cavite 2nd District Congressman Elpidio F. Barzaga Jr. on October 3, 2008. It was later signed by President Gloria Macapagal Arroyo as Republic Act No. 9723 on October 15, 2009.

COMELEC Resolution No. 8682 in connection with the November 25, 2009, plebiscite to ratify the conversion of the municipality of Dasmariñas province of Cavite into a component city pursuant to Republic Act 9723 dated October 15, 2009.

Republic Act No. 9723 was ratified by the registered voters of Dasmariñas through a plebiscite conducted last November 25, 2009, converted the municipality of Dasmariñas in the province of Cavite into a component city to be known as the City of Dasmariñas. There were about 44,000 voters who cast the plebiscite ballot in the town's 1,508 polling precincts. The yes votes won overwhelmingly. The yes votes got 36,559 while the no votes got 8,141.

Mayor Jennifer Austria-Barzaga, elected in 2007, is both the first female mayor and first city mayor of Dasmariñas since its achieving city status.

In 2011, the Paro-Paro Festival was first celebrated. It is celebrated every November 26 to commemorate the incorporation of the city of Dasmariñas with people dancing and parading in the streets in butterfly costumes. In November 2013, the Paru-Paro Festival was cancelled as allocated funds would be donated to the Typhoon Yolanda victims.

As of the 2020 census, the city recorded a population of more than 700,000. The city serves as a catalyst for major economic development and sustained growth for the Greater Manila Area since the 1990s. The influx of industries, educational and health institutions, shopping malls, and real estate developments is significant.

== Geography ==
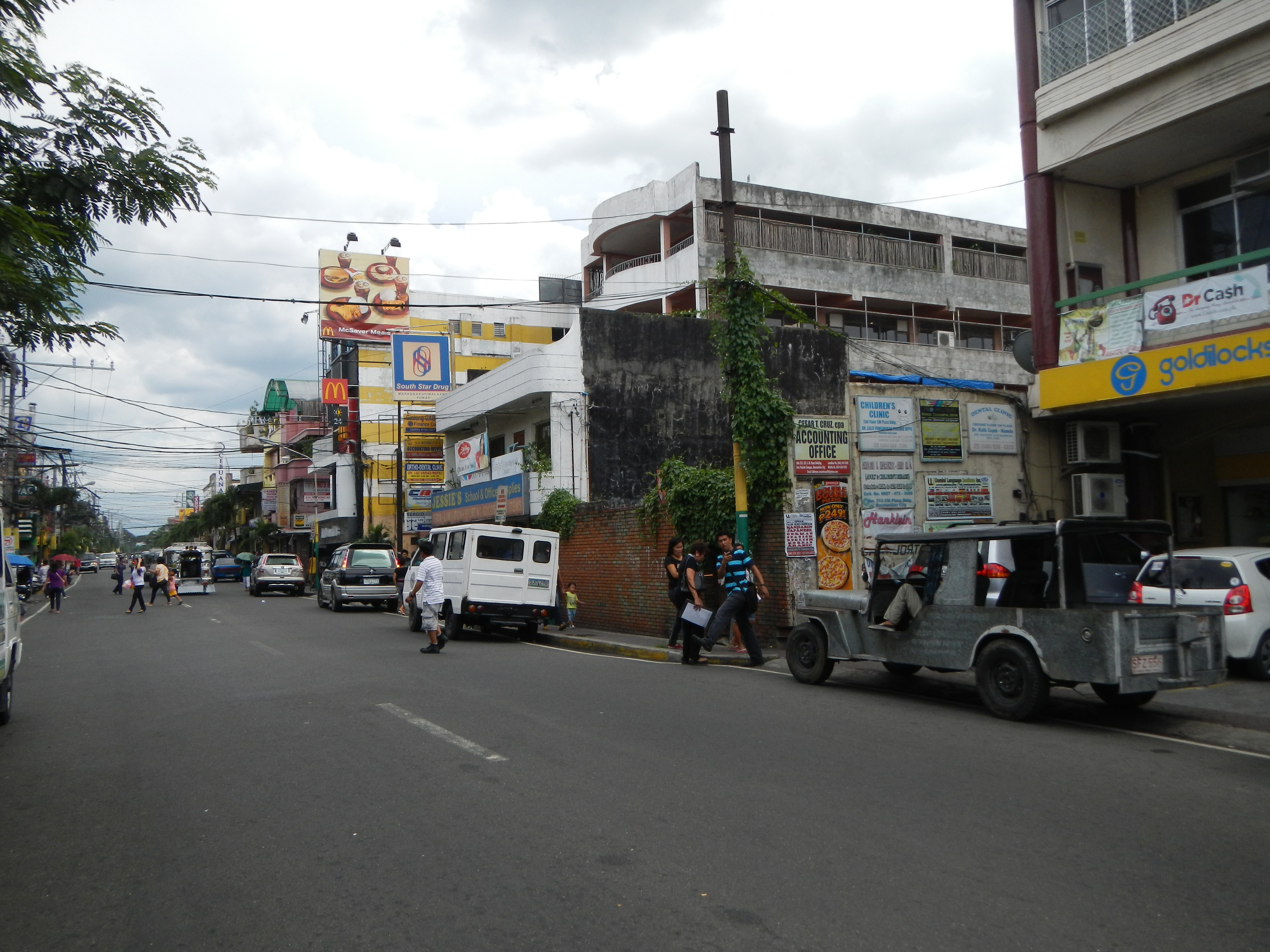
Poblacion

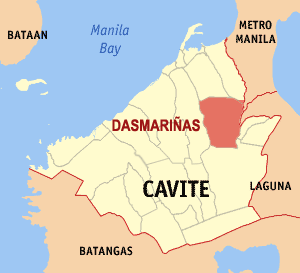
Previous Dasmariñas map in 2005

Dasmariñas is about 8,234 hectares (20,350 acres). It is bounded by Imus and Bacoor to the north, Silang to the south, Muntinlupa and Las Piñas in Metro Manila to the northeast, General Mariano Alvarez, San Pedro in Laguna to the east, and General Trias to the west.

The city center, or the poblacion, is on the westernmost part of the city, Sabang, San Jose, Salawag and Salitran are in the north, San Agustin, Langkaan, and Sampaloc are in the south, Paliparan is on the easternmost part, while Burol and Bagong Bayan are in the middle, sandwiched between the Poblacion and Paliparan.

The city of Dasmariñas is landlocked. However, it is not too far from the coastal towns of Rosario, Kawit, Bacoor, Noveleta and Cavite City whose average distance from Poblacion is less than 30 kilometers (19 mi). It is about the same distance from Laguna de Bay and 29 kilometres (18 mi) from the resort city of Tagaytay and the famous Taal Lake.

At present, Dasmariñas is served by corridors traversing the central areas which provide linkages to the Metropolitan Manila area core in the north and the developing nodes of Laguna and Batangas.

=== Topography ===
Dasmariñas is partly lowland and partly hilly. The Poblacion itself is elevated. From an elevation of 80 meters (260 ft) at the Poblacion, the land rises to 250 meters (820 ft) towards Silang. Generally, land near rivers and creeks are rugged. Dasmariñas is outside the typhoon belt and has no fault line constraints. Further, it is served by natural drainage system since it is traversed by several rivers and water tributaries draining to the Manila Bay. The city has not yet to experience floods.

Strongly sloping to elevated areas cover approximately 1,532.16 hectares (3,786.0 acres) or 18.61% of the total area. These are dispersed among Burol, Langkaan, Paliparan, Salawag, Sampaloc and San Agustin. Areas with slopes 10.1 to 18% cover about 575.72 hectares (1,422.6 acres) of land in portions of Salawag, Salitran, Burol, and other parts.

On the other hand, gently sloping or undulating areas comprise merely 710.4 hectares (1,755 acres) or 8.62% of the total land area while undulating areas with a slope of 2.6 to 5% account for the biggest percentage of 50.59% of the total land area equivalent to 4,165.64 hectares (10,293.5 acres) of land which are dispersed over the municipality except Sabang and San Jose.

=== Climate ===
Dasmariñas has a tropical wet and dry climate (Köppen climate classification: Aw) with two pronounced seasons: wet season and dry season. Wet season covers the period from May to December of each year and dry season covers the period from January to April.

Climate data for Dasmariñas, Cavite
Month	Jan	Feb	Mar	Apr	May	Jun	Jul	Aug	Sep	Oct	Nov	Dec	Year
Mean daily maximum °C (°F)	29.4 (84.9)	30.4 (86.7)	31.9 (89.4)	33.4 (92.1)	33.2 (91.8)	31.6 (88.9)	30.5 (86.9)	30.0 (86.0)	30.2 (86.4)	30.5 (86.9)	30.2 (86.4)	29.3 (84.7)	30.9 (87.6)
Daily mean °C (°F)	25.4 (77.7)	25.9 (78.6)	27.0 (80.6)	28.5 (83.3)	28.7 (83.7)	27.7 (81.9)	27.0 (80.6)	26.7 (80.1)	26.8 (80.2)	26.8 (80.2)	26.5 (79.7)	25.6 (78.1)	26.9 (80.4)
Mean daily minimum °C (°F)	21.4 (70.5)	21.4 (70.5)	22.2 (72.0)	23.6 (74.5)	24.2 (75.6)	23.9 (75.0)	23.5 (74.3)	23.5 (74.3)	23.4 (74.1)	23.2 (73.8)	22.8 (73.0)	22.0 (71.6)	22.9 (73.3)
Average precipitation mm (inches)	21 (0.8)	9 (0.4)	13 (0.5)	23 (0.9)	143 (5.6)	254 (10.0)	370 (14.6)	408 (16.1)	317 (12.5)	191 (7.5)	140 (5.5)	81 (3.2)	1,970 (77.6)
Source: Climate-data.org

== Demographics ==
Population census of Dasmariñas
Year	Pop.	±% p.a.
1903	3,028	—
1918	3,875	+1.66%
1939	8,323	+3.71%
1948	9,012	+0.89%
1960	11,744	+2.23%
1970	17,948	+4.33%
1975	22,805	+4.92%
1980	51,894	+17.87%
1990	136,556	+10.16%
1995	262,406	+13.02%
2000	379,520	+8.23%
2007	556,330	+5.42%
2010	575,817	+1.26%
2015	659,019	+2.60%
2020	703,141	+1.37%
2024	744,511	+1.38%
Source: Philippine Statistics Authority

In the 2024 census, the population of Dasmariñas was 744,511 people, with a density of 8,300 inhabitants per square kilometer or 21,000 inhabitants per square mile.

From the original 643 inhabitants of the old Perez-Dasmariñas, the population grew and so did the town. By 1888, there were already more than 4,576 people living in Perez Dasmariñas. Gradually, the economic life of the people improved. The inquilinos (lessees) of the hacienda rose to become the middle class. Dasmariñas, 8,664 hectares were all farmed in 1890 except for 3,770 hectares (including parcels at Gatdula and Balimbing). Lessees paid the usual land rent base on the measurement of lowland and upland riceland set up by the "uldog" (friar administrator) of casa hacienda de Salitran. In the 1880s, there were 200 quinones of dry and 50 quinones of wet ricelands yielding some 2,300 cavanas of palay, 5,000 piculs of muscavado sugar, 50 cavans of corn and camote, 60 piculs of tao and 25 piculs of peanuts.

Dasmariñas was a highly advanced town where not only textiles from Batangas and Bulacan looms, but also imported European cloth from Manila reached the town elites. Fish and other staple food however still came from nearby towns. Surprisingly until 1880, there was no public market in the town. There was a principal public dirt road in Perez-Dasmariñas that went to Silang which was passable to all kinds of vehicle only during dry season, but reachable only by foot and horseback during wet season. By 1870, mails from Manila were received at a central station in Cavite Puerto where it was sorted. Mails were brought via Kawit, then Imus then Dasmariñas.

Culturally, Perez-Dasmariñas was not too behind for by 1874 there were already two competing brass bands in the town. Don Valeriano Campos, an inquilino and a former gobernadorcillo of the town (1879 to 1881) organized one of the brass bands. He was popularly known as Capitang Vale. He was the highest taxpayer and owned a house made of cogon and wood on Calle Real with an appraised value of P300. His son Placido Campos learned his trade and also considered a man of means. Manuela Monzon, another well to do woman owned a house at the town's main street. The house made of nipa and wood was valued at P200 and was rented as a boys' school for P72.

Nonetheless, in 1892, there was a noticeable decrease of the male population. As conflict between the friar-hacenderos, the inquilinos and casamas multiplied more people went into hiding in the deep forest of Perez-Dasmariñas. The rise of tulisanismo in Cavite was often connected with agrarian problems in the hacienda town owned by the friars.

The city has 75 barangays, has more than 180 subdivisions and the biggest resettlement area in the Philippines, the Dasmariñas Bagong Bayan (DBB).

Most affluent families from Metro Manila and nearby towns and provinces have chosen Dasmariñas to be their home due to its proximity to the National Capital Region. The mass exodus of people here in Dasmariñas is also brought about by the industrial boom which brought about more jobs. There are also a big number of foreign residents such as Koreans, Chinese, Japanese, Americans, Hindus, Britons and Eurasians. Because of this, Dasmariñas can be also considered as the "Melting Pot" of Cavite.

=== Religion ===
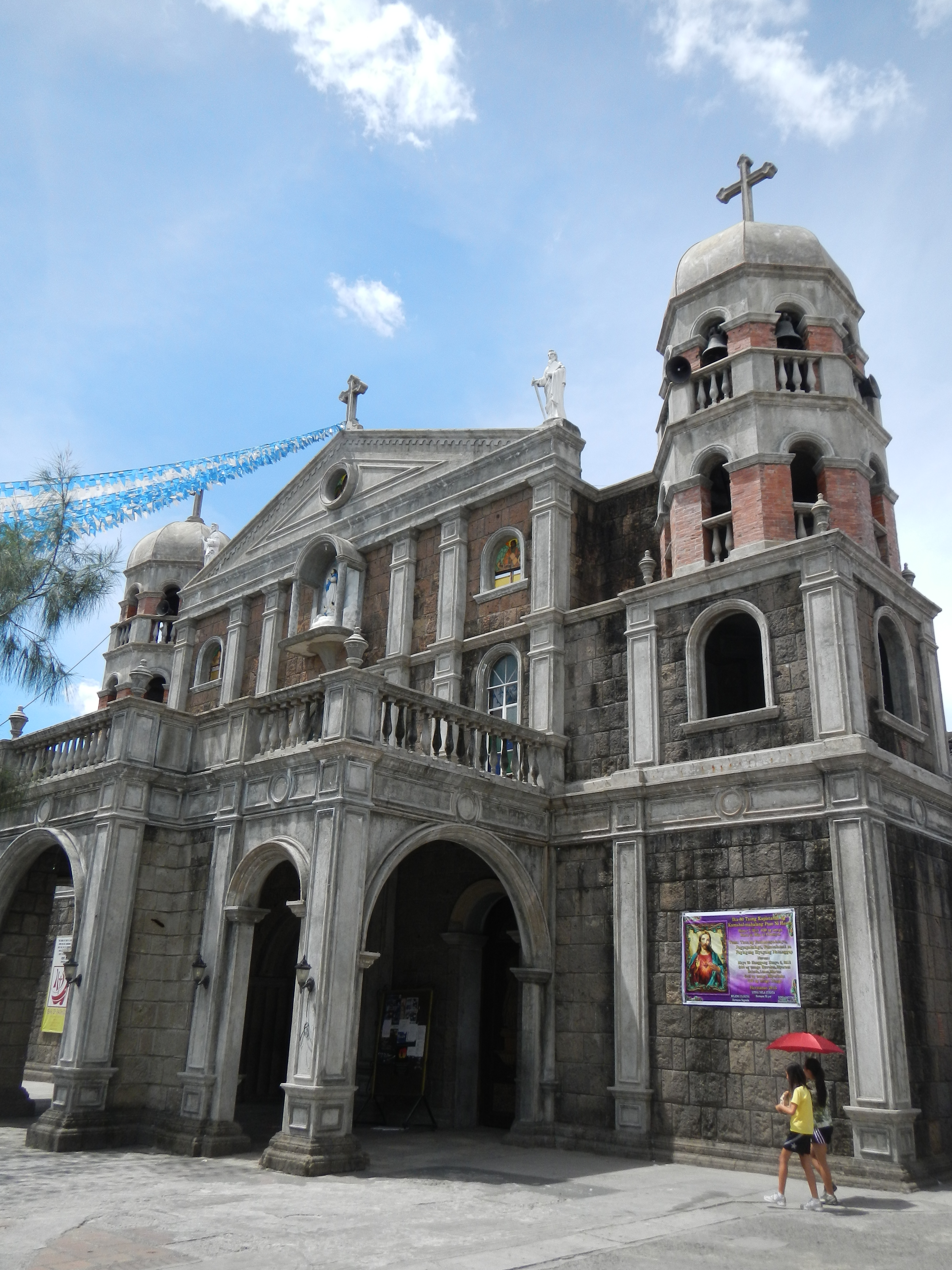
Immaculate Conception Parish Church of Dasmariñas

Christianity is the predominant faith, composed of Roman Catholics, Protestants, and other independent Christian groups.

The majority of the population are Roman Catholics. The city is the seat of the Vicariates of Immaculate Conception and Our Mother of Perpetual Help under the jurisdiction of Diocese of Imus.

Several Roman Catholic parishes in the city include the Immaculate Conception Parish in Poblacion, Our Mother of Perpetual Help Parish in DBB-A-3, and Our Lady of Fatima Parish in Salitran, among others.

Other prominent religious groups include Church of God World Missions, Philippines, and the local Church of God Dasmariñas, serve as the National Office of the Church of God based in Cleveland, Tennessee. Jesus Miracle Crusade International Ministry (Dasma Outstation, Iglesia ni Cristo, United Church of Christ in the Philippines (UCCP), Day by Day Christian Ministries, Jesus Is Lord Church (JIL), Evangelica Unida De Cristo, Victory Christian Fellowship, United Pentecostal Church (Phils), Inc., World Mission Church, The United Methodist Church, Herald of Grace Covenant Bible Church of Cavite, Presbyterian Churches, Baptist and Bible Fundamental churches, Seventh Day Adventist Churches, Members Church of God International known as Ang Dating Daan, The Lord's Hand Family Apostolic Church, and The Jesus People (TJP), also known as Jesusites.

A considerable percentage of the population is also composed of Muslims. This city has the largest number of Balik Islam 'reverts to Islam' community in the Philippines.

Religious tolerance exists among members of different sects.

=== Roman Catholic Parishes ===
The following Roman Catholic parishes in Dasmariñas are under the jurisdiction of the Diocese of Imus:

- Immaculate Conception Parish – Don Placido Campos Avenue, Zone IV (Poblacion)
- Our Lady of the Miraculous Medal Parish – Amuntay Road, Zone III (Poblacion)
- Our Lady of Fatima Parish – Salitran
- Ang Mabuting Pastol Parish – Sampaloc I (Pala-Pala)
- San Lorenzo Ruiz Parish – Summerwind Village IV, Burol Main
- St. Paul the Apostle Parish – Langkaan I
- Our Mother of Perpetual Help Parish – San Manuel II (DBB-A-3)
- Pope St. Paul VI Parish – Winward Hills Subdivision, Burol I
- Sacred Heart of Jesus Parish – San Simon (DBB‑C)
- St. Mary Euphrasia Parish – Santa Cruz I (DBB‑E)
- Hesus Nazareno Parish – Luzviminda II (DBB‑D)
- Kristong Hari Parish – Paliparan III
- Mary Immaculate Parish – Salawag
- Pope St. John XXIII Parish – San Marino City, Salawag

=== Languages ===
The city has a majority of English and Tagalog speakers. Almost all households in the city are bilingual and know how to speak English. Due to its proximity to Metro Manila and being part of the Greater Manila Area, there is also a considerably minor number of speakers of Bicolano, Ilocano, Ilonggo, Cebuano, Pangasinan, Kapampangan and Chavacano.

== Cityscape ==
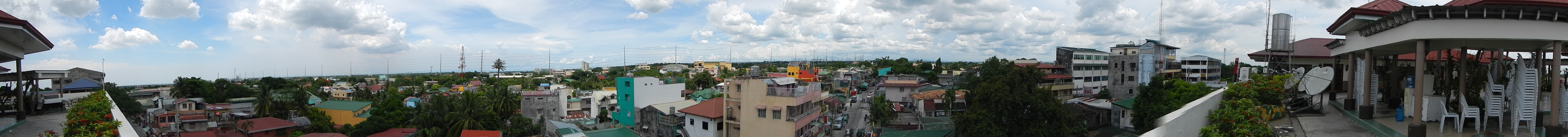
City panorama from Dasma Hall penthouse

=== Barangays ===
The City of Dasmariñas is divided into 11 unofficial administrative districts and further subdivided into 75 barangays. Each barangay is composed of puroks, and some also include sitios.

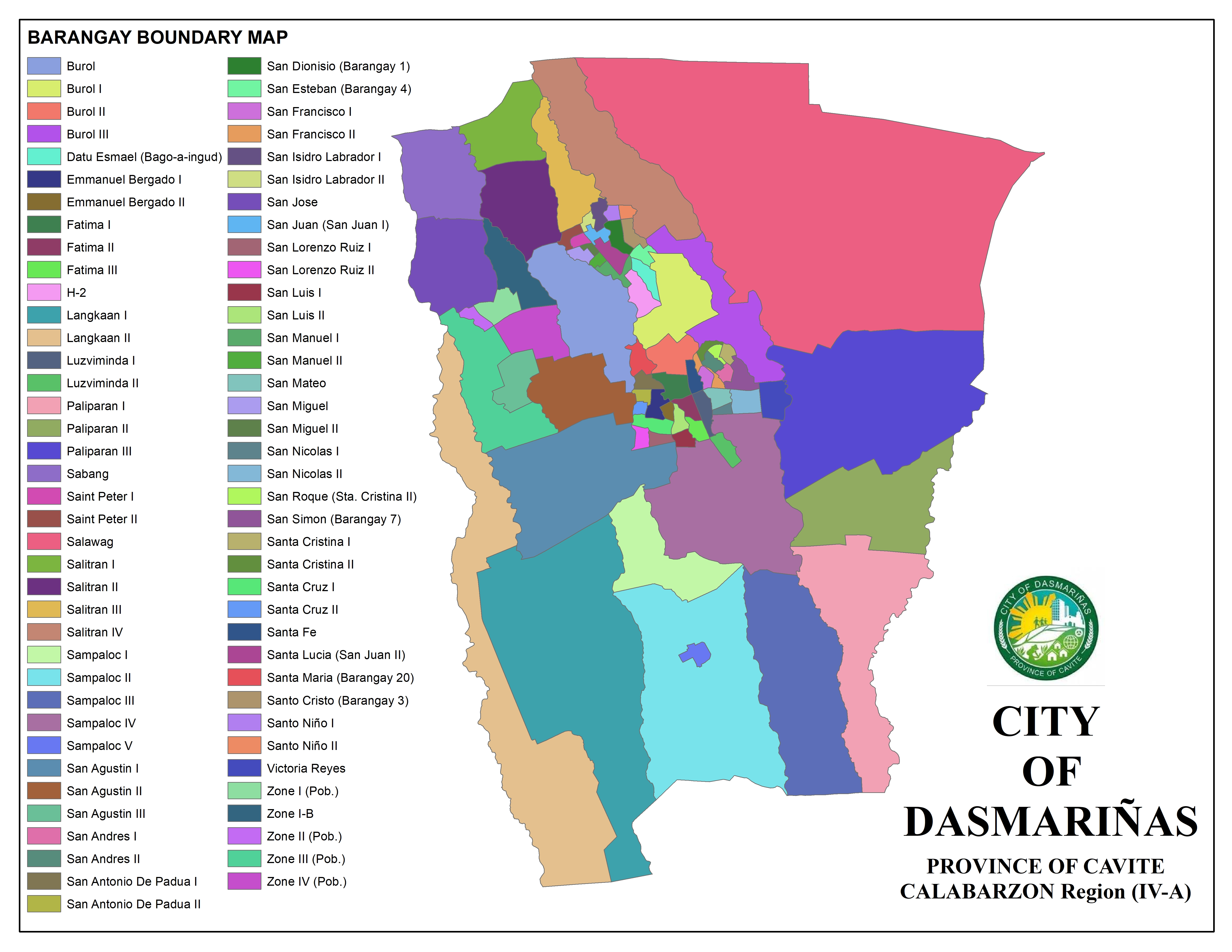
The map of the whole City of Dasmariñas, including barangay borders

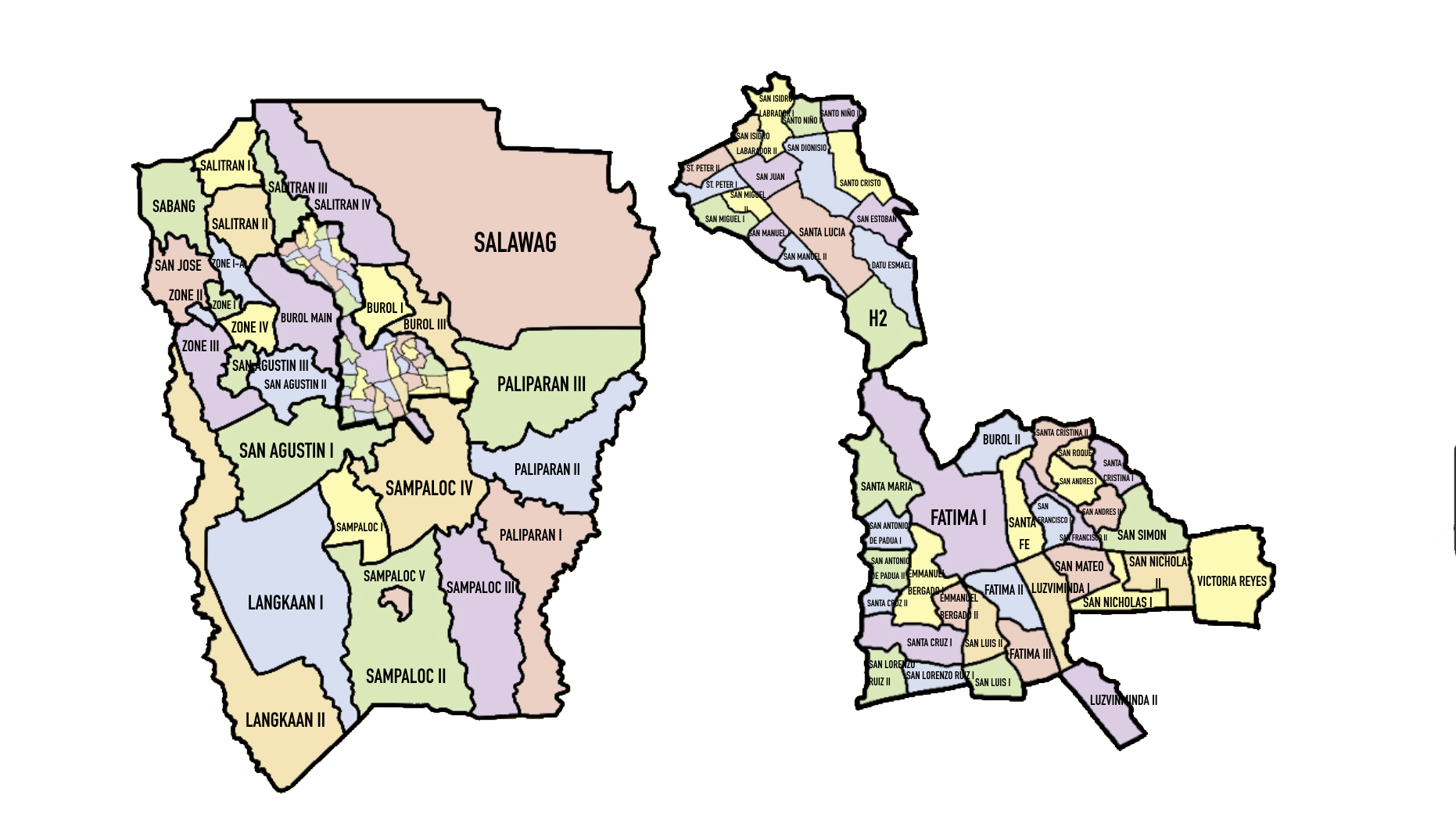
A barangay map showing the barangays of Dasmariñas City

==== Poblacion ====
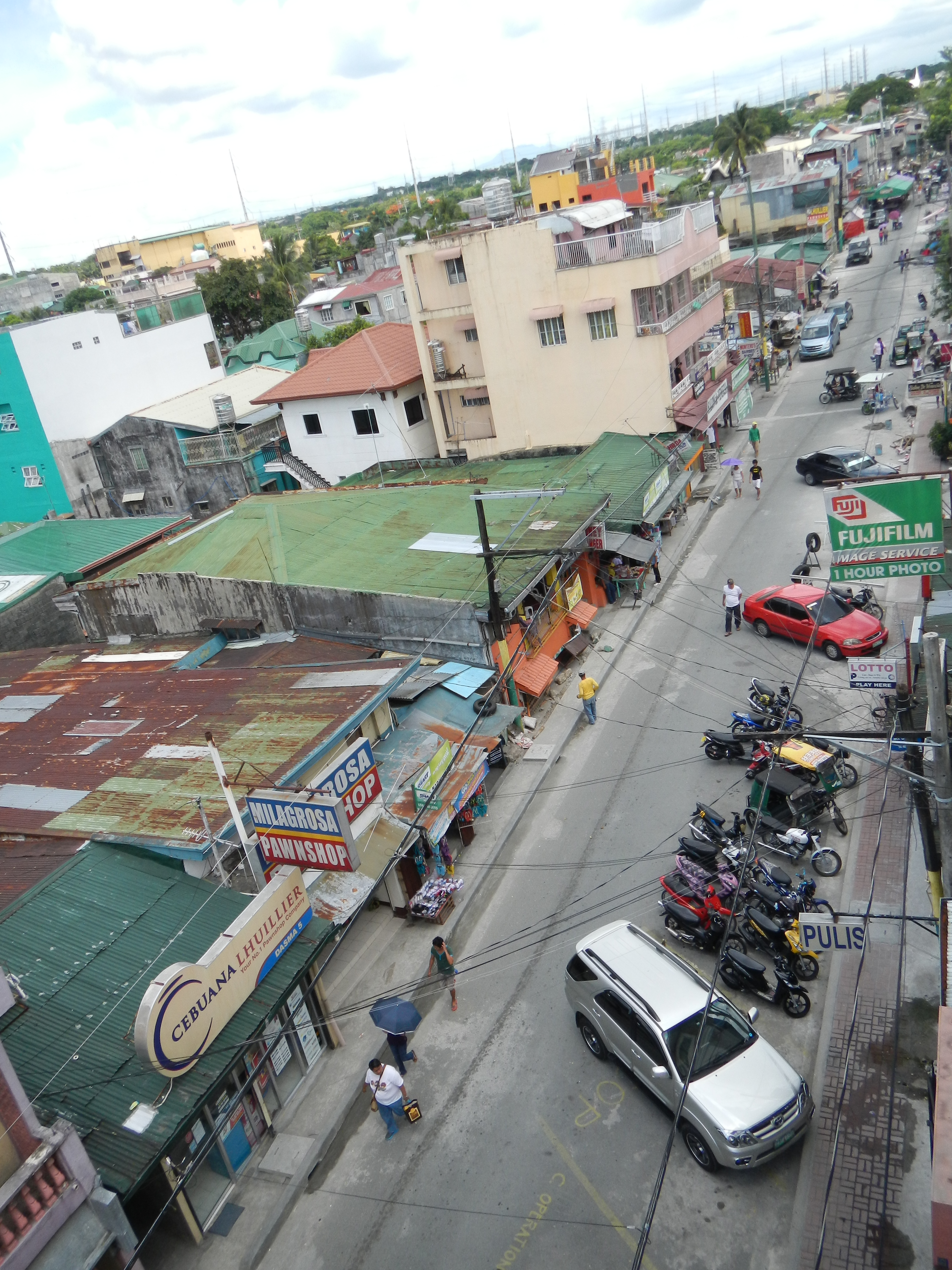
Poblacion

The Poblacion serves as the city center and is home to the long-standing residents of Dasmariñas. Located within the town plaza are the renovated church of the Parish of Our Lady of the Immaculate Conception, the Dasmariñas Library, Dasmariñas Elementary School, and the Immaculate Conception Academy-Science High School. The municipio, or town hall, is situated a few meters from the plaza. Also near the Poblacion are the De La Salle University-Health Sciences Campus and the DLSU Medical Center, the first ISO-certified hospital in the Philippines.

Divided into four zones, the city center is primarily a residential area scattered with various business establishments. The plaza serves as a center for celebrations, shows, and public gatherings. Every December 8, the Poblacion celebrates the Solemnity of the Immaculate Conception, an event marked by colorful banners, marching bands, and firework displays that attract visitors from across the province of Cavite. Due to the frequency of its cultural shows and weekly festivities, the city is often referred to as "The Liveliest City in Cavite."

The Poblacion serves as a major economic and educational center, housing the majority of the city's institutional, commercial, and thrift banks, alongside many schools.

The district is composed of five barangays:

- Zone I
- Zone I-A (the "A" denotes its location along Aguinaldo Highway)
- Zone II
- Zone III
- Zone IV

==== San Agustin ====
Originally named Kasuyan during the Spanish colonial period due to an abundance of cashew trees, the area was later known as Luksuhin. On July 18, 1889, it was renamed San Agustin following a petition by Don Juan Bautista. Geographically, the district lies between the Poblacion and Sampaloc to the north and is known by its large land and mango trees. During the Spanish period, a continuous water flow known as the Simbro ran from Bucal to the Poblacion.

On December 17, 1944, three residents (Conrado Aledia, Primitivo Sango, and Matiaga Ramirez) were killed during a sona (zonification) in the Poblacion. Historically, farming was the main source of income, as San Agustin is possesses rich soil suitable for rice, fruits, sugarcane, and vegetables. In recent years, however, much of the land has been converted into residential subdivisions and commercial establishments.

Currently, the area is undergoing development. Business establishments in the district include Vista Mall Dasmariñas and several automotive dealerships, namely Kia, JAC Motors, and Nissan Dasmariñas The district also contains the Aguinaldo Commercial Complex and the National Grid Corporation of the Philippines (NGCP) Dasmariñas Substation.

The district also has a township estate in Barangay San Agustin I, which is known as Idesia City Dasmariñas. A 37-hectare partnership between PA Properties and Hankyu Hanshin Corp., it comprises commercial spaces, retail stores, BPO offices, a supermarket, and residential structures including mid-rise condominiums and subdivisions.

A new condominium project, Green 3 Residences Dasmariñas, is planned for San Agustin III, located at the corner of Aguinaldo Highway and Daño Street.

The district is composed of three barangays:

- San Agustin I
- San Agustin II
- San Agustin III

==== San Jose ====
The district is situated between the Poblacion and Sabang. On April 13, 1889, a petition was filed to elevate the area (then known as Sitio Tamban) to the status of a barangay. The request was granted on July 18, 1889, and the community was renamed San Jose in honor of its patron saint, St. Joseph. Historically, the area was home to the Cumpuerta, a deep water canal that was a hideout for Filipino revolutionaries during the war against Spain; this canal remains in existence today. The first families of the district include the Cantada, Villena, Reyes, Mendoza, Camañag, Ramos, and Pastor lineages.

In the modern era, San Jose possesses numerous subdivisions and schools.

This district consists of a single namesake barangay, Barangay San Jose.

==== Salitran ====
Salitran has been known by its current name since the Spanish colonial period, though no definitive historical accounts exist regarding its origin. Some suggest the name refers to the backgrounds of its early settlers, who migrated from Pampanga, the Visayas, the Tagalog region, and China to serve the Spanish friars. However, according to the original settlers, the area was initially called Bayanan, described as a "small town" due to its numerous large Spanish-style houses.

An old house in eastern Salitran, known as the Makina, served as a granary for the Spanish friars and a headquarters for the Guardia Civil. During the Philippine Revolution, the Makina became a target for revolutionaries from the Poblacion and the surrounding barrio. On March 7, 1897, Spanish forces moved into Salitran to fight the Magdalo soldiers led by General Emilio Aguinaldo. Supported by a reinforcement of one thousand men, Aguinaldo’s forces successfully repelled the Spanish troops led by General José de Lachambre. In retaliation, the Spanish forces burned the barrio, leaving only three houses standing. Later, during World War II, residents Simplicio Lara and Teodorico Timbang were killed by Japanese soldiers.

Currently, Salitran is undergoing rapid development due to the proliferation of numerous subdivisions and villages. The district is home to schools such as West Hill Academy, Colegio de Salitran, St. Jude College, and the Immaculate Conception Academy-North Campus. The area also possesses multiple commercial structures, including Central Mall Dasmariñas and a concentration of automotive dealerships such as Toyota, Mitsubishi, Hyundai, Suzuki, and Honda Dasmariñas. Emilio Aguinaldo College (EAC) Medical Center is also located within the district.

The district is composed of four barangays:

- Salitran I
- Salitran II
- Salitran III
- Salitran IV

==== Sabang ====
This barangay can be found on the northern part of Dasmariñas. The word "Sabang" means "to overflow", and the creeks running from Malagasang, Imus tend to flood in this area. The Spanish friars irrigated the vast rice fields of this barangay. This diversion in the direction of the water flow vastly changed agriculture during the Spanish period with rich production of rice crops in this area. A bodega was made here for the storage of rice and was called the "Kamalig ng Pare" (Silo of the Priest). Sabang is considered to be the richest land in Dasmariñas. Residents here were known to be industrious. Although agriculture is still a source of income in this barangay, it has diminished due to the development of agrarian lands into subdivisions and schools for children. More than 85% of the population are professionals and have a high standard of living. The Madona Charity Clinic is located in Sabang, and it is owned by Mrs. Bracia Tengko. This clinic provides aid and relief to the less fortunate residents seeking medical help. At the back of the Madona Clinic was a Rock with a Spring of Water (Bucal ng Tubig) at the Ylang-Ylang River. It was believed to have healing properties or cause miracles. In 2007 Land Transportation Office LTO Dasmarinas District Office were established from the sponsorship and pioneering efforts of a wealthy landowner and business woman Mrs. Carmelita Carungcong Canete to accommodate the growing number of cars & motors in the city.

This area is also the birthplace of a Caviteno robinhood folk hero Leonardo Manicio, also known as "Nardong Putik".

Only one barangay is located in this district, its namesake, Barangay Sabang.

==== Burol ====
On the eastern part of Dasmariñas, we can find Barangay Burol which is 3 kilometers (1.9 mi) away from the city center. The complete name of barrio Burol is Pansol-Burol. Pansol is a Tagalog word meaning aqueduct, while Burol, also a native word, means mound. Even though there are no historical records about its establishment, it is safe to say that it was formed during the Spanish period due to the presence of ruins of old Spanish houses and sugarmills. The Quillao and Beltran families were the first to settle in this place. This barangay became the hide-out of the Katipuneros/revolucionarios. During the Japanese occupation, there are some Dasmarineños who were killed here. They were Alfredo Purificacion, Pedro Calupad, Jose Yñota, Victor de Jesus and Angel Olaes. The Japanese soldiers also planted several cotton trees on the area.

Now, this place is considered one of the richest barangay in Dasmariñas City because of the influx of commercial and business establishments in the area. Many schools and colleges can be found here such as the Southern Luzon College, International English Center, CavSU Learning Center Dasmariñas City and many others. Adjacent to the barangay is Emilio Aguinaldo College. Numerous subdivisions and villages are also located in this area. There are also low rise and high rise condominiums found here, such as Ivy League Residences, The One Dasmariñas Place and SMDC Green 2 Residences Dasmariñas.

Governor Dominador Mangubat Avenue (formerly known as congressional road) is also found here. This road is a tree lined urban corridor, and it is famous for businesses like residential condominiums, pharmacies, clinics, bars, restaurants, salons, spas and others. It also houses several universities and colleges, bestowing the area as the University Belt of Cavite.

The New Dasmariñas Government Center is located on this Barangay. This development includes Kolehiyo ng Lungsod ng Dasmariñas (KLD), Grandstand, Football field with track oval, City Of Dasmariñas Arena (COD Arena), City of Dasmariñas Boxing Gym and the new City of Dasmariñas Socio Economic and Multi purpose Building (New City Hall) The new urban public park named Promenade Des Dasmariñas is nearby situated along the Imus river. Soon it will have a commercial establishments and new development within the new government complex.

There are four barangays is located in this district, which are:

Burol Main Burol I Burol II Burol III

==== Langkaan ====
This area is located on the south-western part of Dasmariñas. The name "Langkaan" came from the word "langka" meaning jackfruit; which is believed to be planted in many parts of this barangay in 1900, the year it was founded. Barangay Langkaan was a part of a vast hacienda during the Spanich period and there are numerous water systems for rice fields that can be found here. The San Agustin Dam was constructed in 1855. On the last part of the 19th century, the Spaniards erected an indigo plantation here. The stone-made grinder of indigo still exists and it is the mark of the Spanish influence on the area. The Spaniards are the first who planted sugar cane, which became the primary source of income during the 18th century. During that time, tarapiche and carabaos are used to make panucha and paldo. Don Placido Campos and Andres Medina owned these tarapiche. When the Americans arrived, this area attracted residents from the Poblacion. The Quillao, Bautista, Sarabusab, Reyes, Remulla, Sango, Laudato, Empeño, Satsatin, Medina, de Lima and other families moved here during those times. During the Second World War, the Japanese had a big plantation of cotton trees in Langkaan. Dasmarineños were forced to work here. A Japanese concentration camp was also established in this area.

Langkaan is considered to be the backbone of the economic progress of Dasmariñas City. There are numerous factories here, such as Monterey Cavite Meat Plant, First Cityland Heavy Industrial Center and the First Cavite Industrial Estate. There are also other business establishments here like commercial banks and fast food chains that serve the workers living in Dasmariñas and other towns of Cavite as well.

Dasmariñas LGU built and established a government facility in Langkaan including the Molecular Diagnostic Laboratory, Mega Isolation Facility and Dasmariñas City Agricultural Office.

There are schools and colleges within the area such as Immaculate Conception Academy south, St. Francis Academy and St.Paul Technological Institute of Cavite. St. Paul Parish Church and Qubo Qabana Resorts are also found here.

Two barangays are located in this district, these are:

- Langkaan I
- Langkaan II

==== Paliparan ====
Paliparan is situated at the southeastern part of Dasmariñas. In the easternmost part, is surrounded by the municipalities of Gen. Mariano Alvarez, Cavite and San Pedro, Laguna. This area was grassy with no trees growing on its wide space. Its name – paliparan – references the area being well-suited for flying kites. During the Spanish period, the Spaniards used to go to this place during weekends to fly kites of different designs and colors. The first settlers here came from the town of Imus. Among them are the families of Faustino Alvarez, Flaviano Pakingan, Gregorio de la Cruz, Pablo Papa, Dominguez and Martinez. In 1911, most of the residents here were said to be uneducated because there were only eight people who could vote. During the Spanish period, this place became a hiding place for the Katipuneros/revolucionarios. During the Japanese occupation, some hide-outs of the guerillas were found here such as of "P.Q.O.G., R.C.T.C. Hunters, Reyes Regimen and Saulog Regimen". In June 1943, the Japanese ordered the residents to assemble in front of the school where they were not given food and water from morning until evening. Suspected guerrilla members were killed.

This barangay is sub-divided into six sitios which are Nyugan (on the west), Pintong Gubat, Paliparan Site (on the north), Paliparan Ilaya (also on the north), Pook and Burol (on the north-east).

Today, it is considered to be one of the richest district in Dasmariñas City, because of the industrial estates and factories that found here. Among them are the Pepsi Cola Philippines Sales Office Dasmariñas, Reynold's Corporation, Molave Industrial Estate, Dasmariñas TechnoPark and many others.

There will be a township development by Vista Estate Company within Barangay Paliparan 1, named as Praverde Dasmariñas that houses a commercial strip, a supermarket, retail store, coffee shop, events place, hotel and Residentials such as Subdivision and MidRise Condominiums.

Three barangays are located in this district, these are:

- Paliparan I
- Paliparan II
- Paliparan III

==== Salawag ====
Barangay Salawag is the largest barangay of the city in terms of land area and population. It is located in the north-eastern part of Dasmariñas. It is bounded by the cities of Imus and Bacoor in the north, the cities of Muntinlupa and Las Piñas to the northeast, and the city of San Pedro in east side. This place was named due to the presence of bamboo trees (salawag in archaic Tagalog) which were used for the construction of houses. This barangay had many names during the olden times. The Spanish called this "Pasong Tinta" because there were many plants called "tinta-tintahan" used to make ink. This area was also called "Horong Bato" because the early settlers believed that there is a treasure here buried under a large rock. During the arrival of the Americans, the place was called "Mataas na Sampalok" because there were numerous tall sampaloc (tamarind) trees planted here. The first families to live here were the Macalinao, Pacifico, Purificacion, Topacio and Paras families; while the richest families living here were the Acuzar, Panerio and Muncada families. Only one barangay is located in this district, its namesake, Barangay Salawag.

Today, this place is considered one of the richest barangay in Dasmariñas. The Orchard Golf and Country Club was the site of the 1995 Johnnie Walker Golf Tournament. A state university, the Technological University of the Philippines – Cavite Campus, was established in 1979 along with Cavite School of Life Dasmariñas Campus. Many subdivisions and villages are also located here, such as Golden City, San Marino City, Avida Santa Catalina Village, Avida Sta Cecilia Village, Avida Residences Dasmariñas, Filinvest Subdivision Dasmariñas, Orchard Estates and The Courtyard Vermosa. Many Commercial establishments can be found here that includes Ayala's, The District Mall Dasmariñas, Vista All Home Salawag, SM Savemore Salawag and SM Savemore San Marino and a large commercial strip along Salawag - Paliparan road. Also located in this barangay is Elijah Hotel and Residences.

Salawag is also unique among the barangays in the city as it has two Catholic churches serving its huge population. The first one established was Mary Immaculate Parish in NIA Road, built in 2003 under the pastoral care of the Sons of the Holy Mary Immaculate. This church is also the home of Salawag's patroness, Maria Inmaculada de Salawag, whose image is reported to be miraculous and was Episcopally Crowned on December 8, 2018 by the Bishop of Imus, Most Rev. Reynaldo G. Evangelista. The second church was Pope John XXIII Parish in San Marino City, established in 2016.

Two townships led by two of the country's largest real estate companies, Ayala Land's Vermosa and Vista Land's Villar City, include areas under the jurisdiction of Barangay Salawag.

==== Sampaloc ====
The name for this area came from numerous sampaloc (English: tamarind) trees. Sampaloc has the largest land area in Dasmariñas City. Today, this area is considered one of the richest districts and economic zones in Dasmariñas. The families of Dela Cuesta, Licot, Virata, Purificacion, Alvaran, Beltran, Villanueva, Atienza, Tagle and Joson were the first settlers of this barrio.

This area includes the Central Business District. Two major shopping malls can be found here: SM City Dasmariñas and Robinson's Dasmariñas. Many business establishments are located in the area like pharmacies, clinics, restaurants, convenience stores, banks, hardware stores, fast food chains and even offices.

Sitios formed here in 1896 include Pala-Pala, Bukal, Malinta, Manalo, Piela and Talisayan. The Philippine Christian University Dasmariñas, Union Theological Seminary and the National University Dasmariñas are located in Pala-Pala. Stanley Electric Phils. Inc. is located in Malinta and more than half of the land is owned by the International Institute of Rural Reconstruction. EuroMed Laboratories, Yakult Philippines and New Era Village of Iglesia ni Cristo (Church of Christ) are in Bucal. PhilFlex and Meralco depot are located in Talisayan. There are many subdivisions and villages in this area, including Greenwoods, MetroGate Estate, La Mediterranean, Washington Place, St. Charbel South and many more. There are also many factories located in this district such as Syndenham Laboratories Inc., Coca-Cola Bottlers Phils. Inc. and Miescor Builders Inc.

IQOR Dasmariñas is the first New York based office in the city, located in SM City Dasmariñas and Robinson's Dasmariñas.

Five barangays are located in this district, these are:

- Sampaloc I (Pala-Pala)
- Sampaloc II (Bucal/Malinta)
- Sampaloc III (Manalo/Piela)
- Sampaloc IV (Talisayan)
- Sampaloc V (New Era)

==== Dasmariñas Bagong Bayan ====
Dasmariñas Bagong Bayan (DBB) was established in 1975 under the government of Pres. Ferdinand Marcos. At first, it occupied 234 hectares (580 acres) of land in the city and is 8 kilometers (5.0 mi) away from the city center. This land was bought by the People Homesite Housing Corporation (the PHHC) from the previous owners at two million and four hundred thousand pesos (P2,400,000) which then became the resettlement area for the less-privileged families living in the depressed areas of Metro Manila. The families of Eduardo Coronel, Rogelio Tomas, Ruben Alvarez, Manuel Rabang, Aurora Dela Cruz and Diosdado Alto were the first ones to live here. Diosdado Alto, Rodolfo Urubia, Danilo Serrano, Maximo Esteban, Manuel Macuto and Francisco Gonzales became the first barangay leaders.

After a few years, DBB was divided into 30 barangays with a population of 100,000 living in more than 600 hectares (1,500 acres) of land. Each family was given 90 to 200 square meters (970 to 2,150 sq ft) which they loaned from the National Housing Authority (the NHA). On September 12, 1990, the Sangguniang Bayan (Municipal Council) passed Order 108-90 ordering DBB to be divided into 47 barangays and was approved by the authority.

The Congressional Avenue is lined with numerous schools and business establishments. SM Market Mall Dasmariñas and Kadiwa market offers goods at cheaper prices which then serve as alternative markets for the city. There are also fast food chains and another shopping center named Ventura Mall Dasmariñas. Schools such as the Dasmariñas II Central School and Dasmariñas Integrated High School are near the market. Along the said avenue sits the De La Salle University-Dasmariñas Campus.

Aside from schools and institutions, there are many public markets, churches and business establishments around the area. Also found here are St. Paul Hospital and Pagamutan Ng Dasmariñas, as well as Dasmariñas City Library and Dasmariñas City Schools Division Office.

Today this district has the most number of Barangays: 49.

- DBB-A-1
  - San Dionisio
  - San Esteban
  - Santo Cristo
  - Santo Niño I
  - Santo Niño II
- DBB-A-2
  - San Juan
  - Santa Lucia
- DBB-A-3
  - San Manuel I
  - San Manuel II
  - San Miguel I
  - San Miguel II
  - St. Peter I
  - St. Peter II
- DBB-B
  - Burol I
  - Burol II
- DBB-C
  - Burol III
  - San Andres I
  - San Andres II
  - San Roque
  - San Simon
  - Santa Cristina I
  - Santa Cristina II
  - Victoria Reyes
- DBB-D
  - Luzviminda I
  - Luzviminda II
  - San Nicolas I
  - San Nicolas II
  - San Mateo
- DBB-E
  - Emmanuel Bergado I
  - Emmanuel Bergado II
  - San Lorenzo Ruiz I
  - San Lorenzo Ruiz II
  - San Luis I
  - San Luis II
  - Santa Cruz I
  - Santa Cruz II
- DBB-F
  - Fatima I
  - Fatima II
  - Fatima III
- DBB-G
  - San Isidro Labrador I
  - San Isidro Labrador II
- DBB-H
  - H-2 (Santa Veronica)
  - Datu Esmael (H-1)
- DBB-I
  - Santa Fe
  - San Francisco I
  - San Francisco II
- DBB-J
  - San Antonio de Padua I
  - San Antonio de Padua II
  - Santa Maria

== Economy ==
Poverty incidence of Dasmariñas (%)

Source: Philippine Statistics Authority

The city of Dasmariñas is one of the fastest growing local government units in the province of Cavite and in CALABARZON region. Numerous commercial and retail establishments, which include major shopping malls, fast food chains, groceries, supermarkets, convenience stores, banks, clinics, restaurants, retail store, hardwares and other service-oriented businesses, are mostly concentrated in the City Center and Central Business District. Industrial establishments are located in the outskirts of the city. It has the greatest number of universities in the province.

From an agricultural-based economy, the town of Dasmariñas has evolved into a highly urbanized, commercialized, industrialized and financialized city. It now boasts of three industrial estates, namely: First Cavite Industrial Estate (FCIE) in Barangay Langkaan, Dasmariñas Technopark located in Barangay Paliparan I and NHA Industrial Park in Bagong Bayan. Aside from these industrial areas, there are 240 other factories/business establishments scattered in the different barangays that sum up to 309 operational industries in the city. Dasmariñas is home to hundreds of thousands of residents who occupy more than 180 residential subdivisions and villages in the city. It also serves as a haven to investors with its industrial estates and diverse pool of manpower. The rapid growth of the city's population near universities, industrial estates and factories provides a ready market for real estate ventures such as subdivisions, condominiums, hotels, apartments and other support services. Its infrastructure projects involving construction of major road widening, support the city in its functional role as one of the residential, commercial, industrial, financial and university centers of Cavite. To protect its environment, Dasmariñas has adopted its Luntiang (English: Green) Dasmariñas program, which is envisioned to plant 100,000 seedlings planted over the town during the year 2000.

In 2012, the city posted PHP 1,137,968,919 in income, with 37% of it (PHP 420,844,216) sourced locally.

According to the 2006 Commission on Audit report the City of Dasmariñas is the wealthiest local government unit in the province of Cavite. In addition to that, Dasmariñas was the only municipality in the Philippines that had both SM and Robinsons malls prior to its conversion into a city.

=== Commerce ===
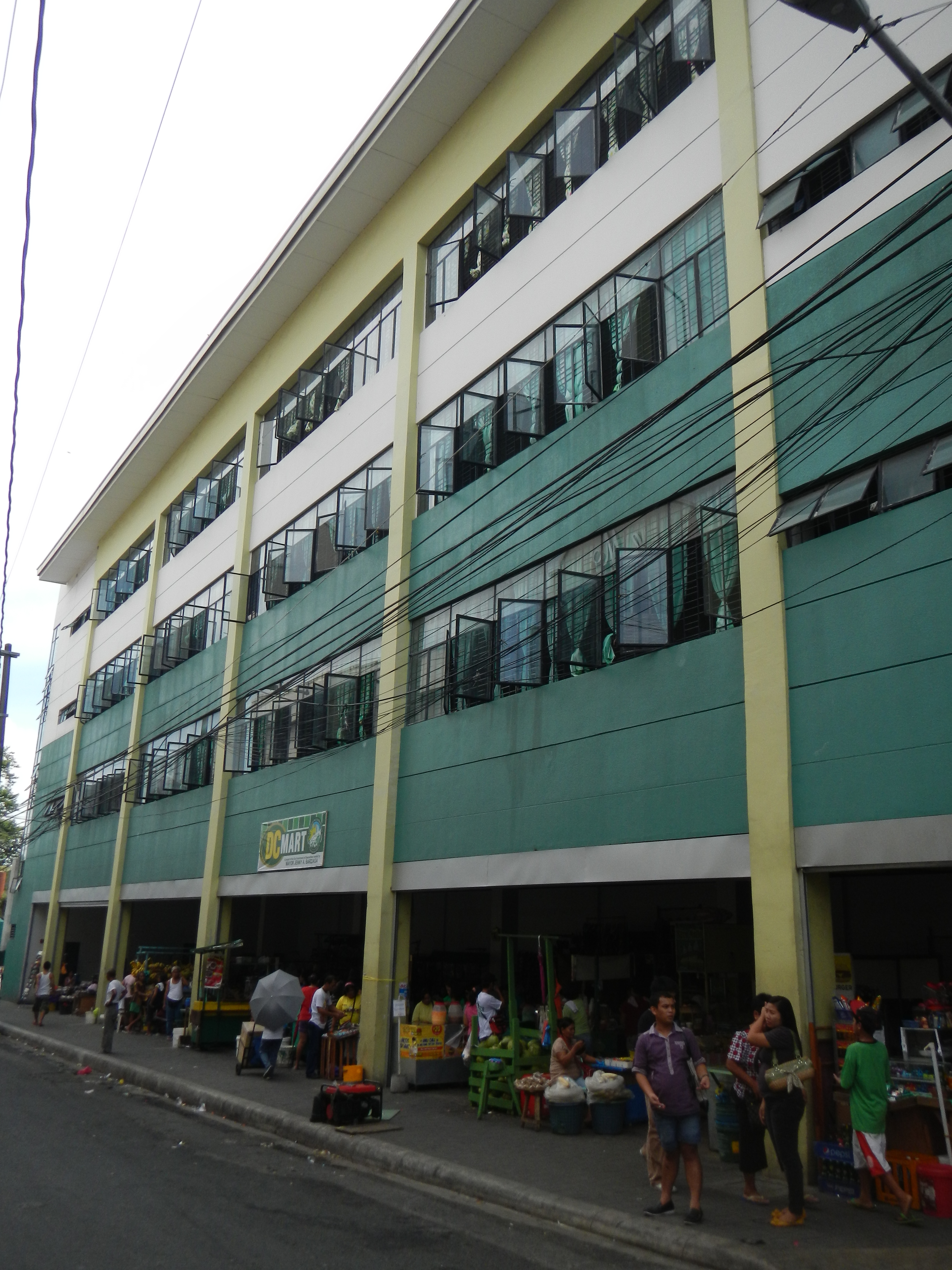
Dasmariñas Public market

Commerce and trade transactions are intensively undertaken in the identified commercial areas along Don Placido Campos Avenue, Camerino Avenue, Governor's Drive Emilio Aguinaldo Highway, Jose Abad Santos Avenue, Carlos Trinidad Avenue, Salawag-Paliparan Road, Gov.Mangubat Avenue, Congressional Avenue, Congressional Road, Fatima Road, Amuntay Road, Langkaan Road and other areas particularly in Barangay Paliparan and in Dasmariñas Bagong Bayan.

Commercial establishments are lined along major thoroughfares. A strip pattern of commercial growth are evident at other Barangays in Dasmariñas City.

Commercial developments along Aguinaldo Highway from Silang to Pala-Pala junction particularly within areas adjacent to Congressional Avenue and Salitran shows the nature and extent of commercial activities in Dasmariñas City. The presence of local commercial centers or shopping centers such as the Highway Plaza Mall, CM Plaza Mall and a branch of a Metro Manila-based shopping center, the Walter Mart which houses different local and nationwide known commercial establishments sets the trend of commercial developments in that part of the city. These are further enhanced by the presence of banks, financial centers and other business establishments. There are also commercial establishments supportive off or are offshoots of the educational and medical services being rendered by the De La Salle University Medical Center and the Dr. Jose P. Rizal National Medical Research Center. These makes the area a financial and commercial district of the city.

The old commercial developments within the Poblacion area (Zone I, I-A, II, III and IV) provides for the needs of the old town residents and the subdivision migrants on the Southern portion of the city. The nature of commercial activity being that off a neighborhood commercial center supports the daily needs of the population. The new location of the public market opens the city to the neighboring marketing population of other settlement areas. It likewise make the public market accessible to all the population both from the resettlement areas and the old townsite. Thus, the financial and commercial activity in Poblacion, Dasmariñas City Central Market, NSN Mall Dasma (Highway Plaza Mall), Volets Commercial Mall, Antler's square, CM Plaza Mall, Old Kadiwa Market, DC Mart, The Dasmariñas Commercial Complex, MetroGate Commercial Complex, Terraza Dasmariñas enhance the commercial center role of Dasmariñas City.

=== Shopping Malls ===
SM City Dasmariñas, the biggest mall in Cavite and one of several large shopping malls in the province.

This is the list of Shopping Malls in Dasmariñas:

- SM City Dasmariñas
- SM MarketMall Dasmariñas
- The District Dasmariñas
- WalterMart Dasmariñas
- Unitop Dasmariñas
- Central Mall Dasmariñas
- Vista Mall Dasmariñas
- Ventura Mall Dasmariñas
- Robinsons Dasmariñas
- LCC Mall Dasmariñas (soon for under construction)
- Waltermart Dasmariñas Paliparan (soon to open)

=== Industry ===
Dasmariñas is an Industrial City. Dubbed as Industrial Giant of Cavite The growth has been greatly influenced by its proximity to Metro Manila and the national government's industrial boom. It becomes the choice location for business enterprises being in a crossroad of development south of Manila.

Industrial developments along the Governor's Drive (Carmona-Ternate Road) specifically the First Cavite Industrial Estate, the Reynold's Phils. and different industries dotting the road from Carmona and Silang boundaries to General Trias as well as those at the southeastern portion of Aguinaldo Highway providing employment and livelihood opportunities to the locals. Taxes are being paid by these industries help provide for the basic services and amenities of the city.

On the southwestern part of the city is First Cavite Industrial Estate, a 283-hectare (700-acre) industrial subdivision located at Langkaan provides adequate facilities to light/medium industries. It is a joint project of the National Development Company, Marubeni Corporation, and the Japan International Development Organization Ltd. Situated in Dasmariñas, the estate is complete with power supply, water system, and telecommunication facilities, with 1,500 lines. The estate includes a General Industrial Zone, which has a customs office and warehouse.

Preferred locators are those involved in non-pollutive small and medium-scale industries. Presently, 48 companies have located their businesses in First Cavite Industrial Estate.

The Dasmariñas Bagong Bayan – NHA Industrial Estate is about 8.6 hectares. The Local Waterworks Utilities Administration manages the water system. Its 18 pumps and its 18 elevated storage tanks, having an average capacity of 60,000 gallons each, can very well serve the needs of the occupants. Labor-intensive, export-oriented, non- hazardous, and non-pollutive industries are best situated in the area. GMA-NHA Industrial Estate The General Mariano Galvez – NHA Industrial Estate compromises 10 hectares of land in the municipality of Gen. Mariano Alvarez. Types of industries preferred for this estate are those, which are non-pollutive, labor-intensive, export-oriented, and non-hazardous such as the 6 companies that have located therein.

Dasmariñas Techno Park, A 38-hectare industrial estate located at Paliparan 1, City of Dasmariñas, Cavite wherein 13 companies are in full operation. Its development features include grand entrance gate with guard house and 24 hours security, perimeter fence, interconnected water supply system with two elevated water tanks, 3-phase electricity served by MERALCO, underground drainage system, concrete road network designed for industrial use, and administration building with business center. Telephone service providers and lots for commercial purposes are also available in this area.

This techno park is accessible in Governor's drive and via South Superhighway-Carmona Exit, via Aguinaldo Highway, Molino-Paliparan Road and Manila Southwoods Road.

Other Industrial Estates in Dasmariñas City are, Molave Industrial Estate in Paliparan 2 and First CityLand Heavy Industrial Estate in Langkaan 2.

=== Real Estate ===
In 2014, Vista Land launched Villar City (then Vista Alabang), a township of 2,500 hectares spanning areas of Muntinlupa, Las Piñas, Bacoor and Dasmariñas. Some notable projects here include a central business district, and a new University of the Philippines campus which will focus on technopreneurship. In 2023, Villar Avenue opened, serving as the spine road of the development and connecting De La Salle University - Dasmarinas in the west and Alabang in the northeast.

Meanwhile, Ayala Land established Vermosa, a 770-hectare township straddling the cities of Imus and Dasmariñas in 2015. The first residential project named The Courtyards is located in the city.

Other townships in development include the 37-hectare Idesia City by PA Properties located in San Agustin 1 and the 12-hectare Praverde by Vista Land located in Paliparan 1.

Highrises are also beginning to dot the city. At the moment there are three high-rise developments in Dasma, namely: The One Dasmariñas Place and SMDC Green 2 Residences in Gov. Mangubat Avenue; and Elijah Hotel and Residences in Salawag.

Other soon to rise developments are the Green 3 Residences Dasmariñas in Brgy San Agustin 3 and Washington Heights in Brgy Sampaloc 2, both along Aguinaldo Highway. Also Praverde Residences Brgy Paliparan 1 along Governor's Drive, Novus Prime Residences in Villar City Brgy Salawag and Newtowne Residences Dasmariñas in Anabu Road Brgy Burol Main.

=== Leisure ===
The Orchard Golf and Country Club in Jose Abad Santos Avenue located in Barangay Salawag.

== Government ==
=== Local Government ===
Dasmariñas has been a municipality and later a component city with a mayor-council form of government since its establishment in 1866.

The mayor is the chief executive of the city. He is elected to serve a three-year term, with a maximum of three terms. The incumbent city mayor is Third Barzaga, who succeeded his mother, now congressman, Jennifer Barzaga He served as the vice mayor from 2025 until 2026.

The vice mayor is the presiding officer of the Sangguniang Panglungsod ng Dasmariñas (English: City Council of Dasmariñas). He is also the chief executive of the city whenever the mayor is out of the city. He is elected to serve a three-year term, with a maximum of three terms. The incumbent vice mayor is Teofilo “Rudy” Lara, incumbent since 2026.

The Sangguniang Panglungsod ng Dasmariñas (English: City Council of Dasmariñas) is composed of 12 members with 2 ex officio members which are the Association of Liga ng mga Barangay ng Dasmariñas (English: League of Barangays of Dasmariñas) President and the Sangguniang Kabataan (English: Youth Council) Federation President. There are 20 committees in the city each headed by a chairman who is a city councilor. They are elected to serve a three-year term, with a maximum of three terms.

=== Elected Officials ===
The city officials from June 30, 2019, to June 30, 2022. They were elected last May 13, 2019, during the 2019 Philippine national and local elections, which since 2007, all candidates from the Barzaga's group (Team Dasma) sweep the Municipal/City council.

Position	Name
City Mayor of the City of Dasmariñas	Jennifer Barzaga
City Vice Mayor of the City of Dasmariñas	Raul Rex D. Mangubat
Councilors of the City of Dasmariñas	Teofilo B. Lara
Councilors of the City of Dasmariñas	Restituto M. Encabo
Councilors of the City of Dasmariñas	Robin Chester J. Cantimbuhan
Councilors of the City of Dasmariñas	Francisco A. Barzaga
Councilors of the City of Dasmariñas	Martin John T. Reyes
Councilors of the City of Dasmariñas	Nickanor N. Austria Jr.
Councilors of the City of Dasmariñas	Tagumpay P. Tapawan, D.M.D.
Councilors of the City of Dasmariñas	Angelo C. Hugo
Councilors of the City of Dasmariñas	Eric S. Aledia
Councilors of the City of Dasmariñas	Aquino I. Garcia
Councilors of the City of Dasmariñas	Mamerto B. Noora Jr.
Councilors of the City of Dasmariñas	Glenn Wynne S. Malihan
President of the League of Barangays: Dasmariñas Chapter	George Carlo Magno
President of the Youth Council Federation: Dasmariñas Chapter	Justine Mae V. Quillao

=== Municipal Presidents and Mayors ===
Except for lack of dates of the terms of the gobernadorcillos (also popularly referred to as captain) during the Spanish regime, the list of town heads of Dasmariñas is complete from its founding to the present.

Gobernadorcillos (1868–1895)

- Juan Ramirez
- Adriano Llano
- Eduardo Bautista
- Anastacio Paulme
- Valeriano Campos
- Eugenio Ambalada
- Ligario Malihan
- Leon Mangubat
- Lino Alcantara
- Fausto Bautista
- Gregorio Baustista

Capitan Municipal (1895–1896)

- Placido Campos, 1895–1896

Municipal Presidents (1900–1935)

- Francisco Barzaga, 1900
- Placido Campos, 1901

Municipal Presidents under Imus Government (1905–1916)

Effectivity of the law passed in 1901 combining the municipalities of Imus, Dasmariñas and Bacoor with its seat of government in Imus.

- Cesar A. Fontanilla, 1905–1913
- Felipe Topacio, 1912–1915
- Cecilio Kamantigue, 1915–1916

Municipal Presidents (1917–1948)

- Placido Campos, 1917–1918
- Felipe Tirona, 1919–1921
- Francisco Barzaga, 1922–1924
- Isidro Sanchez Mangubat, 1924–1928
- Emilio Aledia Ramirez, 1928–1931
- Col. Estanislao Mangubat Carungcong, 1931–1934
- Doroteo Jardiniano Mangubat, 1934–1937
- Teodorico Sarosario, 1937–1940
- Felicisimo Medina Carungcong, 1940–1945
- Maximo De la Torre, 1946, appointed
- Gaudencio Geda, 1946, appointed
- Fermin De la Cruz, 1947, appointed

Municipal Mayors (1948–2009)

- Arturo Sayoto Carungcong, 1948–1951
- Emiliano De la Cruz, 1951–1955
- Tomas Hembrador, 1956–1963
- Remigio Medina Carungcong, 1964–1972
- Narciso M. Guevarra, 1972–1982
- Recto Cantimbuhan, 1982–1986
- Elpidio Barzaga Jr., 1986–1987, appointed
- Mariano Veluz, March–November 1987 "appointed"
- Roberto Cantimbuhan, November–December 1987 "appointed"
- Leonardo Javier, January 13 – February 2, 1988 "appointed"
- Recto Cantimbuhan, 1988–1998
- Elpidio Barzaga Jr., 1998–2007
- Jennifer Austria-Barzaga, 2007–2009

City Mayors (2009–present)

- Jennifer Austria-Barzaga, 2009–2016, 2019–2026
- Elpidio Barzaga Jr., 2016–2019
- Third Barzaga, 2026–present

=== Barangays ===
Dasmariñas is politically subdivided into 75 barangays or villages. This table shows the barangays, barangay captains, SK chairmen and population of each barangay in Dasmariñas.

Barangay	District	Barangay Captain	Population (2020)	Area (km^{2})	Density (/km^{2})
Burol Main	Burol	John Derrick P. Mercado	11,902		
Burol I	Burol	Renilo M. Teves	17,287		
Burol II	Burol	Edwin C. Unlayao	6,025		
Burol III	Burol	Alma M. Lapno	10,921		
Datu Esmael (Bago-A-Ingud)	DBB-H	Pundarola M. Pagandag	7,969		
Emmanuel Bergado I	DBB-E	Alexander J. Ablang Jr.	8,002		
Emmanuel Bergado II	DBB-E	Eduardo R. Abejonar	2,796		
Fatima I	DBB-F	Garry N. Esteban	6,782		
Fatima II	DBB-F	Jamil B. Ibardolaza	4,305		
Fatima III	DBB-F	Ramir M. Dela Cruz	3,684		
Barangay H-2 (Santa Veronica)	DBB-H	John Renan I. Mendoza	12,000		
Langkaan I (Humayao)	Langkaan	Rommel Z. Sarabusab	26,939		
Langkaan II	Langkaan	Fernando T. Laudato	33,651		
Luzviminda I	DBB-D	Jeffrey D. Galit	3,565		
Luzviminda II	DBB-D	Julius M. Pacia	4,868		
Paliparan I	Paliparan	Ryan A. Sarimos	10,125		
Paliparan II	Paliparan	Rolando C. Ambal	20,804		
Paliparan III	Paliparan	Chrisanto C. Maya	72,945		
Sabang	Sabang	Kenneth S. Saria	17,329		
Salawag	Salawag	Enrico S. Paredes	78,778		
Saint Peter I	DBB-A-3	Cesario R. Hernandez Jr.	2,287		
Saint Peter II	DBB-A-3	Crisanto N. Ratin	2,471		
Salitran I	Salitran	Jennifer A. Potente	5,158		
Salitran II	Salitran	Marvin T. Alindog	12,337		
Salitran III	Salitran	Raul A. Ballos	15,396		
Salitran IV	Salitran	Prudencio R. España	11,819		
Sampaloc I (Pala-Pala)	Sampaloc	Melencio Licot Jr. "Badong"	7,662		
Sampaloc II (Bucal/Malinta)	Sampaloc	Virginia S. Campano	18,225		
Sampaloc III (Piela)	Sampaloc	Gregorio A. Upo	13,807		
Sampaloc IV (Talisayan/Bautista)	Sampaloc	Armando M. Movido	41,678		
Sampaloc V (New Era)	Sampaloc	Jose V. Padre	3,252		
San Agustin I	San Agustin	Darwin P. Torres	11,971		
San Agustin II (R. Tirona)	San Agustin	Fernando H. Narvaez	11,692		
San Agustin III	San Agustin	Jaime B. Hembrador	10,178		
San Andres I	DBB-C	Melchor T. Moya	4,259		
San Andres II	DBB-C	Virgilio N. Galura	3,405		
San Antonio De Padua I	DBB-J	Carter P. Manzano	3,407		
San Antonio De Padua II	DBB-J	Fernando D.C. Muli	3,062		
San Dionisio	DBB-A-1	Mercy L. Zablan	6,741		
San Esteban	DBB-A-1	Noel Y. Dela Cruz	4,583		
San Francisco I	DBB-I	Virgilio D. Delfin	3,099		
San Francisco II	DBB-I	Arnulfo M. Fatalla	3,363		
San Isidro Labrador I	DBB-G	Robert R. Rillo	4,834		
San Isidro Labrador II	DBB-G	Roderick C. Olaes	2,463		
San Jose	San Jose	Jeffrey N. Frani	11,925		
San Juan	DBB-A-2	Atanacio G. Cantimbuhan Jr.	3,667		
San Lorenzo Ruiz I	DBB-E	Roldan M. Viajedor	3,311		
San Lorenzo Ruiz II	DBB-E	Morlito S. Asebias	4,275		
San Luis I	DBB-E	Henry P. Omillo	3,963		
San Luis II	DBB-E	Mildred F. Patalbo	4,336		
San Manuel I	DBB-A-3	Rommel R. Ros	2,822		
San Manuel II	DBB-A-3	Jeffrey Z. Espineli	2,581		
San Mateo	DBB-D	Isaias C. Villanueva	4,950		
San Miguel I	DBB-A-3	Virgilio H. Ortega	4,118		
San Miguel II	DBB-A-3	Marvin M. Benis	2,272		
San Nicolas I	DBB-D	Rolando A. Villalobos	2,071		
San Nicolas II	DBB-D	Leonardo T. Cabillo	4,576		
San Roque	DBB-C	Miguel V. Pamatian	2,855		
San Simon	DBB-C	Rodolfo Q. Berlon	6,242		
Santa Cristina I	DBB-C	Prudencio E. Bacomo Jr.	3,307		
Santa Cristina II	DBB-C	Marlon C. Grande	3,505		
Santa Cruz I	DBB-E	Kirby A. Andrada	5,112		
Santa Cruz II	DBB-E	Cita A. Baron	2,138		
Santa Fe	DBB-I	Emanuel B. Noora	6,314		
Santa Lucia	DBB-A-2	Francisco S. Cornejo Jr.	5,534		
Santa Maria	DBB-J	Arden Keith M. Castillo	5,068		
Santo Cristo	DBB-A-1	Lolita V. Federio	4,551		
Santo Niño I	DBB-A-1	Alvin C. Gimpes	2,859		
Santo Niño II	DBB-A-1	Rolando V. Salem Jr.	2,737		
Victoria Reyes	DBB-C	Leonila C. Bucao	13,838		
Zone I-B	Poblacion	Marlo O. Dupal-Ag	4,219		
Zone I	Poblacion	Edgardo G. De Guzman	5,595		
Zone II	Poblacion	Augusto L. Frani Sr.	1,677		
Zone III	Poblacion	Adrian P. Salasbar	3,821		
Zone IV	Poblacion	Alexander P. Geneveo	3,770		
Total population (2020)			703,141		

=== Congressional representation ===
The legislative district of Dasmariñas is the representation of the city in the House of Representatives of the Philippines. The district corresponds to the 4th legislative district of Cavite, which was created on October 22, 2009 just right before the ratification of the Charter of the City of Dasmariñas on November 25, 2009. Prior to being entitled its own representation, the municipality of Dasmariñas was represented in Congress as part of the lone district of Cavite from 1907 to 1972, and as part of Region IV-A in the Interim Batasang Pambansa from 1978 to 1984. From 1984 to 1986, it was represented at the Batasang Pambansa as part of the at-large district of Cavite, and was part of the second district of Cavite in the restored House of Representatives from 1987 to 2010.

The congressman of the legislative district of Dasmariñas is the representative of the city in the lower house of the Philippine Congress. It is elected to serve a three-year term, with a maximum of three terms. It is currently vacant following the expulsion of Kiko Barzaga on June 2, 2026.

=== Provincial Board Representation ===
Despite having its own representation in the congress, it is still an ordinary component city, meaning its citizens still elect provincial officials. The city has two representatives to the Sangguniang Panlalawigan ng Cavite (English: Provincial Board of Cavite). The board members are elected to serve a three-year term, with a maximum of three terms.

Position	Name
Representatives to the Sangguniang Panlalawigan ng Cavite 2022–2024	Nickol Austria
Representatives to the Sangguniang Panlalawigan ng Cavite 2022–2024	Fulgencio Dela Cuesta Jr.

=== City Seal ===
The seal was the winner of the City Logo making competition sponsored by the City Government. The competition started from February 26, 2010, until March 26 of the same year. Ryan Suarez, an alumnus of University of Santo Tomas College of Fine Arts and Design created the city seal. The winning seal underwent minor revisions and for the celebration of the 1st Cityhood Anniversary and the 143rd Feast of the Immaculate Conception, from November 25 – December 8, the new city logo was unveiled on November 26, 2010, in the City Quadrangle.

- The buildings, houses and the gear originate from the old seal which now represents the growing community and work force. The church symbolizes the historic Immaculate Conception Church in the Poblacion since it was the site of Battle of Perez-Dasmariñas during the Philippine Revolution against Spain. The sun is from the Philippine flag where each rays represents the provinces including Cavite with significant involvement in the 1896 Revolution. The people represents the family and the people of Dasmariñas.
- The two rice stalks and the farmer represents agriculture that reminds us that the city was once a farming community before evolving into an urbanized city. The globe symbolizes the city's global competitiveness while the green leaf represents the city's environmental advocacy.

=== Housing and Services ===
The Province of Cavite delivers affordable housing with basic services, facilities, livelihood opportunities through responsive housing, and resettlement programs.

== Culture ==
=== Tourism ===
The presence of Aguinaldo Highway and Governor's Drive makes the city a driving stop for tourists travelling to Tagaytay and Batangas from Metro Manila and to Laguna from the towns on the western part of Cavite. The city has a large number of hotels and resorts catering to tourists.

Every Christmas season (known as ber months), the center islands located within the National and Secondary Highways of the city, especially in Governor Dominador Mangubat Avenue (formerly known as congressional road) are decorated with numerous Christmas theme ornaments such as parols (mostly are theme in a butterfly designs).

The Museo De La Salle, located within the campus of the De La Salle University-Dasmariñas, is a unique, cultural, cross-disciplinary institution serving as a permanent museum of the De La Salle University System. As a resource center for both indoor and outdoor collections, it dedicates itself to the gathering of collectible objects of intrinsic value significant to the preservation of certain aspects of the Philippine ilustrado lifestyle. It envisions itself to be a leading contributor to the Philippine University museums' movement. It seeks to form productive partnerships that serve communities in creative ways. It vows to assist the member schools of the System in the core areas of teaching, research, community outreach, and administration. Through active collaboration with other museums in the nation, it promotes the interests of museology and upholds appreciation of the arts and culture.

The Daño Street offers a great view of the city's fields and formerly was the site of the tiangge or a bazaar during the Christmas season.

The Promenade Des Dasmariñas is an urban garden park located along the tributaries of Imus River. and is part of the river rehabilitation and beautification project of the city. It was inaugurated on March 25, 2019.

=== Events ===
Dasmariñas has numerous festivals and events held throughout the year, from barangay religious feasts to a citywide festival.

- Gawad Karangalan – last project held on September 23, 2022 (date varies)
- Dasmariñas Day – Celebrate every October 5
- Paruparo Festival – Celebrate every November 26
- Immaculate Conception Feast Day - Celebrate every December 8
- Binibining Dasmariñas - Held Every December 8

== Sports ==
The construction of the City of Dasmariñas Arena is almost finished that can accommodate 5000 seating capacity in Barangay Burol Main, Dasmariñas City Province of Cavite as seen on Friday (March 26, 2021). The City of Dasmariñas Arena recently hosts national events like games of the AsiaBasket last November 3–12, 2024 & Philippine Basketball Association (PBA) semi finals last May 22, 2024, soon it can also host prestigious beauty pageants like Binibining Pilipinas, and events that require a big seating capacity like concert events.

The city also has an outdoor arena called The New City of Dasmariñas Football Field and Track Oval with Grandstand that can host a big event like "Palarong Pambansa". And a Boxing Gym.

There are 106 covered courts in 75 barangays and 10 in public schools in the city.

There are also free sports clinics in the city, such as chess, baseball, and taekwondo.

The first Inter–Barangay Sports Tournament was held in 1999 where only two events were played Basketball and Volleyball. Since then it became a regular feature in the annual program of the local government of Dasmariñas.

The City Employees' Sportsfest caters to the employees of the City Government of Dasmariñas. It started in 2005 and since then, it has become a very much awaited event. Department Heads and rank and file employees compete in a friendly competition where talent, skills and perseverance are displayed in a manner comparable to a high level tournament.

Dasmariñas Private Schools Athletic Association commonly known as DPSAA started as an experimental project in 2001 to select athletes who will represent Private Schools in the Municipal Meet (now City Meet). After ten years in existence, DPSAA has become a breeding ground for athletes who hail from private schools.

== Education ==
De La Salle Medical and Health Sciences Institute

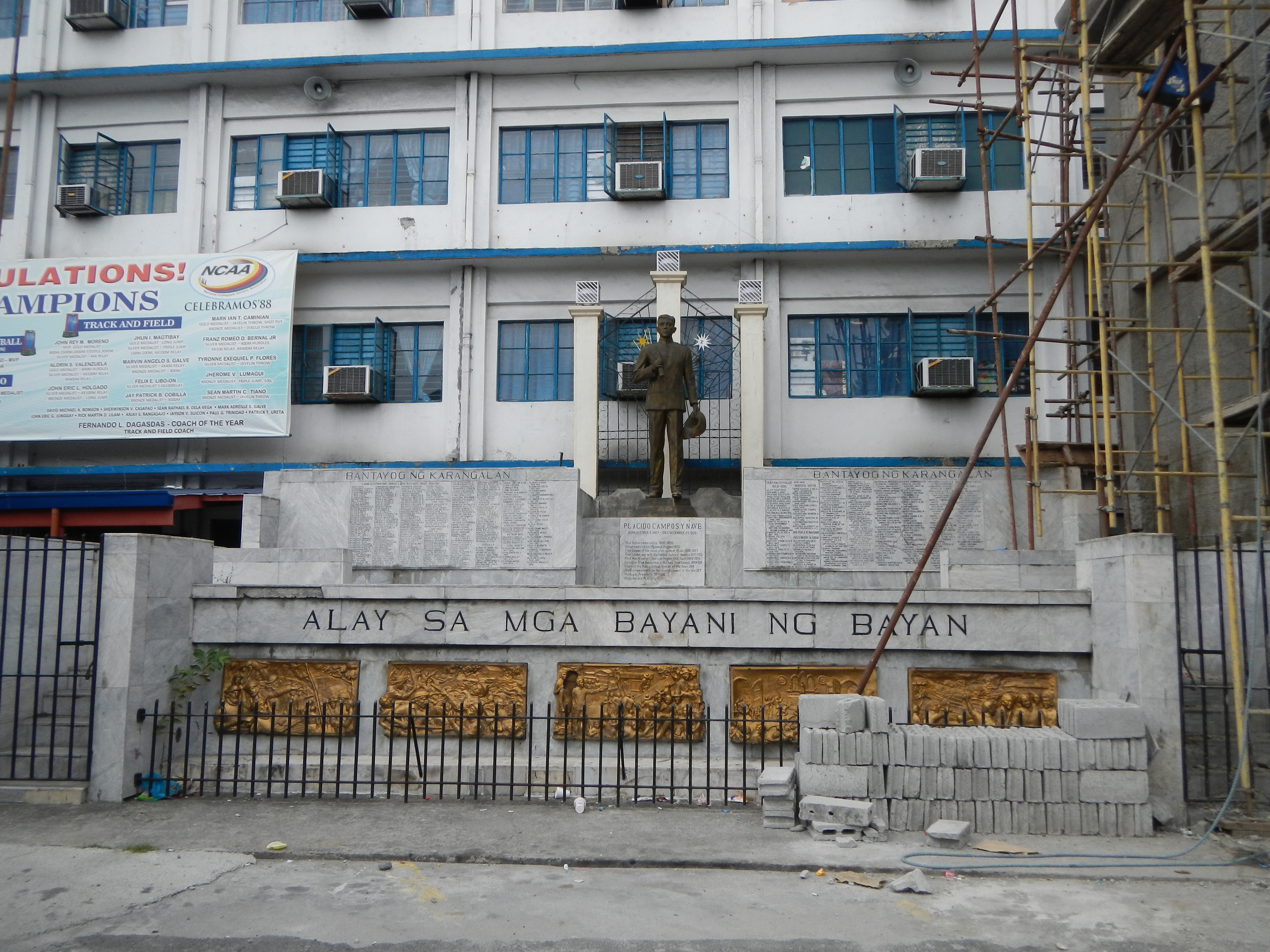
Immaculate Conception Academy

Five universities are located in the city, the highest among the cities and municipalities in Cavite. This earned Dasmariñas the nickname The University City of Cavite. The number of higher education institutions in the city allows it to serve the tertiary education needs of its population as well as those of the neighboring towns and provinces.

The largest of these is the De La Salle University-Dasmariñas which offers degrees in the liberal arts, business, science, engineering and criminology. Meanwhile, the similarly named but administratively independent college De La Salle Medical and Health Sciences Institute offers degrees in health sciences and operates the DLSU Medical Center, a tertiary-level hospital and the first ISO-Certified Hospital in the Philippines.

Other universities are Philippine Christian University Dasmariñas, TUP Cavite, National University Dasmariñas, and a campus of the Cavite State University Learning Center.

Several colleges also operate in the city. Some of these are the Emilio Aguinaldo College Cavite Campus, St. Paul College Island Park, St. Jude College Dasmariñas, National College of Science and Technology, Asian Institute of Science and Technology, STI College, and many others.

Some institutions offer degrees in maritime studies namely Magsaysay Maritime Academy, PNTC College and Southern Luzon College of Business Maritime and Science and technology Inc.

A public college funded by the local government, named Kolehiyo ng Lungsod ng Dasmariñas, was established in 2021 at Burol Main. The college began to hold classes in 2021, offering undergraduate degrees in nursing, civil engineering, midwifery, psychology, life sciences, and information systems.

=== UP Technology Innovation campus ===
In June 2024, a memorandum of understanding was signed by the University of the Philippines and Vista Land and Lifescapes, Incorporated for the establishment of the 5 hectares UP Technology Innovation campus at Vista City's University Town in Dasmariñas. Through a deed of donation, Vista Land will, at its own expense, develop and construct the campus' buildings and facilities. The campus' six-story building has 22,932 square meters floor area. UP president Angelo Jimenez led the groundbreaking in September.

== Media ==
The city also has its own newspaper, Usaping Bayan, the official newspaper of Dasmariñas.

Radio and television channels from Metro Manila are received clearly in the city. DASCA Cable Services provides cable television services to the city. Dasmariñas TV Channel 3, (Digital cable) where upcoming events, projects, announcements, finished projects, etc. are reached out to the Dasmariñas residents, is the city's official television station and is available thru subscription to DASCA Cable Services.

The only radio station in the city is Green FM on 95.9, operated by the De La Salle University-Dasmariñas.

== Transportation ==
=== Road Network ===
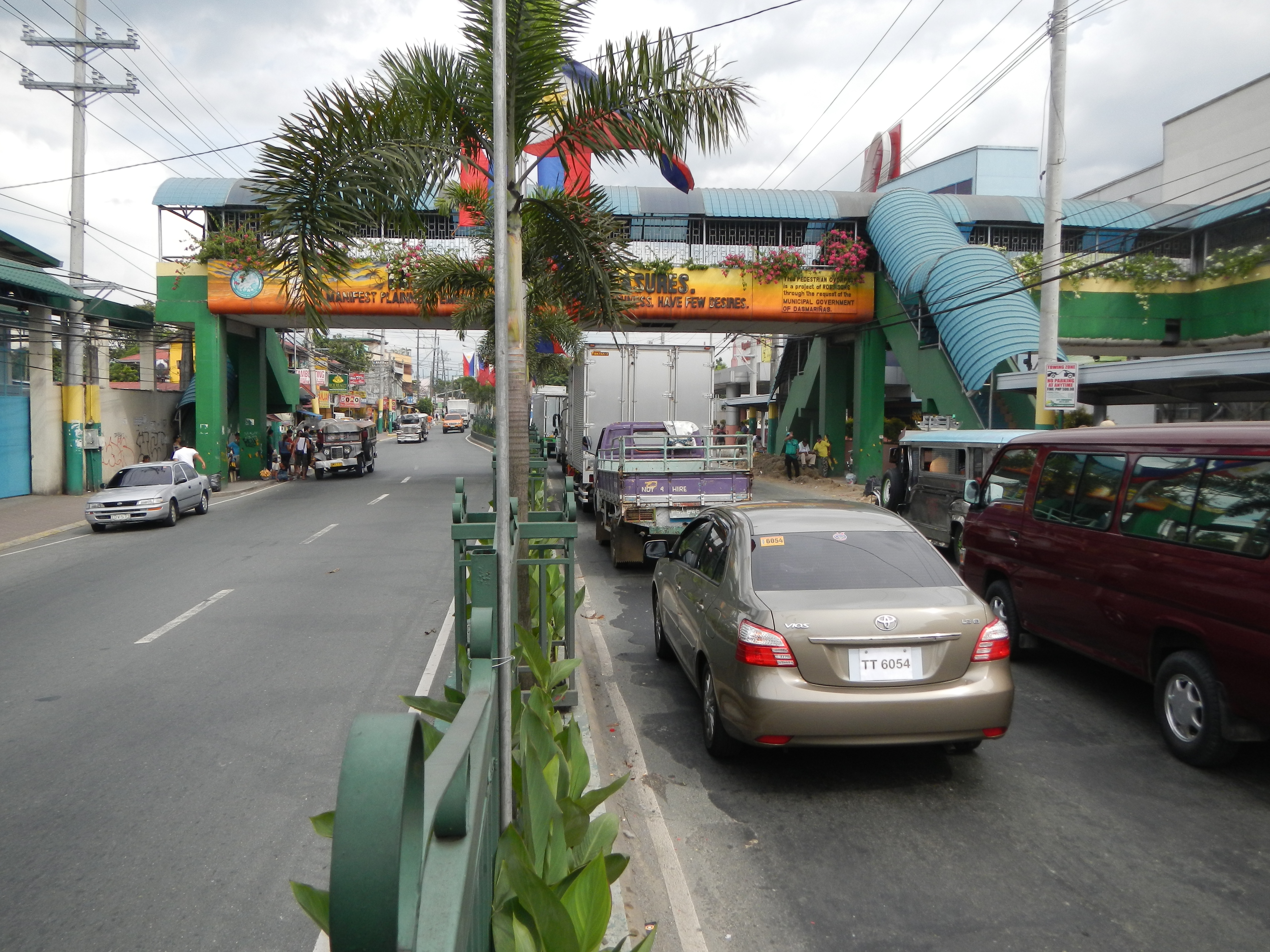
Aguinaldo Highway

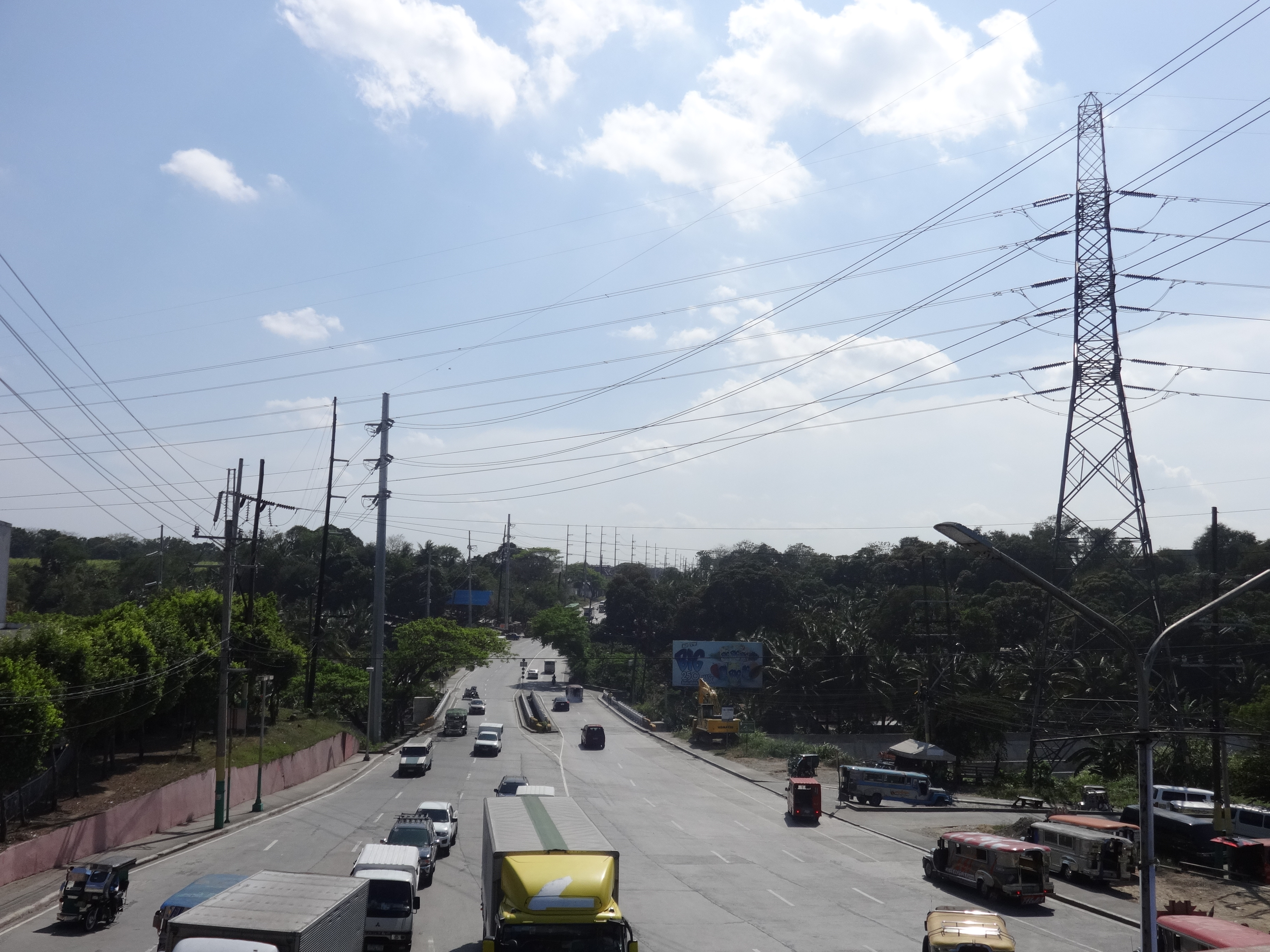
Governor's Drive west of Aguinaldo Highway intersection.

Several national roads connect Dasmariñas to other cities and towns. Aguinaldo Highway (N419) and Governor's Drive (N65) are the major north–south and east–west highways, respectively. The Aguinaldo Highway links the city to Metro Manila in the north, and Nasugbu in western Batangas. Meanwhile, Governor's Drive connects Laguna in the east to the capital Trece Martires and westward to coastal Cavite towns, such as Maragondon and Naic. These major highways are noted for congestion due to a lack of alternative routes and limited public transit.

Meanwhile, major city roads such as Paliparan Road and Salitran Road serve the suburbanized areas in the east and north. The city also maintains other thoroughfares, like Carlos Trinidad Avenue, Don Placido Campos Avenue, Congressional Avenue and several others that serves the other barangays.

In the late 2010s, new roads in the city were built. These include UTS Boulevard, diverting traffic away from the Pala-pala intersection; and Congressional Avenue Extension in Dasmariñas Bagong Bayan area connecting it to the Governor's Drive in Paliparan 1. Still under construction are Dasmarinas-General Trias Bypass Road and the Dasmariñas-GMA-Carmona Road.

The Cavite-Laguna Expressway is also under construction. While it will not have exits in the city, the Silang and Governor's Drive exits of the expressway will have catchment areas including the southern and western portions of the city, respectively.

=== Public Transport ===
Jeepneys can be found around the city, like other cities and town in the Philippines. Jeepney terminals are located in SM City Dasmariñas and Robinsons Place Dasmariñas, both in the Central Business District. It has fixed routes, and ply major roads of the city.

In the smaller streets, tricycles are more common. Tricycle terminals are scattered throughout the city, such as intersections of small streets and at the entrances of gated residential villages.

The city is also served by buses. These can take passengers from the city to Metro Manila, Batangas, Laguna, and other surrounding provinces, cities and towns. Other public transit options include UV Express, multicabs and a limited fleet of privately operated taxi cabs.

The nearest operating railway station is the Alabang PNR Station. It is about 23 kilometers minutes away via Daang Hari Boulevard.

==== Future projects ====
A future railway line called LRT Line 6 has been in the planning stages since 2015. It is envisioned to have 6 stops, three of which are to be located in the city: Salitran, Congressional Road and Governor's Drive. The line is planned to connect to the under-construction Niog station.

== Healthcare ==
LICENSED GOVERNMENT and PRIVATE HOSPITALS
Facility	Ownership Major Classification	Location
Dasmariñas City Medical Center, Inc.	Private	Salawag
Pagamutan ng Dasmariñas	Government	Burol 2 Bagong Bayan
Asia Medic Family Hospital And Medical Center	Private	Pala-Pala Sampaloc 1
Emilio Aguinaldo College Medical Center	Private	Salitran 2
De La Salle University Medical Center	Private	Zone 4 Poblacion
St. Paul Hospital Cavite, Inc.	Private	Burol 2 Bagong Bayan
GMF Hospital	Private	Zone 4 Poblacion
Medcor Dasmariñas Hospital and Medical Center	Private	Malinta Sampaloc 2

There are 8 major hospitals in Dasmariñas. The De la Salle University Medical Center is a 300-bed tertiary-level hospital affiliated with the De La Salle Medical and Health Sciences Institute. Established in 1980, it is the largest hospital in Cavite Province. On the other hand, the public-funded Pagamutan ng Dasmariñas (English: Dasmariñas Hospital) opened in 2016, aimed to serve indigent patients of the city. Another on-going construction is the Dasmariñas Doctors Hospital located in San Agustin 2.

The MV Santiago Medical Center is located inside the First Cavite Industrial Estate (FCIE). The FCIE is a 159.5 - hectare industrial subdivision built to service all basic needs of any manufacturing concern of the light-to-medium scale industry.

The city government also offers health services via its four city ( And the fifth C.H.O is under construction) health offices located around its jurisdiction and established a barangay health centers in all of its 75 barangays. Animal bite centers, drug testing centers, a social hygiene clinic, medical & maternity clinic and a new dialysis center are also available.

== Notable personalities ==
- Wilfredo Alicdan (b. 1965), figurative artist and painter
- Jennifer Barzaga (b. 1975), current city mayor, former member of the Philippine House of Representatives
- Kiko Barzaga (b. 1998), Filipino politician, activist and animal welfare advocate
- Elpidio Barzaga Jr. (1950–2024), former member of the Philippine House of Representatives, former city mayor, (deceased)
- Jose C. Campos (1923–2005), Associate Justice of the Supreme Court of the Philippines from 1992 to 1993
- Paulo Campos (1921–2007), physician, educator, National Scientist of the Philippines
- Seth Fedelin (b. 2002), actor, model, singer, dancer
- Malupiton (b. 1998), social media personality and entertainer
- Dominador I. Mangubat (1903–1980), physician, former Governor of Cavite
- Nardong Putik (1925–1971), Leonardo M. Manicio a Caviteno folk hero wielding an amulet
- Arny Ross (b. 1991), actress, comedian, model, dancer
- Bella Santiago (b. 1989), singer
- Miguel Tanfelix (b. 1998), actor, dancer, host
- Migs Bustos (b. 1988), television newscaster, radio host
- Neil Coleta (b. 1991), actor, model
