= List of normal schools in the Philippines =

This is a list of normal schools in the Philippines. The term “normal school” is based on the French école normale, a sixteenth-century model school with model classrooms where model teaching practices were taught to teacher candidates.

== History ==
The oldest normal school for girls in the Far East is the Universidad de Santa Isabel, located at Naga City. It is a sectarian school run by the Daughters of Charity. The first secular normal school was founded in 1901 by the Thomasites, the Philippine Normal School. It was converted into a college in 1949 and was elevated to its present university status in 1992 as the Philippine Normal University. In 2009, it was designated as the country's National Center for Teacher Education by virtue of Republic Act 9647. In Iloilo City, the West Visayas State University was originally established as a normal school in 1902.

=== Teacher Education Council ===
The Teacher Education Council (TEC), in accordance with Republic Act No. 7784 as amended by Republic Act No. 11713, establishes Centers of Excellence for Teacher Education. The designation of Center of Excellence (COE) and Center of Development (COD) follows CHEd Memorandum Order 26, s. 2007 and 16, s. 2015. Teacher Education Institutiton (TEI) that are designated as a COD may eventually be classified as a COE.

In October 2025, the TEC launched the 2035 Teacher Education Road Map

=== Second Congressional Commission on Education ===
A study in 2026 by the Second Congressional Commission on Education shows that there are 1,553 Teacher Education Institutions out of 2,404 Higher Education Institutions in the country.

== List of normals schools ==
The list of normal schools in the Philippines is as follows:

School	Location	Classification	Remarks	Reference
Adamson University	Manila, NCR	private	Center of Development	
Adventist University of the Philippines	Silang, Cavite, Region IVA	private	Center of Excellence	
Angeles University Foundation	Angeles City, Pampanga, Region III	private	Center of Excellence	
Ateneo de Davao University	Davao City, Davao del Sur, Region XI	private	Center of Development	
Ateneo de Naga University	Naga City , Camarines Sur, Region V	private	Center of Excellence	
Ateneo de Zamboanga University	Zamboanga City, Region IX	private	Center of Excellence	
Batangas State University-Pablo Borbon-Main Campus	Batangas, Region IVA	SUC	Center of Development	
Benguet State University	La Trinidad, Benguet, CAR	SUC	Center of Excellence	
Bicol University College of Education	Albay, Region V	SUC	Center of Excellence	
Bukidnon State University	Malaybalay, Bukidnon, Region X	SUC	Center of Development	
Capitol University	Cagayan de Oro, Region X	private	Center of Development	
Catanduanes State University	Region V	SUC	Center of Development	
Cebu Normal University	Region VII		Center of Excellence	
Central Bicol State University of Agriculture	Region V	SUC	Center of Development	
Central Luzon State University	Muñoz, Nueva Ecija, Region III	SUC	Center of Excellence	
Central Mindanao University	Region X		Center of Development	
Central Philippine University	Region VI		Center of Development	
Centro Escolar University	Manila, NCR	private	Center of Excellence	
City College of San Fernando Pampanga	San Fernando, Pampanga, Region III			
De La Salle University – Dasmariñas	Dasmariñas, Cavite, Region IVA	private	Center of Excellence	
De La Salle University-Manila-Br. Andrew Gonzalez College of Education	Manila, NCR	private	Center of Excellence	
Don Honorio Ventura State University – Main	Region III	SUC	Center of Development	
Don Mariano Marcos Memorial State University-North La Union-Main Campus	Region I	SUC	Center of Development	
Don Mariano Marcos Memorial State University-South La Union Campus	Region I	SUC	Center of Development	
Far Eastern University	Manila, NCR	private	Center of Excellence	
Father Saturnino Urios University	Region XIII		Center of Development	
Holy Angel University	Region III		Center of Development	
Holy Name University	Region VII		Center of Development	
Iloilo Science and Technology University-Main	Iloilo City, Iloilo, Region VI	SUC	Center of Development	
Isabela State University Cabagan Campus	Region II	SUC	Center of Development	
Laguna State Polytechnic University-San Pablo City	San Pablo, Laguna, Region IVA	SUC	Center of Development	
Leyte Normal University	Tacloban, Leyte, Region VIII	SUC	Center of Development	
Lyceum of the Philippines University – Cavite	General Trias, Cavite, Region VA	private		
Mariano Marcos State University	Batac, Ilocos Norte, Region I	SUC	Center of Excellence	
Mindanao State University–Iligan Institute of Technology	Iligan, Lanao del Norte, Region X	SUC	Center of Excellence	
Miriam College	Quezon City, NCR	private	Center of Excellence	
Misamis University	Ozamiz, Misamis Occidental, Region X	private	Center of Development	
Negros Oriental State University-Main Campus	Dumaguete, Negros Oriental, Region VII	SUC	Center of Development	
Notre Dame of Marbel University	Koronadal, South Cotabato, Region XII	private	Center of Development	
Our Lady of Fatima University		private		
Palawan State University	Puerto Princesa, Palawan, Region IVB	SUC	Center of Excellence	
Pangasinan State University-Bayambang	Lingayen, Pangasinan, Region I	SUC	Center of Excellence	
Philippine Normal University-Manila	Manila, NCR	SUC	Center of Excellence	
Philippine Normal University-North Luzon Campus	Region II	SUC	Center of Excellence	
Philippine Normal University-Mindanao	Region XIII	SUC	Center of Excellence	
St. Louis University	Baguio, Benguet, CAR	Private	Center of Excellence	
Saint Louis College	Region I		Center of Excellence	
Silliman University	Dumaguete, Negros Oriental, Region VII	private	Center of Excellence	
San Pedro College	Davao City, Davao del Sur, Region XI	private		
Siquijor State College	Larena, Siquijor, Region VII	SUC	Center of Development	
Southern Leyte State University-Tomas Oppus Campus	Tomas Oppus, Southern Leyte, Region VIII	SUC	Center of Development	
St. Mary’s University	Bayombong, Nueva Vizcaya, Region II	private	Center of Excellence	
St. Bridget College	Batangas City, Batangas, Region IVA	private		
St. Paul University Philippines	Region II		Center of Excellence	
Southern Luzon State University	Region IVA	SUC	Center of Development	
Tarlac Agricultural University	Camiling, Tarlac Region III	SUC	Center of Excellence	
Tarlac State University-Lucinda Campus	Tarlac City, Tarlac, Region III	SUC	Center of Development	
Technological Institute of the Philippines - Quezon City - College of Education	Quezon City, NCR	private		
Tomas Claudio Colleges	Morong, Rizal, Region IVA	private		
Trinity University of Asia College of Arts, Sciences, and Education	Quezon City, NCR	private		
Universidad de Santa Isabel	Region		Center of Development V	
University of Asia and the Pacific	NCR	private	Center of Development	
University of Baguio	CAR		Center of Development	
University of Batangas	Region IVA		Center of Excellence	
University of Cordilleras	Baguio, CAR		Center of Excellence	
University of Luzon	Region I		Center of Development	
University of Makati	Taguig, NCR	LUC		
University of Mindanao-Bolton	Region XI		Center of Excellence	
University of Mindanao-Tagum	Region XI		Center of Development	
University of Northern Philippines (Main)	Region I		Center of Development	
University of Perpetual Help System-Biñan	Biñan, Laguna, Region IVA	private	Center of Development	
University of San Agustin	Region VI		Center of Development	
University of San Carlos	Region VII		Center of Excellence	
University of San Jose-Recoletos	Region VII		Center of Excellence	
University of Santo Tomas	Manila, NCR	private	Center of Excellence	
University of Southeastern Philippines	Tagum, Davao del Norte, Region XI	SUC	Center of Excellence	
University of St. La Salle	Bacolod, Negros Occidental, Region VI	private	Center of Development	
University of the Immaculate Conception	Davao City, Davao del Sur, Region XI	private	Center of Development	
University of the Philippines Diliman	Quezon City, NCR	SUC	Center of Excellence	
West Visayas State University-Main	Iloilo City, Iloilo, Region VI	SUC	Center of Excellence	
Western Mindanao State University	Zamboanga City, Region IX	SUC	Center of Development	
Xavier University	Cagayan de Oro, Misamis Oriental, Region X	private	Center of Excellence	
Zamboanga City State Polytechnic College	Zamboanga City, Region IX	SUC	Center of Development	

== See also ==
- Normal school
- List of normal schools by country
