= Morongo (disambiguation) =

The Morongo Band of Mission Indians is a federally recognized tribe in California, United States.

Morongo may also refer to:

== People ==
- Maarrênga’yam Serrano people, or people from Morongo

== Places ==
=== California ===
- Morongo Basin, in San Bernardino County
  - Morongo Casino, Resort & Spa
- Morongo Valley, California in San Bernardino County

=== Other places ===
- Morongo estate, an historic homestead in Bell Post Hill, Geelong, Australia
- Morongo Girls' College in Geelong, Australia that closed in 1994
- Morongo Uta, an archeological site on Rapa Iti, French Polynesia

== Other uses ==
- Morongo Unified School District
- Morongo Valles, a valley on the planet Venus

== See also ==
- Cabazon, California, an unincorporated community associated with the Morongo Indian Reservation
- Mofongo, a Puerto Rican dish with fried plantains
- Mohongo or Sacred Sun (1809–1836), a Native American woman of the Osage Nation
- Morengo, a municipality in Bergamo, Lombardy, Italy
- Morong (disambiguation)
