= Ateneo de Manila University – General Trias =

University in Cavite, Philippines

- ADMU Gen Tri
- Type: Private university
- Established: 2025 (partnership agreement); Expected 2030
- Parent institution: Ateneo de Manila University
- Location: Riverpark Township, General Trias, Cavite, Philippines
- Campus: Urban, 15 hectares

The Ateneo de Manila University – General Trias (ADMU Gen Tri) is a planned campus of the Ateneo de Manila University, located at Riverpark Township, General Trias, Cavite, Philippines.

== History ==
The establishment of ADMU Gentri was formalized through a partnership between the GT Capital Holdings Inc. and Ateneo de Manila University in 2025. Which the campus is expected to open by 2030 at a 15 hectare parcel of land.
