= Cavite's 6th congressional district =

Legislative district of the Philippines

- Constituency for the House of Representatives of the Philippines
- Boundary of Cavite's 6th congressional district in Cavite
- Location of Cavite within the Philippines

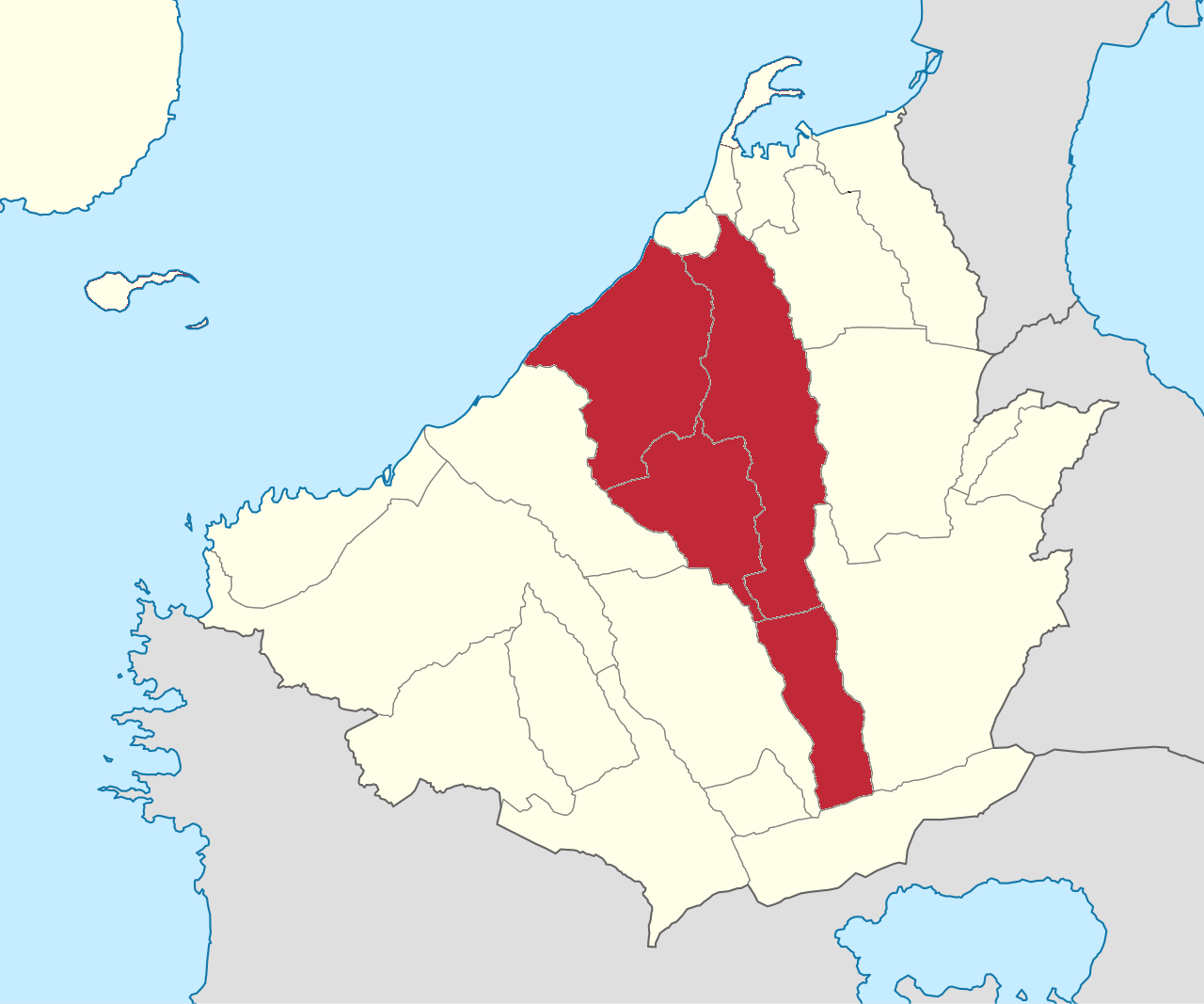
- District boundaries, 2010-2019
- Province: Cavite
- Region: Calabarzon
- Population: 450,583 (2020)
- Electorate: 212,830 (2025)
- Major settlements: General Trias
- Area: 81.46 km^{2} (31.45 sq mi)

Current constituency
- Created: 2009
- Representative: Antonio Ferrer
- Political party: NUP
- Congressional bloc: Majority

Cavite's 6th congressional district is one of the eight congressional districts of the Philippines in the province of Cavite. It has been represented in the House of Representatives of the Philippines since 2010. It consists of only the city of General Trias. It is currently represented in the 20th Congress by Antonio Ferrer of the National Unity Party (NUP).

Prior to its reconfiguration in 2019, the district also included the municipalities of Amadeo and Tanza as well as the city of Trece Martires, the de facto provincial capital. The separation of General Trias prompted the realignment of Cavite's congressional districts, with its former component areas forming part of the new 7th district.

== Representation history ==
#	Image	Member	Term of office		Congress	Party	Electoral history	Constituent LGUs
#	Image	Member	Start	End	Congress	Party	Electoral history	Constituent LGUs
=== Cavite's 6th district for the House of Representatives of the Philippines ===
District created July 27, 2009.
1		Antonio A. Ferrer	June 30, 2010	June 30, 2013	15th	Lakas (Magdalo)	Elected in 2010.	2010–2019; Amadeo, General Trias, Tanza, Trece Martires
1		Antonio A. Ferrer	June 30, 2010	June 30, 2013	15th	NUP (Magdalo)	Elected in 2010.	2010–2019; Amadeo, General Trias, Tanza, Trece Martires
2		Luis A. Ferrer IV	June 30, 2013	June 30, 2022	16th	NUP	Elected in 2013.	2010–2019; Amadeo, General Trias, Tanza, Trece Martires
2		Luis A. Ferrer IV	June 30, 2013	June 30, 2022	17th	NUP	Re-elected in 2016.	2010–2019; Amadeo, General Trias, Tanza, Trece Martires
2		Luis A. Ferrer IV	June 30, 2013	June 30, 2022	18th	NUP	Re-elected in 2019.	2019–present General Trias
(1)		Antonio A. Ferrer	June 30, 2022	Incumbent	19th	NUP	Elected in 2022.	2019–present General Trias
(1)		Antonio A. Ferrer	June 30, 2022	Incumbent	20th	NUP	Re-elected in 2025.	2019–present General Trias

== Election results ==
=== 2025 ===
2025 Philippine House of Representatives election in Cavite's 6th congressional district
Party	Candidate	Votes	%
NUP	Antonio Ferrer	121,284	100
Total votes		121,284	100
NUP hold			

=== 2022 ===
2022 Philippine House of Representatives elections
Party	Candidate	Votes	%
NUP	Antonio Ferrer	118,371	100%
Total votes		118,371	100%
NUP hold			

=== 2019 ===
2019 Philippine House of Representatives elections
Party	Candidate	Votes	%
NUP	Luis A. Ferrer IV	84,282	100%
Total votes		84,282	100%
NUP hold			

=== 2016 ===
2016 Philippine House of Representatives elections
Party	Candidate	Votes	%
NUP	Luis A. Ferrer IV	176,777	100%
Total votes		176,777	100%
NUP hold			

=== 2013 ===
2013 Philippine House of Representatives elections
Party	Candidate	Votes	%
NUP	Luis A. Ferrer IV	96,998	67.59%
Liberal	Dencito Campaña	46,506	37.41%
Total votes		143,504	100%
NUP hold			

=== 2010 ===
2010 Philippine House of Representatives elections
Party	Candidate	Votes	%
Lakas–Kampi	Antonio Ferrer	108,574	62.21%
Liberal	Hermogenes Arayata, Jr.	63,951	36.64%
Independent	Rosario Gonzales	2,500	1.15%
Invalid or blank votes		11,680	6.27
Total votes		186,205	100%
Lakas–Kampi win (new seat)			

== See also ==
- Legislative districts of Cavite
