= Antonio Ferrer =

Filipino politician

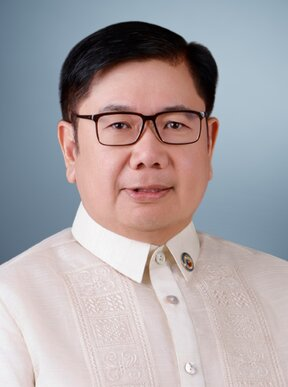
- Official portrait, 2025

Member of the Philippine House of Representatives from Cavite's 6th district
- Incumbent
- Assumed office June 30, 2022
- Preceded by: Luis A. Ferrer IV
- In office June 30, 2010 – June 30, 2013
- Preceded by: Office established
- Succeeded by: Luis A. Ferrer IV

Mayor of General Trias
- In office June 30, 2013 – June 30, 2022
- Preceded by: Luis A. Ferrer IV
- Succeeded by: Luis A. Ferrer IV

Personal details
- Born: November 10, 1966 (age 59) Ermita, Manila, Philippines
- Party: NUP (2011–present)
- Other political affiliations: Lakas (2009–2011); Magdalo (2009–2016)
- Spouse: Anna Lisa Alcantara-Ferrer
- Children: 3
- Education: De La Salle University (BA); University of the East (LL.B)

Antonio "Ony" Alandy Ferrer (born November 10, 1966) is a Filipino politician who has served as the representative for Cavite's sixth district since 2022. Before being elected to Congress, he served as the mayor of General Trias from 2013 to 2022. He is the brother of former representative and incumbent city mayor Luis Ferrer IV.

== Life and career ==
His father is Luis S. Ferrer III, a former provincial vice governor. His grandfather, Luis Y. Ferrer Jr., and great-grandfather, Luis O. Ferrer Sr. were former governors of Cavite.

He finished his tertiary education at De La Salle University in Manila, earning Bachelor of Arts major in Political Science majors. He also graduated with Laws at University of the East, also in Manila. In 1994, he passed the Philippine Bar Examinations and became an attorney. He became a legal researcher, legal assistant and legal officer of Duty-Free Philippines from 1993 to 1998. Then he became legal counsel, manager and economic zone manager.

=== Electoral history ===
After the enactment of RA 9727 establishing the legislative districts of Cavite, he ran for congressman in the 2010 elections under Lakas-Kampi-CMD and as an adopted candidate of the Nacionalista Party. He won as the first representative of Cavite's 6th district, garnering 108,574 votes against former Tanza mayor and Games and Amusement Board Chairman Hermogenes "Ashley" Arayata Jr., who garnered 63,951 votes.

Ferrer ran for a mayoralty position in the 2013 midterm elections, alongside his brother Luis who ran as a 6th District representative, under the National Unity Party ticket which caucused from old party, Lakas. Both of them won in their respective positions, with Antonio earning 46,575 votes against Liberal Party candidate and former vice-mayor Fernando "Totie" Campaña.

Ferrer is the first city mayor of General Trias, following a cityhood referendum held on December 12, 2015.

Ferrer ran for a second term as mayor in the 2016 general elections, earning 70,997 votes over Nationalist People's Coalition candidate Annalyn Jubilio, serving as his first full term as city mayor.

== Personal life ==
He is married to Anna Lisa Alcantara and has three children.

House of Representatives of the Philippines
New district	Representative, 6th District of Cavite; 2010–2013	Succeeded by Luis Ferrer IV
Preceded by Luis Ferrer IV	Representative, 6th District of Cavite; 2022–present	Incumbent
Political offices
Preceded by Luis Ferrer IV	Mayor of General Trias; 2013–2022	Succeeded by Luis Ferrer IV
