= Yasin Tehsil =

Tehsil in Gilgit-Baltistan, Pakistan

Yasin (in Urdu: یاسین/یسین) is a tehsil of Gupis-Yasin District in the Gilgit-Baltistan region of Pakistan.

It consists of several side-valleys, including Siliharang, Heltar, Damalgan, Barkhai, Gindai, Masher (مشر), Noh, Bujayot, Center Yasin, Thaus, Nazbar, Morke, Thui, Sulatanabad, Sandi, Qorkulti, Gholjalti, Barkulti, Hundur, Umalsat, and Darkut.

Parts of Yasin were affected by the August 2025 flash floods in northern Pakistan.

== Villages ==
Administratively, Yasin constitutes Yasin Sub Division, which is part of Ghizer District. It is further divided into four local councils: Yasin, Sultanabad, Silgan and Thoi.

- Yasin consists of the villages of Chiliharang, Damalgan, Gindai, Noh, Morka, Atkash, Bujayot, Manichi, Thodass, Thaus, and Nazbar Valley. Thodass is the headquarters of this union council.
- Sultanabad union council consists of the villages of Chumarkhan, Taus, Barkhachi, Sultanabad (Met, Huyelti), Ghojalti, Sandi, Dalsandi and Qorqolti Valley. Taus is the headquarters of this union council.
- Selgaan union council consists of the villages of Barandass, Barkolti, Gulbashoroot, Chilpi, Sheghetan, Hundur, Tersat, Umalsat and Darkut, which leads to the Pass to Boroghol. Hundur is the headquarters of this union council.
- Thoi Valley union council consists of the villages of Ghaingchel, Ishkaibar, Karimabad, Dalkoi, Dapis, Shamsabad(Druch), Harp, Rahimabad, Kuno, Shot, Chiryat, Ishqamdass, Draskin, Nalti, Dass, Thelti, Ishqamghoro, Mahrakabun and Mushibarnala, which leads to Yarkhun Pass. Harp is the headquarters of this union council.

== See also ==
- Yasin Valley
