= Luis Ferrer IV =

Philippine politician (born 1972)

Mayor of General Trias
- Incumbent
- Assumed office June 30, 2022
- Preceded by: Antonio Ferrer
- In office June 30, 2004 – June 30, 2013
- Preceded by: Dencito Campaña
- Succeeded by: Antonio Ferrer

Member of the Philippine House of Representatives from Cavite's 6th congressional district
- In office June 30, 2013 – June 30, 2022
- Preceded by: Antonio Ferrer
- Succeeded by: Antonio Ferrer

Member of Cavite Provincial Board from the 2nd district
- In office June 30, 2001 – June 30, 2004

Personal details
- Born: Luis Alandy Ferrer IV; December 12, 1972 (age 53)
- Party: NUP (2011–present)
- Other political affiliations: Lakas (2004–2011); Independent (2001–2004); Magdalo (2001–2016)

Luis Alandy Ferrer IV (born December 12, 1972) is a Filipino politician who is currently holding the position as the mayor of the City of General Trias since 2022. He previously held the office from 2004 to 2013. He served as the representative of Cavite's 6th congressional district from 2013 to 2022.

== Biography ==
Luis Alandy Ferrer IV was born to parents Luis Ferrer III and Teresing Ferrer. His older brother, Antonio A. Ferrer, is currently Cavite's 6th District representative, and also a former mayor of General Trias. His father is Luis S. Ferrer III, a former provincial Vice-Governor. His grandfather, Luis Y. Ferrer Jr., and great-grandfather, Luis O. Ferrer Sr. were former governors of Cavite.

The Grand Lodge of the Philippines lists Ferrer as a member; the Governor Luis Olimpo Ferrer, Sr. Memorial Lodge was named in honor of his great-grandfather.
