= St. Francis of Assisi Parish Church (General Trias) =

Roman Catholic church in Cavite, Philippines

General Trias Church
- Saint Francis of Assisi Parish Church
- San Francisco de Malabon Parish Church
- Parroquia de San Francisco de Malabon (Spanish)
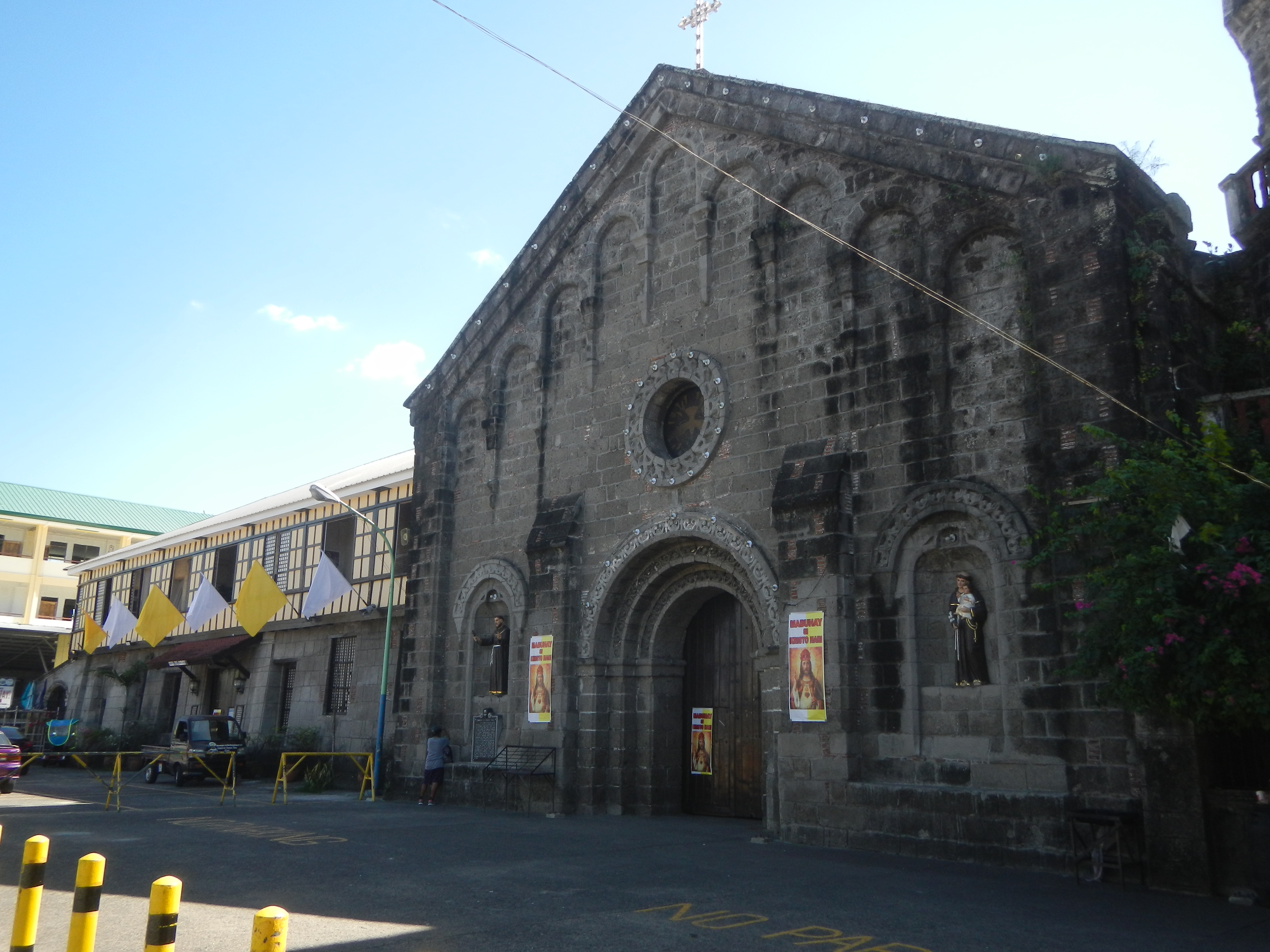
- Church façade in 2018

- Location in Luzon Location in the Philippines
- 14°23′08″N 120°52′48″E
- Location: General Trias, Cavite
- Country: Philippines
- Denomination: Roman Catholic
- Churchmanship: Latin Rite

History
- Status: Parish church
- Founder: Franciscans (1611)
- Consecrated: 1770s and 1991

Architecture
- Functional status: Active
- Heritage designation: Marked Historical Structure (1992)
- Architectural type: Church with attached convent
- Style: Barn-type, Baroque
- Groundbreaking: 1769

Specifications
- Length: 180 feet (55 m)
- Width: 80 feet (24 m)
- Materials: Stone

Administration
- Archdiocese: Archdiocese of Manila
- Diocese: Diocese of Imus

Clergy
- Priest: Rev. Fr. Ryan Serafin P. Sasis

Saint Francis of Assisi Parish Church, also known as San Francisco de Malabon Parish Church and commonly known as General Trias Church, is the first Roman Catholic parish church of the city of General Trias in Cavite province in the Philippines. It is under the jurisdiction of the Diocese of Imus. Typical of towns established during the Spanish colonial period, the church is located at the plaza (town square) of General Trias, which was formerly called San Francisco de Malabon in honor of its patron saint, Saint Francis of Assisi.

== History ==
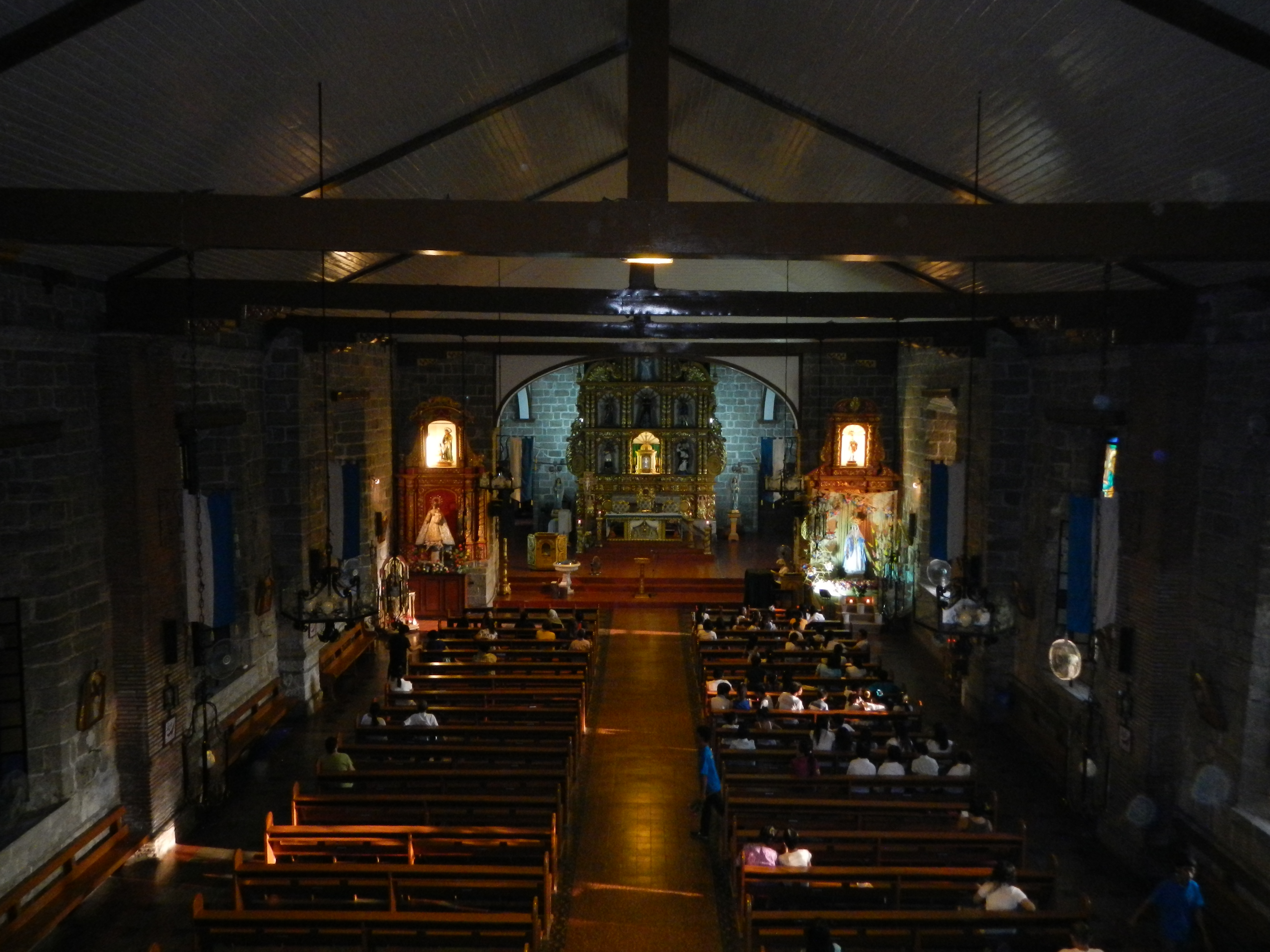
Church interior in 2013

The first church in General Trias was established by the Franciscans when it was still a visita (sub-parish) of Cavite Viejo (now Kawit). It was transferred to the Jesuit order of Cavite Puerto (now Cavite City) in 1624, eventually becoming a separate parish on September 9, 1753.

The first stone church was erected in 1769 under the leadership of Doña Maria Josepha de Yrizzari Y Ursula, Countess of Lizarraga. It was restored and enlarged in 1834. The Luzon earthquakes of 1880 partially damaged the church. As a result, the facade was replaced in 1881 with further restoration in 1885. The roof tiles were replaced in 1892 with the lighter, corrugated galvanised iron roofing as further protection from earthquakes. It was again refurbished and enlarged in 1893.

Between 1989 and 1991, the church was restored to its former appearance. After completion, it was again consecrated on June 22, 1991, by Felix P. Perez of the Diocese of Imus in which it lies.

== Convent building ==
Attached to the church is the convent. It is where the Banda San Francisco de Malabon, a local marching band, practiced the music of the Philippine national anthem Marcha Filipina before performing it during the Philippine Declaration of Independence from Spain on June 12, 1898, in Kawit, Cavite. The convent now houses the Museo de San Francisco de Malabon.

== Historical marker ==
The St. Francis of Assisi Church was declared a historic structure by the National Historical Institute of the Philippines (now National Historical Commission of the Philippines) with the placing of a marker in 1992.

== Gallery ==
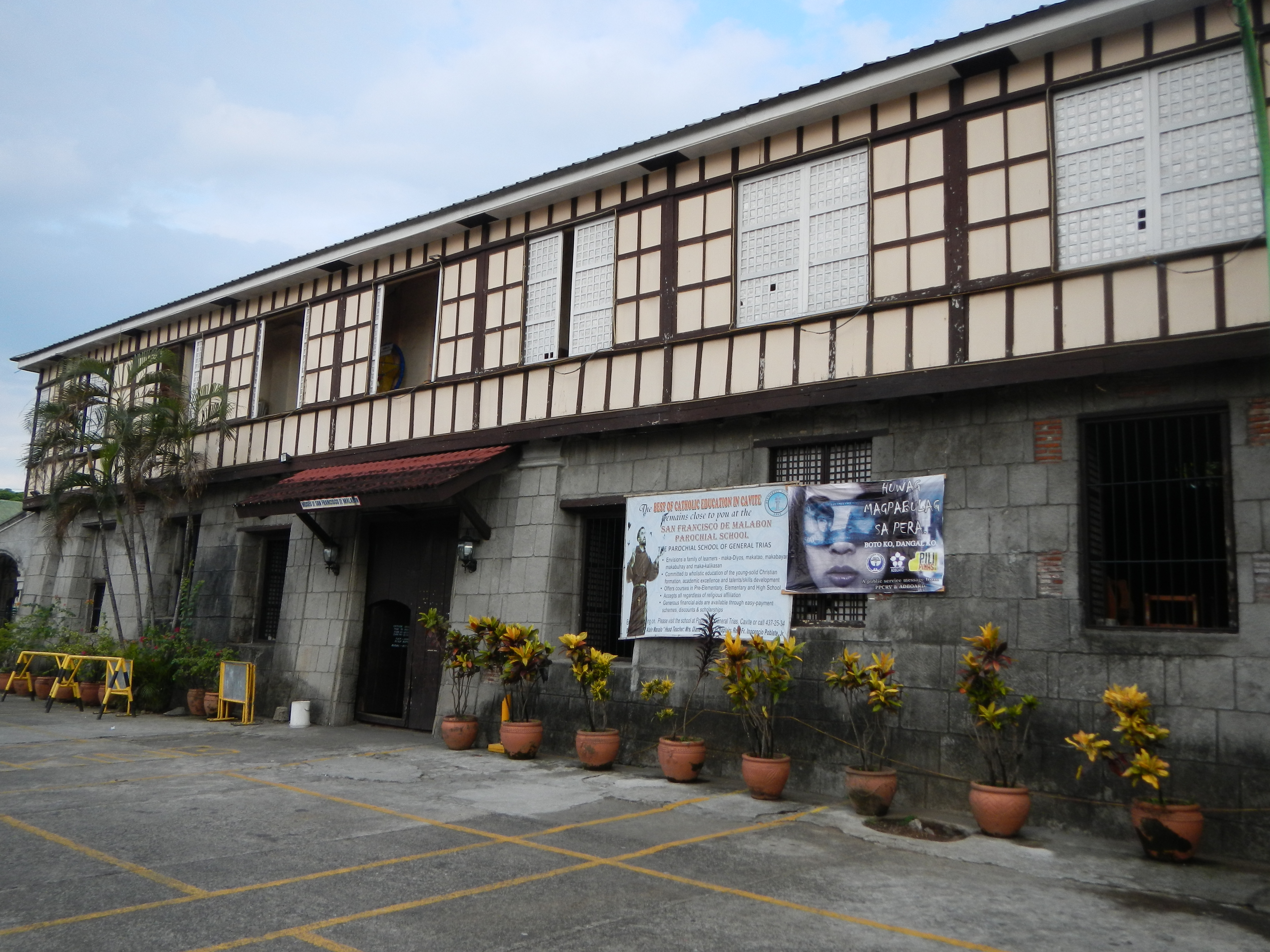
The church convent where the Banda San Francisco de Malabon rehearsed for the first performance of the National Anthem of the Philippines

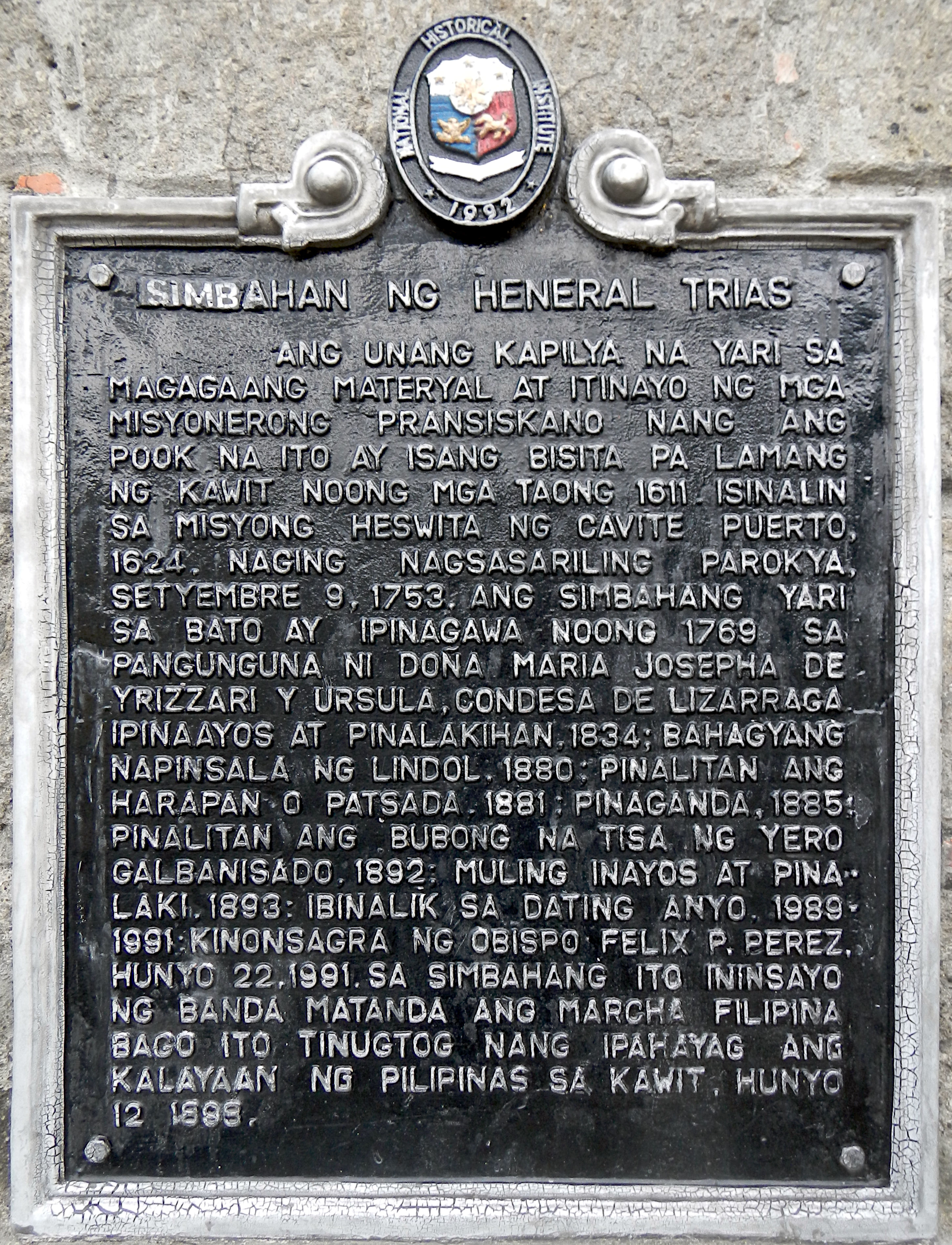
Church NHI historical marker installed in 1992
