= General Trias =

Component city in Cavite, Philippines

- Component city
- City of General Trias
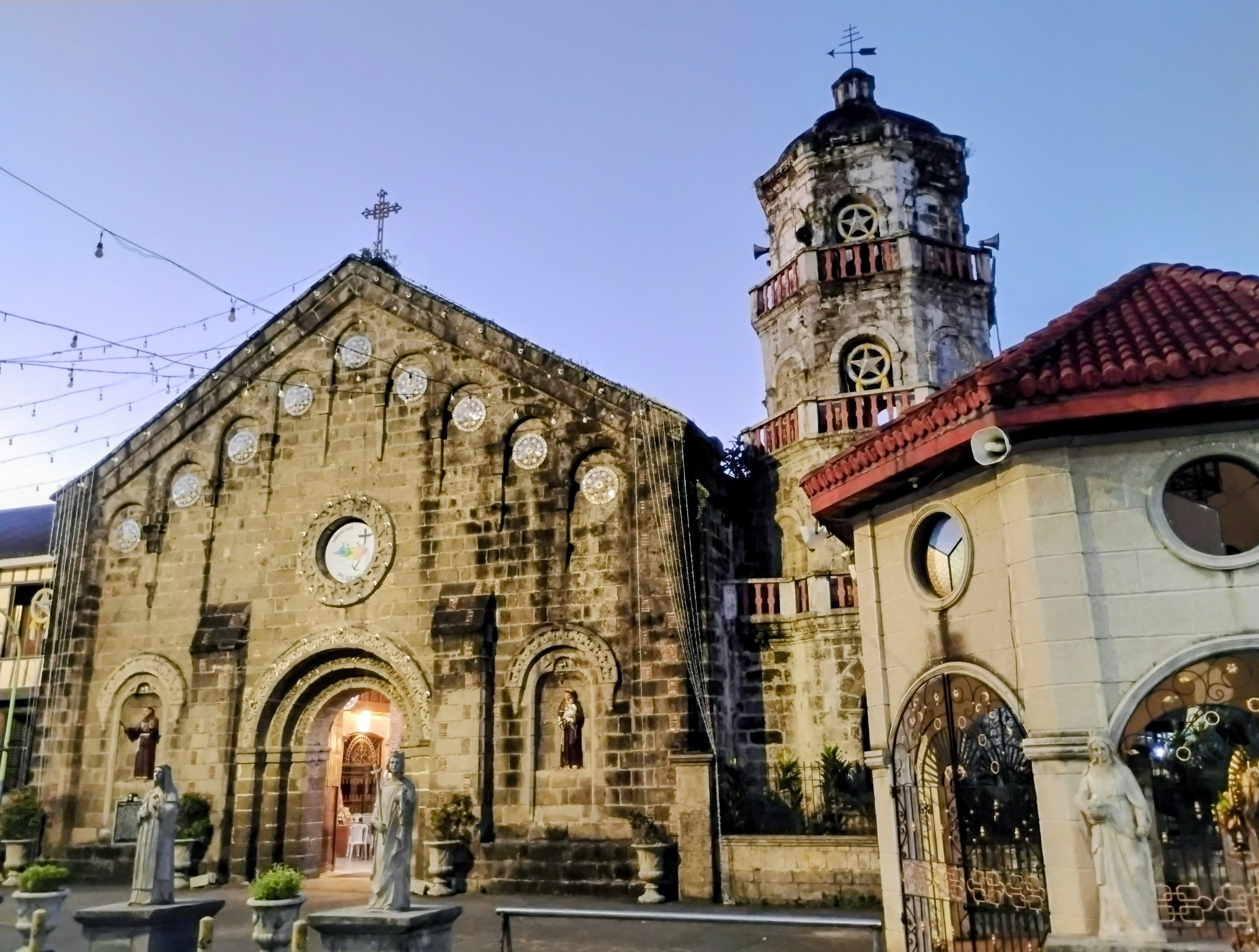
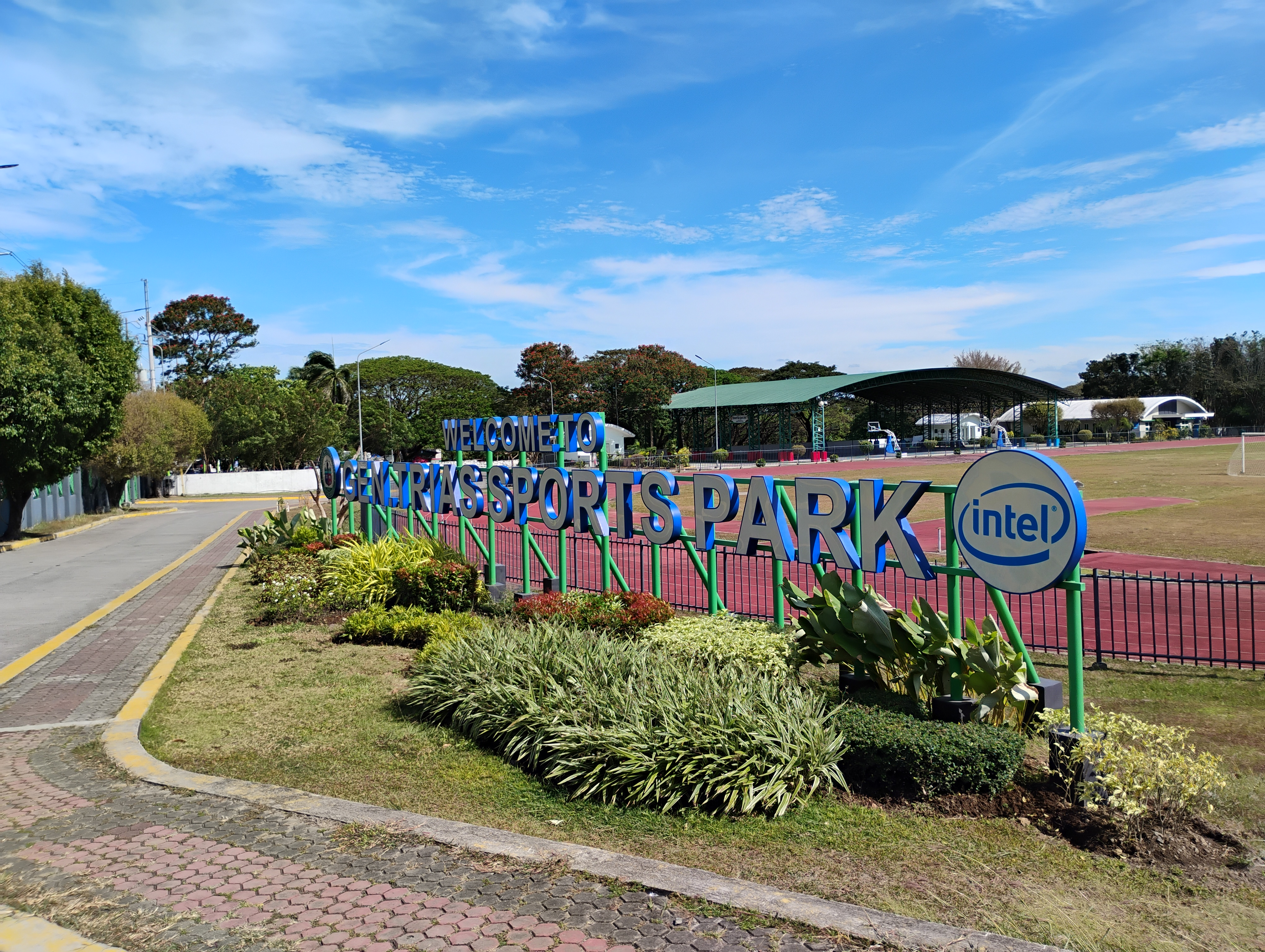
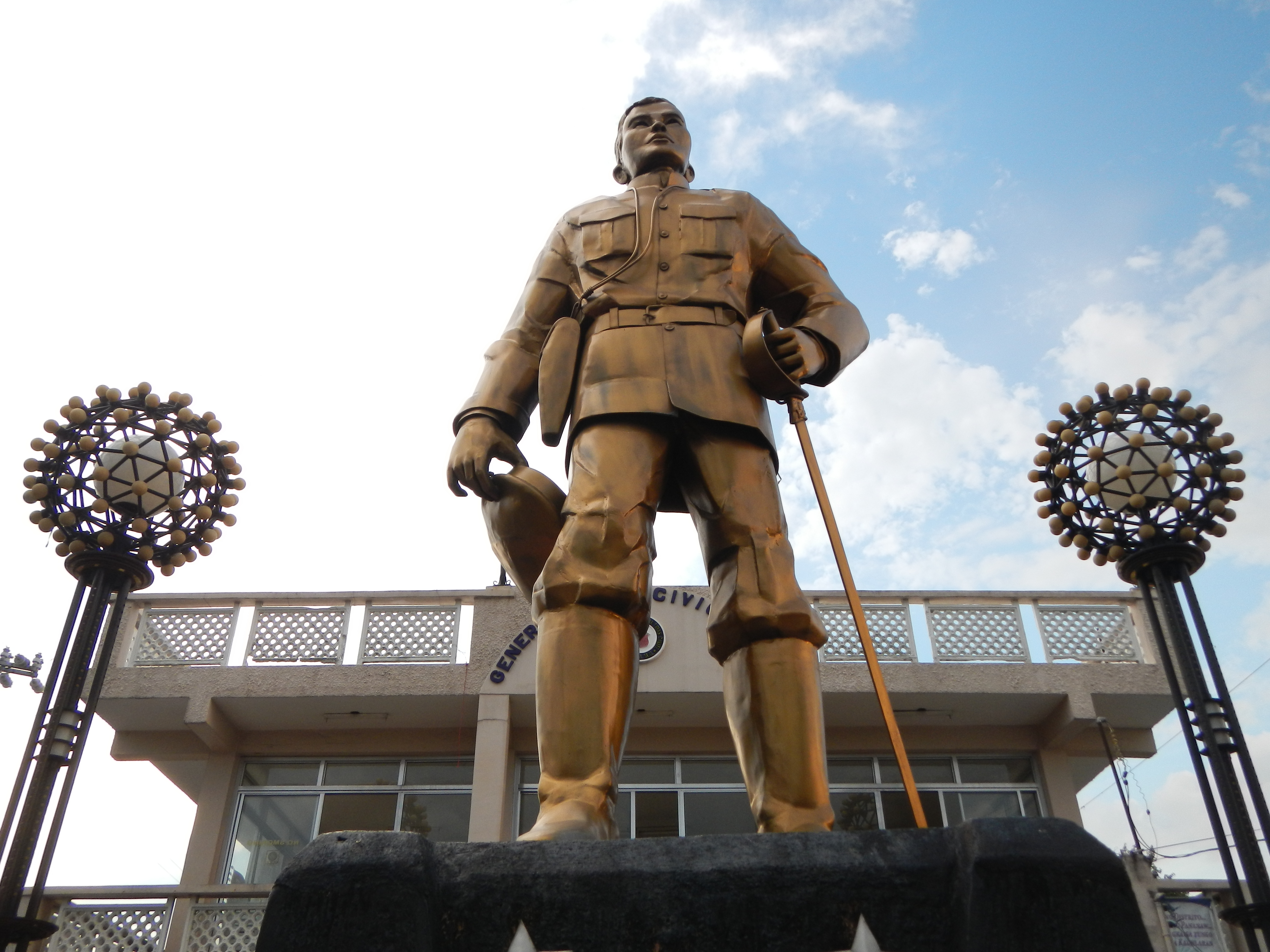
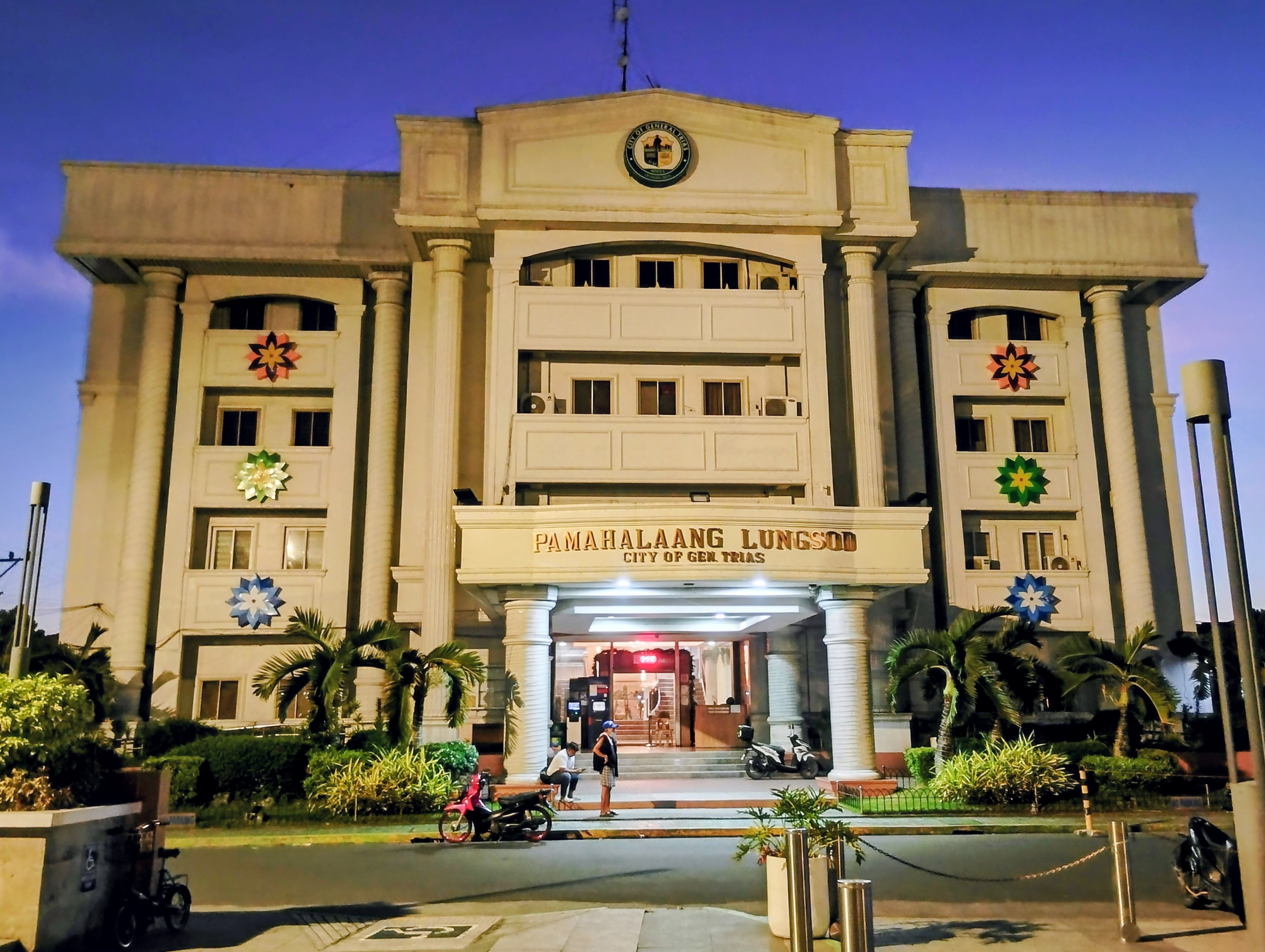
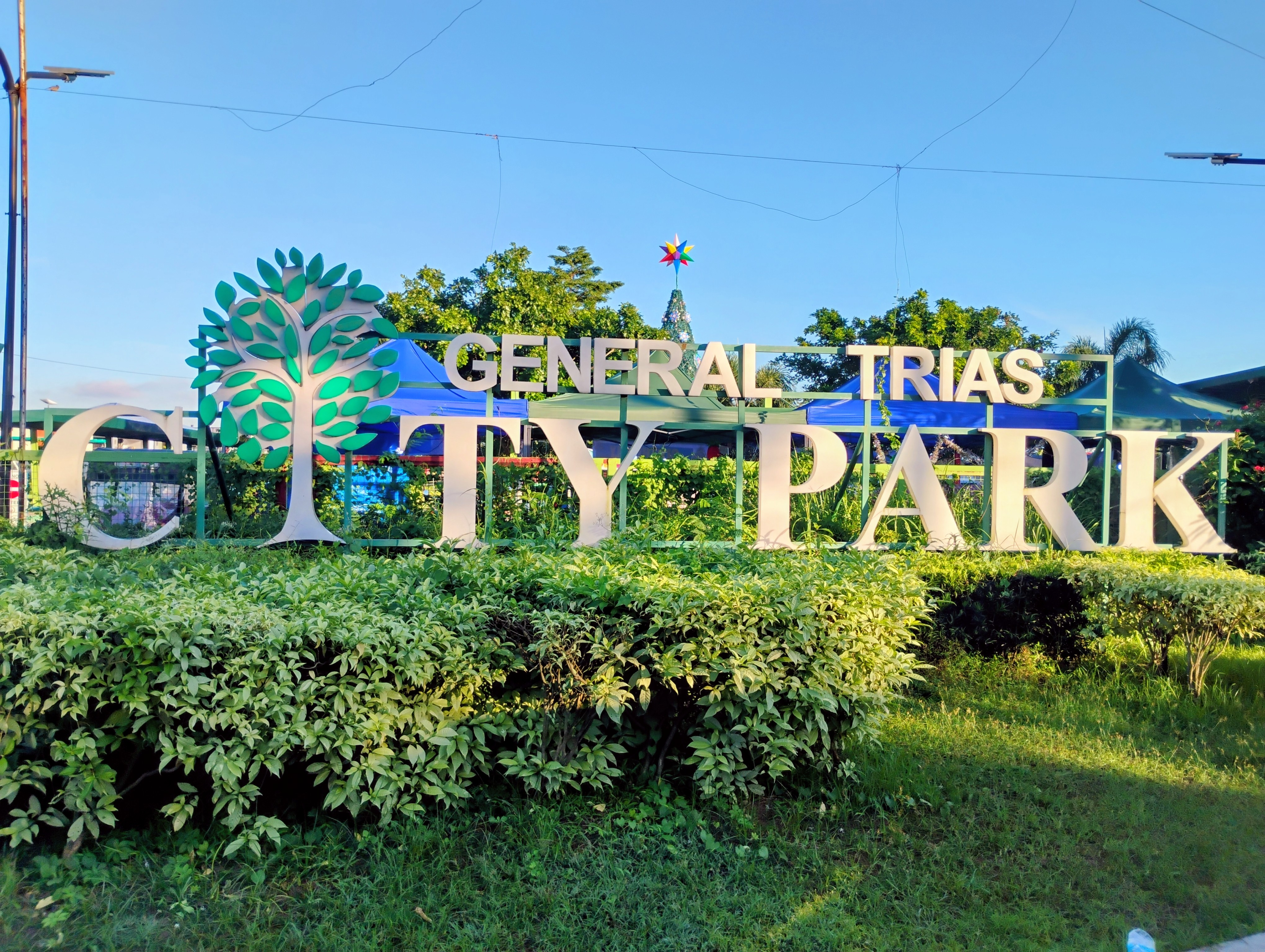
- (From top, left to right: St. Francis of Assisi Parish, Sports Park, Gen. Mariano Trias Monument, City Hall, City Park)

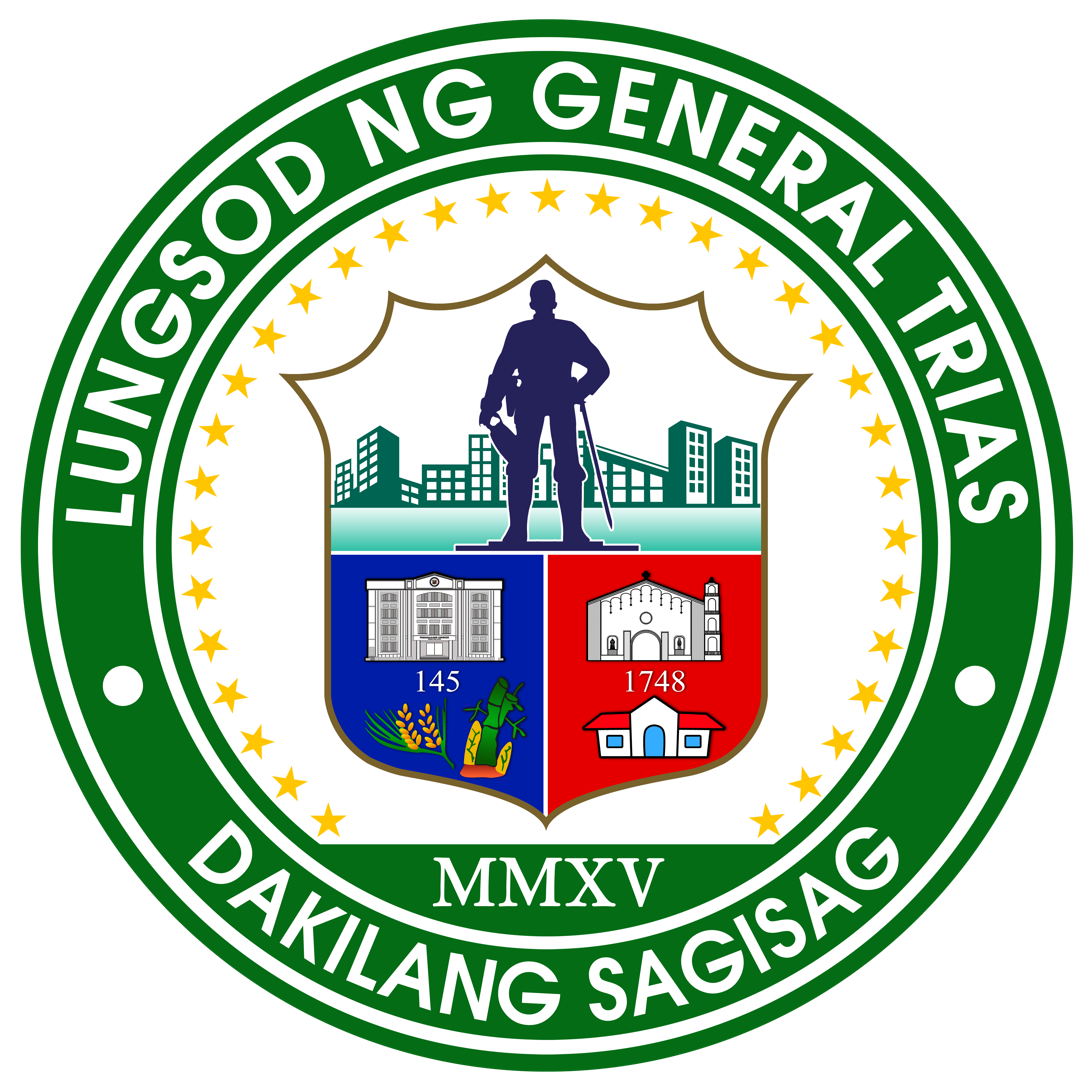
- Seal
- Nickname: GenTri
- Map of Cavite with General Trias highlighted
- Interactive map of General Trias
- Location within the Philippines
- Coordinates: 14°23′N 120°53′E
- Country: Philippines
- Region: Calabarzon
- Province: Cavite
- District: 6th district
- Founded: December 12, 1748 (as San Francisco de Malabon)
- Renamed: February 28, 1914 (as Malabon); February 24, 1920 (as General Trias)
- Cityhood: December 13, 2015
- Named for: Mariano Trías
- Barangays: 33 (see Barangays)

Government
  - Type: Sangguniang Panlungsod
  - Mayor: Luis A. Ferrer IV
  - Vice Mayor: Jonas Glyn P. Labuguen
  - Representative: Antonio A. Ferrer
  - City Council: Members: Jesse Raphael R. Grepo; Felix A. Grepo; Clarrisel J. Campaña; Kyle Jassel J. Salazar; J-M Vergel M. Columna; Isagani L. Culanding; Jowie S. Carampot; Kristine Jane M. Perdito; Vivencio Q. Lozares Jr.; Richard R. Parin; Alfredo S. Ching; Hernando M. Granados
  - Electorate: 212,830 voters (2025)

Area
  - Total: 90.01 km^{2} (34.75 sq mi)
- Elevation: 53 m (174 ft)
- Highest elevation: 426 m (1,398 ft)
- Lowest elevation: 0 m (0 ft)

Population (2024 census)
  - Total: 482,453
  - Density: 5,360/km^{2} (13,880/sq mi)
  - Households: 117,910
- Demonym: Gentriseño

Economy
  - Income class: 1st city income class
  - Poverty incidence: 6.57% (2023)
  - Revenue: ₱ 3,566 million (2024)
  - Assets: ₱ 7,698 million (2024)
  - Expenditure: ₱ 1,873 million (2024)
  - Liabilities: ₱ 504.2 million (2024)

Service provider
  - Electricity: Manila Electric Company (Meralco)
  - Water: General Trias Water Corporation (GTWC)
- Time zone: UTC+8 (PST)
- ZIP code: 4107
- PSGC: 042108000
- IDD : area code: +63 (0)46
- Native languages: Tagalog
- Major religions: Roman Catholicism; Protestantism; Islam
- Feast date: October 4
- Catholic diocese: Diocese of Imus
- Patron saint: Saint Francis of Assisi
- Website: generaltrias.gov.ph

General Trias ([hɛnɛˈɾal ˈtɾias]), officially the City of General Trias (Filipino: Lungsod ng General Trias), is a component city in the province of Cavite, Philippines. According to the 2024 census, it has a population of 482,453 people.

== Etymology ==
During the earlier part of the Spanish colonial period, General Trias was often referred to as Las Estancias (the ranches), which was once a part of Cavite el Viejo, the present-day Kawit. It was also called Malabón Grande. The name Malabón is derived from Tagalog, meaning "having many silt deposits".

The first reference seems to be more probable because General Mariano Trías, a noted writer, adopted the nom de guerre "Labong Grande". On the other hand, it was affixed to the appellation because at the time, the place was a vast wilderness covering Sitio Tejero, frequently called by the revolutionary as Salinas (present-day Rosario), Santa Cruz de Malabon or Malabon el Chico (present-day Tanza) and Tierra Alta (present-day Noveleta). When the town was made independent from Cavite el Viejo, it was finally called by its popular name San Francisco de Malabon, in honor of patron saint, Saint Francis of Assisi.

== History ==
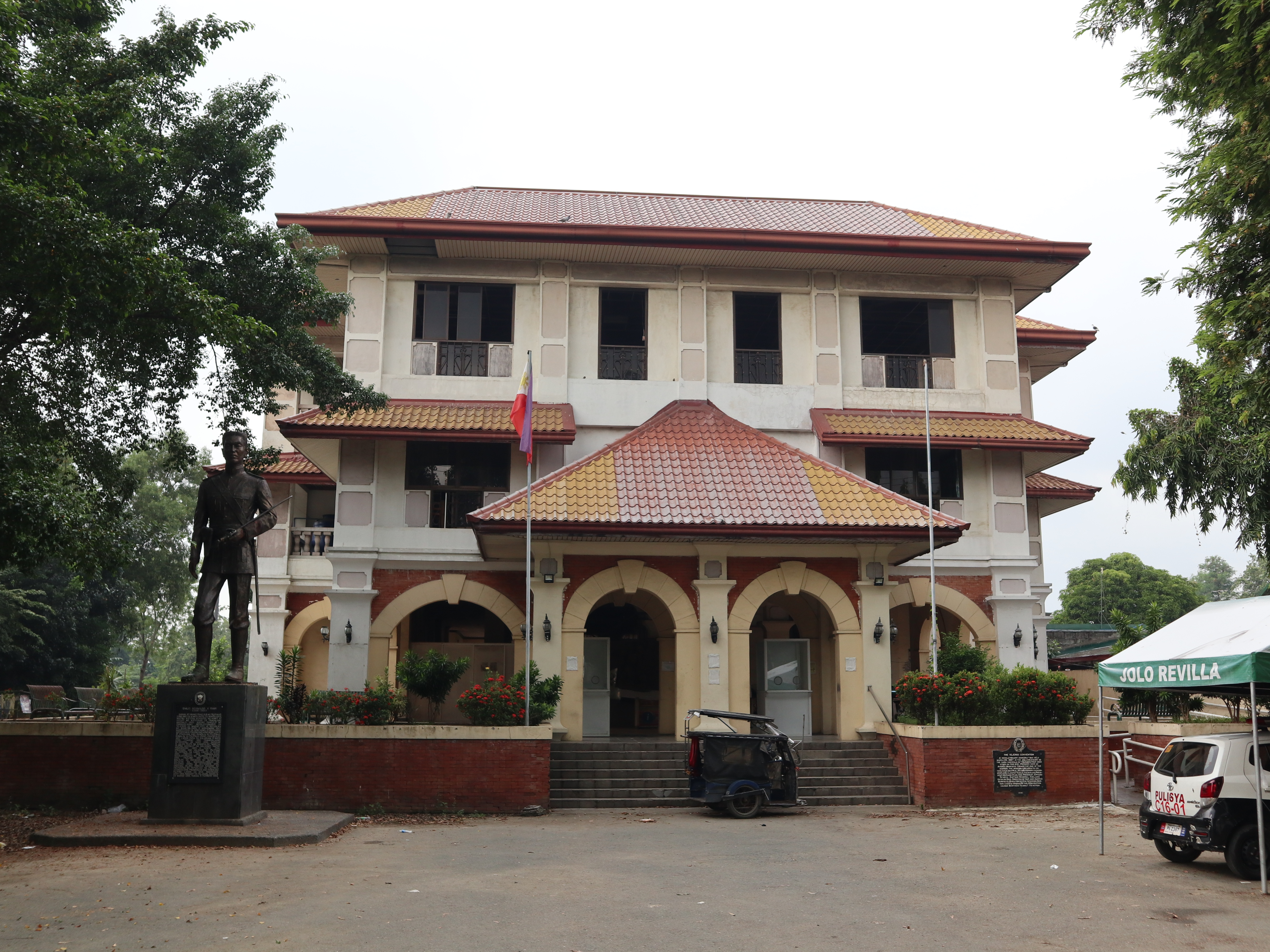
The site of the now demolished friar estate house in then San Francisco de Malabon where the Tejeros Convention was held on March 22, 1897.

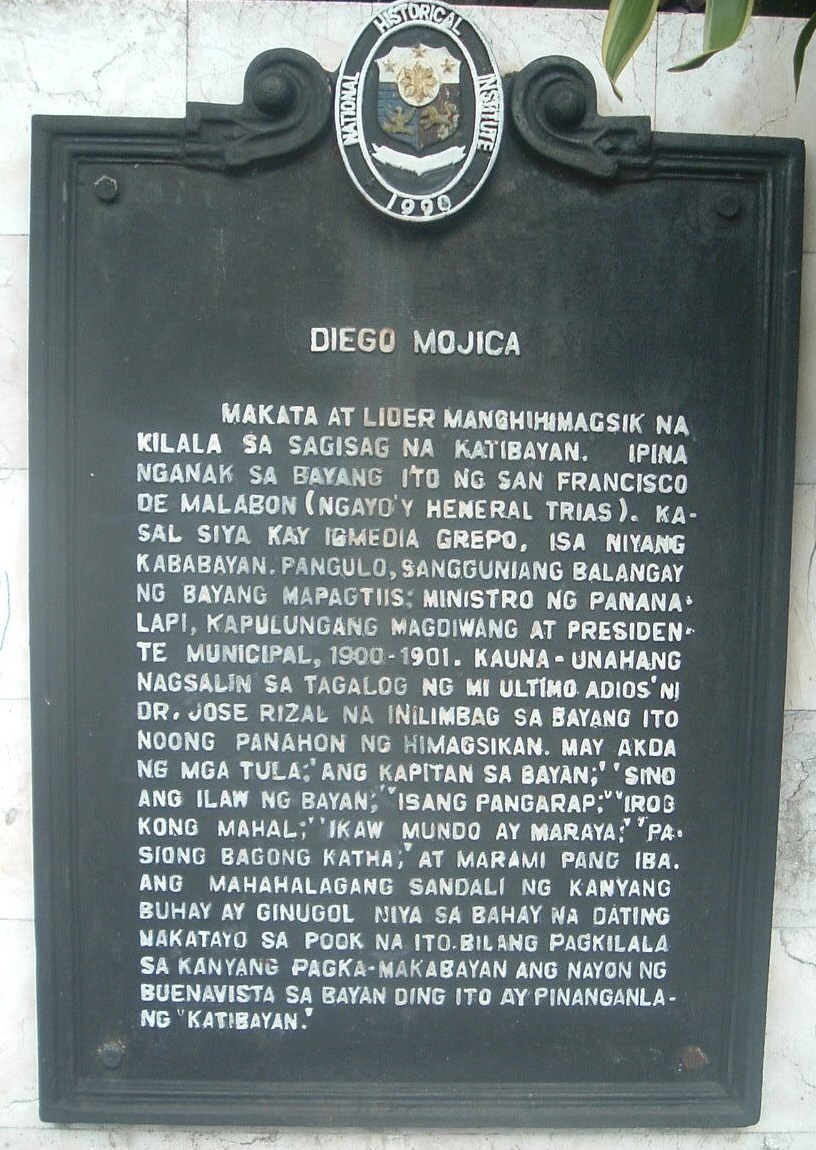
The Diego Mojica historical marker

=== Spanish Times ===
The 1818 Spanish census showed the area had 1,510 native families and 69 Spanish-Filipino families.

=== First Cry of Cavite ===
The first uprising in Cavite, known as the “First Cry of Cavite,” took place in San Francisco de Malabon at around 10:00 a.m. on August 31, 1896, when Filipino revolutionaries led by Mariano Trías, Diego Mojica, and Nicolas Portilla attacked the town tribunal in Pasong Kalabaw (now Santa Clara). This was followed by a second uprising at around noon in Tierra Alta, and a third in Cavite el Viejo between 2:00 and 3:00 p.m.

=== Tejeros Convention ===
A local chapter of the Katipunan, known as Balangay Mapagtiis had already been in existence in the place for sometime. known as *Balangay Mapagtiis*, had already been established in the area. The Sangguniang Bayang Magdiwang, led by General Mariano Álvarez of Tierra Alta, and the Sangguniang Bayang Mapagtiis of San Francisco de Malabon later merged to form the Magdiwang Council, with Álvarez as its president. The Magdiwang Council hosted the Tejeros Convention on March 22, 1897, at a friar estate house in Sitio Tejero (now part of Rosario). During the convention, General Emilio Aguinaldo was elected president, and Mariano Trías, then a lieutenant general, was elected vice president, establishing a revolutionary government that replaced the Katipunan.

=== American occupation ===
On October 15, 1903, Act No. 947 was approved by the Philippine Commission, merging the adjacent town of Santa Cruz de Malabon (present-day Tanza) with San Francisco de Malabon, with the latter designated as the municipal seat. In 1909, a resolution was passed by the San Francisco de Malabon municipal council to separate Santa Cruz de Malabon to become an independent municipality of its own; it took effect in 1910.

On February 28, 1914, Act No. 2390 was passed by the Philippine Assembly, changing the town's name to Malabon. On February 24, 1920, Act No. 2889 was approved, renaming the town after General Mariano Trías, who died six years earlier.

=== Cityhood ===
Then Senator Bongbong Marcos delivering a sponsorship speech on the charter of the city in 2015.

On August 19, 2015, President Benigno Aquino III signed Republic Act No. 10675 which converted the municipality of General Trias into a component city of Cavite. The bill finally came into full effect after majority of the city's residents voted yes to cityhood through a plebiscite. General Trias thus became the seventh city in the province and the 145th in the country.

=== Lone District of General Trias ===
On September 14, 2018, President Rodrigo Duterte signed Republic Act No. 11069, reapportioning the province of Cavite into eight legislative districts to make General Trias the province's sixth legislative district.

== Geography ==
General Trias is an inland city of Cavite located 33 kilometers (21 mi) southwest of Manila and 23 kilometers (14 mi) from Imus. It straddles the northeastern part of the province. The city is surrounded by the municipalities of Rosario and Noveleta in the north, by Tanza and Trece Martires in the west, by Amadeo in the south, Silang in the southeast, and the cities of Dasmariñas and Imus to the east. General Trias has a total land area of 81.46 square kilometers (31.45 sq mi).

=== Climate ===
Unlike the tropical weather of its lowlands and lower highlands, the upland villages of Panungyanan and Javalera enjoy tropical highland weather due to their proximity to Tagaytay and Amadeo, which is south of the city.

Climate data for General Trias, Cavite
| Month | Jan | Feb | Mar | Apr | May | Jun | Jul | Aug | Sep | Oct | Nov | Dec | Year |
|---|---|---|---|---|---|---|---|---|---|---|---|---|---|
| Mean daily maximum °C (°F) | 29 (84) | 30 (86) | 32 (90) | 34 (93) | 32 (90) | 31 (88) | 29 (84) | 29 (84) | 29 (84) | 30 (86) | 30 (86) | 29 (84) | 30 (87) |
| Mean daily minimum °C (°F) | 20 (68) | 20 (68) | 21 (70) | 22 (72) | 24 (75) | 25 (77) | 24 (75) | 24 (75) | 24 (75) | 23 (73) | 22 (72) | 21 (70) | 23 (73) |
| Average precipitation mm (inches) | 10 (0.4) | 10 (0.4) | 12 (0.5) | 27 (1.1) | 94 (3.7) | 153 (6.0) | 206 (8.1) | 190 (7.5) | 179 (7.0) | 120 (4.7) | 54 (2.1) | 39 (1.5) | 1,094 (43) |
| Average rainy days | 5.2 | 4.5 | 6.4 | 9.2 | 19.7 | 24.3 | 26.9 | 25.7 | 24.4 | 21.0 | 12.9 | 9.1 | 189.3 |
Source: Meteoblue

=== Barangays ===
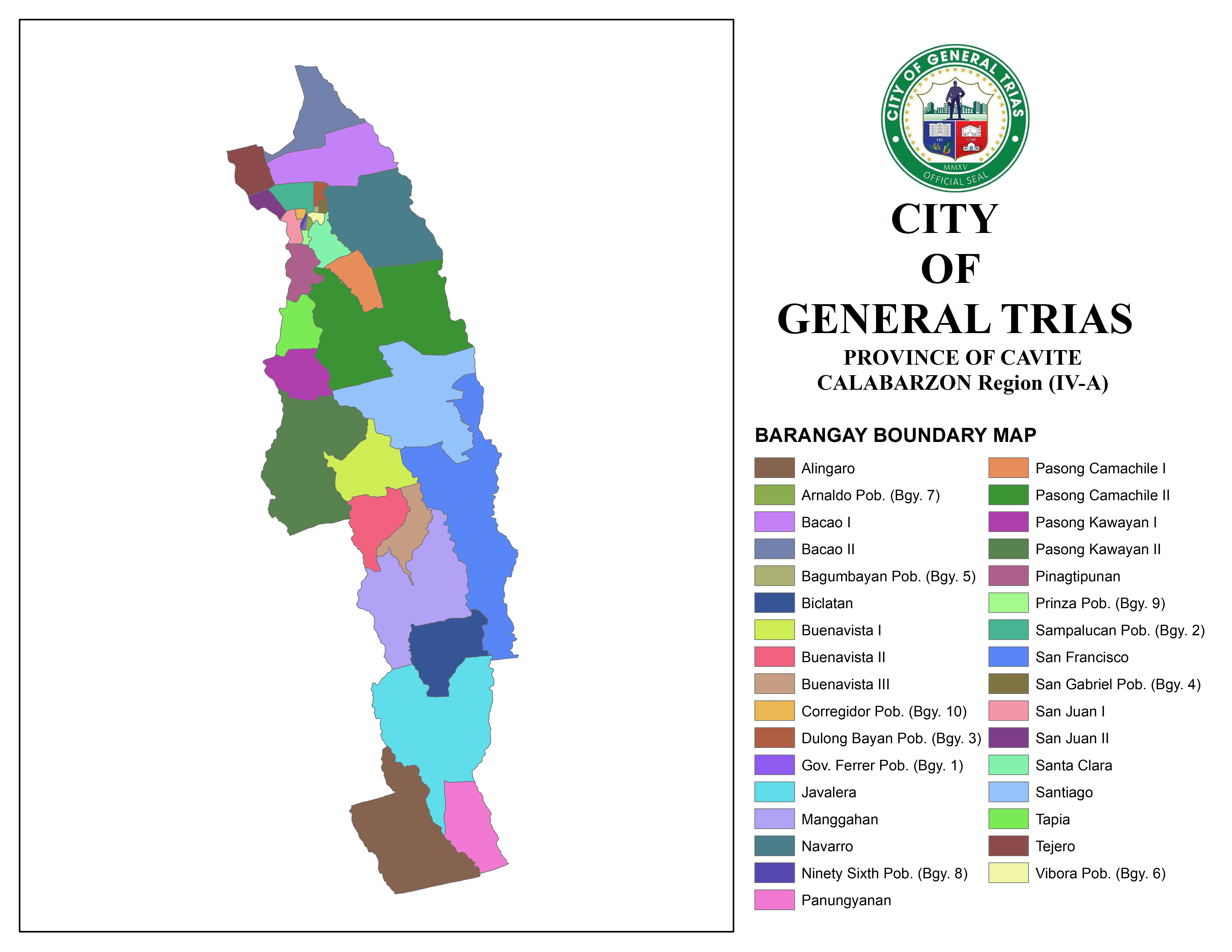
Map showing the constituent barangays of General Trias.

General Trias is politically subdivided into 33 barangays, as indicated below and the image herein. Each barangay consists of puroks and some have sitios.

- Alingaro
- Arnaldo (Poblacion)
- Bacao I
- Bacao II
- Bagumbayan (Poblacion)
- Biclatan
- Buenavista I
- Buenavista II
- Buenavista III
- Corregidor (Poblacion)
- Dulongbayan
- Governor Ferrer (Poblacion)
- Javalera
- Manggahan
- Navarro
- Panungyanan
- Pasong Camachile I
- Pasong Camachile II
- Pasong Kawayan I
- Pasong Kawayan II
- Pinagtipunan
- Prinza
- Sampalucan (Poblacion)
- Santiago
- San Francisco
- San Gabriel (Poblacion)
- San Juan I
- San Juan II
- Santa Clara
- Tapia
- Tejero
- Vibora (Poblacion)
- 1896th (Poblacion)

== Demographics ==
Population census of General Trias
| Year | Pop. | ±% p.a. |
|---|---|---|
| 1903 | 9,515 | — |
| 1918 | 9,672 | +0.11% |
| 1939 | 16,611 | +2.61% |
| 1948 | 15,963 | −0.44% |
| 1960 | 21,618 | +2.56% |
| 1970 | 29,635 | +3.20% |
| 1975 | 34,807 | +3.28% |
| 1980 | 39,745 | +2.69% |
| 1990 | 52,888 | +2.90% |
| 1995 | 66,837 | +4.48% |
| 2000 | 107,691 | +10.77% |
| 2007 | 218,387 | +10.24% |
| 2010 | 243,322 | +4.01% |
| 2015 | 314,303 | +5.00% |
| 2020 | 450,583 | +7.88% |
| 2024 | 482,453 | +1.65% |
Source: Philippine Statistics Authority

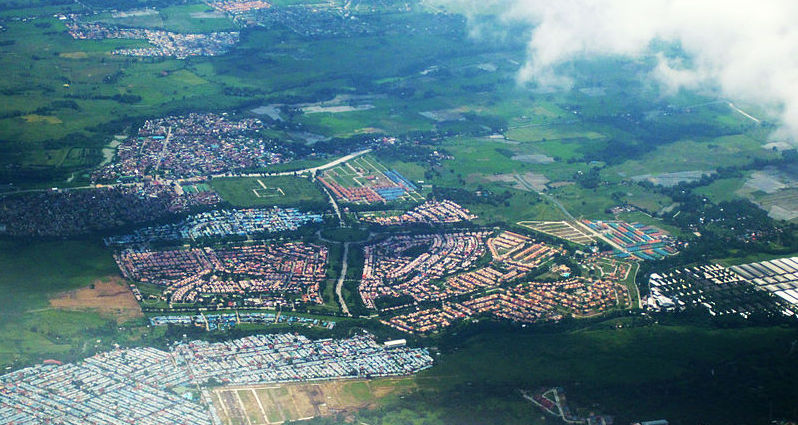
Aerial view of General Trias with gated communities

In the 2024 census, the population of General Trias was 482,453 people, with a density of 5,900 inhabitants per square kilometer or 15,000 inhabitants per square mile.

=== Religion ===
A vast majority of inhabitants are Roman Catholics while Protestantism is the second largest denomination in the city and some migrants from Mindanao practicing Islam.

=== Language ===
Tagalog and English are the most used languages in General Trias.

== Government ==
=== Local government ===
City of General Trias (2025–2028)
Mayor
Luis IV "Jon-Jon" Ferrer (NUP)
Vice Mayor
Jonas Glyn P. Labuguen (NUP)
Sangguniang Panlungsod Members
| Martin Nicholo A. Ferrer | Isagain L. Culanding |
| Jesse Raphael R. Grepo | Kristine Mae P. Fortuno |
| Kyle Jassel J. Salazar | Clarissel J. Campaña-Moral |
| Kristine Jane M. Perdtio-Barison | Joel T. Prudente |
| Gary A. Grepo | Alfredo S. Ching |
| J-M Vergel M. Columna | Richard R. Parin |

Pursuant to Chapter II, Title II, Book III of Republic Act No. 7160 or the Local Government Code of 1991, the city government is to be composed of a mayor (alkalde), a vice mayor (bise alkalde) and members (kagawad) of the legislative branch Sangguniang Panlungsod alongside a secretary to the said legislature, all of which are elected to a three-year term and are eligible to run for three consecutive terms.

=== Executive ===
As with every Philippine city, the city mayor serves as General Trias' chief executive. Elected to a term of three years and limited to three consecutive terms, the mayor appoints the directors of each city department, which include the office of administration, engineering office, information office, legal office, and treasury office. The current mayor is Luis Ferrer IV.

The city's vice mayor performs duties as acting mayor in the absence of the mayor. The vice mayor automatically succeeds as mayor upon the death of the incumbent, or if the mayor is unable to fulfil their duties. The vice mayor also convenes the Sangguniang Panlungsod, the city's legislative body. The current vice mayor is Jonas Glyn Labuguen.

=== Legislative ===
Within the city, the City Board, or Sangguniang Panlungsod, crafts all city ordinances, performs appropriation of city funds, issues franchises and permits, imposes fees on city services, and exercises other duties and powers as stipulated by the Local Government Code of 1991.

Under R.A. 10675 Article V Section 10 (a). General Trias is entitled to a City Board composed of 10 members.

== Economy ==
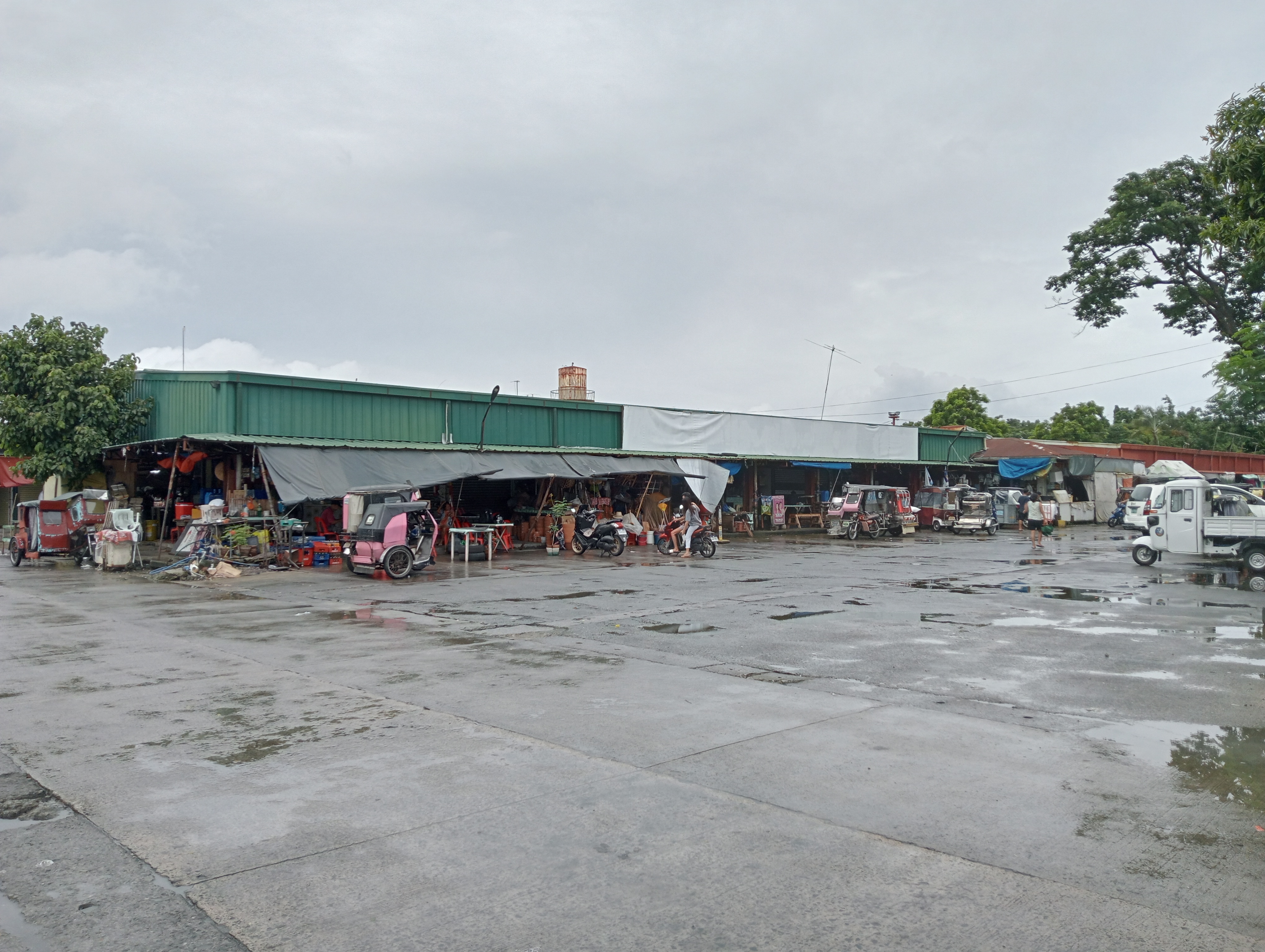
General Trias Public Market

Poverty incidence of General Trias (%)

Source: Philippine Statistics Authority

=== Industrial estates ===
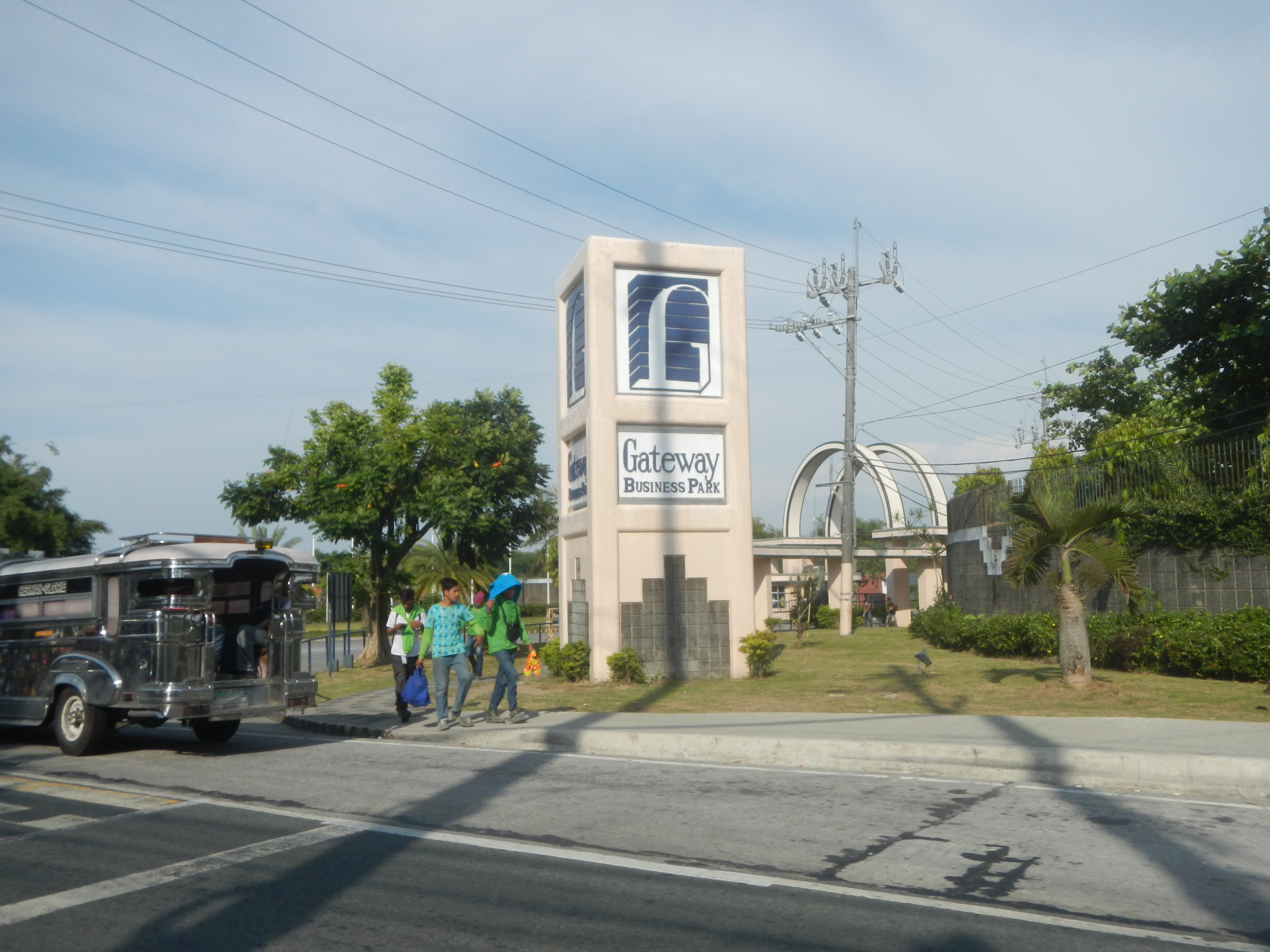
Gateway Business Park

General Trias has been gradually undergoing industrialization since the turn of the 21st century. Several major industrial estates, such as Gateway Business Park, a world class business community in Javalera and the New Cavite Industrial City (NCIC) in Manggahan, have chosen General Trias to be their home base.

The Cavite Export Processing Zone (CEPZ) occupies about 0.60 square kilometers (0.23 sq mi) of land belonging to General Trias. 110 factories operate in the CEPZ. The others are the Golden Gate Industrial Park (Phase I) in Buenavista II and Golden Gate Industrial Park (Phase II) in Panungyanan while the rest are found at Barangay Manggahan, Barangay San Francisco and along Governor's Drive.

=== Private subdivisions ===
General Trias is considered one of the new frontiers of growth and development in the Calabarzon area as attested by the giant industrial subdivisions located in the city. Many of these are in the highland barangay of Manggahan, located along Governor's Drive, the barangays of San Francisco, Santiago on the Arnaldo Highway, and barangay Pasong Camachille II on Open Canal Road.

=== Township developments ===
From small private subdivisions, General Trias has been a leading destination for large scale township developments in recent years. To date, a total of 5 townships under construction and development in the city namely:

- The 140 hectare Maple Grove, situated on Brgys. Bacao 1 and 2, San Juan II, and Tejero.
- The 3400 hectare Lancaster New City, covering the Brgys. of Navarro, Bacao 1, Pasong Camchille 1 & 2, Pasong Kawayan 1, Santiago, Sta. Clara, Tapia.
- The 300 hectare Riverpark North, on Brgys. Pasong Camchille 1 & 2. and
- The 300 hectare Riverpark South, on Brgys. Pasong Kawayan 1 & 2 and Santiago.
- The 200 hectare Allegria, located in Brgy. San Francisco.

These townships helps generate jobs and contribute with General Trias' Tax Revenues to be one of the highest in the Province of Cavite.

=== Leisure and shopping malls ===
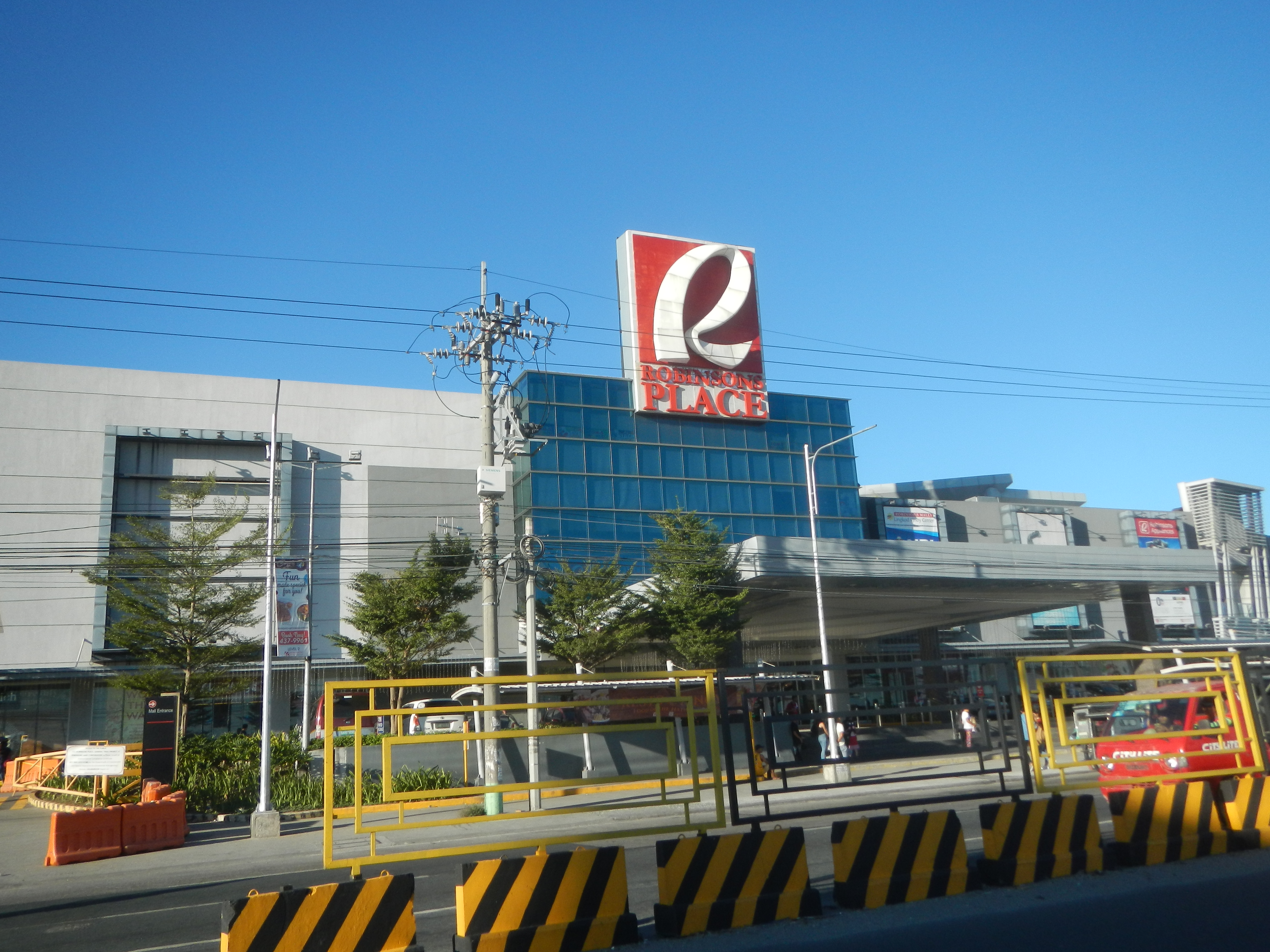
Robinsons Place General Trias in 2018

Located at the Tejero intersection and opened in May 2016, the 55,000-square-meter (590,000 sq ft) Robinsons Place General Trias (now Robinsons General Trias) is Robinson's fourth shopping mall in the province and the first full-scale mall in General Trias.

On the southern part of the city, lies one of the biggest Golf and Country residential estate Eagle Ridge Golf and Country Club. It covers about 700 hectares (1,700 acres), which makes it one of the largest residential estates in the country. The Golf & Country Club, which is one of the components of the Eagle Ridge development, is nearing its completion with three playable golf courses and two operational satellite clubhouses.

The 300-hectare (740-acre) Eagle Ridge Residential expanse features a gated housing community; the integral component of the project will make up the whole concept of Eagle Ridge as a golf and residential site.

Since the fourth quarter of 2017, a number of shopping malls and areas are currently being built, including Vista Mall General Trias.

== Festival ==
General Trias celebrates its Valenciana Festival every year. Valenciana, a variation of the Valencian paella, was first popularized in General Trias and became part of their culture.

== Infrastructure ==
=== Local government projects ===
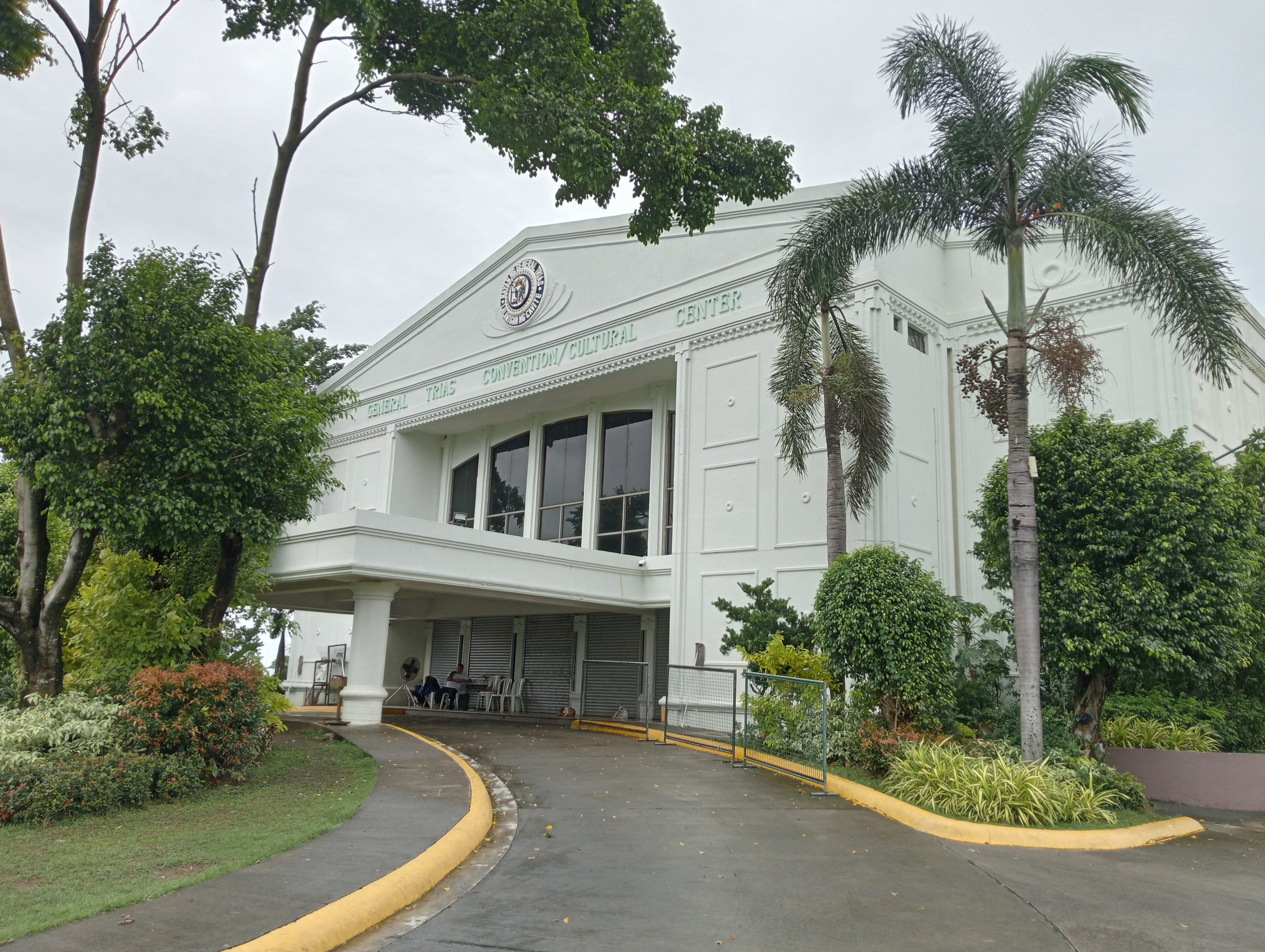
General Trias Convention/Cultural Center

The city's master plan is to achieve an agro-industrial and residential balance. The city has built recreational amenities such as the General Trias Convention/Cultural Center, General Trias Sports Center, Sports Park and city parks. Since its cityhood, numerous renovations of public infrastructure were done including the building of General Trias City Hall-Manggahan Annex and the takeover of the General Trias Medicare Hospital run by the provincial government converted into the City of General Trias Medicare Hospital run by the city government. Multiple road-widening activities were conducted to aid traffic flow at Arnaldo Highway, Governor Ferrer Drive, Crisanto M. De Los Reyes Avenue, and Governor's Drive. Additionally, the city also built diversion roads to ease traffic congestion and provides mobility to Governor Ferrer Drive of Barangay Buenavista 1 to Arnaldo Highway of Barangay Santiago (Mayor's Drive).

=== Transportation ===
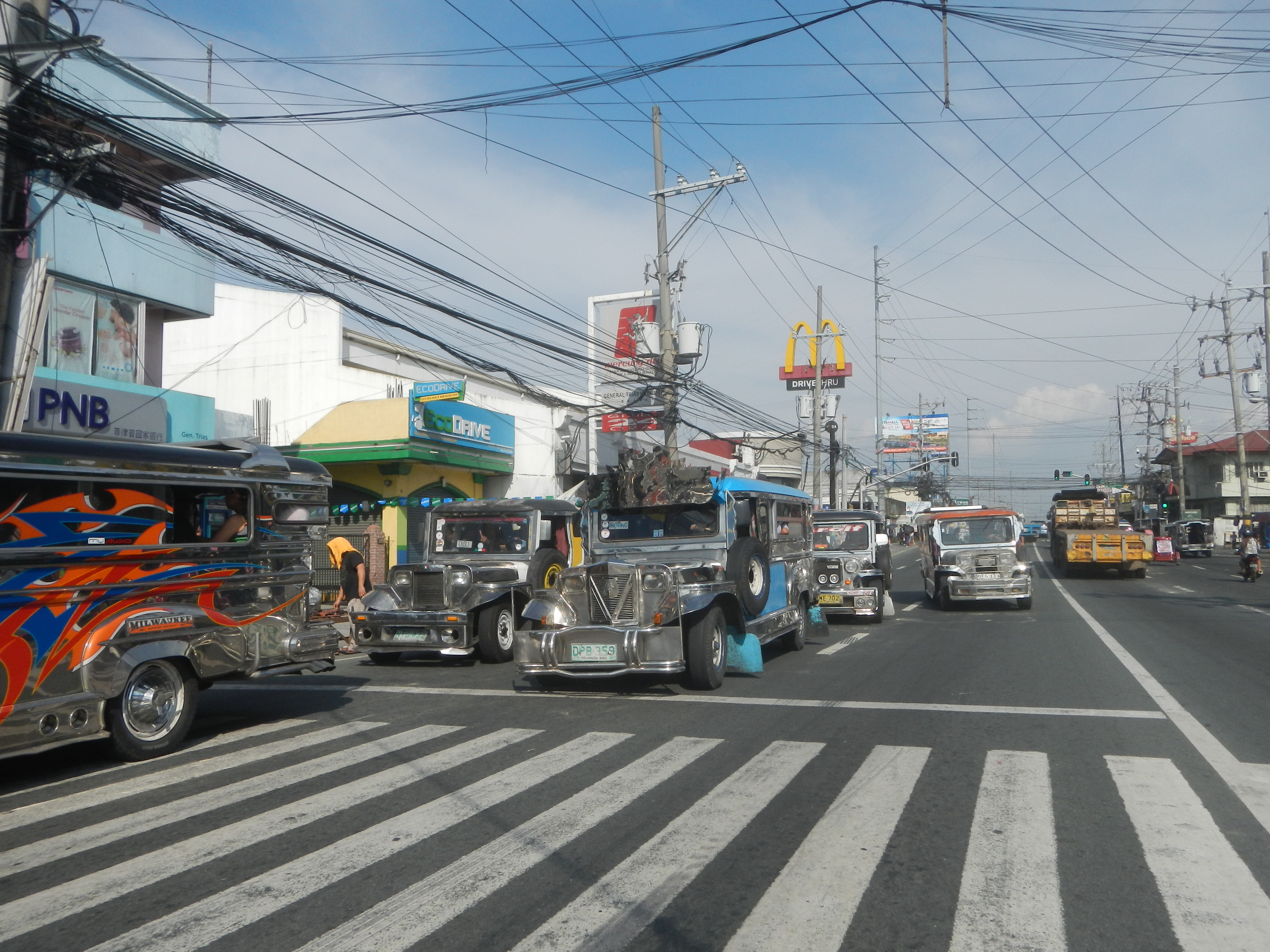
Jeepneys plying Governor's Drive in Barangay Manggahan

General Trias is connected to the C-6 Expressway connecting North and South Luzon and the Cavite–Laguna Expressway's development connecting CAVITEX to SLEX. The proposed expansion of the LRT Line 6 from Bacoor to Dasmariñas would also benefit the city, providing fast access from General Trias to Metro Manila.

=== Healthcare ===
Several hospitals, both private and government-owned, have also sprouted throughout General Trias ranging from government health centers to private clinics to complete hospitals. GenTri Medical Center and Hospital Inc. and Gentri Doctors Medical Center to name a few are among the biggest hospitals in the entire province of Cavite.

== Education ==
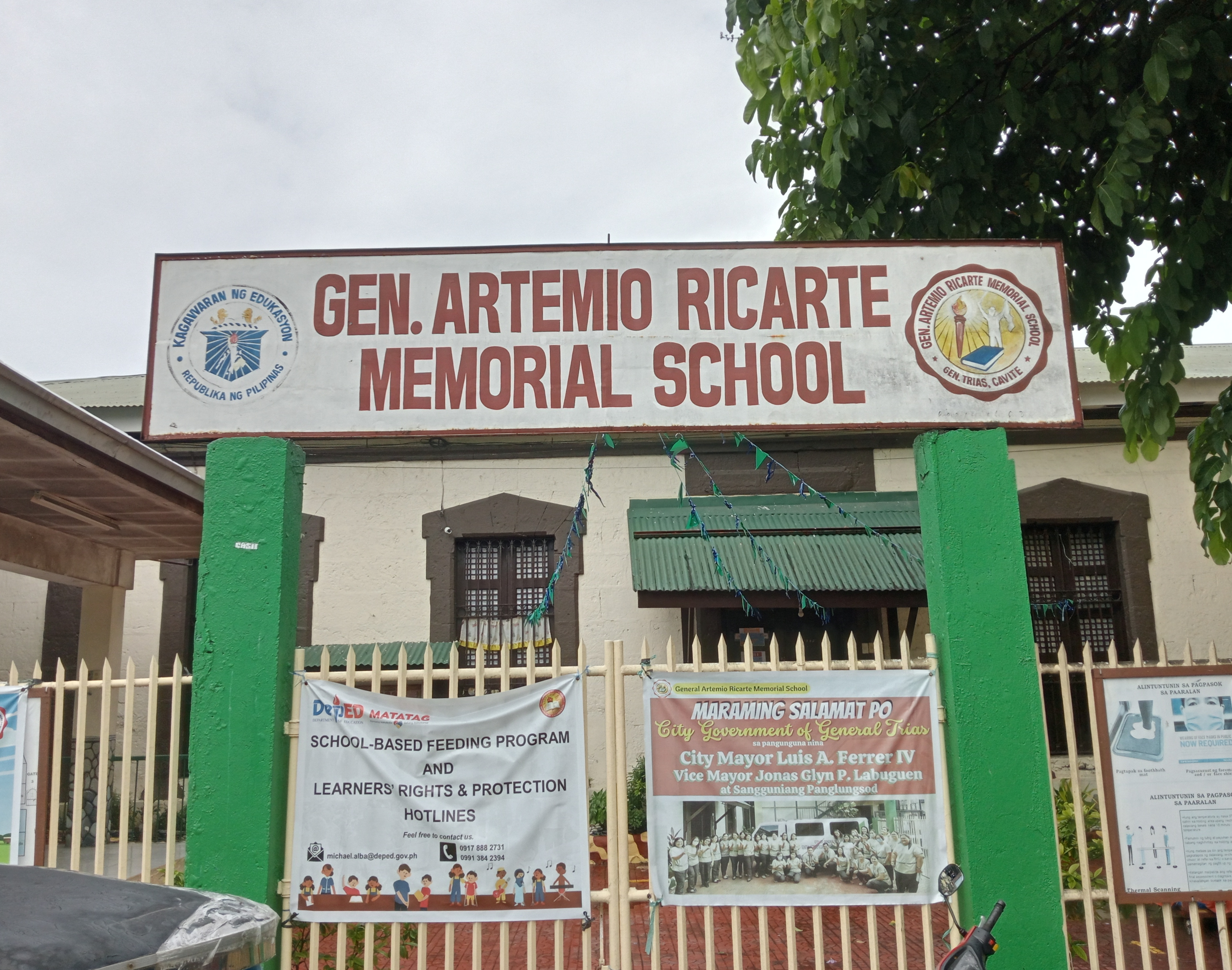
Gen. Artemio Ricarte Elementary School, located in the city proper

General Trias is home to several educational institutions, notably Lyceum of the Philippines University-Cavite campus, Cavite State University-General Trias campus, which was established in 2012, and the AMA Computer University located inside Ara Vista Village in Barangay Biclatan. Also in General Trias there are several private and public elementary and high schools which is supervised by its own DepEd City School Division.

== Notable personalities ==
- Mariano Trías (1868-1914), considered the first de facto Vice President of the revolutionary government established at the Tejeros Convention. The town was renamed in his honor after the Revolution.
- Kokoy De Santos (born 1998), actor.
- Maloi Ricalde (born 2002), singer, member of Bini, and actress.

== Sister cities ==
- Tozawa, Yamagata, Japan

== See also ==
- List of renamed cities and municipalities in the Philippines
