= Morong =

Morong may refer to:

- Josephine Morong Runnels, wife of John Harvey Gahan
- Thomas Morong (1827-1894), botanist
- Morong, Bataan, a municipality in the Philippines
- Morong, Rizal, a municipality in the Philippines
- Morong (district), now a part of the province of Rizal
- Morong, a sub-village of Umalsat, Tehsil Yasin, Ghizer District, Pakistan
- Morong, Guzhang (默戎镇), a town of Guzhang County, Hunan, China.
