= Umalsat =

Village in Yasin Valley, Pakistan

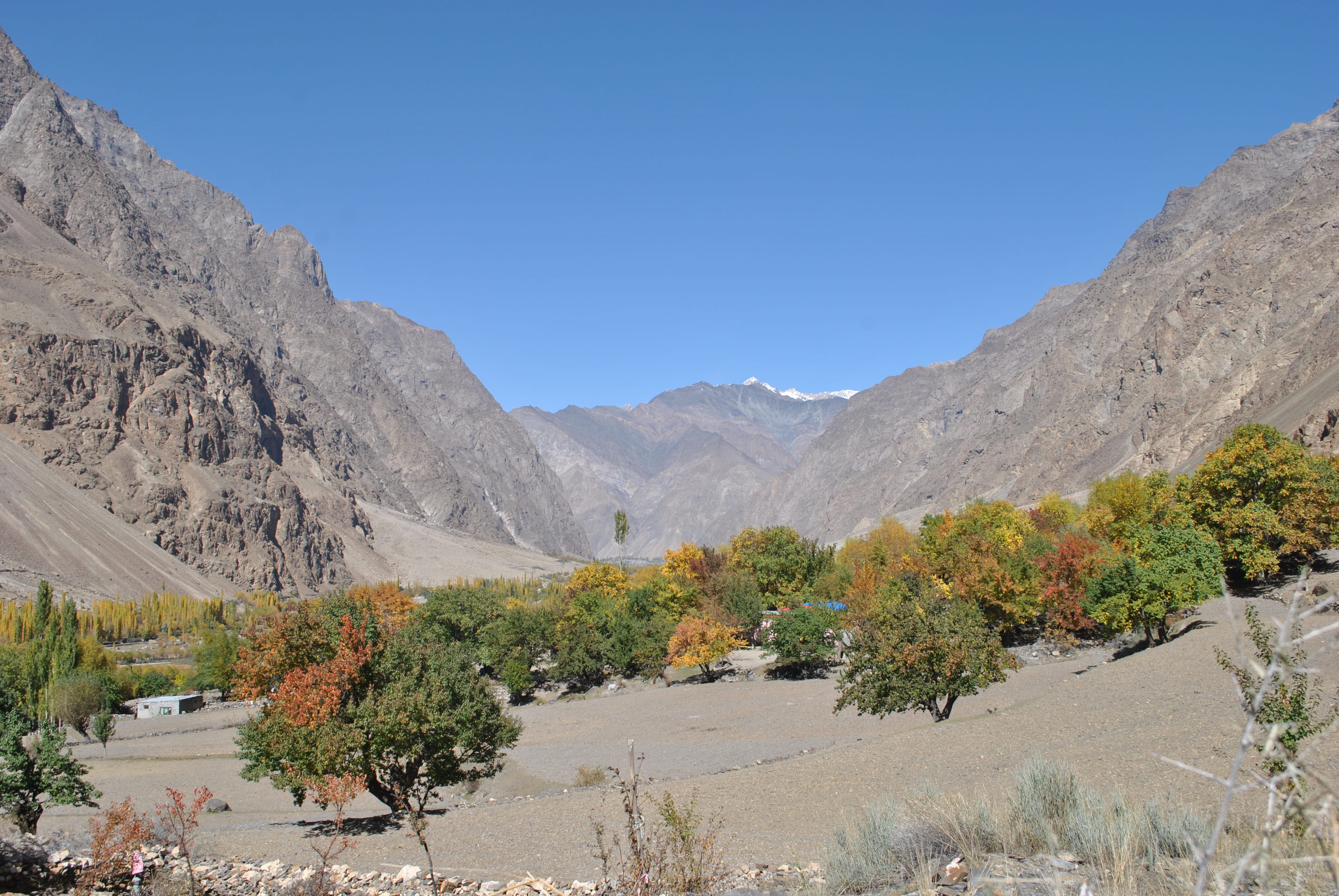
View of apricot trees in autumn season, in Umalsat Yasin Valley.

Umalsat (املست) is a remote village in Tehsil Yasin, Gupis-Yasin District, Pakistan, situated at the extreme north of Pakistan close to the border with Afghanistan.
