= Amadeo, Cavite =

Municipality in Cavite, Philippines

Amadeo
- Municipality
- Municipality of Amadeo
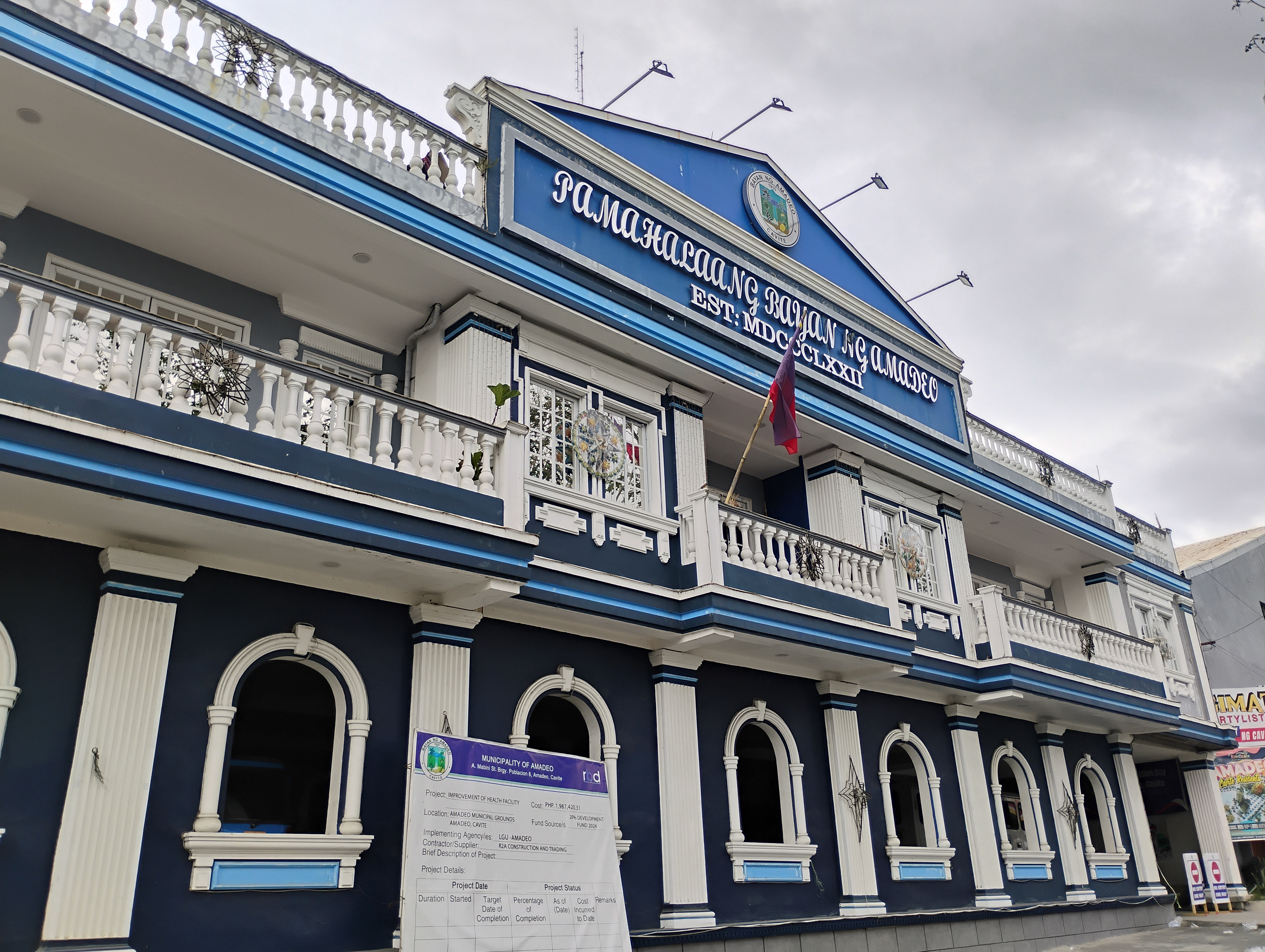
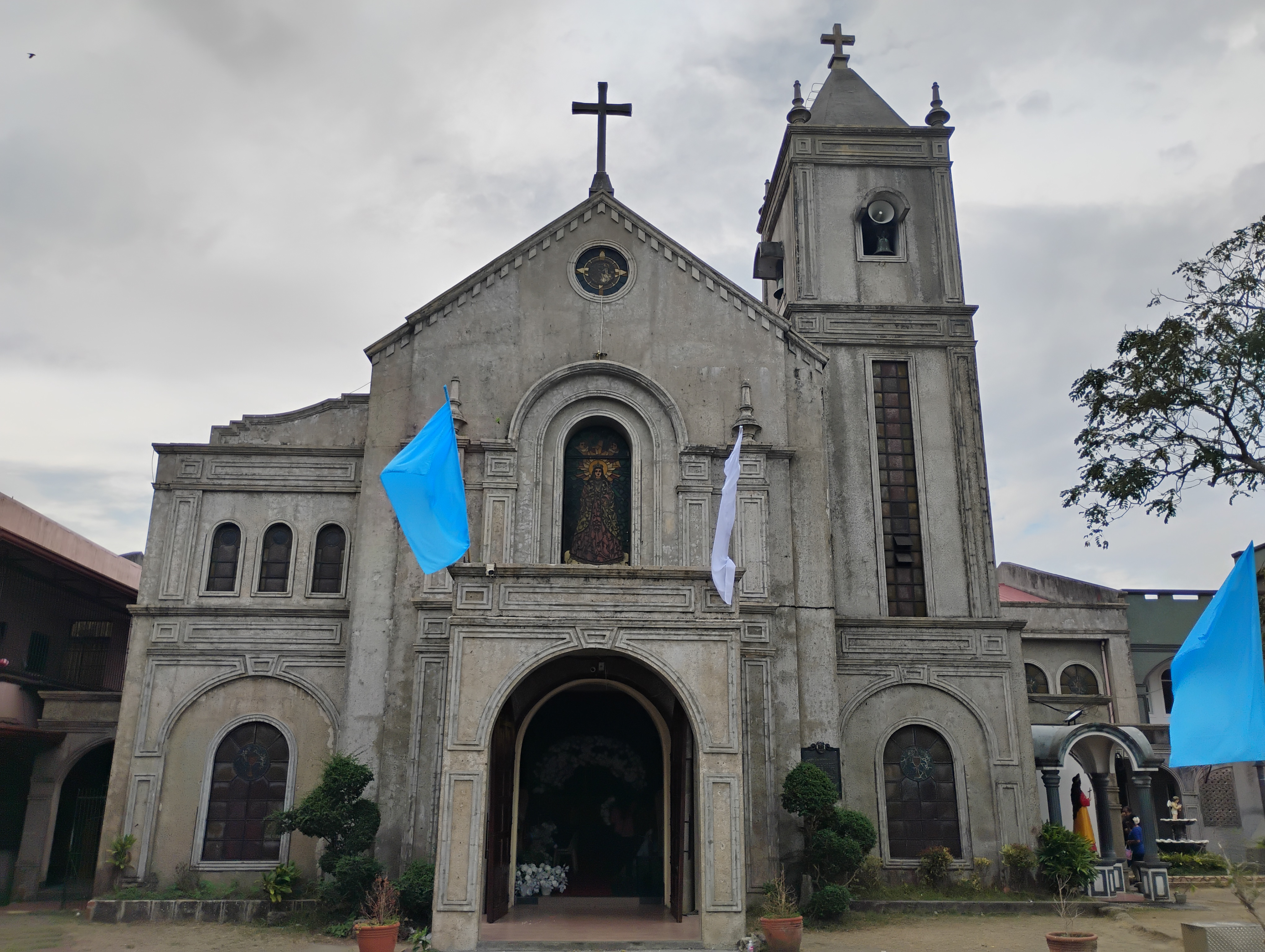
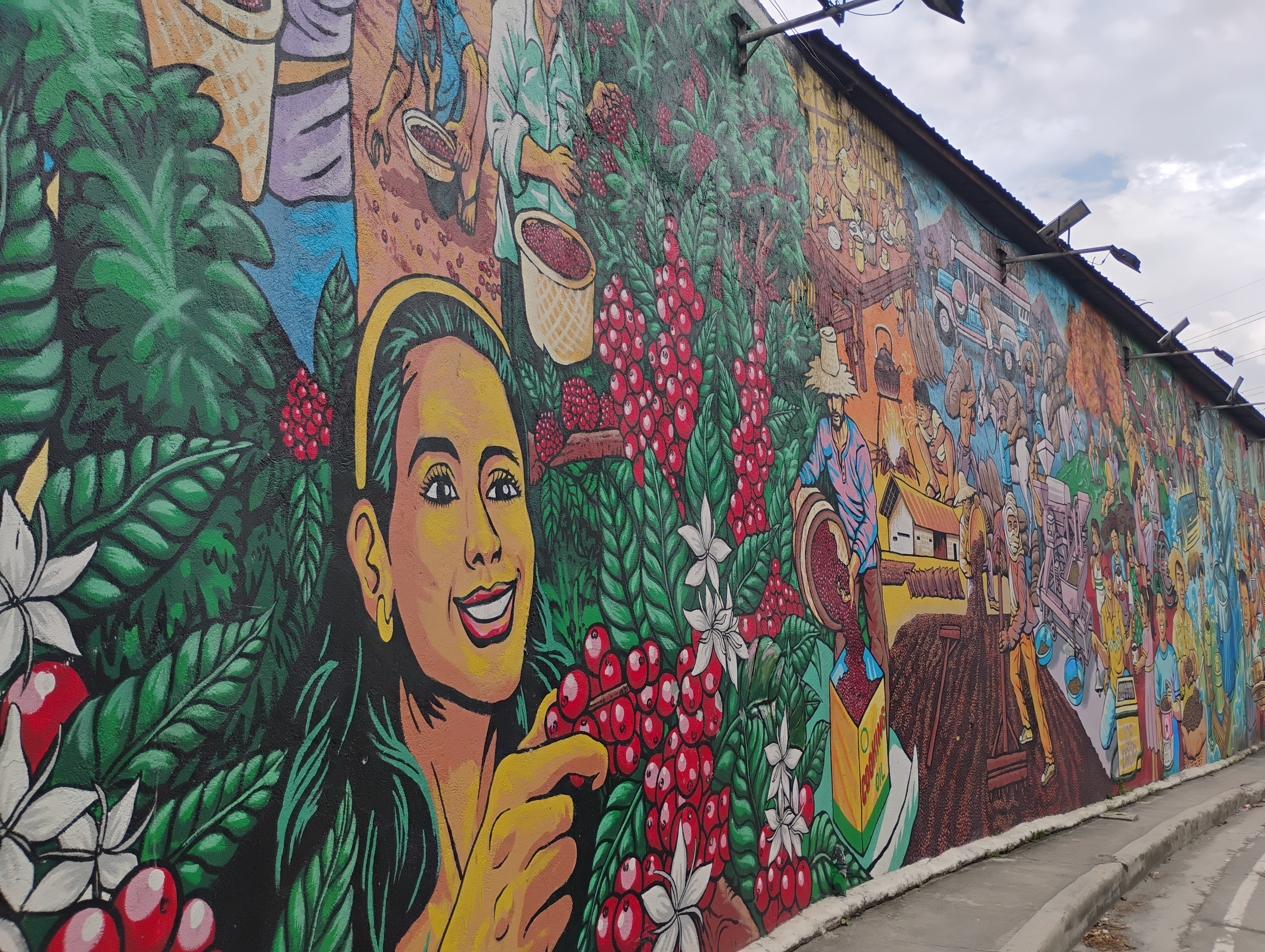
- Municipal Hall Saint Mary Magdalene Parish Church Amadeo Coffee Culture and Heritage Mural

- Seal
- Nickname: Coffee Capital of the Philippines
- Motto: Tapat may Integridad at Kaagapay ng Lahat
- Map of Cavite with Amadeo highlighted
- Interactive map of Amadeo
- Location within the Philippines
- Coordinates: 14°10′22″N 120°55′40″E
- Country: Philippines
- Region: Calabarzon
- Province: Cavite
- District: 7th district
- Founded: July 15, 1872
- Annexation to Silang: October 15, 1903
- Chartered: January 1915
- Founded by: Rafael Izquierdo y Gutiérrez
- Named after: King Amadeo I of Spain
- Barangays: 26 (see Barangays)

Government
  - Type: Sangguniang Bayan
  - Mayor: Jose R. Domingo Jr.
  - Vice Mayor: Joseph R. Legaspi
  - Representative: Crispin Diego D. Remulla
  - Municipal Council: Members: Marlon B. Bawalan; Joel V. Iyaya; Ryan P. Causaren; Regalado A. Borja; Michelle Anne A. Cosing; Carlos B. Garcia; Jade L. Cortez; Jeric M. Bawar
  - Electorate: 28,753 voters (2025)

Area
  - Total: 36.92 km^{2} (14.25 sq mi)
- Elevation: 357 m (1,171 ft)
- Highest elevation: 697 m (2,287 ft)
- Lowest elevation: 95 m (312 ft)

Population (2024 census)
  - Total: 44,190
  - Density: 1,197/km^{2} (3,100/sq mi)
  - Households: 10,317

Economy
  - Income class: 2nd municipal income class
  - Poverty incidence: 10.21% (2023)
  - Revenue: ₱ 228.1 million (2024)
  - Assets: ₱ 349.4 million (2024)
  - Expenditure: ₱ 98.86 million (2024)
  - Liabilities: ₱ 82.07 million (2024)

Service provider
  - Electricity: Manila Electric Company (Meralco)
- Time zone: UTC+8 (PST)
- ZIP code: 4119
- PSGC: 0402102000
- IDD : area code: +63 (0)46
- Native languages: Tagalog
- Website: www.amadeo.gov.ph

Amadeo, officially the Municipality of Amadeo (Tagalog: Bayan ng Amadeo), is a municipality in the province of Cavite, Philippines. According to the 2024 census, it has a population of 44,190 people.

== Etymology ==
The town got its name after King Amadeo I of Spain, the only Spanish king from the Italian House of Savoy. The town was previously known as Masilao (from Tagalog masilaw, "dazzling"), referenced to the glaring red flowers of the dapdap plant (Erythrina variegata) common in the area.

== History ==
Amadeo traces its origins to Masilaw, a barangay of Silang. It was established as an independent municipality on July 15, 1872, through the authority of Governor-General Rafael Izquierdo y Gutiérrez. The new town initially comprised eight barangays formerly under Silang: Halang, Pangil, Banaybanay, Bukal, Maitim, Minantok, Salaban, and Talon. During its first 21 years, revolutionaries referred to the town by the Tagalog name *Maypag-ibig* (“With Love”), in line with a broader movement to replace colonial-era place names with indigenous ones.

On October 15, 1903, it was returned to Silang by virtue of Act No. 947, as the Provincial Executive was displeased of how Amadeo was governed. It regained its independent status in January 1915 under Cavite Governor Antero Soriano. Previously composed of 13 barrios, 12 additional barangays, all in the poblacion, were established in 1972 by virtue of Presidential Decree No. 86. In 1985, Minantok was divided into two barangays, Minantok Silangan and Minantok Kanluran, following a plebiscite.

On February 15, 1989, Mayor Jeremias Villanueva and his security man Virgilio Lascano were assassinated by three gunmen riding a vehicle in front of his rented townhouse in Las Piñas, Metro Manila.

== Geography ==
=== Barangays ===
Amadeo is politically subdivided into 26 barangays, as indicated in the matrix below. Each barangay consists of puroks and some have sitios.

Currently, there are 12 barangays which are classified as urban.

PSGC	Barangay	Population			±% p.a.	
		2024		2010		
042102001	Banaybanay	5.6%	2,466	2,155	▴	0.94%
042102002	Bucal	2.8%	1,248	949	▴	1.93%
042102003	Dagatan	6.9%	3,029	2,031	▴	2.82%
042102004	Halang	5.0%	2,205	1,814	▴	1.37%
042102005	Loma	6.2%	2,728	1,816	▴	2.88%
042102007	Maitim I	7.3%	3,225	2,559	▴	1.62%
042102008	Maymangga	2.8%	1,230	1,012	▴	1.37%
042102009	Minantok Kanluran	2.4%	1,040	780	▴	2.02%
042102010	Pangil	23.2%	10,257	2,585	▴	10.08%
042102011	Barangay I (Pob.)	3.5%	1,551	1,392	▴	0.76%
042102012	Barangay X (Pob.)	0.8%	353	394	▾	−0.76%
042102013	Barangay XI (Pob.)	0.9%	417	435	▾	−0.29%
042102014	Barangay XII (Pob.)	3.6%	1,607	1,409	▴	0.92%
042102015	Barangay II (Pob.)	1.0%	462	557	▾	−1.29%
042102016	Barangay III (Pob.)	0.9%	394	450	▾	−0.92%
042102017	Barangay IV (Pob.)	2.2%	976	804	▴	1.36%
042102018	Barangay V (Pob.)	4.5%	1,977	1,513	▴	1.88%
042102019	Barangay VI (Pob.)	2.1%	908	826	▴	0.66%
042102020	Barangay VII (Pob.)	1.1%	482	523	▾	−0.57%
042102021	Barangay VIII (Pob.)	1.1%	472	481	▾	−0.13%
042102022	Barangay IX (Pob.)	1.3%	596	621	▾	−0.29%
042102023	Salaban	6.1%	2,706	1,919	▴	2.42%
042102024	Talon	8.6%	3,796	2,712	▴	2.37%
042102025	Tamacan	4.2%	1,865	1,590	▴	1.12%
042102026	Buho	3.9%	1,704	1,227	▴	2.31%
042102027	Minantok Silangan	2.3%	1,026	903	▴	0.89%
	Total		44,190	33,457	▴	1.96%

=== Climate ===
Climate data for Amadeo, Cavite
Month	Jan	Feb	Mar	Apr	May	Jun	Jul	Aug	Sep	Oct	Nov	Dec	Year
Mean daily maximum °C (°F)	26 (79)	28 (82)	29 (84)	31 (88)	30 (86)	28 (82)	27 (81)	26 (79)	26 (79)	27 (81)	27 (81)	26 (79)	28 (82)
Mean daily minimum °C (°F)	18 (64)	18 (64)	18 (64)	20 (68)	21 (70)	22 (72)	22 (72)	22 (72)	21 (70)	20 (68)	19 (66)	19 (66)	20 (68)
Average precipitation mm (inches)	10 (0.4)	10 (0.4)	12 (0.5)	27 (1.1)	94 (3.7)	153 (6.0)	206 (8.1)	190 (7.5)	179 (7.0)	120 (4.7)	54 (2.1)	39 (1.5)	1,094 (43)
Average rainy days	5.2	4.5	6.4	9.2	19.7	24.3	26.9	25.7	24.4	21.0	12.9	9.1	189.3
Source: Meteoblue

== Demographics ==
Population census of Amadeo
Year	Pop.	±% p.a.
1903	3,757	—
1918	5,455	+2.52%
1939	6,402	+0.77%
1948	7,960	+2.45%
1960	10,560	+2.38%
1970	13,030	+2.12%
1975	14,471	+2.13%
1980	16,234	+2.33%
1990	21,022	+2.62%
1995	22,728	+1.47%
2000	25,737	+2.70%
2007	31,705	+2.92%
2010	33,457	+1.98%
2015	37,649	+2.27%
2020	41,901	+2.28%
2024	44,190	+1.29%
Source: Philippine Statistics Authority

In the 2024 census, the population of Amadeo was 44,190 people, with a density of 1,200 inhabitants per square kilometer or 3,100 inhabitants per square mile.

== Economy ==
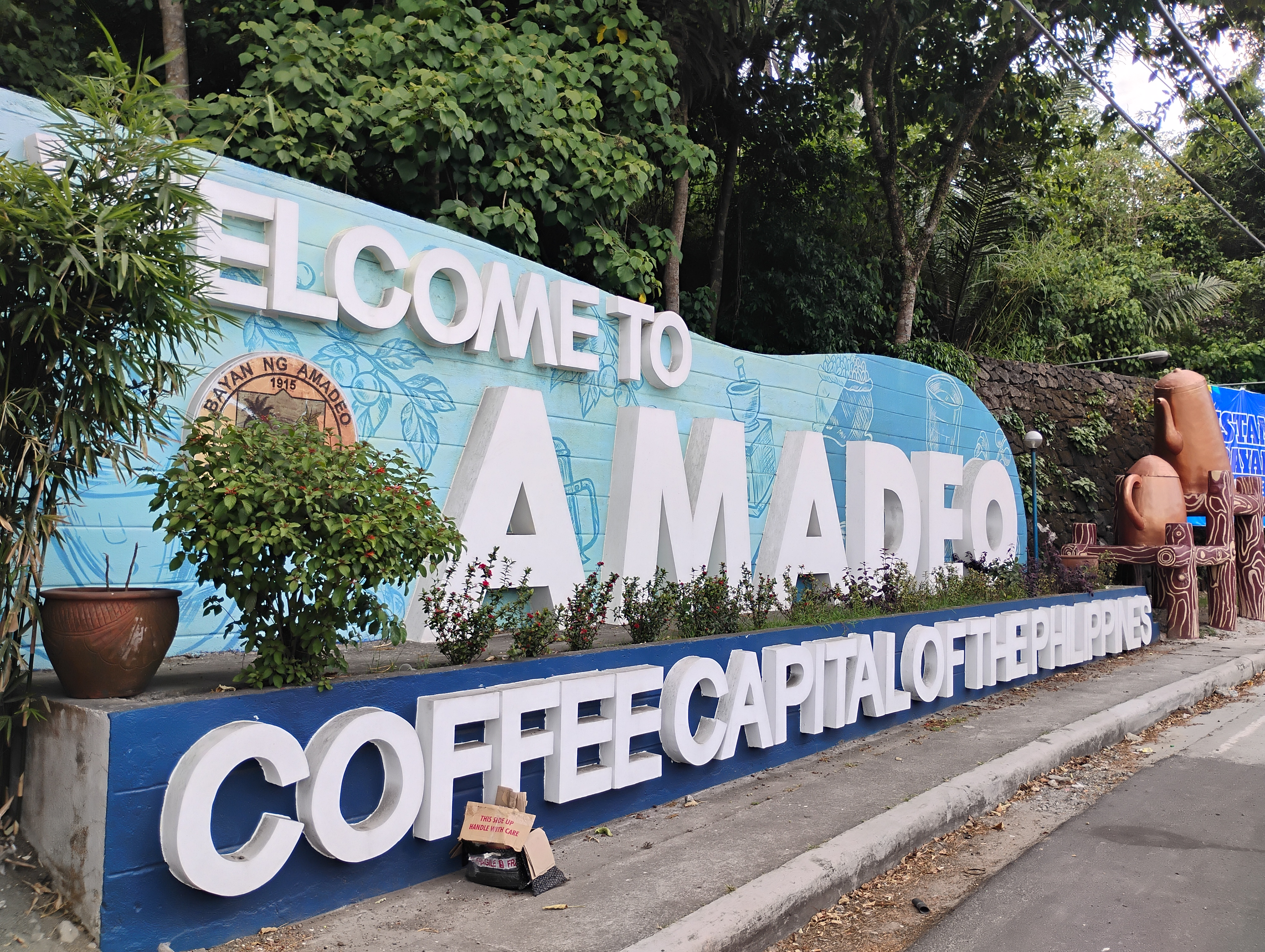
Amadeo as Coffee Capital of the Philippines Welcome Marker

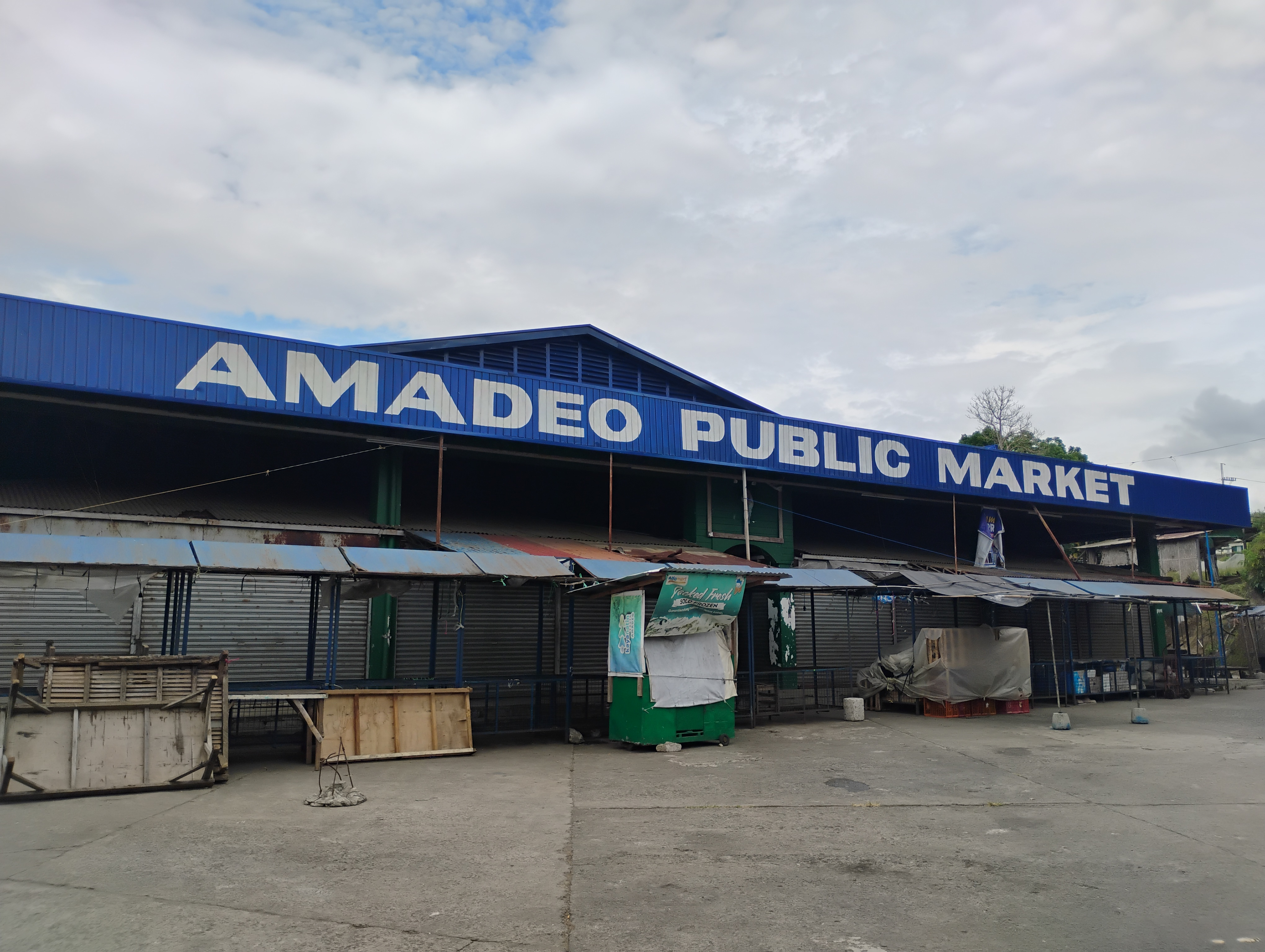
Amadeo Public Market

Poverty incidence of Amadeo

Source: Philippine Statistics Authority

Amadeo is renowned as the "Coffee Capital of the Philippines." Agriculture, especially coffee cultivation that started in the 1880s, plays a pivotal role in the town's economy. In 2022, Amadeo reported a revenue of ₱203.6 million.

== Culture ==
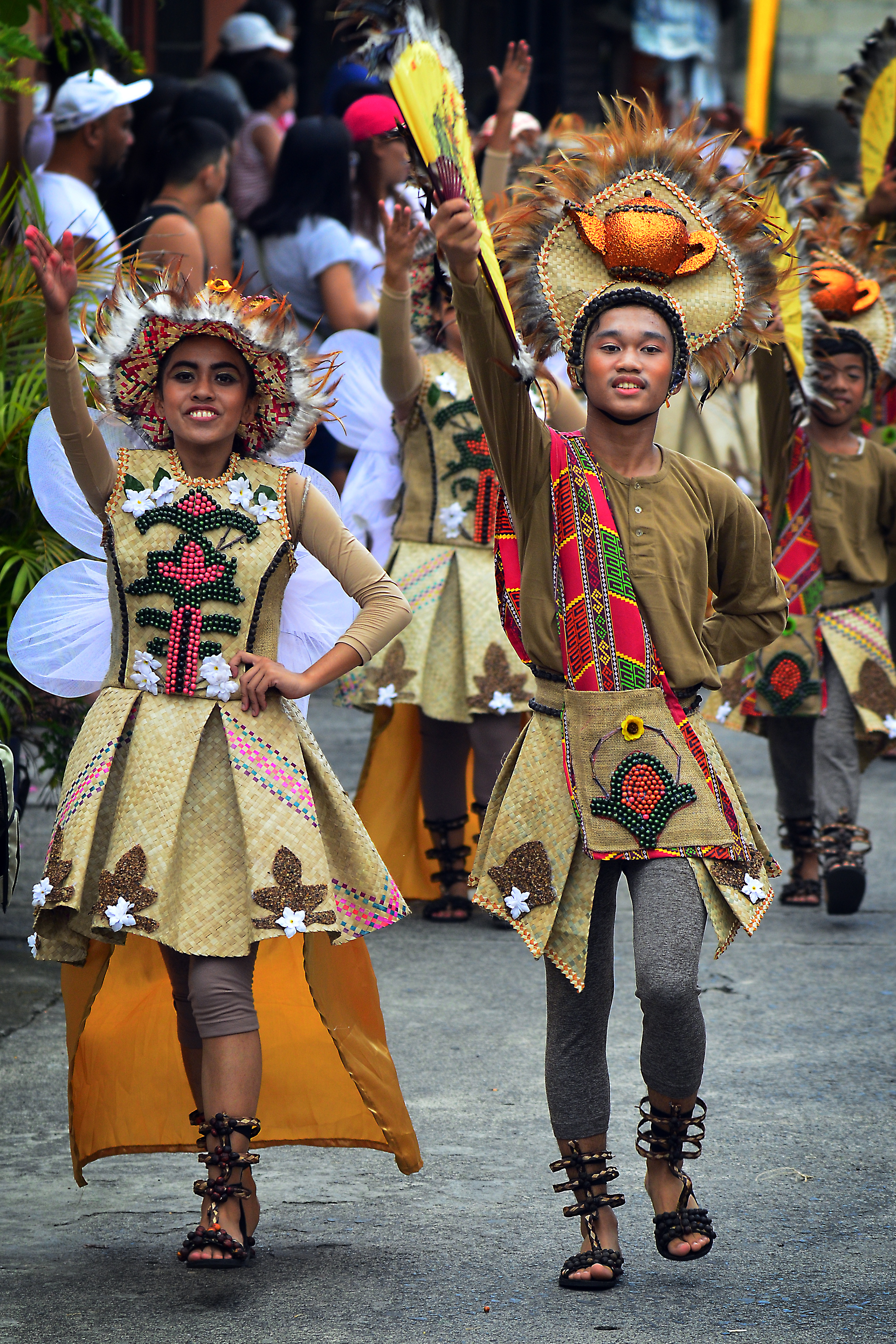
Pahimis Festival

Amadeo is best known for its Pahimis Festival, which showcases the town's coffee industry. It is usually held on the last weekend of February and its town fiesta is held on the last Sunday of April.

=== Primary and elementary schools ===
- Amadeo Elementary School
- Amadeo Weste Cavite Instituto de le Mar
- Brightways Academy
- Dagatan Elementary School
- Dorcas Samaritan Academe
- Escuela De Louis Alhanro
- Fr. Luigi Caburlotto School
- Halang Banaybanay Elementary School
- Loma Elementary School
- Maitim Elementary School
- Mariano C. Anacay Elementary School
- OBB Institute of Learning
- Pangil Elementary School
- Salaban Elementary School
- Scuola Maria Santissima
- St. Mary Magdalene Parochial School
- Sunstar Academy
- Talon Elementary School
- Tamakan Elementary School

=== Secondary schools ===
- Amadeo National High School
- Halang Banaybanay Integrated School
- Istituto Maria Immacolata
- Pangil National High School
- Talon Integrated School

=== Higher educational institutions ===
- Jesus Reigns Christian College

== Notable personalities ==
- Elle Villanueva - actress
