= Cavite Provincial Board =

Legislative body of the province of Cavite, Philippines

Cavite Provincial Board Sangguniang Panlalawigan ng Cavite

Type
- Type: Unicameral
- Term limits: 3 terms (9 years)

Leadership
- Presiding Officer: Ramon Vicente H. Bautista, Lakas-CMD

Structure
- Seats: 19 board members 1 ex officio presiding officer
- Political groups: NUP (10) Lakas–CMD (5) NPC (1) Vacant (1) Non-partisan (2)
- Length of term: 3 years
- Authority: Local Government Code of the Philippines

Elections
- Voting system: Multiple non-transferable vote (regular members); Indirect election (ex officio members)
- Last election: May 12, 2025
- Next election: May 8, 2028

Meeting place
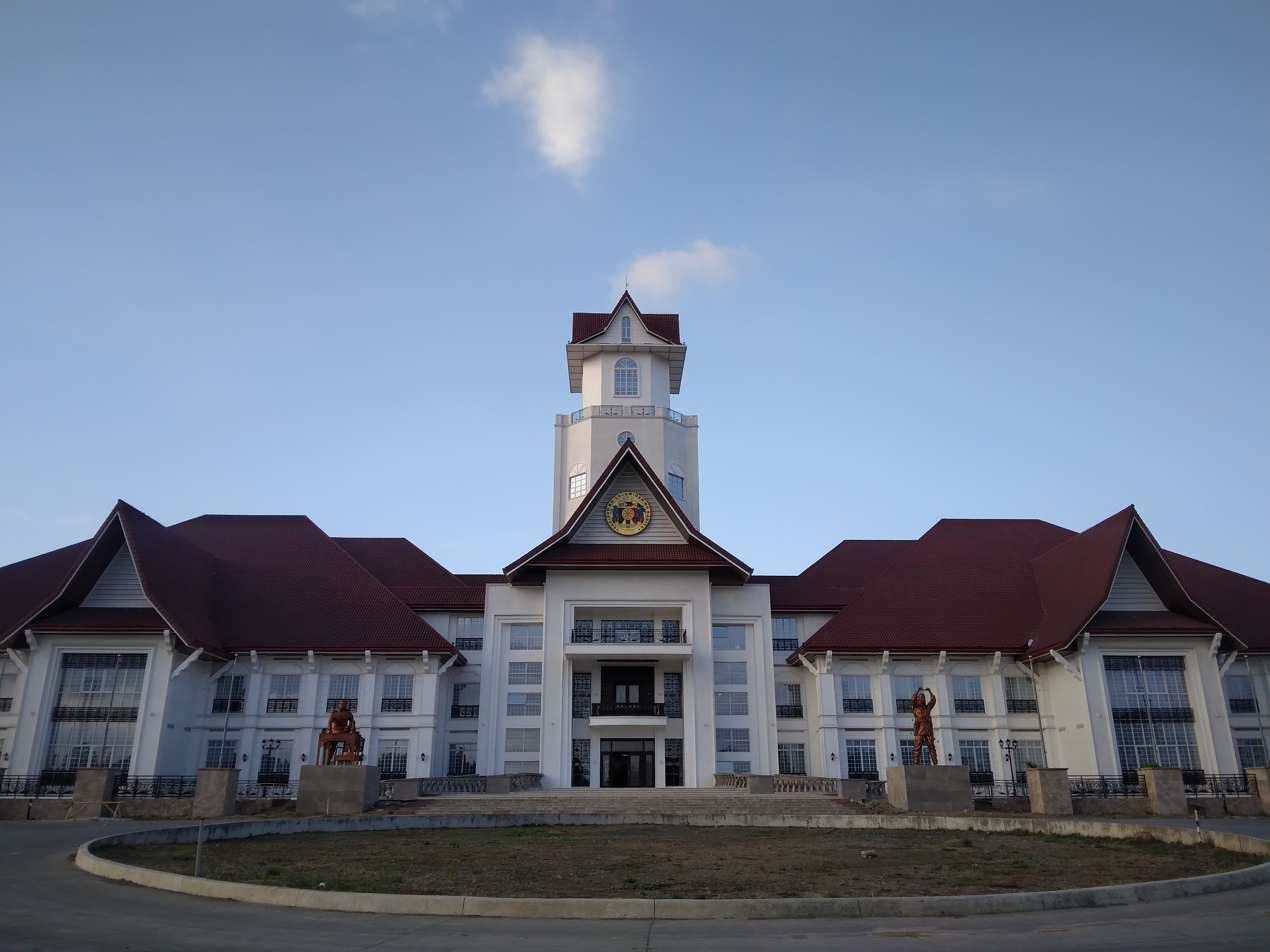
- New Provincial Capitol, Trece Martires City, Cavite, Philippines

Website
- Cavite Provincial Board Official Website

The Cavite Provincial Board is the Sangguniang Panlalawigan (provincial legislature) of the Philippine province of Cavite.

The members are elected via plurality-at-large voting: the province is divided into eight districts, two representatives in each district. The candidates with the highest number of votes in each district, depending on the number of members the district sends, are elected. The vice governor is the ex officio presiding officer, and only votes to break ties. The vice governor is elected via the plurality voting system province-wide.

The districts used in appropriation of members is coextensive with the legislative districts of Cavite.

Aside from the regular members, the board also includes the provincial federation presidents of the Liga ng mga Barangay (ABC, from its old name "Association of Barangay Captains"), the Sangguniang Kabataan (SK, youth councils) and the Philippine Councilors League (PCL).

== District apportionment ==
Elections	No. of seats per district								Ex officio seats	Total seats
Elections	1st	2nd	3rd	4th	5th	6th	7th	8th	Ex officio seats	Total seats
1987–2010	3	4	3	–	–	–	–	–	3	13
2010–2019	2	2	2	2	2	2	2	–	3	17
2019–present	2	2	2	2	2	2	2	2	3	19

== List of members ==
=== Current members ===
These are the members after the 2022 local elections and 2023 barangay and SK elections:

- Vice Governor: Ramon Vicente H. Bautista (Lakas-CMD)

Seat	Board member	Party	Start of term	End of term
1st district	Juan Ysmael R. Gandia	Lakas	June 30, 2025	June 30, 2028
1st district	Romel Enriquez	Lakas	June 30, 2019	June 30, 2028
2nd district	Alde Joselito F. Pagulayan	Lakas	June 30, 2025	June 30, 2028
2nd district	Edwin Malvar	Lakas	June 30, 2019	June 30, 2028
3rd district	Arnel M. Cantimbuhan	NUP	June 30, 2022	June 30, 2028
3rd district	Lloyd Emman D. Jaro	NUP	June 30, 2025	June 30, 2028
4th district	Nickanor N. Austria Jr.	NUP	June 30, 2022	June 30, 2028
4th district	Joy G. Dela Cuesta	NUP	September, 2026	June 30, 2028
5th district	Aidel Paul Belamide	NUP	June 30, 2022	June 30, 2028
5th district	Ivee Jayne A. Reyes	NUP	June 30, 2025	June 30, 2028
6th district	Maurito Sison	NUP	June 30, 2022	June 30, 2028
6th district	Kerby Salazar	NUP	June 30, 2019	June 30, 2028
7th district	Camille del Rosario	NUP	June 30, 2025	June 30, 2028
7th district	Jhon Kester Aldrin Anacan	NUP	June 30, 2025	June 30, 2028
8th district	Jasmin Angelli M. Bautista	NPC	June 30, 2025	June 30, 2028
8th district	Eimeren M. Nazareno	NUP	June 30, 2025	June 30, 2028
ABC	Rafael Paterno III	Nonpartisan	January 15, 2024	January 1, 2026
PCL	Edward R. Samala Jr.	Lakas	August 29, 2025	June 30, 2025
SK	Chelsea Jillian Sarno	Nonpartisan	November 28, 2023	January 1, 2026

=== Vice Governor ===
Election year	Name	Party	Ref.
1995	Bong Revilla	Lakas	
1998	Jonvic Remulla	Lakas	
2001	Jonvic Remulla	LDP	
2004	Jonvic Remulla	LDP	
2007	Dencito Campaña	Liberal	
2010	Recto Cantimbuhan	Liberal	
2013	Jolo Revilla	Lakas	
2016	Jolo Revilla	Lakas	
2019	Jolo Revilla	NPC	
2022	Athena Tolentino (until 2024)	NUP	
2022	Shernan Jaro (since 2024)	NUP	
2025	Ramon Vicente H. Bautista	Lakas	

=== 1st District ===
- City: Cavite City
- Municipalities: Kawit, Noveleta, Rosario
- Population (2020): 368,468

Election year	Member (party)	Member (party)	Ref.
2010	Dino Carlo R. Chua (Lakas–CMD)	Ryan R. Enriquez (Lakas–CMD)	
2013	Dino Carlo R. Chua (Lakas–CMD)	Ryan R. Enriquez (Lakas–CMD)	
2016	Ryan R. Enriquez (UNA)	Gilbert V. Gandia (UNA)	
2019	Davey Christian R. Chua (Nacionalista)	Romel R. Enriquez (Nacionalista)	
2022	Davey Christian R. Chua (Lakas–CMD)	Romel R. Enriquez (NUP)	
2025	Romel R. Enriquez (Lakas–CMD)	Juan Ysmael R. Gandia (Lakas–CMD)	

=== 2nd District ===
- City: Bacoor
- Population (2020): 664,625

Election year	Member (party)	Member (party)	Ref.
2010	Rolando S. Remulla (Lakas–CMD)	Edwin E. Malvar (Liberal)	
2013	Edralin G. Gawaran (Lakas–CMD)	Rolando S. Remulla (Lakas–CMD)	
2016	Edralin G. Gawaran (Lakas–CMD)	Reynaldo M. Fabian (Lakas–CMD)	
2019	Edralin G. Gawaran (NPC)	Edwin E. Malvar (Liberal)	
2022	Ramon Vicente Revilla (Lakas–CMD)	Edwin E Malvar (Lakas–CMD)	
2025	Edwin E. Malvar (Lakas–CMD)	Alde Joselito F. Pagulayan (Lakas–CMD)	

=== 3rd District ===
- City: Imus
- Population (2020): 496,794

Election year	Member (party)	Member (party)	Ref.
2010	Larry Boy S. Nato (Liberal)	Rodrigo P. Arguelles (Liberal)	
2013	Larry Boy S. Nato (Liberal)	Arnel M. Catimbuhan (Liberal)	
2016	Larry Boy S. Nato (Liberal)	Homer T. Saquilayan (Nacionalista)	
2019	Jeffrey V. Asistio (PDP–Laban)	Dennis T. Lacson (PDP–Laban)	
2022	Shernan Jaro (NUP)	Arnel Cantimbuhan (NUP)	
2025	Lloyd Emman D. Jaro (NUP)	Arnel Cantimbuhan (NUP)	

=== 4th District ===
- City: Dasmariñas
- Population (2020): 703,141

Election year	Member (party)	Member (party)	Ref.
2013	Teofilo B. Lara (NUP)	Rex Mangubat (NUP)	
2016	Teofilo B. Lara (NUP)	Valeriano S. Encabo (NUP)	
2019	Fulgencio C. dela Cuesta Jr. (NUP)	Valeriano S. Encabo (NUP)	
2022	Nickanor N. Austria Jr. (NUP)	Fulgencio dela Cuesta Jr. (NUP) (until October 28, 2025)	
2025	Nickanor N. Austria Jr. (NUP)	Fulgencio dela Cuesta Jr. (NUP) (until October 28, 2025)	
2026	Nickanor N. Austria Jr. (NUP)	Joy G. Dela Cuesta	

=== 5th District ===
- City: Carmona
- Municipalities General Mariano Alvarez, Silang
- Population (2020): 574,333

Election year	Member (party)	Member (party)	Ref.
2010	Aristides Jose A. Velazco (Independent)	Marcos C. Amutan (Lakas–CMD)	
2013	Ivee Jayne A. Reyes (Lakas–CMD)	Marcos C. Amutan (Lakas–CMD)	
2016	Ivee Jayne A. Reyes (UNA)	Marcos C. Amutan (UNA)	
2019	Ivee Jayne A. Reyes (Nacionalista)	Alston Kevin A. Anarna (Independent)	
2022	Aidel Paul Belamide (NPC)	Marcos C. Amutan (NUP)	
2022	Aidel Paul Belamide (NPC)	Paolo Crisostomo (Lakas) (Note: Proclaimed by Comelec Special Provincial Board of Canvassers as the winning candidate in September 2023.)	
2025	Aidel Paul Belarmide (NUP)	Ivee Jayne A. Reyes (NUP)	

=== 6th District ===
==== 2013–2019 ====
- City: Trece Martires
- Municipalities: Amadeo, General Trias (became city 2015), Tanza

Election year	Member (party)	Member (party)	Ref.
2010	Hermogenes C. Arayata III (Liberal)	Albert G. Ambagan Jr. (Independent)	
2013	Hermogenes C. Arayata III (Liberal)	Felix A. Grepo (Lakas–CMD)	
2016 (Note: Republic Act No. 11069, approved on September 14, 2018, reapportioning the province of Cavite into eight legislative districts to make General Trias the province's sixth legislative district.)	Raymundo A. del Rosario (UNA)	Felix A. Grepo (NUP)	

==== 2019–present ====
- City: General Trias
- Population (2020): 450,583

Election year	Member (party)	Member (party)	Ref.
2019	Felix A. Grepo (NUP)	Kerby J. Salazar (KANP)	
2022	Maurito Sison (NUP)	Kerby J. Salazar (NUP) (Note: Kerby Salazar is concurrently a member of Katipunan ng Nagkakaisang Pilipino and ran under National Unity Party in 2022.)	
2025	Maurito Sison (NUP)	Kerby J. Salazar (NUP)	

=== 7th District ===
==== 2013–2019 ====
- City: Tagaytay
- Municipalities: Alfonso, General Emilio Aguinaldo, Indang, Magallanes, Maragondon, Mendez, Naic, Ternate

Election year	Member (party)	Member (party)	Ref.
2010	Irene P. Bencito (Nacionalista)	Virgilio T. Ambion (Independent)	
2013	Irene P. Bencito (Nacionalista)	Eireen R. Beratio-Cocos (Liberal)	
2016	Reyniel A. Ambion (Liberal)	Reinalyne V. Varias (UNA)	

==== 2019–present ====
- City: Trece Martires
- Municipalities: Amadeo, Indang, Tanza
- Population (2020): 633,219

Election year	Member (party)	Member (party)	Ref.
2019	Angelito H. Langit (Nacionalista)	Crispin Diego D. Remulla (Nacionalista)	
2022	Raymundo del Rosario (NUP)	Crispin Diego D. Remulla (NUP) (Note: Resigned on election as representative of Cavite's 7th district in February 2023.)	
2022	Raymundo del Rosario (NUP)	Francisco Gabriel D. Remulla (NUP) (Note: Designated as board member on March 16, 2023, to finish Crispin Diego Remulla's term.)	
2025	Camille del Rosario (NUP)	Jhon Kester Aldrin Anacan (NUP)	

=== 8th District ===
- City: Tagaytay
- Municipalities: Alfonso, General Emilio Aguinaldo, Magallanes, Maragondon, Mendez, Naic, Ternate
- Population (2020): 453,666

Election year	Member (party)	Member (party)	Ref.
2019	Reyniel A. Ambion (PDP–Laban)	Virgilio P. Varias (PDP–Laban)	
2022	Reyniel A. Ambion (NUP)	Irene Bencito (UNA)	
2025	Jasmin Angelli M. Bautista (NPC)	Eimeren M. Nazareno (NUP)	

=== Philippine Councilors League President ===
Election year	Member (city/municipality) (party)
2013	Armando V. Bernal (Kawit) (UNA)
2016	Kerby J. Salazar (General Trias) (NUP)
2019	Benzen Raleigh G. Rusit (Cavite City) (Partido Magdalo)
2019	Nickanor N. Austria Jr. (Dasmariñas) (NUP)
2022	Anne Jomille D. Humarang (Trece Martires) (NUP) (interim)
2022	Kiko Barzaga (Dasmariñas) (NUP)
2025	Edward R. Samala Jr. (Kawit) (Lakas)

=== Liga ng mga Barangay President ===
Election year	Member (city/municipality)
2013	Conrado A. Viado (Amadeo)
2016	Francisco Paolo P. Crisostomo (Silang)
2018	Francisco Paolo P. Crisostomo (Silang)
2023	Rafael Paterno III (Bacoor)

=== SK Provincial Federation President ===
Election year	Member (city/municipality)
2018	Jerome Napoleon T. Gonzales (Dasmariñas)
2022	Frederick Magallanes (Maragondon)
2023	Tom Carlo Ardemer (Carmona)
2023	Chelsea Jillian Sarno (Imus)
