= 2022 Cavite local elections =

Part of the 2022 Philippine general election

2022 Cavite gubernatorial election
- May 9, 2022
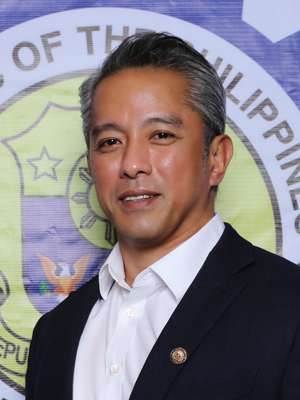
		IND
Nominee	Jonvic Remulla	Weng Aguinaldo
Party	NUP	Independent
Running mate	Athena Tolentino
Popular vote	1,368,199	122,590
Percentage	84.67	7.59
Governor before election
Jonvic Remulla
NUP
Elected Governor
Jonvic Remulla
NUP

Local elections were held in the province of Cavite on Monday, May 9, 2022, as part of the 2022 Philippine general election. Voters will select candidates for all local positions: a municipal and city mayor, vice mayor and councilors, as well as members of the Sangguniang Panlalawigan, the governor, vice governor and representatives for the eight districts of Cavite.

== Background ==
Incumbent Jonvic Remulla who was elected in 2019 is seeking a second term as governor of Cavite. Incumbent Tagaytay Councilor Athena Tolentino, daughter of incumbent Cavite 8th district representative Abraham Tolentino and Tagaytay Mayor Agnes Tolentino is being poised by Remulla to be his running mate. The 23-year old Tolentino said that being a woman and a young politician is her advantage in running for Vice Governor. If elected, she will be the first female Vice Governor of the province. Meanwhile, incumbent vice governor Jolo Revilla was elected for a third consecutive term in 2019 and is running as representative of the 1st district of Cavite.

== Provincial elections ==
=== Governor ===
Incumbent Jonvic Remulla is running for his second term.

Cavite gubernatorial election
Party	Candidate	Votes	%
NUP	Juanito Victor Remulla, Jr.	1,368,199	84.67
Independent	Weng Aguinaldo	122,590	7.59
Independent	Augusto Pera, Jr.	98,848	6.12
Independent	Jerum Gilles	26,228	1.62
Total votes		1,615,865	100%
NUP hold			

==== Per City/Municipality ====
City/Municipality	Jonvic Remulla		Weng Aguinaldo		Augusto Pera Jr.		Jerum Gilles	
City/Municipality	Votes	%	Votes	%	Votes	%	Votes	%
Alfonso	24,728	91.61	926	3.43	1,087	4.03	253	0.94
Amadeo	18,957	89.57	936	4.42	1,069	5.05	202	0.95
Bacoor	164,321	83.20	18,793	9.52	10,471	5.30	3,921	1.99
Carmona	38,339	89.68	2,330	5.45	1,461	3.42	620	1.45
Cavite City	42,079	86.68	3,039	6.26	2,906	5.99	521	1.07
Dasmariñas	258,795	86.70	18,871	6.32	15,942	5.34	4,893	1.64
General Emilio Aguinaldo	11,347	94.11	342	2.84	285	2.36	83	0.69
General Mariano Alvarez	62,314	89.35	3,075	4.41	3,372	4.83	984	1.41
General Trias	99,548	80.99	11,779	9.58	9,047	7.36	2,541	2.07
Imus	131,019	80.65	16,747	10.31	11,859	7.30	2,819	1.74
Indang	28,406	87.31	1,759	5.41	2,018	6.20	353	1.08
Kawit	32,731	77.97	5,648	13.45	2,670	6.36	932	2.22
Magallanes	10,839	94.33	269	2.34	281	2.45	102	0.89
Maragondon	20,278	86.56	1,369	5.84	1,484	6.33	295	1.26
Mendez	15,726	90.95	584	3.38	845	4.89	136	0.79
Naic	51,486	82.68	4,783	7.68	4,897	7.86	1,103	1.77
Noveleta	18,638	82.11	2,038	8.98	1,740	7.67	284	1.25
Rosario	45,286	81.40	5,977	10.74	3,235	5.81	1,135	2.04
Silang	94,095	86.66	5,137	4.73	7,729	7.12	1,619	1.49
Tagaytay	34,111	93.03	1,141	3.11	1,059	2.89	357	0.97
Tanza	87,013	80.94	11,238	10.45	7,586	7.06	1,672	1.56
Ternate	10,620	87.88	741	6.13	524	4.34	199	1.65
Trece Martires	67,523	83.28	5,068	6.25	7,281	8.98	1,204	1.49
TOTAL	1,368,199	84.67	122,590	7.59	98,848	6.12	26,228	1.62

=== Vice Governor ===
Incumbent Jolo Revilla is term-limited and is running for representative of the 1st District of Cavite. Incumbent Tagaytay City councilor Athena Bryana Tolentino, daughter of incumbent congressman Abraham Tolentino, is the party's nominee.

Cavite vice gubernatorial election
Party	Candidate	Votes	%
NUP	Athena Bryana Tolentino	1,196,235	85.37
Independent	Joseph Thim Jamboy	205,037	14.63
Total votes		1,401,272	100%
NUP gain from Lakas			

==== Per City/Municipality ====
City/Municipality	Athena Bryana Tolentino		Joseph Thim Jamboy	
City/Municipality	Votes	%	Votes	%
Alfonso	22,284	90.50	2,339	9.50
Amadeo	17,633	91.08	1,727	8.92
Bacoor	137,374	81.76	30,657	18.24
Carmona	33,282	89.07	4,086	10.93
Cavite City	36,271	88.20	4,852	11.80
Dasmariñas	214,511	83.07	43,706	16.93
General Emilio Aguinaldo	10,655	94.37	636	5.63
General Mariano Alvarez	52,564	87.87	7,257	12.13
General Trias	88,305	82.52	18,709	17.48
Imus	113,257	81.20	26,223	18.80
Indang	24,803	89.17	3,013	10.83
Kawit	29,239	81.90	6,463	18.10
Magallanes	10,196	95.29	504	4.71
Maragondon	19,874	92.44	1,656	7.56
Mendez	14,994	89.48	1,762	10.52
Naic	48,944	89.00	6,049	11.00
Noveleta	16,925	86.90	2,552	13.10
Rosario	38,405	83.58	7,545	16.42
Silang	89,006	90.34	9,513	9.66
Tagaytay	37,075	95.85	1,606	4.15
Tanza	69,571	82.07	15,202	17.93
Ternate	10,938	94.03	694	5.97
Trece Martires	60,129	87.85	8,316	12.15
TOTAL	1,196,235	85.37	205,037	14.63

=== Provincial Board elections ===
Party	Votes	%	Seats
National Unity Party	1,383,127	59.16	11
Lakas–CMD	471,124	20.15	3
Nationalist People's Coalition	114,100	4.88	1
United Nationalist Alliance	68,191	2.92	1
Liberal Party	57,734	2.47	–
Progressive Movement for the Devolution of Initiatives	34,952	1.49	–
Philippine Green Republican Party	31,233	1.34	–
Pederalismo ng Dugong Dakilang Samahan	29,325	1.25	–
Independent	148,175	6.34	–
Ex officio seats			3
Total	2,337,961	100.00	19

==== 1st District ====
2022 Provincial Board Election in 1st District of Cavite
Party	Candidate	Votes	%
Lakas	Davey Christian Chua	119,551	43.12
NUP	Romel Enriquez	64,819	23.38
Liberal	Conrad Abutin	57,734	20.83
Independent	Derlyn Maceda	27,656	9.98
NPC	William Narvaez	7,474	2.69
Total votes		277,234	100%

==== 2nd District ====
2022 Provincial Board Election in 2nd District of Cavite
Party	Candidate	Votes	%
Lakas	Ramon Vicente "Ramboy" Revilla	143,097	52.99
Lakas	Edwin Malvar	126,923	47.01
Total votes		270,020	100%

==== 3rd District ====
2022 Provincial Board Election in 3rd District of Cavite
Party	Candidate	Votes	%
NUP	Shernan Jaro	113,172	46.92
NUP	Ony Cantimbuhan	113,094	46.89
Independent	Lucius Minaldo	14,919	6.19
Total votes		241,185	100%

==== 4th District ====
2022 Provincial Board Election in 4th District of Cavite
Party	Candidate	Votes	%
NUP	Nickol Austria	186,261	45.48
NUP	Fulgencio "Jun" Dela Cuesta, Jr.	165,590	40.43
PGRP	Delia Gajo	31,233	7.63
Independent	Joel Musa	26,496	6.47
Total votes		409,580	100%

==== 5th District ====
2022 Provincial Board Election in 5th District of Cavite
Party	Candidate	Votes	%
NPC	Aidel Paul Belamide	106,626	28.97
NUP	Macoy Amutan	95,972	26.07
Lakas	Paolo Crisostomo	81,553	22.16
PROMDI	Gerardo Anarna	34,952	9.50
PDDS	Paolo Poblete	29,325	7.97
Independent	Dante Alumia	19,643	5.34
Total votes		368,071	100

==== 6th District ====
2022 Provincial Board Election in 6th District of Cavite
Party	Candidate	Votes	%
NUP	Maurito Sison	87,456	50.15
NUP	Kerby Salazar	86,924	49.85
Total votes		174,380	100%

==== 7th District ====
2022 Provincial Board Election in 7th District of Cavite
Party	Candidate	Votes	%
NUP	Crispin Diego Remulla	154,515	43.94
NUP	Raymundo Del Rosario	137,706	39.16
Independent	John Mark Cayao	44,677	12.7
Independent	Jualinio Abutin	14,784	4.2
Total votes		351,682	100%

==== 8th District ====
2022 Provincial Board Election in 8th District of Cavite
Party	Candidate	Votes	%
NUP	Rainier Ambion	114,362	46.52
UNA	Irene Bencito	68,191	27.74
NUP	Reynaldo Rillo	63,256	25.73
Total votes		245,809	100%

== Congressional elections ==
=== 1st District (Northern Cavite) ===
Incumbent Francis Gerald Abaya is term-limited and is running for mayor of Kawit. His brother, former Kawit Vice Mayor Paul Abaya is his party's nominee. His opponent is incumbent Vice Governor Jolo Revilla.

2022 Philippine House of Representatives election in Cavite's 1st congressional district
Party	Candidate	Votes	%
Lakas	Jolo Revilla	101,809	52.33
Liberal	Paul Abaya	92,761	47.67
Total votes		194,570	100%
Lakas gain from Liberal			

=== 2nd District (Bacoor) ===
Incumbent Strike Revilla is running for Mayor of Bacoor, switching places with his sister-in-law, incumbent mayor Lani Mercado-Revilla.

2022 Philippine House of Representatives election in Cavite's 2nd congressional district
Party	Candidate	Votes	%
Lakas	Lani Mercado-Revilla	168,385	86.05
Independent	Jose Herminio Japson	18,142	9.27
Independent	George Abraham Ber Ado	9,158	4.68
Total votes		195,685	100%
Lakas hold			

=== 3rd District (Imus) ===
Incumbent Alex Advincula is term-limited and is running for Mayor of Imus. His son, incumbent councilor AJ Advincula is running in his place.

2022 Philippine House of Representatives election in Cavite's 3rd congressional district
Party	Candidate	Votes	%
NUP	AJ Advincula	154,292	100.00
Total votes		154,292	100%
NUP hold			

=== 4th District (Dasmariñas) ===
Incumbent Elpidio Barzaga Jr. is running for reelection.

2022 Philippine House of Representatives election in Cavite's 4th congressional district
Party	Candidate	Votes	%
NUP	Elpidio Barzaga Jr.	278,386	89.86
Independent	Osmundo Calupad	31,421	10.14
Total votes		309,807	100%
NUP hold			

=== 5th District (CarSiGMA District) ===
Incumbent Dahlia Loyola is running for Mayor of Carmona, switching places with her husband, incumbent Mayor Roy Loyola.

2022 Philippine House of Representatives election in Cavite's 5th congressional district
Party	Candidate	Votes	%
NPC	Roy Loyola	201,418	91.57
PFP	Rhenan de Castro	18,540	8.43
Total votes		219,958	100%
NPC hold			

=== 6th District (General Trias) ===
Incumbent Luis Ferrer IV is term-limited and is running for Mayor of General Trias, switching places with his brother, incumbent Mayor Antonio Ferrer.

2022 Philippine House of Representatives election in Cavite's 6th congressional district
Party	Candidate	Votes	%
NUP	Antonio Ferrer	118,371	100.00
Total votes		118,371	100%
NUP hold			

=== 7th District (Central Cavite) ===
Incumbent Jesus Crispin Remulla is running for reelection.

2022 Philippine House of Representatives election in Cavite's 7th congressional district
Party	Candidate	Votes	%
NUP	Jesus Crispin Remulla	202,784	100.00
Total votes		202,784	100%
NUP hold			

=== 8th District (Southwest Cavite) ===
Incumbent Abraham Tolentino is term-limited and is running for Mayor of Tagaytay, switching places with his wife, incumbent Mayor Agnes Tolentino. Mayor Tolentino was substituted by her daughter Aniela Tolentino to run for Congress.

2022 Philippine House of Representatives election in Cavite's 8th congressional district
Party	Candidate	Votes	%
NUP	Aniela Tolentino	166,077	89.74
Independent	Allan Par	18,995	10.26
Total votes		185,072	100%
NUP hold			

== City and municipal elections ==
=== 1st District ===
==== Cavite City ====
Incumbent Mayor Bernardo Paredes is term-limited and is no longer running for any position due to age and health. His coalition nominated his daughter, incumbent city Liga ng mga Barangay president and ex-officio city councilor Apple Paredes. She will be opposed by incumbent vice mayor Denver Chua, incidentally her former brother-in-law.

Cavite City Mayoralty Election
Party	Candidate	Votes	%
Lakas	Denver Chua	31,817	56.42
NUP	Apple Paredes	24,240	42.99
Independent	Reynaldo Trajano	253	0.45
Independent	Ramon Tirad	79	0.14
Total votes		56,389	100%

Incumbent Vice Mayor Denver Chua is running for mayor, hence the position will be an open one. His coalition nominated incumbent city councilor Raleigh Rusit, who will be opposed by another incumbent councilor, former vice mayor Percilito "Penchie" Consigo, who is coveting his old post.

Cavite City Vice Mayoralty Election
Party	Candidate	Votes	%
Lakas	Raleigh Rusit	31,317	57.85
NUP	Penchie Consigo	22,820	42.15
Total votes		54,137	100%

The Paredes-Consigo tandem and their team are notably supported by local supporters of the Lacson-Sotto campaign and that of Robredo-Pangilinan, as well as congressional candidate Paul Abaya.

==== Kawit ====
Kawit Mayoralty Election
Party	Candidate	Votes	%
Lakas	Angelo Emilio Aguinaldo	25,647	53.24
Liberal	Francis Gerald Abaya	22,619	46.76
Total votes		48,266	100%

Kawit Vice Mayoralty Election
Party	Candidate	Votes	%
Lakas	Junbie Samala	24,229	53.24
NUP	Arman Bernal	21,280	46.76
Total votes		45,509	100%

==== Noveleta ====
Noveleta Mayoralty Election
Party	Candidate	Votes	%
UNA	Dino Reyes Chua	19,260	74.32
NUP	Enrico Alvarez	6,656	25.68
Total votes		25,916	100%

Noveleta Vice Mayoralty Election
Party	Candidate	Votes	%
Aksyon	Arlynn Torres	19,219	100.00
Total votes		19,219	100%

==== Rosario ====
Rosario Mayoralty Election
Party	Candidate	Votes	%
Lakas	Voltaire Ricafrente	51,759	79.33
NUP	Mao Luna	13,485	20.67
Total votes		65,244	100

Rosario Vice Mayoralty Election
Party	Candidate	Votes	%
Lakas	Bamm Gonzales	42,938	69.35
NUP	Jun Badidles	18,973	30.65
Total votes		61,911	100

=== 2nd District ===
==== Bacoor ====
Incumbent Mayor Lani Mercado-Revilla is running for congresswoman, switching places with her brother-in-law, incumbent congressman Strike Revilla. Both are currently in their second terms.

Bacoor Mayoralty Election
Party	Candidate	Votes	%
Nacionalista	Strike Revilla	178,388	88.68
Independent	Jose Francisco	22,767	11.32
Total votes		201,155	100

Incumbent Vice Mayor Karen Sarino-Evaristo is term-limited and is running for Bacoor West district councilor. Her coalition nominated incumbent and three-term Bacoor West District councilor and one-time Imus municipal councilor in the 1990s Rowena Bautista-Mendiola, a sister of Strike and Senator Bong Revilla and Antipolo mayor Andrea Bautista-Ynares.

Bacoor Vice Mayoralty Election
Party	Candidate	Votes	%
NPC	Rowena Mortel Bautista-Mendiola	154,179	82.70
Independent	Meliza Sison Cubinar	32,263	17.30
Total votes		186,442	100

=== 3rd District ===
==== Imus City ====
Incumbent Mayor Emmanuel "Manny" Maliksi is term-limited. He was initially floated to be the candidate of the Liberal Party-led Team One Imus (since dissolved) for the congressional post of the city's lone district, but gave way to Adrian Advincula of Team AJAA in the regular district congressional race following their unification talks brokered by Senator Panfilo Lacson. Maliksi will instead be running as the first nominee of Buklod Filipino Party-List. As a result, both groups will be fielding term-limited district Representative Alex Advincula as their common mayoralty candidate.

Advincula will be opposed by Anthony Astillero, his perennial opponent since their past congressional matches.

Imus City Mayoralty Election
Party	Candidate	Votes	%
NUP	Alex "AA" Advincula	153,130	90.57
PRP	Anthony Astillero	15,942	9.43
Total votes		169,072	100

Incumbent Vice Mayor Arnel "Ony" Cantimbuhan is on his second term and was initially floated to be Team One Imus' mayoralty bet, but with the unification of Team One Imus and Team AJAA, he had to ditch the plan and will instead seek to reclaim his old post of provincial board member representing the province's third district. Both groups have endorsed former municipal mayor and vice mayor Homer "Saki" Saquilayan as their common vice mayoralty candidate.

Imus City Vice Mayoralty Election
Party	Candidate	Votes	%
NUP	Homer Saquilayan	140,443	87.46
Independent	Mike Lim	20,138	12.54
Total votes		160,581	100

=== 4th District ===
==== Dasmariñas ====
Dasmariñas mayoralty election
Party	Candidate	Votes	%
NUP	Jennifer Barzaga	261,047	83.74
Independent	Nelson Remulla	50,700	16.26
Total votes		311,747	100

Incumbent vice mayor Rex Mangubat will be challenged by his predecessor, incumbent senior provincial board member Valeriano Encabo. They used to be partymates under the National Unity Party until recently.

Dasmariñas vice mayoralty election
Party	Candidate	Votes	%
Independent	Valeriano Encabo	121,704	40.08
NUP	Raul Rex Mangubat	139,320	45.88
Independent	Teodorico Remulla	42,625	14.04
Total votes		303,679	100

=== 5th District ===
==== Carmona ====
Incumbent Roy Loyola is running for congressman, switching places with his wife, incumbent congresswoman Dahlia Loyola. Her opponent is former Vice Mayor Eloisa Tolentino.

Carmona Mayoralty Election
Party	Candidate	Votes	%
NPC	Dahlia Loyola	35,071	76.64
PLM	Eloisa Tolentino	10,688	23.36
Total votes		45,759	100

Carmona Vice Mayoralty Election
Party	Candidate	Votes	%
NPC	Cesar Ines, Jr.	33,834	79.88
PLM	Alexis Reyes	8,524	20.12
Total votes		42,358	100

==== General Mariano Alvarez ====
Incumbent Maricel Echevarria-Torres assumed office upon the resignation of her father, former mayor Walter Echevarria. She is running for her first full three-year term. Her opponents are former councilor Ruel Calix, Ed Custodio, Merlita Fernando, incumbent vice mayor Angela Pacayna, Ricardo Restrivera and former mayor Ona Virata.

General Mariano Alvarez Mayoralty Election
Party	Candidate	Votes	%
Independent	Ruel Calix	1,079	0.01
Independent	Ed Custodio	7,500	0.10
PDP–Laban	Merlita Fernando	233	0.31
NPC	Angela Paycana	25,238	33.88
Independent	Ricardo Restrivera	756	1.01
NUP	Maricel Echevarria-Torres	33,938	45.55
PFP	Ona Virata	5,758	7.73
Total votes		74,502	100

Incumbent Angela Pacayna, who assumed the post after Maricel Torres took over as mayor is running for mayor. Her party nominated Bong Sevilla. Her opponents are former vice mayor Percival Cabuhat and Gerry Mojica.

General Mariano Alvarez Vice Mayoralty Election
Party	Candidate	Votes	%
NUP	Percival Cabuhat	35,341	50.85
PFP	Gerry Mojica	4,870	7.01
NPC	Bong Sevilla	29,294	42.15
Total votes		69,505	100

==== Silang ====
Incumbent Mayor Corie Poblete is not running. Her sister, former mayor Emilia Lourdes "Omil" Poblete is her party's nominee will face off against incumbent Board Member Atty. Kevin Amutan Anarna.

Silang Mayoralty Election
Party	Candidate	Votes	%
NUP	Kevin Amutan Anarna	62,478	52.32
NPC	Emilia Lourdes "Omil" Poblete	52,071	43.61
PDDS	Omhil Poblete	3,648	3.06
Independent	Joey Perando	487	0.41
Independent	Odie Poblete	399	0.33
Independent	Lands Amadure	322	0.27
Total votes		120,035	100%

Incumbent vice mayor Aidel Paul Belamide is running for board member. This will be a three-way fight between former police general and Calabarzon police chief Ted Carranza, incumbent three-term councilors Ronnie "Isang-Bagsak" Doneza and Allan Tolentino.

Silang Vice Mayoralty Election
Party	Candidate	Votes	%
NUP	Ted Carranza	43,206	37.83
NPC	Ronnie "Isang-Bagsak" Doneza	36,502	31.96
KBL	Allan Tolentino	34,517	30.21
Total votes		114,225	100%

=== 6th District ===
==== General Trias ====
General Trias Mayoralty Election
Party	Candidate	Votes	%
NUP	Luis A. Ferrer IV	121,896	100
Total votes		121,896	100

General Trias Vice Mayoralty Election
Party	Candidate	Votes	%
NUP	Jonas Labuguen	114,419	100
Total votes		114,419	100

=== 7th District ===
==== Trece Martires City ====
Incumbent Mayor Gemma Lubigan and is running for reelection. Lubigan will be opposed by former three-term mayor Melandres "Melan" De Sagun, who substituted for his brother Bong De Sagun in this race to bid to reclaim his old seat.

Trece Martires Mayoralty Election
Party	Candidate	Votes	%
PDDS	Melandres "Melan" De Sagun	24,550	27.49
NUP	Gemma Lubigan	64,742	72.51
Total votes		89,292	100

Incumbent Vice Mayor Bobby Montehermoso is also running for re-election. He will face incumbent Cabuco punong barangay Jun "Tatang" Rollo.

Trece Martires Vice Mayoralty Election
Party	Candidate	Votes	%
NUP	Romeo Montehermoso Jr.	53,789	62.49
PDP–Laban	Jun Rollo	32,293	37.51
Total votes		86,082	100

==== Amadeo ====
Incumbent Mayor Redel John Dionisio, running for a second term, is the only known Cavite mayor who is openly supportive of the presidential bid of Manila Mayor Isko Moreno Domagoso. He will be opposed by incumbent vice mayor and former mayor Conrado Viado.

Amadeo Mayoralty Election
Party	Candidate	Votes	%
Aksyon	Redel John Dionisio	15,317	64.05
PRP	Conrado Viado	8,597	35.95
Total votes		23,914	100

Incumbent vice mayor Conrado Viado is seeking to get back to the post he inherited in 2017 upon the death of then-elected mayor Albert Ambagan Sr.

Amadeo Vice Mayoralty Election
Party	Candidate	Votes	%
Aksyon	Joseph Robles Legaspi	14,349	63.03
PRP	Leo Angelo Bayot	8,415	36.97
Total votes		22,764	100

==== Indang ====
Indang Mayoralty Election
Party	Candidate	Votes	%
NUP	Perfecto Fidel	19,628	55.63
Independent	Raquel Quiambao	15,654	44.37
Total votes		35,282	100

Indang Vice Mayoralty Election
Party	Candidate	Votes	%
NUP	Ismael Rodil	26,143	100
Total votes		26,143	100

==== Tanza ====
Incumbent Mayor Yuri Pacumio is running unopposed for his third and final term. ABC President Arch Angelo "SM" Matro will be his running mate.

This will be the first election in Tanza that no one from the Arayata family is running for any position, whether in the town or province.

Tanza Mayoralty Election
Party	Candidate	Votes	%
NUP	Yuri Pacumio	100,136	100
Total votes		100,136	100

Tanza Vice Mayoralty Election
Party	Candidate	Votes	%
NUP	Arch Angelo Matro	100,723	100
Total votes		100,723	100

=== 8th District ===
==== Tagaytay City ====
Incumbent Agnes Tolentino is term-limited and is initially running for Congresswoman, switching her husband, incumbent congressman Abraham Tolentino. However, she withdrew her candidacy and ran for Vice Mayor substituting incumbent Vice Mayor Reymond Ambion.

Tagaytay Mayoralty Election
Party	Candidate	Votes	%
NUP	Abraham Tolentino	37,999	100
Total votes		37,999	100

Tagaytay Vice Mayoralty Election
Party	Candidate	Votes	%
NUP	Agnes Tolentino	37,644	100
Total votes		37,644	100

==== Alfonso ====
Incumbent mayor Randy Salamat, a businessperson and restaurateur who owns Grupo Alegria, a chain of fine dining restaurants in Metro Manila and Singapore, is running for a second term. He will be opposed by incumbent 8th district board member Virgilio Varias, who is seeking to return to his old position.

Alfonso Mayoralty Election
Party	Candidate	Votes	%
NUP	Randy Salamat	19,087	61.97
NPC	Virgilio Varias	11,711	38.03
Total votes		30,798	100

Alfonso Vice Mayoralty Election
Party	Candidate	Votes	%
Independent	Benjamin Mardo	357	1.21
NUP	Madona Pel	14,901	50.42
NPC	Agnes Vidallon	14,296	48.37
Total votes		29,554	100

==== General Emilio Aguinaldo ====
General Emilio Aguinaldo Mayoralty Election
Party	Candidate	Votes	%
NPC	Danilo Bencito	6,683	48.19
NUP	Dennis Glean	6,769	48.81
Independent	Cesar Glorioso	415	2.99
Total votes		13,867	100

General Emilio Aguinaldo Vice Mayoralty Election
Party	Candidate	Votes	%
NUP	Allan Glean	4,937	36.50
NPC	Michael Manalo	6,662	49.25
KBL	Garry Tafalla	1,928	14.25
Total votes		13,527	100

==== Magallanes ====
Incumbent mayor Jasmin Maligaya is running for her final term unopposed. This is her first time running unopposed.

Magallanes Mayoralty Election
Party	Candidate	Votes	%
Aksyon	Jasmin Maligaya	11,279	100
Total votes		11,279	100

Incumbent vice-mayor "Renato Dimapilis" switch places with the incumbent councilor "Jesus Antazo" he is opposed by the barangay captain of Brgy. Bendita 1 "Honorato Limboc" partnering with the incumbent mayor Maligaya.

Jesus Antazo won the vice mayoralty position with just a margin of 190 votes.

Magallanes Vice Mayoralty Election
Party	Candidate	Votes	%
NUP	Jesus Antazo	6,789	50.71
Aksyon	Honorato Limboc	6,599	49.29
Total votes		13,388	100

Municipal Councilors will be elected by gaining the Top 8 highest votes. They are the one who will make Municipal Ordinances, Laws, and Resolutions.

Magallanes Municipal Council Election
Party	Candidate	Votes	%
Aksyon	Lea Bernal-Galvez	4,273	4.79
NUP	Malen Binauhan-Gloriani	2,365	2.65
NUP	Renato Dimapilis	5,619	6.3
NUP	Regal Hierco	3,191	3.58
Aksyon	Elisa Hierco	5,021	5.63
NUP	John Carlo Maldonado	4,805	5.39
Aksyon	Janessa Maligaya	9,137	10.24
Aksyon	Rommel Manalo	5,070	5.68
Aksyon	Allister John Mojica	6,381	7.15
Aksyon	Amang Reduca	6,616	7.41
Aksyon	Jayson Santiago	5,470	'6.13
NUP	Felipe Signo	2,774	3.11
Aksyon	Aina Mari Sisante	8,747	9.8
NUP	Felipe Sisante	5,251	5.88
NUP	Marcelo Sisante	4,867	5.45
Independent	Edilardo Vicedo	4,479	5.02
NUP	Renato Villanueva	5,162	5.79

Incumbent councilors Tafalla and Vidallo are not running for any position.

==== Maragondon ====
Maragondon Mayoralty Election
Party	Candidate	Votes	%
NPC	Aldous Angeles	7,006	25.80
Liberal	Lawrence Arca	10,403	38.30
NUP	Noel Rillo	9,751	35.90
Total votes		27,160	100

Maragondon Vice Mayoralty Election
Party	Candidate	Votes	%
NPC	Ireneo Angeles	8,911	34.23
Liberal	Alfredo Bersabe	7,976	30.64
KBL	Nolito Magallanes	203	0.78
NUP	Bernie Ilagan	8,944	34.36
Total votes		26,034	100

==== Mendez-Nuñez ====
Mendez-Nuñez Mayoralty Election
Party	Candidate	Votes	%
NUP	Francisco Mendoza Jr.	11,179	55.92 %
Aksyon	Maria Cielo May Vida	8,812	44.07 %
Total votes		19,991	99.99 %

Mendez-Nuñez Vice Mayoralty Election
Party	Candidate	Votes	%
NUP	Ruel Vicedo	6,448	33.71 %
Independent	Romero Rafols	2,863	14.97 %
Aksyon	Ronnie Rocillo	9,813	51.31 %
Total votes		19,124	99.99%

==== Naic ====
Naic Mayoralty Election
Party	Candidate	Votes	%
KBL	Rhodel Binato	902	0.01
Independent	Louie Caballes	112	0
NPC	Ruperto Dualan	33,764	47.54
PROMDI	Cesar Loyola, Jr.	3,337	4.7
Independent	Benjie Medina	300	0.42
NUP	Rogelio Pangilinan	29,077	40.94
PFP	Paul Mc Villaluz	3,531	4.97
Total votes		71,023	100

Naic Vice Mayoralty Election
Party	Candidate	Votes	%
NPC	Junio Dualan	35,520	51.67
NUP	Cesar Ryan Nazareno	21,057	30.63
KBL	Rona Nazareno	4,065	5.91
PFP	Rosendo Pinpin Jr.	3,008	4.38
PROMDI	Dok Pipit	5,092	7.4
Total votes		68,742	100

==== Ternate ====
Ternate Mayoralty Election
Party	Candidate	Votes	%
UNIDO	Lamberto Bambao	7,316	51.76
KANP	Nuno Catalasan	3,023	21.39
PROMDI	Minio Lindo	3,723	26.34
Independent	Lito Reyes	72	0.51
Total votes		14,134	100

Ternate Vice Mayoralty Election
Party	Candidate	Votes	%
PROMDI	Vicky Acosta	1,070	7.76
UNIDO	Salvador Gubio Jr.	6,579	47.72
KANP	Laurel Lindo	6,139	44.52
Total votes		13,788	100
