= Cavite's 8th congressional district =

House of Representatives of the Philippines legislative district

- Constituency for the House of Representatives of the Philippines
- Interactive map of district boundaries
- Location of Cavite within the Philippines
- Province: Cavite
- Region: Calabarzon
- Population: 453,666 (2020)
- Electorate: 312,602 (2025)
- Major settlements: 8 LGUs: City; Tagaytay; Municipalities; Alfonso; General Emilio Aguinaldo; Magallanes; Maragondon; Mendez; Naic; Ternate
- Area: 558.10 km^{2} (215.48 sq mi)

Current constituency
- Created: 2018
- Representative: Aniela Tolentino
- Political party: NUP
- Congressional bloc: Majority

Cavite's 8th congressional district is one of the eight congressional districts of the Philippines in Cavite. It has been represented in the House of Representatives of the Philippines since 2019. The district consists of the southern city of Tagaytay and the municipalities of Alfonso, General Emilio Aguinaldo, Magallanes, Maragondon, Mendez, Naic, and Ternate, bordering the provinces of Batangas and Laguna. It is currently represented in the 20th Congress by Aniela Tolentino of the National Unity Party (NUP).

The district was created in 2018 after General Trias became the sole component of Cavite's 6th district. This change prompted the reorganization of the province's congressional districts: the former components of the 6th district, together with Indang, became the new 7th district, while the areas that had comprised the old 7th district, except for Indang, were reconstituted as the new 8th district.

== Representation history ==
#	Image	Member	Term of office		Congress	Party	Electoral history	Constituent LGUs
#	Image	Member	Start	End	Congress	Party	Electoral history	Constituent LGUs
=== Cavite's 8th district for the House of Representatives of the Philippines ===
District created September 17, 2018.
1		Abraham Tolentino (born 1964)	June 30, 2019	June 30, 2022	18th	PDP-Laban	Redistricted from the 7th district and re-elected in 2019.	2019–present Alfonso, General Emilio Aguinaldo, Magallanes, Maragondon, Mendez, Naic, Tagaytay, Ternate
1		Abraham Tolentino (born 1964)	June 30, 2019	June 30, 2022	18th	NUP	Redistricted from the 7th district and re-elected in 2019.	2019–present Alfonso, General Emilio Aguinaldo, Magallanes, Maragondon, Mendez, Naic, Tagaytay, Ternate
2		Aniela Tolentino (born 1996)	June 30, 2022	Incumbent	19th	NUP	Elected in 2022.	2019–present Alfonso, General Emilio Aguinaldo, Magallanes, Maragondon, Mendez, Naic, Tagaytay, Ternate
2		Aniela Tolentino (born 1996)	June 30, 2022	Incumbent	20th	NUP	Re-elected in 2025.	2019–present Alfonso, General Emilio Aguinaldo, Magallanes, Maragondon, Mendez, Naic, Tagaytay, Ternate

== Election results ==
=== 2025 ===
2025 Philippine House of Representatives election in Cavite's 8th congressional district
Party	Candidate	Votes	%
NUP	Aniela Tolentino	167,163	76.60
Aksyon	Irene Bencito	45,398	20.80
Independent	Allan Par	5,676	2.60
Total votes		218,237	100
NUP hold			

=== 2022 ===
2022 Philippine House of Representatives elections
Party	Candidate	Votes	%
NUP	Aniela Tolentino	166,077	89.74
Independent	Allan Par	18,995	10.26
Total votes		185,072	100%
NUP hold			

=== 2019 ===
2019 Philippine House of Representatives elections
Party	Candidate	Votes	%
PDP–Laban	Abraham Tolentino	143,367	100.00%
Invalid or blank votes		42,165	22.91%
Total votes		185,977	100.00%
PDP–Laban win (new seat)			

== See also ==
- Legislative districts of Cavite
