= Aniela Tolentino =

Filipino politician

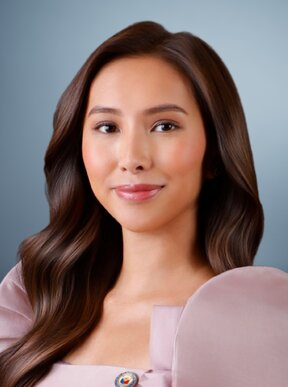
- Official portrait, 2026

Member of the Philippine House of Representatives from Cavite's 8th District
- Incumbent
- Assumed office June 30, 2022
- Preceded by: Abraham Tolentino

Chairperson of the Philippine House Committee on Climate Change
- Incumbent
- Assumed office July 30, 2025
- Preceded by: Edgar Chatto

Personal details
- Born: Aniela Bianca Delgado Tolentino; May 8, 1996 (age 30) Quezon City, Philippines
- Party: NUP
- Parents: Abraham Tolentino (father); Agnes Tolentino (mother)
- Relatives: Athena Tolentino (sister); Francis Tolentino (uncle)
- Education: Queen's University at Kingston; University College London; Dublin City University
- Occupation: Politician; businesswoman

Aniela Bianca Delgado Tolentino (born May 8, 1996) is a Filipino politician and businesswoman who has served as the representative for Cavite's eighth district since 2022.

== House of Representatives ==
Tolentino entered politics in 2021, when she substituted her mother, then-Tagaytay Mayor Agnes Tolentino, as the candidate for representative in Cavite's eighth district in 2022 after the latter withdrew to instead run for vice mayor of Tagaytay. She eventually won the race, succeeding her term-limited father Abraham Tolentino, who was in turn elected mayor of Tagaytay. She was re-elected in 2025. During the 20th Congress, she chairs the House Committee on Climate Change and is the vice chairman of the House Committee on Foreign Affairs.

Tolentino has been a proponent of agricultural education, supporting initiatives to establish farming high schools across different regions of the Philippines.

== Electoral history ==
Electoral history of Aniela Tolentino
Year	Office	Party	Votes received				Result
Year	Office	Party	Total	%	P.	Swing	Result
2022	Representative (Cavite–8th)	NUP	166,077	89.74	1st	—N/a	Won
2025	Representative (Cavite–8th)	NUP	167,163	76.60	1st	-13.14	Won

== Personal life ==
Tolentino owns Papa Bolo, a brewery in Tagaytay.
