= Magallanes, Cavite =

Municipality in Cavite, Philippines

Magallanes
- Municipality
- Municipality of Magallanes
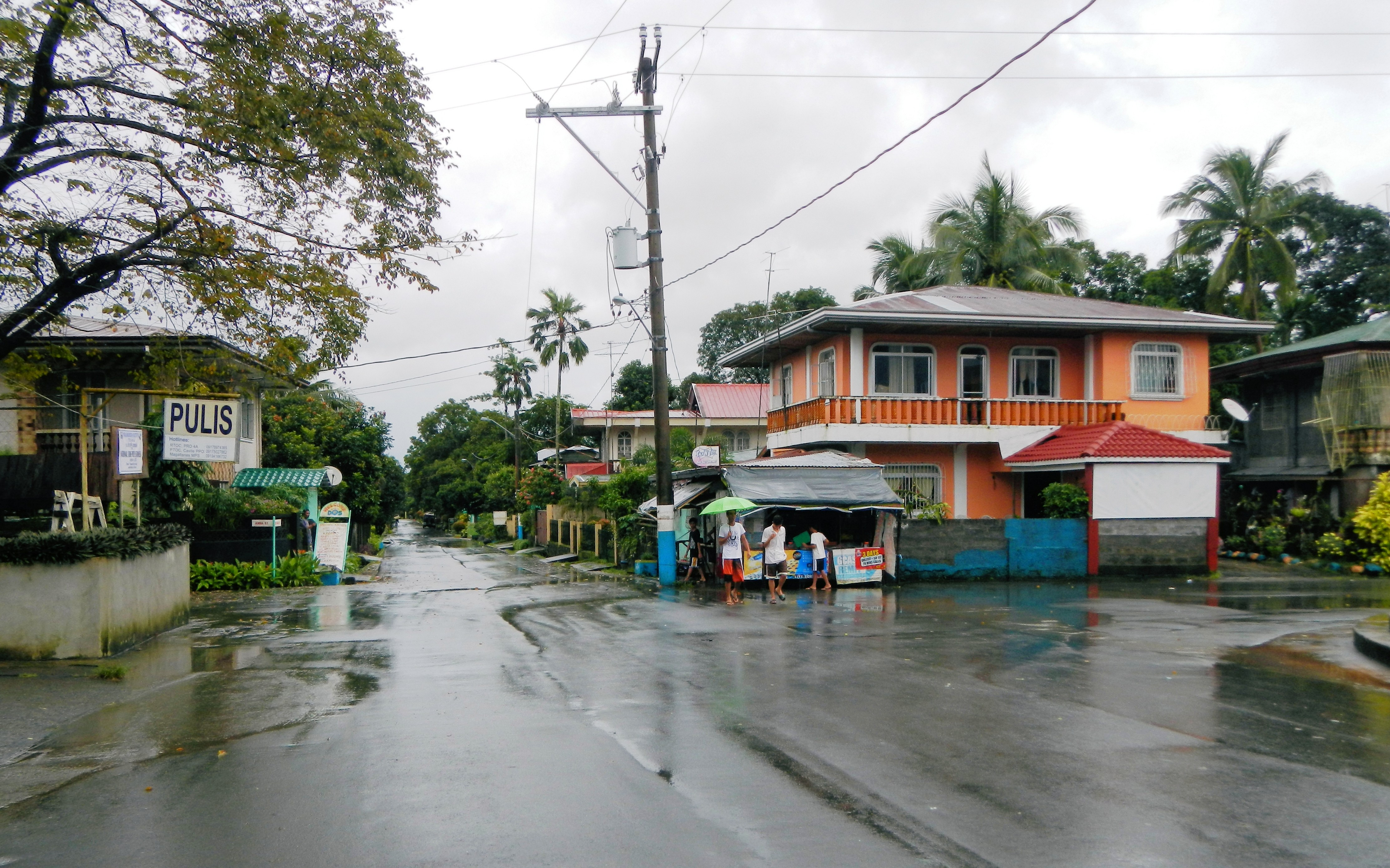
- Street in Magallanes

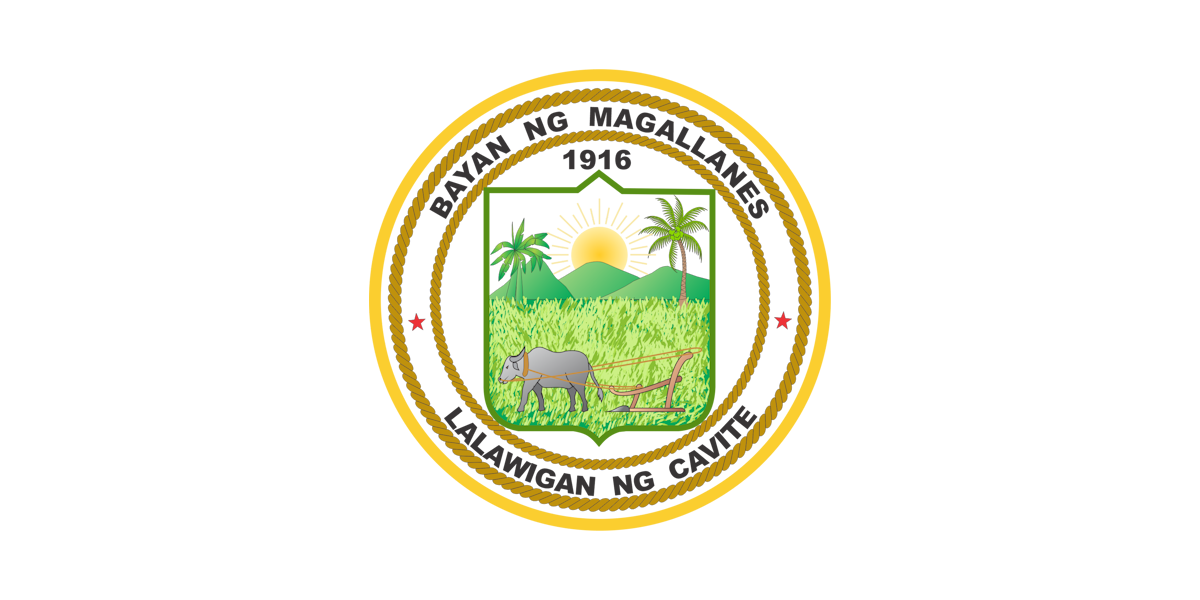
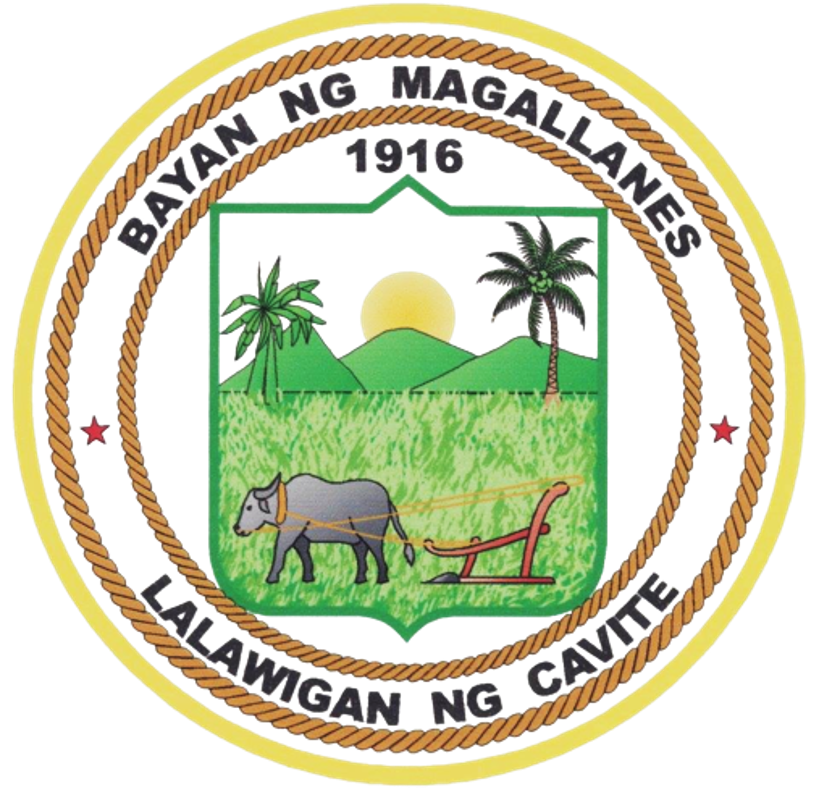
- Flag Seal
- Nickname: Eco-Tourism Center
- Map of Cavite with Magallanes highlighted
- Interactive map of Magallanes
- Location within the Philippines
- Coordinates: 14°11′N 120°45′E
- Country: Philippines
- Region: Calabarzon
- Province: Cavite
- District: 8th district
- Founded: July 15, 1879
- Annexation to Maragondon: October 15, 1903
- Chartered: 1916
- Named for: Ferdinand Magellan
- Barangays: 16 (see Barangays)

Government
  - Type: Sangguniang Bayan
  - Mayor: Jasmin Angelli Maligaya-Bautista
  - Vice Mayor: Jesus B. Antazo
  - Representative: Aniela Bianca D. Tolentino
  - Municipal Council: Members: Janessa Ann M. de Remayo; Aina Mari M. Sisante; Mar B. Reduca; John Alister P. Mojica; Renato A. Dimapilis; Jayson P. Santiago; Felipe V. Sisante Jr.; Renato M. Villanueva
  - Electorate: 17,601 voters (2025)

Area
  - Total: 73.07 km^{2} (28.21 sq mi)
- Elevation: 215 m (705 ft)
- Highest elevation: 643 m (2,110 ft)
- Lowest elevation: 15 m (49 ft)

Population (2024 census)
  - Total: 25,826
  - Density: 353.4/km^{2} (915.4/sq mi)
  - Households: 5,785

Economy
  - Income class: 3rd municipal income class
  - Poverty incidence: 16.93% (2023)
  - Revenue: ₱ 175.5 million (2024)
  - Assets: ₱ 379.1 million (2024)
  - Expenditure: ₱ 73.29 million (2024)
  - Liabilities: ₱ 151.3 million (2024)

Service provider
  - Electricity: Manila Electric Company (Meralco)
- Time zone: UTC+8 (PST)
- ZIP code: 4113
- PSGC: 0402112000
- IDD : area code: +63 (0)46
- Native languages: Tagalog
- Website: www.magallanescavite.gov.ph

Magallanes, officially the Municipality of Magallanes (Tagalog: Bayan ng Magallanes), is a municipality in the province of Cavite, Philippines. According to the 2024 census, it has a population of 25,826 people.

== Etymology ==
The municipality is named after Ferdinand Magellan, who was known in Spanish as Fernando de Magallanes.

== History ==
Magallanes began its history as a barrio called Panitan, then a part of the municipality of Maragondon. Panitan was derived from the Tagalog word "panit", meaning "to remove the bark of a tree". Long before the coming of the Spaniards, there grew along the mountainside of this barrio big trees called bitangcol which provide a source of income for the people. The barks of the trees are removed and used as containers for storing palay or unhusked rice. The fibers of the barks were removed and twined into durable ropes. Because of this unusual occupation of the people the barrio came to be known as Panitan or Banitan.

The first inhabitants of Panitan were Isidro Baltao, Glicerio Manalo, Florentino Mojica, and Ignacio Arat. Time came when the people, tired of travelling the long distance to the poblacion of Maragondon, decided to seek the separation of the barrio and its conversion into an independent municipality. Isidro Baltao headed a three-man delegation to Manila to petition the Spanish Governor-General Domingo Moriones for the conversion of Panitan into a town.

While still in Manila, Baltao and his companions were walking along the paved streets of Intramuros when they came upon Magallanes street. There and then, they decided to recommend that the new municipality be named Magallanes in honor of Ferdinand Magellan. The governor-general was said to have been impressed by the name Magallanes, and he also named the barrios of the new town after Spanish leaders and missionaries like Urdaneta, Ramirez, Pacheco, and Medina. Other streets of the town were also named after prominent Spaniards like Jovellar, Salcedo, Anda, Colon, San Jose, and San Isidro. The principal street was named Real (Royal), in honor of the Spanish king. Another street bore the name of De Guia after the patron saint of the town, Nuestra Señore de Guia.

Barrio Panitan, renamed Magallanes, became an independent municipality on July 15, 1879. The first gobernadorcillo of Magallanes was Anastacio Diones. The designation gobernadorcillo was changed to capitan municipal shortly before the outbreak of the Philippine Revolution. Juan Bello, a former capitan municipal, was the leader of Filipino revolutionists again Spain. When the Americans came the title, capitan municipal was changed to municipal president.

On October 15, 1903, the town was reverted to being part of Maragondon when its annual income became insufficient to maintain its status as an independent municipality. It was only in 1916 that Magallanes once again became a town.

On February 15, 1972, amidst a spate of assassinations against Cavite government officials, Liberal Mayor Anatalio L. Reyes was shot and killed in an ambush by hidden gunmen in Maragondon while he was on the road back to Magallanes from Cavite City with policemen. Reyes' brother-in-law, a policeman and a hitchhiker were also among the casualties, while only two policemen survived.

== Geography ==
Magallanes is situated about 97 kilometers (60 mi) south of Manila. Maragondon bounds the town on the north while the municipality of General Emilio Aguinaldo borders the north-east. Alfonso shares its southeast limits, while Nasugbu, Batangas is at the southern end. Classified as one of the upland communities of the province, Magallanes is situated about 2,000 feet (610 m) above sea level.

=== Barangays ===
Magallanes is politically subdivided into 16 barangays, as indicated in the matrix below. Each barangay consists of puroks and some have sitios.

PSGC	Barangay	Population			±% p.a.	
		2024		2010		
042112001	Baliwag	6.3%	1,617	1,388	▴	1.06%
042112002	Bendita I	7.7%	1,999	1,720	▴	1.05%
042112003	Caluangan	5.9%	1,532	1,380	▴	0.73%
042112004	Medina	9.1%	2,345	1,903	▴	1.46%
042112005	Pacheco	8.2%	2,107	1,701	▴	1.49%
042112006	Barangay 1 (Pob.)	4.5%	1,155	1,023	▴	0.84%
042112007	Barangay 2 (Pob.)	1.1%	276	356	▾	−1.75%
042112008	Barangay 3 (Pob.)	1.4%	351	330	▴	0.43%
042112009	Barangay 4 (Pob.)	2.3%	598	552	▴	0.56%
042112010	Barangay 5 (Pob.)	3.2%	829	659	▴	1.60%
042112011	Ramirez	7.1%	1,841	1,713	▴	0.50%
042112012	Tua	7.5%	1,940	1,971	▾	−0.11%
042112013	Urdaneta	8.6%	2,225	2,092	▴	0.43%
042112014	Kabulusan	7.2%	1,854	1,675	▴	0.71%
042112015	Bendita II	5.2%	1,354	1,194	▴	0.88%
042112016	San Agustin	7.1%	1,828	1,574	▴	1.04%
	Total		25,826	21,231	▴	1.37%

=== Climate ===
Climate data for Magallanes, Cavite
Month	Jan	Feb	Mar	Apr	May	Jun	Jul	Aug	Sep	Oct	Nov	Dec	Year
Mean daily maximum °C (°F)	28 (82)	29 (84)	31 (88)	33 (91)	31 (88)	30 (86)	28 (82)	28 (82)	28 (82)	29 (84)	29 (84)	28 (82)	29 (85)
Mean daily minimum °C (°F)	20 (68)	19 (66)	20 (68)	21 (70)	23 (73)	23 (73)	23 (73)	23 (73)	23 (73)	22 (72)	21 (70)	20 (68)	22 (71)
Average precipitation mm (inches)	10 (0.4)	10 (0.4)	12 (0.5)	27 (1.1)	94 (3.7)	153 (6.0)	206 (8.1)	190 (7.5)	179 (7.0)	120 (4.7)	54 (2.1)	39 (1.5)	1,094 (43)
Average rainy days	5.2	4.5	6.4	9.2	19.7	24.3	26.9	25.7	24.4	21.0	12.9	9.1	189.3
Source: Meteoblue (modeled/calculated data, not measured locally)

== Demographics ==
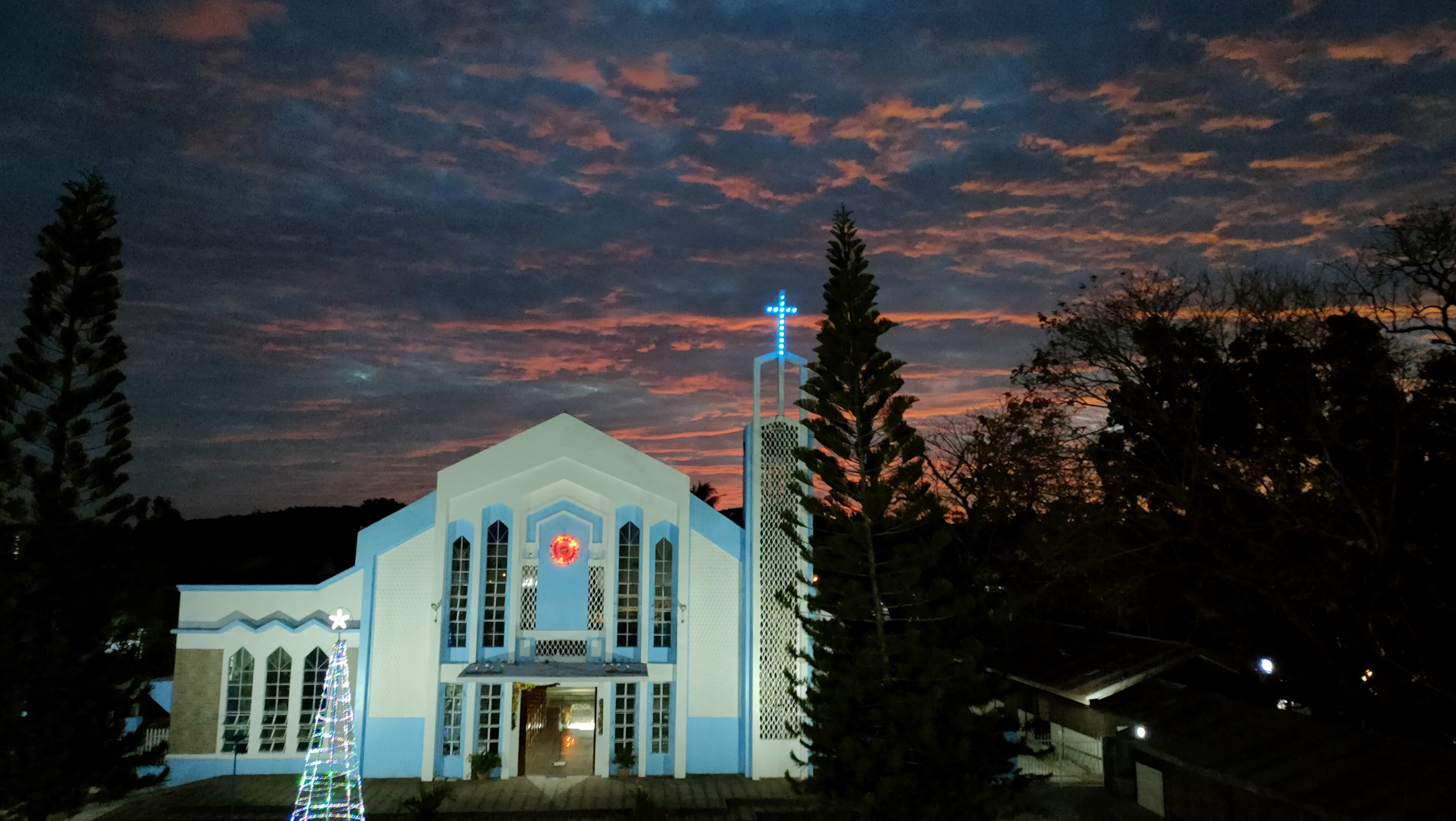
Nuestra Señora De Guia Parish, a Catholic church in Magallanes town proper

Population census of Magallanes

Year	Pop.	±% p.a.
1903	3,750	—
1918	2,845	−1.82%
1939	4,095	+1.75%
1948	3,998	−0.27%
1960	5,436	+2.59%
1970	7,294	+2.98%

Year	Pop.	±% p.a.
1975	9,330	+5.06%
1980	9,691	+0.76%
1990	12,556	+2.62%
1995	17,115	+5.98%
2000	18,090	+1.19%
2007	18,890	+0.60%

Year	Pop.	±% p.a.
2010	21,231	+4.34%
2015	22,727	+1.31%
2020	23,851	+1.02%
2024	25,826	+1.93%

Source: Philippine Statistics Authority

In the 2024 census, the population of Magallanes was 25,826 people, with a density of 350 inhabitants per square kilometer or 910 inhabitants per square mile.

== Economy ==
Poverty incidence of Magallanes (%)

Source: Philippine Statistics Authority

Although the main source of livelihood in Magallanes is agriculture, it is evident that there has been a shift in emphasis from rice farming to coffee production because of the growing market demand for coffee. This is revealed in a study made by the Provincial Development Staff at Trece Martires. Another reason is that the production of rice, corn and a wide variety of vegetables and fruits is more than sufficient to satisfy the nutritional demand of the population.

Despite the town’s agricultural potential, livestock and poultry production remain limited and primarily confined to backyard operations. Addressing this deficit requires promoting commercial-scale farming. The local development plan emphasizes the introduction of high-yielding breeds and the conversion of idle lands into grazing pastures to boost productivity.

Magallanes has a potential labor force of 5,066 or 52.3% of the total population. However, only 2,725 or 54% of this number are economically active. The town has also a low unemployment rate of 3.7% with only 100 of this labor force listed as unemployed. The existence of large and productive agricultural lands offers a wide variety of economic activities. The agricultural sector absorbs as much as 82% of the labor force, while the service sector comprising teachers and government employees and workers account for only 15.6%. A negligible 2.4% are absorbed by the manufacturing, transportation and other commercial industries.

In 1980, the municipality's 2,250 families with an average of four members per family, earned a total of ₱17,992,882 (equivalent to ₱344,117,821 in 2021), showing an average family income of ₱7,997.00 (equivalent to ₱152,944 in 2021). About 71.9% of the number belonged to the low group while 24.1% comprised the middle class group. Only about 4% of the population constituted the high income group. About 54% or 1,223 families fall below the food threshold of ₱5,272.86 (equivalent to ₱100,845 in 2021) and 1,781 or 79% were below the total threshold of ₱9,895.87 (equivalent to ₱189,261 in 2021).

The 1980 economic survey shows that the municipality had 2,043 households occupying 2,015 dwelling units, or a slight shortage of 28 housing units. Majority of the dwellings were of strong materials, including wood, galvanized iron, and concrete. The large percentage of houses using concrete may be due to the presence of a large gravel deposit comprising more than 300 hectares (740 acres) located in barangays Ramirez and Urdaneta. Plans for its development is now under study by the provincial government coordination with the Bureau of Mines.

Magallanes faces deficiencies in health and sanitation services, lacking one doctor, one nurse, one dentist, and two barangay health stations. These shortages are compounded by low public awareness of proper sanitation and nutrition, particularly among lower-income residents, which worsens the overall health conditions in the municipality.

Transportation within and outside the town is mainly by tricycles and jeepneys. It has approximately 77.639 kilometers (48.243 mi) of road, 43.922 kilometers (27.292 mi) being classified as primary, 19.217 kilometers (11.941 mi) as secondary, and 15.5 kilometers (9.6 mi) tertiary road. It has one national road with a length of 22.35 kilometers (13.89 mi), one provincial road extending 0.263 kilometers (0.163 mi), eight municipal roads with a total length of 3.026 kilometers (1.880 mi), and 18 barangay roads totalling 52 kilometers (32 mi).

Electricity in the municipality is served by Meralco, which serves almost every part of the municipality. Water is supplied by the Magallanes Water System although some areas get their water from artesian wells, open wells, and springs.

Population growth is relatively low in Magallanes due to outmigration. The lack of employment and educational opportunities has caused the skilled workers to settle elsewhere.

== Government ==
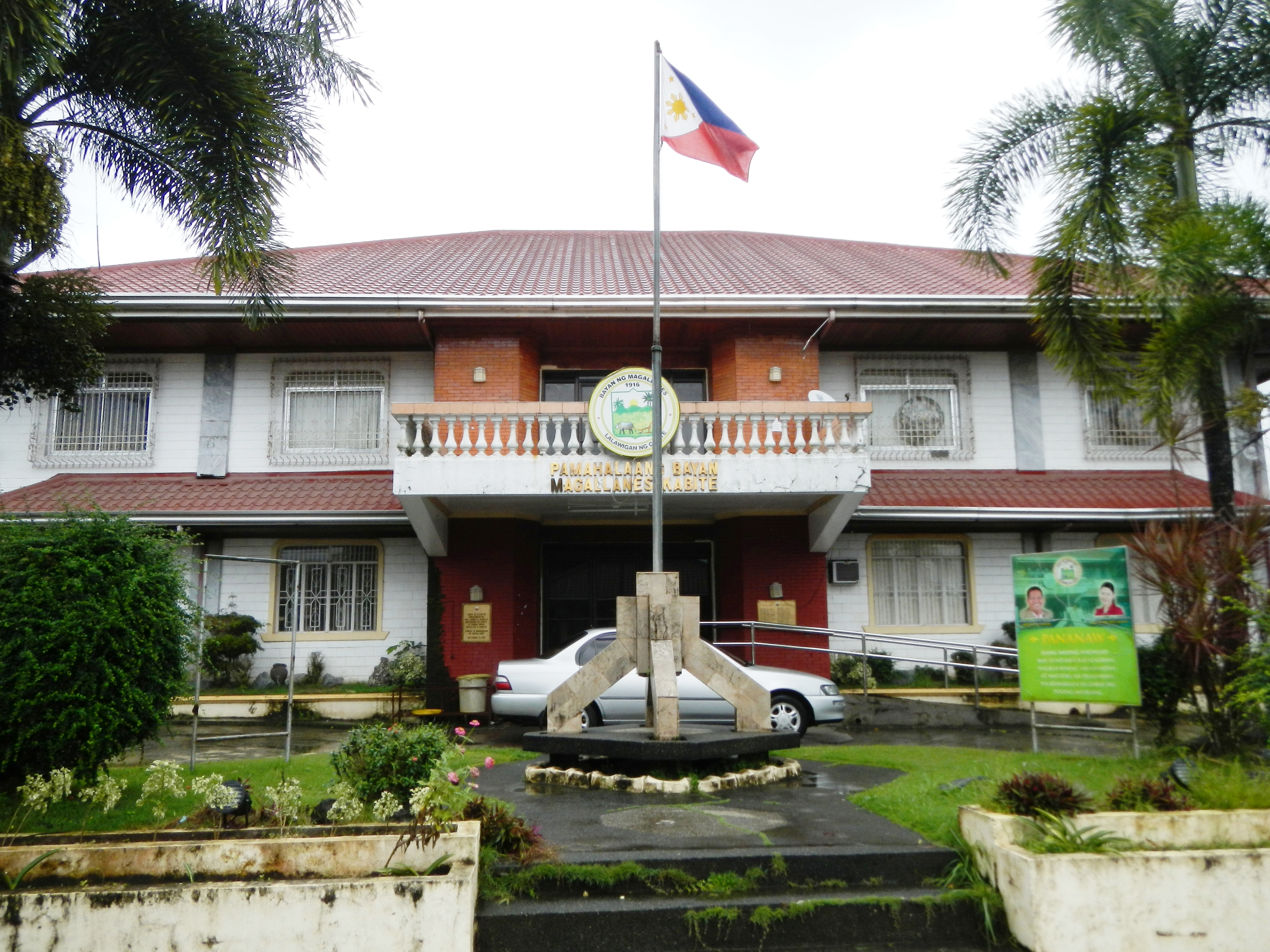
Magallanes Town Hall

=== Elected officials ===
The following are the elected officials of the town elected in 2022 which serves until 2025:

Position	Official
Mayor	Jasmin Maligaya-Bautista (Aksyon)
Vice Mayor	Jesus B. Antazo (NUP)

Sangguniang Bayan Members	Party
Janessa Ann Maligaya-de Remayo	NPC
Aina Mari M. Sisante	Aksyon
Mar B. Reduca	NPC
John Alister P. Mojica	Aksyon
Renato A. Dimapilis	NUP
Jayson P. Santiago	Aksyon
Felipe V. Sisante, Jr.	NUP
Renato M. Villanueva	NUP
ABC President
SK Federation President

=== List of local chief executives ===
The following is a list of town heads of Magallanes since it became a municipality:

Gobernadorcillos

- Anastacio Diones, 1880–1881
- Ciriaco Rillo, 1881–1882
- Braulio Mendoza (Teniente Primero), 1882
- Benito Bello, 1883–1884
- Juan Bello, 1887–1888
- Luis Rillo, 1888–1889
- Modesto Cuajunco, 1890–1891
- Juan Bello, 1892–1893

Capitanes Municipal

- Juan Bello, 1894–1897
- Pastor Bilugan, 1897–1898
- Juan Bello, 1898–1900.

Municipal Presidents

- Modesto Cuajunco, 1900–1901
- Juan Bello, 1902–1904 (Note: Magallanes reverted to a barrio from 1904 to 1916).
- Quirico Ogot (acting capacity), 1916–1917
- Agapito Espineli (elected), 1917–1919
- Antonio Espineli, 1920–1922
- Zacarias Diones, 1923–1925
- Agapito Espineli, 1926–1928
- Zacarias Diones, 1929–1931
- Zacarias Diones, 1932–1934

Municipal Mayors

- Maximo Linantud, 1935–1937
- Felipe Espineli, 1938–1940
- Felipe Espineli, 1941–1943
- Benvenuto Espineli (acting), 1944–1945
- Gregorio Asuncion, ditto, 1946
- Calixto Espineli, ditto, 1947
- Benvenuto Espineli (elected), 1948–1950
- Benvenuto Espineli, 1951–1955
- Mariano de Raya, 1956–1959
- Mariano de Raya, 1960–1962
- Juan Ramos (Acting), 1962–1963
- Anatalio Reyes (elected), 1964–1967
- Felipe Custodio (Acting), 1967
- Anatalio Reyes (elected), 1967–1969
- Napoleon Beratio (acting), 1969–1970
- Alejandro Reyes (elected), 1970–1972
- Efinito Beltran, 1972–1980
- Napoleon Beratio (elected), 1980–1986, 1988-1998
- Filomeno Maligaya, 1998–2007
- Edwin Sisante, 2007-2016
- Jasmin Angelli M. Maligaya-Bautista, 2016-present

== Education ==
The Magallanes Schools District Office governs all educational institutions within the municipality. It oversees the management and operations of all private and public, from primary to secondary schools.

=== Primary and elementary schools ===
- Baliwag Elementary School
- Bendita Elementary School
- Cabulusan Elementary School
- Caluangan Elementary School
- De Guia Academy of Magallanes
- Magallanes Adventist Elementary School
- Magallanes Elementary School
- Medina Elementary School
- Pacheco Elementary School
- Ramirez Elementary School
- Tua Elementary School
- Urdaneta Elementary School

=== Secondary schools ===
- Bendita National High School
- Caluangan National High School
- Magallanes Western Cavite Institute

=== Higher educational institutions ===
- Gazellian College Foundation
- Kurios Christian Colleges Foundation
- Magallanes - Cavite West Point College
