= General Emilio Aguinaldo, Cavite =

Municipality in Cavite, Philippines

General Emilio Aguinaldo Bailen
- Municipality
- Municipality of General Emilio Aguinaldo
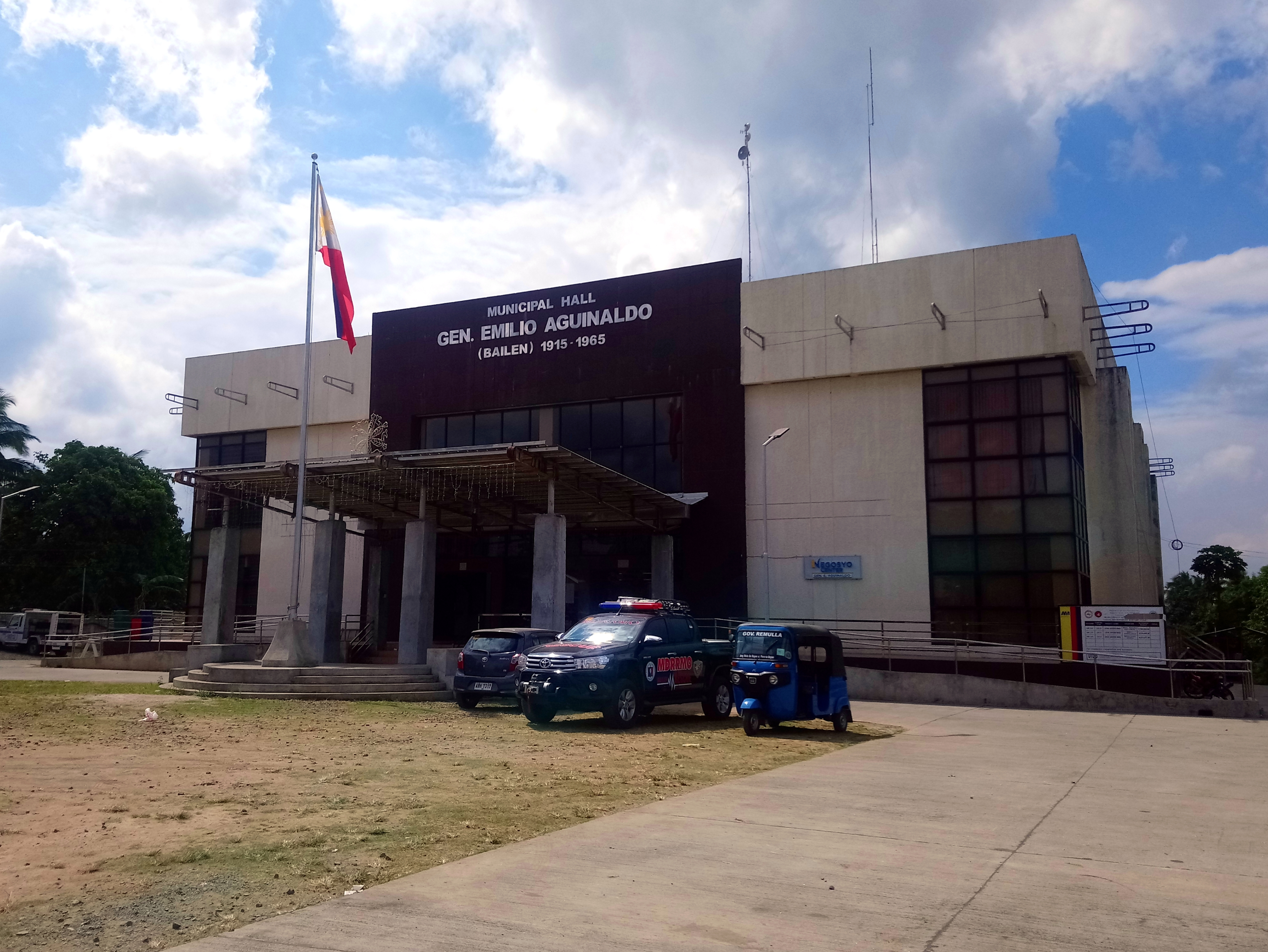
- The New Municipal Hall

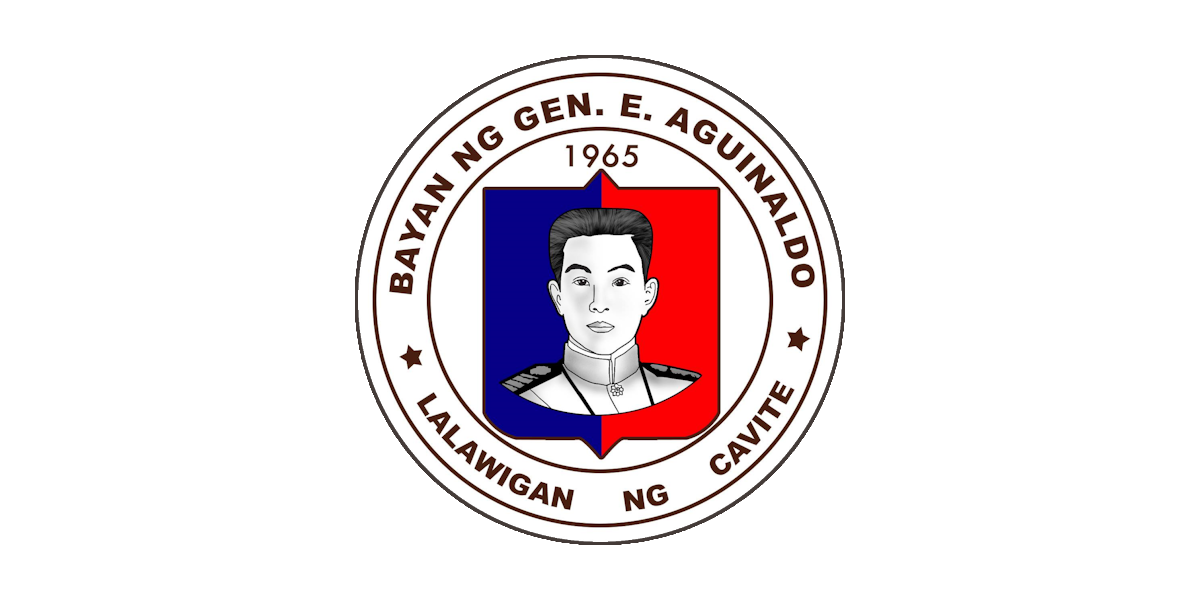
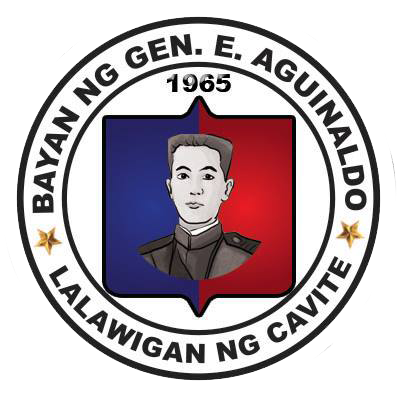
- Flag Seal
- Nickname: Center for Agro Modernization
- Map of Cavite with General Emilio Aguinaldo highlighted
- Interactive map of General Emilio Aguinaldo
- Location within the Philippines
- Coordinates: 14°11′N 120°48′E
- Country: Philippines
- Region: Calabarzon
- Province: Cavite
- Founded: 1858
- Annexation to Alfonso: October 15, 1903
- Chartered: 1915
- Renamed: June 19, 1965 (as General Emilio Aguinaldo)
- Named for: Emilio Aguinaldo
- Barangays: 14 (see Barangays)

Government
  - Type: Sangguniang Bayan
  - Mayor: Dennis M. Glean
  - Vice Mayor: Louel Golfo
  - Representative: Aniela Bianca D. Tolentino
  - Municipal Council: Members: Joseph B. Paiton; Bevan Ali C. Bencito; Joseph E. Lopez; Darwin I. Quiacos; Nepthalie A. Sernat; Manuel R. Bencito; Florencio P. Gloriani; Ricardo P. Binauhan
  - Electorate: 18,344 voters (2025)

Area
  - Total: 42.13 km^{2} (16.27 sq mi)
- Elevation: 234 m (768 ft)
- Highest elevation: 643 m (2,110 ft)
- Lowest elevation: 18 m (59 ft)

Population (2024 census)
  - Total: 24,264
  - Density: 575.9/km^{2} (1,492/sq mi)
  - Households: 5,323

Economy
  - Income class: 4th municipal income class
  - Poverty incidence: 14.15% (2023)
  - Revenue: ₱ 139.2 million (2024)
  - Assets: ₱ 294.6 million (2024)
  - Expenditure: ₱ 49.06 million (2024)
  - Liabilities: ₱ 66.54 million (2024)

Service provider
  - Electricity: Manila Electric Company (Meralco)
- Time zone: UTC+8 (PST)
- ZIP code: 4124
- PSGC: 0402107000
- IDD : area code: +63 (0)46
- Native languages: Tagalog
- Website: www.genaguinaldo.gov.ph

General Emilio Aguinaldo, officially the Municipality of General Emilio Aguinaldo (Tagalog: Bayan ng Heneral Emilio Aguinaldo), is a municipality in the province of Cavite, Philippines. According to the 2024 census, it has a population of 24,264 people.

Formerly known and still commonly referred to as Bailen, the municipality was renamed General Emilio Aguinaldo in honor of Emilio Aguinaldo, the first president of the Philippines and a native of Cavite.

== Etymology ==
The town is also known by its former official name, Bailen, named after the Spanish town of the same name. The town was established in 1858, the 50th anniversary of the Spanish victory against France in the Battle of Bailén that was fought in 1808 during the Peninsular War.

The municipality's current official name was adopted in 1965 and is named after Emilio Aguinaldo, the president of the First Philippine Republic and a native of Cavite who died the year before. In 2012, municipal administrators voted to revert the town's name back to Bailen; however, this was never ratified.

== History ==
=== Spanish era ===
Bailen was originally a Catholic parish of the neighboring town of Maragondon. It was established through a decree issued on August 28, 1857, by Archbishop Fray Aranguren, OSA, of the Archdiocese of Manila. The decree separated the barrios of Batas and Guyong-guyong from Maragondon, creating a new parish named Bailen after a town in the province of Jaén. Subsequently, residents of Barrio Batas petitioned Spanish Governor-General Fernando Norzagaray to convert their barrio into a municipality due to its distance from the town proper. The request was approved on August 2, 1858.

=== Revolutionary era ===
After the Cry of Pugad Lawin and the outbreak of the Philippine Revolution, Bailen was one of the towns that were liberated by the Katipuneros of Cavite. However, after the Spanish General Polavieja launched his offensive, General Emilio Aguinaldo's forces retreated to the upland towns of Cavite, including Bailen. The Spanish offensive followed and when they arrived in Bailen on May 18, 1897, Aguinaldo's forces could no longer be seen. They stayed for three days and when the inhabitants were uncooperative, the Spaniards burned the town and the church. When the inhabitants returned the day after the Spanish occupation, they saw their town already burned.

=== American era ===
The American civil government, from 1899 to 1901, reduced the number of towns to facilitate the military policy of concentrating the civilian population of the poblaciones. The Philippine Commission approved Act No. 947 on October 15, 1903, annexing the municipalities of Bailen and Mendez to Alfonso, thus becoming barrios of Alfonso. Bailen was reconverted into an independent municipality in 1915 with the complete restoration of peace and order in Cavite.

=== Post-war independence ===
On June 19, 1965, with the signing of Republic Act No. 4346, the town's name, Bailen, was changed to General Emilio Aguinaldo, in honor of the first Philippine president, who died the year prior.

=== Contemporary era ===
On September 3, 2012, administrators voted to revert the town's name back to Bailen. The Cavite Provincial Board unanimously approved Committee Report 118-2012, renaming General Emilio Aguinaldo, during the 95th Regular Session. However, the plebiscite to rename the municipality was never held.

== Geography ==
General Emilio Aguinaldo is located 82 kilometers (51 mi) from Metro Manila. It is bordered to the north and east by the town of Maragondon, by Alfonso to the south, and by Magallanes to the west.

=== Barangays ===
Bailen is politically subdivided into 14 barangays, as indicated in the matrix below. Each barangay consists of puroks and some have sitios.

Currently, there are 4 barangays which are classified as urban.

PSGC	Barangay	Population			±% p.a.	
		2024		2010		
042107001	A. Dalusag	5.2%	1,251	889	▴	2.37%
042107002	Batas Dao	4.2%	1,009	589	▴	3.77%
042107003	Castaños Cerca	12.3%	2,986	2,460	▴	1.34%
042107004	Castaños Lejos	11.4%	2,756	2,088	▴	1.92%
042107005	Kabulusan	8.1%	1,963	1,189	▴	3.50%
042107006	Kaymisas	5.1%	1,230	870	▴	2.41%
042107007	Kaypaaba	8.7%	2,102	1,354	▴	3.07%
042107008	Lumipa	4.1%	1,002	716	▴	2.33%
042107009	Narvaez	6.1%	1,486	1,013	▴	2.67%
042107010	Poblacion I	4.5%	1,082	715	▴	2.89%
042107011	Tabora	8.3%	2,026	1,515	▴	2.02%
042107012	Poblacion II	7.2%	1,744	1,566	▴	0.74%
042107013	Poblacion III	5.2%	1,270	985	▴	1.76%
042107014	Poblacion IV	7.4%	1,796	1,558	▴	0.98%
	Total		24,264	17,507	▴	2.27%

=== Climate ===
Climate data for General Emilio Aguinaldo, Cavite
Month	Jan	Feb	Mar	Apr	May	Jun	Jul	Aug	Sep	Oct	Nov	Dec	Year
Mean daily maximum °C (°F)	28 (82)	29 (84)	31 (88)	32 (90)	31 (88)	29 (84)	28 (82)	28 (82)	28 (82)	28 (82)	28 (82)	28 (82)	29 (84)
Mean daily minimum °C (°F)	19 (66)	19 (66)	20 (68)	21 (70)	23 (73)	23 (73)	23 (73)	23 (73)	23 (73)	22 (72)	21 (70)	20 (68)	21 (70)
Average precipitation mm (inches)	10 (0.4)	10 (0.4)	12 (0.5)	27 (1.1)	94 (3.7)	153 (6.0)	206 (8.1)	190 (7.5)	179 (7.0)	120 (4.7)	54 (2.1)	39 (1.5)	1,094 (43)
Average rainy days	5.2	4.5	6.4	9.2	19.7	24.3	26.9	25.7	24.4	21.0	12.9	9.1	189.3
Source: Meteoblue

== Demographics ==
Population census of General Emilio Aguinaldo
Year	Pop.	±% p.a.
1903	2,503	—
1918	3,635	+2.52%
1939	4,599	+1.13%
1948	5,002	+0.94%
1960	7,301	+3.20%
1970	10,275	+3.47%
1975	8,565	−3.58%
1980	9,571	+2.25%
1990	10,954	+1.36%
1995	11,893	+1.55%
2000	14,323	+4.07%
2007	17,818	+3.06%
2010	17,507	−0.64%
2015	22,220	+4.64%
2020	23,973	+1.61%
2024	24,264	+0.29%
Source: Philippine Statistics Authority

In the 2024 census, the population of General Emilio Aguinaldo was 24,264 people, with a density of 2,600 inhabitants per square kilometer or 6,700 inhabitants per square mile.

== Economy ==
Poverty incidence of General Emilio Aguinaldo (%)

Source: Philippine Statistics Authority

== Government ==
=== Local government ===
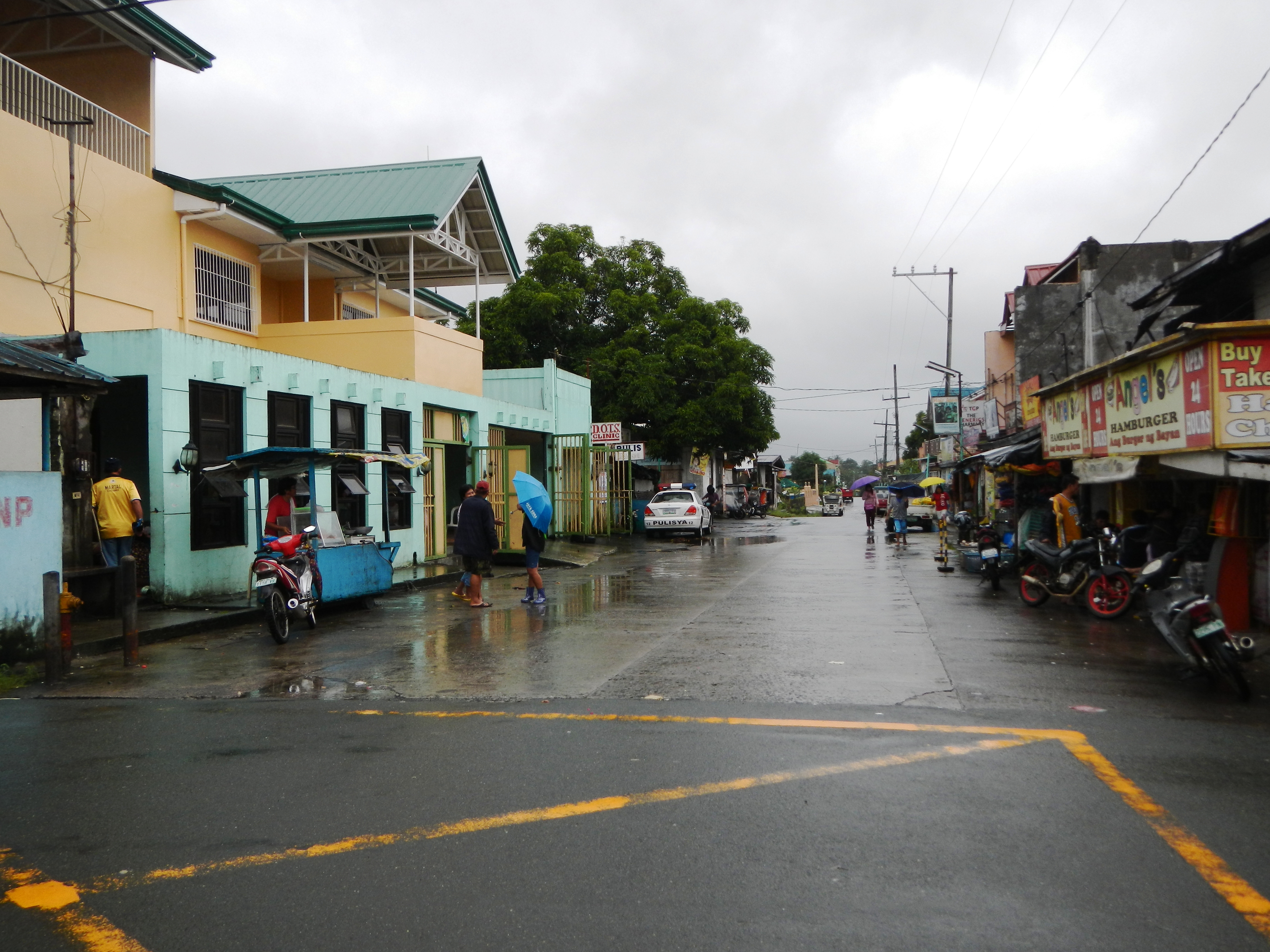
Downtown area

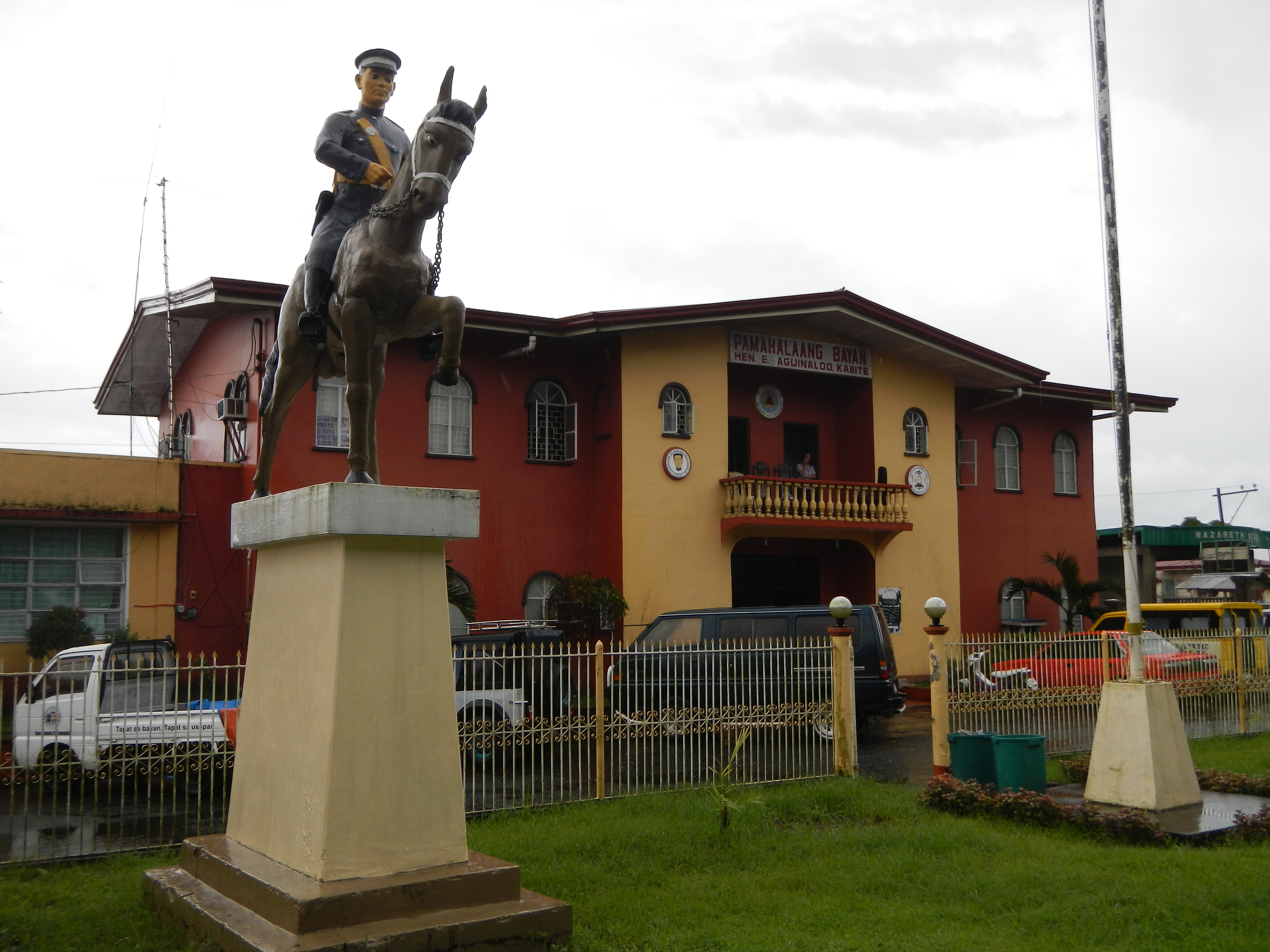
The old Municipal Hall with statue of Emilio Aguinaldo

The following are the elected officials of the town elected last May 9, 2022 which serves until 2025:

Position	Official
Mayor	Dennis M. Glean (NUP)
Vice Mayor	Michael B. Manalo (NPC)

Sangguniang Bayan Members	Party
Joseph B. Paiton	NPC
Bevan Ali C. Bencito	NPC
Joseph E. Lopez	NPC
Darwin I. Quiacos	NUP
Nepthalie A. Sernat	NUP
Manuel R. Bencito	NPC
Florencio P. Gloriani	NPC
Ricardo P. Binauhan	NUP
ABC President
Leonilo C. Bersabe	Non-partisan
SK Federation President
Dan Estine M. Mojica	Non-partisan

== Education ==
The General Emilio Aguinaldo Schools District Office governs all educational institutions within the municipality. It oversees the management and operations of all private and public, from primary to secondary schools.

=== Primary and elementary schools ===
- Bailen Elementary School
- Blessed Framar Christian Academy
- Castaños Elementary School
- Dao Elementary School
- Guyung-Guyong Elementary School
- Kabulusan Elementary School
- Kaymisas Elementary School
- Kaypaaba Elementary School
- Lumipa Elementary School
- Petal Preparatory School
- Narvaez Elementary School
- Nazareth School
- Tabora Elementary School

=== Secondary schools ===
- Gen. Emilio Aguinaldo National High School
- Holy Mother Cavite Institute

== See also ==
- List of renamed cities and municipalities in the Philippines
