= Mendez, Cavite =

Municipality in Cavite, Philippines

Mendez Mendez-Nuñez
- Municipality
- Municipality of Mendez-Nuñez
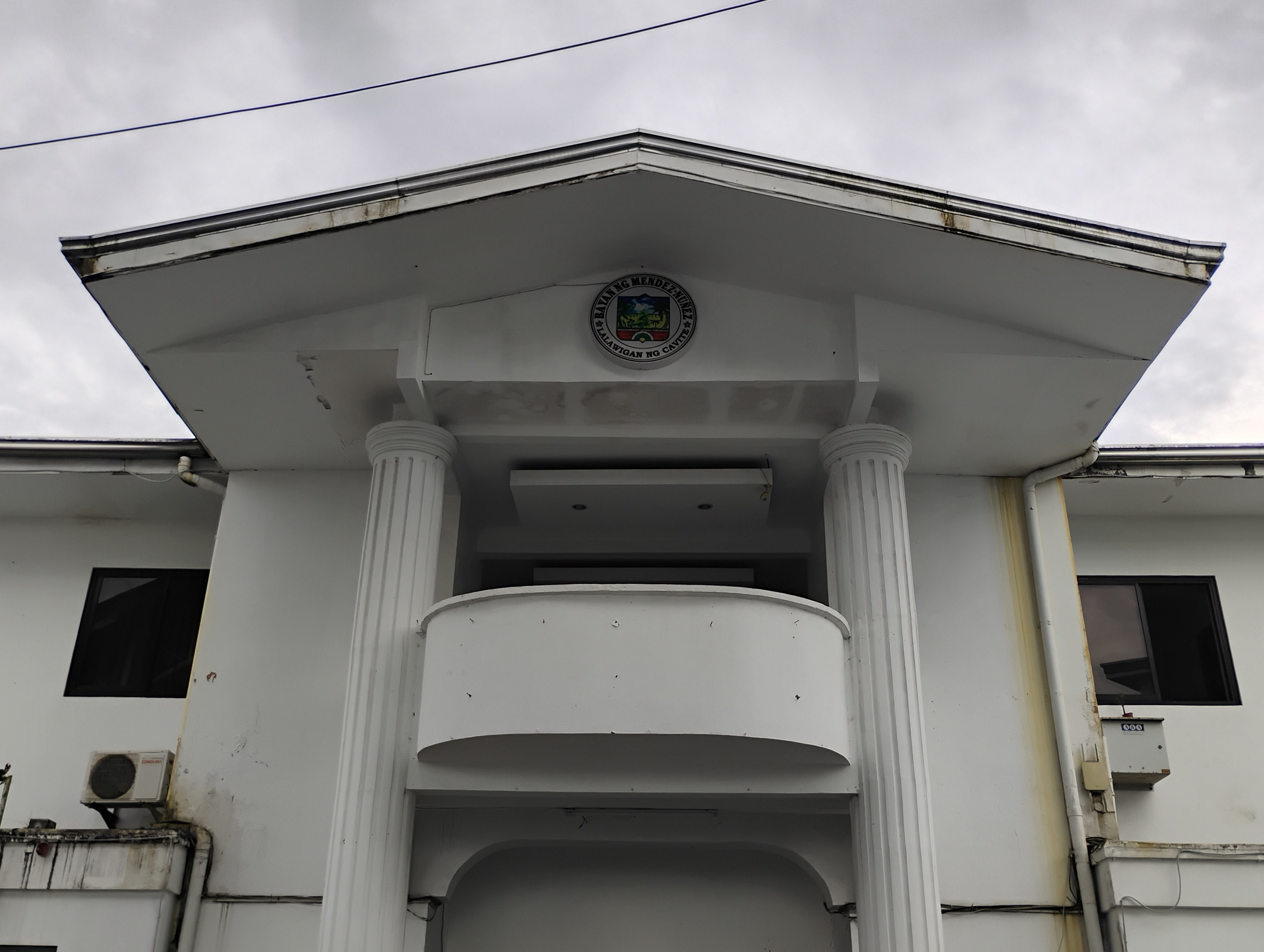
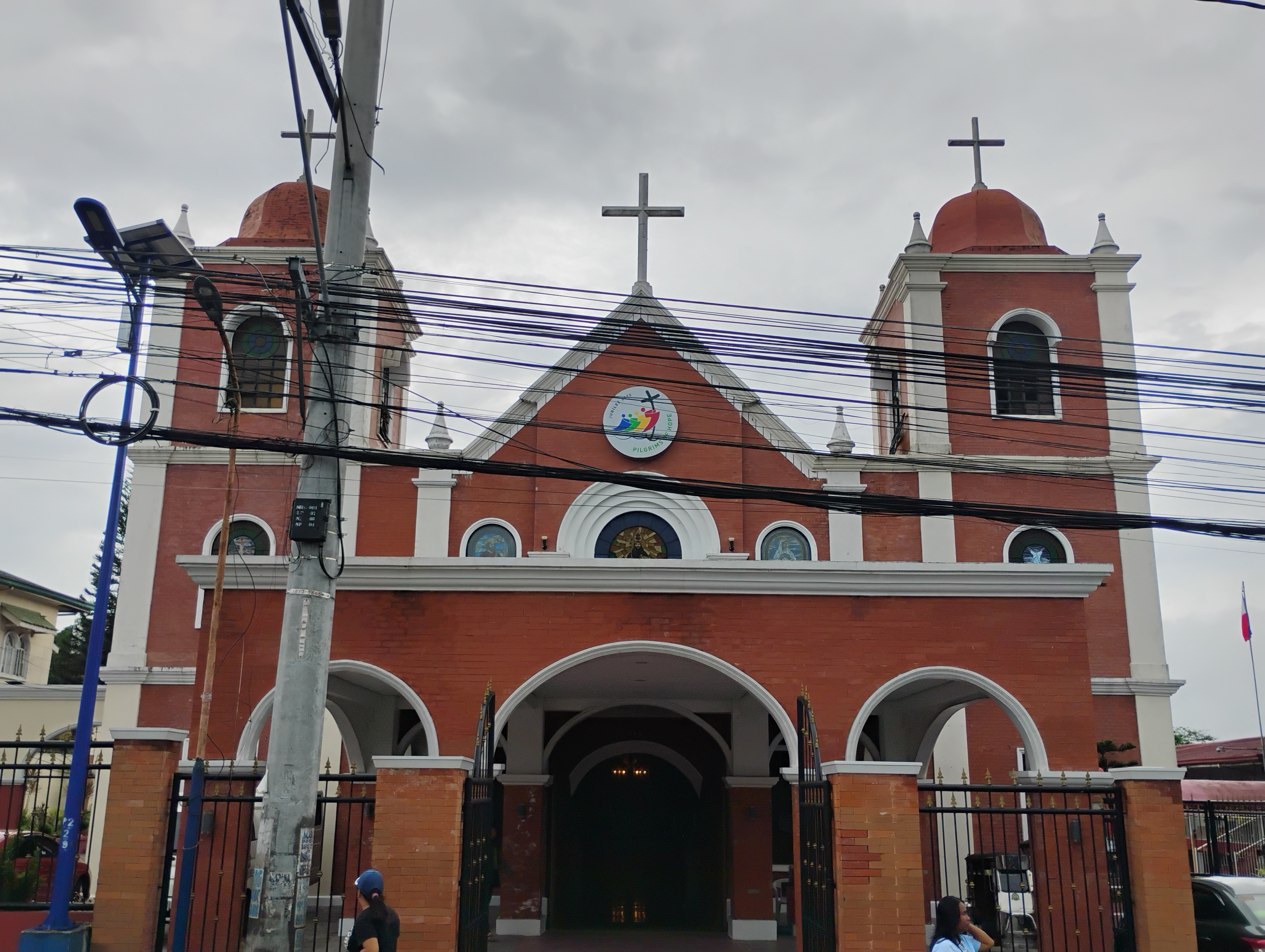
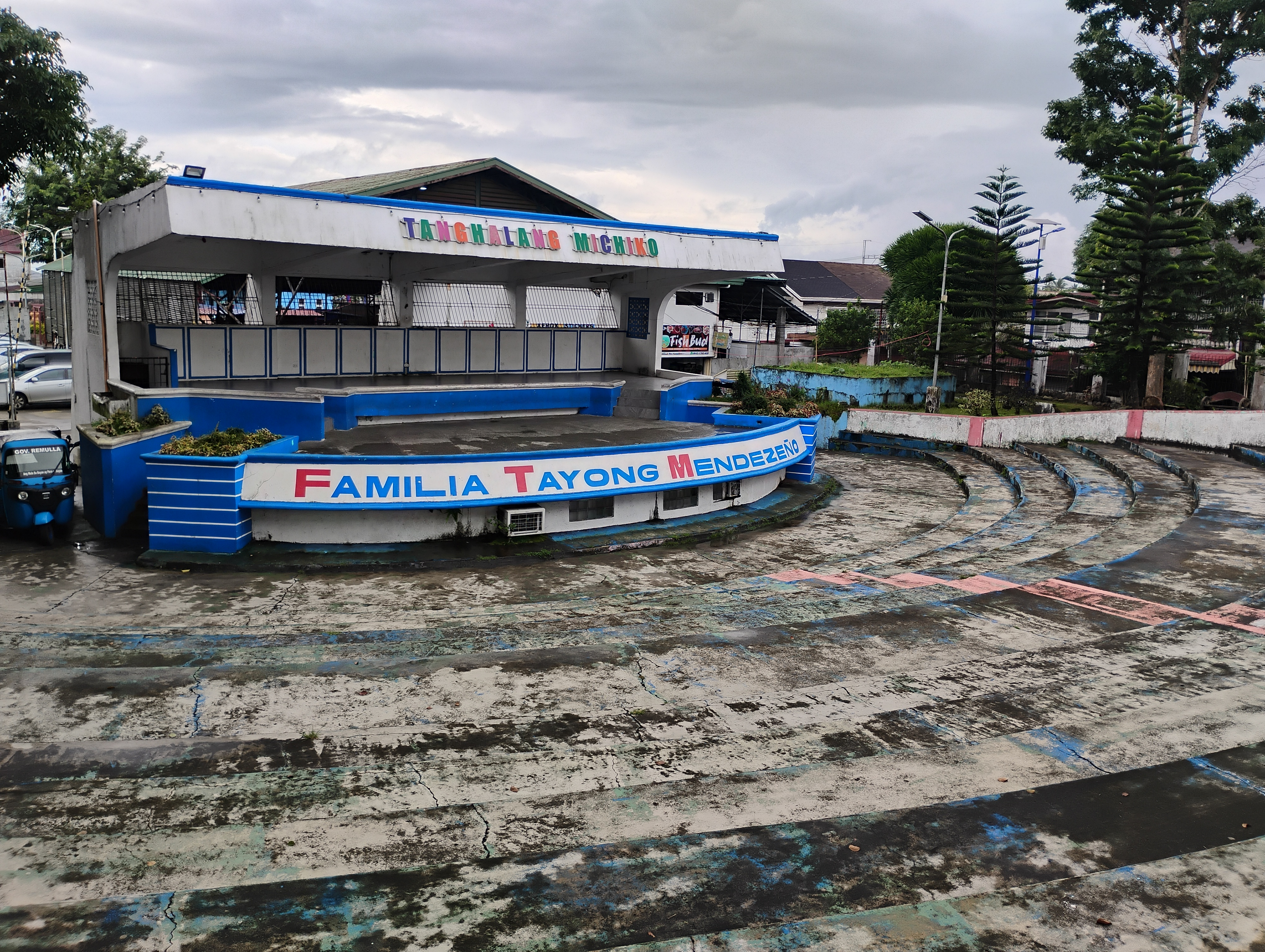
- Mendez Municipal Hall Saint Augustine Parish Church Tanghalang Michiko

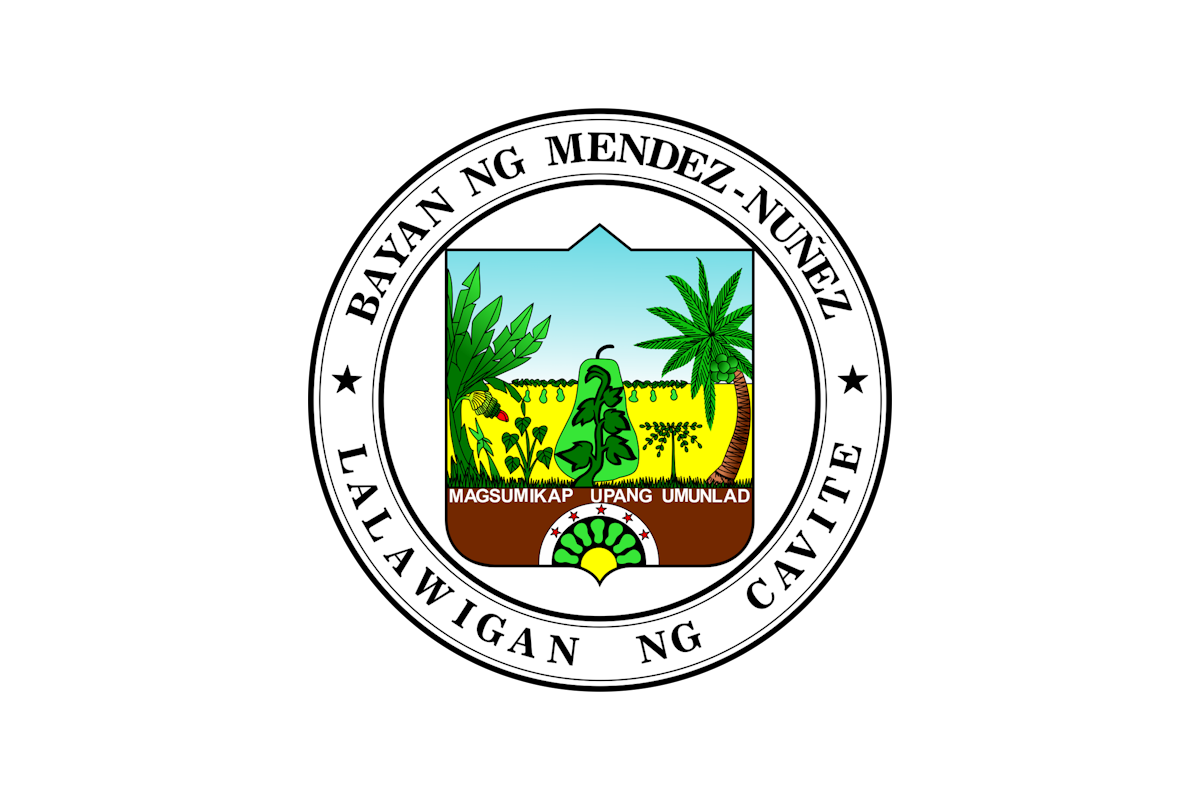
- Flag Seal

- Map of Cavite with Mendez highlighted
- Interactive map of Mendez
- Location within the Philippines
- Coordinates: 14°07′43″N 120°54′21″E
- Country: Philippines
- Region: Calabarzon
- Province: Cavite
- District: 8th district
- Founded: 1881
- Annexation to Alfonso: October 15, 1903
- Chartered: January 1, 1915
- Named for: Casto Méndez Núñez
- Barangays: 24 (see Barangays)

Government
  - Type: Sangguniang Bayan
  - Mayor: Francisco T. Mendoza Jr.
  - Vice Mayor: Raygan Dimapilis
  - Representative: Aniela Bianca D. Tolentino
  - Municipal Council: Members: Raygan N. Dimapilis; Jose N. Auditor; Roilan G. Ortiz; Razel V. Esguerra; Paulino S. Dimaranan Jr.; Alexander S. Ocampo; Romulo L. Martinez; Ruby Lita A. Bay-Remigio
  - Electorate: 24,079 voters (2025)

Area
  - Total: 43.27 km^{2} (16.71 sq mi)
- Elevation: 511 m (1,677 ft)
- Highest elevation: 700 m (2,300 ft)
- Lowest elevation: 237 m (778 ft)

Population (2024 census)
  - Total: 36,518
  - Density: 844.0/km^{2} (2,186/sq mi)
  - Households: 8,606

Economy
  - Income class: 2nd municipal income class
  - Poverty incidence: 12.05% (2023)
  - Revenue: ₱ 195.9 million (2024)
  - Assets: ₱ 461.1 million (2024)
  - Expenditure: ₱ 188.2 million (2024)
  - Liabilities: ₱ 127.6 million (2024)

Service provider
  - Electricity: Manila Electric Company (Meralco)
- Time zone: UTC+8 (PST)
- ZIP code: 4121
- PSGC: 0402114000
- IDD : area code: +63 (0)46
- Native languages: Tagalog
- Major religions: Roman Catholicism; Protestantism
- Feast date: August 28
- Catholic diocese: Diocese of Imus
- Patron saint: Saint Augustine of Hippo
- Website: www.mendez.gov.ph

Mendez, officially the Municipality of Mendez-Nuñez (Tagalog: Bayan ng Mendez), is a municipality in the province of Cavite, Philippines. According to the 2024 census, it has a population of 36,518 people.

== Etymology ==
The municipality of Mendez-Nuñez was originally known as "Gahitan", one of the many barrios of Indang. The name was derived from the word "gahit" meaning "to cut", because the people then had to cut down tall and thick cogon grass that abounded in the place in order to clear areas for agricultural and residential purpose.

== History ==
Over time, the number of houses in Gahitan grew, leading the sitio to become a barrio and eventually a full-fledged town on December 1, 1875, thanks to Governor-General Jose Malcampo y Monje (1874-1877). consolidated the three barrios of Gahitan, Palocpoc, and Anuling into an independent municipality named Méndez Núñez, in honor of the Spanish naval officer and close friend, Commodore Casto Méndez Núñez.

In 1856, when they were still Spanish naval officers, Malcampo and Mendez-Nuñez, established the first Masonic lodge in Kawit under a charter from the Grand Lodge of Portugal. The friendship of these two officers had been tested in many a battle against Muslim pirates in Mindanao.

Pedro Aure was the gobernadorcillo of Mendez during its first year as a municipality in 1876. Cayetano Aure, perhaps a relative of Pedro, was the first and only capitan municipal of Mendez during the First Philippine Republic (1899-1901). Pedro's son, Marcelino Aure, became a famous general during the Philippine Revolution. His nom de guerre was Alapaap (Cloud).

Mendez continued to be a municipality from 1875 to October 15, 1903 when, under Act No. 947 of the Philippine Commission, reduced the 23 municipalities of Cavite to eleven. Mendez and Bailen (now General Emilio Aguinaldo) were incorporated into the municipality of Alfonso.

But 12 years later, on January 1, 1915, Mendez regained its independent status as a municipality of Cavite.

== Geography ==
The municipality of Mendez is located 66 kilometers (41 mi) from Metro Manila and is accessible via Aguinaldo Highway. It is one of the smallest and upland towns of Cavite province. It is bounded to the north and east by Indang, to the south by Tagaytay, and to the west by Alfonso.

=== Barangays ===
Mendez is politically subdivided into 24 barangays, as indicated in the matrix below. Each barangay consists of puroks and some have sitios.

PSGC	Barangay	Population			±% p.a.	
		2024		2010		
042114001	Anuling Lejos I (Anuling)	4.4%	1,620	1,378	▴	1.12%
042114002	Asis I	10.0%	3,650	2,881	▴	1.64%
042114003	Galicia I	5.3%	1,918	1,484	▴	1.78%
042114004	Palocpoc I	4.5%	1,649	1,320	▴	1.54%
042114005	Panungyan I	5.5%	1,998	1,518	▴	1.91%
042114007	Poblacion I (Barangay I)	1.8%	645	564	▴	0.93%
042114008	Poblacion II (Barangay II)	1.7%	620	759	▾	−1.38%
042114009	Poblacion III (Barangay III)	3.0%	1,100	1,199	▾	−0.59%
042114010	Poblacion IV (Barangay IV)	1.6%	592	648	▾	−0.62%
042114011	Poblacion V (Barangay V)	2.4%	893	907	▾	−0.11%
042114012	Poblacion VI (Barangay VII)	3.5%	1,270	1,298	▾	−0.15%
042114013	Poblacion VII (Barangay VII)	2.2%	788	777	▴	0.10%
042114014	Anuling Cerca I	4.5%	1,630	1,383	▴	1.14%
042114015	Anuling Cerca II	3.4%	1,245	875	▴	2.46%
042114016	Anuling Lejos II	2.8%	1,010	712	▴	2.43%
042114017	Asis II	3.0%	1,106	915	▴	1.31%
042114018	Asis III	4.3%	1,563	1,318	▴	1.18%
042114019	Banayad	0.7%	258	168	▴	2.99%
042114020	Bukal	2.9%	1,043	485	▴	5.41%
042114021	Galicia II	5.1%	1,878	1,874	▴	0.01%
042114022	Galicia III	11.6%	4,239	2,959	▴	2.50%
042114023	Miguel Mojica	3.4%	1,242	716	▴	3.86%
042114024	Palocpoc II	3.4%	1,225	1,013	▴	1.32%
042114025	Panungyan II	4.6%	1,697	1,419	▴	1.24%
	Total		36,518	28,570	▴	1.70%

=== Climate ===
While it shares a general climate as the rest of the province Mendez' climate, due to its proximity to Tagaytay, is tropical highland, with low temperatures most especially during the early dry season.

Climate data for Mendez, Cavite
Month	Jan	Feb	Mar	Apr	May	Jun	Jul	Aug	Sep	Oct	Nov	Dec	Year
Mean daily maximum °C (°F)	25 (77)	27 (81)	28 (82)	30 (86)	28 (82)	27 (81)	26 (79)	25 (77)	25 (77)	26 (79)	26 (79)	25 (77)	27 (80)
Mean daily minimum °C (°F)	16 (61)	16 (61)	17 (63)	19 (66)	21 (70)	21 (70)	21 (70)	21 (70)	21 (70)	20 (68)	18 (64)	17 (63)	19 (66)
Average precipitation mm (inches)	11 (0.4)	13 (0.5)	14 (0.6)	32 (1.3)	101 (4.0)	142 (5.6)	208 (8.2)	187 (7.4)	175 (6.9)	131 (5.2)	68 (2.7)	39 (1.5)	1,121 (44.3)
Average rainy days	5.2	5.0	7.4	11.5	19.8	23.5	27.0	25.9	25.2	23.2	15.5	8.3	197.5
Source: Meteoblue

== Demographics ==
Population census of Mendez
Year	Pop.	±% p.a.
1903	3,743	—
1918	5,603	+2.73%
1939	6,393	+0.63%
1948	7,480	+1.76%
1960	11,427	+3.59%
1970	12,333	+0.77%
1975	13,844	+2.34%
1980	15,044	+1.68%
1990	17,652	+1.61%
1995	20,321	+2.67%
2000	22,937	+2.63%
2007	26,757	+2.15%
2010	28,570	+2.41%
2015	31,529	+1.89%
2020	34,879	+2.15%
2024	36,518	+1.11%
Source: Philippine Statistics Authority

In the 2024 census, the population of Mendez was 36,518 people, with a density of 840 inhabitants per square kilometre or 2,200 inhabitants per square mile.

== Economy ==
Poverty incidence of Mendez (%)

Source: Philippine Statistics Authority

== Government ==
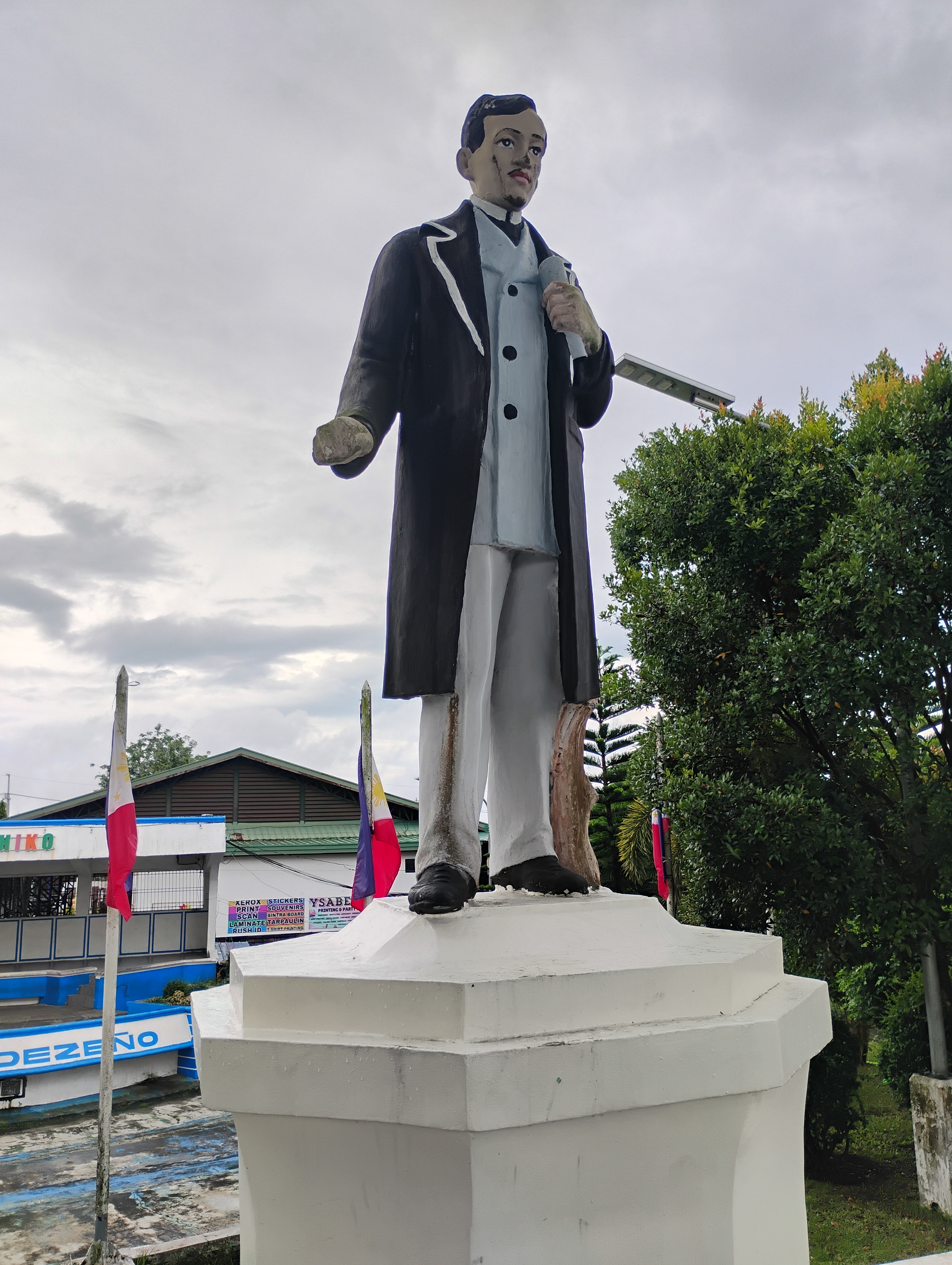
Jose Rizal Monument at Mendez Municipal Hall

=== Elected officials ===
The following are the elected officials of the municipality elected last May 12, 2025 to a term lasting until June 30, 2028:

Position	Official
Mayor	Francisco T. Mendoza Jr. (NUP)
Vice Mayor	Raygan N. Dimapilis (NPC)

Sangguniang Bayan Members	Party
Regidor Rocillo	NPC
Jose Auditor	NPC
Razel Esguerra	NPC
Elranie Nuestro	NUP
Alexander Ocampo	NUP
Paulino Dimaranan, Jr.	NUP
Kevin Christian Esguerra	NUP
Romulo Martinez	NUP

== Education ==
The Mendez Schools District Office governs all educational institutions within the municipality. It oversees the management and operations of all private and public, from primary to secondary schools.

=== Primary and elementary schools ===
- Amora 828 Christian Academy
- Anuling Elementary School
- Asis Elementary School
- Gahitan Elementary School
- Galicia Elementary School
- Green Grove Academy
- Mary's Greenfield Academy
- Mendez Central School
- Palocpoc Elementary School
- Panungyan Elementary School
- Saint Augustine School
- Saint Genevieve Global School of Science
- San Isidro Montessori
- St. Agnes Gracious School
- Tagaytay-Mendez Academy
- Witty Minds Montessori School
- Young Kwang Gukje School

=== Secondary schools ===
- Anuling Integrated High School
- Constancio E. Aure Sr. National High School
- Mendez Christian Academy
- Mendez-Nuñez Montessori
- Mendez-Nuñez National High School
- Palocpoc National High School
- Pedro Alegre Aure Senior High School

== Notable people ==
Source:

== Gallery ==
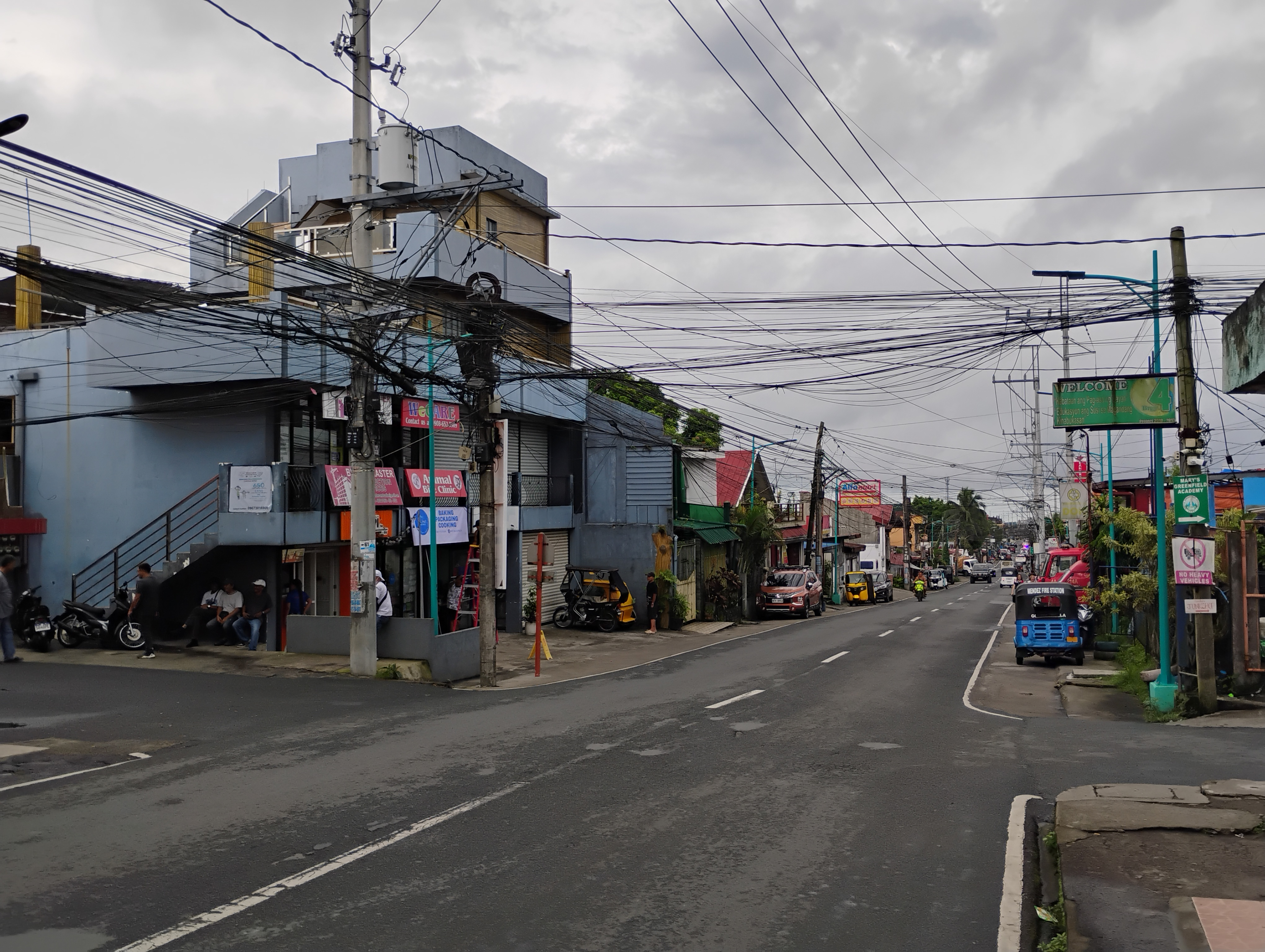
Mendez-Tagaytay Road in Mendez Town Proper

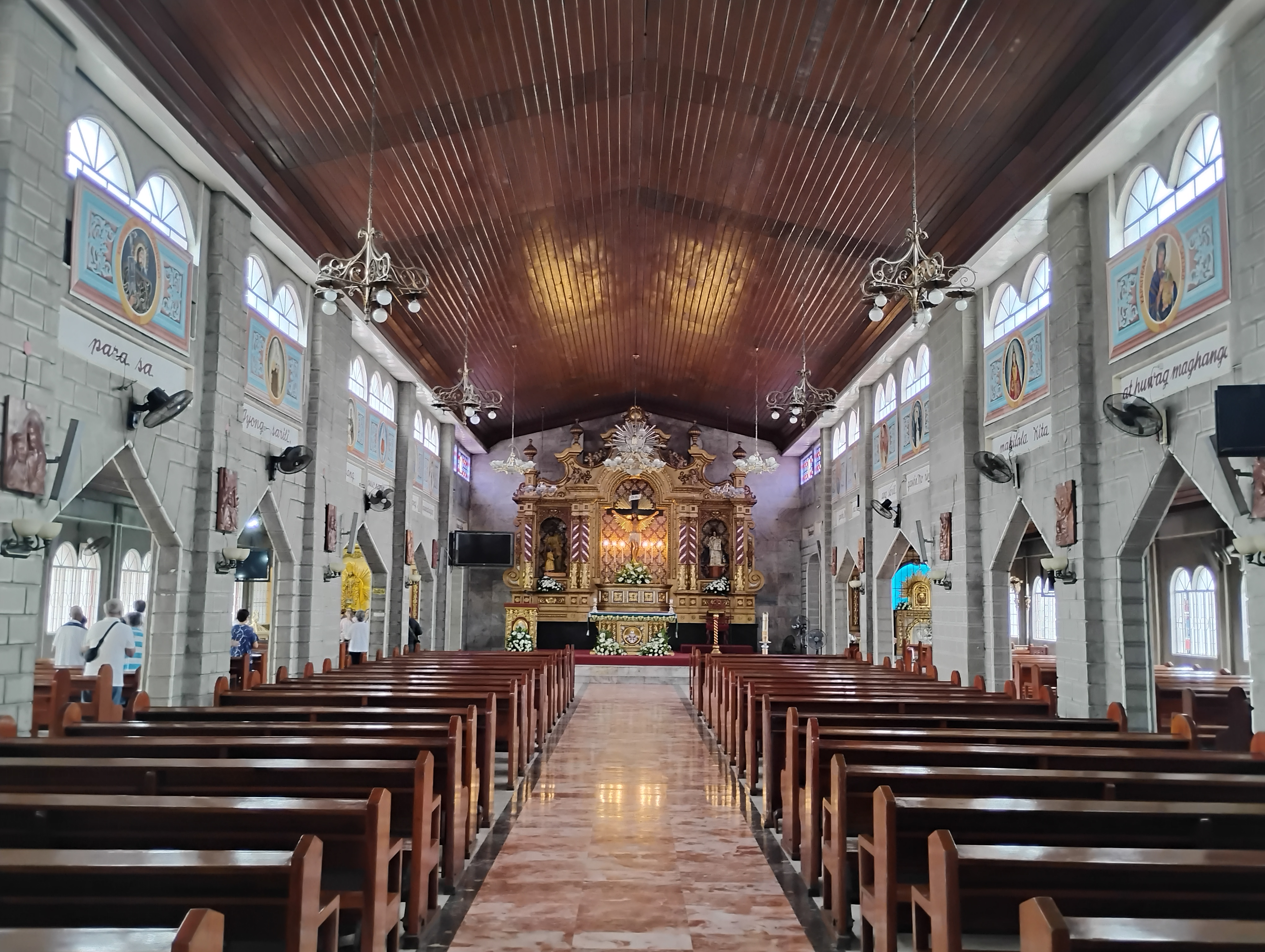
Interior of Saint Augustine Parish Church

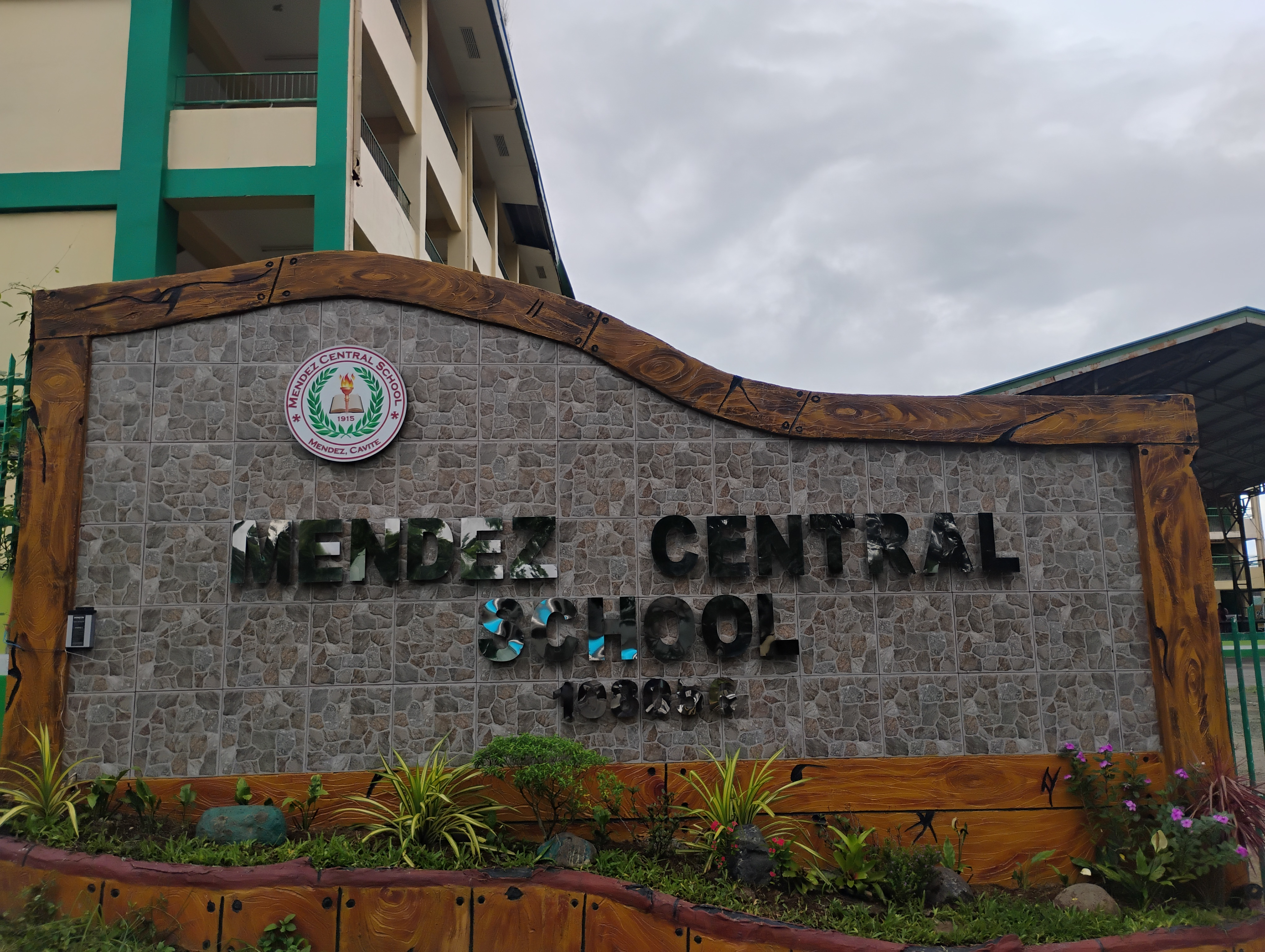
Mendez Central School

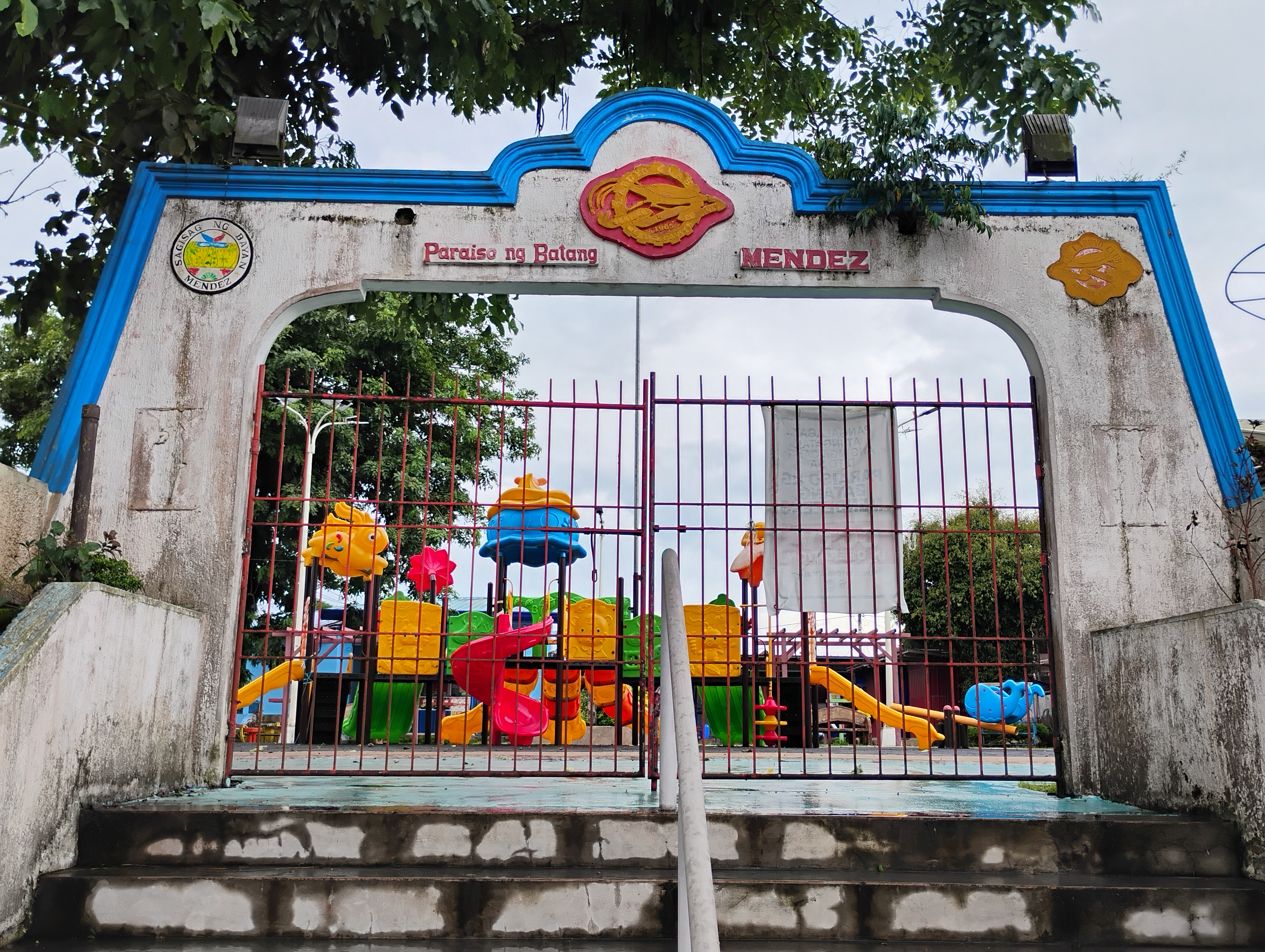
Paraiso ng Batang Mendez
