= 2010 Calabarzon local elections =

Local elections were held in Calabarzon on May 10, 2010, as part of the 2010 Philippine general election.

== Batangas ==
=== Governor ===
Incumbent Governor Vilma Santos of the Liberal Party won re-election to a second term.

Candidate	Party	Votes	%
Vilma Santos	Liberal Party	603,159	59.63
Edna Sanchez	Nacionalista Party	393,586	38.91
Marcos Mandanas Sr.	Independent	13,007	1.29
Gaudioso Platero	Independent	1,760	0.17
Total		1,011,512	100.00
Valid votes		1,011,512	94.43
Invalid/blank votes		59,707	5.57
Total votes		1,071,219	100.00
Liberal Party hold			
Source: Commission on Elections

=== Vice Governor ===
Incumbent Vice Governor Mark Leviste of the Liberal Party won re-election to a second term.

Candidate	Party	Votes	%
Mark Leviste	Liberal Party	668,744	71.60
Edwin Ermita	Lakas–Kampi–CMD	265,243	28.40
Total		933,987	100.00
Valid votes		933,987	87.19
Invalid/blank votes		137,232	12.81
Total votes		1,071,219	100.00
Liberal Party hold			
Source: Commission on Elections

=== Provincial Board ===
The Batangas Provincial Board is composed of 13 board members, 10 of whom are elected.

Party	Votes	%	Seats
Liberal Party	606,447	33.05	5
Lakas–Kampi–CMD	508,537	27.71	4
Nacionalista Party	418,040	22.78	1
Nationalist People's Coalition	202,882	11.06	0
PDP–Laban	36,695	2.00	0
Independent	62,337	3.40	0
Total	1,834,938	100.00	10
Total votes	1,071,219	–	
Source: Commission on Elections

==== 1st district ====
Candidate	Party	Votes	%
Lorenzo Bausas	Liberal Party	94,274	27.58
Roman Rosales	Lakas–Kampi–CMD	75,642	22.13
Rodolfo Salanguit	Nacionalista Party	65,035	19.02
Alexander Bonuan	Liberal Party	56,947	16.66
Arnel Salas	Lakas–Kampi–CMD	34,467	10.08
Horacio Alvarez	Independent	15,488	4.53
Total		341,853	100.00
Total votes		248,406	–
Source: Commission on Elections

==== 2nd district ====
Candidate	Party	Votes	%
Christopher de Leon	Liberal Party	149,231	29.29
Joel Atienza	Lakas–Kampi–CMD	119,197	23.39
Florencio de Loyola	Lakas–Kampi–CMD	94,536	18.55
Manuel Aclan	Lakas–Kampi–CMD	78,068	15.32
Julian Villena	Nacionalista Party	68,486	13.44
Total		509,518	100.00
Total votes		256,737	–
Source: Commission on Elections

==== 3rd district ====
Candidate	Party	Votes	%
Alfredo Corona	Lakas–Kampi–CMD	106,627	30.48
Divina Balba	Liberal Party	90,405	25.84
Simeon Platon	Nacionalista Party	83,190	23.78
Arturo Malijan	Independent	43,317	12.38
Edgar Runes	Nationalist People's Coalition	22,767	6.51
Ferdinand Topacio	Independent	3,532	1.01
Total		349,838	100.00
Total votes		266,558	–
Source: Commission on Elections

==== 4th district ====
Candidate	Party	Votes	%
Mabelle Virtusio	Liberal Party	108,223	17.08
Amado Carlos Bolilia	Liberal Party	107,367	16.94
Rowena Africa	Nacionalista Party	100,473	15.85
Aries Mendoza	Nationalist People's Coalition	100,308	15.83
Federico Caisip	Nacionalista Party	81,037	12.79
Leonilo Catipon	Nationalist People's Coalition	79,807	12.59
Abelardo Adaya	PDP–Laban	36,695	5.79
Robert Asa	Nacionalista Party	19,819	3.13
Total		633,729	100.00
Total votes		299,518	–
Source: Commission on Elections

== Cavite ==
=== Governor ===
Term-limited incumbent Governor Ayong Maliksi of the Liberal Party ran for the House of Representatives in Cavite's 3rd district. The Liberal Party nominated vice governor Dencito Campaña, who was defeated by former vice governor Jonvic Remulla of the Nacionalista Party.

Candidate	Party	Votes	%
Jonvic Remulla	Nacionalista Party	467,323	46.47
Dencito Campaña	Liberal Party	419,134	41.68
Melencio de Sagun Jr.	Pwersa ng Masang Pilipino	107,977	10.74
Angelita Tagle	Kilusang Bagong Lipunan	4,514	0.45
Bonifacio Ber Ado	Independent	4,189	0.42
Ma. Gloria Lebato	Independent	2,472	0.25
Total		1,005,609	100.00
Valid votes		1,005,609	90.44
Invalid/blank votes		106,253	9.56
Total votes		1,111,862	100.00
Nacionalista Party gain from Liberal Party			
Source: Commission on Elections

=== Vice Governor ===
Incumbent Vice Governor Dencito Campaña of the Liberal Party ran for Governor of Cavite. The Liberal Party nominated provincial board member Recto Cantimbuhan, who won the election.

Candidate	Party	Votes	%
Recto Cantimbuhan	Liberal Party	418,373	44.37
Bernard Michael Bautista	Nacionalista Party	261,247	27.71
Cesario del Rosario Jr.	Independent	130,799	13.87
Rogelio Pureza	Lakas–Kampi–CMD	92,767	9.84
Carlito Garcia	Independent	21,782	2.31
Domingo Alegre	Independent	11,025	1.17
Narciso Peji	Kilusang Bagong Lipunan	6,965	0.74
Total		942,958	100.00
Valid votes		942,958	84.81
Invalid/blank votes		168,904	15.19
Total votes		1,111,862	100.00
Liberal Party hold			
Source: Commission on Elections

=== Provincial Board ===
The Cavite Provincial Board is composed of 17 board members, 14 of whom are elected.

Party	Votes	%	Seats
Liberal Party	558,679	33.30	7
Nacionalista Party	481,735	28.71	3
Lakas–Kampi–CMD	364,197	21.71	3
Pwersa ng Masang Pilipino	128,496	7.66	0
Aksyon Demokratiko	59,162	3.53	1
Kilusang Bagong Lipunan	1,688	0.10	0
Independent	83,793	4.99	0
Total	1,677,750	100.00	14
Total votes	1,111,862	–	
Source: Commission on Elections

==== 1st district ====
Candidate	Party	Votes	%
Dino Carlo Chua	Nacionalista Party	67,907	31.35
Ryan Enriquez	Aksyon Demokratiko	59,162	27.31
Arnel Ricasata	Liberal Party	43,707	20.18
Leonides Arañas	Nacionalista Party	34,351	15.86
Marina Rieta	Pwersa ng Masang Pilipino	6,429	2.97
Cresenciano Pakingan	Pwersa ng Masang Pilipino	5,069	2.34
Total		216,625	100.00
Total votes		143,527	–
Source: Commission on Elections

==== 2nd district ====
Candidate	Party	Votes	%
Edwin Malvar	Liberal Party	70,469	31.03
Rolando Remulla	Nacionalista Party	63,519	27.97
Luis Pagtakhan	Liberal Party	50,882	22.40
Miguel Bautista	Lakas–Kampi–CMD	38,102	16.78
Aristarco Navarrete	Pwersa ng Masang Pilipino	4,134	1.82
Total		227,106	100.00
Total votes		150,554	–
Source: Commission on Elections

==== 3rd district ====
Candidate	Party	Votes	%
Larry Boy Nato	Liberal Party	46,603	31.73
Rodrigo Arguelles Sr.	Liberal Party	45,975	31.30
Chemilou Patricia Jamir	Nacionalista Party	29,204	19.88
Rodney Reyes	Nacionalista Party	18,671	12.71
Reynaldo Hayag	Pwersa ng Masang Pilipino	2,999	2.04
Lucius Minaldo	Independent	1,233	0.84
Rolando Cotoner	Independent	1,137	0.77
Ronnie Cebu	Independent	1,067	0.73
Total		146,889	100.00
Total votes		93,309	–
Source: Commission on Elections

==== 4th district ====
Candidate	Party	Votes	%
Raul Rex Mangubat	Lakas–Kampi–CMD	93,597	32.39
Teofilo Lara	Lakas–Kampi–CMD	88,489	30.62
Miguelito Ilano	Independent	33,629	11.64
Luisito Bautista	Nacionalista Party	31,088	10.76
Arnel del Rosario	Nacionalista Party	20,011	6.92
Roden Carungcong	Independent	17,689	6.12
Nelson Orejana	Independent	2,398	0.83
Romeo Corbes	Independent	2,074	0.72
Total		288,975	100.00
Total votes		189,243	–
Source: Commission on Elections

==== 5th district ====
Candidate	Party	Votes	%
Marcos Amutan	Lakas–Kampi–CMD	59,780	24.21
Aristides Jose Velazco	Liberal Party	52,470	21.25
Ferdinand Belamide	Nacionalista Party	50,053	20.27
Walter Echevarria Jr.	Lakas–Kampi–CMD	49,074	19.87
Gerald Medina	Pwersa ng Masang Pilipino	27,926	11.31
Edwin Barbudo	Pwersa ng Masang Pilipino	7,665	3.10
Total		246,968	100.00
Total votes		161,527	–
Source: Commission on Elections

==== 6th district ====
Candidate	Party	Votes	%
Hermogenes Arayata III	Liberal Party	84,610	29.96
Albert Ambagan Jr.	Liberal Party	60,402	21.38
Romeo de Sagun	Pwersa ng Masang Pilipino	46,364	16.41
Timiel Mintu	Nacionalista Party	34,393	12.18
Rene Tongson	Nacionalista Party	26,003	9.21
Roberto Tica Jr.	Pwersa ng Masang Pilipino	22,691	8.03
Carlos Viniegra II	Independent	4,282	1.52
Madeline Duckert	Independent	2,018	0.71
Erlinda Temelo	Kilusang Bagong Lipunan	1,688	0.60
Total		282,451	100.00
Total votes		186,205	–
Source: Commission on Elections

==== 7th district ====
Candidate	Party	Votes	%
Virgilio Ambion	Liberal Party	64,601	24.04
Irene Bencito	Nacionalista Party	59,427	22.11
Ferdinand Wakay	Nacionalista Party	47,108	17.53
Romeo Mendoza	Liberal Party	38,960	14.50
Jose Marcel Panlilio	Lakas–Kampi–CMD	35,155	13.08
Norman Versoza	Independent	18,266	6.80
Jualinio Abutin	Pwersa ng Masang Pilipino	5,219	1.94
Total		268,736	100.00
Total votes		187,497	–
Source: Commission on Elections

== Laguna ==
=== Governor ===
Incumbent Governor Teresita Lazaro of Lakas–Kampi–CMD was term-limited. Lakas–Kampi–CMD nominated Lazaro's son, provincial administrator Dennis Lazaro, who was defeated by Pagsanjan mayor E. R. Ejercito of Pwersa ng Masang Pilipino.

Candidate	Party	Votes	%
E.R. Ejercito	Pwersa ng Masang Pilipino	334,530	34.88
Dennis Lazaro	Lakas–Kampi–CMD	260,440	27.16
Joey Lina	Liberal Party	234,473	24.45
Ramil Hernandez	Nacionalista Party	123,670	12.89
Christine Amador	Independent	3,634	0.38
Randy Bautista	Independent	2,311	0.24
Total		959,058	100.00
Valid votes		959,058	91.26
Invalid/blank votes		91,832	8.74
Total votes		1,050,890	100.00
Pwersa ng Masang Pilipino gain from Lakas–Kampi–CMD			
Source: Commission on Elections

=== Vice Governor ===
Incumbent Vice Governor Ramil Hernandez of the Nacionalista Party ran for Governor of Laguna. The Nacionalista Party nominated provincial board member Dave Almarinez, who was defeated by Los Baños mayor Caesar Perez of Bigkis Pinoy.

Candidate	Party	Votes	%
Caesar Perez	Bigkis Pinoy	253,818	29.05
Dave Almarinez	Nacionalista Party	201,040	23.01
Celso Mercado	Liberal Party	179,878	20.59
Eleanor Reyes	Pwersa ng Masang Pilipino	156,623	17.93
Abner Afuang	Independent	67,881	7.77
Bernardita Cruz	Independent	14,372	1.65
Total		873,612	100.00
Valid votes		873,612	83.13
Invalid/blank votes		177,278	16.87
Total votes		1,050,890	100.00
Bigkis Pinoy gain from Nacionalista Party			
Source: Commission on Elections

=== Provincial Board ===
The Laguna Provincial Board is composed of 13 board members, 10 of whom are elected.

Party	Votes	%	Seats
Lakas–Kampi–CMD	727,283	36.65	6
Liberal Party	494,610	24.93	2
Nacionalista Party	457,986	23.08	2
Pwersa ng Masang Pilipino	82,792	4.17	0
Nationalist People's Coalition	82,753	4.17	0
Kilusang Bagong Lipunan	19,594	0.99	0
Independent	119,303	6.01	0
Total	1,984,321	100.00	10
Total votes	1,050,890	–	
Source: Commission on Elections

==== 1st district ====
Candidate	Party	Votes	%
Carlo Almoro	Lakas–Kampi–CMD	133,741	19.66
Gabnulang Alatiit	Liberal Party	98,594	14.49
Emilio Tiongco	Lakas–Kampi–CMD	94,868	13.94
Cesar Areza	Nacionalista Party	93,877	13.80
Ramon Carrillo	Lakas–Kampi–CMD	76,725	11.28
Marlon Acierto	Liberal Party	68,828	10.12
Magtangol Jose Carait Jr.	Nacionalista Party	65,321	9.60
Hermenegildo Sotto	Kilusang Bagong Lipunan	19,594	2.88
Rio Cañeda	Independent	14,887	2.19
Lamberto Andal	Pwersa ng Masang Pilipino	7,613	1.12
Edwin Elyhiyo Frenz Panelo	Independent	6,257	0.92
Total		680,305	100.00
Total votes		304,937	–
Source: Commission on Elections

==== 2nd district ====
Candidate	Party	Votes	%
Neptali Bagnes	Nacionalista Party	113,617	17.70
Juan Unico	Lakas–Kampi–CMD	98,466	15.34
Neil Andrew Nocon	Lakas–Kampi–CMD	84,518	13.17
Guillermo Belarmino Jr.	Lakas–Kampi–CMD	76,170	11.87
Jose Benson Aguillo	Liberal Party	74,994	11.68
Susano Tapia	Nacionalista Party	72,063	11.23
Hermogenes Miranda	Liberal Party	39,850	6.21
Edgar Llarena	Pwersa ng Masang Pilipino	20,302	3.16
Ronald Cardema	Independent	20,015	3.12
Delfin Ebron Jr.	Pwersa ng Masang Pilipino	16,719	2.60
Gregorio Manuel	Pwersa ng Masang Pilipino	13,512	2.11
Armando Velasco	Independent	11,614	1.81
Total		641,840	100.00
Total votes		300,514	–
Source: Commission on Elections

==== 3rd district ====
Candidate	Party	Votes	%
Reynaldo Paras	Lakas–Kampi–CMD	70,952	22.22
Angelica Jones	Nacionalista Party	68,305	21.40
Diosdado Biglete	Nacionalista Party	44,803	14.03
Herbert Ticzon	Liberal Party	42,963	13.46
Michael Anthony Potenciano	Independent	31,149	9.76
Mirabo Bueser	Independent	26,305	8.24
William Duldulao	Nationalist People's Coalition	22,546	7.06
Rommel Maghirang	Independent	7,573	2.37
Giovanni Dumaraos	Lakas–Kampi–CMD	4,653	1.46
Total		319,249	100.00
Total votes		211,486	–
Source: Commission on Elections

==== 4th district ====
Candidate	Party	Votes	%
Benjo Agarao	Liberal Party	107,940	31.48
Benedicto Palacol	Lakas–Kampi–CMD	87,190	25.43
Leilani Fernandez-Macalalag	Liberal Party	61,441	17.92
Felix Flores	Nationalist People's Coalition	60,207	17.56
Virgilio Lizo	Pwersa ng Masang Pilipino	14,004	4.08
Gener Dimaranan	Pwersa ng Masang Pilipino	10,642	3.10
Danilo Alon	Independent	1,503	0.44
Total		342,927	100.00
Total votes		233,953	–
Source: Commission on Elections

== Lucena ==
=== Mayor ===
Incumbent Mayor Ramon Talaga Jr. of Lakas–Kampi–CMD initially ran for re-election for another term, but was later declared by the Commission on Elections to be term-limited. Lakas–Kampi–CMD substituted Talaga with his wife, Barbara Ruby Talaga, who won the election.

Candidate	Party	Votes	%
Barbara Ruby Talaga	Lakas–Kampi–CMD	44,099	51.12
Philip Castillo	Liberal Party	39,615	45.92
Simon Aldovino	Lapiang Manggagawa	2,375	2.75
Edna Seralde	Independent	99	0.11
Romeo Amposta	Independent	74	0.09
Total		86,262	100.00
Valid votes		86,262	96.67
Invalid/blank votes		2,967	3.33
Total votes		89,229	100.00
Lakas–Kampi–CMD hold			
Source: Commission on Elections

=== Vice Mayor ===
Incumbent Vice Mayor Philip Castillo of the Liberal Party ran for Mayor of Lucena. The Liberal Party nominated city councilor Roderick Alcala, who won the election.

Candidate	Party	Votes	%
Roderick Alcala	Liberal Party	46,175	54.49
Clarinda Cabana	Nacionalista Party	37,553	44.31
German Alemania	Independent	742	0.88
Francisco Tan	Independent	277	0.33
Total		84,747	100.00
Valid votes		84,747	94.98
Invalid/blank votes		4,482	5.02
Total votes		89,229	100.00
Liberal Party hold			
Source: Commission on Elections

=== City Council ===
The Lucena City Council is composed of 12 councilors, 10 of whom are elected.

Party	Votes	%	Seats
Liberal Party	270,946	40.13	3
Nacionalista Party	175,068	25.93	3
Lakas–Kampi–CMD	168,827	25.00	4
Lapiang Manggagawa	32,845	4.86	0
Independent	27,568	4.08	0
Total	675,254	100.00	10
Total votes	89,229	–	
Source: Commission on Elections

Candidate	Party	Votes	%
Ramil Talaga	Nacionalista Party	51,967	7.70
Danilo Faller	Liberal Party	44,877	6.65
Americo Lacerna	Nacionalista Party	40,179	5.95
Michael Dalida	Lakas–Kampi–CMD	39,790	5.89
William Noche	Lakas–Kampi–CMD	38,632	5.72
Danilo Zaballero	Liberal Party	35,750	5.29
Wilfredo Asilo	Lakas–Kampi–CMD	35,163	5.21
Felix Avillo	Nacionalista Party	35,133	5.20
Rey Oliver Alejandrino	Liberal Party	32,772	4.85
Romeo Maaño	Lakas–Kampi–CMD	32,231	4.77
Nicanor Pedro Jr.	Liberal Party	30,810	4.56
Gilbert Marquez	Nacionalista Party	29,114	4.31
Jose Asensi Jr.	Liberal Party	27,718	4.10
John Bunyan Calamigan III	Liberal Party	25,081	3.71
Richard Zaballero	Lakas–Kampi–CMD	23,011	3.41
Arnel Avila	Liberal Party	22,267	3.30
Victor Paulo	Liberal Party	22,132	3.28
Zoroaster Libozada	Nacionalista Party	18,675	2.77
Armelito Robles	Liberal Party	16,419	2.43
Darius Guerrero	Liberal Party	13,120	1.94
John Eddison Sy Bang	Independent	12,555	1.86
Adonis Bibit	Lapiang Manggagawa	8,322	1.23
Nilo Sadia	Lapiang Manggagawa	7,567	1.12
Harry Valera Sr.	Independent	7,079	1.05
Numeriano Ranido	Lapiang Manggagawa	5,808	0.86
Romulo Lagar	Lapiang Manggagawa	5,546	0.82
Benjamin Antioquia	Lapiang Manggagawa	2,906	0.43
Jorge Minorca	Lapiang Manggagawa	2,696	0.40
Florencio Rodillas	Independent	2,405	0.36
Ariel Endrenal	Independent	2,211	0.33
Erik Dio	Independent	1,876	0.28
Uliran Delvo	Independent	1,442	0.21
Total		675,254	100.00
Total votes		89,229	–
Source: Commission on Elections

== Quezon ==
=== Governor ===
Incumbent Governor Rafael Nantes of the Liberal Party ran for re-election to a second term, but was defeated by former vice governor David Suarez of Lakas–Kampi–CMD.

Candidate	Party	Votes	%
David Suarez	Lakas–Kampi–CMD	397,858	53.84
Rafael Nantes	Liberal Party	333,292	45.11
Rolando Rafa	Independent	2,532	0.34
Hobart Dator Jr.	Independent	2,459	0.33
Eduardo Cuenca	Philippine Green Republican Party	1,218	0.16
Buenaventura Pumarega	Independent	853	0.12
Gleceria Santa Maria	Independent	695	0.09
Total		738,907	100.00
Valid votes		738,907	92.88
Invalid/blank votes		56,627	7.12
Total votes		795,534	100.00
Lakas–Kampi–CMD gain from Liberal Party			
Source: Commission on Elections

=== Vice Governor ===
Incumbent Vice Governor Carlos Portes of the Liberal Party ran for re-election to a second term, but was defeated by provincial board member Vicente Alcala, who ran as an independent.

Candidate	Party	Votes	%
Vicente Alcala	Independent	383,867	56.58
Carlos Portes	Liberal Party	289,643	42.69
Florencio Laspinas Sr.	Independent	4,978	0.73
Total		678,488	100.00
Valid votes		678,488	85.29
Invalid/blank votes		117,046	14.71
Total votes		795,534	100.00
Independent gain from Liberal Party			
Source: Commission on Elections

=== Provincial Board ===
The Quezon Provincial Board is composed of 14 board members, 10 of whom are elected.

Party	Votes	%	Seats
Liberal Party	823,660	57.07	7
Lakas–Kampi–CMD	190,350	13.19	1
Nacionalista Party	144,450	10.01	1
PDP–Laban	140,416	9.73	1
Nationalist People's Coalition	37,993	2.63	0
Pwersa ng Masang Pilipino	17,453	1.21	0
Independent	89,003	6.17	0
Total	1,443,325	100.00	10
Total votes	795,534	–	
Source: Commission on Elections

==== 1st district ====
Candidate	Party	Votes	%
Teresita Dator	Liberal Party	90,137	30.26
Alona Obispo	Liberal Party	89,691	30.11
Noel Angelo Devanadera	Lakas–Kampi–CMD	80,628	27.07
Evelyn Abeja	Nacionalista Party	26,933	9.04
Rustico Laurel	Independent	6,329	2.12
Ma. Janet Buelo	Lakas–Kampi–CMD	2,512	0.84
Elmer Litana	Independent	1,636	0.55
Total		297,866	100.00
Total votes		210,377	–
Source: Commission on Elections

==== 2nd district ====
Candidate	Party	Votes	%
Romano Franco Talaga	PDP–Laban	135,416	24.19
Gary Jason Ejercito	Liberal Party	125,510	22.42
Ferdinand Talabong	Liberal Party	120,276	21.48
Antonio Añano Punzalan	Liberal Party	99,758	17.82
Liza Alvarez	Independent	53,436	9.54
Jose Ona Jr.	Pwersa ng Masang Pilipino	17,453	3.12
Artemio Garcia	Independent	4,911	0.88
Reynieto Anareta	Independent	1,659	0.30
Nelson Traquena	Independent	1,487	0.27
Total		559,906	100.00
Total votes		252,470	–
Source: Commission on Elections

==== 3rd district ====
Candidate	Party	Votes	%
Lourdes Pasatiempo-de Luna	Lakas–Kampi–CMD	77,076	38.54
Victor Reyes	Nacionalista Party	47,262	23.63
Dominador Villena	Lakas–Kampi–CMD	30,134	15.07
Federico Aguilar	Liberal Party	20,600	10.30
Reynante Arrogancia	Liberal Party	13,941	6.97
Jose Pasia	Independent	7,299	3.65
Virgilio Fernandez	PDP–Laban	3,661	1.83
Total		199,973	100.00
Total votes		158,063	–
Source: Commission on Elections

==== 4th district ====
Candidate	Party	Votes	%
Manuel Butardo	Liberal Party	69,101	17.92
Gerald Ortiz	Liberal Party	60,354	15.65
Rachel Ubana	Liberal Party	53,591	13.90
Rhodora Tan	Liberal Party	52,374	13.58
Narciso Malite	Nacionalista Party	51,054	13.24
Carmela Josefa Lavides	Liberal Party	28,327	7.35
Maria Teresa Diestro	Nationalist People's Coalition	21,588	5.60
Francis Jose Rodelas	Nacionalista Party	19,201	4.98
Fidencio Salumbides	Nationalist People's Coalition	16,405	4.25
Emmanuel Mapaye	Independent	5,214	1.35
Damian Guerrero	Independent	3,354	0.87
Nelson Barreto	Independent	2,702	0.70
Marcil Guay	PDP–Laban	1,339	0.35
Jose Cereza Jr.	Independent	976	0.25
Total		385,580	100.00
Total votes		174,624	–
Source: Commission on Elections

== Rizal ==
=== Governor ===
Incumbent Governor Casimiro Ynares III of the Nationalist People's Coalition won re-election to a second term.

Candidate	Party	Votes	%
Casimiro Ynares III	Nationalist People's Coalition	575,296	73.05
Pedro Cuerpo	Aksyon Demokratiko	190,532	24.19
Rosita Lacson	Independent	10,843	1.38
Wilfredo Torres	Kilusang Bagong Lipunan	5,050	0.64
Anicio Escosura	Independent	2,012	0.26
Rex Darwin Tiongson	Independent	1,965	0.25
Milagros Tumimbang	Independent	1,884	0.24
Total		787,582	100.00
Valid votes		787,582	91.41
Invalid/blank votes		74,031	8.59
Total votes		861,613	100.00
Nationalist People's Coalition hold			
Source: Commission on Elections

=== Vice Governor ===
Incumbent Vice Governor Frisco San Juan Jr. of the Nationalist People's Coalition won re-election to a second term.

Candidate	Party	Votes	%
Frisco San Juan Jr.	Nationalist People's Coalition	400,534	58.61
Esteban Salonga	Liberal Party	249,915	36.57
Fernando Dizon	Kilusang Bagong Lipunan	32,965	4.82
Total		683,414	100.00
Valid votes		683,414	79.32
Invalid/blank votes		178,199	20.68
Total votes		861,613	100.00
Nationalist People's Coalition hold			
Source: Commission on Elections

=== Provincial Board ===
The Rizal Provincial Board is composed of 13 board members, 10 of whom are elected.

Party	Votes	%	Seats
Liberal Party	805,184	43.19	4
Nationalist People's Coalition	561,438	30.12	5
Aksyon Demokratiko	249,341	13.37	0
Lakas–Kampi–CMD	78,695	4.22	1
Independent	169,636	9.10	0
Total	1,864,294	100.00	10
Total votes	861,613	–	
Source: Commission on Elections

==== 1st district ====
Candidate	Party	Votes	%
Benjamin Esguerra	Liberal Party	153,059	18.44
Genato Bernardo	Nationalist People's Coalition	131,048	15.79
Zoilo Tolentino	Nationalist People's Coalition	127,557	15.37
Armando Villamaayor Sr.	Liberal Party	123,249	14.85
Diosdado Ibanez	Liberal Party	79,565	9.59
Aser Ram	Aksyon Demokratiko	53,103	6.40
Jeffrey Santos	Independent	50,638	6.10
Reynaldo Combe	Liberal Party	49,822	6.00
Domingo Perez II	Aksyon Demokratiko	37,624	4.53
Edibon Lisondra	Independent	12,194	1.47
Joel Pontawe	Independent	11,968	1.44
Total		829,827	100.00
Total votes		313,962	–
Source: Commission on Elections

==== 2nd district ====
Candidate	Party	Votes	%
Dino Tanjuatco	Liberal Party	171,917	20.15
Nemesio Roxas	Nationalist People's Coalition	131,760	15.44
Reynaldo San Juan Jr.	Liberal Party	129,395	15.17
Arwin Mariano	Nationalist People's Coalition	107,487	12.60
Luis Catolos	Liberal Party	79,035	9.26
Aileen Fernandez	Aksyon Demokratiko	76,683	8.99
Salvador Simbulan Sr.	Aksyon Demokratiko	46,535	5.45
Juan Ponce	Independent	36,698	4.30
Rodolfo Teope	Aksyon Demokratiko	35,396	4.15
Francisco Medina Jr.	Independent	24,456	2.87
Nestor Karim	Independent	7,315	0.86
Roberto Sepulveda	Independent	6,482	0.76
Total		853,159	100.00
Total votes		319,089	–
Source: Commission on Elections

==== Antipolo's 1st district ====
Candidate	Party	Votes	%
Ronald Barcena	Nationalist People's Coalition	33,975	34.50
Agripino Garcia	Lakas–Kampi–CMD	28,704	29.15
Enrico de Guzman	Liberal Party	19,142	19.44
Federico Zapanta	Independent	15,906	16.15
Jacinto Canales	Independent	749	0.76
Total		98,476	100.00
Valid votes		98,476	83.32
Invalid/blank votes		19,720	16.68
Total votes		118,196	100.00
Source: Commission on Elections

==== Antipolo's 2nd district ====
Candidate	Party	Votes	%
Jesus Angelito Huertas Jr.	Lakas–Kampi–CMD	49,991	60.35
German Mata	Nationalist People's Coalition	29,611	35.75
Nelia Bulanon	Independent	3,230	3.90
Total		82,832	100.00
Valid votes		82,832	75.05
Invalid/blank votes		27,534	24.95
Total votes		110,366	100.00
Source: Commission on Elections
