= Mayor of Dasmariñas =

Local chief executive of Dasmariñas, Cavite

- Punong Lungsod ng Dasmariñas
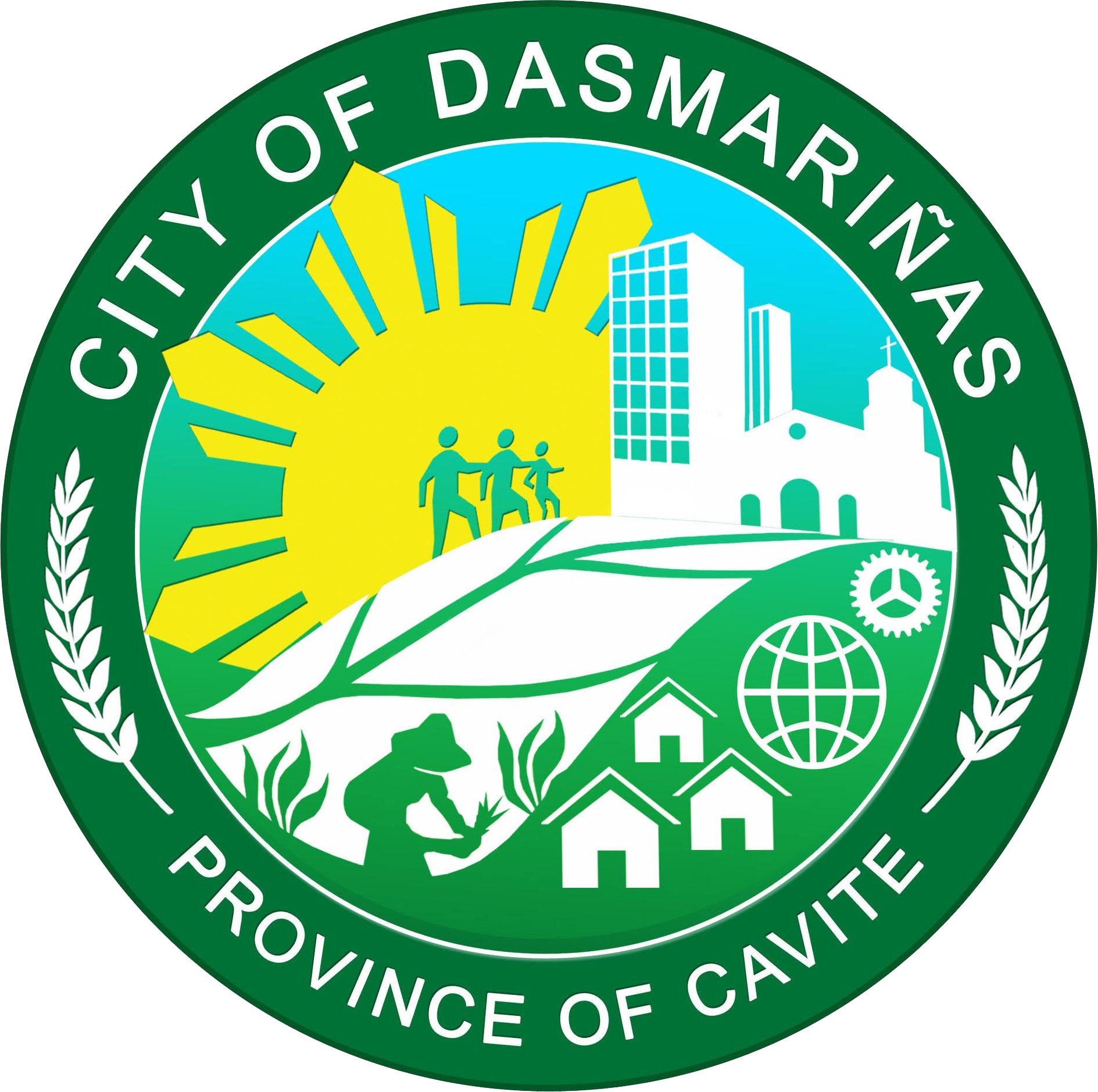
- Seal of the City of Dasmariñas
- Incumbent; Third Barzaga since September 1, 2026
- Style: The Honorable (formal)
- Seat: City of Dasmariñas Socio-Economic Building (New City Hall), Burol Main
- Appointer: Elected via popular vote
- Term length: 3 years
- Inaugural holder: Juan Ramirez (as Gobernadorcillo); Placido Campos (as Capitán Municipal); Francisco Barzaga (as Municipal President); Arturo Carungcong (as Municipal Mayor); Jenny Barzaga (as City Mayor)
- Formation: 1868 (as Gobernadorcillo); 1896 (as Capitán Municipal); 1900 (as Municipal President); 1948 (as Municipal Mayor); 2009 (as City Mayor)
- Website: cityofdasmarinas.gov.ph/mayors-corner/

The mayor of Dasmariñas (Filipino: Punong Lungsod ng Dasmariñas) is the head of the executive branch of the city government of Dasmariñas, Cavite.

The current mayor is Third Barzaga, who has served since September 1, 2026. He succeeded his mother, Jenny, after she assumed office as representative of Cavite's 4th congressional district in September 2026, following her victory in the special election held on August 29.

== History ==
In 1896, Placido Campos was appointed capitán municipal of Pérez-Dasmariñas. At the start of the American military administration, municipal elections were called under General Orders No. 40, issued in March 1900, providing for the election of new alcaldes (mayors), municipal lieutenants, and councilors, with Francisco Barzaga becoming the town's first municipal president. Campos was later elected municipal president in 1901 following the establishment of the civil government, which called for another election. Pérez-Dasmariñas was merged with the municipalities of Imus and Bacoor in 1903 under Act No. 947, with Imus serving as the seat of government, where Cesar Fontanilla was elected as the first municipal president. The town regained its status as a separate municipality in 1917, when it was renamed simply Dasmariñas, and Campos won a third term as municipal president.

During World War II, Felicisimo M. Carungcong served as the wartime municipal president while his father, Commonwealth era municipal president Colonel Estanislao Mangubat Carungcong of the 4th Infantry Regiment Fil- American Cavite Guerilla Forces (FACGF), spearheaded the guerilla operations and liberation of Dasmariñas in January 30, 1945.

Upon the inauguration of the Third Philippine Republic in 1946, President Manuel Roxas appointed Maximo de la Torre as municipal president. In 1948, Arturo Sayoto Carungcong was elected as the town's first municipal mayor, and all subsequent officeholders have held the title ever since. Remigio Carungcong served as the last municipal mayor of the Third Republic until the declaration of the martial law in 1972. Narciso Guevarra, the vice mayor of Remigio Carungcong, served as the new mayor of Dasmariñas during martial law and the early Fourth Republic, until his death in 1982, when he was succeeded by Vice Mayor Recto Cantimbuhan. After the 1986 People Power Revolution that ousted Ferdinand Marcos, newly installed President Corazon Aquino appointed Elpidio "Pidi" Barzaga Jr. officer-in-charge of the office of mayor.

The first local elections under the 1987 Constitution, held in January 1988, resulted in Recto Cantimbuhan's election as mayor. He served three successive terms until 1998. Barzaga Jr., who lost to Cantimbuhan in 1992, had been the campaign manager of Recto Cantimbuhan's vice mayor Lauro "Larry" T. Carungcong, who ran for mayor in 1995 but died unexpectedly during the campaign. His death paved the way for Barzaga Jr. to run for Mayor in 1998 by absorbing Carungcong's grieving political base and fielding Luciano S. Cantimbuhan as his vice mayor against Veronica J. "Meny" Cantimbuhan, whom he defeated, marking the beginning of the Barzaga family's hold on the office for nearly 30 years. This followed the split and absorption of the Cantimbuhan–Carungcong tandem by Barzaga Jr. that had dominated Dasmariñas local politics. He served as mayor for nine years until 2007, when he ran for the House of Representatives, and his wife, Jenny, was elected as the town's first female mayor.

In 2009, Dasmariñas became a city, making Jenny Barzaga its first city mayor. She served for nine years before running for the House of Representatives in 2016, switching positions with her husband, Pidi, who successfully ran for mayor and served one term. In 2019, Jenny Barzaga won a fourth term as mayor and was re-elected in 2022. In 2025, she was challenged by former vice mayor Valeriano Encabo, who had served under her administration, and defeated him. She announced her candidacy for Cavite's 4th congressional district in the House of Representatives on July 17, 2026, after her son, Kiko, was expelled from the House earlier that June. Jenny Barzaga won the election, gaining 201,893 of the 258,361 votes cast. She was succeeded by her other son, incumbent vice mayor Third Barzaga.

== List of mayors ==
=== Gobernadorcillos of Pérez Dasmariñas (1868–1896) ===
- Juan Ramirez
- Adriano Llano
- Eduardo Bautista
- Anastacio Paulme
- Valeriano Campos
- Eugenio Ambalada
- Ligario Malihan
- Leon Mangubat
- Lino Alcantara
- Fausto Bautista
- Gregorio Baustista

=== Capitán municipal of Pérez Dasmariñas (1896–1899) ===
Portrait	Name (lifespan)	Term	Party	Election	Era
	Placido Campos (1867–1938)	1896 – 1899	Unaffiliated	— (Note: Appointed.)	Captaincy General

=== Municipal presidents of Pérez Dasmariñas (1900–1917) and Dasmariñas (1917–1948) ===
Portrait	Name (lifespan)	Term	Party	Election	Vice president (Note: Equivalent to the modern-day position of vice mayor.)	Era
	Francisco E. Barzaga (1873–1971)	1900 – 1901	Unaffiliated	1900	Conrado Malijan	U.S. Military; Government
	Placido Campos (1867–1938)	1901 – 1904	Unaffiliated	1901	Domingo Mallari	U.S. Military; Government
	Placido Campos (1867–1938)	1901 – 1904	Unaffiliated	1901	Domingo Mallari	U.S. Insular; Government
	Cesar Fontanilla	1905 – 1912	Unknown	1905	Unknown	U.S. Insular; Government
	Felipe Topacio	1912 – 1915	Unknown	1912	Unknown	U.S. Insular; Government
	Cecilio Kamantigue	1915 – 1916	Unknown	—	Unknown	U.S. Insular; Government
	Placido Campos (1867–1938)	1917 – 1919	Nacionalista	1917	Unknown	U.S. Insular; Government
	Felipe Tirona	1919 – 1922	Unknown	1919	Felix Francisco	U.S. Insular; Government
	Francisco E. Barzaga (1873–1971)	1922 – 1925	Unknown	1922	Estanislao Carungcong Teodorico Sarosario	U.S. Insular; Government
	Isidro Mangubat	1925 – 1928	Unknown	1925	Estanislao Carungcong Teodorico Sarosario	U.S. Insular; Government
	Emilio Ramirez	1928 – 1931	Unknown	1928	Estanislao Carungcong Teodorico Sarosario	U.S. Insular; Government
	Estanislao Carungcong	1931 – 1934	Unknown	1931	Estanislao Carungcong Teodorico Sarosario	U.S. Insular; Government
	Doroteo Mangubat	1934 – 1937	Unknown	1934	Estanislao Carungcong Teodorico Sarosario	U.S. Insular; Government
	Doroteo Mangubat	1934 – 1937	Unknown	1934	Estanislao Carungcong Teodorico Sarosario	Commonwealth
	Teodorico Sarosario	1938 – 1941	Unknown	1937	Isidro Mangubat	Commonwealth
	Felicisimo Carungcong	1941 – 1945	Unknown	1941	Isidro Mangubat	Commonwealth
	Felicisimo Carungcong	1941 – 1945	KALIBAPI	— (Note: Appointed by President Jose P. Laurel.)	Isidro Mangubat	Second Republic
	Felicisimo Carungcong	1941 – 1945	Unknown	— (Note: Appointed by President Sergio Osmeña.)	Isidro Mangubat	Commonwealth
	Maximo de la Torre	June 10, 1946 – c. 1946	Unknown	— (Note: Appointed by President Manuel Roxas.)	Isidro Mangubat	Commonwealth
	Maximo de la Torre	June 10, 1946 – c. 1946	Unknown	—	Isidro Mangubat	Third Republic
	Gaudencio Geda	1946 – 1947	Unknown	—	Isidro Mangubat	Third Republic
	Fermin de la Cruz	1947	Unknown	—	Isidro Mangubat	Third Republic

=== Municipal Mayors of Dasmariñas (1948–2009) ===
Portrait	Name (lifespan)	Term	Party	Election	Vice mayor	Era
	Arturo Carungcong	1948 – 1951	Liberal	1948	Unknown	Third Republic
	Emiliano de la Cruz	1951 – 1955	Unknown	1951	Unknown	Third Republic
	Tomas Hembrador	1956 – 1963	Unknown	1955	Unknown	Third Republic
	Tomas Hembrador	1956 – 1963	Unknown	1959	Unknown	Third Republic
	Remigio Carungcong	1964 – 1971	Liberal	1963	Florentino Geda	Third Republic
	Remigio Carungcong	1964 – 1971	Liberal	1967	Narcisso Guevarra	Third Republic
	Narciso Guevarra (d. 1982)	1972 – December 17, 1982	Nacionalista	1971	Unknown	Third Republic
	Narciso Guevarra (d. 1982)	1972 – December 17, 1982	KBL	— (Note: Appointed by President Ferdinand Marcos.)	Unknown	Martial law
	Narciso Guevarra (d. 1982)	1972 – December 17, 1982	KBL	1980	Unknown	Martial law
	Narciso Guevarra (d. 1982)	1972 – December 17, 1982	KBL	1980	Unknown	Fourth Republic
	Recto Cantimbuhan (born 1950)	1982 – 1986	KBL	—	Unknown	Fourth Republic
	Elpidio Barzaga Jr. (1950–2024)	May 17, 1986 – March 27, 1987	Unknown	— (Note: Appointed by President Corazon Aquino.)	Unknown	Provisional; Government
	Elpidio Barzaga Jr. (1950–2024)	May 17, 1986 – March 27, 1987	Unknown	—	Unknown	Fifth Republic
	Mariano Veluz (1931–2017)	March 28, 1987 – December 1, 1987	Unknown	—	Unknown	Fifth Republic
	Roberto Cantimbuhan	December 2, 1987 – January 22, 1988	Unknown	—	Unknown	Fifth Republic
	Recto Cantimbuhan (born 1950)	February 2, 1988 – June 30, 1998	Unknown	1988	Lauro Carungcong	Fifth Republic
	Recto Cantimbuhan (born 1950)	February 2, 1988 – June 30, 1998	LDP	1992	Lauro Carungcong	Fifth Republic
	Recto Cantimbuhan (born 1950)	February 2, 1988 – June 30, 1998	Unknown	1995	Unknown	Fifth Republic
	Elpidio Barzaga Jr. (1950–2024)	June 30, 1998 – June 30, 2007	Independent	1998	Luciano Cantimbuhan	Fifth Republic
	Elpidio Barzaga Jr. (1950–2024)	June 30, 1998 – June 30, 2007	Lakas	2001	Luciano Cantimbuhan	Fifth Republic
	Elpidio Barzaga Jr. (1950–2024)	June 30, 1998 – June 30, 2007	PMP	2004	Victor Carungcong	Fifth Republic
	Jenny Barzaga (born 1975)	June 30, 2007 – November 24, 2009	KAMPI	2007	Valeriano Encabo	Fifth Republic

=== City mayors of Dasmariñas (2009–present) ===
Portrait	Name (lifespan)	Term	Party	Election	Vice mayor	Era
	Jenny Barzaga (born 1975)	November 25, 2009 – June 30, 2016	KAMPI	2007	Valeriano Encabo	Fifth Republic
	Jenny Barzaga (born 1975)	November 25, 2009 – June 30, 2016	Lakas (until 2011)	2010	Valeriano Encabo	Fifth Republic
	Jenny Barzaga (born 1975)	November 25, 2009 – June 30, 2016	NUP (from 2011)	2010	Valeriano Encabo	Fifth Republic
	Jenny Barzaga (born 1975)	November 25, 2009 – June 30, 2016	NUP (from 2011)	2013	Valeriano Encabo	Fifth Republic
	Elpidio Barzaga Jr. (1950–2024)	June 30, 2016 – June 30, 2019	NUP	2016	Rex Mangubat	Fifth Republic
	Jenny Barzaga (born 1975)	June 30, 2019 – September 1, 2026	NUP	2019	Rex Mangubat	Fifth Republic
	Jenny Barzaga (born 1975)	June 30, 2019 – September 1, 2026	NUP	2022	Rex Mangubat	Fifth Republic
	Jenny Barzaga (born 1975)	June 30, 2019 – September 1, 2026	NUP	2025	Third Barzaga	Fifth Republic
	Third Barzaga (born 2000)	September 1, 2026 – present	NUP	—	Rudy Lara	Fifth Republic

== Vice mayor of Dasmariñas ==
Vice Mayor of Dasmariñas
- Pangalawang Punong Lungsod ng Dasmariñas
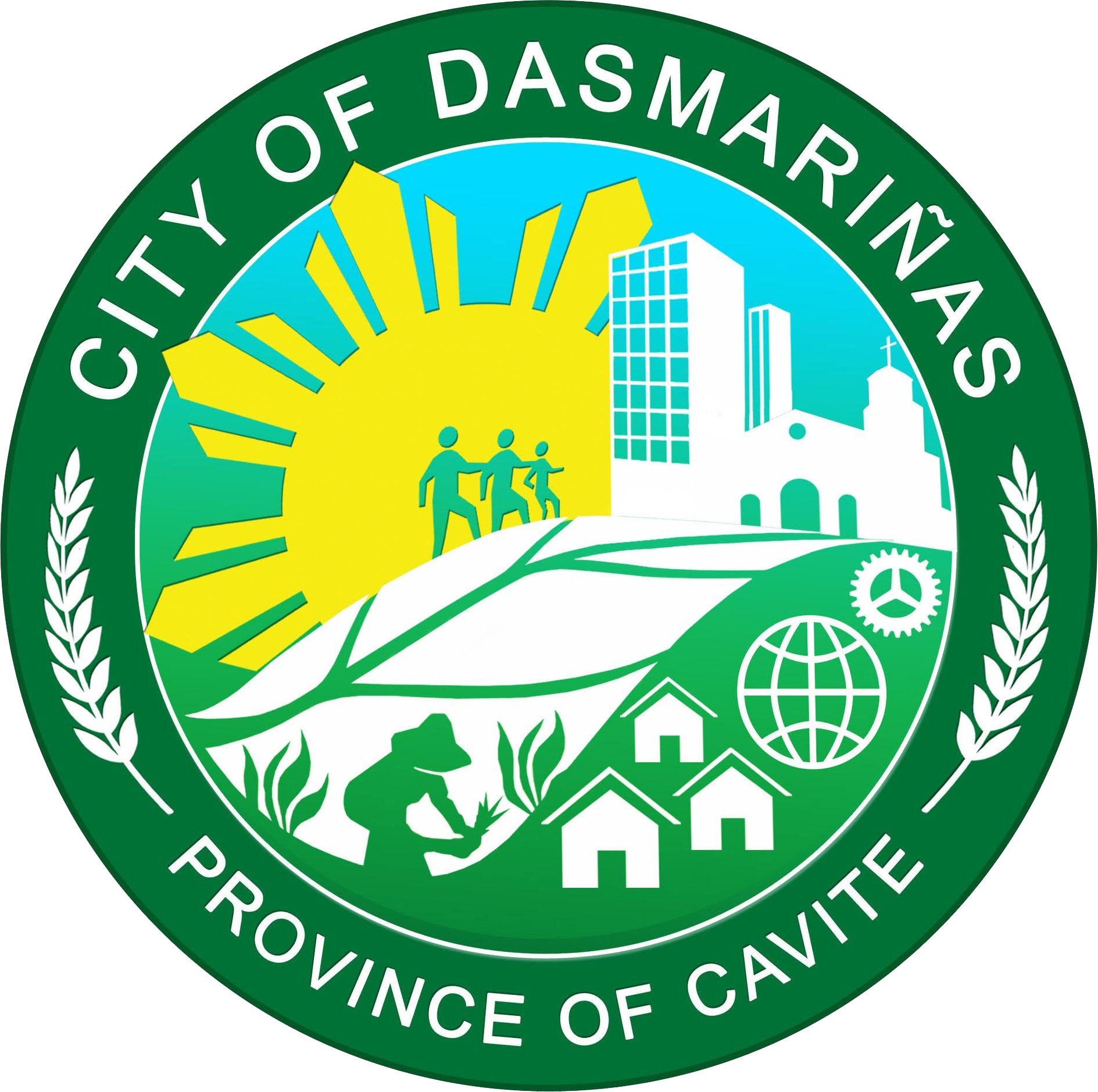
- Incumbent; Rudy Lara since September 1, 2026
- Style: The Honorable (formal)
- Appointer: Elected via popular vote
- Term length: 3 years

The vice mayor of Dasmariñas is the second-highest official in the city government of Dasmariñas. Elected separately from the mayor by popular vote, the vice mayor serves as the presiding officer of the Dasmariñas City Council.

Upon the death, resignation, or removal from office of the incumbent mayor, the vice mayor serves the remainder of the unexpired term until the next general election. If the office of the vice mayor becomes vacant through succession or for any of the foregoing reasons, the highest-ranking member of the city council assumes the office of vice mayor.

The incumbent vice mayor of Dasmariñas is Rudy Lara, who has served since September 1, 2026.

=== List of known vice mayors ===
This list includes the known municipal vice presidents of Pérez Dasmariñas (1900–1917) and Dasmariñas (1917–1948), as well as the municipal vice mayors (1948–2009) and city vice mayors (2009–present) of Dasmariñas.

Portrait	Name (lifespan)	Term	Party	Election	Mayor	Era
	Conrado Malijan	1900 – 1901	Unaffiliated	1900	Francisco E. Barzaga	U.S. Military; Government
	Domingo Mallari	1901 – 1904	Unaffiliated	1901	Placido Campos	U.S. Military; Government
	Domingo Mallari	1901 – 1904	Unaffiliated	1901	Placido Campos	U.S. Insular; Government
	Felix Francisco	1919 – 1922	Unknown	1919	Felipe Tirona	U.S. Insular; Government
	Narciso Guevarra (d. 1982)	1968 – 1971	Nacionalista	1963	Remigio Carungcong	Third Republic
	Florentino Geda	1964 – 1968	Liberal	1967	Remigio Carungcong	Third Republic
	Lauro Carungcong	February 2, 1988 – June 30, 1995	Unknown	1992	Recto Cantimbuhan	Fifth Republic
	Luciano Cantimbuhan	June 30, 1998 – June 30, 2004	Unknown	1998	Elpidio Barzaga Jr.	Fifth Republic
	Luciano Cantimbuhan	June 30, 1998 – June 30, 2004	Lakas	2001	Elpidio Barzaga Jr.	Fifth Republic
	Victor Carungcong	June 30, 2004 – June 30, 2007	PMP	2004	Elpidio Barzaga Jr.	Fifth Republic
	Valeriano Encabo (born 1953)	June 30, 2007 – June 30, 2016	KAMPI	2007	Jenny Barzaga	Fifth Republic
	Valeriano Encabo (born 1953)	June 30, 2007 – June 30, 2016	Lakas	2010	Jenny Barzaga	Fifth Republic
	Valeriano Encabo (born 1953)	June 30, 2007 – June 30, 2016	NUP	2013	Jenny Barzaga	Fifth Republic
	Rex Mangubat	June 30, 2016 – June 30, 2025	NUP	2016	Elpidio Barzaga Jr.	Fifth Republic
	Rex Mangubat	June 30, 2016 – June 30, 2025	PDP–Laban	2019	Jenny Barzaga	Fifth Republic
	Rex Mangubat	June 30, 2016 – June 30, 2025	NUP	2022	Jenny Barzaga	Fifth Republic
	Third Barzaga (born 2000)	June 30, 2025 – September 1, 2026	NUP	2025	Jenny Barzaga	Fifth Republic
	Rudy Lara (born 1947)	September 1, 2026 – present	NUP	—	Third Barzaga	Fifth Republic
