= Elpidio Barzaga III =

Filipino politician (born 2000)

Mayor of Dasmariñas
- Incumbent
- Assumed office September 1, 2026
- Vice Mayor: Rudy Lara
- Preceded by: Jenny Barzaga

Vice Mayor of Dasmariñas
- In office June 30, 2025 – September 1, 2026
- Mayor: Jenny Barzaga
- Preceded by: Rex Mangubat
- Succeeded by: Rudy Lara

Personal details
- Born: Elpidio Austria Barzaga III; September 18, 2000 (age 26) Dasmariñas, Cavite, Philippines
- Party: NUP (2024–present)
- Relations: Kiko Barzaga (brother)
- Parent(s): Elpidio Barzaga Jr. (father); Jenny Barzaga (mother)
- Education: Ateneo de Manila University (BA)
- Nickname: Third

Elpidio "Third" Austria Barzaga III (born September 18, 2000) is a Filipino politician who has served as the mayor of Dasmariñas since September 2026, following the election of his mother, Jenny, as representative of Cavite's 4th congressional district in a special election held in August 2026. A member of the National Unity Party, he previously served as the vice mayor of Dasmariñas under his mother from June 2025 to September 2026.

== Early life and education ==
Barzaga was born on September 18, 2000, in Dasmariñas to then municipal mayor Elpidio Barzaga Jr. and Jenny Barzaga. He attended the Ateneo de Manila University where he earned a degree in political science.

== Political career ==
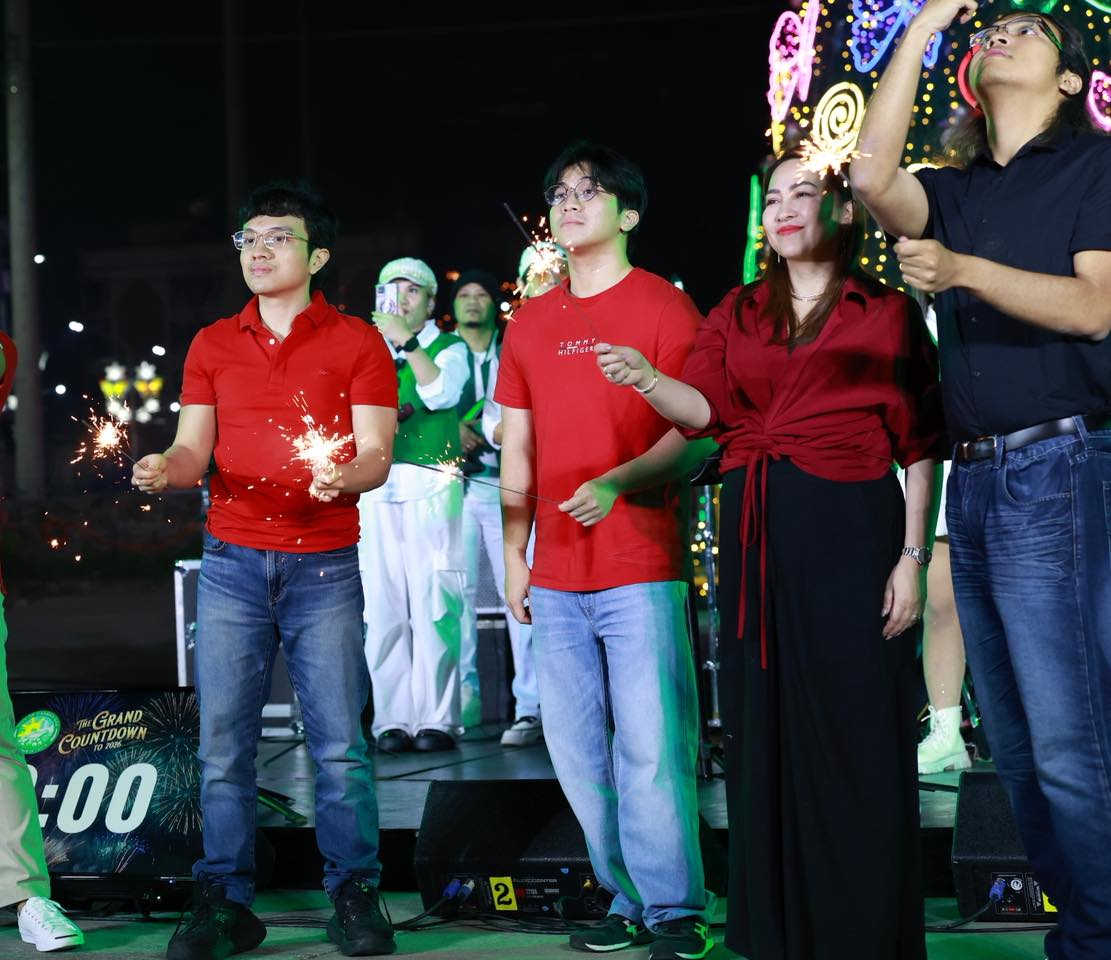
Barzaga (3rd from right) with his mother Jenny and his brothers Kiko and Enzo Barzaga at the City of Dasmariñas Arena for the 2026 New Year's Countdown

Barzaga was selected as his mother Jenny's running mate for vice mayor in the 2025 elections in Dasmariñas, as the incumbent, Rex Mangubat, was term-limited. He ran under the National Unity Party banner, a party where his late father, Elpidio Jr., served as president and chairperson, and won the election with 245,088 of the 314,783 total votes cast.

On June 2, 2026, his elder brother Kiko, then the incumbent representative for Cavite's 4th congressional district, was expelled from the House of Representatives for disorderly conduct after having been suspended twice. The Commission on Elections subsequently called a special election, in which their mother ran as a candidate. She won the election, marking her return to Congress, and Barzaga assumed the mayoralty by succession.

== Electoral history ==
Electoral history of Third Barzaga
Year	Office	Party	Votes received				Result
Year	Office	Party	Total	%	P.	Swing	Result
2025	Vice Mayor of Dasmariñas	NUP	245,088	77.86%	1st	—N/a	Won

Political offices
Preceded by Jenny Barzaga	Mayor of Dasmariñas; September 1, 2026 – present	Incumbent
Preceded by Rex Mangubat	Vice Mayor of Dasmariñas; June 30, 2025 – September 1, 2026	Succeeded by Rudy Lara
