= Jenny Barzaga =

Filipino politician (born 1975)

Jenny Austria-Barzaga
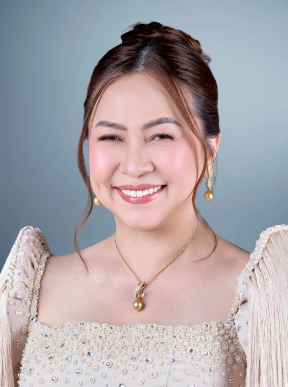
- Official portrait, 2026

Member of the Philippine House of Representatives
- Incumbent
- Assumed office September 1, 2026
- Preceded by: Kiko Barzaga
- Constituency: Cavite–4th
- In office June 30, 2016 – June 30, 2019
- Preceded by: Elpidio Barzaga Jr.
- Succeeded by: Elpidio Barzaga Jr.
- Constituency: Dasmariñas at-large

Mayor of Dasmariñas
- In office June 30, 2019 – September 1, 2026
- Vice Mayor: Rex Mangubat (2019–2025); Third Barzaga (2025–2026)
- Preceded by: Elpidio Barzaga Jr.
- Succeeded by: Third Barzaga
- In office June 30, 2007 – June 30, 2016
- Vice Mayor: Valeriano Encabo
- Preceded by: Elpidio Barzaga Jr.
- Succeeded by: Elpidio Barzaga Jr.

Personal details
- Born: Jennifer Narvaez Austria; September 22, 1975 (age 51) Dasmariñas, Cavite, Philippines
- Party: NUP (2011–present)
- Other political affiliations: Lakas (2008–2011); KAMPI (2007–2008)
- Spouse: Elpidio Barzaga Jr. (m. 1998; died 2024)
- Children: 3, including Kiko and Third
- Education: De La Salle University – Dasmariñas (B.S.)
- Occupation: Politician
- Profession: Nurse
- Nickname: Jenny

Jennifer Narvaez Austria-Barzaga (born September 22, 1975) is a Filipino politician and nurse who has served as the representative of Cavite's 4th congressional district since 2026, and previously from 2016 to 2019. She is a member of the National Unity Party and served as mayor of Dasmariñas from 2007 to 2016 and again from 2019 to 2026.

== Early life and education ==
Barzaga born on September 22, 1975 in Dasmariñas, to Nicanor Romualdo Austria and Amicia Movido Narvaez. She attended elementary school at Dasmariñas Bagong Bayan Elementary School-C (now the Sta. Cristina Elementary School). She later studied secondary at the Immaculate Conception Academy, and tertiary and graduated at the De La Salle University – Dasmariñas. Barzaga became a staff nurse at the De La Salle University Medical Center (DLSUMC) after her graduation.

== Political career ==
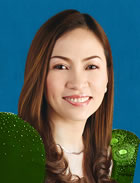
Official portrait of Barzaga in the 17th Congress

Barzaga became a barangay councilor of Barangay San Simon in 1997. She was elected mayor of Dasmariñas in the 2007 elections. She successfully campaigned for the municipality's conversion into a city in 2009 and became its first city mayor. She was re-elected in 2010 and 2013.

Barzaga was elected to the House of Representatives in the 2016 elections, succeeding her husband Elpidio Barzaga Jr., who was term-limited and ran for mayor of Dasmariñas. She was elected mayor of Dasmariñas again in the 2019 elections, and was re-elected in 2022 and 2025. She successfully ran for representative in the 2026 special election following the vacancy created by the expulsion her son, Kiko Barzaga. In that election,she defeated former vice mayor Rex Mangubat by over 170,000 votes. She was sworn in on September 1.

== Personal life ==
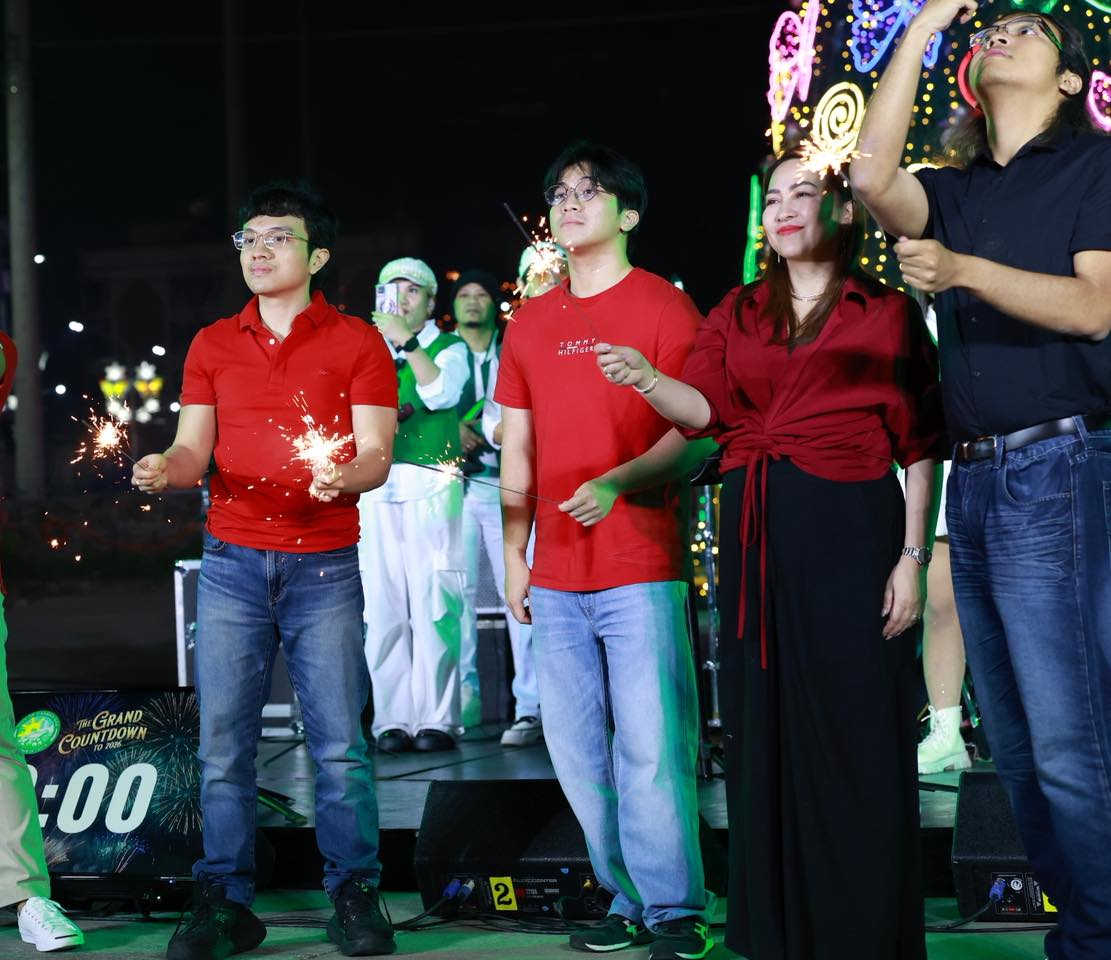
Barzaga (second from right) and her sons Kiko, Third, and Enzo during the 2026 New Year's Countdown at the City of Dasmariñas Arena

She married Elpidio Barzaga Jr., a former mayor of Dasmariñas and congressman, in 1998. Their marriage lasted until his death in 2024. They have three children, including Francisco ("Kiko"), the former representative of Cavite's 4th district and Elpidio III ("Third"), the incumbent mayor of the same city.

== Electoral history ==
Electoral history of Jenny Barzaga
| Year | Office | Party | Votes received | | | | Result |
| Year | Office | Party | Total | % | P. | Swing | Result |
|---|---|---|---|---|---|---|---|
| 2007 | Mayor of Dasmariñas | KAMPI | 100,332 | —N/a | 1st | —N/a | Won |
| 2010 | Mayor of Dasmariñas | Lakas | 158,731 | —N/a | 1st | —N/a | Won |
| 2013 | Mayor of Dasmariñas | NUP | 127,678 | 81.99% | 1st | —N/a | Won |
| 2019 | Mayor of Dasmariñas | NUP | 189,151 | 83.99% | 1st | +2.00 | Won |
| 2022 | Mayor of Dasmariñas | NUP | 261,047 | 83.74% | 1st | −0.25 | Won |
| 2025 | Mayor of Dasmariñas | NUP | 260,308 | 78.12% | 1st | −5.62 | Won |
| 2016 | Representative (Dasmariñas's at-large) | NUP | 227,022 | 95.35% | 1st | —N/a | Won |
| 2026 | Representative (Cavite–4th) | NUP | 201,893 | 78.14% | 1st | −17.21 | Won |
