= 2019 Cavite local elections =

Part of the 2019 Philippine general election

2019 Cavite gubernatorial election
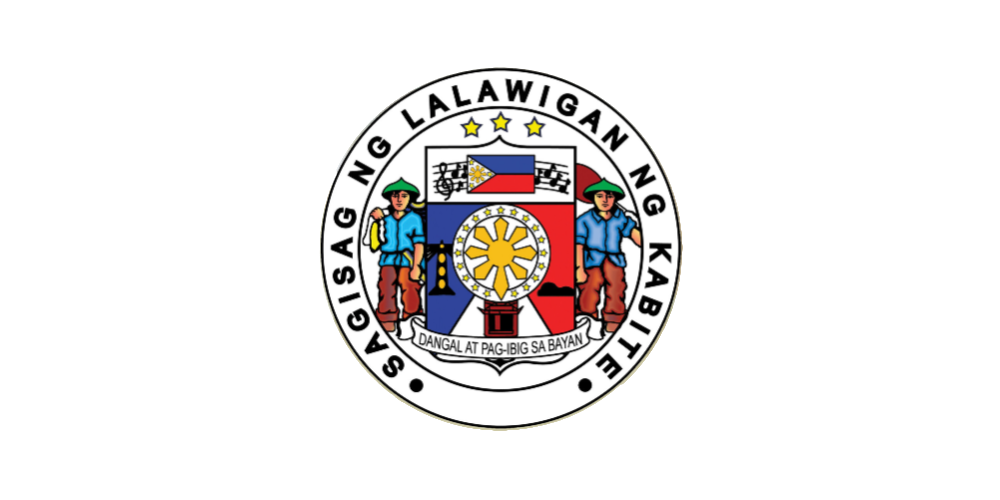
- May 13, 2019
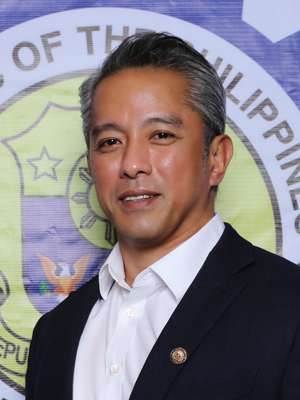

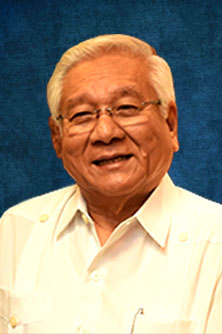
Nominee	Jonvic Remulla	Ayong Maliksi
Party	Nacionalista	Liberal
Running mate	Jolo Revilla (NPC)
Popular vote	823,913	494,476
Percentage	61.69%	37.02%
Governor before election
Jesus Crispin Remulla
Nacionalista
Elected Governor
Jonvic Remulla
Nacionalista

Local elections were held in the province of Cavite of the Philippines, on May 13, 2019, as part of the 2019 general election. Voters selected candidates for all local positions: a municipal and city mayor, vice mayor and councilors, as well as members of the Sangguniang Panlalawigan, the governor, vice governor and representatives for the eight districts of Cavite.

== Provincial elections ==
Incumbents are expressed in italics.

=== Governor ===
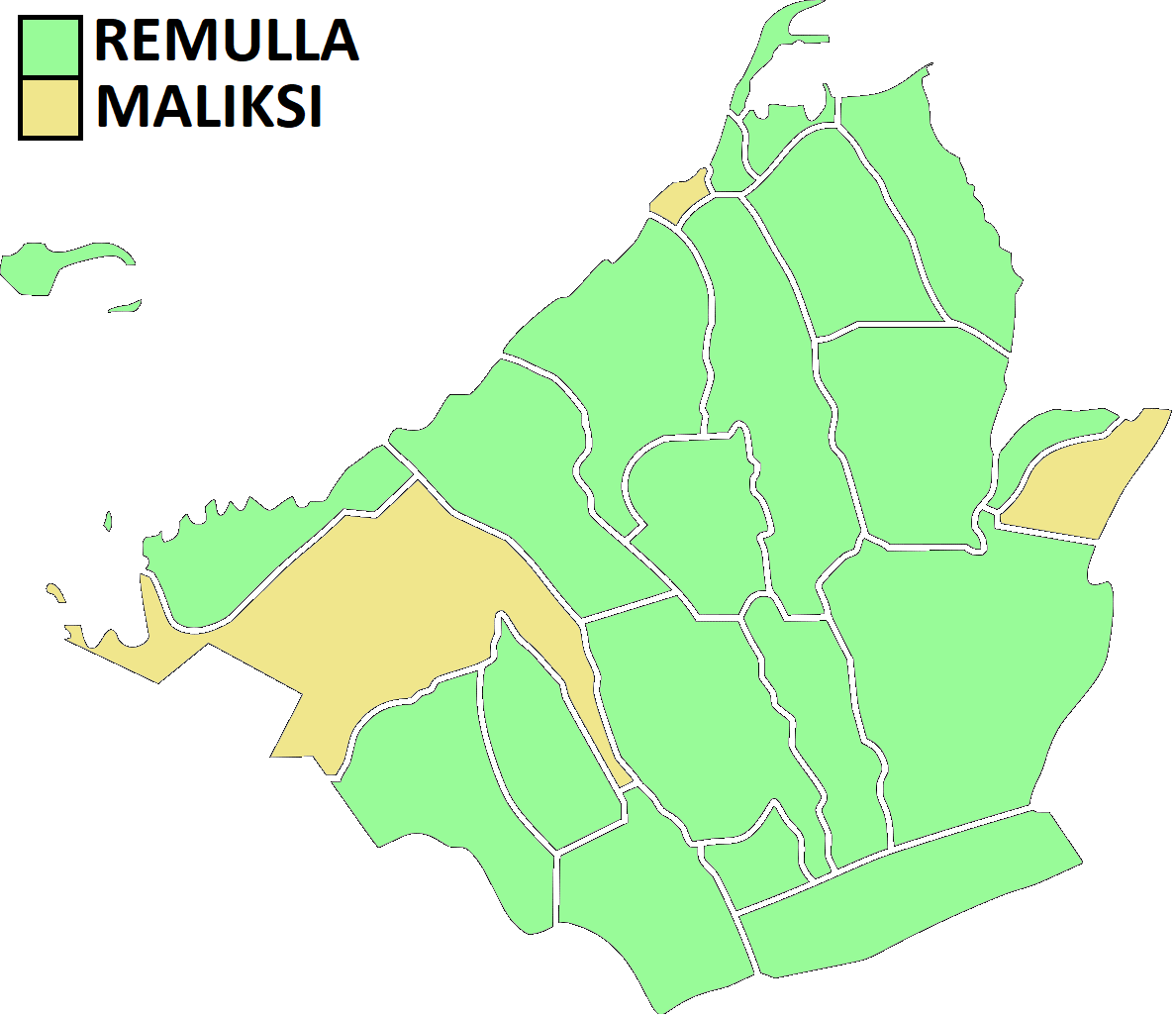
Electoral Result per City/ Municipalities for Governor Position in Cavite

Incumbent Governor Boying Remulla opted not to run for re-election to run for congressman for the 7th District and support to his younger brother, former Governor Jonvic Remulla, is his party's nominee.

Cavite gubernatorial election
Party	Candidate	Votes	%
Nacionalista	Juanito Victor Remulla, Jr.	823,913	61.69%
Liberal	Erineo Maliksi	494,476	37.02%
Independent	Roberto Borral	8,747	0.65%
Independent	Gerbie Ber Ado	8,269	0.61%
Total votes		1,330,930	100%
Nacionalista hold			

=== Vice governor ===
Incumbent Vice-Governor Ramon "Jolo" Revilla III was re-elected unopposed.

Cavite vice-gubernatorial election
Party	Candidate	Votes	%
NPC	Ramon "Jolo" Revilla III	1,036,806	100%
Total votes		1,036,806	100%
NPC hold			

== Congressional elections ==
=== 1st District (Northern Cavite) ===
Francis "Boyblue" Abaya is the incumbent. His opponent is Jose Luis "Jholo" Granados, the son of his 2016 opponent Marina Granados who died in April 2018.

2019 Philippine House of Representatives election in Cavite 1st District.
Party	Candidate	Votes	%
Liberal	Francis Gerald Abaya	117,031	89.28%
PMP	Jose Luis Granados	14,053	10.72%
Total votes		131,084	100%
Liberal hold			

=== 2nd District (Bacoor) ===
Incumbent Representative Strike Revilla is running unopposed.

2019 Philippine House of Representatives election in Cavite 2nd District.
Party	Candidate	Votes	%
NUP	Strike Revilla	141,465	100%
Total votes		141,465	100%
NUP hold			

=== 3rd District (Imus) ===
Incumbent Representative Alex Advincula is running unopposed.

2019 Philippine House of Representatives election in Cavite 3rd District.
Party	Candidate	Votes	%
PDP–Laban	Alex Advincula	116,944	100%
Total votes		116,944	100%
PDP–Laban hold			

=== 4th District (Dasmariñas) ===
Incumbent Representative Jennifer Barzaga opted to run for Mayor of Dasmariñas; she switched her position with her husband, Mayor Elpidio Barzaga, Jr. His opponents are Leonardo "Jun" Manicio, Jr. and retired Police Director, former ACT-CIS Partylist nominee (2016) Benhardi Mantele, and Aileen Padel.

2019 Philippine House of Representatives election in Cavite 4th District.
Party	Candidate	Votes	%
NUP	Elpidio Barzaga, Jr.	198,130	77.27%
PFP	Benhardi Mantele	51,250	19.97%
PDDS	Aileen Padel	3,828	1.49%
PDP–Laban	Leonardo Manicio, Jr.	3,210	1.25%
Total votes		256,418	100%
NUP hold			

=== 5th District (Carsigma) ===
Incumbent Representative Roy Loyola is term-limited and opted to run for Mayor of Carmona instead. His wife, incumbent Carmona Mayor Dahlia Loyola, is his party's nominee.

2019 Philippine House of Representatives election in Cavite 5th District.
Party	Candidate	Votes	%
NPC	Dahlia Loyola	161,772	94.89%
PDP–Laban	Jose Carpio	8,716	5.11%
Total votes		170,488	100%
NPC hold			

=== 6th District (General Trias) ===
Incumbent Representative Luis Ferrer IV is running unopposed.

2019 Philippine House of Representatives election in Cavite 6th District.
Party	Candidate	Votes	%
NUP	Luis A. Ferrer IV	84,282	100%
Total votes		84,282	100%
NUP hold			

=== 7th District (Central Cavite) ===
2019 Philippine House of Representatives election in Cavite 7th District.
Party	Candidate	Votes	%
Nacionalista	Boying Remulla	128,674	67.83%
Aksyon	Hermogenes Arayata III	61,031	32.17%
Total votes		189,705	100%
Nacionalista win (new seat)			

=== 8th District (Southwest Cavite) ===
Incumbent 7th District Representative Abraham Tolentino is running unopposed.

2019 Philippine House of Representatives election in Cavite 8th District.
Party	Candidate	Votes	%
PDP–Laban	Abraham Tolentino	142,389	100%
Total votes		142,389	100%
PDP–Laban win (new seat)			

== Provincial board elections ==
Party	Popular vote		Seats	
Party	Total	%	Total	%
Nacionalista	459,734	24.61%	5	26%
NUP	426,290	22.82%	4	21%
PDP–Laban	267,347	14.31%	3	16%
NPC	244,020	13.06%	1	5%
Liberal	181,884	9.74%	2	11%
Aksyon	114,456	6.13%	0	0%
PFP	33,138	1.77%	0	0%
PDDS	15,028	0.80%	0	0%
Independent	126,111	6.75%	1	5%
Total	1,868,008	100%	16	84%

=== 1st District (Northern Cavite) ===
- City: Cavite City
- Municipalities: Kawit, Noveleta, Rosario

2019 Provincial Board Election in 1st District of Cavite
Party	Candidate	Votes	%
Nacionalista	Davey Christian Chua	90,406	50.04
Nacionalista	Romel Enriquez	75,856	41.99
PDDS	Sionela Eli	7,715	4.27
PDDS	Rodel San Buenaventura	7,018	3.88
Total votes		180,995	100%

=== 2nd District (Bacoor) ===
- City: Bacoor

2019 Provincial Board Election in 2nd District of Cavite (Lone District of Bacoor)
Party	Candidate	Votes	%
NPC	Edralin Gawaran	90,566	33.82
Liberal	Edwin Malvar	87,115	32.53
NPC	Reynaldo Fabian	73,145	27.32
Liberal	Basil Silva	10,382	3.88
PDDS	Julie Wi	6,566	2.45
Total votes		267,774	100%

=== 3rd District (Imus) ===
- City: Imus

2019 Provincial Board Election in 3rd District of Cavite (Lone District of Imus)
Party	Candidate	Votes	%
PDP–Laban	Jeffrey Asistio	90,676	57.41
Liberal	Dennis Lacson	84,387	53.43
PDDS	Sonny Azur	8,462	5.35
Independent	Lucio Minaldo	6,538	4.13
Total votes		157,933	100%

=== 4th District (Dasmariñas) ===
- City: Dasmariñas

2019 Provincial Board Election in 4th District of Cavite (Lone District of Dasmariñas)
Party	Candidate	Votes	%
NUP	Valeriano Encabo	163,481	49.13
NUP	Fulgencio Dela Cuesta, Jr.	136,107	40.90
PFP	Joel Adolfo Musa	19,336	5.81
PFP	Laut Guimbaanun	13,802	4.14
Total votes		332,726	100%

=== 5th District (Carsigma) ===
- Municipalities: Carmona, General Mariano Alvarez, Silang

2019 Provincial Board Election in 5th District of Cavite
Party	Candidate	Votes	%
Nacionalista	Ivee Jayne Reyes	98,394	36.63
Independent	Alston Kevin Anarna	89,848	33.45
NPC	Percival Cabuhat	80,309	29.90
Total votes		268,551	100%

=== 6th District (General Trias) ===
- City: General Trias

2019 Provincial Board Election in 6th District of Cavite (Lone District of General Trias)
Party	Candidate	Votes	%
NUP	Felix Grepo	65,832	51.95
NUP	Kerby Salazar	60,870	48.04
Total votes		126,702	100%

=== 7th District (Central Cavite) ===
- City: Trece Martires
- Municipalities: Amadeo, Indang, Tanza

2019 Provincial Board Election in 7th District of Cavite
Party	Candidate	Votes	%
Nacionalista	Crispin Diego Remulla	111,380	36.12
Nacionalista	Angelito Langit	84,058	27.30
Aksyon	Gene Audrey Arayata	65,439	21.25
Aksyon	Francisco Cunanan, Jr.	49,017	15.92
Total votes		307,894	100%

=== 8th District (Southwest Cavite) ===
- City: Tagaytay
- Municipalities: General Emilio Aguinaldo, Alfonso, Magallanes, Maragondon, Mendez, Naic, Ternate

2019 Provincial Board Election in 8th District of Cavite
Party	Candidate	Votes	%
PDP–Laban	Rainier Ambion	104,742	54.64
PDP–Laban	Virgilio Varias	71,929	37.52
Independent	Ryan Uy	14,992	7.82
Total votes		191,663	100%

== City and municipal elections ==
=== 1st District (Northern Cavite) ===
==== Cavite City ====
Incumbent Mayor Bernardo "Totie" Paredes and Vice Mayor Denver Chua are running unopposed under the Nacionalista Party.

Cavite City Mayoralty Election
Party	Candidate	Votes	%
Nacionalista	Bernardo Paredes	32,856	
Total votes			

Cavite City Vice Mayoralty Election
Party	Candidate	Votes	%
Nacionalista	Denver Chua	34,857	
Total votes			

==== Kawit ====
Kawit Mayoralty Election
Party	Candidate	Votes	%
NPC	Angelo Emilio Aguinaldo	19,301	
Independent	Federico Poblete	15,563	
Lakas	Eduardo Solis, Jr.	1,834	
Total votes			

Kawit Vice Mayoralty Election
Party	Candidate	Votes	%
Nacionalista	Armando Bernal	18,972	
Independent	Reynaldo Aguinaldo	14,277	
NPC	William Narvaez	1,543	
Total votes			

==== Noveleta ====
Noveleta Mayoralty Election
Party	Candidate	Votes	%
Nacionalista	Dino Reyes Chua	15,048	
Total votes			
Nacionalista hold			

Noveleta Vice Mayoralty Election
Party	Candidate	Votes	%
Aksyon	Arlynn Torres	9,554	
Nacionalista	Enrico Alvarez	9,473	
Total votes			

==== Rosario ====
Rosario Mayoralty Election
Party	Candidate	Votes	%
Liberal	Jose Ricafrente, Jr.	45,192	
Independent	Joemel Pulido	4,972	
Independent	Franklin Morabe	295	
Total votes			

Rosario Vice Mayoralty Election
Party	Candidate	Votes	%
Liberal	Jose Voltaire Ricafrente	45,604	
Total votes			
Liberal hold			

=== 2nd District (Bacoor) ===
==== Bacoor ====
Incumbent Mayor Lani Mercado-Revilla is running for reelection.

Bacoor Mayoralty Election
Party	Candidate	Votes	%
PDP–Laban	Lani Mercado-Revilla	141,848	
PDDS	Jose Francisco	18,903	
Total votes		160,751	100

Bacoor Vice Mayoralty Election
Party	Candidate	Votes	%
Lakas	Catherine Sariño-Evaristo	129,840	
PDDS	Nestor dela Cruz	20,497	
Total votes		150,337	100

=== 3rd District (Imus) ===
==== Imus ====
Imus Mayoralty Election
Party	Candidate	Votes	%
Liberal	Emmanuel Maliksi	73,186	
PMP	Homer Saquilayan	64,786	
Total votes			

Imus Vice Mayoralty Election
Party	Candidate	Votes	%
PDP–Laban	Ony Cantimbuhan	70,546	
PMP	Shernan Jaro	62,184	
Total votes			

=== 4th District (Dasmariñas) ===
==== Dasmariñas ====
Dasmariñas Mayoralty Election
Party	Candidate	Votes	%
NUP	Jennifer Barzaga	189,151	
UNA	Jacinto Frani, Jr.	44,073	
PFP	Mario Marasigan	18,951	
Independent	Osmundo Calupad	2,052	
DPP	Eduardo Credo	992	
Total votes		225,219	

Dasmariñas Vice Mayoralty Election
Party	Candidate	Votes	%
PDP–Laban	Rex Mangubat	178,627	
PFP	Luisito Bautista	28,626	
Independent	Miguelito Ilano	23,739	
Total votes		230,992	

=== 5th District (CarSiGMA) ===
==== Carmona ====
Carmona Mayoralty Election
Party	Candidate	Votes	%
NPC	Roy Loyola	33,326	
PDP–Laban	Alexis Reyes	2,294	
Total votes			

Carmona Vice Mayoralty Election
Party	Candidate	Votes	%
NPC	Cesar Ines, Jr.	29,598	
PDP–Laban	Lolita Tenedero	3,833	
Total votes			

==== General Mariano Alvarez ====
General Mariano Alvarez Mayoralty Election
Party	Candidate	Votes	%
NPC	Walter Echevarria, Jr.	36,368	
NUP	Ona Virata	14,012	
Independent	Ed Custodio	7,992	
Independent	Jeanpaul Petate	570	
Total votes			

General Mariano Alvarez Vice Mayoralty Election
Party	Candidate	Votes	%
NPC	Maricel Torres	46,024	
PFP	Meldan Llanes	9,407	
Total votes			

==== Silang ====
Incumbent mayor, Omil Poblete is not running. Her sister, Corie Poblete is the party's nominee.

Silang Mayoralty Election
Party	Candidate	Votes	%
Nacionalista	Corie Poblete	57,854	
Independent	Marianito Poblete	29,960	
Total votes		87,814	100%

Silang Vice Mayoralty Election
Party	Candidate	Votes	%
Nacionalista	Aidel Paul Belamide	73,526	
Total votes		73,526	100%

=== 6th District (General Trias) ===
==== General Trias ====
General Trias Mayoralty Election
Party	Candidate	Votes	%
NUP	Antonio Ferrer	85,244	
Total votes			

General Trias Vice Mayoralty Election
Party	Candidate	Votes	%
NUP	Maurito Sison	79,498	
Total votes			

=== 7th District (Cavite Central) ===
==== Trece Martires ====
Mayor Melandres de Sagun is term-limited. He withdrew his candidacy for Congressman of Seventh District after he was accused as the mastermind of the assassination of Vice Mayor Alexander Lubigan a few days after the assassination of Antonio Halili. His father, former Mayor Melencio de Sagun, Jr. is his party's nominee. His opponents are Lubigan's widow Gemma and Vice Mayor Denver Colorado who was elevated to the Vice Mayorship after Lubigan's assassination.

Trece Martires Mayoralty Election
Party	Candidate	Votes	%
Nacionalista	Gemma Lubigan	28,329	47.12%
Aksyon	Melencio De Sagun, Jr.	21,376	35.56%
Independent	Denver Colorado	10,407	17.31%
Total votes		60,112	100.00%

Trece Martires Vice Mayoralty Election
Party	Candidate	Votes	%
Nacionalista	Romeo Montehermoso, Jr.	31,360	55.42%
Liberal	Remigio Dilag	25,222	44.57%
Total votes		56,582	100.00%

==== Amadeo ====
Mayor Conrado Viado who was elevated to the Mayorship after the death of Mayor Albert Ambagan has opted to run as Vice Mayor.

Amadeo Mayoralty Election
Party	Candidate	Votes	%
Nacionalista	Redel John Dionisio	11,143	
PDP–Laban	John Roque Ambagan	8,720	
Total votes			

Amadeo Vice Mayoralty Election
Party	Candidate	Votes	%
Nacionalista	Conrado Viado	15,389	
Total votes			

==== Indang ====
Both incumbent Mayor Perfecto Fidel and Vice Mayor Ismael Rodil are running unopposed.

Indang Mayoralty Election
Party	Candidate	Votes	%
Nacionalista	Perfecto Fidel	26,296	
Total votes			100%
Nacionalista hold			

Indang Vice Mayoralty Election
Party	Candidate	Votes	%
Nacionalista	Ismael Rodil	24,788	
Total votes			100%
Nacionalista hold			

==== Tanza ====
Tanza Mayoralty Election
Party	Candidate	Votes	%
Nacionalista	Yuri Pacumio	68,668	
Aksyon	Marcus Ashley Arayata	24,110	
Total votes		96,781	100%

Tanza Vice Mayoralty Election
Party	Candidate	Votes	%
Nacionalista	Raymundo Del Rosario	69,804	
Aksyon	Arleen Arayata	20,696	
Total votes		96,781	100%

=== 8th District (Cavite Southwest) ===
==== Tagaytay ====
Both incumbent mayor Agnes Delgado-Tolentino, wife of incumbent 7th District representative Abraham Tolentino and sister-in-law of 2019 senatorial candidate Francis Tolentino, and running mate city Vice Mayor Raymond Ambion will be running unopposed, all 10 candidates for city council are filled.

Tagaytay Mayoralty Election
Party	Candidate	Votes	%
PDP–Laban	Agnes Delgado-Tolentino	31,291	
Total votes		31,291	
PDP–Laban hold			

Tagaytay Vice Mayoralty Election
Party	Candidate	Votes	%
PDP–Laban	Raymund Ambion	25,886	
Total votes		25,886	
PDP–Laban hold			

==== Alfonso ====
Mayor Virgilio Varias is term limited, although he was elected in the disputed elections of 2007 with former Mayor Jose Peñano. He will run for board member of Eight District under PDP-Laban. His party nominated Vice Mayor Randy Salamat with Councilor Madonna Mojica-Pel as his running mate. Pel is opposed by outgoing Eight District Board Member Reinalyn Varias. Salamat will face Raul Rodis.

Alfonso Mayoralty Election
Party	Candidate	Votes	%
PDP–Laban	Randy Salamat	20,747	
Independent	Raul Rodis	5,067	
Total votes			

Alfonso Vice Mayoralty Election
Party	Candidate	Votes	%
PDP–Laban	Madona Pel	12,996	
Independent	Reinalyne Varias	12,721	
Total votes			

==== General Emilio Aguinaldo ====
General Emilio Aguinaldo Mayoralty Election
Party	Candidate	Votes	%
Nacionalista	Nelia Angeles	6,320	
Total votes			
Nacionalista hold			

General Emilio Aguinaldo Vice Mayoralty Election
Party	Candidate	Votes	%
Nacionalista	Louel Golfo	8,171	
Total votes			
Nacionalista hold			

==== Magallanes ====
Magallanes Mayoralty Election
Party	Candidate	Votes	%
Nacionalista	Jasmin Maligaya	9,226	
PFP	Delfin Genio	897	
Total votes			

Magallanes Vice Mayoralty Election
Party	Candidate	Votes	%
PDP–Laban	Renato Dimapilis	7,146	
Total votes			
PDP–Laban hold			

==== Maragondon ====
Councilor Lawrence Arca is running against incumbent Mayor Reynaldo Rillo.

Maragondon Mayoralty Election
Party	Candidate	Votes	%
Independent	Reynaldo Rillo	11,799	
Independent	Lawrence Arca	10,639	
Total votes		22,438	

Maragondon Vice Mayoralty Election
Party	Candidate	Votes	%
Liberal	Alfredo Bersabe	9,213	
Independent	Noel Rillo	7,259	
Independent	Reagan Gulapa	5,175	
Total votes		21,647	

==== Mendez ====
Incumbent Mayor Eric Vida is running unopposed.

Mendez Mayoralty Election
Party	Candidate	Votes	%
Nacionalista	Eric Vida	11,102	
Independent	Virgilio Perido	3,815	
Total votes		14,917	100%

Mendez Vice Mayoralty Election
Party	Candidate	Votes	%
Nacionalista	Francisco Mendoza, Jr.	12,721	
Total votes		12,721	
Nacionalista hold			

==== Naic ====
Naic Mayoralty Election
Party	Candidate	Votes	%
Nacionalista	Junio Dualan	35,592	
Independent	Rodolfo Nazareno	10,219	
Total votes			

Naic Vice Mayoralty Election
Party	Candidate	Votes	%
Nacionalista	Roger Pangilinan	27,513	
Independent	Cesar Loyola, Jr.	19,036	
Total votes			

==== Ternate ====
Ternate Mayoralty Election
Party	Candidate	Votes	%
PDP–Laban	Lamberto Bambao	9,063	
Nacionalista	Herminio Lindo	4,657	
Independent	Carlito Huerto	428	
Total votes			

Ternate Vice Mayoralty Election
Party	Candidate	Votes	%
PDP–Laban	Salvador Gubio, Jr.	6,879	
Nacionalista	Deonilo Bersamina	4,808	
Total votes			
