= 2016 Cavite local elections =

Philippine election

2016 Cavite gubernatorial election
- May 9, 2016
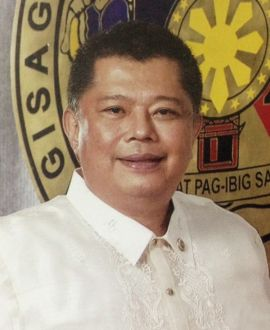
Nominee	Jesus Crispin Remulla	Bong Ber Ado
Party	UNA	Liberal
Running mate	Jolo Revilla (Lakas)	Irene De Padua-Bencito
Popular vote	1,069,162	17,852
Percentage	94.16%	1.57%
Governor before election
Juanito Victor Remulla
UNA
Elected Governor
Jesus Crispin Remulla
UNA

Local elections were held in Cavite on May 9, 2016, as part of the 2016 general election. Voters will select candidates for all local positions: a town mayor, vice mayor and town councilors, as well as members of the Sangguniang Panlalawigan, the vice-governor, governor and representatives for the seven districts of Cavite. Originally, incumbent Governor Jonvic Remulla was set running for his final term under Partido Magdalo and supported by the Estrada-Binay-led (and Aquino's administration opposition party) United Nationalist Alliance along with Vice-Governor Jolo Revilla, however, he later dropped out and was replaced by his brother Jesus Crispin Remulla, who ran solo instead.

== Background ==
Their rivals, who belong to the Liberal Party, will not be fielding a candidate for the gubernatorial post. The party's 2013 standard-bearer Ayong Maliksi is said to be no longer running as he would instead concentrate on being the chairperson of the Philippine Charity Sweepstakes Office. It initially offered 7th District Representative Abraham "Bambol" Tolentino the party's gubernatorial slot, but talks stopped when the incumbent (Remulla) talked to Maliksi, who in turn promised his former vice governor that his party will not field a candidate for the governorship, thus making Remulla virtually unopposed for his third and final term (his opponent is perennial Cavite candidate Gerbie Berado). Tolentino will instead run for re-election for his district seat.

However, LP considered who among 5th District (CarSiGMA) Representative Roy Loyola or 6th District Representative Luis "Jonjon" Ferrer IV as their vice gubernatorial bet upon consultation, opposing the younger Revilla. 4th District (Dasmariñas) Representative Elpidio Barzaga's name was under consideration for the vice governorship, but instead filed his candidacy for city mayor, where he will switch positions with his wife, Jennifer Austria-Barzaga, Pidi will oppose by a 23 year old Jigz Padillo which support Sen. Grace Poe.

In the end, LP will instead field 7th district board member Irene De Padua-Bencito as its vice gubernatorial candidate. She will be supported by some of Cavite's political clans, among others, the Maliksis, Barzagas and Loyolas.

On December 9, 2015, Cavite Governor Jonvic Remulla said he will withdrawing his candidacy for re-election to pursue post graduate studies. His brother, Jesus Crispin "Boying" Remulla will substitute for him. Sources also say that Boying Remulla will not support the vice gubernatorial bid of Jolo Revilla and will instead go solo, however Revilla seen on Binay campaign rally in Cavite City on February 11, 2016, as Binay will appoint Jonvic as Department of the Interior and Local Government Secretary if Binay become president.

On February 27, 2016, Jolo Revilla (and Remulla brothers) endorses Sen. Bongbong Marcos as their vice-presidential candidate (although him, he is still remained as a "running mate" of PRP's presidential candidate Sen. Miriam Defensor Santiago.) And the Revilla's support Grace Poe as president.

== Candidates ==
Incumbents are expressed in italics.

=== Governor ===
Incumbent Jonvic Remulla originally intended to run for his third and final term. However, he withdrew his candidacy. His brother, former 7th District Representative Jesus Crispin Remulla, substituted him.

Cavite gubernatorial election
Party	Candidate	Votes	%
UNA	Jesus Crispin Remulla	1,069,162	94.16%
PDP–Laban	Obet Borral	26,285	2.31%
Independent	Richard Balanzag	22,231	1.96%
Liberal	Gerbie Ber Ado	17,852	1.57%
Total votes		1,135,530	100%
UNA hold			

=== Vice-Governor ===
Vice Governor Jolo Revilla (Lakas–CMD) ran against 7th District Board Member Irene Bencito, Eddie De Asis & Severina Saulog. Although listed as an independent, Bencito was supported by the local Liberal and Nacionalista parties.

Cavite vice-gubernatorial election
Party	Candidate	Votes	%
Lakas	Ramon "Jolo" Revilla III	938,096	81.67%
Liberal	Irene Bencito	150,617	13.11%
Independent	Eddie De Asis	30,968	2.7%
PDP–Laban	Severina Saulog	28,977	2.52%
Total votes		1,148,658	100%
Lakas hold			

=== Congressional Elections ===
==== 1st District Northern Cavite ====
2016 Philippine House of Representatives election in Cavite 1st District.
Party	Candidate	Votes	%
Liberal	Francis Gerald Abaya	114,700	86.5%
NPC	Marina Rieta Granados	17,605	13.5%
Total votes		132,305	100%
Liberal hold			

==== 2nd District (Bacoor) ====
Incumbent Lani Mercado-Revilla is running for Mayor of Bacoor. Her brother-in-law, incumbent Bacoor Mayor Strike Revilla, is her party's nominee.

2016 Philippine House of Representatives election in Cavite 2nd District.
Party	Candidate	Votes	%
Lakas	Edwin "Strike" Revilla	141,149	89.7%
Liberal	Mark Orline Buena	16,204	10.3%
Total votes		157,353	100%
Lakas hold			

==== 3rd District (Imus) ====
Incumbent Representative Alex Advincula ran unopposed.

2016 Philippine House of Representatives election in Cavite 3rd District.
Party	Candidate	Votes	%
Liberal	Alex Advincula	105,989	100%
Total votes		105,989	100%
Liberal hold			

==== 4th District (Dasmariñas) ====
Incumbent Elpidio Barzaga, Jr. is term-limited and is running for mayor of Dasmariñas. His wife, incumbent Mayor Jennifer Barzaga, is his party's nominee.

2016 Philippine House of Representatives election in Cavite 4th District.
Party	Candidate	Votes	%
NUP	Jennifer Barzaga	227,022	95.35%
UNA	Alen Manzano	11,064	4.65%
Total votes		238,086	100%
NUP hold			

==== 5th District (Carsigma) ====
Running on his last term under Liberal Party, incumbent Rep. Roy Loyola ran against former Silang Mayor Ruben Madlansacay under Nacionalista Party.

2016 Philippine House of Representatives election in Cavite 5th District.
Party	Candidate	Votes	%
Liberal	Roy Loyola	134,316	73.22%
Nacionalista	Ruben Madlansacay	49,113	26.77%
Total votes		183,429	100%
Liberal hold			

==== 6th District (Cavite Central) ====
Luis "Jon-Jon" Ferrer IV ran unopposed as district representative.

2016 Philippine House of Representatives election in Cavite 6th District.
Party	Candidate	Votes	%
NUP	Luis "Jon-Jon" Ferrer IV	176,777	100%
Total votes		176,777	100%
NUP hold			

==== 7th District (Cavite Southwest) ====
Incumbent Congressman Abraham Tolentino ran unopposed.

2016 Philippine House of Representatives election in Cavite 7th District.
Party	Candidate	Votes	%
Liberal	Abraham Tolentino	163,514	100%
Total votes		163,514	100%
Liberal hold			

=== Provincial Board Elections ===
==== First District (Cavite North) ====
- City: Cavite City
- Municipality: Kawit, Noveleta, Rosario

2016 Provincial Board Election in 1st District of Cavite
Party	Candidate	Votes	%
UNA	Ryan Enriquez	84,074	37.22%
UNA	Gilbert Gandia	51,083	22.62%
Liberal	Christopher Go	48,713	21.57%
NPC	Rebene Carrera	19,361	8.57%
PGP	Michael Del Rosario	15,877	7.02%
NPC	William Wee Narvaez	6,765	3.00%
Total votes		225,873	100%

==== Second District (Lone District of Bacoor) ====
- City: Bacoor

Voters of the city elected two board members at-large, regardless of whether these voters are from Bacoor West or Bacoor East (the city's city council districts). Incumbent board member Edralin "Aba" Gawaran, who was nationally known as one of the right-hand men of detained Senator Ramon "Bong" Revilla Jr. when he was arrested and taken to jail for corruption charges in 2014 in connection with the PDAF scam, will vie for re-election. His partner for the other slot within Team Revilla was outgoing city councilor Reynaldo Fabian. They were opposed by former three-term municipal councilor Peter Simon Lara, transport operator and businessperson Neil Ragasa, and Rosalina Francisco.

Remulla, the other incumbent board member, is running for mayor.

2016 Provincial Board Election in 2nd District of Cavite (Lone District of Bacoor)
Party	Candidate	Votes	%
Lakas	Edralin Gawaran	104,468	39.82%
Lakas	Reynaldo Fabian	92,081	35.10%
Nacionalista	Honesto Mercado, Jr.	21,855	8.33%
Liberal	Rosalina Francisco	20,761	7.91%
NUP	Cornelio Ragasa	16,001	6.10%
Liberal	Lucio Alejo IV	7,159	2.73%
Total votes		262,325	100%

==== Third District (Lone District of Imus) ====
- City: Imus

Voters of the city will elect two board members at-large.

Due to the forged alliance between the Liberal Party, United Nationalist Alliance-Partido Magdalo, and Lakas–CMD, the "ONE IMUS" coalition was launched in October 2015. Incumbent Larry Boy Nato and former Imus mayor Homer Saquilayan ran for the district's two board seats under the said coalition.

Only the 3rd district has two unopposed candidates for representation in the provincial board.

2016 Provincial Board Election in 3rd District of Cavite (Lone District of Imus)
Party	Candidate	Votes	%
Liberal	Larry Boy Nato	71,195	45.08%
Nacionalista	Homer Saquilayan	86,738	54.92%
Total votes		157,933	100%

==== Fourth District (Lone District of Dasmariñas) ====
- City: Dasmariñas

2016 Provincial Board Election in 4th District of Cavite (Lone District of Dasmariñas)
Party	Candidate	Votes	%
NUP	Valeriano Encabo	159,016	47.56%
NUP	Teofilo "Rudy" Lara	155,947	46.64%
UNA	Laut Guimbaanun	19,394	5.80%
Total votes		334,357	100%

==== Fifth District (Carsigma) ====
- Municipality: Carmona, General Mariano Alvarez, Silang

2016 Provincial Board Election in 5th District of Cavite
Party	Candidate	Votes	%
UNA	Ivee Jayne Reyes	92,701	38.31%
UNA	Marcos Amutan	88,824	36.71%
NUP	Domeng Tenedero	60,446	24.98%
Total votes		241,971	100%

==== Sixth District (Cavite Central) ====
- City: General Trias, Trece Martires
- Municipality: Amadeo, Tanza

Current BM Felix Grepo stands to run for reelection this year.

2016 Provincial Board Election in 6th District of Cavite
Party	Candidate	Votes	%
UNA	Raymundo Del Rosario	108,509	33.94%
NUP	Felix Grepo	97,063	30.36%
UNA	Melencio "Jun" De Sagun, Jr.	87,128	27.25%
PRP	Dakila Bocalan, Jr.	27,027	8.45%
Total votes		319,727	100%

==== Seventh District (Cavite Southwest) ====
- City: Tagaytay
- Municipality: Alfonso, General Emilio Aguinaldo, Indang, Magallanes, Maragondon, Mendez, Naic, Ternate

2016 Provincial Board Election in 7th District of Cavite
Party	Candidate	Votes	%
Liberal	Rainier Ambion	111,662	52.01%
UNA	Reinalyne Varias-Vidallon	75,372	35.11%
UNA	Jasmin Manahan	27,659	12.88%
Total votes		214,693	100%

=== Mayoral Election ===
==== First District ====
===== Cavite City =====
Incumbent Mayor Bernardo "Totie" Paredes sought for re-election for his fifth non-consecutive term. His opponent was then-vice mayor Percilito "Penchie" Consigo. They were partners in the 2013 election and were only estranged in the weeks leading to the filing of certificates of candidacy. Meanwhile, City Councilor Denver Chua ran for Vice Mayor under Mayor Paredes' ticket. He ran against barangay captain Obet de Leon under the Liberal Party ticket.

Cavite City Mayoralty Election
Party	Candidate	Votes	%
UNA	Bernardo Paredes	25,910	55.59%
Liberal	Percilito Consigo	20,450	43.88%
PGP	Victor Borromeo	249	0.53%
Total votes		46,609	100%
UNA hold			

Cavite City Vice Mayoralty Election
Party	Candidate	Votes	%
UNA	Denver Chua	34,385	80.49%
Liberal	Obet de Leon	8,333	19.51%
Total votes		42,718	100%
UNA hold			

===== Kawit =====
Cousins Paul Plaridel Abaya and Angelo Emilio Aguinaldo are running for mayor. The former is the incumbent vice mayor and brother of Secretary Joseph Emilio Abaya and Representative Francis "Blue" Abaya, while the latter, the perceived preferred candidate of Partido Magdalo in Kawit, is an incumbent councilor and son of third-term Mayor Reynaldo "Tik" Aguinaldo.

Kawit Mayoralty Election
Party	Candidate	Votes	%
NPC	Angelo Emilio Aguinaldo	20,269	57.09%
Liberal	Paul Plaridel Abaya	15,230	42.91%
Total votes		35,499	100%
NPC gain from Liberal			

Kawit Vice Mayoralty Election
Party	Candidate	Votes	%
UNA	Armando Bernal	18,335	53.19%
NPC	Alvin Bunag	16,134	46.81%
Total votes		34,469	100%
UNA gain from NPC			

===== Noveleta =====
Three-termer outgoing mayor Enrico "Boy" Alvarez has agreed to the request of Governor Jonvic Remulla to field a common candidate for the UNA-Partido Magdalo Coalition in Noveleta, Cavite. Because of this "One Cavite" project of the governor, Mayor Boy Alvarez endorsed former vice mayor and incumbent provincial board member Dino Reyes Chua to be his successor as mayor of Noveleta. Meanwhile, his younger brother, Noveleta incumbent vice mayor Davey Reyes Chua, is supposedly running for provincial board member to replace his elder brother, who is running for Noveleta mayor. But the governor has committed the party slot for another candidate which made him decide to give way and just run for re-election as municipal councilor of Noveleta to support the mayoral bid of his brother. The Reyes-Chua Brothers came from the Reyes Clan of Noveleta. The legacy of the Reyes Clan started with the late Mayor Librado Reyes and Mayor Pepe Reyes (father and son) who both served as Noveleta mayors during the 1950s and 1980s respectively.

Noveleta Mayoralty Election
Party	Candidate	Votes	%
UNA	Dino Chua	12,510	72.15%
Liberal	Dindo Santamaria	4,829	27.85%
Total votes		17,339	100%
UNA hold			

Noveleta Vice Mayoralty Election
Party	Candidate	Votes	%
Nacionalista	Dave Manalo	8,345	49.09%
Liberal	Dionisio Torres	8,655	50.91%
Total votes		17,000	100%
Liberal gain from UNA			

===== Rosario =====
Incumbent Mayor Jose "Nonong" Ricafrente is term-limited and will switch positions with his son, incumbent Vice Mayor Voltaire Ricafrente, who in turn will be opposed by former mayor and incumbent provincial administrator Renato Abutan.

Rosario Mayoralty Election
Party	Candidate	Votes	%
UNA	Renato Abutan	17,915	34.52%
Liberal	Voltaire Ricafrente	33,981	65.48%
Total votes		51,896	100%
Liberal hold			

Nonong Ricafrente, in turn, will be opposed by his former vice mayor Jose Rozel Hernandez.

Rosario Vice Mayoralty Election
Party	Candidate	Votes	%
UNA	Jose Rozel Hernandez	14,004	27.66%
Liberal	Jose Ricafrente, Jr.	36,620	72.34%
Total votes		50,624	100%
Liberal hold			

==== Second District ====
===== Bacoor =====
Incumbent Edwin "Strike" Revilla is already in his third term as mayor of Bacoor; therefore he is disqualified from running for another term for the same position despite Bacoor's change in status as a city in 2012. He will be running for representative to switch positions with his sister-in-law, Lani Mercado-Revilla. Her opponents are former municipal vice mayor and provincial board member Edwin Malvar and incumbent provincial board member Rolando "Andoy" Remulla.

Bacoor Mayoralty Election
Party	Candidate	Votes	%
Liberal	Edwin Malvar	21,184	12.07%
Lakas	Lani Mercado-Revilla	106,964	60.93%
NUP	Rolando Remulla	47,399	27%
Total votes		175,547	100%

Incumbent vice mayor Catherine Sariño-Evaristo will be Representative Mercado-Revilla's running mate. Her announced opponents are former city Business Permits and Licensing Office head Allen Reyes and former municipal councilor and three-term provincial board member Cesario "Jun" Del Rosario Jr., who recently is an editor and deputy chief of reporters at CNN Philippines.

Bacoor Vice Mayoralty Election
Party	Candidate	Votes	%
Liberal	Cesario Del Rosario, Jr.	25,449	15.86%
NUP	Allen Reyes	34,287	21.36%
Lakas	Catherine Sariño-Evaristo	100,769	62.78%
Total votes		160,505	100%

==== Third District ====
===== Imus =====
Incumbent mayor Emmanuel "Manny" Maliksi is running reelection as a result of an alliance forged between his camp and the camp of his perennial rival, Homer "Saki" Saquilayan, who will instead run for provincial board member. Astillero, a well-known nuisance candidate, is also running for mayor.

Imus Mayoralty Election
Party	Candidate	Votes	%
UNA	A.A. Astillero (Nuisance)	4,416	3.64
Lakas	Kiko Herrera	17,558	14.48
Liberal	Emmanuel Maliksi	99,256	81.88
Total votes		121,230	100%

Imus Vice Mayoralty Election
Party	Candidate	Votes	%
Liberal	Ony Cantimbuhan	68,464	54.80
UNA	Shernan Jaro	56,479	45.20
Total votes		124,943	100%

==== Fourth District ====
===== Dasmariñas =====
Incumbent Mayor Jenny Barzaga is term limited and she running in the Congress, her husband Pidi is running, his primary opponents Arnel del Rosario and Jigger "Jigz" Padillo (Nationalist People's Coalition), the two candidates are supporting Rodrigo Duterte (PDP–Laban) and Sen. Grace Poe (Partido Galing at Puso) respectively.

Dasmariñas Mayoralty Election
Party	Candidate	Votes	%
NUP	Elpidio Barzaga, Jr.	212,962	91.70
Nacionalista	Amado Beltran	1,824	0.79
PRP	Wilihardo Campos	2,782	1.20
PDP–Laban	Arnel Del Rosario	13,310	5.72
Independent	Willy Gatus	720	0.31
NPC	Jigz Padillo	658	0.28
Total votes		232,256	100%

Incumbent Vice Mayor Valeriano Encabo is term limited and running as board member, his party nominated Board Member Rex Mangubat, his opponent is Councilor Jess Frani.

Dasmariñas Vice Mayoralty Election
Party	Candidate	Votes	%
UNA	Jess Frani	101,909	45.26
NUP	Rex Mangubat	123,242	54.74
Total votes		225,151	100%

==== Fifth District ====
===== Carmona =====
Incumbent Mayor Dahlia A. Loyola will running reelection for her last term and is opposed by Rosa Atienza and Jose Carpio.

Carmona Mayoralty Election
Party	Candidate	Votes	%
PMP	Rosa Atienza	408	1.13 %
UNA	Jose Carpio	1,233	3.42 %
Liberal	Dahlia Loyola	34,443	95.45 %
Total votes		36,084	100.00 %

Carmona Vice Mayoralty Election
Party	Candidate	Votes	%
Liberal	Elmer "Itoy" Reyes	27,689	85.86 %
UNA	Lolita Tenedero	4,561	14.14 %
Total votes		32,250	100.00 %

===== General Mariano Alvarez =====
Incumbent Mayor Walter Echevarria Jr will running reelection and is opposed by incumbent vice mayor Percival "Percy" Cabuhat and former mayor Leonisa Joana "Ona" Virata.

General Mariano Alvarez Mayoralty Election
Party	Candidate	Votes	%
NPC	Percy Cabuhat	25,449	42.46
Liberal	Walter Echevarria, Jr.	28,862	48.15
PMP	Ona Virata	5,631	9.39
Total votes		59,942	100%

General Mariano Alvarez Vice Mayoralty Election
Party	Candidate	Votes	%
PMP	Ruel Calix	6,423	11.14
NPC	Aisa Gutierrez	23,697	41.13
Liberal	Maricel Torres	27,501	47.73
Total votes		57,621	100%

===== Silang =====
Silang Mayoralty Election
Party	Candidate	Votes	%
PGP	Gie Loyola	1,239	1.39
Liberal	Rosalie Loyola	33,510	37.43
UNA	Emilia Lourdes Poblete	54,768	61.18
Total votes		89,517	100%

Silang Vice Mayoralty Election
Party	Candidate	Votes	%
UNA	Aidel Paul Belamide	49,675	59.21
Liberal	Aristides Jose Velazco	34,221	40.79
Total votes		83,896	100%

==== Sixth District ====
===== Amadeo =====
Amadeo Mayoralty Election
Party	Candidate	Votes	%
Liberal	Albert Ambagan, Sr.	8,451	44.65
Nacionalista	Elpidio Bawalan	2,414	12.75
NPC	August Bayas	768	4.06
UNA	Benjarde Villanueva	7,294	38.54
Total votes		18,927	100%

Amadeo Vice Mayoralty Election
Party	Candidate	Votes	%
NPC	Augusto Bebe, Jr.	1,784	9.88
Liberal	Joel Iyaya	6,604	36.57
Nacionalista	Rene Tongson	2,316	12.83
UNA	Rading Viado	7,353	40.72
Total votes		18,057	100%

===== General Trias =====
Incumbent Mayor Antonio "Ony" Ferrer and Vice Mayor Maurito "Morit" Sison were challenged by Annalyn Jubillo and Reynaldo Parin respectively. As with the previous elections, it ended with a landslide victory for both Ferrer and Sison, and marked the first polls in the newly created city since the 2015 referendum.

General Trias Mayoralty Election
Party	Candidate	Votes	%
NUP	Antonio Ferrer	70,997	94.23
NPC	Annalyn Jubillo	4,348	5.77
Total votes		75,345	100%

General Trias Vice Mayoralty Election
Party	Candidate	Votes	%
NPC	Reynaldo Parin	6,902	9.60
NUP	Maurito Sison	65,004	90.40
Total votes		71,906	100%

===== Tanza =====
Tanza Mayoralty Election
Party	Candidate	Votes	%
Liberal	Hermogenes Arayata III	40,365	49.65
UNA	Yuri Pacumio	40,942	50.35
Total votes		81,307	100%

Tanza Vice Mayoralty Election
Party	Candidate	Votes	%
Liberal	Marcus Ashley Arayata	38,152	47.60
PDP–Laban	Joselito Diosana	10,935	13.64
UNA	Alexis Dones	31,070	38.76
Total votes		80,157	100%

===== Trece Martires =====
Trece Martires Mayoralty Election
Party	Candidate	Votes	%
UNA	Melandres De Sagun	26,052	56.30%
PDP–Laban	Romeo Montehermoso	16,165	35.00%
Liberal	Alex Peñalba	4,024	8.70%
Total votes		36,141	100.00%

Trece Martires Vice Mayoralty Election
Party	Candidate	Votes	%
Liberal	Remigio Dilag	20,888	45.90%
UNA	Alexander Lubigan	24,585	54.10%
Total votes		45,673	100.00%

==== Alfonso ====
Alfonso Mayoralty Election
Party	Candidate	Votes	%
Liberal	Raul Rodis	4,630	19.22
UNA	Virgilio Varias	19,463	80.78
Total votes		24,093	100%

Alfonso Vice Mayoralty Election
Party	Candidate	Votes	%
UNA	Justiniano De Castro	9,538	39.53
Liberal	Manolito Credo	2,530	10.49
PGP	Randy Salamat	12,060	49.98
Total votes		24,128	100%

==== General Emilio Aguinaldo ====
General Emilio Aguinaldo Mayoralty Election
Party	Candidate	Votes	%
UNA	Danilo Bencito	6,039	57.34
Liberal	Cesar Glorioso	4,492	42.66
Total votes		10,531	100%

General Emilio Aguinaldo Vice Mayoralty Election
Party	Candidate	Votes	%
Nacionalista	Louel Golfo	6,450	63.17
Liberal	Apolonio Villa	3,761	36.83
Total votes		10,211	100%

==== Indang ====
Indang Mayoralty Election
Party	Candidate	Votes	%
PMP	Eleuterio Castillo, Sr.	107	0.32
Lakas	Lilibeth Espineli	1,253	3.78
UNA	Pecto Fidel	13,779	41.52
Liberal	Virgilio Fidel	9,538	28.74
NPC	Iluminada Silao	4,962	14.95
PGP	Jaime Tepora	3,547	10.69
Total votes		33,186	100%

Indang Vice Mayoralty Election
Party	Candidate	Votes	%
PMP	Rafael Herrera, Jr.	3,531	11.06
Lakas	Raquel Quiambao	4,944	15.49
Liberal	Bayani Rodil	6,311	19.77
UNA	Sammy Rodil	9,209	28.85
NPC	Rey Zafra	7,926	24.83
Total votes		31,921	100%

==== Magallanes ====
Magallanes Mayoralty Election
Party	Candidate	Votes	%
Liberal	Delfin Genio	3,160	30.60
UNA	Jasmin Maligaya	7,166	69.40
Total votes		10,326	100%

Magallanes Vice Mayoralty Election
Party	Candidate	Votes	%
Liberal	Renato Dimapilis	5,696	56.86
UNA	Edwin Sisante	4,321	43.14
Total votes		10,017	100%

===== Maragondon =====
Maragondon Mayoralty Election
Party	Candidate	Votes	%
Liberal	Reynaldo Rillo	12,544	59.82
NUP	Alfredo Bersabe	8,427	40.18
Total votes		20,971	100%

Maragondon Vice Mayoralty Election
Party	Candidate	Votes	%
UNA	Irereo "Pinboy" Angeles	12,086	60.79
NUP	Bonn Rillo	7,796	39.21
Total votes		19,882	100%

==== Mendez (Mendez-Nuñez) ====
Incumbent Mayor Fredderick Vida is running unopposed.

Mendez Mayoralty Election
Party	Candidate	Votes	%
UNA	Fredderick Vida	12,957	100%
Total votes		12,957	100%
UNA hold			

Mendez Vice Mayoralty Election
Party	Candidate	Votes	%
NUP	Loida Dimapilis	5,474	37.00
UNA	Francisco Mendoza, Jr.	9,321	63.00
Total votes		14,795	100%

===== Naic =====
Incumbent Mayor Junio Dualan is running unopposed.

Naic Mayoralty Election
Party	Candidate	Votes	%
UNA	Junio Dualan	34,625	100%
Total votes		34,625	100%
UNA hold			

Naic Vice Mayoralty Election
Party	Candidate	Votes	%
UNA	Rodrigo Castillo	18,893	43.35
NUP	Roger Pangilinan	19,936	45.74
PDP–Laban	Joy Unas	4,757	10.91
Total votes		43,586	100%

===== Tagaytay =====
Both incumbent mayor Agnes Delgado-Tolentino, wife of incumbent 7th District representative Abraham "Bambol" Tolentino and sister-in-law of 2016 senatorial candidate Francis Tolentino, and running mate city councilor Raymond Ambion will be running unopposed.

Tagaytay Mayoralty Election
Party	Candidate	Votes	%
Liberal	Agnes Delgado-Tolentino	32,583	100%
Total votes		32,583	100%
Liberal hold			

Tagaytay Vice Mayoralty Election
Party	Candidate	Votes	%
Liberal	Raymund Ambion	28,982	100%
Total votes		29,982	100%
Liberal hold			

===== Ternate =====
Ternate Mayoralty Election
Party	Candidate	Votes	%
Liberal	Lamberto Bambao	4,206	36.77
NPC	Gomez Linayao, Jr.	2,612	22.83
UNA	Minio Lindo	4,622	40.40
Total votes		11,440	100%

Ternate Vice Mayoralty Election
Party	Candidate	Votes	%
UNA	Romel Anit	2,371	21.24
Liberal	Salvador Gubio, Jr.	4,817	43.15
NPC	Khalil Soberano	3,975	35.61
Total votes		11,163	100%
