= 2023 Cavite's 7th congressional district special election =

Special election for a Philippine House of Representatives seat

- February 25, 2023

Cavite's 7th congressional district Triggered by resignation of the incumbent
- Registered: 355,184
- Turnout: 42.11%
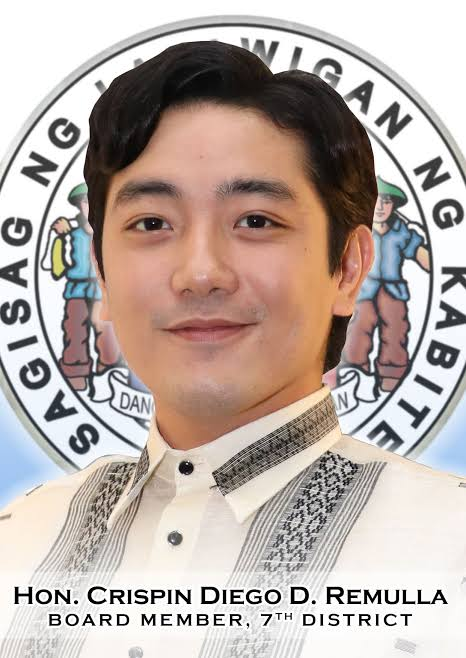

Candidate	Crispin Diego Remulla	Melencio de Sagun
Party	NUP	Independent
Popular vote	98,474	46,530
Percentage	66.68	31.51
- Results per secondary-level local government unit Remulla: 60–70% 70–80% 80–90%
House representative before election
Jesus Crispin Remulla
NUP
House representative-elect
Crispin Diego Remulla
NUP

A special election was held in Cavite's 7th congressional district on February 25, 2023, to fill the district's vacant seat in the House of Representatives of the Philippines for the remainder of the 19th Congress.

The vacancy arose when Jesus Crispin Remulla, the district's representative, opted to not take his seat in the 19th Congress to serve as the Secretary of Justice in the administration of President Bongbong Marcos. As a response, the House of Representatives passed a resolution urging the Commission on Elections to hold a special election to fill the vacancy.

Four candidates ran to fill the seat: Crispin Diego Remulla, an incumbent board member from the seventh district and a son of Jesus Crispin Remulla; Melencio de Sagun, a former mayor of Trece Martires; and independents Jose Angelito Aguinaldo and Michael Angelo Santos. Remulla won the election and succeeded his father.

== Electoral system ==
The House of Representatives is elected via parallel voting system, with 80% of seats elected from congressional districts, and 20% from the party-list system. Each district sends one representative to the House of Representatives. An election to the seat is via first-past-the-post, in which the candidate with the most votes, whether or not one has a majority, wins the seat.

Based on Republic Act (RA) No. 6645, in order for a special election to take place, the seat must be vacated, the relevant chamber notifies the Commission on Elections (COMELEC) the existence of a vacancy, then the COMELEC schedules the special election. There is a dispute in the procedure as a subsequent law, RA No. 7166, supposedly amended the procedure, bypassing the need for official communication from the relevant chamber of the vacancy. The COMELEC has always waited on official communication from the relevant chamber before scheduling a special election.

With a Supreme Court decision in 2025, this is the last special election where the commission has to wait for a congressional resolution to call for a special election.

Meanwhile, according to RA No. 8295, should only one candidate file to run in the special election, the COMELEC will declare that candidate as the winner and will no longer hold the election.

== Background ==
Jesus Crispin Remulla is part of a political dynasty in Cavite; his younger brother, Jonvic, served as the former province's governor from 2010 to 2016 and again from 2019 until 2024 before resigning to become the secretary of the interior and local government. Jesus Crispin Remulla represented the undivided 3rd district from 2004 to 2010 and the newly created 7th district from 2010 to 2013, served as the province's governor from 2016 to 2019, and returned to the House for the 7th district in 2019 before winning re-election unopposed in 2022. On May 23, 2022, almost two weeks after the election, Remulla was offered the position of secretary of justice under the incoming administration of then-president-elect Bongbong Marcos. He accepted the position, resigning his rights to the seat before his second consecutive term as a representative began in order to assume the office.

=== District profile ===
The 7th congressional district of Cavite

Cavite's 7th congressional district is composed of the province's de facto capital city of Trece Martires and the adjacent municipalities of Amadeo, Indang, and Tanza since 2019. The district's incumbent representative, Jesus Crispin Remulla, was unopposed in the 2022 general election, resulting in his re-election to a second term.

== Preparation ==
After the 19th Congress of the Philippines convened in late July, it passed a resolution urging the Commission on Elections to hold a special election to fill the vacancy. Prior to the passing of the resolution, the commission stated that it was ready to hold a special election for the seat. John Rex Laudiangco, the acting COMELEC spokesperson, stated that the special election is to be held in March 2023, should the 2022 barangay and Sangguniang Kabataan elections should continue as planned, otherwise it would be held in December 2022 or January 2023. After the barangay elections were postponed to October 2023, COMELEC chairperson George Garcia stated that they will hold the election in February 2023. Speaker Martin Romualdez (Leyte–1st) served as the district's caretaker while the seat was vacant.

COMELEC Resolution No. 10848 set the timetable for the election. The filing of candidacies began on December 5, 2022, and ended on the following day. As multiple candidates were accepted by the commission, the election was conducted as scheduled. On election day, each precinct had at least ten voting machines. The printing of ballots began on January 11, 2023. It was reported that the commission set up four "technical hubs" as part of an "enhanced continuity plan" to ensure the fluidity of the elections. Laudiangco reported that each of the hubs “is capable of reconfiguring within one minute any secure digital (SD) card which may present issues”. There were 365,184 eligible voters for the election.

== Candidates ==
A total of four persons filed to fill the vacant seat. Among the four, one is a member of the National Unity Party, and three are independents.

The following have filed certificates of candidacies, formally notifying the commission that they are running.

1. Jose Angelito Aguinaldo (Independent)
2. Melencio de Sagun (Independent), former mayor of Trece Martires (2001–2010).
3. Crispin Diego Remulla (NUP), incumbent Cavite Provincial Board member from the 7th district, and son of Jesus Crispin Remulla.
4. Michael Angelo Santos (Independent)

== Campaign ==
The campaign period for the special election candidates began on January 26, 2023, and concluded on February 23, 2023. Sagun launched his campaign by visiting four churches from the towns of Amadeo, Indang, Tanza, and Trece Matires.

All candidates signed a peace covenant at the Diocesan Shrine of Saint Augustine in Tanza on January 31, pledging to commit to a "peaceful election".

Sagun sued to disqualify Remulla days before the election, alleging public funds were used in his campaign. The commission clarified that a disqualification case does not remove that person from the ballot. Remulla declined to comment on the petition, while his father had derided the petition as a "desperate measure" by Sagun. Nonetheless, the COMELEC has stated that the petition would "undergo the right process based on existing regulations.

== Results ==
The vote-counting for the election was done using an automated system. The COMELEC expected to proclaim a winner in the morning following the election. George Garcia, chairman of the Commission on Elections, is a registered voter in the district and voted at Indang.

On February 26, COMELEC proclaimed Remulla as the winner, taking just over two-thirds of the vote, with a voter turnout of less than half of voters.

2023 Cavite's 7th congressional district special election
Candidate	Party	Votes	%	+/–
Crispin Diego Remulla	National Unity Party	98,474	66.68	−33.32
Melencio de Sagun	Independent	46,530	31.51	N/A
Jose Angelito Aguinaldo	Independent	1,610	1.09	N/A
Michael Angelo Santos	Independent	1,068	0.72	N/A
Total		147,682	100.00	–
Valid votes		147,682	98.73	+27.04
Invalid/blank votes		1,899	1.27	−27.04
Total votes		149,581	100.00	–
Registered voters/turnout		355,184	42.11	
Majority		51,944	35.17	−64.83
National Unity Party hold				

Results per city and municipality

City/Municipality	Remulla		De Sagun		Aguinaldo		Santos		Valid votes		
City/Municipality	Votes	%	Votes	%	Votes	%	Votes	%	Total	RVs	%
Amadeo	11,566	87.00	1,590	11.96	75	0.56	63	0.47	13,294	28,171	47.19
Indang	16,206	76.06	4,558	21.39	352	1.65	190	0.89	21,306	46,522	45.80
Tanza	38,734	61.41	23,040	36.53	962	1.53	335	0.53	63,071	159,950	39.43
Trece Martires	31,968	63.92	17,342	34.68	395	0.79	306	0.61	50,011	119,511	41.85
Total	98,474	66.68	46,530	31.51	1,610	1.09	1,068	0.72	147,682	354,154	41.70

== Aftermath ==
The National Citizens' Movement for Free Elections observed that while the administration of the election was orderly, paper jams were a common occurrence when voters fed their ballots to the voting machine, with voting machines shutting down also observed. The Philippine National Police noted that the exercise was peaceful and orderly. Meanwhile, George Garcia, chairman of the Commission on Elections, lamented the low voter turnout in the election.

"To a certain extent, it is regrettable for government to spend so much funds and then have a low voter turnout. I hope in elections like this, our countrymen will realize that the Comelec spent government funds and that they have a corresponding duty to fulfill by voting."

— George Garcia, in a media interview

Remulla was sworn into office at the Batasang Pambansa Complex on February 28, three days after winning the special election for Cavite's 7th congressional district. Shortly after his assumption of office, the National Unity Party designated his brother, Abeng Remulla, as his replacement in the Cavite Provincial Board.

In the lead-up to the 2025 elections, Remulla sought a full term in the House of Representatives. His candidacy came amid broader shifts in Cavite politics: following the resignation of Benhur Abalos as the secretary of the interior and local government, President Bongbong Marcos appointed Jonvic Remulla to the post, prompting the latter to withdraw from the gubernatorial race. Abeng Remulla subsequently substituted for his uncle and ran for governor.

Remulla ran against candidates Santos and Wally Abutin and successfully defended his seat in 2025. De Sagun, his opponent in the earlier special election, sought to return as mayor of Trece Martires but was unsuccessful.

== 2022 election result ==
2022 Philippine House of Representatives election at Cavite's 7th district
Candidate	Party	Votes	%
Jesus Crispin Remulla	National Unity Party	202,784	100.00
Total		202,784	100.00
Valid votes		202,784	71.69
Invalid/blank votes		80,065	28.31
Total votes		282,849	100.00
National Unity Party hold			

== See also ==
Other special elections in Cavite:

- 1909 Cavite's at-large Philippine Assembly district special election
- 1925 Cavite's at-large House of Representatives district special election
- 1929 Cavite's at-large House of Representatives district special election
- 2026 Cavite's 4th congressional district special election
