= 2026 Cavite's 4th congressional district special election =

Special election for a Philippine House of Representatives seat

- August 29, 2026

Cavite's 4th congressional district Triggered by expulsion of incumbent
- Registered: 447,387
- Turnout: 258,361 (57.75%)
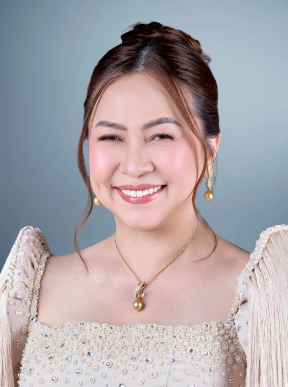

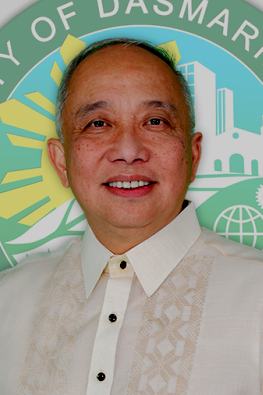

Candidate	Jenny Barzaga	Rex Mangubat	Jesse Frani
Party	NUP	Independent	PFP
Popular vote	201,893	30,373	24,350
Percentage	78.14%	11.76%	9.42%
House representative before election
Kiko Barzaga
PDP–Laban
Elected House representative
Jenny Barzaga
NUP

A special election was held in Cavite's 4th congressional district on August 29, 2026, to fill the district's vacant seat in the House of Representatives of the Philippines for the remainder of the 20th Congress.

The vacancy arose after Kiko Barzaga, the incumbent, was expelled from the House on June 2, 2026, due to disorderly conduct. This was the latest special election held in the province of Cavite since the 2023 Cavite's 7th congressional district special election, as well as the second to be held during the 20th Congress of the Philippines.

Barzaga's mother, Jenny, won the election, defeating four other candidates to serve the remainder of her son's term until June 30, 2028. She vacated her post as mayor of Dasmariñas to assume the position, which she had previously held from 2016 to 2019, and was succeeded by her other son and Kiko's younger brother, Elpidio Barzaga III.

== Background ==
Kiko Barzaga was elected under the National Unity Party (NUP) in the 2025 election, along with his mother Jenny and brother Elpidio "Third" Barzaga III as the city mayor and vice mayor, respectively.

Kiko Barzaga was expelled on June 2, 2026 by a 265–14 vote, with 8 abstentions by the House of Representatives due to disorderly behavior and conduct being a House member. Barzaga previously was suspended twice for 60 days.The Commission on Elections (COMELEC) said around ₱200 million (US$4.06 million) would be needed to conduct a special election after Barzaga's expulsion. COMELEC Chairman George Garcia said that the special election may be held in the district on August 22 or August 29, 2026, he noted that special elections should be held no earlier than 60 days and no later than 90 days after the vacancy of the post. Garcia clarified that Barzaga can run again in the special election, saying that his expulsion from the house does not mean that he is not allowed to run. Garcia said that the special election will not surpass the month of August due to the 2026 Bangsamoro Parliament election that will be held on September 14, 2026. On June 10, 2026, the COMELEC set the special election on August 29, 2026, Garcia said the he already wrote to President Bongbong Marcos requesting for the sourcing of ₱191 million (US$3.88 million) for the election. The Dasmariñas city government later donated ₱50 million (US$1.02 million) to the COMELEC, which was to be used to pay poll workers.

=== District overview ===
Map of Cavite showing the location of Dasmariñas

Cavite's 4th district is coextensive with the city of Dasmariñas. According to official COMELEC data from the 2025 midterm elections, the district had 432,844 registered voters.

Since Elpidio Barzaga Jr.'s successful election as representative of Cavite's 4th district in 2010, he, his wife Jenny, and their son Kiko have held the district's congressional seat. Elpidio Jr. had also previously represented the undivided 2nd district of Cavite from 2007 to 2010, when it included Dasmariñas prior to the implementation of the 2009 redistricting that created the current 4th district. He died on April 27, 2024, then House Speaker Martin Romualdez was designated as the caretaker of the district for the remainder of 19th Congress, as a special election to fill the seat was not possible due to the 2025 Philippine election just being a year away.

== Electoral system ==
The House of Representatives is elected via parallel voting system, with 80% of seats elected from congressional districts, and 20% from the party-list system. Each district sends one representative to the House of Representatives. An election to the seat is via first-past-the-post, in which the candidate with the most votes, whether or not one has a majority, wins the seat.

After the Hagedorn vs. House of Representatives decision by the Supreme Court in 2025, the Commission on Elections no longer has to wait for a congressional resolution to call for a special election. This was after the approval of Republic Act No. 7166, supposedly removed the condition of the chamber informing the commission of the vacancy, but the COMELEC still had always waited on the chamber's resolution before scheduling a special election.

Meanwhile, according to Republic Act No. 8295, should only one candidate file to run in the special election, the COMELEC will declare that candidate as the winner and will no longer hold the election.

== Candidates ==
The COMELEC set the filing of the certificates of candidacy from July 15 to 17, 2026.

=== Declared ===
- Jenny Barzaga (National Unity Party), mayor of Dasmariñas (since 2019; 2007−2016) and former representative of this district (2016−2019)
- Marvin Dupal-ag (Independent)
- Jesse Frani (Partido Federal ng Pilipinas), former member of Dasmariñas city council (2010–2016) and candidate for this district in 2025
- Raul Rex Mangubat (Independent), former vice mayor of Dasmariñas (2016–2025) and former member of the Cavite Provincial Board from the 4th District (2010–2016)
- Leysander Ordenes (Independent), candidate for this district in 2025

=== Endorsements ===
Jenny Barzaga (National Unity Party)

Politicians

- Kiko Barzaga, member of the House of Representatives of the Philippines from Cavite's 4th district (2025–2026), ex-officio member of the Cavite Provincial Board (2022–2025), member of the Dasmariñas City Council (2019–2025)
- Abeng Remulla, Governor of Cavite (2025–present) and former member of the Cavite Provincial Board (2023–2025)

== Conduct ==
Polling hours were set from 7:00AM PHT to 3:00PM PHT. Due to heavy rains caused by the southwest monsoon, voting was extended until 5:00PM.

== Result ==
2026 Cavite's 4th congressional district special election
Candidate	Party	Votes	%
Jenny Barzaga	National Unity Party	201,893	78.14
Rex Mangubat	Independent	30,373	11.76
Jesse Frani	Partido Federal ng Pilipinas	24,350	9.42
Marvin Dupal-ag	Independent	1,184	0.46
Leysander Ordenes	Independent	561	0.22
Total		258,361	100.00
Valid votes		258,361	100.00
Invalid/blank votes		0	0.00
Total votes		258,361	100.00
Registered voters/turnout		447,387	57.75
NUP gain from PDP–Laban			
Source: Philippine Daily Inquirer

== Aftermath ==
Jenny Barzaga was sworn in as congressional representative on September 1.

== 2025 election result ==
2025 Philippine House of Representatives election in Cavite's 4th congressional district
Candidate	Party	Votes	%
Kiko Barzaga	National Unity Party	165,942	50.37
Jesse Frani	Independent	150,316	45.63
Osmundo Calupad	Independent	9,583	2.91
Leysander Ordenes	Partido Lakas ng Masa	3,591	1.09
Total		329,432	100.00
Valid votes		329,432	93.65
Invalid/blank votes		22,325	6.35
Total votes		351,757	100.00
Registered voters/turnout		432,844	81.27
National Unity Party hold			
Source: Commission on Elections (COMELEC)

== See also ==
Other special elections in Cavite:

- 1909 Cavite's at-large Philippine Assembly district special election
- 1925 Cavite's at-large House of Representatives district special election
- 1929 Cavite's at-large House of Representatives district special election
- 2023 Cavite's 7th congressional district special election
