= Mayor of Lucena =

Local chief executive of Lucena City, Philippines

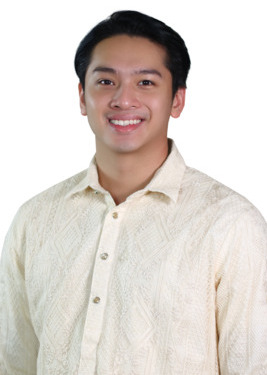
- Incumbent; Mark Don Victor B. Alcala since June 30, 2022
- Style: The Honorable
- Appointer: Elected via popular vote
- Term length: 3 years
- Formation: 1902

The Mayor of Lucena (Filipino: Punong Lungsod ng Lucena) is the head of the local government of the city of Lucena City, Quezon who is elected to three year terms. The Mayor is also the executive head and leads the city's departments in executing the city ordinances and improving public services. The city mayor is restricted to three consecutive terms, totaling nine years, although a mayor can be elected again after an interruption of one term.

== Municipal Mayors (1902–1961) ==
	Mayor	Term	Political Party
1	Gabriel Cord	1902–1903	
2	Gregorio Marquez	1903–1904	
3	Juan Carmona	1904–1906	
4	Venancio Queblar	1906–1910; 1925–1928	
5	Feliciano Zoleta	1910–1912	
6	Fortunato Alvarez	1912–1916	
7	Pedro Nieva	1916–1922	
8	Jose Nava	1922–1925	
9	Domingo Gamboa	1928–1931	
10	Fernando Barcelona	1931–1934	
11	Melecio Custodio	1934–1937	
12	Anselmo Nadres Jr.	1937–1938	
13	Pedro Torres	1938–1940	
14	Federico V. Marquez	1940–1943; 1945–1946	
15	Jose Mendoza	1943–1944	
16	Teotimo Atienza	1944–1945	
17	Julian Zoleta	1945	
18	Honorio Abadilla	1946–1947; 1952–1955	
19	Amando Zaballero	1947–1952	
20	Casto T. Profugo	1955–1960	

== City mayors (since 1961) ==
	Image	Mayor	Term	Political Party
1		Casto T. Profugo	1961–1963	
2		Mario L. Tagarao	1963–1986	
3		Euclides Abcede	1986–1987	
4		Romeo Mendoza	1987	
5		Julio T. Alzona	1987–1988	
6		Cesar Zaballero	1988–1992	
7		Ramon Y. Talaga Jr.	1992–1998; 2000–2010	Lakas–CMD
8		Bernard G. Tagarao	1998–2000	
9		Barbara "Ruby" C. Talaga	2010–2012	Lakas–CMD
10		Roderick "Dondon" A. Alcala	2012–2022	Liberal
10		Roderick "Dondon" A. Alcala	2012–2022	PDP-Laban
11		Mark Don Victor B. Alcala	2022–present	PDP-Laban
11		Mark Don Victor B. Alcala	2022–present	Stan Q
