= Rex Mangubat =

Filipino politician

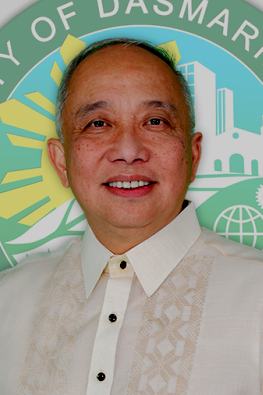
- Portrait of Mangubat as vice mayor of Dasmariñas

Vice Mayor of Dasmariñas
- In office June 30, 2016 – June 30, 2025
- Mayor: Elpidio Barzaga Jr. (2016–2019); Jenny Barzaga (2019–2025)
- Preceded by: Valeriano Encabo
- Succeeded by: Third Barzaga

Member of the Cavite Provincial Board
- In office June 30, 2010 – June 30, 2016

Member of the Dasmariñas City Council
- In office June 30, 2004 – June 30, 2010

Personal details
- Born: Raul Rex del Rosario Mangubat
- Party: Independent (2026–present)
- Other political affiliations: NUP (2011–2019; 2022–2025); PDP–Laban (2019–2022); Lakas (2008); KAMPI (2007–2008); PMP (2004–2007)
- Relations: Dominador Mangubat (grandfather)

Raul Rex del Rosario Mangubat is a Filipino politician who served as vice mayor of Dasmariñas from 2016 to 2025. Currently an independent, he also served as a member of the Cavite Provincial Board from 2010 to 2016, and member of the Dasmariñas City Council from 2004 to 2010. In 2026, he ran for the city's seat in the House of Representatives in a special election, placing second to Mayor Jenny Barzaga.

== Early life ==
Mangubat was born to former police general Dominador Mangubat Jr. and is the grandson of former Cavite governor Dominador Mangubat. In Dasmariñas, he is known locally as "VM Rex" or "Kuya Rex".

== Early political career (2004–2016) ==
Mangubat began his political career upon his election as a member of the Dasmariñas Municipal Council in 2004 under the Pwersa ng Masang Pilipino (PMP) party, and was successfully re-elected in 2007 under Kabalikat ng Malayang Pilipino (KAMPI). He emerged as the top-ranking councilor in consecutive elections. Dasmariñas became a component city during his second term, in 2009.

In 2010, he ran for the Cavite Provincial Board under Lakas–CMD, representing the province's 4th district, which encompassed Dasmariñas. He was re-elected in 2013 under the National Unity Party (NUP), which was co-founded by Dasmariñas city mayor Elpidio Barzaga Jr. From 2010 to 2016, he chaired the provincial board's Committee on Finance, Budget and Appropriations.

== Vice mayor of Dasmariñas (2016–2025) ==
Mangubat ran and won as Barzaga Jr.'s running mate for vice mayor of Dasmariñas in the 2016 elections under the NUP ticket. When Barzaga Jr. ran for the House of Representatives in 2019, Mangubat was selected as his wife Jenny's running mate for vice mayor. He ran under the PDP–Laban banner and won. Mangubat sought a third term as vice mayor in 2022, rejoining the NUP, and won against Valeriano Encabo and Teodorico Remulla, who both ran as independents. As vice mayor, he presided over the city council.

Mangubat's third consecutive term ended in 2025, and he was succeeded by Jenny Barzaga's son, Elpidio "Third" Barzaga III.

== Congressional bid (2026) ==
Jenny Barzaga's son, Kiko, ran for the city's congressional seat in the House of Representatives in 2025 and won. He was first suspended by the House for 60 days in December 2025 for repeated reckless social media behavior, before being suspended again in February 2026. He was expelled on June 2, 2026, by a vote of 265–14–8, becoming the second lawmaker in Philippine history to be expelled from the House.

In June 2026, supporters began urging Mangubat to run for the vacant seat on social media and in community chat groups. He said he was studying his next steps. Former congressman Gilbert Remulla was also reported as a possible contender.

Mangubat was the first to file his certificate of candidacy (COC) for the special election held on August 29, 2026 to fill the vacant seat, filing it on July 15, the first day of filing, at the Dasmariñas New City Hall. He ran as an independent against incumbent Dasmariñas mayor Jenny Barzaga, former city councilor Jesse Frani, and two other independent candidates, Marvin Dupal-ag and Leysander Ordenes.

Mangubat faced criticism for running against the family of Barzaga Jr., with whom he had served. In response, he said he remained grateful to Barzaga Jr. for opening the door to public service for him, but that public service was not a lifelong political debt, and that his candidacy was not a rejection of Barzaga Jr.'s legacy.

Mangubat ran on a platform of support for the anti-political dynasty bill, local healthcare reform, and improvements to city-wide water supply services. He named healthcare as his first priority, citing the many families relocated to the city from Metro Manila who could not afford hospital care or medicine, followed by shortages and inconsistency in the city's water supply. His campaign slogan was "Challenge accepted para sa Dasmariñas".

Mangubat conceded on the night of the election, based on partial and unofficial results, and congratulated Barzaga. He was defeated by Barzaga by a wide margin, receiving 30,373 of the 258,371 votes cast; Frani placed third with 24,350 votes. Turnout was 57.75 percent of the district's 447,387 registered voters.

== Electoral history ==
Electoral history of Rex Mangubat
Year	Office	Party	Votes received				Result
Year	Office	Party	Total	%	P.	Swing	Result
2004	Councilor (Dasmariñas)	PMP	—N/a	—N/a	1st	—N/a	Won
2007	Councilor (Dasmariñas)	KAMPI	—N/a	—N/a	1st	—N/a	Won
2010	Provincial Board Member (Cavite–4th)	Lakas	93,597	32.39%	1st	—N/a	Won
2013	Provincial Board Member (Cavite–4th)	NUP	97,019	48.96%	2nd	+16.57	Won
2016	Vice Mayor of Dasmariñas	NUP	123,242	54.74%	1st	—N/a	Won
2019	Vice Mayor of Dasmariñas	PDP–Laban	178,627	77.33%	1st	+22.59	Won
2022	Vice Mayor of Dasmariñas	NUP	139,320	45.88%	1st	−31.45	Won
2026	Representative (Cavite–4th)	Independent	30,373	11.76%	2nd	—N/a	Lost

Political offices
Preceded by Valeriano Encabo	Vice Mayor of Dasmariñas; June 30, 2016 – June 30, 2025	Succeeded by Third Barzaga
