= Recto Cantimbuhan =

Filipino politician (born 1950)

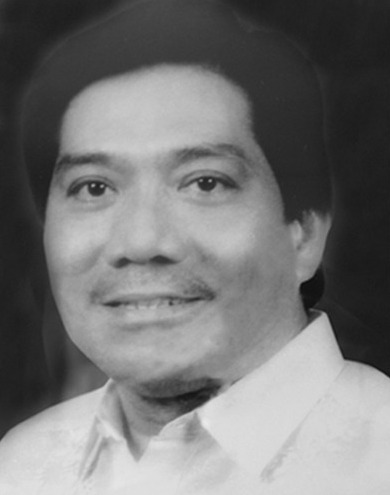
- Portrait as Mayor of Dasmariñas

Vice Governor of Cavite
- In office June 30, 2010 – June 30, 2013
- Governor: Jonvic Remulla
- Preceded by: Dencito Campaña
- Succeeded by: Jolo Revilla

Mayor of Dasmariñas
- In office February 2, 1988 – June 30, 1998
- Preceded by: Roberto Cantimbuhan
- Succeeded by: Elpidio Barzaga Jr.
- In office 1982–1986
- Preceded by: Narciso Guevarra
- Succeeded by: Elpidio Barzaga Jr. (OIC)

Member of the Cavite Provincial Board
- In office June 30, 2004 – June 30, 2007

Personal details
- Born: Recto Meñez Cantimbuhan; December 8, 1950 (age 75) Dasmariñas, Cavite, Philippines
- Party: Independent (from 2013)
- Other political affiliations: Liberal (2007–2013); LDP (1992–2007); KBL (1982–1986)

Recto Meñez Cantimbuhan (born December 8, 1950) is a Filipino politician who served as vice governor of Cavite from 2010 to 2013. He previously served as mayor of Dasmariñas from 1982 to 1986 and again from 1988 to 1998.

In 2010, Cantimbuhan was elected vice governor of Cavite under the Liberal Party as the running mate of gubernatorial candidate Dencito Campaña, who was defeated by Jonvic Remulla. He sought re-election in 2013, but was dropped as the Liberal Party's nominee in favor of Ronald Jay Lacson and subsequently ran unsuccessfully as an independent candidate.
