= 2025 Dasmariñas local elections =

Election in Cavite

- May 12, 2025
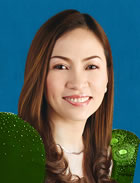
Nominee	Jennifer Barzaga	Valeriano Encabo
Party	NUP	Reporma
Running mate	Elpidio Barzaga III	Romulo Rementilla
Popular vote	260,308	65,797
Percentage	78.12	19.75
Mayor before election
Jennifer Barzaga
NUP
Elected Mayor
Jennifer Barzaga
NUP

Local elections were held in the city of Dasmariñas on May 12, 2025 together with the national and provincial level elections. The voters elected their local and provincial officials which includes: two provincial board members, congressional representative, mayor, vice mayor, and twelve city council members at-large.

== Background ==
Rep. Elpidio Barzaga Jr. passed away on April 27, 2024. Then-House Speaker and Leyte First District Rep. Ferdinand Martin Romualdez was named as the legislative caretaker. No special elections were held and his seat remained vacant. His seat was contested by Councilor Francisco Barzaga, Osmundo Calupad, former Councilor Jacinto Frani Jr., and Leysander Ordenes.

Board Members Nickanor Austria Jr. and Fulgencio Dela Cuesta Jr. ran for re-election. Other candidates were Eleuterio Guimbaolibot and Ma. Niña Trinidad.

Mayor Jennifer Barzaga ran for re-election. She was challenged by former Vice Mayor Valeriano Encabo, Jonathan Fernando, and Hadassah Tapiru.

Vice Mayor Raul Rex Mangubat was on his second term. He didn't ran for re-election. His place was contested by Elpidio Barzaga III, Joel Musa, and Romulo Rementilla.

== Results ==
Names displayed in italics are incumbents re-elected.

=== For Provincial Board Member ===
Board Members Nickanor "Nickol" Austria Jr. and Fulgencio "Jun" Dela Cuesta Jr. were re-elected.

Provincial Board Election at Cavite's Fourth District
Party	Candidate	Votes	%
NUP	Nickanor Austria Jr.	191,691	43.18
NUP	Fulgencio Dela Cuesta Jr.	151,960	34.23
Reporma	Eleuterio Guimbaolibot	54,560	12.29
Independent	Ma. Niña Trinidad	45,707	10.30
Total votes		443,918	100.00
NUP hold			

=== For Representative ===
Councilor Francisco Barzaga won in a tight election against his father's cousin, former Councilor Jacinto Frani Jr.

Congressional Elections at Cavite's Fourth District
Party	Candidate	Votes	%
NUP	Francisco Barzaga	165,942	50.37
Independent	Jacinto Frani Jr.	150,316	45.63
Independent	Osmundo Calupad	9,583	2.91
PLM	Leysander Ordenes	3,591	1.09
Total votes		329,432	100.00
NUP hold			

=== For Mayor ===
Mayor Jennifer Barzaga won the elections with a huge margin against former Vice Mayor Valeriano Encabo.

Dasmariñas Mayoralty Elections
Party	Candidate	Votes	%
NUP	Jennifer Barzaga	260,308	78.12
Reporma	Valeriano Encabo	65,797	19.75
Independent	Jonathan Fernando	6,228	1.87
PM	Hadassah Tapiru	871	0.26
Total votes		333,204	100.00
NUP hold			

=== For Vice Mayor ===
Neophyte Elpidio Barzaga III won the elections.

Dasmariñas Vice Mayoralty Elections
Party	Candidate	Votes	%
NUP	Elpidio Barzaga III	245,088	77.86
Reporma	Romulo Rementilla	49,784	15.82
Independent	Joel Musa	19,911	6.33
Total votes		314,783	100.00
NUP hold			

=== For City Councilors ===
Voters elected twelve city council members at-large.

Dasmariñas City Council Elections
Party	Candidate	Votes	%
NUP	Teofilo Lara	196,258	45.34
NUP	Reynaldo Canaynay	193,234	44.64
NUP	Robin Chester Cantimbuhan	178,096	41.15
NUP	Daisy Lyn Alvarez	162,307	37.50
NUP	Kevin Tapawan	147,594	34.10
NUP	Jerome Napoleon Gonzales	142,174	32.85
NUP	Roderick Atienza	142,089	32.83
NUP	Glenn Wynne Malihan	138,140	31.91
NUP	Jorge Carlo Magno	135,357	31.27
NUP	Azlie Guro	135,109	31.21
NUP	Fernando Laudato	130,896	30.24
Independent	Resty Encabo	127,097	29.36
NUP	Moises Menguito	105,201	24.30
Independent	Nielson Coleta	86,146	19.90
Independent	Arnel Del Rosario	84,321	19.48
Independent	Vladimir Maliksi	79,011	18.25
Akbayan	Nemerlito Perez	48,417	11.19
Reporma	Irineo Mendoza	47,760	11.03
Reporma	Rey Balibago	46,588	10.76
Reporma	Jannus Toledo	45,063	10.41
Reporma	Domgelio Tagle	40,845	9.44
Independent	Reynaldo Trinidad	37,313	8.62
Reporma	Jeanneth Velarde	36,062	8.33
Independent	Norma Salcedo	32,946	7.61
Reporma	Edgardo Escano	31,241	7.22
Reporma	Chester Geda	30,724	7.10
Reporma	Marcelo Apostol	28,895	6.68
Reporma	Marlon Sinigayan	28,309	6.54
Independent	Ronald Famindalan	27,914	6.45
Reporma	Jeremiah Hernan Denolo	27,525	6.36
Independent	Lorna Rescate	26,656	6.16
Independent	Virginia Pasaporte	22,653	5.21
Independent	Mac Neil Ivan Tumacay	22,384	5.17
Independent	Arnulfo Siriban	22,175	5.12
Independent	Antonio Tianela	18,974	4.38
Total votes			
