= Dasmariñas City Council =

City council of Dasmariñas, Philippines

Dasmariñas City Council Sangguniang Panlungsod ng Dasmariñas
- 5th Dasmariñas City Council

Type
- Type: Unicameral
- Term limits: 3 terms (9 years)

Leadership
- Presiding Officer: Teofilo Lara, NUP since September 1, 2026

Structure
- Seats: 14 councilors and 1 presiding officer
- Political groups: National Unity Party (10) Independent (1) Nonpartisan (2)
- Length of term: 3 years
- Authority: Dasmariñas City Charter; Local Government Code of the Philippines

Elections
- Voting system: Plurality-at-large voting
- Last election: May 12, 2025
- Next election: May 8, 2028

Meeting place
- Dasmariñas City Hall

The City Council of Dasmariñas (Filipino: Sangguniang Panglungsod ng Dasmariñas) is the legislature of the City of Dasmariñas, Cavite. It is composed of 15 members including 12 elected members, 2 ex officio members and 1 presiding officer. They are elected to serve a three-year term, with a maximum of three terms.

The ex officio members are the Association of Liga ng mga Barangay ng Dasmariñas (English: League of Barangays of Dasmariñas) President and the Sangguniang Kabataan (English: Youth Council) Federation President.

The vice mayor is the presiding officer of the city council. He is also the chief executive of the city whenever the mayor is out of the city. He is elected to serve a three-year term, with a maximum of three terms. The incumbent vice mayor is Rex Mangubat, incumbent since 2016.

The city council meets at the City of Dasmariñas.

== Current Members ==
These are the members after the 2025 elections and the elevation of Vice Mayor Elpidio Barzaga III as mayor on September 1, 2026:

Position	Name	Party
Presiding Officer	Teofilo Lara	NUP
City; Councilors	Vacant	
City; Councilors	Reynaldo Canaynay	NUP
City; Councilors	Robin Chester Cantimbuhan	NUP
City; Councilors	Daisy Lyn Alvarez	NUP
City; Councilors	Kevin Tapawan	NUP
City; Councilors	Jerome Napoleon Gonzales	NUP
City; Councilors	Roderick Atienza	NUP
City; Councilors	Glenn Wynne Malihan	NUP
City; Councilors	Jorge Carlo Magno	NUP
City; Councilors	Azlie Guro	NUP
City; Councilors	Fernando Laudato	NUP
City; Councilors	Resty Encabo	Independent
ABC President	Antonio Ferrer	Nonpartisan
SK Federation President	Jedrick Narvaez	Nonpartisan

== Past Members ==
2022-2025 Membership
Position	Name	Party
Presiding Officer	Raul Rex D. Mangubat	PDP–Laban
City; Councilors	Teofilo B. Lara	NUP
City; Councilors	Reynaldo C. Canaynay	NUP
City; Councilors	Robin Chester J. Cantimbuhan	NUP
City; Councilors	Francisco A. Barzaga	NUP
City; Councilors	Martin John T. Reyes	NUP
City; Councilors	Jorge Magno	NUP
City; Councilors	Doc Kevin P. Tapawan	NUP
City; Councilors	Jeg Gonzales	NUP
City; Councilors	Eric S. Aledia	NUP
City; Councilors	Aquino I. Garcia	NUP
City; Councilors	Mamerto B. Noora, Jr.	NUP
City; Councilors	Glenn Wynne S. Malihan	NUP
ABC President	TBA	Nonpartisan
SK Federation President	TBA	Nonpartisan

2019-2022 Membership
Position	Name	Party
Presiding Officer	Raul Rex R. Mangubat	NUP
City; Councilors	Teofilo B. Lara	NUP
City; Councilors	Resty M. Encabo	NUP
City; Councilors	Robin Chester J. Cantimbuhan	NUP
City; Councilors	Francisco A. Barzaga	NUP
City; Councilors	Martin John T. Reyes	NUP
City; Councilors	Jerome Napoleon T. Gonzales	PDP–Laban
City; Councilors	Kevin P. Tapawan	NUP
City; Councilors	Jorge Carlo D. Magno	PDP–Laban
City; Councilors	Eric S. Aledia	NUP
City; Councilors	Aquino I. Garcia	NUP
City; Councilors	Mamerto B. Noora, Jr.	NUP
City; Councilors	Glenn Wynne S. Malihan	NUP
ABC President		Nonpartisan
SK Federation President		Nonpartisan

2016-2019 Membership
Position	Name
Presiding Officer of the City Council of Dasmariñas	Vice Mayor Raul Rex R. Mangubat
Councilors of the City of Dasmariñas	Robin Chester J. Cantimbuhan
Councilors of the City of Dasmariñas	Reynaldo C. Canaynay
Councilors of the City of Dasmariñas	Restituto Encabo
Councilors of the City of Dasmariñas	Jacinto B. Frani, Jr.
Councilors of the City of Dasmariñas	Roderick Marquinez Atienza, Sr.
Councilors of the City of Dasmariñas	Peter-Tom B. Antonio
Councilors of the City of Dasmariñas	Nicanor Austria, Jr.
Councilors of the City of Dasmariñas	Tagumpay Tapawan, M.D.
Councilors of the City of Dasmariñas	Fulgencio C. de la Cuesta, Jr.
Councilors of the City of Dasmariñas	Teofilo F. Campaño
Councilors of the City of Dasmariñas	Napoleon F. Gonzales
Councilors of the City of Dasmariñas	Angelo Hugo
President of the League of Barangays: Dasmariñas Chapter	Jorge Magno
President of the Youth Council Federation: Dasmariñas Chapter	Jerome M. Menguito

== Standing Committees ==
There are 20 standing committees in the city council each headed by a city councilor.

Committee	Chairman
Agriculture, Market and Slaughter House	TBC
Barangay Affairs	TBC
Cooperatives	TBC
Education, Culture and Social Welfare	TBC
Environment Protection	TBC
Finance, Budget and Appropriation	TBC
Games and Amusements	TBC
Health and Sanitation	TBC
Housing and Land Utilization	TBC
Human Resources	TBC
Human Rights	TBC
Infrastructure and Public Works	TBC
Labor and Employment	TBC
Livelihood and Urban Poor	TBC
Ordinances and Legal Matters	TBC
Peace and Order and Public Safety	TBC
Rules and Privileges	TBC
Senior Citizen’s Affairs	TBC
Trade and Industry	TBC
Transportation and Communication	TBC
Ways and Means	TBC
Women and Family	TBC
Youth and Sports Development	TBC
