= Legislative districts of Dasmariñas =

The legislative district of Dasmariñas was the representation of the city of Dasmariñas, Cavite in the House of Representatives of the Philippines. The district corresponds to the 4th Legislative District of Cavite, which was created on October 22, 2009 just right before the ratification of the Charter of the City of Dasmariñas on November 25, 2009. Prior to being entitled its own representation, the municipality of Dasmariñas was represented in Congress as part of the lone district of Cavite from 1907 to 1972, and as part of Region IV-A in the Interim Batasang Pambansa from 1978 to 1984. From 1984 to 1986, it was represented at the Batasang Pambansa as part of the at-large district of Cavite, and was part of the second district of Cavite in the restored House of Representatives from 1987 to 2010.

With the reapportionment of Cavite into eight legislative districts by way of Republic Act No. 11069 signed into law on September 17, 2018, the lone district of Dasmariñas has effectively ceased existence and has reverted to being officially considered as the Fourth District of Cavite.

== Lone District (defunct) ==
- Population (2015): 659,019
- Land Area (km²): 90.13

Period	Representative
15th Congress; 2010–2013	Elpidio F. Barzaga, Jr.
16th Congress; 2013–2016	Elpidio F. Barzaga, Jr.
17th Congress; 2016–2019	Jennifer A. Barzaga

== See also ==
- Dasmariñas
- Legislative districts of Cavite
