= Jun Abaya =

Filipino politician and former train administrator

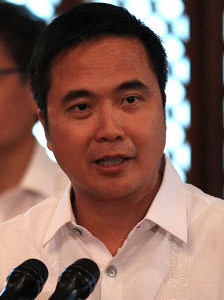

Secretary of Transportation and Communications
- In office October 18, 2012 – June 30, 2016
- President: Benigno Aquino III
- Preceded by: Mar Roxas
- Succeeded by: Arthur Tugade (as Secretary of Transportation)

Member of the Philippine House of Representatives from Cavite's 1st congressional district
- In office June 30, 2004 – October 18, 2012
- Preceded by: Plaridel Abaya
- Succeeded by: Francis Gerald Abaya

15th President of the Liberal Party
- In office October 1, 2012 – August 7, 2016
- Preceded by: Mar Roxas
- Succeeded by: Francis Pangilinan

Personal details
- Born: Joseph Emilio Aguinaldo Abaya; May 28, 1966 (age 60) Cavite, Philippines
- Party: Liberal
- Spouse: Rowena Abesamis
- Relations: Emilio Aguinaldo (great-grandfather); Hilaria Aguinaldo (great-grandmother)
- Children: 3
- Education: University of the Philippines Diliman; Philippine Military Academy; United States Naval Academy (BS); Cornell University (MS); Ateneo de Manila University (JD)
- Occupation: Politician
- Profession: Lawyer

Military service
- Allegiance: Philippines
- Branch/service: Philippine Navy
- Years of service: 1984–2004
- Rank: Officer (1988–2004); Cadet (1984–1988)

Joseph Emilio "Jun" Aguinaldo Abaya (born May 28, 1966) is a Filipino politician, lawyer, and military officer. He was the Secretary of the Department of Transportation and Communications (DOTC) of the Philippines under the administration of President Benigno Aquino III. A member of the Liberal Party, he has been elected to three terms as a member of the Philippine House of Representatives, representing the 1st District of Cavite. He first won election to the House in 2004, and was re-elected in 2007. He and other Aquino administration officials have been charged over the alleged anomalous contracts for the MRT Line 3 during their tenure.

== Early life and education ==
Abaya is the great-grandson of the first Philippine president, Emilio Aguinaldo through his granddaughter, Consuelo Aguinaldo, daughter of his son, Emilio Aguinaldo Jr., and the descendant of Isabelo Abaya, the revolutionary hero and founding father of Candon, Ilocos Sur. He is also the second son of the three-term Congressman Plaridel M. Abaya.

Abaya finished his elementary education at the Basic Education Unit of the De La Salle University in 1979. During his secondary schooling, he was a consistent honor student at the Philippine Science High School Main Campus, and he became a university and college scholar of the University of the Philippines where he took his engineering studies. After a year in UP, he took and topped the entrance examination for the Philippine Military Academy that he was sent by the government to the US Naval Academy (USNA) in Annapolis, Maryland where he earned his Bachelor of Science degree in mathematics (1988) with distinction of being a consistent Dean's Lister in all the semesters he was there. Jun then proceeded to Cornell University in Ithaca, New York, and completed a master's degree in electrical engineering (1989 – he was also a fellowship awardee). He was the vice president of PMA Maringal Class of 1988 and is a member of the Phi Kappa Phi honor society and Friends of Aguinaldo Shrine.

He received his Juris Doctor degree from the law school of Ateneo de Manila University in April 2005. He was admitted to the Philippine Bar in 2007.

== Political career ==
Prior to representing the first district of Cavite to the House of Representatives in 2004, he first served in the Armed Forces of the Philippines as a cadet (1984–1988) and as a naval officer of the Philippine Navy (1988–2004).

He ran for congressman in 2004 and won against Jeffrey Sescon Uy and represented the 1st District of Cavite to the 13th Congress of the Philippines. He was re-elected in the 2007 elections. During the 14th Congress, he was chairman of the House Committee on Science and Technology. He was also co-chairman of the Joint Congressional Committee on Science and Technology and Engineering with Sen. Edgardo Angara.

In 2009, he among with fellow representatives of Cavite – Elpidio Barzaga, Jr. and Jesus Crispin Remulla — authored the biggest congressional reapportionment in the history of the Philippines by passing Republic Act No. 9727, unofficially titled The Cavite Congressional Reapportionment Act of 2009, bringing the representatives of Cavite from three to seven.

During the 15th Congress and on his last term, he served as the chairman of House Committee on Appropriations.

On October 12, 2012, Abaya was appointed by Benigno Aquino III as the Secretary of Transportation and Communications, succeeding Mar Roxas.

In February 2016, the Philippine Senate released a report stating that Abaya and other DOTC officials "may have violated" the Anti-Graft and Corrupt Practices Act in relation to questionable contracts with the subsequent maintenance providers. In a Senate report where the line's condition was found to be in "poor maintenance" as per studies made by MTR HK, DOTC officials were reported to be involved in graft in relation to questionable contracts, especially those for the maintenance of the line.

Abaya stepped down on June 30, 2016, after Aquino's term ended.

House of Representatives of the Philippines
| Preceded by Plaridel Abaya | Member of the House of Representatives from Cavite's 1st district 2004–2012 | Vacant Title next held by Francis Gerald Abaya |
Government offices
| Preceded by Mar Roxas | Secretary of Transportation and Communications; 2012–2016 | Succeeded by Arthur Tugade as Secretary of Transportation |
Party political offices
| Preceded by Mar Roxas | President of the Liberal Party; 2012–2016 | Succeeded by Francis Pangilinan |
