= Legislative districts of Cavite City =

The legislative district of Cavite City was the representation of Cavite City in the National Assembly of the Japanese-sponsored Second Philippine Republic from 1943 to 1944. As with other provinces and chartered cities at the time, the representatives of Cavite City to the National Assembly consisted of the local chief executive (provincial governor or city mayor) acting in an ex officio capacity, and another representative indirectly elected through local conventions of KALIBAPI members during the Japanese occupation of the Philippines.

== At-Large (defunct) ==
| Period | Representatives |
|---|---|
| National Assembly; 1943–1944 | Demetrio B. Encarnacion |
| National Assembly; 1943–1944 | Ricardo Poblete (ex officio) |

== See also ==
- Legislative districts of Cavite
