= Plaridel Abaya =

Filipino politician (born 1934)

Member of the Philippine House of Representatives from Cavite's 1st congressional district
- In office June 30, 1995 – June 30, 2004
- Preceded by: Dominador G. Nazareno, Jr.
- Succeeded by: Joseph Emilio Abaya

Personal details
- Born: Plaridel Madarang Abaya; February 25, 1934 (age 92) Candon, Ilocos Sur, Philippine Islands
- Party: Liberal (2006–present)
- Other political affiliations: Independent (2003–2006); NPC (1994–2003); LDP (1991–1994)
- Spouse: Consuelo Aguinaldo
- Children: 6 (including Francis Gerald and Joseph Emilio)
- Education: University of the Philippines (A.A.) (LL. B.)

Military service
- Allegiance: Philippines
- Branch/service: Armed Forces of the Philippines
- Years of service: 1959-1987 (28 years)

Plaridel Abaya (born Plaridel Madarang Abaya on February 25, 1934) is a Filipino politician who served as the representative of Cavite's 1st congressional district from 1995 to 2004. He also unsuccessfully ran for congressman representing Cavite's 2nd congressional district in 2010.

== Career ==
He started his career at the Philippine Military Academy as a cadet in 1959. He served in the Philippine Army for 28 years. He completed his career in 1987 as a full colonel. He started his political career in 1995, when he represented Cavite's 1st congressional district in the 10th Congress of the Philippines. He gained a second term in 1998, and his third and final consecutive term in 2001. He was succeeded by his son.

=== 2010 Cavite run ===
He ran in the 2010 Philippine House of Representatives elections in Cavite's 2nd congressional district under the Liberal Party of the Philippines. He gained 55,088 votes, 38.00 percent of the votes, losing to Lani Mercado. Abaya gained a charge after he and his four bodyguards allegedly caused a shootout outside a police station that left two people killed from Abaya's side. Presidential and Vice Presidential Candidates Benigno Aquino III and Mar Roxas condemned the killing of the two.

== Personal life ==
Abaya was married to Consuelo Aguinaldo-Abaya, the granddaughter of former Philippine President Emilio Aguinaldo and the daughter of Emilio del Rosario Aguinaldo Jr. and they have 6 children including Francis Gerald and Joseph Emilio. He has a son named Paul Plaridel, who ran for congressman in the 2022 elections but lost to Jolo Revilla, ending the Abaya political dynasty in the Cavite 1st district for 27 years.

House of Representatives of the Philippines
Preceded by Dominador Nazareno	Member of the House of Representatives from Cavite's 1st district 1995–2004	Succeeded by Joseph Emilio Abaya
