= Elpidio Barzaga Jr. =

Filipino lawyer and politician (1950–2024)

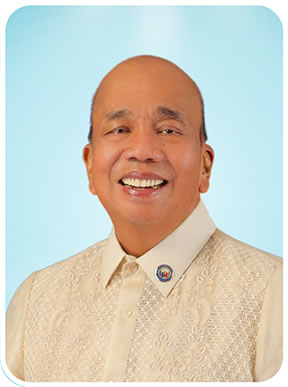
- Official portrait, 2022

Member of the Philippine House of Representatives from Cavite
- In office June 30, 2019 – April 27, 2024
- Preceded by: Jennifer Barzaga
- Succeeded by: Kiko Barzaga
- Constituency: 4th District
- In office June 30, 2010 – June 30, 2016
- Preceded by: District established
- Succeeded by: Jennifer Barzaga
- Constituency: Dasmariñas's at-large
- In office June 30, 2007 – June 30, 2010
- Preceded by: Gilbert Remulla
- Succeeded by: Lani Mercado
- Constituency: 2nd District

Mayor of Dasmariñas
- In office June 30, 2016 – June 30, 2019
- Vice Mayor: Rex Mangubat
- Preceded by: Jennifer Barzaga
- Succeeded by: Jennifer Barzaga
- In office June 30, 1998 – June 30, 2007
- Vice Mayor: Luciano Cantimbuhan (1998–2004); Victor Carungcong (2004–2007)
- Preceded by: Recto Cantimbuhan
- Succeeded by: Jennifer Barzaga
- Officer-in-charge
- In office May 17, 1986 – March 27, 1987
- Preceded by: Recto Cantimbuhan
- Succeeded by: Mariano Veluz

Personal details
- Born: Elpidio Frani Barzaga Jr. March 25, 1950 Dasmariñas, Cavite, Philippines
- Died: April 27, 2024 (aged 74) Palo Alto, California, U.S.
- Resting place: Sacred Heart Memorial Gardens, Dasmariñas
- Party: NUP (2011–2024)
- Other political affiliations: See list: Independent (before 2001); Lakas (I) (2001–2004); PMP (2004–2007); KAMPI (2007–2008); Lakas (2008–2011); Magdalo (2015–2016)
- Spouse: Jennifer Austria (m. 1998)
- Children: 3, including Kiko and Third
- Education: San Beda College (BS); Far Eastern University (LL.B)
- Occupation: Politician
- Profession: Lawyer

Elpidio "Pidi" Frani Barzaga Jr. (March 25, 1950 – April 27, 2024) was a Filipino lawyer and politician. He was the representative of Cavite's 4th district in the House of Representatives of the Philippines from 2010 to 2016 and from 2019 until his death in 2024. This district exclusively covers the city of Dasmariñas and was carved out from the 2nd district, which he represented from 2007 to 2010. In addition to his legislative roles, he served as the mayor of Dasmariñas (1998–2007, 2016–2019).

== Early life and education ==
Barzaga was born on March 25, 1950, in Dasmariñas, Cavite to Elpidio Mangubat Barzaga Sr. and Magdalena Gelle Frani. He graduated valedictorian from the Dasmariñas Elementary School in 1962 and from the Immaculate Conception Academy in 1966, achieving top honors in both his elementary and secondary education. He graduated Bachelor of Science in Commerce Major in Accounting degree cum laude from the San Beda College in 1970. He completed his Bachelor of Laws degree from the Far Eastern University magna cum laude in 1975.

== Legal career ==
After college, he taught law at the Far Eastern University Institute of Law from 1976 to 1992. He was also a Bar Reviewer in Civil Law from 1983 to 1992.

== Political career ==
=== Earlier attempts and as OIC (1986) ===
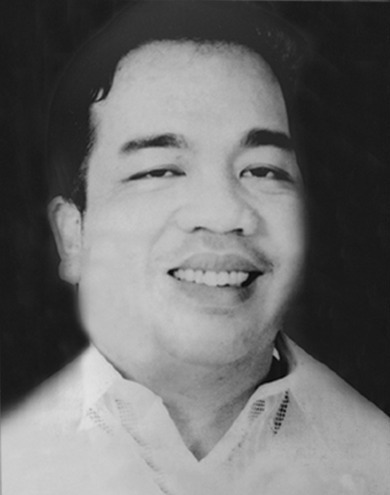
Portrait of Barzaga as municipal mayor

Barzaga had his first attempt in politics in 1980 when he ran for municipal mayor of Dasmariñas challenging Mayor Narcisso Guevarra and lost. In 1986, following the EDSA Revolution, he was appointed as officer-in-charge mayor of Dasmariñas.

He ran for representative of the Second District of Cavite in 1987, for provincial vice governor in 1988, and for municipal mayor, again, in 1992. However, he failed in all of these.

=== As mayor of Dasmariñas ===
Barzaga was eventually elected municipal mayor in 1998 and served for three consecutive terms until 2007. He was succeeded by his wife Jennifer.

In 2016, the couple, both had served for three terms with Barzaga on his last term as district representative, switched political posts, both running under the National Unity Party. He replaced his wife, that time as city mayor. He served until they replaced each other again in 2019.

=== Congressman ===
In 2007, Barzaga, under Kampi which was then part of the ruling coalition (to be known later as Lakas–Kampi–CMD), was elected representative of the Second District of Cavite, defeating incumbent Gilbert Remulla.

In the House of Representatives, Barzaga served as vice chairman of the Committee on Constitutional Amendments, Local Government, and Revision of Laws and was a member of the Committees on Appropriations, Civil Service and Professional Regulation, Good Government, Human Rights, Justice, Population and Family Relations, Public Works and Highways, Science and Technology, Suffrage and Electoral Reforms, Transportation, Veteran Affairs and Welfare and the Special Committee on Southern Tagalog Development.

Barzaga figured prominently on issues concerning Meralco, Sulpicio Lines, the Impeachment Complaint, and Alabang Boys. He authored and sponsored several bills including an act converting Dasmariñas into a component city, a resolution requesting an investigation into oil prices, a resolution requesting an investigation into bidding on updating the Subic Bay Freeport Zone master development plan, and a resolution requesting an investigation of environmental issues during the construction of a casino in Subic Bay Freeport Zone.

Barzaga, along with fellow provincial representatives Jun Abaya and Jesus Crispin Remulla, authored House Bill 4254, which aimed for the congressional reapportionment of Cavite. Approved into law in 2009, this increased the legislative districts of the province from three to seven.

In 2010, Barzaga ran for re-election, this time the Fourth District, which covers Dasmariñas, which had become a city. He won a landslide victory, making him the first representative of the new district. In 2011, Barzaga bolted from Lakas–Kampi–CMD to join the newly formed National Unity Party, where he was named the party's vice president for external affairs, and later the party's chairperson.

In the 2012 impeachment trial of Chief Justice Renato Corona, Barzaga became part of the ten-member prosecution panel, handling Article II which focused on Corona's alleged failure to disclose his statement of assets, liabilities, and net worth. At a time, he engaged his former professor on remedial law at the Far Eastern University, retired Supreme Court Associate Justice Serafin Cuevas, who was the lead defense counsel, in an argument.

In 2013 elections, he successfully sought reelection for his last term under the National Unity Party, which belonged to the coalition led by the Liberal Party (LP) which also had endorsed him.

In 2015, he was criticized by the National Union of Journalists of the Philippines for threatening to cite journalist Christine F. Herrera of The Standard in contempt, after the latter refused to disclose her sources regarding the alleged bribes provided to lawmakers to expedite the passage of the Bangsamoro Basic Law. Barzaga was one of the solons who voted "Yes" for the passage of bill at the committee level.

In 2016, the Barzagas were among those political families which supported the candidacy of Mar Roxas of the Liberal Party in 2016. Barzaga predicted that Grace Poe would not run as the running mate of Roxas, and instead will run under the Nationalist Peoples Coalition, with the idea of a Roxas-Aquino tandem to challenge the Poe-Escudero tandem. Barzaga declined to run for Governor against Remulla, and instead ran for mayor of Dasmariñas.

Barzaga returned to the Congress, particularly in his legislative seat, after being elected in 2019; he was re-elected in 2022. On August 6, 2019, he was named national president of the National Unity Party.

In 2020, Barzaga was prominently featured in the hearings for the renewal of ABS-CBN's congressional franchise when he cited Wikipedia as his source of information. He was one of the 70 representatives who voted to deny the franchise renewal, in favor of the report from Technical Working Group.

Barzaga, with his wife, endorsed Vice President Leni Robredo's presidential bid after opposing his political party's decision to back the presidential bid of Bongbong Marcos, who was endorsed likewise by his son and incumbent city councilor, Kiko. Robredo would later lose to Marcos.

During his tenure as district representative, Barzaga was the chairperson of the House committees on suffrage and electoral reforms (15th Congress), on games and amusement (16th) and on natural resources (18th and 19th).

== Awards and honors ==
In 2008, he was the recipient of the Outstanding Alumnus Award from the Far Eastern University on the celebration of its 80th Founding Anniversary and the Most Distinguished Bedan Award from the San Beda College. He was acknowledged as one of the Most Outstanding Congressmen of 2008 by the Congress Magazine.

== Personal life ==
Barzaga was married to Jennifer Austria, a registered nurse 25 years his junior. They had three sons: Francisco ("Kiko"), Elpidio III ("Third"), and Lorenzo ("Enzo").

Jennifer has been serving as Dasmariñas mayor from 2007 to 2016 and since 2019; while sons Kiko is the former representative of Cavite's 4th district from 2025 to 2026 and Elpidio III is the Dasmariñas mayor since 2026.

== Illness and death ==
In early 2000, he underwent quintuple heart bypass operation. He later revealed having diabetes and asthma. In October 2023, Barzaga announced that he was going to the United States for a major heart operation. He died at Stanford University Medical Center in Palo Alto, California on April 27, 2024, at the age of 74. Three days later, House Speaker Martin Romualdez was designated as the caretaker of Cavite's 4th district. He also added that there will be no special election for the vacated seat due to the 2025 elections being nearly a year away.

Barzaga's remains were flown back to the Philippines for a funeral at the City of Dasmariñas Arena from May 12 to 18, 2024. A requiem Mass was held on May 18 at the Immaculate Conception Parish Church before his burial at the Sacred Heart Memorial Gardens in Dasmariñas later that afternoon. Barzaga was succeeded by his son, Kiko, who was elected in 2025.

== See also ==
- National Telecommunications Commission (Philippines)
- ABS-CBN franchise renewal controversy

Political offices
Preceded by Recto Cantimbuhan	Mayor of Dasmariñas, Cavite; Officer-in-charge; 1986–1987	Succeeded by Mariano Veluz
Preceded by Recto Cantimbuhan	Mayor of Dasmariñas, Cavite; 1998–2007	Succeeded by Jennifer Barzaga
Preceded by Jennifer Barzaga	Mayor of Dasmariñas, Cavite; 2016–2019	Succeeded by Jennifer Barzaga
House of Representatives of the Philippines
Preceded by Gilbert Remulla	Member of the House of Representatives from the Cavite's 2nd congressional district 2007-2010	Succeeded by Lani Mercado-Revilla
New district	Member of the House of Representatives from Dasmariñas's lone district 2010–2016	Succeeded by Jennifer Barzaga
Preceded by Jennifer Barzaga	Member of the House of Representatives from Cavite's 4th congressional district 2019–2024	Succeeded by Kiko Barzaga
