= Cavite's 4th congressional district =

Legislative district of the Philippines

- Constituency for the House of Representatives of the Philippines
- Boundary of Cavite's 4th congressional district in Cavite
- Location of Cavite within the Philippines
- Province: Cavite
- Region: Calabarzon
- Population: 744,511 (2024)
- Electorate: 432,844 (2025)
- Major settlements: Dasmariñas
- Area: 90.13 km^{2} (34.80 sq mi)

Current constituency
- Created: 2009
- Representative: Jenny Barzaga
- Political party: NUP

Cavite's 4th congressional district is one of the eight congressional districts of the Philippines in the province of Cavite. It has been represented in the House of Representatives of the Philippines since 2010. It is currently represented in the 20th Congress by Jenny Barzaga of the National Unity Party.

The district was officially referred to as Dasmariñas's at-large congressional district from its creation in 2009 until 2019.

== Recent election results from province-wide races ==
Year	Office	Results
2022	President	Bongbong Marcos (PFP) 61.89%
2022	Vice President	Sara Duterte (Lakas) 59.97%
2022	Governor	Jonvic Remulla (NUP) 86.69%
2025	Governor	Abeng Remulla (NUP) 70.99%

== List of members representing the district ==
=== House of Representatives (1987–present) ===
No.	Portrait	Member (Lifespan)	Term of office	Party	Legislature	Electoral history	Constituency
District created July 27, 2009 as Dasmariñas's at-large district.
1		Elpidio Barzaga Jr. (1950–2024)	June 30, 2010 – June 30, 2016	Lakas (until 2011)	15th Congress	Redistricted from Cavite's 2nd district and re-elected in 2010.	2010–2019; Dasmariñas
1		Elpidio Barzaga Jr. (1950–2024)	June 30, 2010 – June 30, 2016	NUP (from 2011)	15th Congress	Redistricted from Cavite's 2nd district and re-elected in 2010.	2010–2019; Dasmariñas
1		Elpidio Barzaga Jr. (1950–2024)	June 30, 2010 – June 30, 2016	NUP (Magdalo)	16th Congress	Re-elected in 2013.	2010–2019; Dasmariñas
2		Jenny Barzaga (born 1975)	June 30, 2016 – June 30, 2019	NUP	17th Congress	Elected in 2016.	2010–2019; Dasmariñas
District designated September 14, 2018 as Cavite's 4th district.
(1)		Elpidio Barzaga Jr. (1950–2024)	June 30, 2019 – April 27, 2024	NUP	18th Congress	Elected in 2019.	2019–present Dasmariñas
(1)		Elpidio Barzaga Jr. (1950–2024)	June 30, 2019 – April 27, 2024	NUP	19th Congress	Re-elected in 2022. Died in office.	2019–present Dasmariñas
Vacant (April 27, 2024 – June 30, 2025)					19th Congress	No special election held to fill vacancy.	2019–present Dasmariñas
3		Kiko Barzaga (born 1998)	June 30, 2025 – June 2, 2026	NUP (until 2025)	20th Congress	Elected in 2025. Expelled.	2019–present Dasmariñas
3		Kiko Barzaga (born 1998)	June 30, 2025 – June 2, 2026	Independent (2025–2026)	20th Congress	Elected in 2025. Expelled.	2019–present Dasmariñas
3		Kiko Barzaga (born 1998)	June 30, 2025 – June 2, 2026	PDP (from 2026)	20th Congress	Elected in 2025. Expelled.	2019–present Dasmariñas
Vacant (June 2 – August 31, 2026)					20th Congress	—	2019–present Dasmariñas
(2)		Jenny Barzaga (born 1975)	September 1, 2026 – present	NUP	20th Congress	Elected in 2026 to finish her son's term.	2019–present Dasmariñas

== Election results ==
=== 2010 ===
2010 Philippine House of Representatives elections in Dasmariñas
Party	Candidate	Votes	%
Lakas–Kampi	Elpidio Barzaga Jr.	163,766	91.68
Independent	Fernando Campos	7,551	4.23
Nacionalista	Ramon Campos	6,158	3.45
Independent	Editha Doroteo	1,162	0.65
Valid ballots		178,637	94.40
Invalid or blank votes		10,606	5.60
Total votes		189,243	100.00
Lakas–Kampi win (new seat)			

=== 2013 ===
2013 Philippine House of Representatives elections in Dasmariñas
Party	Candidate	Votes	%
NUP	Elpidio Barzaga Jr.	121,908	87.70
Lakas–Kampi	Miguel Ilano	17,091	12.30
Total votes		138,999	100.00
NUP hold			

=== 2016 ===
2016 Philippine House of Representatives elections in Dasmariñas
Party	Candidate	Votes	%
NUP	Jenny Barzaga	227,022	95.35
UNA	Alen Manzano	11,064	4.65
Total votes		238,086	100.00
NUP hold			

=== 2019 ===
2019 Philippine House of Representatives elections in Cavite
Party	Candidate	Votes	%
NUP	Elpidio Barzaga Jr.	198,130	77.27
PFP	Benhardi Mantele	51,250	19.99
PDDS	Aileen Padel	3,828	1.49
PDP–Laban	Leonardo Manici Jr.	3,210	1.25
Total votes		256,418	100.00
NUP hold			

=== 2022 ===
2022 Philippine House of Representatives elections in Cavite
Party	Candidate	Votes	%
NUP	Elpidio Barzaga Jr.	278,386	89.86
Independent	Osmundo Calupad	31,421	10.14
Total votes		309,807	100.00
NUP hold			

=== 2025 ===
2025 Philippine House of Representatives elections in Cavite
Party	Candidate	Votes	%
NUP	Kiko Barzaga	165,942	50.37
Independent	Jesse Frani	150,316	45.63
Independent	Osmundo Calupad	9,583	2.91
PLM	Leysander Ordenes	3,591	1.09
Total votes		329,432	100.00
NUP hold			

=== 2026 special ===
2026 Philippine House of Representatives special election in Cavite's 4th district
Party	Candidate	Votes	%
NUP	Jenny Barzaga	201,893	78.14
Independent	Rex Mangubat	30,373	11.76
PFP	Jesse Frani	24,350	9.42
Independent	Marvin Dupal-ag	1,184	0.46
Independent	Leysander Ordenes	561	0.22
Total votes		258,371	100.00
NUP gain from PDP			

== See also ==
- Legislative districts of Cavite
- Legislative district of Dasmariñas
