= Cavite's 1st congressional district =

Legislative district of the Philippines

- Constituency for the House of Representatives of the Philippines
- Interactive map of district boundaries
- Location of Cavite within the Philippines

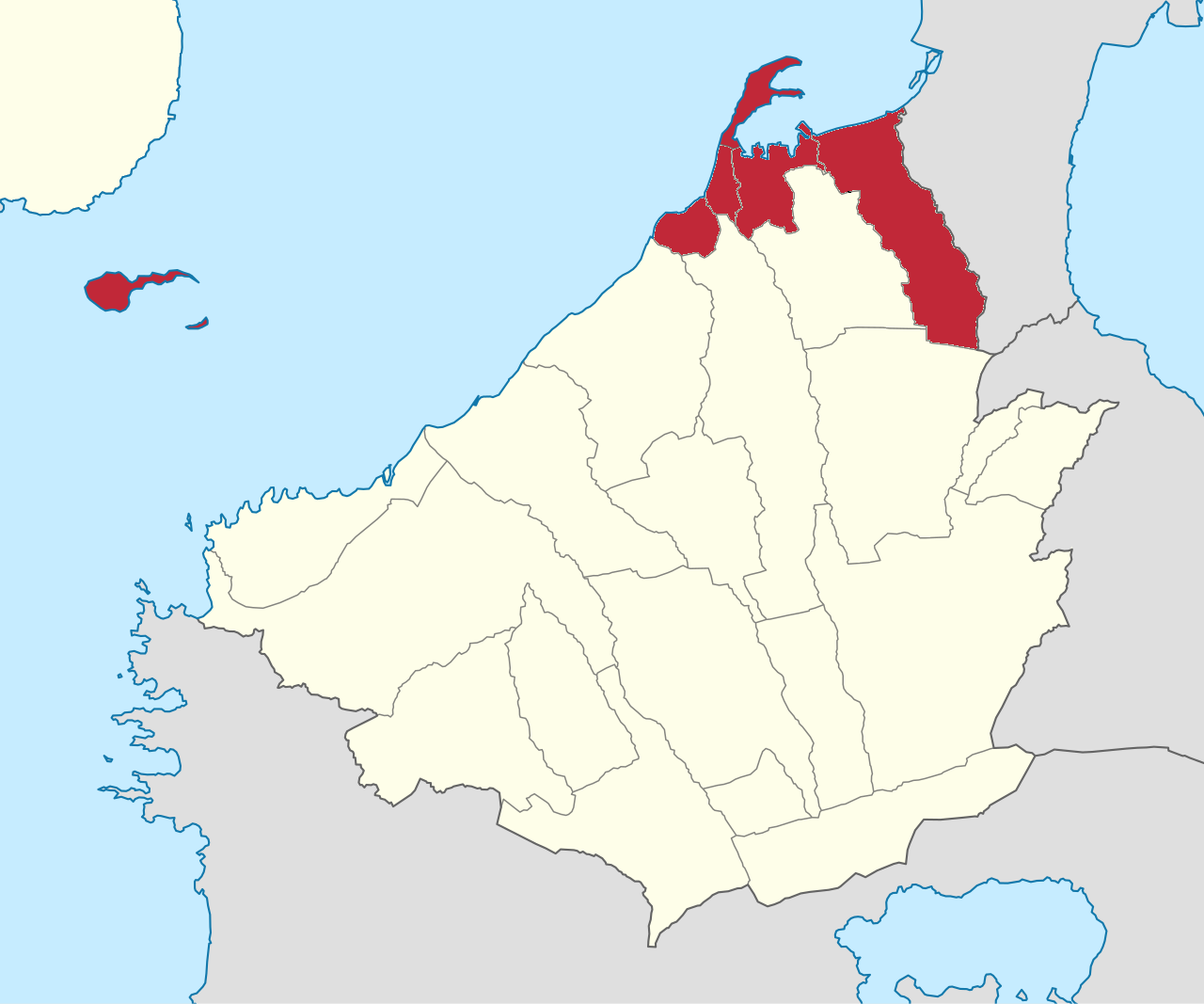
- District boundaries, 1987-2010
- Province: Cavite
- Region: Calabarzon
- Population: 368,468 (2020)
- Electorate: 260,439 (2022)
- Major settlements: 4 LGUs: City; Cavite City; Municipalities; Kawit; Noveleta; Rosario
- Area: 88.34 km^{2} (34.11 sq mi)

Current constituency
- Created: 1987
- Representative: Jolo Revilla
- Political party: NUP; Magdalo
- Congressional bloc: Majority

Cavite's 1st congressional district is one of the eight congressional districts of the Philippines in the province of Cavite. It has been represented in the House of Representatives of the Philippines since 1987. The district consists of the city of Cavite and its adjacent municipalities of Kawit, Noveleta, and Rosario. It is currently represented in the 20th Congress by Jolo Revilla of the National Unity Party and Partido Magdalo.

The district previously included the city of Bacoor until 2010.

== Representation history ==
#	Image	Member	Term of office		Congress	Party	Electoral history	Constituent LGUs
#	Image	Member	Start	End	Congress	Party	Electoral history	Constituent LGUs
=== Cavite's 1st district for the House of Representatives of the Philippines ===
District created February 2, 1987.
1		Leonardo L. Guerrero	June 30, 1987	June 30, 1992	8th	Nacionalista (Magdalo)	Elected in 1987.	1987–2010; Bacoor, Cavite City, Kawit, Noveleta, Rosario
2		Dominador G. Nazareno, Jr.	June 30, 1992	June 30, 1995	9th	NPC	Elected in 1992.	1987–2010; Bacoor, Cavite City, Kawit, Noveleta, Rosario
3		Plaridel M. Abaya	June 30, 1995	June 30, 2004	10th	NPC	Elected in 1995.	1987–2010; Bacoor, Cavite City, Kawit, Noveleta, Rosario
3		Plaridel M. Abaya	June 30, 1995	June 30, 2004	11th	NPC	Re-elected in 1998.	1987–2010; Bacoor, Cavite City, Kawit, Noveleta, Rosario
3		Plaridel M. Abaya	June 30, 1995	June 30, 2004	12th	NPC	Re-elected in 2001.	1987–2010; Bacoor, Cavite City, Kawit, Noveleta, Rosario
4		Joseph Emilio A. Abaya	June 30, 2004	October 18, 2012	13th	Liberal	Elected in 2004.	1987–2010; Bacoor, Cavite City, Kawit, Noveleta, Rosario
4		Joseph Emilio A. Abaya	June 30, 2004	October 18, 2012	14th	Liberal	Re-elected in 2007.	1987–2010; Bacoor, Cavite City, Kawit, Noveleta, Rosario
4		Joseph Emilio A. Abaya	June 30, 2004	October 18, 2012	15th	Liberal	Re-elected in 2010. Resigned on appointment as Secretary of Transportation and Communications.	2010–present Cavite City, Kawit, Noveleta, Rosario
-	vacant		October 18, 2012	June 30, 2013	15th	No special election to fill vacancy.		2010–present Cavite City, Kawit, Noveleta, Rosario
5		Francis Gerald A. Abaya	June 30, 2013	June 30, 2022	16th	Liberal (Magdalo)	Elected in 2013.	2010–present Cavite City, Kawit, Noveleta, Rosario
5		Francis Gerald A. Abaya	June 30, 2013	June 30, 2022	17th	Liberal (Magdalo)	Re-elected in 2016.	2010–present Cavite City, Kawit, Noveleta, Rosario
5		Francis Gerald A. Abaya	June 30, 2013	June 30, 2022	18th	Liberal (Magdalo)	Re-elected in 2019.	2010–present Cavite City, Kawit, Noveleta, Rosario
6		Ramon Jolo B. Revilla III	June 30, 2022	Incumbent	19th	Lakas (Magdalo)	Elected in 2022.	2010–present Cavite City, Kawit, Noveleta, Rosario
6		Ramon Jolo B. Revilla III	June 30, 2022	Incumbent	20th	NUP (Magdalo)	Re-elected in 2025.	2010–present Cavite City, Kawit, Noveleta, Rosario

== Election results ==
=== 2025 ===
2025 Philippine House of Representatives election in Cavite's 1st congressional district
Party	Candidate	Votes	%
Lakas	Jolo Revilla	147,263	77.93
Liberal	Paul Abaya	41,710	22.07
Total votes		188,973	100
Lakas hold			

=== 2022 ===
2022 Philippine House of Representatives elections
Party	Candidate	Votes	%
Lakas	Jolo Revilla	101,809	52.33
Liberal	Paul Abaya	92,761	47.67
Total votes		194,570	100%
Lakas gain from Liberal			

=== 2019 ===
2019 Philippine House of Representatives elections
Party	Candidate	Votes	%
Liberal	Francis Gerald Abaya	117,031	89.28%
PMP	Jose Luis Granados	14,053	10.72%
Total votes		131,084	100%
Liberal hold			

=== 2016 ===
2016 Philippine House of Representatives elections
Party	Candidate	Votes	%
Liberal	Francis Gerald Abaya	114,700	86.5%
NPC	Marina Rieta Granados	17,605	13.5%
Total votes		132,305	100%
Liberal hold			

=== 2013 ===
2013 Philippine House of Representatives elections
Party	Candidate	Votes	%
Liberal	Francis Gerald Abaya	81,724	76.58%
Nacionalista	Federico Poblete	24,994	23.42%
Total votes		106,718	100%
Liberal hold			

=== 2010 ===
2010 Philippine House of Representatives elections
Party	Candidate	Votes	%
Liberal	Joseph Emilio Abaya	75,408	55.37%
Lakas–Kampi	Bernardo Paredes	58,780	43.60%
Independent	Adel Dinero	2,009	1.48%
Invalid or blank votes		7,330	5.11%
Total votes		143,527	100%
Liberal hold			

=== 2007 ===
2007 Philippine House of Representatives elections
Party	Candidate	Votes	%
Liberal	Joseph Emilio Abaya	137,697	64.70%
LDP	Jessie Castillo	74,405	34.96%
Independent	Jose Herminio Japson	474	0.22%
Independent	Gerbie Ber Ado	254	0.12%
Total votes		212,830	100%
Liberal hold			

== See also ==
- Legislative districts of Cavite
