= Cavite's 2nd congressional district =

Legislative district of the Philippines

- Constituency for the House of Representatives of the Philippines
- Interactive map of district boundaries
- Location of Cavite within the Philippines

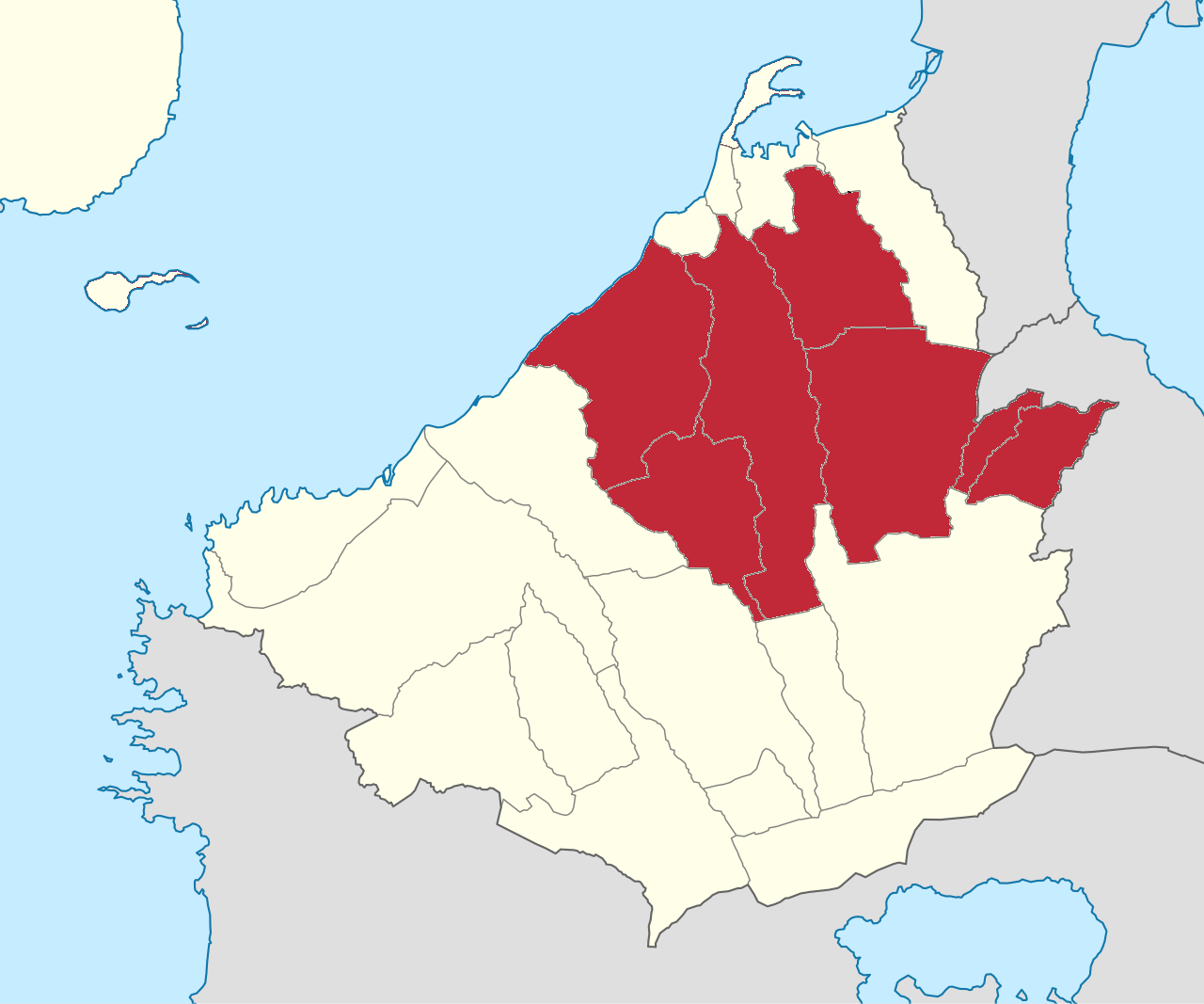
- District boundaries, 1987-2010
- Province: Cavite
- Region: Calabarzon
- Population: 664,625 (2020)
- Electorate: 309,462 (2025)
- Major settlements: Bacoor
- Area: 46.17 km^{2} (17.83 sq mi)

Current constituency
- Created: 1987
- Representative: Lani Mercado
- Political party: Lakas–CMD; Magdalo
- Congressional bloc: Majority

Cavite's 2nd congressional district is one of the eight congressional districts of the Philippines in the province of Cavite. It has been represented in the House of Representatives of the Philippines since 1987. The district consists of the northeastern city of Bacoor. It is currently represented in the 20th Congress by Lani Mercado of Lakas–CMD and Partido Magdalo.

The second district previously encompassed the cities of Dasmariñas and Trece Martires, the de facto provincial capital, along with the adjacent central Cavite municipalities of Carmona, General Mariano Alvarez, General Trias, Imus, and Tanza until the reapportionment took effect in 2010.

== Representation history ==
#	Image	Member	Term of office		Congress	Party	Electoral history	Constituent LGUs
#	Image	Member	Start	End	Congress	Party	Electoral history	Constituent LGUs
=== Cavite's 2nd district for the House of Representatives of the Philippines ===
District created February 2, 1987.
1		Renato P. Dragon	June 30, 1987	June 30, 1998	8th	Nacionalista (Magdalo)	Elected in 1987.	1987–2010; Carmona, Dasmariñas, General Mariano Alvarez, General Trias, Imus, Tanza, Trece Martires
1		Renato P. Dragon	June 30, 1987	June 30, 1998	9th	LDP (Magdalo)	Re-elected in 1992.	1987–2010; Carmona, Dasmariñas, General Mariano Alvarez, General Trias, Imus, Tanza, Trece Martires
1		Renato P. Dragon	June 30, 1987	June 30, 1998	10th	LDP (Magdalo)	Re-elected in 1995.	1987–2010; Carmona, Dasmariñas, General Mariano Alvarez, General Trias, Imus, Tanza, Trece Martires
2		Erineo S. Maliksi	June 30, 1998	June 30, 2001	11th	LDP (LAMMP) (Magdalo)	Elected in 1998.	1987–2010; Carmona, Dasmariñas, General Mariano Alvarez, General Trias, Imus, Tanza, Trece Martires
3		Gilbert C. Remulla	June 30, 2001	June 30, 2007	12th	LDP (Magdalo)	Elected in 2001.	1987–2010; Carmona, Dasmariñas, General Mariano Alvarez, General Trias, Imus, Tanza, Trece Martires
3		Gilbert C. Remulla	June 30, 2001	June 30, 2007	13th	Nacionalista (Magdalo)	Re-elected in 2004.	1987–2010; Carmona, Dasmariñas, General Mariano Alvarez, General Trias, Imus, Tanza, Trece Martires
4		Elpidio F. Barzaga, Jr.	June 30, 2007	June 30, 2010	14th	KAMPI	Elected in 2007. Redistricted to the 4th district.	1987–2010; Carmona, Dasmariñas, General Mariano Alvarez, General Trias, Imus, Tanza, Trece Martires
4		Elpidio F. Barzaga, Jr.	June 30, 2007	June 30, 2010	14th	Lakas	Elected in 2007. Redistricted to the 4th district.	1987–2010; Carmona, Dasmariñas, General Mariano Alvarez, General Trias, Imus, Tanza, Trece Martires
5		Lani Mercado-Revilla	June 30, 2010	June 30, 2016	15th	Lakas (Magdalo)	Elected in 2010.	2010–present Bacoor
5		Lani Mercado-Revilla	June 30, 2010	June 30, 2016	16th	Lakas (Magdalo)	Re-elected in 2013.	2010–present Bacoor
6		Strike B. Revilla	June 30, 2016	June 30, 2022	17th	Lakas (Magdalo)	Elected in 2016.	2010–present Bacoor
6		Strike B. Revilla	June 30, 2016	June 30, 2022	18th	NUP (Magdalo)	Re-elected in 2019.	2010–present Bacoor
6		Strike B. Revilla	June 30, 2016	June 30, 2022	18th	Nacionalista (Magdalo)	Re-elected in 2019.	2010–present Bacoor
(5)		Lani Mercado-Revilla	June 30, 2022	Incumbent	19th	Lakas (Magdalo)	Elected in 2022.	2010–present Bacoor
(5)		Lani Mercado-Revilla	June 30, 2022	Incumbent	20th	Lakas (Magdalo)	Re-elected in 2025.	2010–present Bacoor

== Election results ==
=== 2025 ===
2025 Philippine House of Representatives election in Cavite's 2nd congressional district
Party	Candidate	Votes	%
Lakas	Lani Mercado-Revilla	172,694	100
Total votes		172,694	100
Lakas hold			

=== 2022 ===
2022 Philippine House of Representatives elections
Party	Candidate	Votes	%
Lakas	Lani Mercado-Revilla	168,385	86.05
Independent	Jose Herminio Japson	18,142	9.27
Independent	George Abraham Ber Ado	9,158	4.68
Total votes		195,685	100%
Lakas gain from Nacionalista			

=== 2019 ===
2019 Philippine House of Representatives elections
Party	Candidate	Votes	%
NUP	Strike Revilla	141,465	100%
Total votes		141,465	100%
NUP hold			

=== 2016 ===
2016 Philippine House of Representatives elections
Party	Candidate	Votes	%
Lakas	Strike Revilla	141,468	76.48%
Liberal	Mark Orline Buena	16,228	8.77%
Invalid or blank votes		27,280	14.75%
Total votes		184,976	100%
Lakas hold			

=== 2013 ===
2013 Philippine House of Representatives elections
Party	Candidate	Votes	%
Lakas–Kampi	Lani Mercado-Revilla		
Liberal	Jessie Castillo		
NUP	Gerbie Ber Ado		
Total votes			
Lakas–Kampi hold			

=== 2010 ===
2010 Philippine House of Representatives elections
Party	Candidate	Votes	%
Lakas–Kampi	Lani Mercado-Revilla	89,365	61.64%
Liberal	Plaridel Abaya	55,088	38.00%
Independent	Gerbie Ber Ado	518	0.36%
Invalid or blank votes		5,583	3.71%
Total votes		150,554	100%
Lakas–Kampi win (new seat)			

=== 2007 ===
2007 Philippine House of Representatives elections
Party	Candidate	Votes	%
Lakas	Elpidio Barzaga Jr.	188,009	50.26%
Nacionalista	Gilbert Remulla	184,626	49.36%
Independent	Franklin Cale	1,416	0.38%
Total votes		374,051	100%
Lakas gain from Nacionalista			

== See also ==
- Legislative districts of Cavite
