= Kiko Barzaga =

Filipino politician (born 1998)

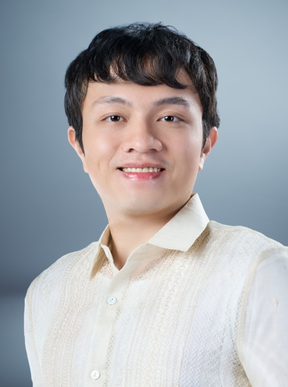
- Official portrait, 2025

Member of the Philippine House of Representatives from Cavite's 4th district
- In office June 30, 2025 – June 2, 2026 (Note: Suspended: December 1, 2025 – January 30, 2026; February 4 – April 4, 2026; Expelled: June 2, 2026)
- Preceded by: Elpidio Barzaga Jr.
- Succeeded by: Jenny Barzaga

House Assistant Majority Leader
- In office July 29, 2025 – September 10, 2025
- Leader: Sandro Marcos

Member of the Cavite Provincial Board
- Ex officio
- In office June 30, 2022 – June 30, 2025
- Sector: Philippine Councilors League
- Preceded by: Anne Jomille Humarang (interim)
- Succeeded by: Edward Samala Jr.

Member of the Dasmariñas City Council
- In office June 30, 2019 – June 30, 2025

Personal details
- Born: Francisco Austria Barzaga; September 12, 1998 (age 28) Dasmariñas, Cavite, Philippines
- Party: PDP (since 2026)
- Other political affiliations: Independent (2025–2026); NUP (2021–2025)
- Relations: Third Barzaga (brother)
- Parents: Elpidio Barzaga Jr. (father); Jenny Barzaga (mother)
- Education: De La Salle University – Dasmariñas (dropped out)
- Occupation: Politician
- Nickname(s): Congressmeow, Cong Meow

TikTok information
- Page: Ex-Congressman Kiko Barzaga
- Years active: 2020–present
- Genre: Political satire
- Followers: 388.6 thousand
- Last updated: October 18, 2026
- Kiko Barzaga's voice Barzaga speaks on the Capture of Nicolás Maduro. Recorded January 6, 2026

Francisco "Kiko" Austria Barzaga (born September 12, 1998) is a Filipino politician, animal welfare advocate, and social media influencer who previously served as the representative for Cavite's 4th district from 2025 until his expulsion from the House of Representatives in 2026. Before that, he was suspended for 60 days from December 1, 2025, for disorderly behavior and misconduct. He briefly returned on January 30, 2026, but was suspended once again on February 4, 2026. During his tenure, he also served as an assistant majority leader from July 2025 until his resignation in September that year. A member of the Barzaga political family based in Dasmariñas, he served as a member of that city's council from 2019 to 2025 and an ex officio member of the Cavite Provincial Board as the President of the Philippine Councilors League from 2022 to 2025. He is the third person in Philippine history to be expelled from Congress after Arnie Teves in 2023 and Dominador Gómez in 1908.

Before his expulsion, Barzaga was the second-youngest member of the 20th Congress after Tingog Party List representative Andrew Julian Romualdez. Since 2026, he is a member of the Partido Demokratiko Pilipino. Barzaga was an independent for almost seven months after resigning from the National Unity Party in 2025.

He is known for his online presence for "shitposting", positioning himself as a critic of the current Marcos administration and an ally of the Duterte's. He aligned the political ideology of Dutertismo. He faced ethics complaints in the House of Representatives for unethical behavior and numerous criminal charges for sedition and rebellion.

== Early life and education ==
Francisco Austria Barzaga was born on September 12, 1998 in Dasmariñas, Cavite, to then municipal mayor Elpidio Barzaga Jr. and then barangay San Simon councilor Jenny Barzaga (née Austria). He was named after his great-grandfather Francisco E. Barzaga, who had served as municipal president of Dasmariñas in 1900 and from 1922 to 1924. He is also the older brother of incumbent Dasmariñas mayor Elpidio "Third" Barzaga III and Lorenzo "Enzo" Barzaga.

Barzaga had delayed his college pursuit as of 2017 due to his political preparations, which led to his election as a Dasmariñas city councilor in 2019. He then enrolled at the De La Salle University – Dasmariñas in 2022 to pursue a degree in political science. However, he dropped out in 2025 during his third year due to the demands of his alderman duties and congressional candidacy. In an interview with Ogie Diaz, he had also stated plans to transfer to Kolehiyo ng Lungsod ng Dasmariñas and to take up a veterinary course.

== Early politcal career ==
=== Dasmariñas City Council (2019–2025) ===
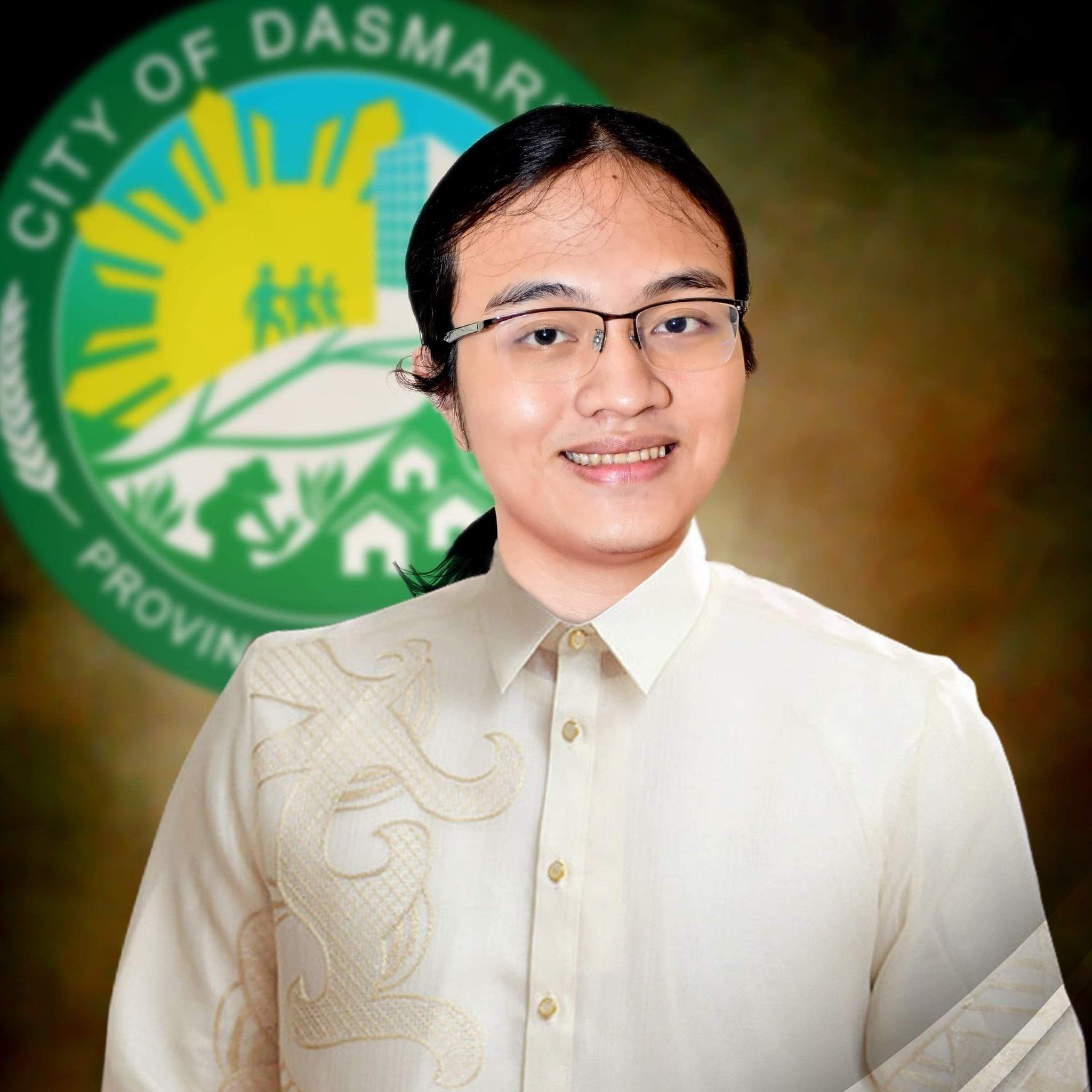
Barzaga's portrait as Dasmariñas City Councilor

Barzaga in 2023

Barzaga ran for a seat in the Dasmariñas City Council during the 2019 elections and 2022 elections and successfully won both of them. In 2022, he endorsed the successful presidential and vice-presidential campaigns of Bongbong Marcos and Sara Duterte, respectively, as well as their UniTeam ticket. Later that year and during his second term as councilor, he was named president of the Philippine Councilors League Cavite Chapter, earning him an ex officio seat on the Cavite Provincial Board.

==== Team Dasma proclamation rally 2022 incident ====
In March 2022, during the 2022 Philippine elections, Barzaga's father, Elpidio Barzaga Jr., the party president of the NUP, endorsed Leni Robredo's presidential campaign. The younger Barzaga then went on stage, played his campaign jingle, and interrupted his father. He then grabbed his father's papers and asked, "Why is this Leni?" and publicly endorsed and reminded everyone to vote for Bongbong Marcos, chanted "BBM!, BBM!", and reminded the rally attenders to vote for Barzaga. He was the only candidate wearing red during the rally.

== House of Representatives (2025–2026) ==
=== 2025 election ===
Barzaga ran for House representative of Cavite's fourth district, aiming to replace his late father, Elpidio Barzaga Jr., who died in office on April 27, 2024. He, along with his mother and brother, won the election. In a post-election interview by News5, Barzaga stated he has no plans to run for national level positions.

==== 2025 campaign jingle and style ====
Barzaga's 2025 campaign jingle for congressman was a cover of Haring Manggi Miguelito Malakas's song "Lupaypay" and even sang by Haring Manggi himself. The jingle went viral due to its catchy tunes and the fact that Barzaga's campaign was very associated with cats. Labor leader and senatorial candidate Luke Espiritu criticized Barzaga, saying he won not because of his campaign style but because he is part of a political family.

=== 20th Congress (2025–2026) ===
==== Tenure ====
Barzaga supported House Speaker Martin Romualdez's successful reelection and became a member of the majority bloc during the commencement of the 20th Congress on July 28, 2025. The next day, Barzaga was named as an assistant majority leader under House Majority Leader Sandro Marcos (President Bongbong Marcos' son and Speaker Romualdez's first cousin once removed).

There is growing disappointment with the Marcos administration, stemming from its perceived poor performance and allegations of involvement in the flood control projects scandal. Barzaga emerged as a whistleblower, calling attention to these issues and expressing frustration with an administration he once believed would carry forward the promise of Philippine progress after the Duterte era. He has since called for President Marcos to step down.

On September 10, 2025, Barzaga left the National Unity Party (NUP) after he was supposedly accused by Deputy Speaker and party chairman Ronaldo Puno that he solicited signatures to remove Speaker Romualdez, a claim which Barzaga denied. He also left the majority bloc and gave up being an assistant majority leader. He also called for an investigation into alleged irregularities in flood control funding while Speaker Romualdez was the legislative caretaker of Cavite's 4th District following the death of Barzaga's father Elpidio Jr. in April 2024, claiming anomalies may have occurred during Romauldez's oversight. In addition, he had also publicly criticized President Marcos and his son Sandro, Senate President Tito Sotto, and Senator Ping Lacson on Facebook regarding such investigation.

On September 15, 2025, the NUP announced its intent to file an ethics complaint against Barzaga, citing four possible violations: failing to reflect creditably on the House, engaging in unlawful and immoral acts, inciting seditious activity, and conduct unbecoming of a member of Congress. Evidence presented in the ethics complaint include Barzaga posting lewd photos with scantily clad women and him making ostentatious display of wealth by holding bundles of cash.

On September 16, 2025, Barzaga expressed his intent to replace Martin Romualdez as Speaker and hoped Sandro Marcos will support him. Barzaga said he had one or two House members that are willing to support him for speakership. However, following Romualdez's resignation as Speaker on September 17, Barzaga was not nominated for the speakership and chose to abstain from the election, which resulted in Bojie Dy being elected as the new Speaker. On September 23, Barzaga filed an ethics complaint against Ronaldo Puno accusing him of misconduct It also partly stemmed from Puno's remarks regarding mental health, which for Barzaga "is a very sensitive topic, and it's also one that one cannot speak on without necessary professional ability." On September 24, Barzaga admitted plotting a coup d'état against Speaker Dy and publicly endorsed Navotas Representative Toby Tiangco as Speaker.

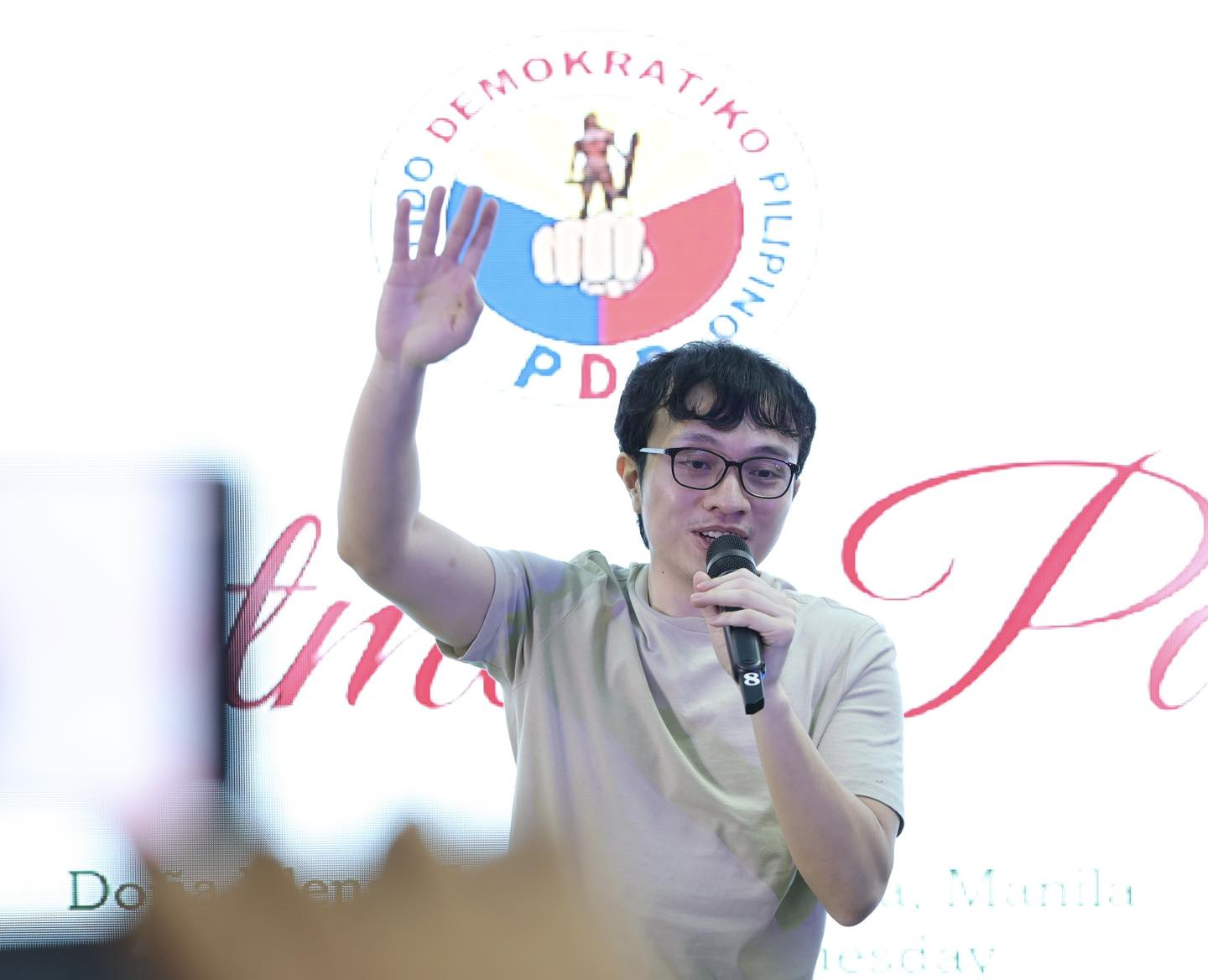
Barzaga speaking at a PDP–Laban Christmas Party

Deputy Speaker Janette Garin alleged that Barzaga invited her to be part of an independent "meow" bloc in the House of Representatives. A few days prior, she voiced concern over his "meow-meow" interjections during sessions and his unannounced speakership bid, noting his behavior was causing confusion and was inappropriate for the House's decorum.

On October 8, 2025, Barzaga filed an impeachment complaint against President Marcos for betrayal of public trust over the involvement of anomalies and corruption in flood control. However, Speaker Bojie Dy said that this will likely not pass. On October 12, 2025, Barzaga attended anti-Marcos and anti-corruption protests at Plaza Rajah Sulayman in Manila and outside Dasmariñas and Forbes Park villages in Makati, which he had called for in which houses of Speaker Romualdez and of former Ako Bicol party-list representative Zaldy Co are located.

In November 2025, the Criminal Investigation and Detection Group filed complaints of Inciting to Sedition and Inciting to Rebellion against Barzaga with the Quezon City Office of the Prosecutor. The charges stem from the violent incidents during the September 21 rallies in Manila.

On January 2, 2026, Barzaga urged the investigation of the death of Dueñas, Iloilo vice mayor Aimee Paz Lamasan and claimed her death was linked with the flood control scandal. On January 22, 2026, Barzaga filed counter-affidavits on two criminal cases.

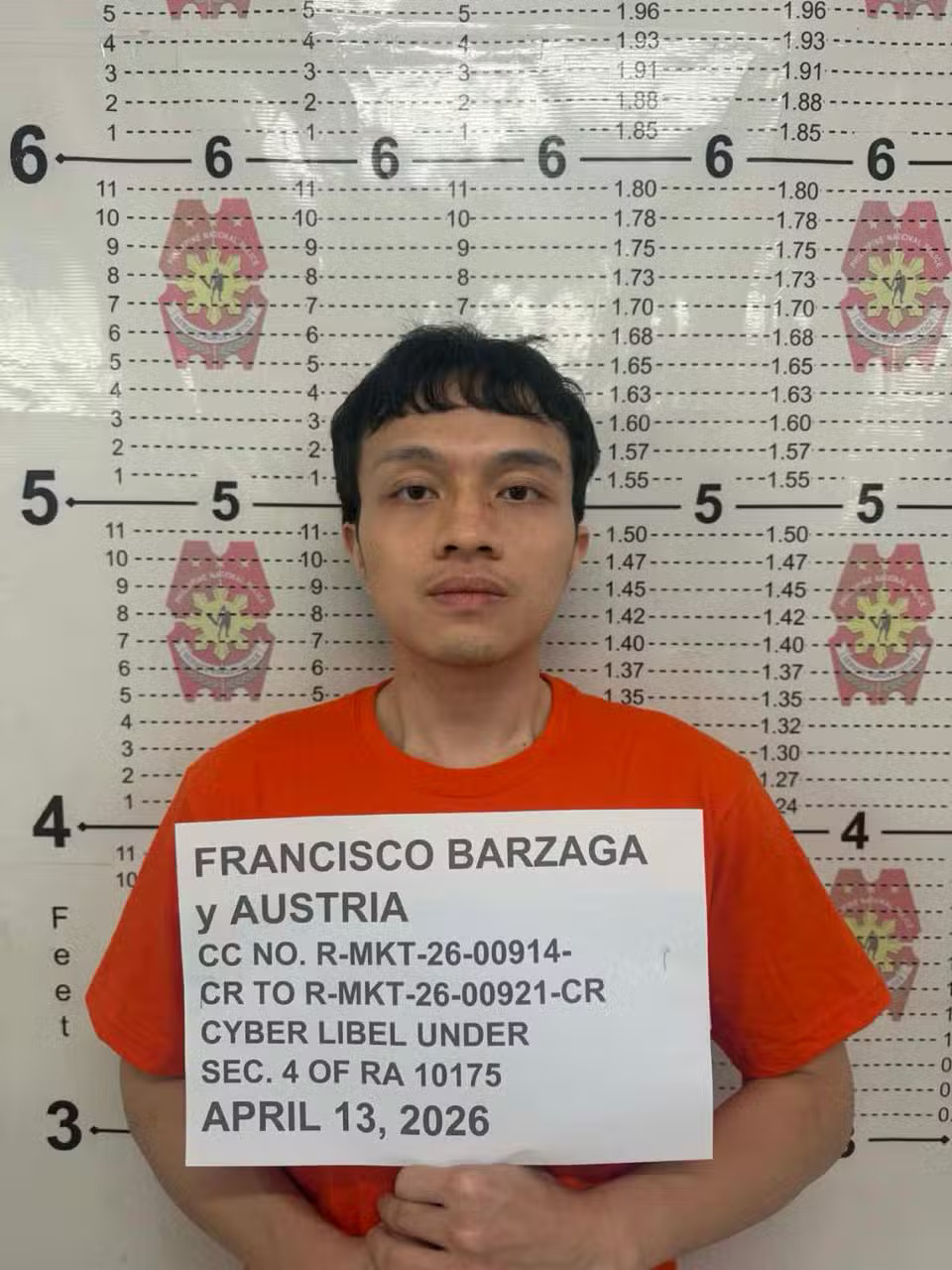
Mug shot of Barzaga after he surrendered to the Dasmariñas City Police Station on April 13, 2026.

On April 13, 2026, Barzaga surrendered himself to the Dasmariñas City Police Station over the cyberlibel case against him. He was later released after posting a bail of ₱384,000 before the Makati City Regional Trial Court Branch 147 on April 14, 2026. After he was released, Barzaga made his mugshot his profile picture on Facebook. Barzaga then called for the ouster of President Marcos claiming that he was the one who called for Barzaga's short-lived imprisonment. When Barzaga was asked if he would join the Partido Demokratiko Pilipino (PDP), the party of detained former president Rodrigo Duterte and his base, he did not answer directly but replied with "Meowmaybe mwehehehe".

On April 28, 2026, Garin warned Barzaga that he may face expulsion from the house due to him not behaving properly and doing his duties as a lawmaker. Garin said that when there is a serious discussion, he suddenly creates a commotion, doing random live streaming, and poking others with his cellphone. Garin herself filed an ethics complaint against Barzaga due to him allegedly blaming her, her daughter, and representative Lorenz Defensor for the death of Aimee Paz Lamasan. In a conversation that Garin had with Barzaga on why he acts like this and is always rage-baiting people and his fellow representatives, Barzaga allegedly replied by calling her "mommy" and saying that cats like to quarrel and that if he doesn't keep quarreling with other people then he is not a cat.

Barzaga added that a "cat will have many enemies" and Garin responded that she is not a cat and is a duly elected member of Congress. Garin then said that it would be better for Barzaga to be expelled since it would give more chances of him being in the headline adding that they had to remind Barzaga that Congress is a serious job. The next day on April 29, 2026, in a social media post Barzaga denied that he called Garin "mommy" and calls her by her "official title" which is "dengvaxia queen". On the same day, Barzaga officially joined the PDP and became a member and took his oath at its headquarters in Santa Mesa, Manila. On May 11, 2026, Barzaga voted not in favor in the house plenary vote of the second impeachment of Sara Duterte and was of the only twenty five representatives to against the impeachment.

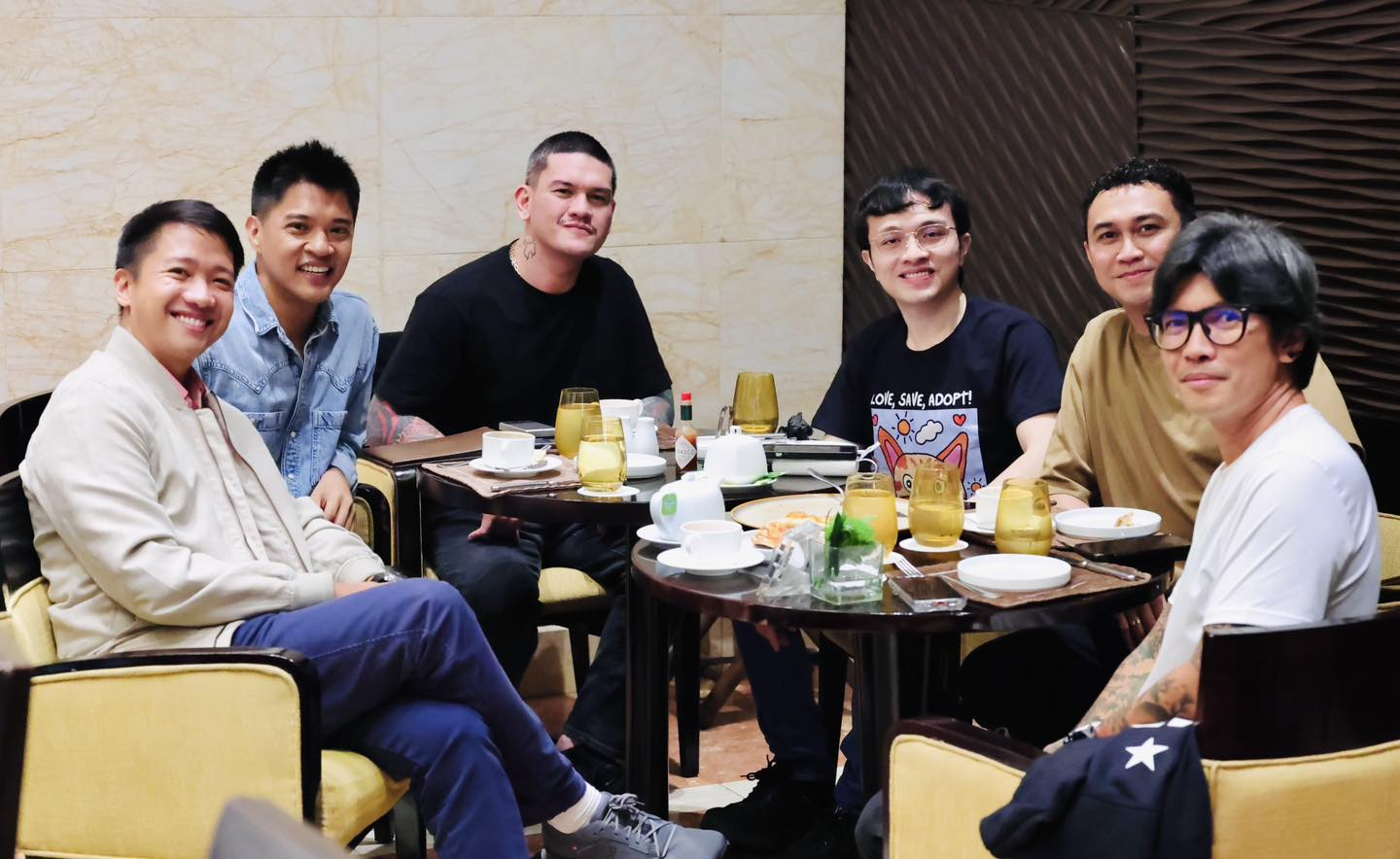
Barzaga (third from right) meeting with Davao City Mayor Sebastian Duterte (third from left) at Fairmont Makati on January 30, 2026

=== Social media activities, suspension, and expulsion ===
Barzaga's social media posts on Facebook his posts included about setting the Batasang Pambansa on fire, bringing airsoft guns to a protest, criticizing the Department of Justice, Department of Public Works and Highways, Jonvic Remulla, Martin Romualdez, Bongbong Marcos, displaying wealth, lewd content, and degrading views on women.

On October 13, 2025, Barzaga missed his own House ethics hearing which was held hours after he had attended a late-night rally in Makati. He cited playing computer games that night as the reason for his absence.

On December 1, 2025, Barzaga was suspended for 60 days due to reckless behavior from his posts on social media. The adoption of the ethics committee recommendation against Barzaga was voted in favor by 249 House members, 5 voted against, and 11 abstained. In late December 2025, after the death of representative Romeo Acop, Barzaga posted statements against him and claimed "he is in hell" and proceeded to mock Acop's death and post memes about it.

On January 14, 2026, billionaire Enrique K. Razon filed cyberlibel complaints against Barzaga after the latter alleged on social media that Razon had bribed NUP members. Barzaga later apologized to Razon for "confidential" personal issues, although the legal complaint continued. On January 20, 2026, Ronaldo Puno filed cyberlibel complaints against Barzaga, followed by a similar complaint by congressman Rolan Valeriano the next day.

On February 4, 2026, Barzaga was suspended for another 60 days. The adoption of the ethics committee recommendation against Barzaga was voted in favor by 238 House members, 10 voted against, and 9 abstained. Barzaga returned to the House of Representatives on April 5, 2026.

On June 2, 2026, Barzaga was expelled as the representative from Cavite's 4th district by 261 House members, 14 voted against, and 8 abstained. He became the third member of Congress to be expelled from the House of Representatives after Arnie Teves in 2023 and Dominador Gómez in 1908. A special election was held on August 29, 2026 to complete Barzaga's term in the 20th congress. Barzaga endorsed his mother in the special election. His mother won the special election in a landslide.

== Political positions ==
=== Animal welfare ===
Having pet cats himself, Barzaga has animal welfare as one of his well-known platforms, calling himself as "Congressmeow" and using cat motifs for his campaign for the 2025 election. He also positioned himself as pro-posadog (stray cats and dogs).

Barzaga advocates for veterinary services. He has implemented spay and neuter in Dasmariñas, an initiative he hopes to be implemented at a nationwide scale.

Inspired by Senator Bong Go's Malasakit Centers, Barzaga supports providing medical assistance for cats and dogs and create a Malasakit Center for them.

=== Artificial intelligence ===
Barzaga proposed regulation for AI on a Facebook post and in another separate post he said that AI is a violation of copyright and believes it will damage the art industry. He also believes that full disclosure must be made on the usage of AI for political and commercial purposes.

=== Death penalty ===
Barzaga has proposed the punishment of death penalty for various crimes including mass murder, rape, habitual littering, and animal abuse.

He stated that "Penalties for small crimes like littering should gradually become more severe for repeat offenders.", if the offender reaches the 50th offense, they should get imprisoned and by the 100th offense, they should get the death penalty, Barzaga later defended this proposal.

For animal abusers he proposed the death penalty by firing squad. He also supports imposing the death penalty for mass murderers and child rapists, saying that keeping them alive in prison for decades is a waste of government resources. He also indirectly suggested that rapists who are minors must be given the death penalty believing that since they committed the crime at a young age that they have "no future" in society.

=== Political dynasties ===
A member of a political dynasty himself, Barzaga believed that the proposed Anti-Political Dynasty Bill will fail to pass because majority of Filipino politicians belong to such dynasties and would be unlikely to vote against their interests.

=== Divorce ===
Barzaga proposed absolute divorce for violation through abuse, infidelity, and serious criminal acts through House Bill No. 4945 filed on September 30, 2025.

=== Secessionism ===
Barzaga in October 2025 has called Mindanao to secede from the Philippines amidst the flood control project scandal alleging the Marcos administration and Metro Manila-based politicians as corrupt. He claimed that politicians from Metro Manila are at the forefront of the flood control project scandal and that Mindanao is seen as "less important" than Luzon. In November 2025, he renewed calls of secessionism including the Visayas as well.

=== Philippine Coast Guard ===
Barzaga on October 28, 2025, called for the abolition of the Philippine Coast Guard, labeling it a "waste of government funds" and a "corrupt organization" that grants auxiliary ranking positions to political figures. He also claimed the agency's operations in the South China Sea could "cause World War III". PCG spokesperson Commodore Jay Tarriela refuted the claims, citing those as misleading and unfounded.

=== Taxation ===
Barzaga proposed the abolition of the existing 12-percent value-added tax on goods and services through House Bill No. 5119, which he filed on October 6, 2025. He argued that VAT is regressive, imposing a financial burden on ordinary consumers as it is applied universally regardless of their ability to pay. He plans to offset the lost VAT revenue by proposing measures for a revised taxation system.

== Personal life ==
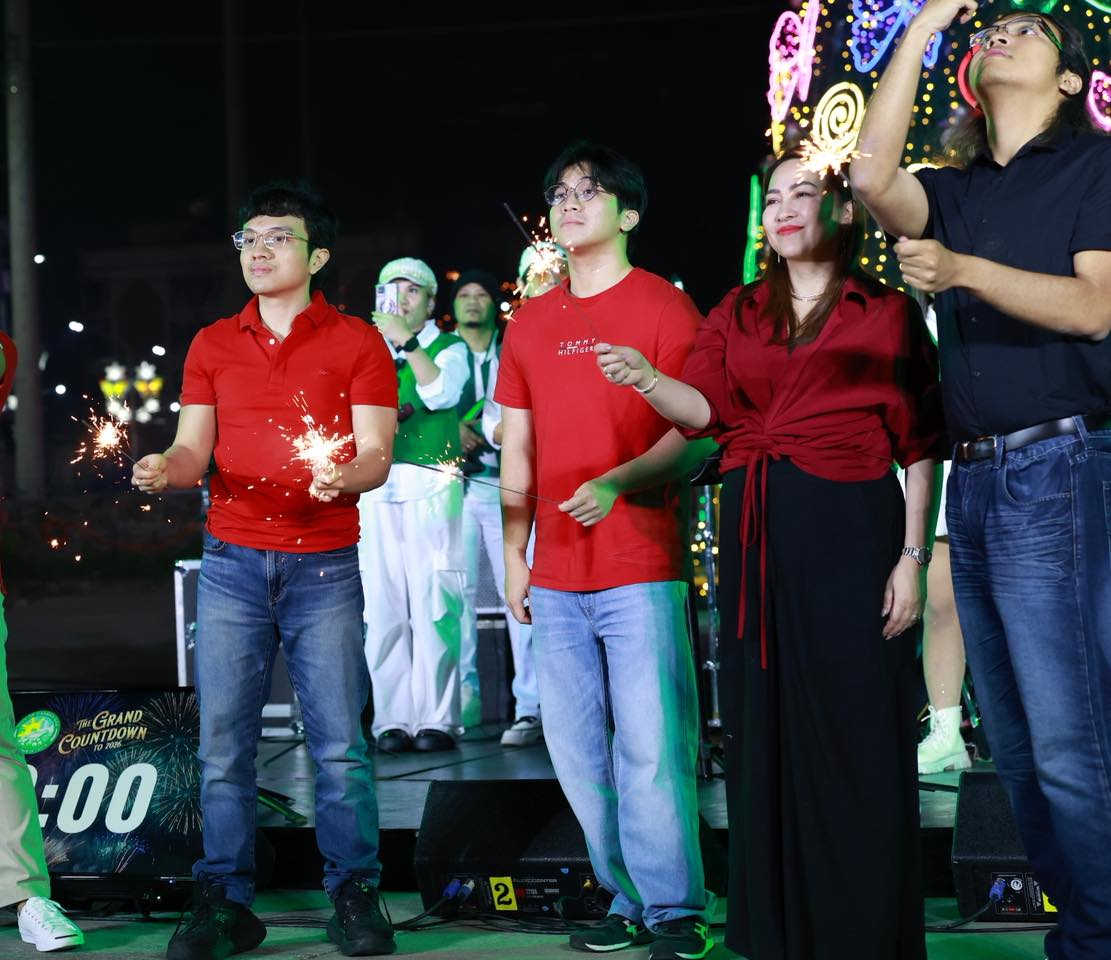
Barzaga (far left) with his brother Third, his mother Jenny, and his brother Enzo Barzaga at the City of Dasmariñas Arena for the 2026 New Year's Countdown

Barzaga is a self-admitted nepo baby and member of a political dynasty. He claims that his political family is among the oldest in Cavite. Barzaga is also involved in sports, namely boxing, taekwondo and Arnis.

== Military service ==
Barzaga was enlisted into the Philippine Army Reserve as a private in the National Capital Region Regional Community Defense Group (NCRRDG) on January 10, 2025.

On September 21, 2025, the Armed Forces of the Philippines removed Barzaga from its reserve force for violating military regulations after he publicly called for military personnel to join anti-corruption protests. Without evidence, he alleged that the AFP had ₱15 billion worth of "ghost projects" in response to his delisting.

== Electoral history ==
Electoral history of Kiko Barzaga
Year	Office	Party	Votes Barzaga received				Result
Year	Office	Party	Total	%	P.	Swing	Result
2019	Councilor (Dasmariñas)	NUP	158,957		4th	—N/a	Won
2022	Councilor (Dasmariñas)	NUP	212,781	7.97%	1st	—N/a	Won
2025	Representative (Cavite–4th)	NUP	165,942	50.37%	1st	—N/a	Won

== See also ==
- List of members of the Philippine House of Representatives expelled, removed, or suspended
