= Legislative districts of Cavite =

Map of Cavite's congressional districts since 2018

The legislative districts of Cavite are the representations of the province of Cavite in the various national and local legislatures of the Philippines. At present, the province is represented in the House of Representatives of the Philippines by its eight congressional districts, with the districts' representatives being elected every three years. The congressional districts are coextensive with the provincial board districts, where each district is allotted two seats in the Cavite Provincial Board, creating a total of sixteen elective seats in the legislature.

== History ==
Cavite initially comprised a single district in 1898, when it elected four representatives to the Malolos Congress that lasted until 1899. The district was recreated in 1907 for the Philippine Assembly, this time electing one representative at-large. When seats for the upper house of the Philippine Legislature were elected from territory-based districts between 1916 and 1935, the province formed part of the fifth senatorial district which elected two out of the 24-member senate.

In the disruption caused by the Second World War, two delegates represented the province in the National Assembly of the Japanese-sponsored Second Philippine Republic: one was the provincial governor (an ex officio member), while the other was elected through a provincial assembly of KALIBAPI members during the Japanese occupation of the Philippines. Cavite City, being a chartered city, was represented separately in this short-lived legislative body. Tagaytay, the province's other chartered city, was placed under provincial jurisdiction during the war and was not represented separately. Upon the restoration of the Philippine Commonwealth in 1945, the province and its two cities reverted to the pre-war lone district representation.

The province was represented in the Interim Batasang Pambansa as part of Region IV-A from 1978 to 1984, and returned three representatives, elected at large, to the Regular Batasang Pambansa in 1984. Cavite was reapportioned into three congressional districts under the new Constitution which was proclaimed on February 11, 1987, and elected members to the restored House of Representatives starting that same year.

The passage of Republic Act No. 9727 on October 22, 2009, increased the number of the province's representatives from three to seven, starting in the 2010 elections. However, the conversion of Dasmariñas into a city has resulted in an additional legal name for the fourth district, which became the Lone District of Dasmariñas after the ratification of Republic Act No. 9723 on November 25, 2009.

Meanwhile, despite the conversion of Bacoor and Imus into cities in 2012, their charters explicitly indicate the retention of their numerical designations as the second and third districts of the province.

Republic Act No. 11069, signed into law on September 17, 2018, reapportioned Cavite into eight legislative districts — the most for any province — by creating a separate legislative district for the newly converted city of General Trias. This effectively supersedes RA No. 9723 and confirms the sole legal designation of the congressional district of Dasmariñas as the fourth district of Cavite.

== Current congressional districts ==
The province's current congressional delegation composes of six members of the National Unity Party, one member of Lakas–CMD and one member of the Nationalist People's Coalition.

Legislative districts and representatives of Cavite
District	Current Representative			Constituent LGUs	Population (2024)	Area	Map
District	Image	Name	Party	Constituent LGUs	Population (2024)	Area	Map
1st		Jolo Revilla (since 2022); Rosario	NUP	List: Cavite City; Kawit; Noveleta; Rosario	380,048	88.34 km^{2}	
2nd		Lani Mercado (since 2022); Bacoor	Lakas	List: Bacoor	661,381	46.17 km^{2}	
3rd		Adrian Jay Advincula (since 2022); Imus	NUP	List: Imus	481,949	64.70 km^{2}	
4th		Jenny Barzaga (since 2026); Dasmariñas	NUP	List: Dasmariñas	744,511	90.13 km^{2}	
5th		Roy Loyola (since 2022); Carmona	NPC	List: Carmona; General Mariano Alvarez; Silang	602,212	245.61 km^{2}	
6th		Antonio Ferrer (since 2022); General Trias	NUP	List: General Trias	482,453	81.46 km^{2}	
7th		Crispin Diego Remulla (since 2023); Indang	NUP	List: Amadeo; Indang; Tanza; Trece Martires	681,482	251.75 km^{2}	
8th		Aniela Tolentino (since 2022); Tagaytay	NUP	List: Alfonso; General Emilio Aguinaldo; Magallanes; Maragondon; Mendez; Naic; Tagaytay; Ternate	538,308	558.1 km^{2}	

== Historical districts ==
=== Lone congressional district (1898–1986) ===
Period	Representative	Constituents
Malolos Congress; 1898–1899	Severino de las Alas	Cavite
Malolos Congress; 1898–1899	José Basa	Cavite
Malolos Congress; 1898–1899	Hugo Ilagan	Cavite
Malolos Congress; 1898–1899	José Salamanca	Cavite
1st Philippine Legislature; 1907–1909	Rafael V. Palma (Note: Appointed as member of the second Philippine Commission on July 6, 1908)	Cavite
2nd Philippine Legislature; 1909–1912	Emiliano Tría Tirona	Cavite
3rd Philippine Legislature; 1912–1916	Florentino Joya	Cavite
4th Philippine Legislature; 1916–1919	Emiliano Tría Tirona	Cavite
5th Philippine Legislature; 1919–1922	Emilio F. Virata	Cavite
6th Philippine Legislature; 1922–1925	Pedro P. Espiritu	Cavite
7th Philippine Legislature; 1925–1928	Augusto A. Reyes (Note: Died on July 3, 1925)	Cavite
7th Philippine Legislature; 1925–1928	Antero S. Soriano (Note: Assumed office after winning a special election) (Note: Died on June 15, 1929)	Cavite
8th Philippine Legislature; 1928–1931	Antero S. Soriano	Cavite
8th Philippine Legislature; 1928–1931	Fidel Ibañez	Cavite
9th Philippine Legislature; 1931–1934	Emiliano Tría Tirona	Cavite
10th Philippine Legislature; 1934–1935	Francisco Arca	Cavite
1st National Assembly; 1935–1938	Justiniano S. Montano (Note: Election annulled on October 11, 1939 after an election protest)	Cavite
2nd National Assembly; 1938–1941	Justiniano S. Montano	Cavite
2nd National Assembly; 1938–1941	Manuel S. Rojas (Note: Declared winner of the 1938 election)	Cavite
National Assembly; 1943–1944	Emiliano Tría Tirona	Cavite (except Cavite City)
National Assembly; 1943–1944	Luis Y. Ferrer (ex officio)	Cavite (except Cavite City)
1st Commonwealth Congress; 1945	Justiniano S. Montano	Cavite
1st Congress; 1946–1949	Justiniano S. Montano	Cavite
2nd Congress; 1949–1953	Manuel S. Rojas	Cavite
3rd Congress; 1953–1957	Jose T. Cajulis	Cavite
4th Congress; 1957–1961	Justiniano S. Montano	Cavite
5th Congress; 1961–1965	Justiniano S. Montano	Cavite
6th Congress; 1965–1969	Justiniano S. Montano	Cavite
7th Congress; 1969–1972	Justiniano S. Montano	Cavite
Regular Batasang Pambansa; 1984–1986	Helena Zoila T. Benitez	Cavite
Regular Batasang Pambansa; 1984–1986	Renato P. Dragon	Cavite
Regular Batasang Pambansa; 1984–1986	Cesar E.A. Virata	Cavite

== See also ==
- Legislative district of Cavite City
- Legislative district of Dasmariñas
