= Bacoor City Council =

Legislative body of Bacoor City, Cavite, Philippines

Bacoor City Council Sangguniang Panlungsod ng Bacoor
- 5th Bacoor City Council

Type
- Type: Unicameral
- Term limits: 3 terms (9 years)

Leadership
- Presiding Officer: Rowena Bautista-Mendiola, NPC
- Presiding Officer pro tempore: Reynaldo D. Palabrica, Lakas

Structure
- Seats: 14 councilors and 1 presiding officer
- Political groups: Nacionalista (4) Lakas (4) NPC (4) Nonpartisan (2)
- Length of term: 3 years
- Authority: Bacoor City Charter; Local Government Code of the Philippines

Elections
- Voting system: Plurality-at-large voting
- Last election: May 9, 2022
- Next election: May 12, 2025

Meeting place
- City of Bacoor Government Center

Website
- Website

The City Council of Bacoor (Filipino: Sangguniang Panlungsod ng Bacoor) is the legislature of the Bacoor, Cavite. It is composed of 12 councilors, with 6 councilors elected from Bacoor's two councilor districts, two councilors elected from the ranks of Liga ng mga Barangay ng Bacoor chairperson and the Sangguniang Kabataan chairperson. The presiding officer of the council is the vice mayor, who is elected citywide. It is also the city's chief executive whenever the mayor is out of the city. It is elected to serve a three-year term, with a maximum of three terms.

The council is responsible for creating laws and ordinances under Bacoor's jurisdiction. The mayor can veto proposed bills, but the council can override it with a two-thirds supermajority.

The city council's headquarters is at the City of Bacoor Government Center in Barangay Bayanan.

== History ==
On July 25, 2011, President Benigno Aquino III signed Republic Act No. 10160 creating the City of Bacoor. It was ratified through a plebiscite on June 23, 2012, wherein most of the town's participating registered voters favored the cityhood.

With the incorporation of Bacoor as a city, it was divided into two legislative districts, Bacoor West (District 1) and Bacoor East (District 2). During the 2013 mid-term elections, the citizens of Bacoor voted for six councilors for each of the two districts.

== Powers, duties and functions ==
The Sangguniang Panlungsod, as the legislative body of the city, is mandated by the Local Government Code of 1991 (Republic Act No. 7160) to:

- Enact ordinances;
- Approve resolutions;
- Appropriate funds for the general welfare of the city and its inhabitants; and
- Ensure the proper exercise of the corporate powers of the city as provided for under Section 22 of the Local Government Code.

Furthermore, the following duties and functions are relegated to the Sangguniang Panlungsod:

- Approve ordinances and pass resolutions necessary for an efficient and effective city government;
- Generate and maximize the use of resources and revenues for the development plans, program objectives, and priorities of the city as provided for under section 18 of the Local Government Code of 1991, with particular attention to agro-industrial development and citywide growth and progress;
- Enact ordinances granting franchises and authorizing the issuance of permits or licenses, upon such conditions and for such purposes intended to promote the general welfare of the inhabitants of the city but subject to the provisions of Book II of the Local Government Code of 1991;
- Regulate activities relative to the use of land, buildings, and structures within the city to promote the general welfare of its inhabitants;
- Approve ordinances which shall ensure the efficient and effective delivery of the basic services and facilities as provided for under Section 17 of the Local Government Code; and
- Exercise such other powers and perform such other duties and functions as may prescribed by law or ordinance.

== Membership ==
Each of Bacoor's two councilor districts elects six councilors to the council. In plurality-at-large voting, a voter may vote for up to six candidates, with the candidates having the six highest number of votes being elected. In addition, the barangay and the SK chairpersons throughout the city elect amongst themselves their representatives to the council. Hence, there are 14 councilors.

City council elections are synchronized with other elections in the country. Elections are held every first Monday of May every third year since 2013 for 12 seats, while the ex officio seats are elected irregularly, but always proceeding a Barangay and SK elections.

=== Incumbent Members ===
These are the members after the 2025 local elections:

Members of 5th Bacoor City Council (2025–2028)
Position	Name	Party
Presiding Officer (Vice Mayor)	Rowena Bautista-Mendiola	NPC
Bacoor West Councilors	Catherine Sarino-Evaristo	Nacionalista
Bacoor West Councilors	Miguel N. Bautista	NPC
Bacoor West Councilors	Manolo S. Galvez, Jr.	Lakas
Bacoor West Councilors	Andrelito G. Gawaran	Lakas
Bacoor West Councilors	Levy M. Tela	NPC
Bacoor West Councilors	Ricardo F. Ugalde	NPC
Bacoor East Councilors	Roberto L. Advincula	Nacionalista
Bacoor East Councilors	Simplicio G. Dominguez	Nacionalista
Bacoor East Councilors	Reynaldo M. Fabian	NPC
Bacoor East Councilors	Rogelio M. Nolasco	Nacionalista
Bacoor East Councilors	Horacio M. Brillantes, Jr.	Lakas
Bacoor East Councilors	Reynaldo D. Palabrica	Lakas
President, Liga ng mga Barangay	Randy C. Francisco (Daang Bukid)	Nonpartisan
President, Sangguniang Kabataan Federation	Palm Angel S. Buncio (Molino IV)	Nonpartisan

=== Former Members ===
==== Presiding Officer (Vice Mayor) ====
Name	Council	Term
Catherine Sarino-Evaristo	1st–3rd	2013–2016; 2016–2019; 2019–2022

==== Bacoor West District ====
Name	Council	Term
Rowena Bautista-Mendiola	1st–2nd	2013–2016; 2016–2019
Venus D. de Castro	1st–2nd	2013–2016; 2016–2019
Reynaldo M. Fabian	1st (transferred to Bacoor East)	2013–2016
Edwin G. Gawaran	1st–3rd	2013–2016; 2016–2019; 2019–2022
Victorio L. Guerrero, Jr.	3rd–4th	2019–2022; 2022–2023 (died in office)
Alejandro F. Gutierrez	2nd–4th	2016–2019; 2019–2022; 2022–2025
Avelino B. Solis	1st	2013–2016
Michael E. Solis	2nd–4th	2016–2019; 2019–2022; 2022–2025

==== Bacoor East District ====
Name	Council	Term
Apolonio I. Advincula, Jr.	2nd	2016–2018
Bayani M. de Leon	1st	2013–2016
Leandro M. de Leon	1st–2nd	2013–2016; 2016–2019
Hernando "King" C. Gutierrez	1st–2nd	2013–2016; 2016–2019
Roberto R. Javier	1st–2nd	2013–2016; 2016–2019
Gaudencio P. Nolasco	1st	2013–2016
Alde Joselito F. Pagulayan	2nd–4th	2016–2019; 2019–2022; 2022–2025

=== Ex-officio members ===
Liga ng Mga Barangay President
Name	Barangay	Council	Term
Victorio L. Guerrero, Jr.	Salinas II	1st–2nd	2013–2018
Reynaldo D. Palabrica	Queen's Row Central	2nd–3rd	2018–2022
Ramon N. Bautista	Habay II	3rd–4th	2022–2024
Randy C. Francisco	Daang Bukid	4th	2024–present

SK Federation President
Name	Barangay	Council	Term
Ma Eliza H. Bautista	Habay II	1st	2013
Seat vacated from 2013–2018
Mac Raven Espiritu	Daang Bukid	3rd–4th	2018–2023
Palm Angel S. Buncio	Molino IV	4th	2023–present
