= BGC =

BGC may refer to:

== Organisations ==
- BGC Group (previously BGC Partners), American financial services company
- Bakalia Government College, college in Bangladesh
- Bankgirocentralen, Sweden, operators of the Bankgirot system
- Baptist General Conference, US
- Barasat Government College, college in India
- Bard Graduate Center, Bard College, New York City, US
- Berkeley Geochronology Center, California, US
- Black Girls Code, providing technology education to African-American girls
- BGC (company), Australian construction company
- BARMM Grand Coalition, a political alliance in the Philippines

== Places ==
- Bonifacio Global City, Taguig, Metro Manila, Philippines
- City of Bacoor Government Center, Bacoor, Cavite, Philippines

== Mass media ==
- Bad Girls Club, US TV show 2006 to 2017

== Other uses ==
- Background garbage collection, in flash memory
- BGC, the surname of the French Class B 81500 (for dual-mode AGC or in French, Bi-mode AGC)
- Background check, per a common initialism in business communication
- Biosynthetic gene cluster, set of genes
