= Florentino Torres High School =

Public high school in Manila, Philippines

- Mataas na Paaralang Florentino Torres

Location
- NCR, Metro Manila; 2517 Juan Luna St, Gagalangin, Tondo, Manila, National Capital Region; Manila, Philippines
- Coordinates: 14°37′38.374″N 120°58′21.782″E

Information
- Other name: Torres High School
- Former name: Manila West High School
- Type: Public High School
- Motto: Pamalagiin ang Liwanag (Let There Be Light)
- Established: October 16, 1925 (100 years ago)
- Founder: James T. Burns
- School district: 2
- School code: 305298
- Principal: Maria Eva S. Nacion, Principal IV
- Grades: 7 to 10
- Enrollment: 1,000 to 2,000
- Language: English, Filipino
- Student Union/Association: SSLG (Supreme Secondary Learner Government)
- Colors: Gold and Maroon
- Slogan: Walang Uuna Sa Torres High
- Song: Torres March (lnstrumental) By J.O Cristobal
- Newspaper: The Torres Torch (Filipino: Ang Sulo)
- Affiliations: Division of City Schools-Manila

Florentino Torres High School, commonly known as Torres High School (FTHS), is located in Juan Luna St, Gagalangin, Tondo, Manila, Philippines. It is one of the oldest public schools in Metro Manila.

== History ==
Founded by James T. Burns in 1925, Florentino Torres High School was originally named Legarda High School. With only three teachers, Burns opened the school to students who were refused admission by the three existing public high schools in Manila.

In 1926, the school moved to the Sequoia Building at the foot of Pritil Bridge along Juan Luna Street and was renamed Manila West High School. March 1928 marked the first group of students to graduate from the school as well as the initial appearance of various school clubs and organizations. In 1930, several changes took place under the supervision of Marcelino Bautista, the first Filipino principal, who renamed the four Manila public high schools after the first four Filipino Justices of the Supreme Court:

- Manila West High School became Florentino Torres High School, in honor of Justice Florentino Torres, the first Associate Justice of the Supreme Court of the Philippines.
- Manila North High School became Arellano High School, in honor of Justice Cayetano Arellano
- Manila South High School became Araullo High School, in honor of Justice Manuel Araullo
- Manila East High School became V. Mapa High School, in honor of Justice Victorino Mapa

The maiden issue of The Torres Torch, the official school paper, was published in 1930. In 1937, the school formally occupied the Constabulary Barracks in Gagalangin, where it is located today. With the outbreak of World War II in 1941, the school ceased operation, and the buildings were redeployed as garrisons. During this period, all school records were destroyed.

On July 16, 1945, the school re-opened with Pablo Reyes as principal. On November 24, 1945, the first post-Liberation group of 30 students received their diplomas. On October 16, 1953, the school first celebrated its foundation day under Mr. Cesario Bandong as the principal.

On the following years, Florentino Torres High School had continued giving quality education to the youth of Manila under Dr. Emiliano Rafael (1968–1972), Mr. Alfonso Asuncion (1973), Mr. Rufino dela Cruz (1974–1976) and Dr. Dominador Wingsing (1977).

In 1978, the first female principal came, Mrs. Severa Saldana. She started the open-shelf system in the library to give the students the freedom to learn. She was also the one who headed the repairs of the corridor, school offices, media room and canteen, for the Torresians and teachers to be more persevering and efficient.

In addition, many projects were finished under her term, like classrooms and buildings of the Technology and Home Economics department. After Saldana, the next principals who governed FTHS were Dr. Consolacion Domingo (1984), Dr. Florie Balanag (1986-1991), Ms. Adoracion Acuna (1991–1995), Mrs. Norma Escobar (1995–1998), and Mrs. Pilar Pizarro (1998–2001) that were really great principals who brought out the success and progress of the school.

Year 2001, when another principal started his term and was in the person of Dr. Romeo Santos, who brought a lot of changes in the school. Dr. Santos was known for his program "Five Senses Approach" in teaching, and also, his untiring supervision of ongoing classes as part of his effective management of the school. The "Open Gate Policy" was also implemented by Dr. Santos to fully organize the class schedule of the students, specially in the lower sections. Year 2003, when the FTHS was chosen by the Ayala Foundation in their project "Adopt-a-School Program" wherein the school received free computer equipment. In addition, Dr. Santos gave more excitement and color for the lives of third and fourth year students when he brought back the Juniors-Seniors Promenade.

== Curriculum ==
=== Japanese Class ===
Through the Department of Education's "Special Program in Foreign Language" (SPFL) and The Japan Foundation, Manila, Florentino Torres High School currently offers Japanese classes for students from all year levels. The program focuses on Japanese language, arts, and culture, while featuring various activities such as a Sanshin workshop and the Kaisha Caravan.

== Notable alumni ==
- Pablo Gomez Sarino, former and longest serving municipal mayor of Bacoor, Cavite
- Raymundo Punongbayan, former Director of Philippine Institute of Volcanology and Seismology (PHIVOLCS)
- Francisco Arcellana, National Artist of the Philippines for Literature
- Isagani Yambot, Philippine Daily Inquirer publisher
- Rodolfo Vera Quizon - Actor, comedian
- Jerald Napoles - TV / Movie Actor

== Former principals ==
| Principals | Year/s of Service |
|---|---|
| James T. Burns | 1925–1929 |
| Harry Hanzelmayer | 1929 |
| George Lyman | 1929–1930 |
| Marcelino Bautista | 1930–1935 |
| Fortunato de Veyra | 1935 |
| Pedro Guiang | 1935–1936 |
| Ricardo Castro | 1936–1939 |
| Delfin Reynaldo | 1939–1940 |
| Maximo Jimenez | 1940–1941 |
| Pablo Reyes | 1945–1953 |
| Cesario Bandong | 1953–1966 |
| Emiliano Rafael | 1966–1974 |
| Alfonso Asuncion | 1974–1975 |
| Rufino de la Cruz | 1976–1977 |
| Dominador Wingsing | 1977–1978 |
| Severa H. Saldana | 1978–1984 |
| Dr. Consolacion C. Domingo | 1984–1985 |
| Dr. Florie M. Balanag | 1986–1990 |
| Adoracion Acuna | 1991–1995 |
| Dr. Norma Escobar | 1995 – December 1997 |
| Pilar G. Pizzaro | February 1998 – December 2000 |
| Dr. Romeo B. Santos | January 2000 – February 2001 |
| Dr. Romeo B. Santos | April 2001 – May 2006 |
| Rosita C. Herson | July 2006 – January 2013 |
| Gene T. Pangilinan | July 2013 – April 2017 |
| Maria Pura Santillian Talattad | May 2017 – Dec 2023 |
| Maria Eva S. Nacion | Jan 2024 – Present |
