= 2022 Bacoor local elections =

Philippine local election

2022 Bacoor mayoral election
← 2019	May 9, 2022	2025 →
		IND
Nominee	Strike Revilla	Jose Francisco
Party	Nacionalista	Independent
Running mate	Rowena Bautista-Mendiola (NPC)	Meliza Cubinar
Popular vote	178,388	22,767
Percentage	88.68	11.32
Mayor before election
Lani Mercado-Revilla
Lakas
Elected mayor
Strike Revilla
Nacionalista

Local elections were held in Bacoor on May 9, 2022, within the Philippine general election. Registered voters of the city will be electing candidates for the following elective local posts: the mayor, the vice mayor, the lone district representative, the two provincial board members for Cavite's second district, and the twelve councilors, six in each of the city's two local legislative districts (Note: As per Article 4 Section 10 of Republic Act 10160 or the City Charter of Bacoor, Bacoor's Sangguniang Panglungsod districts should be officially referred to as Bacoor West and Bacoor East. They are currently referred to on orders of the city government as Districts 1 and 2, respectively.).

== Electoral system ==
Just like in any election in the Philippines, the electoral system is based on first-past-the-post voting.

Elections for mayor, vice mayor, lone district representative and the two board members are done at an at-large basis. Elections for members of the Sangguniang Panlungsod of Bacoor are via the electoral districts as defined by the city charter. It will be done via multiple non-transferable vote, with the candidates with six highest votes winning.

There are an additional two ex officio seats in the city council, for the city federation presidents of the Liga ng mga Barangay (village chairpersons' league) and the Sangguniang Kabataan (youth council league). These were originally elected in 2018, and whose terms were extended until 2022. Separate elections for these bodies will be in December 2022.

== Background ==
Incumbent city mayor and former Cavite second district representative (2010-2016) Lani Mercado-Revilla, the winner of Bacoor's last hotly-contested elections in 2016, is not running for another term despite her being qualified to do so as she is only on her second term as city mayor, opting to vie for the open position of representative. She is swapping with her brother-in-law, incumbent district representative Edwin "Strike" Revilla, who is also on his second term in the said position. Strike's opponent will be Jose Francisco, who competed for the same position in 2019 but lost to Lani.

On the other hand, incumbent vice mayor Catherine Sariño-Evaristo is already on her third term as vice mayor (she was Strike Revilla's vice mayor on his last term in 2013) and is disqualified from re-election. She will be running instead city councilor for Bacoor West. Strike's older sister, incumbent West councilor and one-time Imus City, Cavite councilor in the 1990s Rowena Bautista-Mendiola, will be his running mate. Rowena will be opposed by Meliza Sison-Cubinar, who unsuccessfully ran for Bacoor West councilor in 2019.

== Candidates ==
=== Team Revilla ===
Nacionalista/Team Revilla
#	Name	Party
For House Of Representatives
3.	Lani Mercado-Revilla	Lakas
For Mayor
2.	Strike Revilla	Nacionalista
For Vice Mayor
1.	Rowena Bautista-Mendiola	NPC
For Councilor (Bacoor West)
1.	Adrielito Gawaran	Lakas
2.	Victorio Guerrero Jr.	Lakas
3.	Alejandro Gutierrez	NPC
4.	Catherine "Karen" Sariño-Evaristo	Nacionalista
5.	Michael Solis	Nacionalista
6.	Levy Tela	Lakas
For Councilor (Bacoor East)
1.	Roberto Advincula	Nacionalista
2.	Simplicio Dominguez	Nacionalista
3.	Reynaldo Fabian	NPC
6.	Rogelio "Bok" Nolasco	Nacionalista
8.	Alde Joselito Pagulayan	Lakas
9.	Reynaldo Palabrica	Lakas

== Mayoralty and vice mayoralty elections ==
Bacoor Mayoralty Election
Party	Candidate	Votes	%
Nacionalista	Strike Revilla	178,388	88.68
Independent	Jose Francisco	22,767	11.32
Total votes		201,155	100.00
Nacionalista hold			

Bacoor Vice Mayoralty Election
Party	Candidate	Votes	%
NPC	Rowena Bautista-Mendiola	154,179	82.70
Independent	Meliza Cubinar	32,263	17.30
Total votes		186,442	100.00
NPC hold			

== Congressional elections ==
2022 Philippine House of Representatives election in Cavite's 2nd congressional district
Party	Candidate	Votes	%
Lakas	Lani Mercado-Revilla	168,385	86.05
Independent	Jose Herminio Japson	18,142	9.27
Independent	George Abraham Ber Ado	9,158	4.68
Total votes		195,685	100.00

== Sangguniang Panlalawigan elections ==
2022 Provincial Board Election in 2nd Sangguniang Panlalawigan District of Cavite
Party	Candidate	Votes	%
Lakas	Ramon Vicente "Ramboy" Revilla	143,097	7.65
Lakas	Edwin Malvar	126,923	6.78
Total votes		270,020	100.00

== Sangguniang Panlungsod elections ==
Party	Votes	%	Seats
Nacionalista Party	332,332	38.31	5
Lakas-CMD	323,203	37.25	5
Nationalist People's Coalition	123,395	14.22	2
Pederalismo ng Dugong Dakilang Samahan	46,450	5.35	–
Independent	42,182	4.86	–
Ex officio seats			2
Total	867,562	100.00	14

=== Bacoor West District ===
Bacoor City Council election - Bacoor West
Party	Candidate	Votes	%
Nacionalista	Catherine "Karen" Sariño-Evaristo	78,162	33.48
Nacionalista	Michael Solis	74,058	31.73
Lakas	Adrielito Gawaran	70,759	30.31
Lakas	Victorio Guerrero Jr.	65,825	28.20
NPC	Alejandro Gutierrez	63,294	27.11
Lakas	Levy Tela	61,828	26.49
Total votes		413,926	100.00

Party or alliance		Votes	%	Seats
Team Revilla	Lakas-CMD	198,412	47.93	3
Team Revilla	Nacionalista Party	152,220	36.77	2
Team Revilla	Nationalist People's Coalition	63,294	15.29	1
Team Revilla	Total	413,926	100.00	6
Total		413,926	100.00	6

=== Bacoor East District ===
Bacoor City Council election - Bacoor East
Party	Candidate	Votes	%
Nacionalista	Roberto Advincula	68,996	29.56
Lakas	Reynaldo Palabrica	66,593	28.53
NPC	Reynaldo Fabian	60,101	25.75
Nacionalista	Rogelio "Bok" Nolasco	59,274	25.39
Lakas	Alde Joselito Pagulayan	58,198	24.93
Nacionalista	Simplicio Dominguez	51,842	22.21
PDDS	Rose Nolasco	46,450	19.90
Independent	Denis Lopez	24,943	10.69
Independent	Mark Dale Fernandez	17,239	7.39
Total votes		453,636	100.00

Party or alliance		Votes	%	Seats
Team Revilla	Nacionalista Party	180,112	39.70	3
Team Revilla	Lakas-CMD	124,791	27.51	2
Team Revilla	Nationalist People's Coalition	60,101	13.25	1
Team Revilla	Total	365,004	80.46	6
Pederalismo ng Dugong Dakilang Samahan		46,450	10.24	0
Independent		42,182	9.30	0
Total		453,636	100.00	6
