= BGCC =

BGCC may refer to:

- Bakalia Government College, Chittagong
- Barnt Green Cricket Club
- Baptist General Conference of Canada
- Bogura City Corporation
- Boys & Girls Clubs of Canada
