= Pablo Sarino =

Filipino politician

The Honorable Pablo Gomez Sarino
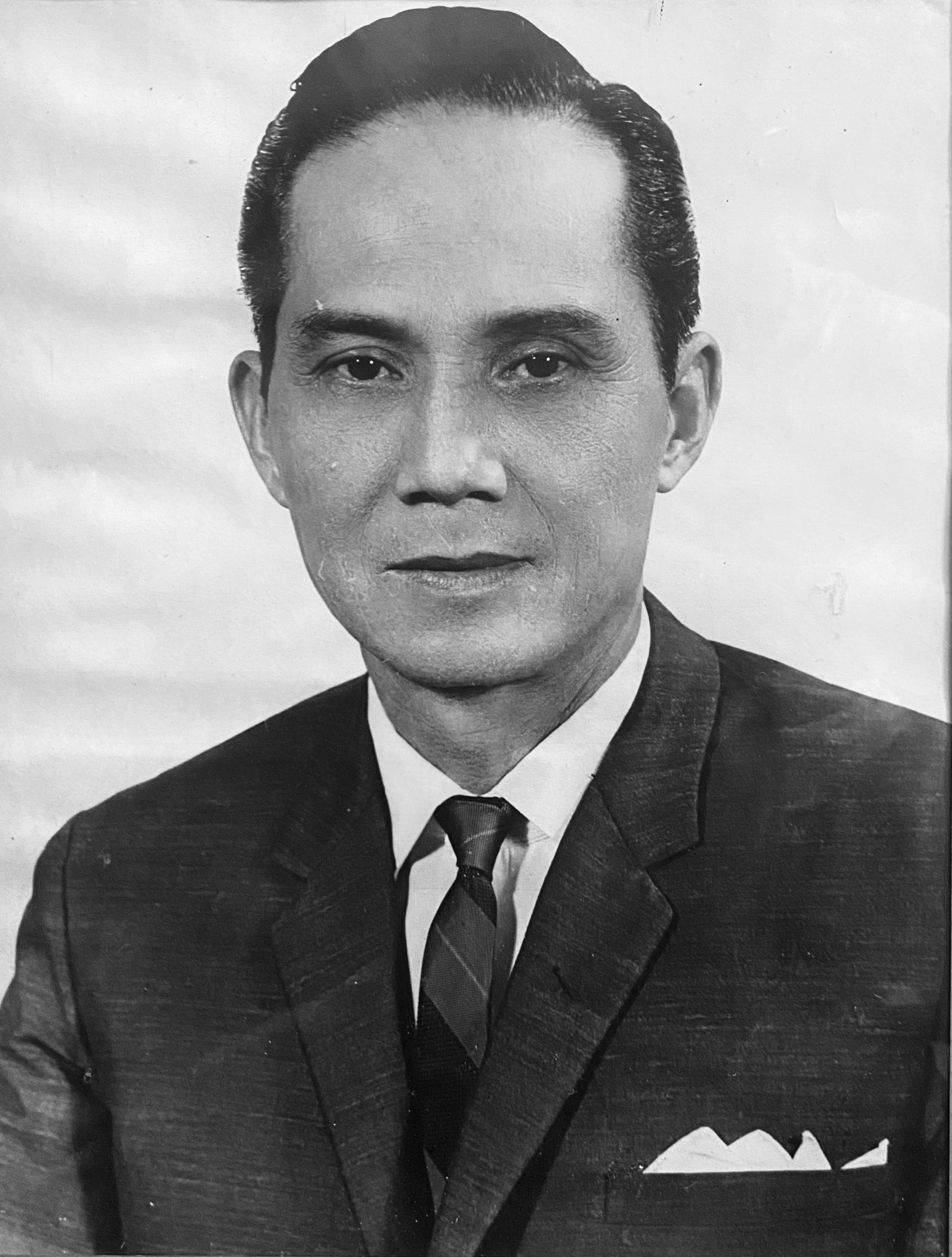
- Official portrait of Mayor Pablo G. Sarino

Mayor of Bacoor
- In office 1971–1986
- Preceded by: Benigno Guinto
- Succeeded by: Benjamin Enriquez Sr. (as OIC)
- In office 1959–1967
- Preceded by: Benigno Guinto
- Succeeded by: Benigno Guinto

Member of the Bacoor Municipal Council
- In office 1951–1959

Personal details
- Born: Pablo Gomez Sarino; June 29, 1911 Bacoor, Cavite, Philippine Islands
- Died: December 23, 1987 (aged 76) Bacoor, Cavite, Philippines
- Resting place: Familia Gomez-Sarino Mausoleum, Maliksi Municipal Cemetery
- Party: KBL (1978–1986)
- Other political affiliations: Liberal (1951–1959; 1963–1972); Nacionalista (1959–1963)
- Spouse: Pacita Legaspi (m. 1948)
- Parents: Pedro Sarino y Mariano; Francisca Gómez y Jaro
- Relatives: P. Mariano Gómes de los Ángeles (great grand-uncle); Mariano Trias (2nd cousin once removed); Gobernadorcillo Epifanio Gómez (grand-uncle)
- Education: Mapua Institute of Technology (did not finish); Torres High School
- Occupation: Businessman
- Known for: Longest serving mayor of Bacoor, Cavite

Pablo Gomez Sarino (June 29, 1911 – December 23, 1987) was a Filipino politician who served as the municipal mayor of Bacoor, Cavite. He previously served as a municipal councilor and later became elected as the mayor in 1959. His terms of office in total made him the longest serving mayor of Bacoor to date.

== Early life ==
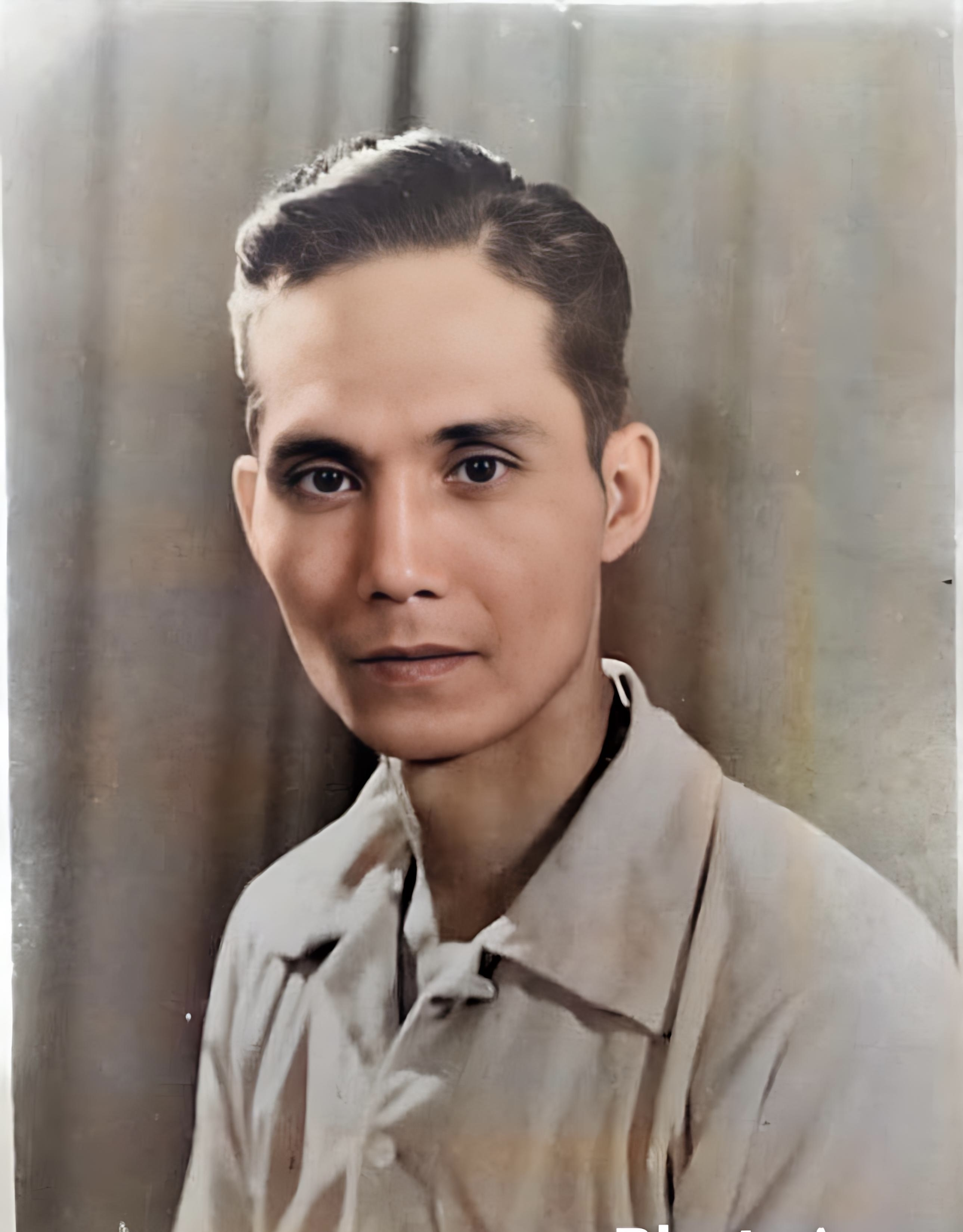
Early portrait of Pablo G. Sarino

Pablo Sarino was born on June 29, 1911, in Bacoor, Cavite to Pedro Mariano Sarino and Francisca Jaro Gomez. His name was derived from his birthdate, the feast of Sts. Peter and Paul. His paternal grandparents were Don Eugenio Sarino Cobarrúvia and Doña Valentina Mariano, while his maternal grandparents were Laureano Gomez and Estefania Jaro. This pedigree makes him a member of the prominent Sarino clan of Bacoor and the historically significant Gomez family, both Principalía families of the town during the Spanish colonial period.

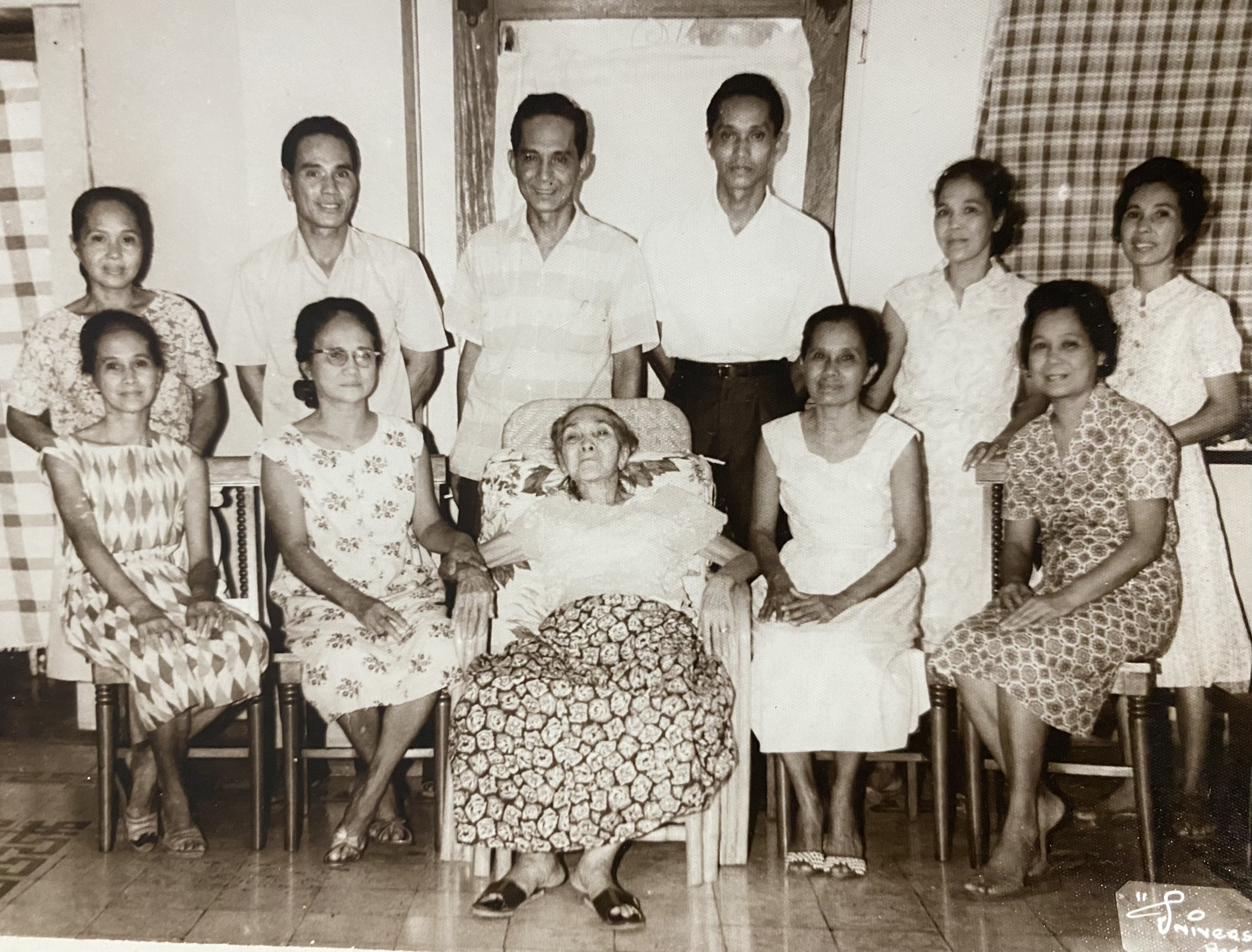
The Gomez-Sarino Family of Bacoor, Cavite with its matriarch, Dña. Francisca Jaro Gomez vda. de Sarino, in 1965

His mother, Francisca Jaro Gomez de Sarino, was the grand-niece of the martyr-priest Fr. Mariano Gómes de los Ángeles of the Gomburza. Her father, Laureano Gomez y Peredo, was the son of José Gómez, the younger brother of the priest who came with him to Bacoor in 1824, and his second wife, Gregoria Peredo. She was also the second cousin of the 1st Vice President of the Philippines, Gen. Mariano Trias.

His father, Pedro Mariano Sarino, was a former municipal councilor and one of the founding members of the Pintong Bato Masonic Lodge No. 51 in Bacoor. He served as the Worshipful Master of the lodge in 1924 and also served in government under the American Provincial Advisory Census Board for the municipality of Bacoor.

Mayor Sarino was the grand-nephew of the gobernadorcillo of Bacoor in 1890-1892, Don Epifanio Gómez, and the cousin of another former mayor of Bacoor during the early post-war period, Dr. Generoso Sarino, who served from 1946 to 1947.

He attended Torres High School for his secondary education and took up engineering in Mapua Institute of Technology. However, he was unable to finish his tertiary studies due to the death of their father Pedro in 1931. Sarino needed to engage in business to support his widowed mother and siblings.

== Public service ==
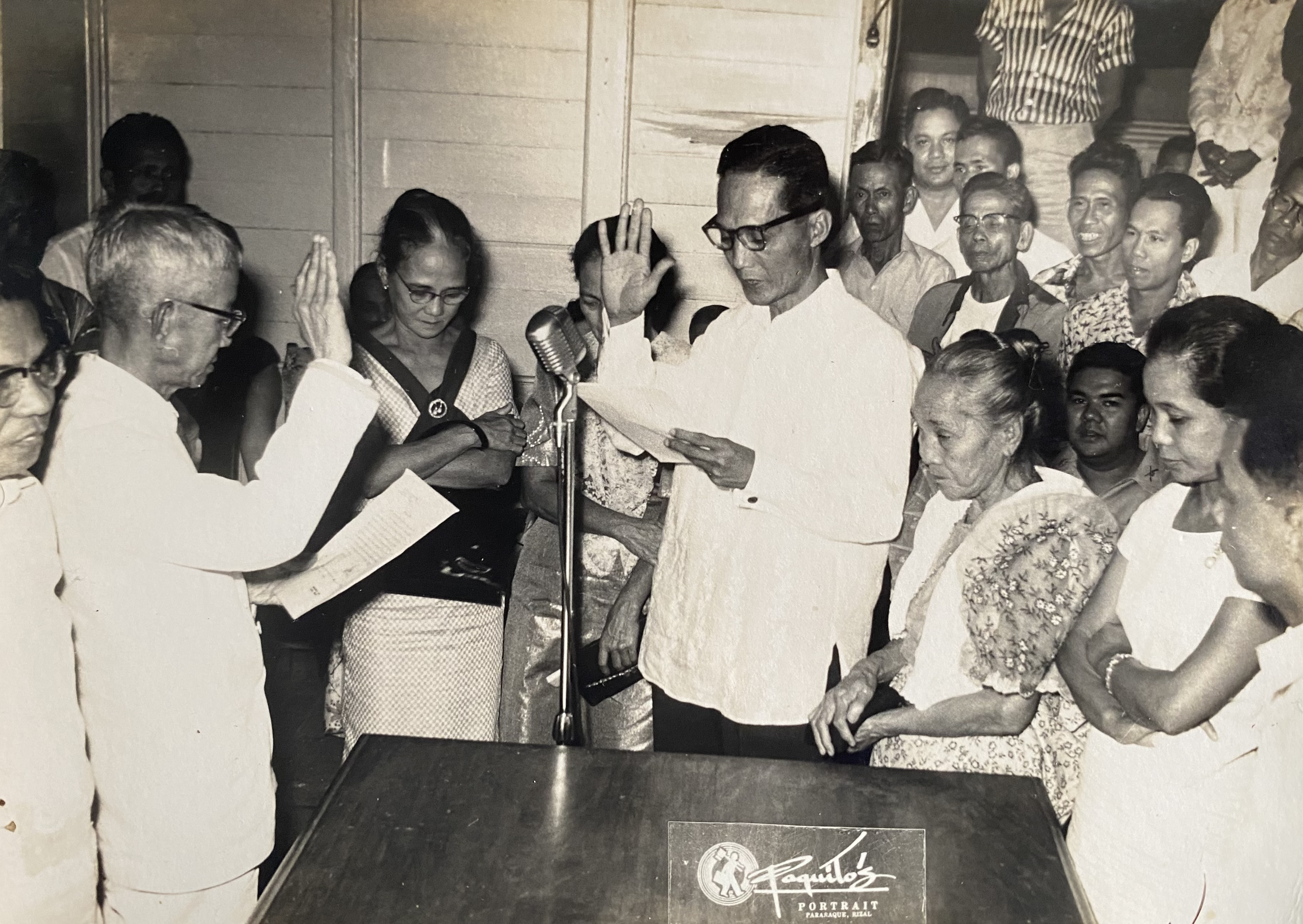
Inaugural oath taking ceremony of Mayor Sarino with his siblings and mother, Dña. Francisca

=== As a councilor ===
Sarino initially started his career in public service as a municipal councilor in the 1950s. Then-councilor Sarino was already affiliated with Congressman Justiniano Montano and his son, Delfin, during the term of Cavite governor Dominador Camerino. The governor once tried to hunt down known supporters of the Montanos (Montanistas) and had his men converge onto the Sarino ancestral house in Mabolo, Bacoor, Cavite. His men demanded to know Councilor Sarino's whereabouts from the Gomez-Sarino family. Fortunately, Sarino was able to escape by boat to Manila together with other Montanistas.

Councilor Sarino ran for both the 1951 and 1955 local elections, where he topped his second electoral campaign as councilor. This paved the way for his successful bid to become the chief executive of the municipality four years later.

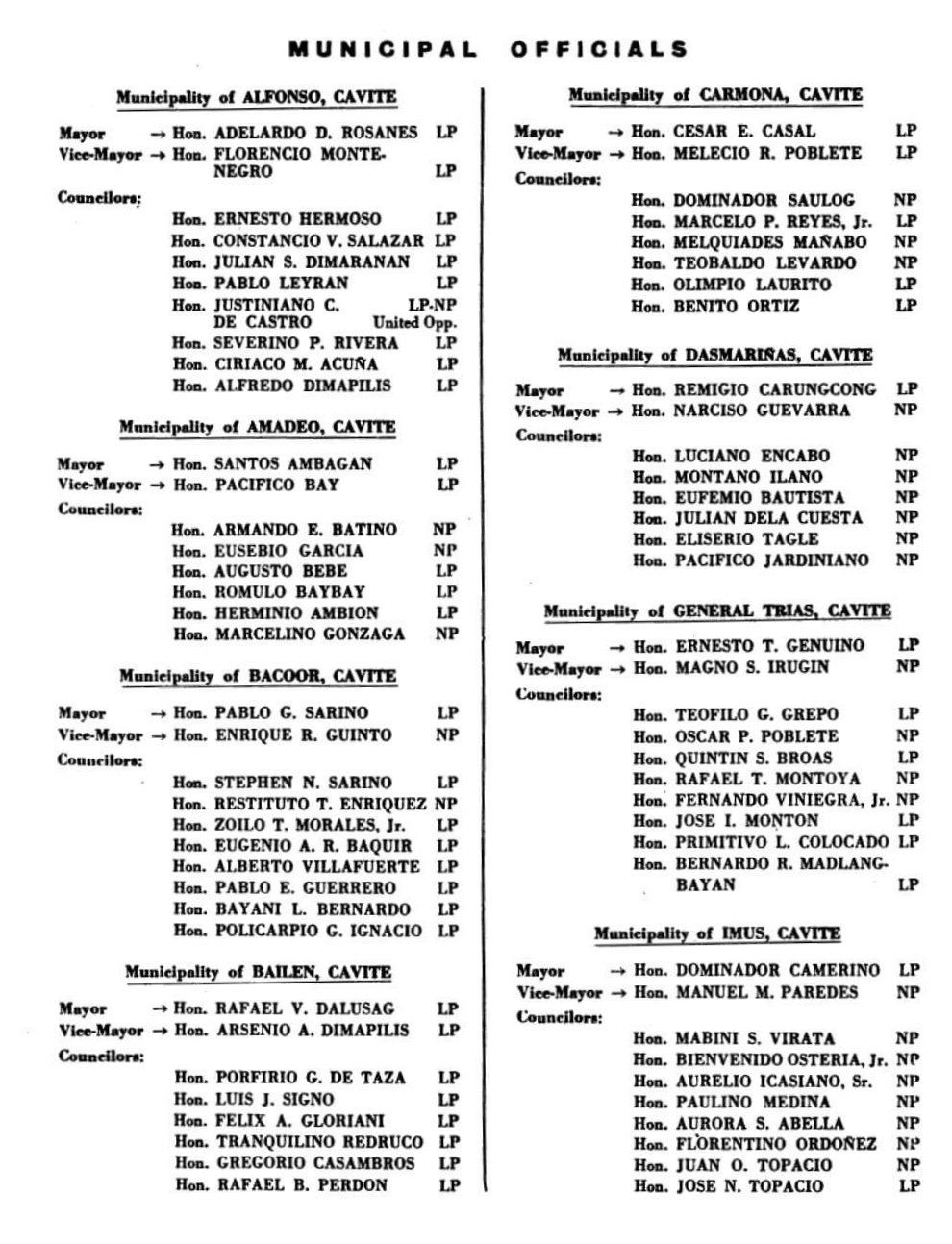
Mayor Sarino among the Municipal Officials of Cavite in the 1960's

=== As the municipal mayor ===
He was elected by the people of Bacoor as the municipal mayor in 1959. One of his main projects included the building of schools in the municipality and the improvement of roads. His term saw a period of economic development and security in the municipality.

Mayor Sarino was known to have been diligent with his work ethics, attending meetings in the morning and meeting his constituents in the afternoon til evening. A notable difference for him is the lack of security personnel even during election periods. At times when provided with men from the Philippine Constabulary, he was known to leave them behind. His preferred mode of transportation was to be driven simply by his brother, Vivencio G. Sarino, and he wielded no firearms except having a baton (batuta) kept in his trunk. He once explained to his nephew, Wilfredo Sarino, of the reason for such a setup: "Wala naman akong kaaway" (I don't have any enemies).

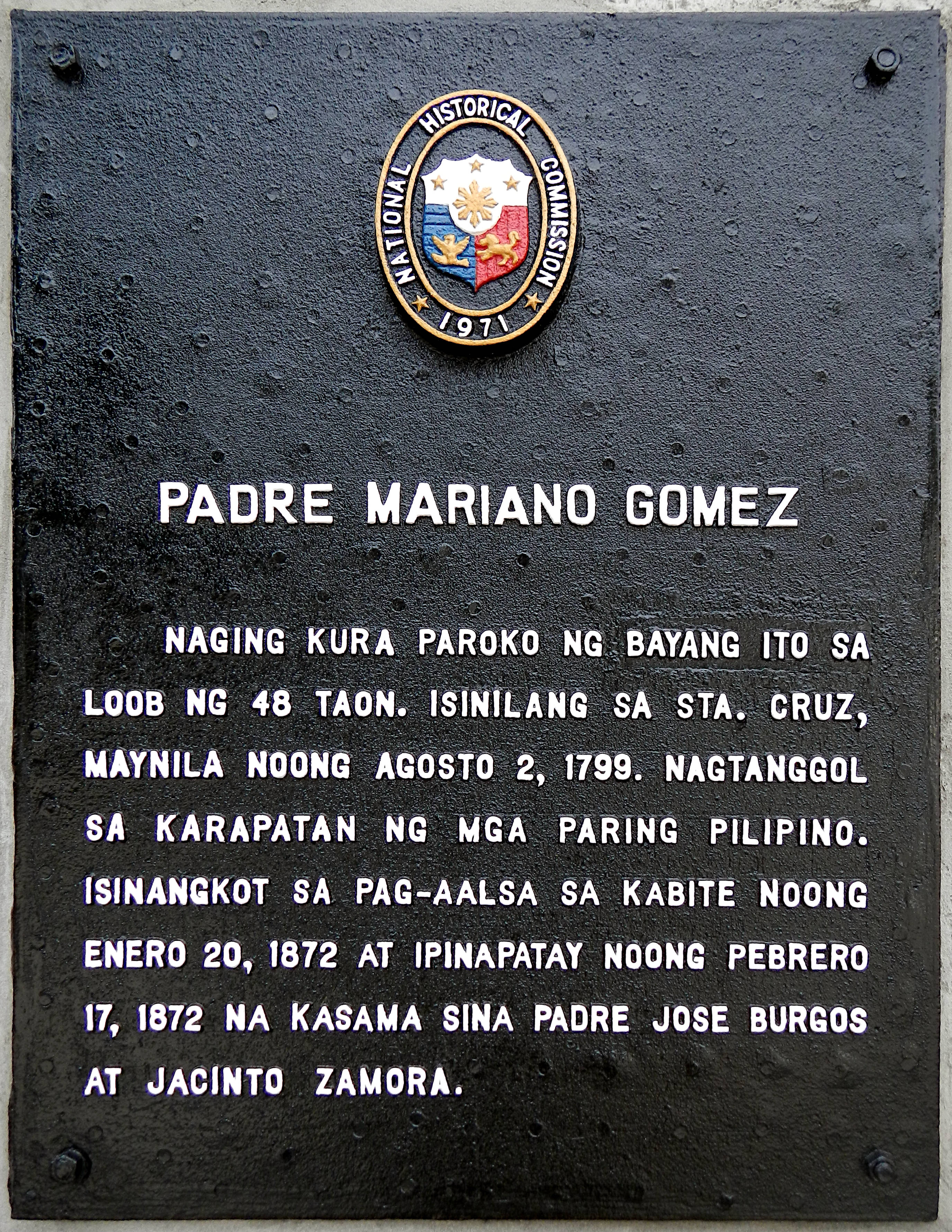
The 1972 historical marker presented to Mayor Sarino during the Gomburza Centennial commemoration

In 1972, as the municipal mayor, he led the celebration of the Gomburza Centennial in Bacoor, where his great-granduncle Fr. Gomes served as its parish priest. He also accepted on behalf of the municipal council the offer of the Gomburza Centennial Commission for a replica of the Gomburza Monument in Manila. However, this acceptance never materialized. As mayor, he also received the historical marker given by the National Historical Commission of the Philippines for Fr. Mariano Gomes which was installed in front of the church convent until 2021.

Under his term as mayor, the Bacoor Municipal High School (later, Bacoor National High School in 1983) was founded in 1972. This provided for public instruction of Bacoor's children. The campus of this school in the town proper would later be renamed in honor of his ancestor as the Mariano Gomes National High School. In addition, he oversaw the construction of a new municipal hall for Bacoor situated beside the church grounds (presently, the Bacoor Hall of Justice).

Even while serving during the presidency of Ferdinand Marcos, Mayor Sarino was widely known in Bacoor to be free of corruption leading to his success in reelections for successive terms as municipal mayor. His corruption-free stance was reflected on his personal policy in preventing even his closest relatives from hanging out in the municipal hall during his term. An anecdote from his funeral in 1987 detailed his sister, Teofista G. Sarino, being confused on the venue of the memorial service, mistaking the old municipal hall as the current one. Such was the detachment of his personal family from his political career.

In 1982, Mayor Sarino was one of the mayors who signed the document expressing support for Nelson Mandela in fighting against apartheid.

Mayor Sarino served until his removal after the EDSA People Power Revolution in 1986 as part of the nationwide transition to the Aquino Administration. His outstanding reputation as a public servant led the townspeople of Bacoor to question the sense of his dismissal.

== Personal life and death ==
Mayor Sarino married Pacita Legaspi in 1948 with his uncle and aunt, Higino and Antonina Sarino, as witnesses. He also had 9 siblings, including former NIA Auditor Brigido Gomez Sarino Sr. whose son, Brigido Sarino Jr., was his own godson.

On the personal level, Sarino was known to have been soft-spoken yet a fast speaker. He was not known to be a drinker, but he adopted a smoking habit after losing his father early in his life.

Mayor Pablo Gomez Sarino died on December 23, 1987, in Bacoor, Cavite, almost two years after ending his long career in public service. The cause of death was emphysema, due to smoking. His funeral was attended by many municipal officials and Bacooreños and was rendered full honors by the municipal police. He was laid to rest in the Familia Gomez-Sarino Mausoleum in the Maliksi Municipal Cemetery of Bacoor, Cavite together with his parents and siblings.

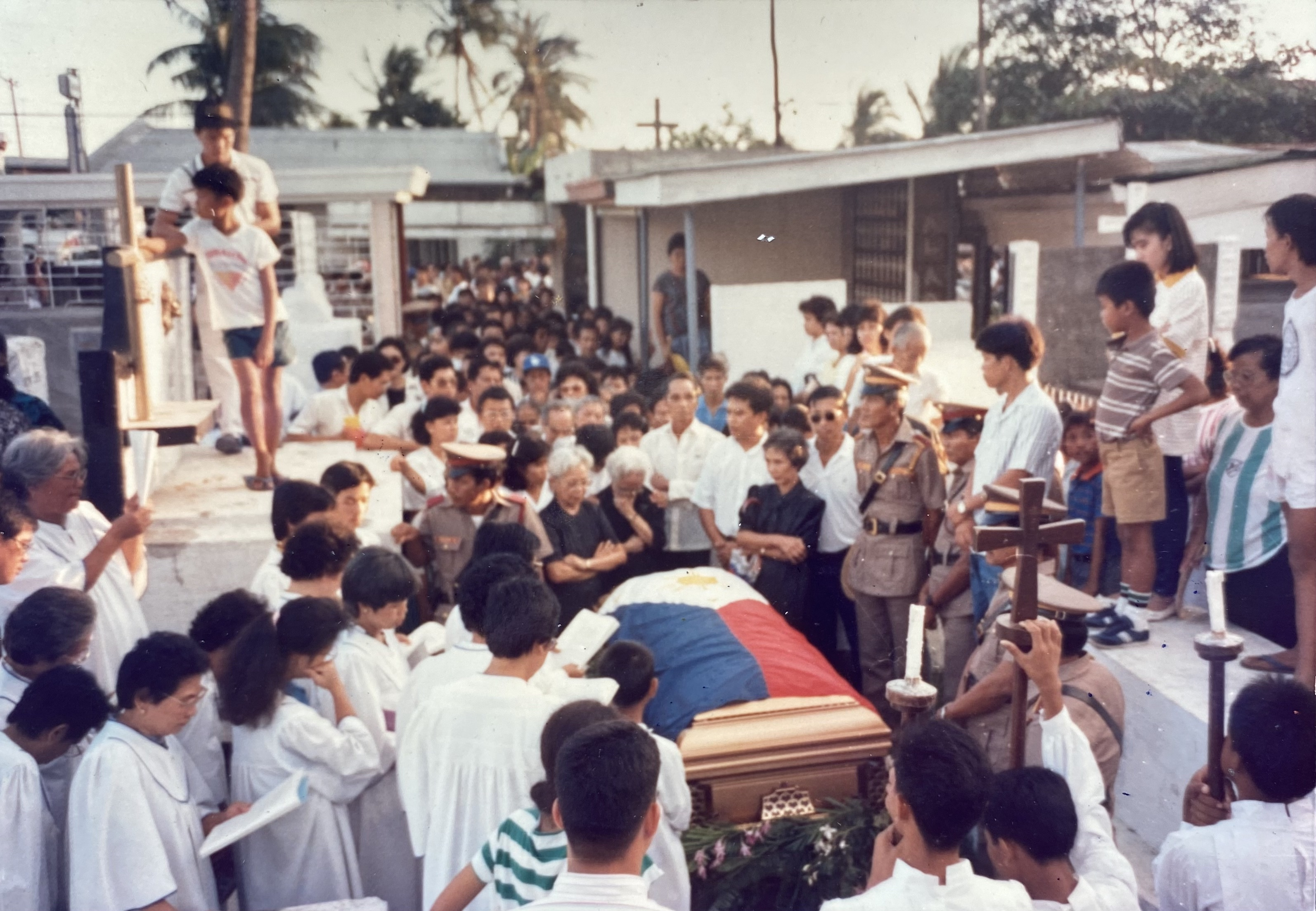
Funeral of Mayor Pablo G. Sarino in 1987 with full honors given by the townspeople, civil authorities, and the municipal police

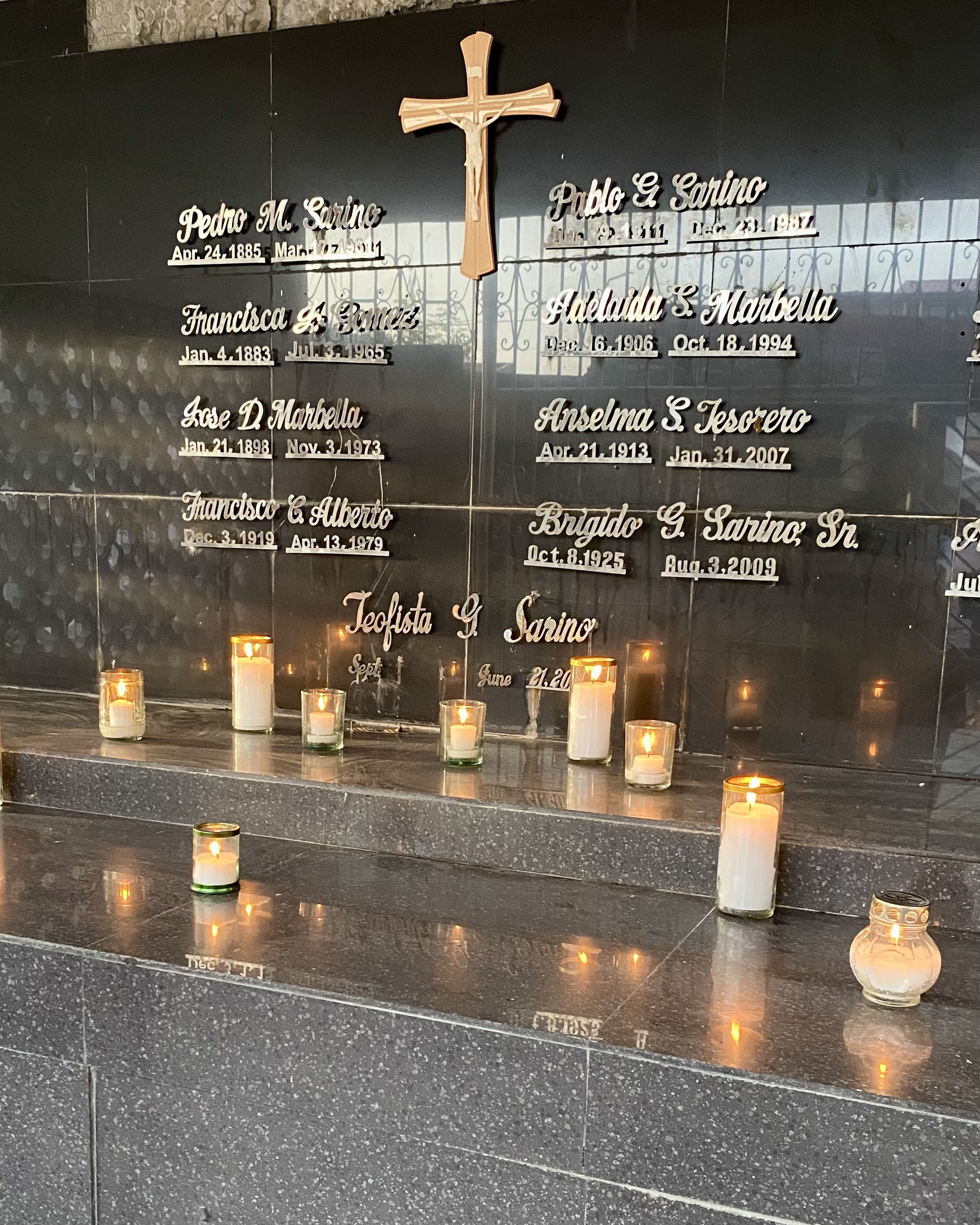
His final resting place in the Familia Gomez-Sarino Mausoleum in Bacoor, Cavite

Ancestry of Mayor Pablo Gomez Sarino

8. D. Antonio Sarino Cobarrúvia
4. D. Eugenio Sarino Cobarrúvia y Malinis
9. Dña. Manuela Malinis Mendoza
2. D. Pedro Sarino y Mariano
10. Simón Mariano
5. Dña. Valentina Mariano y Díaz
11. Silvéstra Díaz
1. Mayor Pablo G. Sarino
16. D. Alejándro Francísco Gómez
12. José Gómez y Custodio
17. Dña. Martina Custodio
6. Laureano Gómez y Peredo
13. Gregoria Peredo
3. Dña. Francisca Gómez y Jaro
14. Juan Jaro
7. Estefania Jaro y Baylon
15. Teodora Baylon
