= Lani Mercado =

Filipino actress and politician

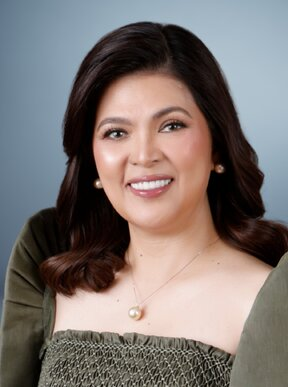
- Official portrait, 2026

Member of the Philippine House of Representatives from Cavite's 2nd district
- Incumbent
- Assumed office June 30, 2022
- Preceded by: Strike Revilla
- In office June 30, 2010 – June 30, 2016
- Preceded by: Elpidio Barzaga Jr.
- Succeeded by: Strike Revilla

20th Mayor of Bacoor
- In office June 30, 2016 – June 30, 2022
- Preceded by: Strike Revilla
- Succeeded by: Strike Revilla

Personal details
- Born: Jesusa Victoria Garcia Hernandez; April 13, 1968 (age 58) Quezon City, Philippines
- Party: Lakas (2009–2018; 2021–present); Magdalo (local party; 2009–present)
- Other political affiliations: PDP–Laban (2018–2021)
- Spouse: Bong Revilla (m. 1986)
- Children: 7, including Bryan and Jolo
- Occupation: Actress; television presenter; politician

Jesusa Victoria Garcia Hernandez-Bautista (born April 13, 1968), better known as Lani Mercado-Revilla (Tagalog pronunciation: [ˈlɐnɪ mɛɾˈkadɔ rɛˈbiljɐ]), is a Filipino actress and politician who has served as the representative of Cavite's second district since 2022, a position she previously held from 2010 to 2016.

== Personal life ==
She married actor and incumbent Senator Bong Revilla, in a civil wedding in 1986. They have seven children, namely:

- Leonard Bryan Bautista (born in November 1986)
- Jose Lorenzo Bautista III (Ramon "Jolo" Revilla III, born in March 1988), Representative of Cavite's 1st congressional district and Vice Governor of Cavite, married to Angelica Alita
- Inah Felicia Bautista-Del Rosario (born in October 1989) married to Vince del Rosario
- Maria Alexandra Bautista (1990-1991)
- Ma. Viktoria Gianna Bautista (born in August 1995) married to Jed Patricio
- Ma. Franzel Loudette Bautista (born in October 1997)
- Ramon Vicente "Ram" Bautista (born December 1998), 2nd district of Cavite Provincial Board Member, Cavite Vice Governor

== Filmography ==
=== Film ===
==== As actress ====
- Boystown (1981) – Beauty queen
- No Other Love (1982)
- Story of Three Loves (1982) – Sarah
- Summer Holiday (1983)
- Sumuko Ka Na, Ronquillo (1983)
- Indecent Exposure (1983)
- Boboy Tibayan (1983)
- Sa Ngalan ng Anak (1984)
- Give Me Five! (1984)
- Bukas Luluhod ang Mga Tala (1984)
- Daang Hari (1984)
- Mga Ibong Pipit (1984)
- Bigats (1984)
- Markang Rehas: Ikalawang Aklat (1985)
- Sa Dibdib ng Sierra Madre (1985)
- Celeste Gang: Hulihin si Mortemer 'Bitoy' Marcelo (1985)
- Mga Kwento ni Lola Basyang (1985) – Black Fairy
- Boboy Tibayan: Tigre ng Cavite (1985)
- I Can't Stop Loving You (1985) – Vina
- Super Wan-Tu-Tri (1986)
- Blusang Itim (1986) – Cleo
- The Graduates (1986)
- Anak ng Lupa (1987) – Miriam
- Once Upon a Time (1987)
- Stupid Cupid (1988) – Carmela
- Kung Maibabalik Ko Lang (1989) – Cecille
- APO: Kingpin ng Maynila (1990)
- My Other Woman (1990)
- Teen-age Mama (1993)
- Separada (1994) – Susan
- Walang Matigas Na Pulis sa Matinik Na Misis (1994) – Gloria
- Yes, Darling: Walang Matigas na Pulis... 2 (1997) – Gloria
- Flames of Love (2012)
- Mission Unstapabol: The Don Identity (2019) – Mrs. Mendez

==== As producer ====
- Alyas Pogi: Birador ng Nueva Ecija (1990)

=== Television ===
| Year | Title | Role |
|---|---|---|
| 1986–1989 | Germspesyal | Co-host |
| 1989–1990 | Eat Bulaga! | Co-host |
| 1990–1996 | GMA Supershow | Co-host |
| 1993–1996 | Lani's Home Ideas | Host |
| 1996–2001 | Better Home Ideas | Host |
| 2001 | Maalaala Mo Kaya: Ambu Bag | Judith |
| 2002 | Ang Iibigin ay Ikaw | Madonna Verder |
| 2003 | Ang Iibigin ay Ikaw Pa Rin | Madonna Verder |
| 2003–2004 | It Might Be You | Farrah / Nena |
| 2004–2005 | SCQ Reload | Tina Roxas |
| 2005 | Mars Ravelo's Darna | Nana Ising |
| 2005–2006 | Now and Forever: Agos | Olivia |
| 2005–2009 | Moms | Host |
| 2007 | Lupin | Cecilia Lupin |
| 2007–2008 | Marimar | Vanessa Mae Cruz |
| 2008–2009 | Sine Novela: Saan Darating ang Umaga? | Lorrie Rodrigo |
| 2009 | Zorro | Marcela dela Cruz |
| 2009 | All My Life | Marita Romualdez |
| 2009 | Sine Novela: Kaya Kong Abutin ang Langit | Naty Rosales |
| 2011 | Dwarfina | Andrea Valencia |
| 2011 | Amaya | Dallang |
| 2012 | Makapiling Kang Muli | Nelia Angeles |
| 2012 | Luna Blanca Book 3 | Rowena Sandoval |
| 2012–2013 | Paroa: Ang Kuwento ni Mariposa | Dalla |
| 2013 | Mga Basang Sisiw | Olivia Santos |
| 2014 | Magpakailanman: Sa Kamay ni Misis | Eugene's mother |
| 2014 | Magpakailanman: A Mother's Sacrifice | Rebecca's mother |
| 2014 | Strawberry Lane | Marissa Javier |
| 2019 | Magandang Buhay | Guest |

== Electoral history ==
Electoral history of Lani Mercado
| Year | Office | Party | | Votes received | | | | Result |
| Year | Office | Local | National | Total | % | P. | Swing | Result |
|---|---|---|---|---|---|---|---|---|
| 2010 | Representative (Cavite–2nd) | Magdalo | Lakas | 89,365 | 61.64% | 1st | —N/a | Won |
| 2013 | Representative (Cavite–2nd) | Magdalo | Lakas | —N/a | —N/a | 1st | —N/a | Won |
| 2022 | Representative (Cavite–2nd) | Magdalo | Lakas | 168,385 | 86.05% | 1st | —N/a | Won |
| 2025 | Representative (Cavite–2nd) | Magdalo | Lakas | 172,694 | 100.00% | 1st | —N/a | Unopposed |
| 2016 | Mayor of Bacoor | Magdalo | Lakas | 106,964 | 60.93% | 1st | —N/a | Won |
| 2019 | Mayor of Bacoor | Magdalo | PDP–Laban | 141,848 | —N/a | 1st | —N/a | Won |

House of Representatives of the Philippines
| Preceded by Elpidio Barzaga Jr. | Member of the House of Representatives from Cavite's 2nd District; 2010–2016 | Succeeded by Strike Revilla |
Political offices
| Preceded by Strike Revilla | Mayor of Bacoor; 2016–present | Incumbent |
