= Strike Revilla =

Filipino politician and businessman

The Honourable Strike Revilla
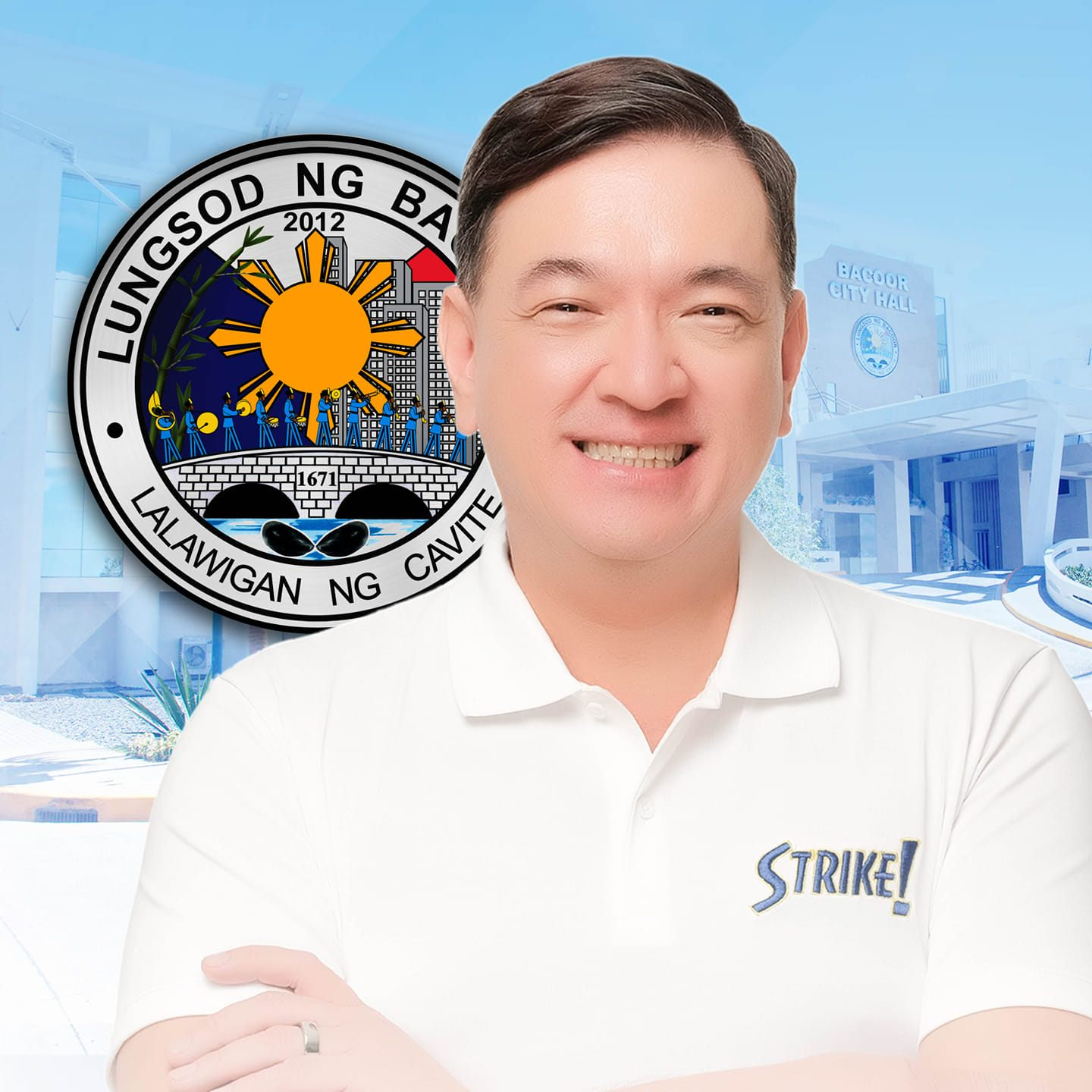
- Official portrait, 2022

Mayor of Bacoor
- Incumbent
- Assumed office June 30, 2022
- Preceded by: Lani Mercado
- In office June 30, 2007 – June 30, 2016
- Preceded by: Jessie B. Castillo
- Succeeded by: Lani Mercado

Deputy Speaker of the House of Representatives of the Philippines
- In office December 14, 2020 – June 30, 2022

Member of the Philippine House of Representatives from Cavite's 2nd district
- In office June 30, 2016 – June 30, 2022
- Preceded by: Lani Mercado
- Succeeded by: Lani Mercado

Member of the Cavite Provincial Board from the 1st district
- In office June 30, 1998 – June 30, 2004

Member of the Bacoor Municipal Council
- In office June 30, 1995 – June 30, 1998

Personal details
- Born: Edwin Mortel Bautista; March 2, 1970 (age 56) Santa Cruz, Manila, Philippines
- Party: Nacionalista (2021–present); Magdalo (local party; 2009–present)
- Other political affiliations: NUP (2018–2021); PDP–Laban (2016–2018); Lakas (until 2016)
- Relatives: Ramon Revilla, Sr. (father); Bong Revilla (brother)
- Education: Colegio de San Juan de Letran (BS, MBA)
- Occupation: Politician, businessman

Strike Bautista Revilla (Tagalog pronunciation: [rɛˈbiljɐ]; born Edwin Mortel Bautista; March 2, 1970) is a Filipino politician and businessman. He served as mayor of Bacoor since 2022, a position he previously held from 2007 to 2016. He served as representative of the 2nd District of Cavite in the House of Representatives of the Philippines from 2016 to 2022. He is a member of the Nacionalista Party and the local party Partido Magdalo. He was a member of the board of directors of the Philippine Charity Sweepstakes Office (PCSO) from August 2005 to March 2007.

== Background ==
Born as Edwin Mortel Bautista, he is the only child of Jose Acuña Bautista (Ramon Bautista Revilla, Sr.) and the fifth child of Azucena Guzman Mortel Bautista. He is the younger brother of incumbent Senator Ramon "Bong" Revilla Jr. He finished his elementary education at Jesus Good Shepherd School in 1983 and attended high school at San Dimas High School in Los Angeles County, California from 1983 to 1987. He finished Commerce major in Management at Colegio de San Juan de Letran in Manila, where he also got his master's degree in Business Administration.

Prior to entering politics, Revilla managed various family businesses, including the Angelus Eternal Garden memorial park, which has branches in Bacoor and Imus, Cavite.

== Political career ==
At 25, Revilla was first elected as councilor of Bacoor in 1995. In 1998, he was elected to the Sangguniang Panlalawigan of Cavite where he served for two terms until 2004. He was appointed by President Gloria Macapagal Arroyo to the board of directors of the PCSO in 2005.

House of Representatives of the Philippines
Preceded by Lani Mercado	Member of the House of Representatives from the 2nd District of Cavite; 2016–2022	Succeeded by Lani Mercado
Political offices
Preceded by Lani Mercado	Mayor of Bacoor; 2022–present	Incumbent
Preceded by Jessie B. Castillo	Mayor of Bacoor; 2007–2016	Succeeded by Lani Mercado
