= City of Bacoor Government Center =

City hall complex in Cavite, Philippines

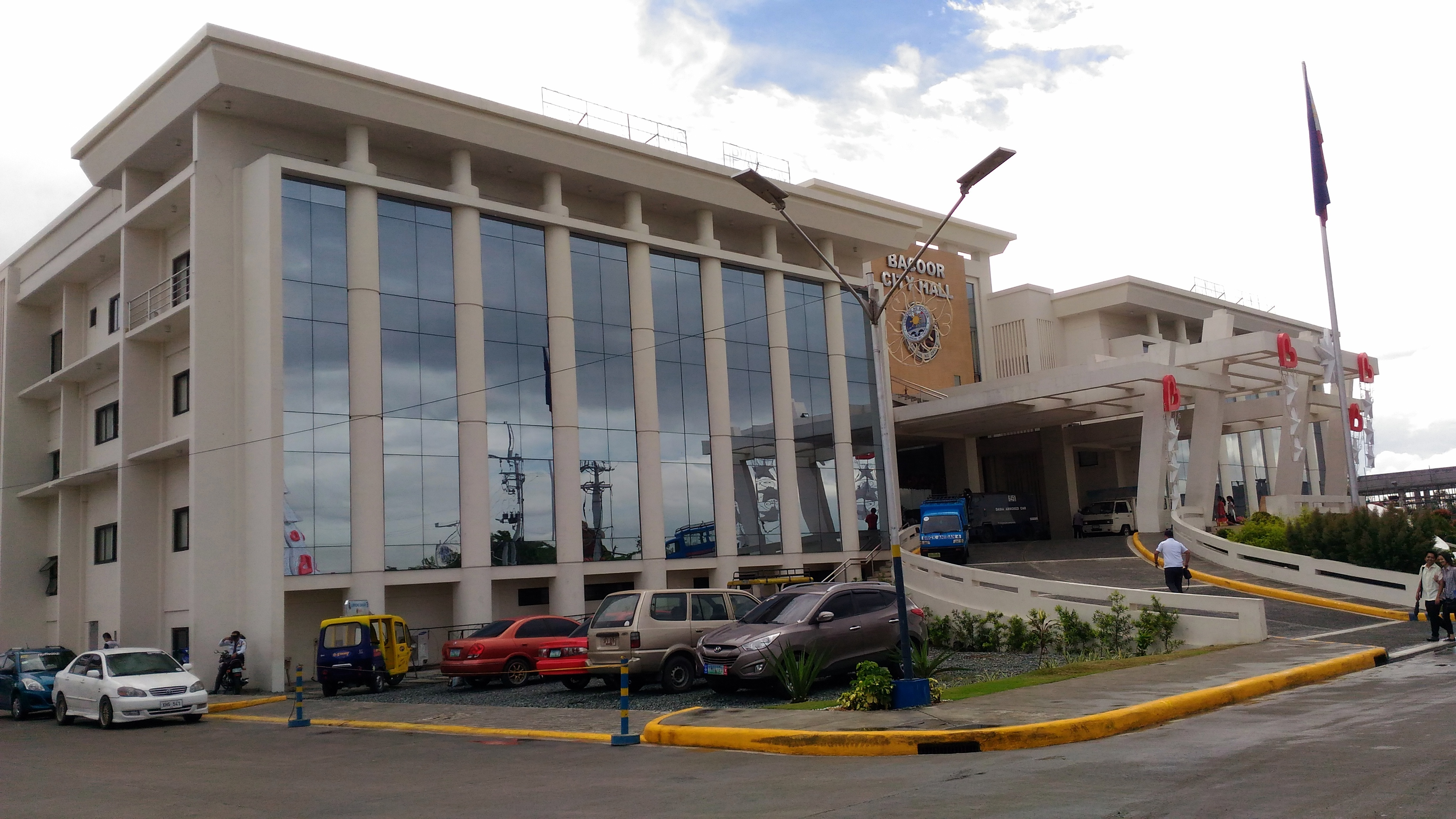
- The City of Bacoor Hall, housed within the CBGC complex.
- Interactive map of the City of Bacoor Government Center area

General information
- Status: Completed
- Type: Government complex
- Location: Bacoor Boulevard, Bayanan, Bacoor, Cavite
- Coordinates: 14°25′52.06″N 120°58′5.52″E
- Construction started: March 2, 2012
- Opening: September 29, 2015
- Cost: ₱497 million
- Owner: City Government of Bacoor
- Management: City Government of Bacoor

Technical details
- Floor count: 3
- Floor area: 11,200 square feet (1,040 m^{2})

The City of Bacoor Government Center, formerly Bacoor Government Center or Bacoor City Government Center, is a complex that serves as the seat of government of Bacoor, Cavite, Philippines. It is where its city hall is located.

== History ==
The city government of Bacoor was previously housed at the old Municipal Hall of Bacoor in Barangay Tabing Dagat which could no longer accommodate needs of the local government units.

On March 2, 2012, the groundbreaking for a new government center was made. The government facility which has a 11,200 square metres (121,000 sq ft) of floor area, was built on a 2 hectares (4.9 acres) lot donated by Senator Manny Villar and Narcimiano Gawaran of the Addas Development Corporation. The three storey building was also built as a green building and completion of the building was scheduled to 2013, at the time of the groundbreaking.

The city hall building, housed within the Bacoor Government Center complex, was inaugurated on September 29, 2015, in line with the city's 344th founding anniversary celebration led by then Mayor Strike B. Revilla (who also became representative of Cavite's 2nd congressional district and retook his old post in 2022). The compound also houses other government offices such as the satellite branches of the National Bureau of Investigation, Department of Trade and Industry, Philippine Statistics Authority, Housing and Land Use Regulatory Board and Overseas Workers Welfare Administration.

Upon reassuming the mayorship in 2022, Revilla renamed the complex as City of Bacoor Government Center (CBGC) to avert confusion as the acronym BGC for its seat of government is often mistaken to the more popular BGC, Bonifacio Global City in Taguig.

The complex also houses the buildings of the City Health Office and national government agencies. A mostly basketball gymnasium named after Strike Revilla is located within the compound which served as the homecourt of Maharlika Pilipinas Basketball League team the Bacoor City Strikers, as well as the city's command center for fire, police, and traffic. Service and business centers of Meralco, PLDT and Bayad Center and kiosks from Smart and Sun and some food outlets (carinderias) are also located there.

== See also ==
- Bacoor
