= Mayor of Bacoor =

Local chief executive of Bacoor, Philippines

Mayor of the City of Bacoor
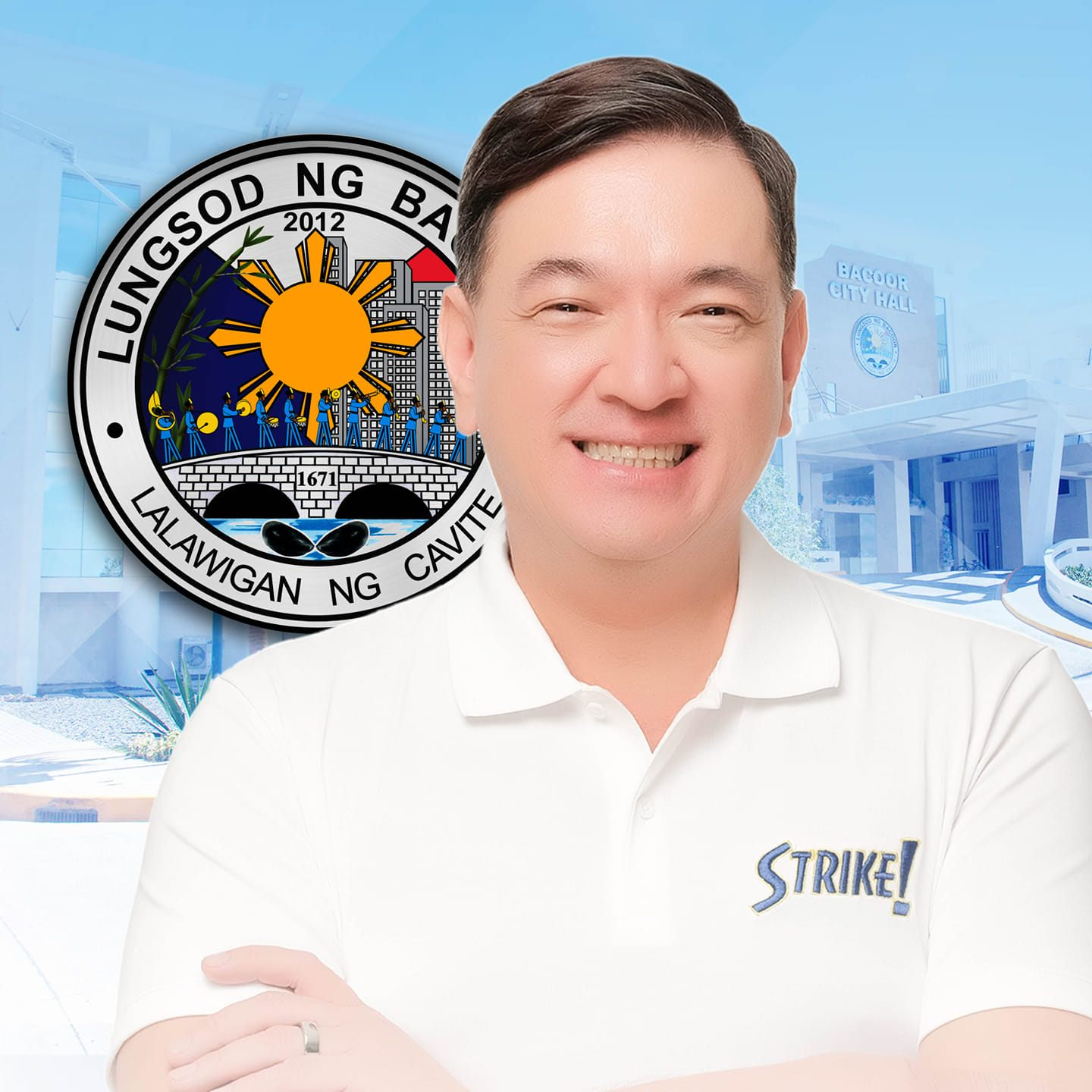
- Incumbent; Edwin M. Bautista since June 30, 2022
- Style: The Honorable (Formal)
- Appointer: Elected via popular vote
- Term length: 3 years
- Precursor: Gobernadorcillo de Bacoor (pre-Maura Law); Capitán municipal de Bacoor (post-Maura Law)
- Inaugural holder: Mateo Masacayan (as gobernadorcillo)
- Formation: 1671

The mayor of Bacoor (Filipino: Punong Lungsod ng Bakoor) is the head of the executive branch of city government of Bacoor, a first-class urban component city in the province of Cavite, Philippines. Like all local government heads in the Philippines, the mayor is elected via popular vote, and may not be elected for a fourth consecutive term (although the former mayor may return to office after an interval of one term). In case of death, resignation or incapacity, the vice mayor becomes the mayor. The present office was established in 1908 during the American colonial period after the reconstitution of Bacoor in 1906 from Imus, succeeding the Spanish-era offices of the gobernadorcillo and capitán municipal of Bacoor. Twenty-one individuals have held this position since its formation.

== History ==
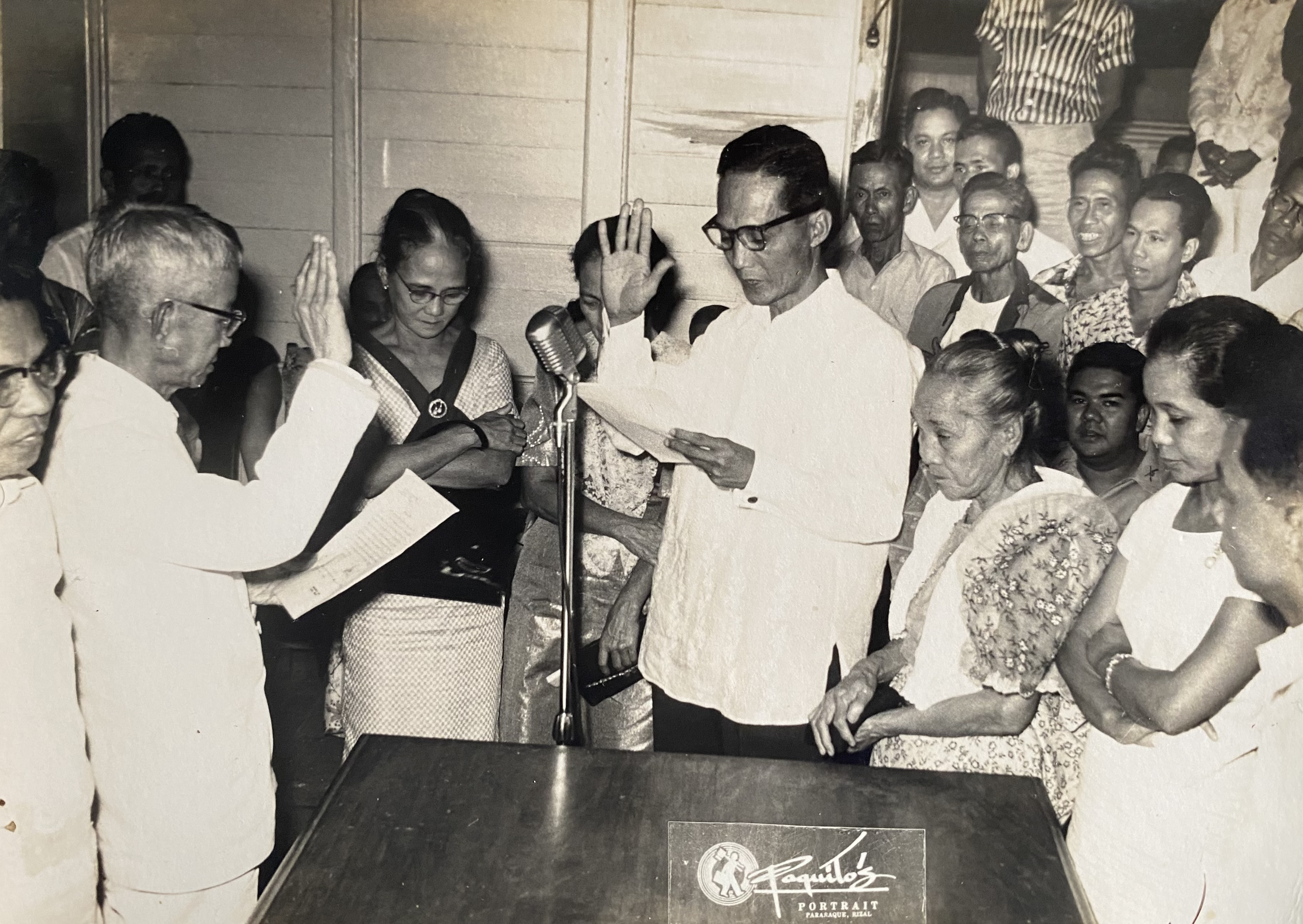
Inaugural oath taking ceremony of Hon. Pablo Gomez Sarino as mayor of Bacoor in 1959

During the Spanish era, the municipal head of Bacoor was named gobernadorcillo de Bacoor who was chosen by the upper class Principalia among themselves. Similar to other towns in the Philippines, it required literacy and mastery of the Castilian language. An election by the Principalia produces a list of top three candidates for the position known as the terna. This list was then submitted to the Governor General of the Philippines for his choice of appointment, giving a term of 2 years. The appointed gobernadorcillo was announced on the major newspapers, indicating also their ranking in the terna. An example of this was the gobernadorcillo de Bacoor for 1890-1892, Don Epifanio Gómez, who was appointed by Governor General Valeriano Weyler on May 8, 1890, ranking first in the terna. Gómez was the nephew of the martyred parish priest of Bacoor, Don Mariano Gómes de los Ángeles. After the Maura Law of 1895, the title changed from gobernadorcillo to capitan municipal until the end of the Spanish period. During the American occupation of the Philippines, the position became an appointed presidente municipal. The first election for the present office occurred only after the reconstitution of Bacoor as separate from Imus in 1908, resulting in election of Hon. Luis Landas.

The position of municipal mayor of Bacoor continued from the American period, the Japanese occupation, and the post-independence era. The longest term in office is presently held by Hon. Pablo Gomez Sarino who was municipal mayor of Bacoor from 1959-1967 and 1971-1986, serving for a total of 23 years. He was also the grand-nephew of the previous gobernadorcillo, Epifanio Gómez. The municipal position would be retained until the establishment of Bacoor as a component city in 2012.

Pursuant to Chapter II, Title II, Book III of Republic Act No. 7160 or the Local Government Code of 1991, the Bacoor city government is to be composed of a mayor (alkalde), a vice-mayor (bise alkalde) and members (kagawad) of the legislative branch Sangguniang Panlungsod alongside a secretary to the said legislature, all of which are elected to a three-year term and are eligible to run for three consecutive terms.

Elected to a term of three years and limited to three consecutive terms, the mayor of Bacoor holds office at Bacoor City Hall within the Bacoor Government Center in Brgy. San Nicolas II. He appoints the directors of each city department, which include the office of administration, engineering office, information office, legal office, and treasury office.

The first city mayor of Bacoor is Edwin M. Bautista, from the Lakas Party. He first assumed office on 30 June 2007, following his victory in the May 2007 municipal elections. He was reelected in 2010 for a second term, during which, Bacoor was converted into a city. He ran and won a third as city mayor in 2013 which expired in 2016. Having served up to the constitutional limit of three terms, he ran and won as the city's representative in the Philippine House of Representatives, with his sister-in-law Lani Mercado-Revilla being elected as city mayor as his replacement. After Revilla served for two terms, she was reelected to the House of Representatives during the 2022 Philippine general election, with Bautista returning to city hall as the reelected mayor.

The city's vice mayor performs duties as acting governor in the absence of the mayor. The vice mayor also automatically succeeds as mayor upon the death of the incumbent and also convenes the Sangguniang Panlungsod, the city's legislative body. The city's first vice mayor was Rosette Miranda-Fernando, who was Bautista's vice mayor from 2007 to 2013. Councilwoman Catherine Evaristo replaced Fernando in that role having won during the 2013 Philippine general election and served in the role during the Bautista and Revilla administrations until she decided to run again as councilwoman in the 2022 Philippine general election, having reached the constitutional three-term limit. The incumbent vice mayor of Bacoor is Rowena B. Mendiola, who is also a former city councilwoman and Bautista's sister.

== List of mayors ==
-Partial list of gobernadorcillos, capitanes municipales, and mayors of Bacoor

| # | Image | Name | Period |
Gobernadorcillo under Spanish rule
| 1 | | Julian de Ocampo | 1889-1890 |
| 2 | | Epifanio Gómez | 1890-1892 |
| 3 | | Benigno De Guia | 1892-1893 |
Capitán municipal under Spanish rule
| (3) | | Benigno De Guia | 1893-1894 |
| 4 | | Justo Narvaez | 1894-1896 |
During Philippine Revolution
| (4) | | Justo Narvaez (retained by Spain due to the Revolution) | 1896-1898 |
Under American colonial rule
| 5 | | Gregorio De Guia (Presidente municipal) | 1900–1903 |
| 6 | | Felix Cuenca (Presidente municipal) | 1903–1906 |
| 7 | | Luis Javier Landas | 1908–1911 |
| (5) | | Gregorio De Guia | 1912–1915 |
| 8 | | Hilarion Guzman | 1916–1919 |
| 9 | | Simon Reyes | 1919–1922 |
| 10 | | Francisco Gaudier | 1925–1928 |
| 11 | | Marcelo F. Cuenca | 1928–1930 |
| 12 | | Eduardo Ocampo | 1931–1934 |
Second World War
| 13 | | Marcelo Miranda | 1942–1945 |
Post-Independence Era
| 14 | | Dr. Generoso Sarino | 1946–1947 |
| 15 | | Arsenio Castillo | 1948–1954 |
| 16 | | Benigno Guinto | 1954–1959 |
| 17 | | Pablo Gomez Sarino | 1959–1967 |
| (16) | | Benigno Guinto | 1967–1971 |
| (17) | | Pablo Gomez Sarino | 1971–1986 |
| 18 | | Benjamin T. Enriquez, Sr. (OIC) | 1986-1987 |
| 19 | | Evelyn S. Maniquis | 1987-1988 |
| 20 | | Angelito J. Miranda | 1988 (Note: Assassinated a few days later.) |
| – | | Buencamino M. Cruz | 1988–1992 |
| 21 | | Victor I. Miranda | 1992–1996 |
| 22 | | Jose M. Francisco | 1996–1998 |
| 23 | | Jessie Banayad Castillo | 1998–2007 |
| 24 | | Strike Revilla | 2007–2016 |
| 25 | | Lani M. Revilla | 2016–2022 |
| (24) | | Strike Revilla | 2022–present |

== See also ==
- Bacoor
