= Bakalia Government College =

Public higher secondary school in Chittagong, Bangladesh

Bakalia Govt. College, Chattogram
- বাকলিয়া সরকারি কলেজ, চট্টগ্রাম
- Former name: Chittagong Government Commercial Institute (1966–2016)
- Motto: শিক্ষাই প্রগতি
- Motto in English: Education is progress
- Type: Public
- Established: 1966; 60 years ago
- Affiliations: Bangladesh Technical Education Board (1966 - 1984); Dhaka Education Board (1984 - 2016); Chittagong Education Board (2016 - present)
- Principal: Professor Rehena Akhter Yeasmeen
- Academic staff: 25
- Students: 2,737 (As of 2022)
- Location: Shah Amanat Bridge Connecting Road, Bakalia, Chittagong, 4203, Bangladesh; 22.3587°N 91.8531°E
- EIIN: 134595
- Website: bgcc.edu.bd

Bakalia Government College (officially Bakalia Govt. College, Chattogram and formerly the Chittagong Government Commercial Institute) is a public higher secondary school located in Chittagong, Bangladesh. It was established as a technical institute in 1966. In 2016, it was converted into a higher secondary school.

== History ==
According to the instructions of the National Education Commission of 1959, the then government of East Pakistan district headquarters decided to set up commercial institutes and consequently with the financial and technical support of USAID in Dhaka, Mymensingh, Faridpur, Chittagong, Feni, Comilla, Khulna, Jessore, Kushtia, Rajshahi, Dinajpur, and Rangpur. These commercial institutes were established in Bogra, Pabna, Barisal and Sylhet district cities between 1965 and 1967. The Chittagong Government Commercial Institute was established in 1966 in Bakalia in Chittagong. Later, the government of Bangladesh opened all commercial institutes and provided teaching opportunities in all subjects. In that context, in May 2016, Chittagong Government Commercial Institute was converted into Bakalia Government College, Chittagong.
