= Ternate–Nasugbu Road =

Road in the Philippine provinces of Cavite and Batangas

Ternate–Nasugbu Road
- Ternate–Nasugbu Highway; Nasugbu–Ternate Highway
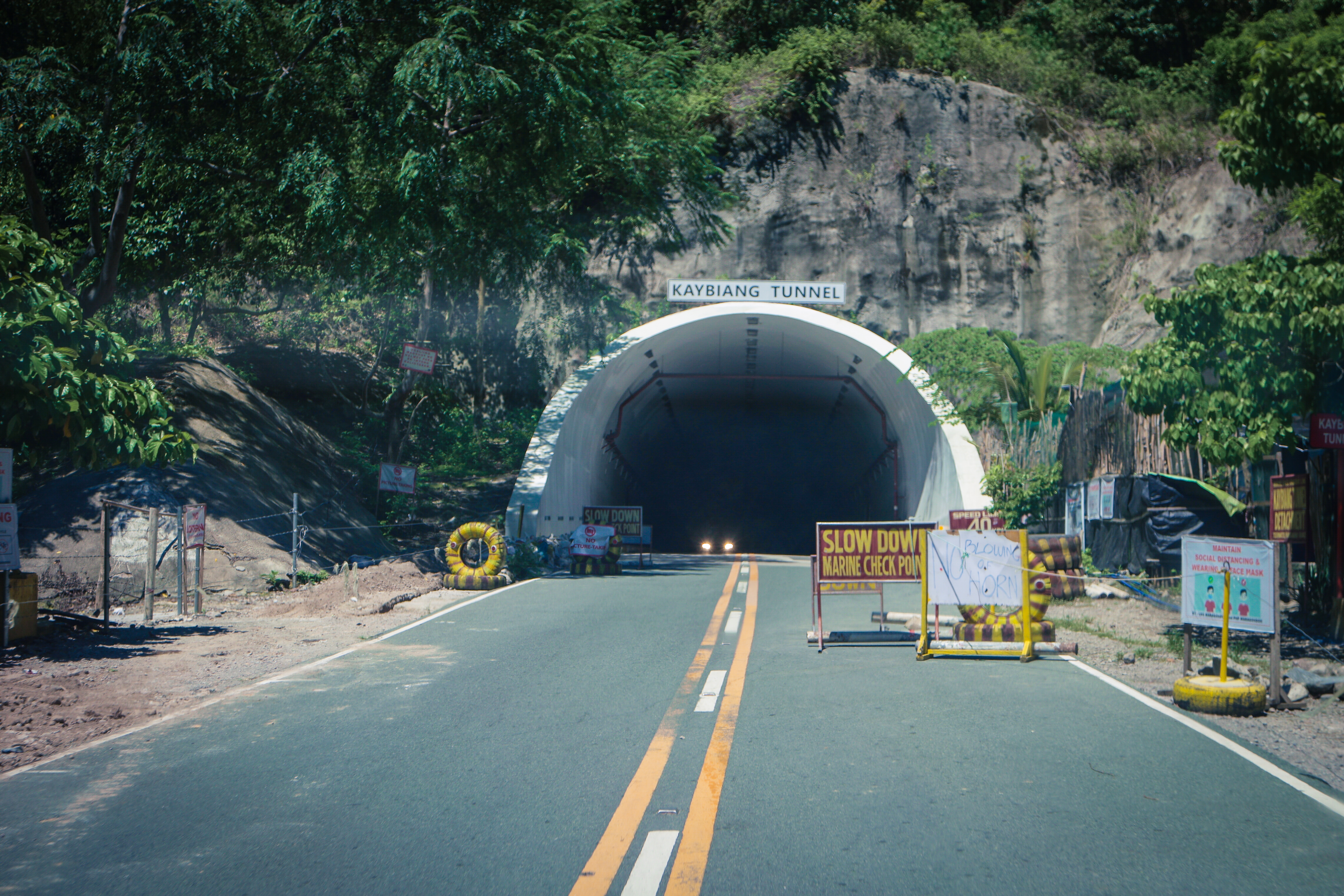
- The Kaybiang Tunnel in Maragondon

Route information
- Maintained by Department of Public Works and Highways (DPWH) - Cavite 2nd District Engineering Office and Batangas 1st District Engineering Office
- Length: 30.229 km (18.783 mi)
- Component highways: N407

Major junctions
- North end: N405 (Governor's Drive / Caylabne Road) in Ternate, Cavite
- South end: N407 (Tagaytay–Nasugbu Highway) in Nasugbu, Batangas

Location
- Country: Philippines
- Provinces: Cavite and Batangas
- Towns: Ternate, Maragondon, and Nasugbu

Highway system
- Roads in the Philippines; Highways; Expressways; List

The Ternate–Nasugbu Road, also known as Ternate–Nasugbu Highway or Nasugbu–Ternate Highway, is a two-to-four lane, secondary road in the provinces of Cavite and Batangas, Philippines. It connects the municipality of Ternate in Cavite to the municipality of Nasugbu in Batangas.

The road forms part of National Route 407 (N407) of the Philippine highway network.

== Route description ==
From the south, the road starts at the intersection with Tagaytay–Nasugbu Road (J.P. Laurel Street) and the access road to Coast Guard Sub-Station Nasugbu in Nasugbu. Running parallel to the western coast of Batangas and Cavite, it turns north at its intersection with Looc Road before traversing the Mounts Palay-Palay–Mataas-na-Gulod Protected Landscape, where it enters the province of Cavite at Maragondon. The road ends at its intersection with Caylabne Road in Ternate and continues towards the town proper as Governor's Drive.

== History ==
The road from Barangay Wawa was extended towards Ternate through a project conceived in 1994 during the administration of President Fidel V. Ramos. However, the construction was delayed due to right-of-way issues, with the groundbreaking held in 2009 during the administration of President Gloria Macapagal Arroyo and completed in 2013 during the administration of her successor President Benigno Aquino III. The project includes a 4-kilometer (2.5 mi) paved road, a 1.4-kilometer (0.87 mi) concrete road, four new bridges, and the 300-meter (980 ft) Kaybiang Tunnel.

== Intersections ==
Intersections are numbered by kilometer posts, with Rizal Park in Manila designated as kilometer zero.

Province	City/Municipality	km	mi	Destinations	Notes
Cavite	Ternate	67.000	41.632	N405 (Governor's Drive / Caylabne Road)	Northern terminus
Cavite	Maragondon	70.107	43.562	Kaybiang Tunnel	
Cavite	Maragondon	72.062	44.777	Patungan Bridge	
Cavite	Maragondon	74.551	46.324	Tabe Bridge	
Cavite–Batangas boundary	Maragondon–Nasugbu boundary	74.622	46.368	Cavite 2nd District Engineering Office–Batangas 1st District Engineering Office highway boundary	
Batangas	Nasugbu	103.65	64.41	N407 (Tagaytay–Nasugbu Highway)	Unsignalled intersection. Western terminus.
1.000 mi = 1.609 km; 1.000 km = 0.621 mi
