= Trece Martires =

Component city and seat of government of Cavite, Philippines

- Component city
- City of Trece Martires
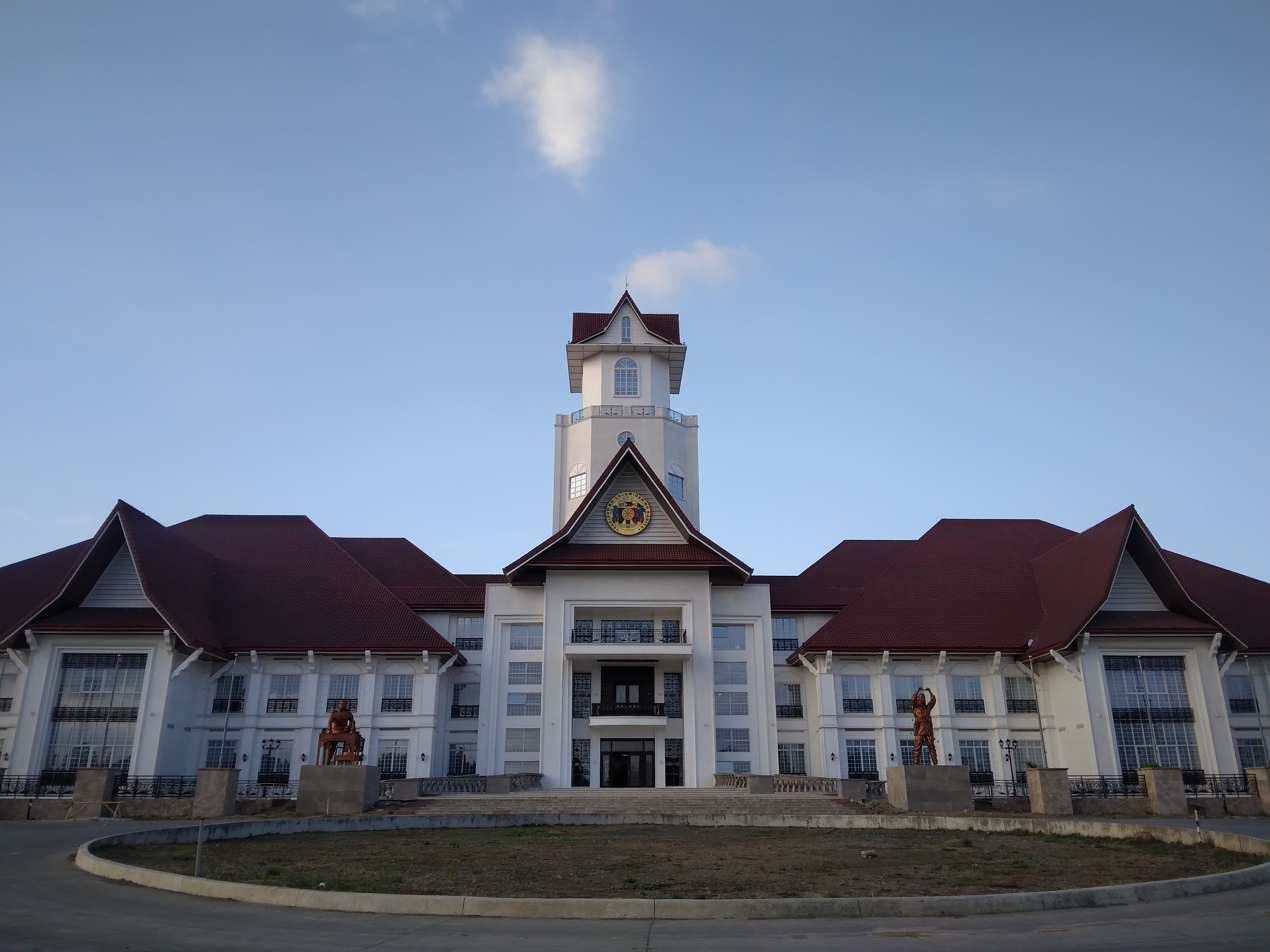
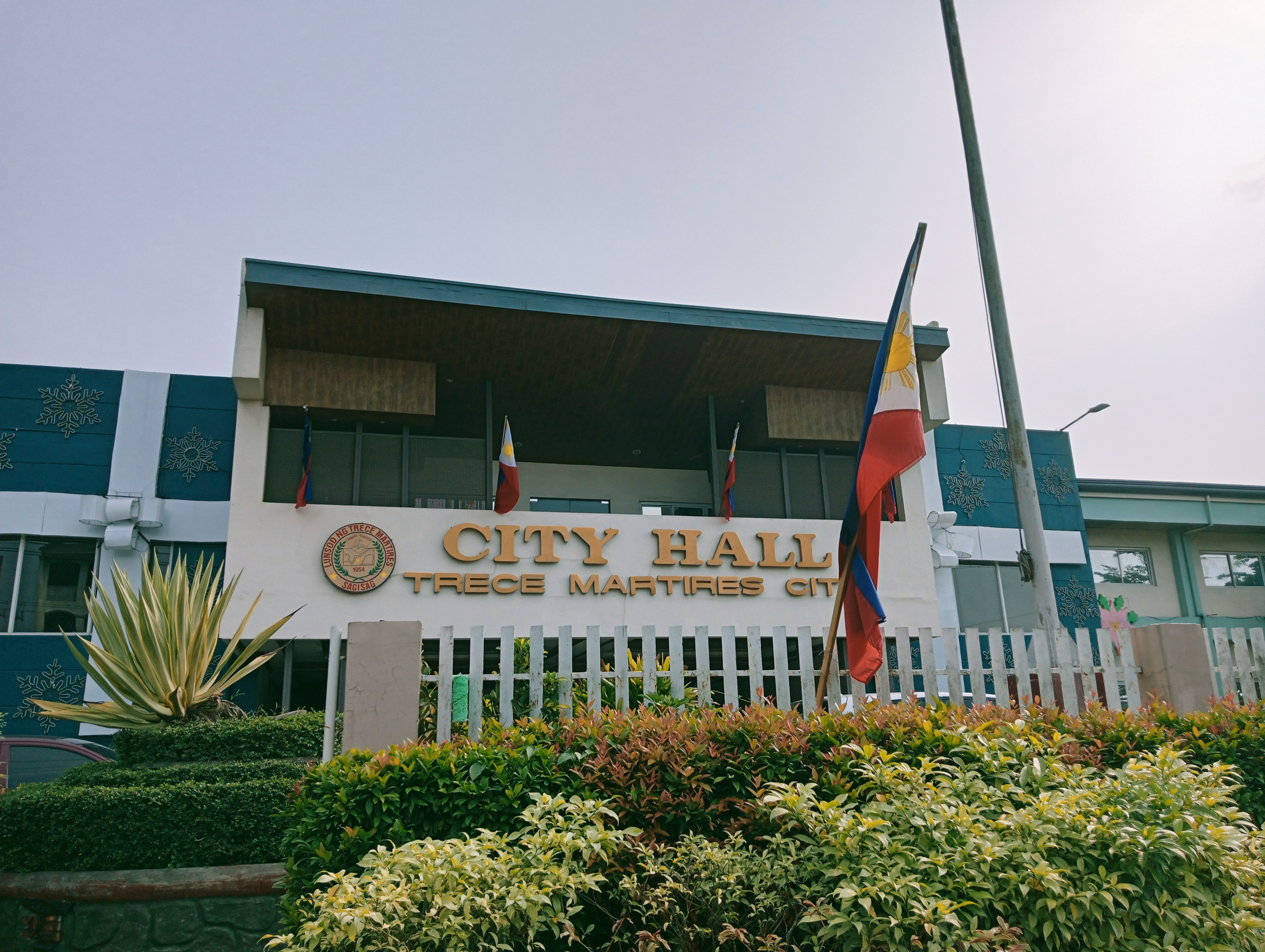
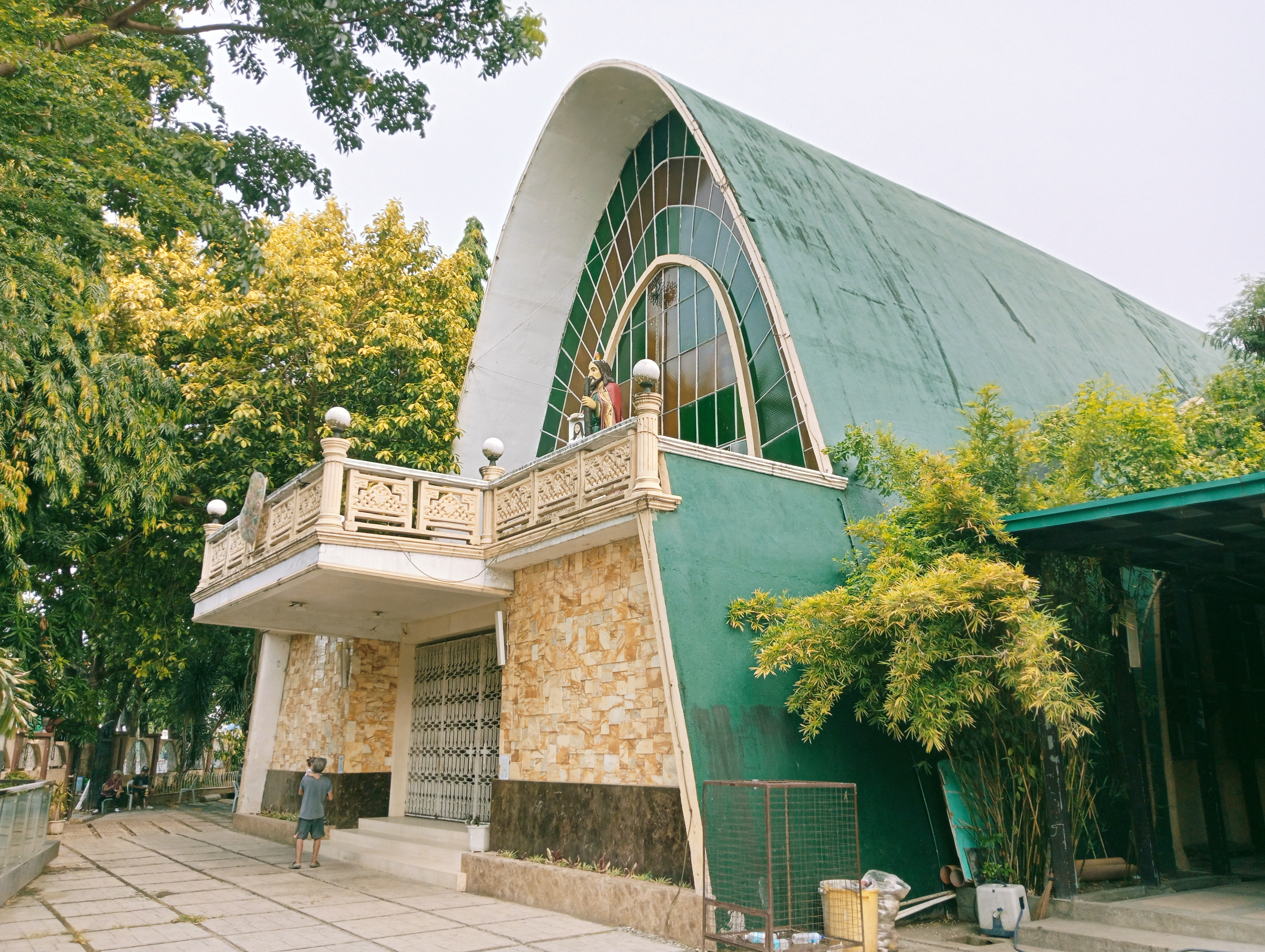
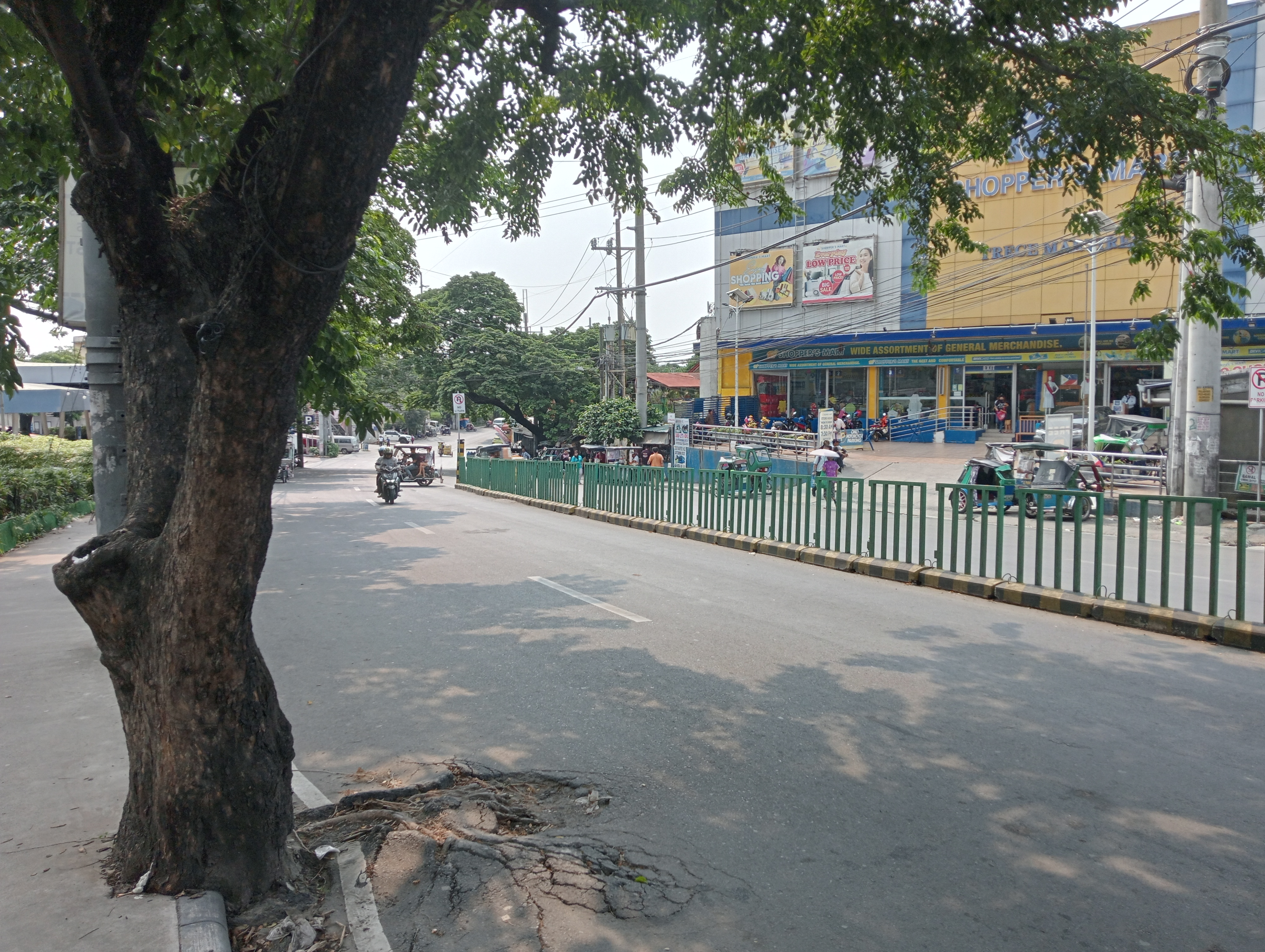
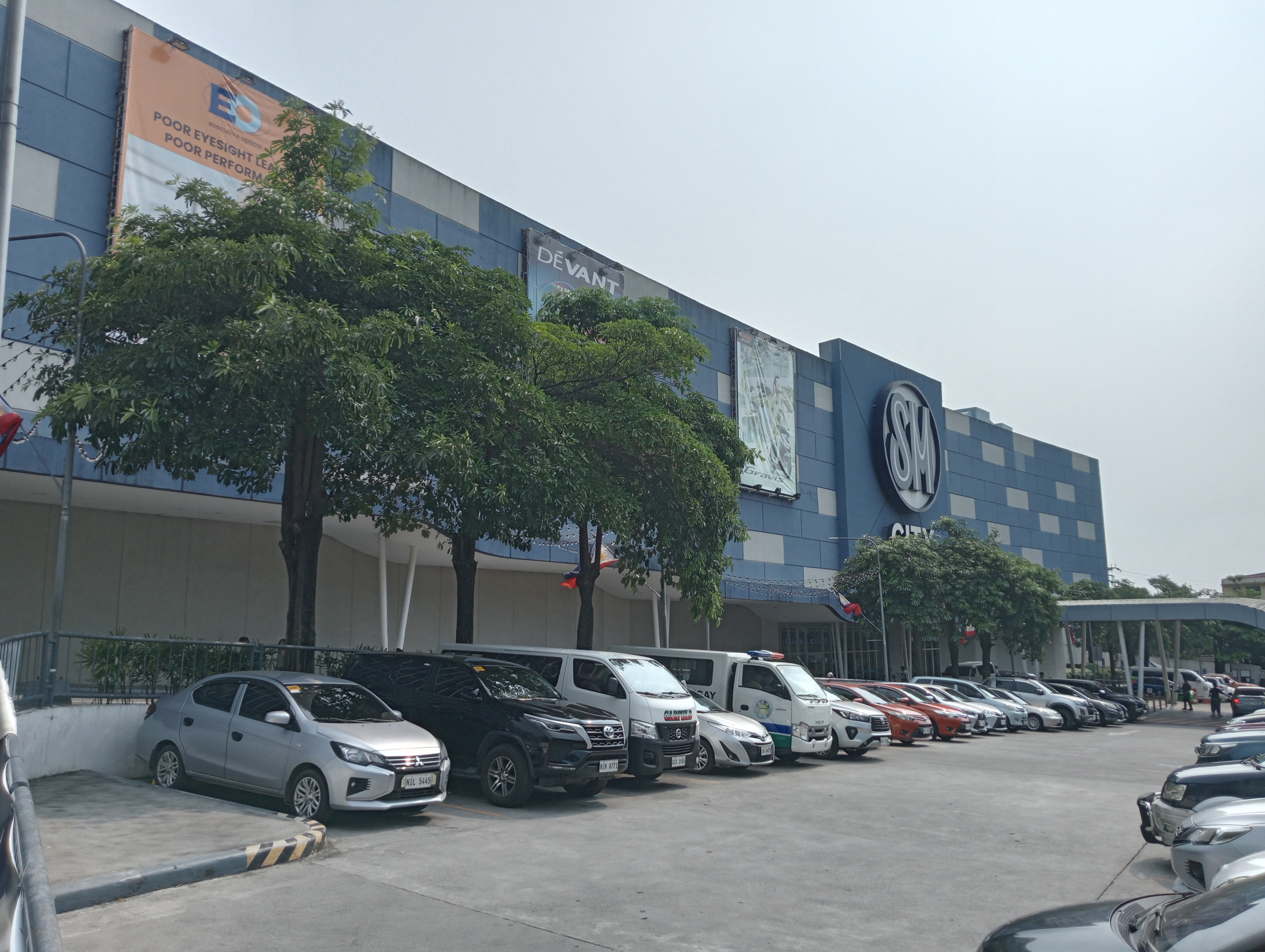
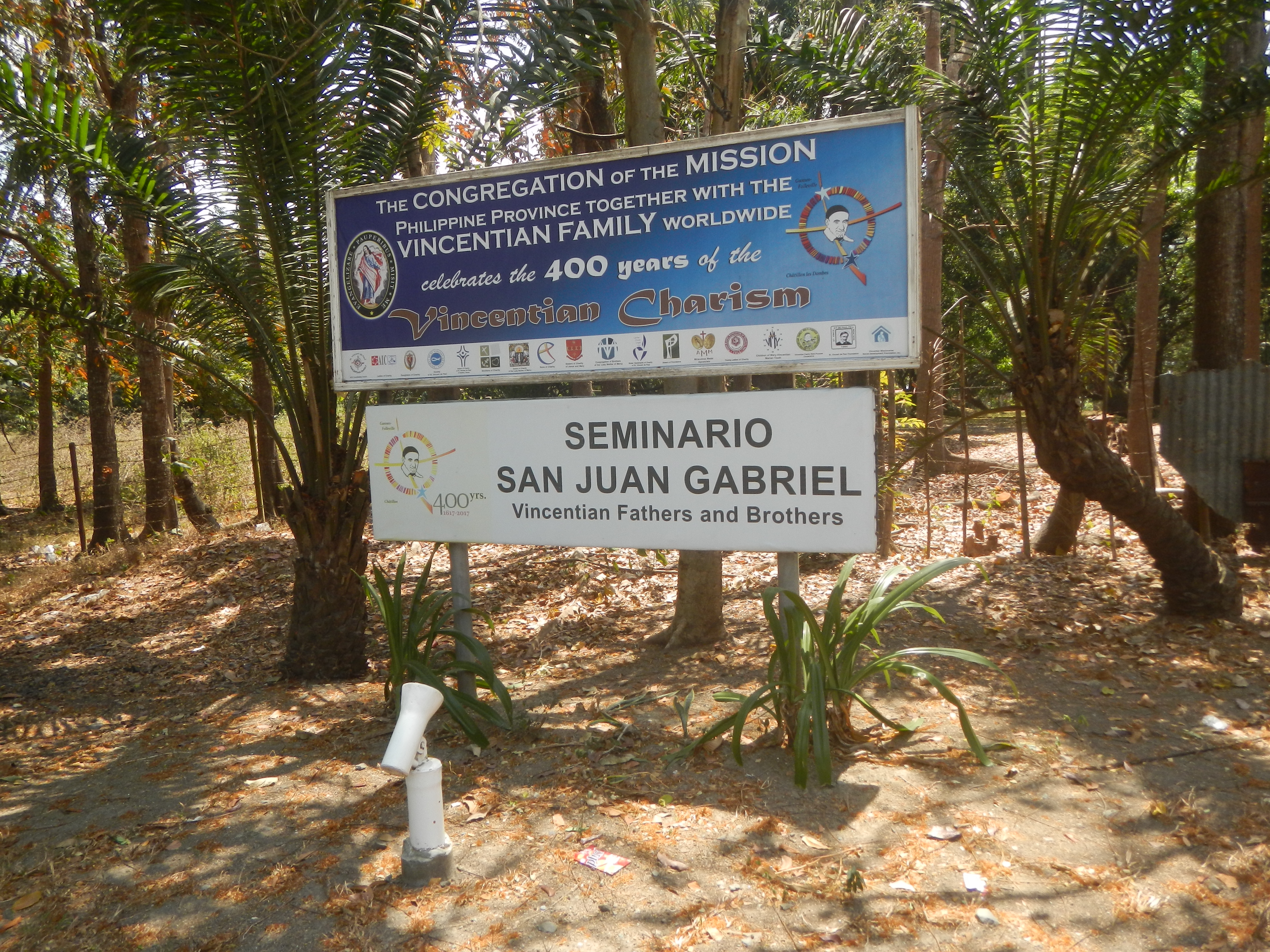
- Cavite Provincial Capitol City Hall of Trece Martires Saint Jude Thaddeus Parish Church Governor's Drive SM City Trece Martires San Juan Gabriel Seminary

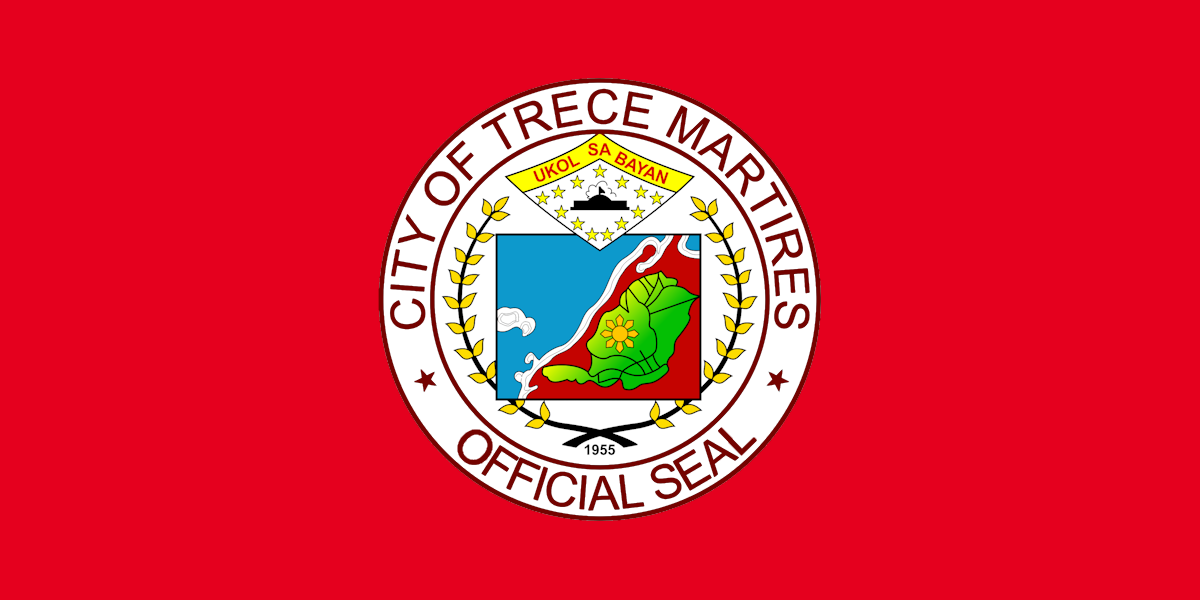
- Flag Seal
- Nicknames: Trece; Seat of Provincial Government
- Motto: Bagong Trece: Puso ng Cavite, Lungsod ng Pag-asa; The New Trece: Heart of Cavite Province, the City of Hope
- Map of Cavite with Trece Martires highlighted
- Interactive map of Trece Martires
- Location within the Philippines
- Coordinates: 14°17′N 120°52′E
- Country: Philippines
- Region: Calabarzon
- Province: Cavite
- District: 7th district
- Founded and Cityhood: May 24, 1954
- Named for: Thirteen Martyrs of Cavite
- Barangays: 13 (see Barangays)

Government
  - Type: Sangguniang Panlungsod
  - Mayor: Gemma B. Lubigan
  - Vice Mayor: Romeo L. Montehermoso Jr.
  - Representative: Crispin Diego D. Remulla
  - City Council: Members: Joyce Ann C. Mojica; Tracy Ann S. Anacan; Kim Paolo C. Lubigan; Anne Jomille D. Humarang; Jay-em C. Cunanan; Antonio G. Lontoc; Anselmo L. Trinidad; Angelito E. Vidallon; Gregor C. Buendia; Leonardo Agustin T. Montehermoso
  - Electorate: 121,194 voters (2025)

Area
  - Total: 39.10 km^{2} (15.10 sq mi)
- Elevation: 123 m (404 ft)
- Highest elevation: 258 m (846 ft)
- Lowest elevation: 37 m (121 ft)

Population (2024 census)
  - Total: 227,892
  - Density: 5,828/km^{2} (15,100/sq mi)
  - Households: 50,312
- Demonym: Treceño

Economy
  - Income class: 2nd city income class
  - Poverty incidence: 10.83% (2023)
  - Revenue: ₱ 1,524 million (2024)
  - Assets: ₱ 4,546 million (2024)
  - Expenditure: ₱ 751.7 million (2024)
  - Liabilities: ₱ 1,298 million (2024)

Service provider
  - Electricity: Manila Electric Company (Meralco)
- Time zone: UTC+8 (PST)
- ZIP code: 4109
- PSGC: 042122000
- IDD : area code: +63 (0)46
- Native languages: Tagalog
- Numbered highways: N64 (Tanza–Trece Martires Road); N65 (Governor's Drive); N404 (Trece Martires–Indang Road); N405 (Governor's Drive)
- Catholic diocese: Diocese of Imus
- Patron saint: St. Jude Thaddeus; St. Lorenzo Ruiz
- Website: trecemartirescity.gov.ph

Trece Martires, (Note: Tagalog: [ˈtɾɛsɛ ˌmaɾtɪˈɾɛs], Latin American Spanish: [ˈtɾese ˈmaɾtiɾes], European Spanish: [ˈtɾeθe ˈmaɾtiɾes]) officially the City of Trece Martires, (Note: Filipino: Lungsod ng Trece Martires) is a component city and seat of government of the province of Cavite, Philippines. According to the 2024 census, it has a population of 227,892 people.

It serves as the administrative center of the province, where it has long been described as Cavite's de facto capital, having previously served as its official capital until 1977, when Presidential Decree No. 1163 designated Imus as the new capital. Despite the legal transfer, the city still hosts the majority of the offices of the provincial government and some national-level agencies.

== Etymology ==
Trece Martires, which is Spanish for "thirteen martyrs", is named after the Thirteen Martyrs of Cavite—a group of prominent Caviteños convicted of rebellion and executed by the Spanish colonial government on September 12, 1896, in Cavite Puerto (present-day Cavite City) during the Philippine Revolution.

== History ==
=== Township ===
Trece Martires started as one of the largest and most remote barrios of Cavite. Originally named Quinta or Quintana, it was part of the municipality of Tanza. The land was basically agricultural subdivided into cattle ranches and sugar farms, with less than 1,000 hectares, at the intersection of the present Tanza–Trece Martires–Indang Road (Tanza–Trece Martires Road / Trece Martires–Indang Road) and the Naic–Dasmariñas Road (now part of Governor's Drive).

=== Cityhood ===
The city was established on May 24, 1954, under Republic Act No. 981 ("The Charter of Trece Martires City") as approved by President Ramon Magsaysay. The Republic Act also transferred the provincial seat of government from Cavite City to Trece Martires. The original bill, House Bill 1795, was authored by Congressman Jose T. Cajulis (1954–1957) and Senator Justiniano S. Montano (1949–1956).

Under the city charter, the Governor of Cavite is ex-officio mayor of Trece Martires; then-Governor Dominador Mangubat was installed as the city's first chief executive. On January 2, 1956, the provincial capital was formally inaugurated, the same day when Delfin N. Montano (the son of former Senator Justiniano Montano) was sworn into office as the new governor. He served in both offices from 1956 to 1971.

On June 22, 1957, the original act was amended by Republic Act No. 1912 increasing its territory to 3,917 hectares (39,170,000 m^{2}), more or less. Consequently, the municipalities of Indang and General Trias had to yield parts of their respective areas to this territorial expansion.

The provincial-local power company was established in 1957, as the Cavite Electricity Distribution Authority. The company would later also manage communications infrastructure.

The city high school was established in 1966, becoming nationalized later in 1983.

=== 1970s to 1990s ===
On June 11, 1977, President Ferdinand Marcos signed Presidential Decree No. 1163, relocating the capital and seat of government of Cavite from Trece Martires to the municipality of Imus. Cavite Governor Juanito Remulla requested Marcos in September 1979 to transfer the capital back to the city, but his request was denied. However, the city still hosts majority of provincial and national-level agency offices, making it the de facto capital of Cavite.

Since establishment, the city never elected its own mayor. In January 1988, the city attempted to elect its own local officials to run the affairs of the city and ease the burden of the ex-officio city officials. However, it was denied by the Supreme Court Resolution dated January 12, 1988.

In the 1990 Census, the city breached 15,000 residents, almost double the last number from the previous census in 1980.

On March 31, 1992, President Corazon Aquino signed Republic Act No. 7325, which amended the charter of Trece Martires, allowing the city to vote their own local officials for the first time. Prudencio Panganiban became Trece Martires' first mayor-elect.

The local water district was created in 1997.

=== 21st century ===
Sherwood Hills Golf Club started construction in 1997 and was opened to members in 1998. It is a major landholder in the city. It was ranked 85th in Golf Digest's Top 100 Golf Courses Outside the US in 2007.

A campus of the Cavite State University was built in Barangay Osorio in 2005. After a few years, the city government established its own local college, Trece Martires City College in 2009.

From 2000 to 2007, Trece Martires more than doubled its population from 40,000 to 90,000, making it the fastest growing city in the country during that period. The succeeding years also followed this trend. It was caused by the influx of new residents choosing to live in its private subdivisions. This growth coincided with the opening of new industrial estates in nearby General Trias and Dasmariñas, namely New Cavite Industrial City, First Cavite Industrial Estate and Gateway Business Park, which hosted an Intel plant starting 1997.

The city sustained this population boom from 2014 onwards, led by the construction of resettlement sites around the city. The National Housing Authority, for instance, built 19,000 housing units for relocatees from the National Capital Region to reside in. These sites are in Barangays Osorio, Hugo Perez, Lallana, Cabuco, Aguado and Inocencio.

Several commercial establishments opened in the city, starting with WalterMart in 2012, Tower Mall in 2015, and finally, SM Trece Martires in 2016.

== Geography ==
Trece Martires is in the heart of Cavite Province. It is bounded north and northwest by the municipality of Tanza, west and southwest by the municipality of Naic, south by the municipality of Indang, southeast by the municipality of Amadeo and east by the city of General Trias.

=== Topography ===
The city of Trece Martires is characterised with ground elevation ranging from 30 meters (98 ft) to nearly 400 meters (1,300 ft). Its ground slope ranges from 0.5 to 2%.

The land area is fairly well dissected by creeks and streams that are deeply cut, characterized by steep and abrupt banks. These almost parallel drainage lines flow in northern direction to discharge into either Manila Bay or Laguna de Bay.

=== Climate ===
Trece Martires City has a tropical climate (Köppen climate classification: Aw) with two pronounced seasons: wet and dry. Wet season covers the period from May to December of each year; dry season covers January to April.

Climate data for Trece Martires City
Month	Jan	Feb	Mar	Apr	May	Jun	Jul	Aug	Sep	Oct	Nov	Dec	Year
Mean daily maximum °C (°F)	29.3 (84.7)	30.2 (86.4)	31.7 (89.1)	33.1 (91.6)	32.7 (90.9)	31.2 (88.2)	30 (86)	29.7 (85.5)	29.9 (85.8)	30.3 (86.5)	29.9 (85.8)	28.3 (82.9)	29.9 (85.8)
Daily mean °C (°F)	25.2 (77.4)	25.6 (78.1)	26.8 (80.2)	28.2 (82.8)	28.2 (82.8)	27.4 (81.3)	26.5 (79.7)	26.4 (79.5)	26.5 (79.7)	26.6 (79.9)	26.1 (79.0)	25.4 (77.7)	26.6 (79.8)
Mean daily minimum °C (°F)	21.2 (70.2)	21.1 (70.0)	22 (72)	23.3 (73.9)	23.8 (74.8)	23.6 (74.5)	23.1 (73.6)	23.2 (73.8)	23.1 (73.6)	22.9 (73.2)	22.4 (72.3)	21.8 (71.2)	22.6 (72.8)
Average precipitation mm (inches)	21 (0.8)	10 (0.4)	13 (0.5)	24 (0.9)	147 (5.8)	265 (10.4)	409 (16.1)	437 (17.2)	332 (13.1)	190 (7.5)	141 (5.6)	79 (3.1)	2,068 (81.4)
Source: Climate-data.org

=== Barangays ===
Trece Martires is politically subdivided into 13 barangays, as indicated in the matrix below and the image herein. Each barangay consists of puroks and some have sitios.

The city was subdivided by Senator Justiniano Montano and Congressman Jose Cajulis. Each barangay was named after one of the Thirteen Martyrs of Cavite to commemorate their bravery and heroism. Below are the names of the barangays and their names before the city's Charter was passed on May 24, 1954.

Currently, there are 6 barangays which are classified as urban.

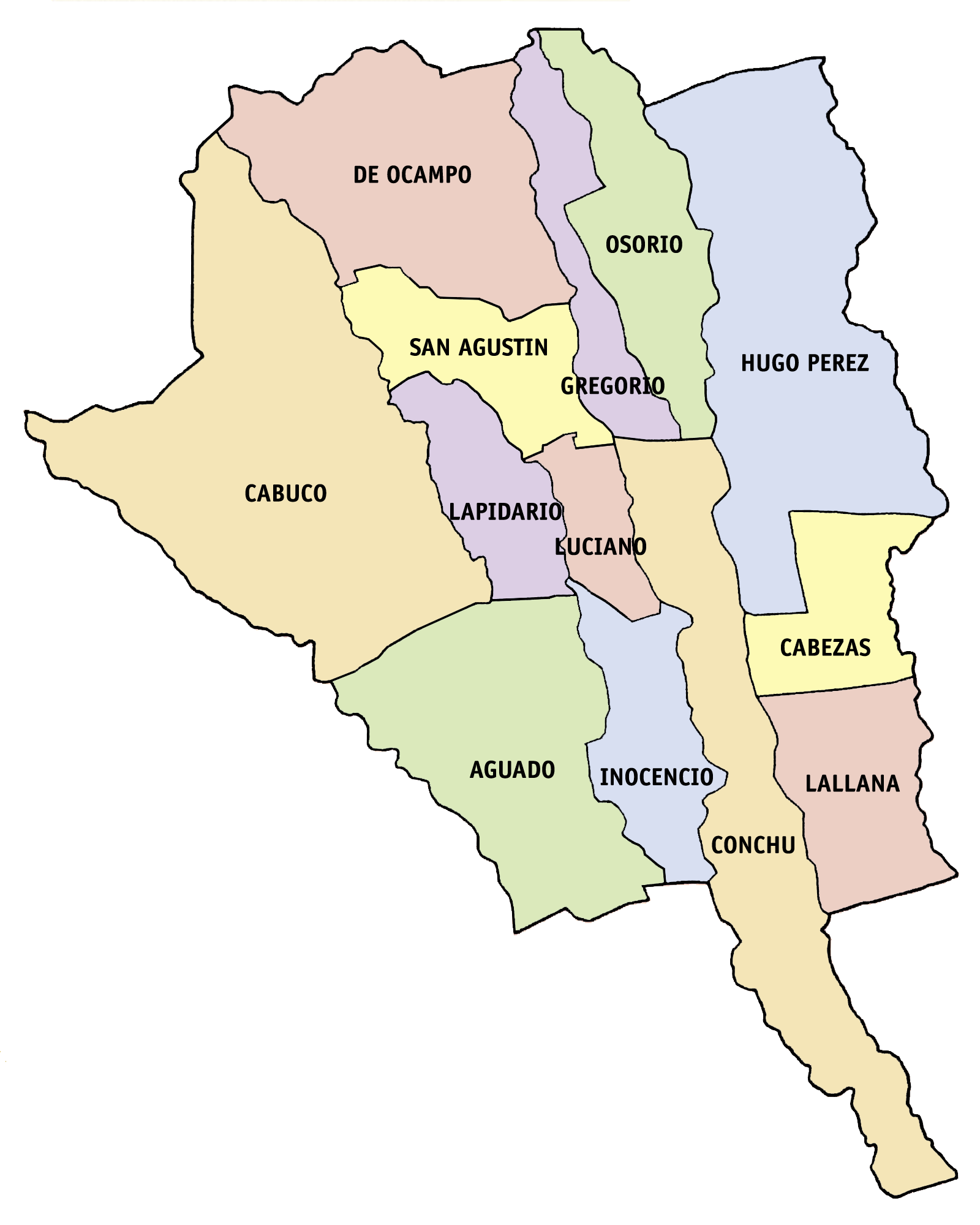
Political map of Trece Martires

PSGC	Barangay	Population			±% p.a.	
		2024		2010		
042122002	Cabezas	3.2%	7,363	4,470	▴	3.49%
042122003	Cabuco	16.9%	38,621	8,756	▴	10.75%
042122004	De Ocampo	5.5%	12,628	7,580	▴	3.57%
042122005	Lallana	1.8%	4,135	1,204	▴	8.86%
042122006	San Agustin (Poblacion)	4.1%	9,307	8,566	▴	0.57%
042122008	Osorio	4.8%	11,032	8,254	▴	2.02%
042122009	Conchu	4.1%	9,341	5,580	▴	3.61%
042122010	Hugo Perez	18.7%	42,606	4,997	▴	15.88%
042122011	Aguado	8.8%	20,011	9,976	▴	4.90%
042122012	Gregorio	2.3%	5,166	3,953	▴	1.86%
042122013	Inocencio	12.5%	28,471	24,330	▴	1.09%
042122014	Lapidario	5.6%	12,817	10,801	▴	1.18%
042122015	Luciano (Poblacion)	4.0%	9,005	6,092	▴	2.72%
	Total		227,892	104,559	▴	5.50%

== Demographics ==
Population census of Trece Martires
Year	Pop.	±% p.a.
1960	4,422	—
1970	6,522	+3.96%
1975	7,179	+1.94%
1980	8,579	+3.63%
1990	15,686	+6.22%
1995	20,451	+5.10%
2000	41,653	+16.47%
2007	90,177	+11.24%
2010	104,559	+5.53%
2015	155,713	+7.88%
2020	210,503	+6.55%
2024	227,892	+1.92%
Source: Philippine Statistics Authority

In the 2024 census, the population of Trece Martires was 227,892 people, with a density of 5,800 inhabitants per square kilometer or 15,000 inhabitants per square mile.

== Economy ==
Poverty incidence of Trece Martires (%)

Source: Philippine Statistics Authority

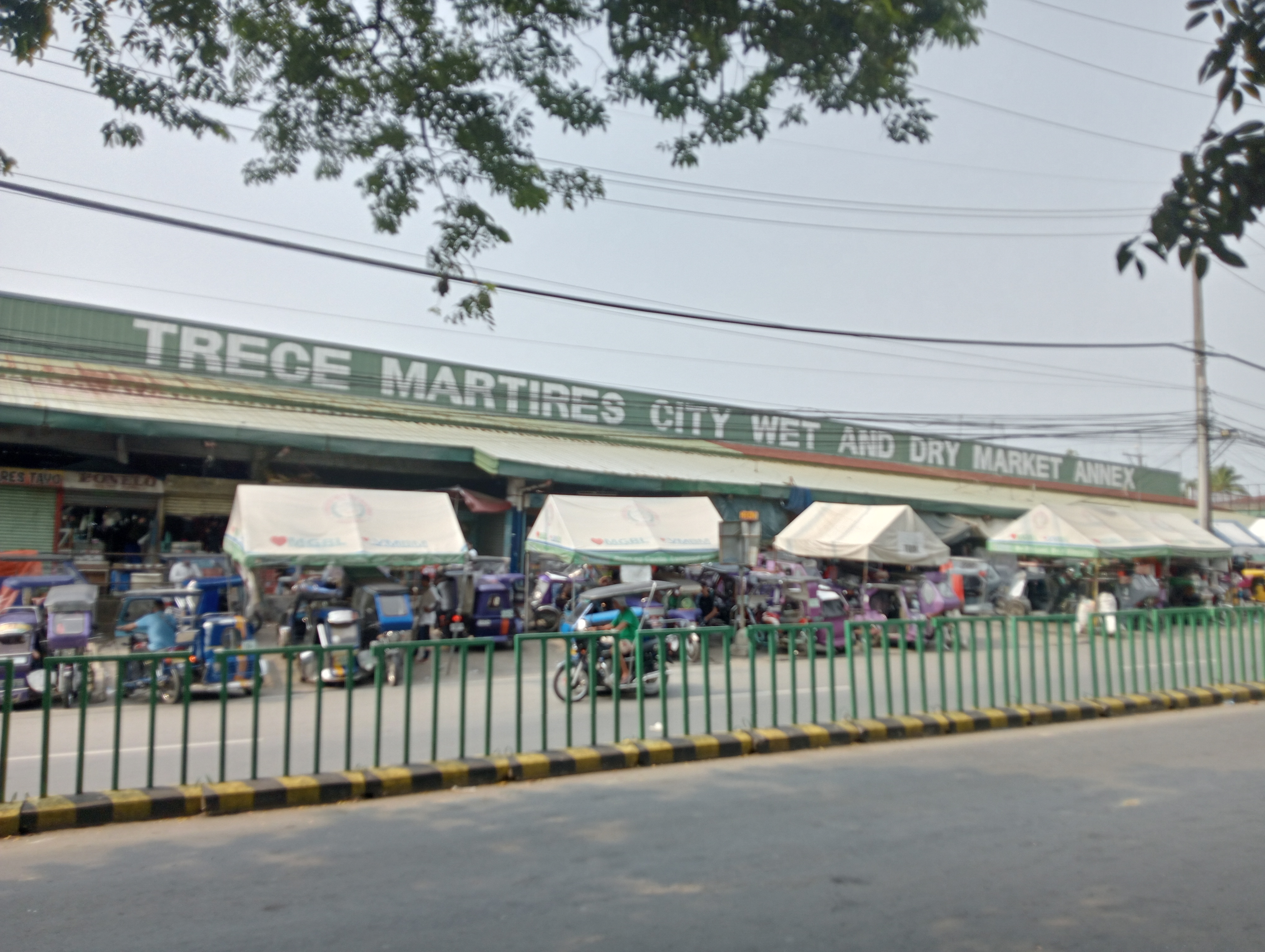
Trece Martires City Wet & Dry Market Annex

Historically, the city economy was reliant on agriculture. However, with the conversion of land from agricultural to commercial, industrial and residential purposes, this has changed, leading to a decrease in farming activity. Conversely, the services sector is growing.

=== Agriculture ===
In 2013, only 10% of Trece Martires' land area was devoted to agriculture. The farmers of the city plant rice, corn, root crops and vegetables. The city also produces ornamental flowers; it harvested the highest amount of sampaguita amongst the towns and cities in Cavite in 2013.

=== Retail ===
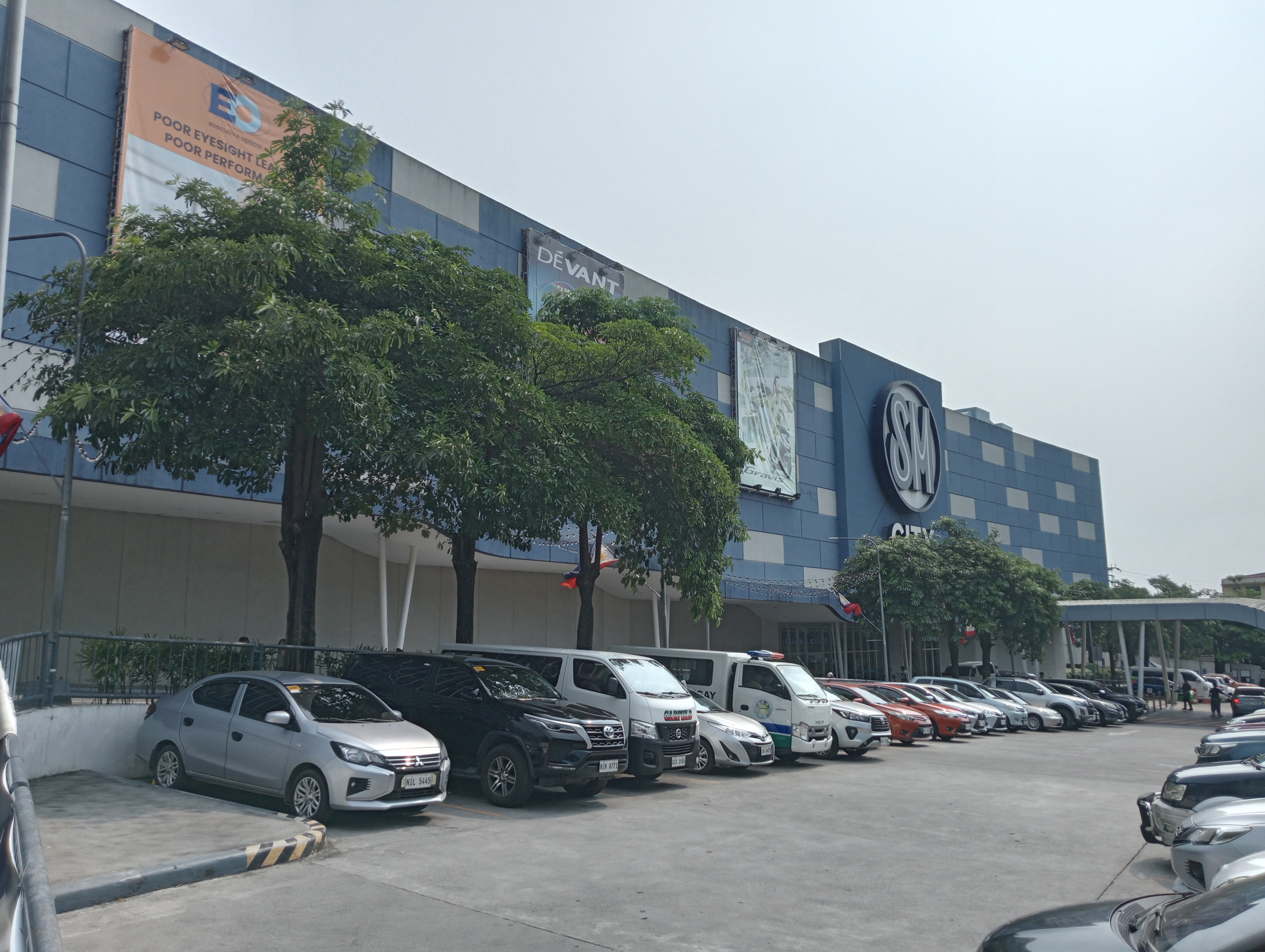
SM City Trece Martires

During the 2010s, the city enjoyed new investments in the form of new business establishments. These include WalterMart Trece Martires, the largest Walter Mart mall in Cavite along Governor's Drive, in 2012; and two Puregold stores in Barangays Hugo Perez and San Agustin. In 2015, Trece Tower Mall was opened, while the SM City Trece Martires, the fifth SM Supermall in Cavite was opened in 2016. The first Alfamart store in the Philippines was built in Brgy. Hugo Perez, along Governor's Drive.

=== Banking ===
Trece Martires also has a number of banks and financial institutions serving its residents and nearby towns. Trece Martires hosts 18 banks. Its total volume of bank deposits reached 16.3 billion pesos in 2021.

=== Real estate ===
Philippine real estate giant Megaworld and its subsidiary Global-Estate Resorts, Inc. entered the city in the late 2010s and launched two major townships. The first one, Arden Botanical Estates was launched in 2019. It is a 251-hectare township straddling the borders of Trece Martires and Tanza, and will feature an expansive variety of gardens and natural parks around the development. The Blue zone project features residential and leisure villages including the 18.1-hectare Arden Botanical Village and the 15.2-hectare Arden Westpark Village. GERI also inaugurated the 18.3-hectare The Lindgren's Scandinavian inspired houses. Renowned landscape architect and PGAA Creative Design founder, Paulo G. Alcazaren designed the Arden Botanical Village, the 8.3-hectare Arden Botanical Estate Town Center and Centrera Park with its Breathing Chapel, Arden Bike Trails and an amphitheater.

The second one is Sherwood Hills, which was launched in 2023. It will be redeveloped after the golf course and surround landholdings was acquired by a Megaworld subsidiary in 2011. Spanning 340 hectares, the project is envisioned to be an "integrated lifestyle community".

== Infrastructure ==
The city government provides the following assistance: financial, medical, emergency, school fees and burial expenses. It has extensive programs for the elderly, solo parents, out-of-school youth, and mothers. One of its programs is a blood donation activity every March, May, September and December; Balik Eskwela (school supplies distribution to all public elementary and high school students); clean and green; revitalization of agricultural lands, high school and college scholarship and their livelihood programs.

=== Roads ===
Trece Martires is in the center of Cavite, in the junction of Governor's Drive that runs in an east-west direction; and Tanza–Trece Martires Road and Trece Martires–Indang Road which runs in a north-south direction. Both roads are national roads. There are also several provincial-level roads, such as Marcius Avenue and VM Alex Lubigan Road in the city center, and Conchu Road in the east. Other roads serve as connections from residential areas located further away from the main thoroughfares, such as Lapidario Road, Market Road, Panungyanan Road and Osorio Road.

While the city has no expressways in its jurisdiction, the upcoming Cavite–Laguna Expressway will have an exit in Gen. Trias, along Governor's Drive. This exit will be around 7 kilometers away from Trece Martires' city center.

=== Public transport ===
Buses and jeepneys serve the city. Vans, multicabs and tricycles are also prevalent. There are buses from Parañaque Integrated Terminal Exchange in Baclaran, connecting the city to Metro Manila. Jeepneys serve routes going to EPZA (Rosario), Dasmariñas, Manggahan (General Trias), Tanza, and Indang. Vans and multicabs connect to other towns and urban centers such as Alabang and Lawton Avenue. Tricycles ply the inner roads.

=== Parks and open spaces ===
Trece Martires used to have a large athletic oval but it has since been redeveloped into an SM Mall and an apartment complex. In 2021, the city government broke ground for a new park called Trece Martires People's Park in a 1.8 hectare property in Brgy Lapidario, near the capitol. It is planned to have a gymnasium, convention center, and an outdoor amphitheater.

=== Healthcare ===
The Gen. Emilio Aguinaldo Memorial Hospital in Barangay Luciano is a 284-bed, government-run hospital for the people of the city.

The city also has private hospital: Korea-Philippines Friendship Hospital in Barangay Luciano; the MV Santiago Medical Center in Barangay De Ocampo; the Treceño Medical Pavillon Hospital in Barangay Luciano.

On the other hand, the Cavite Center for Mental Health is in Barangay Luciano. It is a public mental health care facility under the supervision of the Department of Health, one of only two in Calabarzon.

=== Police and fire services ===
Police outposts are found in barangays Osorio, Inocencio, De Ocampo and Conchu.

The fire station of the city is located in Barangay San Agustin.

== Government ==
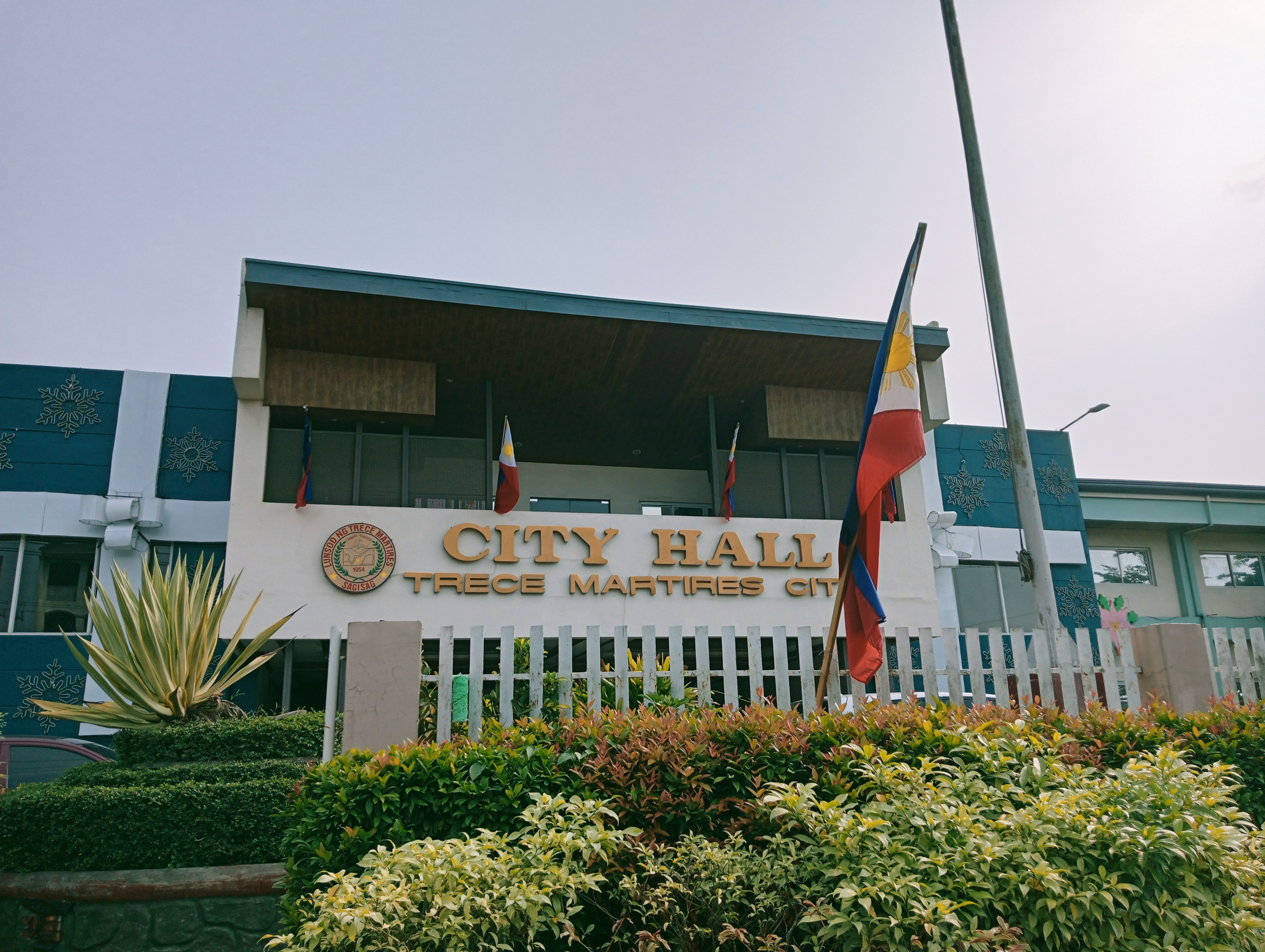
Trece Martires City Hall

=== Elected officials ===
Current officials of the City of Trece Martires

Position	Name
Mayor	Gemma B. Lubigan
Vice Mayor	Romeo L. Montehermoso
Sangguniang Panlungsod Members (City Councilors)	Joyce Ann C. Mojica-Baking
Sangguniang Panlungsod Members (City Councilors)	Tracy Anne S. Anacan
Sangguniang Panlungsod Members (City Councilors)	Kim Paolo C. Lubigan
Sangguniang Panlungsod Members (City Councilors)	Anne Jomille D. Humarang
Sangguniang Panlungsod Members (City Councilors)	Jay-em C. Cunanan
Sangguniang Panlungsod Members (City Councilors)	Antonio G. Lontoc
Sangguniang Panlungsod Members (City Councilors)	Anselmo L. Trinidad
Sangguniang Panlungsod Members (City Councilors)	Angelito E. Vidallon
Sangguniang Panlungsod Members (City Councilors)	Gregor C. Buendia
Sangguniang Panlungsod Members (City Councilors)	Leonardo Agustin T. Montehermoso
Sangguniang Panlungsod Members (City Councilors)	Mark Albert Montehermoso (ABC President)
Sangguniang Panlungsod Members (City Councilors)	Tiery Rogel N. Nueva (SK Federation President)

=== Barangay officials ===
Barangay	Previous name	Barangay captain	Settlement type
Aguado	Fiscal Mundo	Jaimer M. Sierra	Rural
Cabezas	Palawit	Jaddy Alarca	Rural
Cabuco	Kanggahan	Mark Albert Montehermoso	Rural
Conchu	Lagundian	Irene R. Aure	Rural
De Ocampo	Quintana I	Sonny Montehermoso	Urban
Gregorio	Aliang	Eliseo C. Dela Luya	Rural
Hugo Perez	Lukbanan	Raymundo A. Villa	Urban
Inocencio	Bagong Pook	Rosendo P. Dilidili	Urban
Lallana	Panukang Gubat	Cecille M. Decillo	Rural
Lapidario	Bayog	Remelyn Dilag-Sierra	Urban
Luciano (Poblacion)	Bitangan	Luisito R. Diloy	Urban
Osorio	Project	Robert Penus	Rural
San Agustin (Poblacion)	Quintana II	Cornelio L. de Sagun	Urban

== Education ==
=== High schools ===
- Trece Martires City National High School – Main (San Agustin Campus)
- Eugenio Cabezas National High School (formerly known as TMCNHS – Cabezas Annex)
- Francisco Osorio Integrated Senior High School (formerly known as Francisco Osorio National High School and TMCNHS – Osorio Annex)
- Luis Aguado National High School (formerly known as TMCNHS – Southville Annex)
- Trece Martires City National High School – Conchu Annex
- Trece Martires City National High School – Cabuco Extension
- Fiscal Mundo National High School (formerly Luis Aguado National High School - South Summit Extension)
- Trece Martires City National High School – Hugo Perez Extension
- Trece Martires City National High School – Sunshine Ville Extension
- Trece Martires City Senior High School

=== Private schools ===
- Academy of St. John Nepomucene
- Amore International School (Amore Academy)
- Blessed Family Academy
- Blessed Kateri School
- Braintrust Learning Center inc.
- Christian Child Development Learning Center
- Colegio de Santa Rosa
- Dei Gracia Academy
- Elim Christian Academy
- Fabulous Christian Academy
- Gateway International School of Science and Technology
- God is Good Learning Center
- John Merced Academy
- Krislizz International Academy
- Lyceum of Cavite-East
- Maranatha Christian Academy
- Marella Christianne Institute
- New Generation International School
- Notre Dame of Trece Martires
- Our Lady of Lourdes Academy Learning Center
- Paul Henry
- Saint Jude Parish School
- Saint Thomas Becket Academy
- Santo Niño de Praga Academy
- Sun Moon Academy
- Sung Kwang Global Leadership Academy
- Trece Martires Integrated Laboratory School

=== Colleges ===
- Cavite State University – Trece Martires City Campus
- Colegio de Amore
- Imus Computer College (ICC) – Trece Martires City Branch
- Trece Martires City College

== Notable people ==
- Kate Valdez - actress and model

== Annual events ==
- The town fiesta of Trece Martires City is celebrated every October 27–28 in honor of Saint Jude Thaddeus.
- The Festival of Hope, which started in 2023, celebrates the city's transformation and hope for a better future. It coincides with the city charter anniversary known as Araw ng Trece Martires (Trece Martires Day), celebrated on May 24 each year.
- Feast of Holy Cross is celebrated on September 14.
- The Death Anniversary of Thirteen Martyrs of Cavite is celebrated annually on September 12 to commemorate the martyrdom of the Thirteen Martyrs who were executed for joining the revolt of Katipunan during the Spanish Era. Activities like exhibits and the reenactment of the Thirteen Martyrs are done during the yearly celebration.

== Sister cities ==
=== International ===
- Tainan, Taiwan

=== Local ===
- Makati
- Zamboanga City (since 2009)

== Notes ==
Preceded by Cavite City	Capital of Cavite de facto 1954–present	Incumbent
Preceded by Cavite City	Capital of Cavite de jure 1954–1977	Succeeded by Imus
