= N405 highway =

Road in the Philippines

Route 405
- Governor's Drive; Naic Junction–Caylabne Road

Route information
- Maintained by Department of Public Works and Highways (DPWH) – Cavite 2nd District Engineering Office
- Length: 24.19 km (15.03 mi)

Major junctions
- East end: N402 (Naic–Indang Road) in Naic
- N406 (Maragondon–Magallanes–Amuyong Road) in Maragondon; N407 (Ternate–Nasugbu Road) in Ternate
- West end: Point Mai in Ternate

Location
- Country: Philippines
- Provinces: Cavite
- Towns: Naic, Maragondon, Ternate

Highway system
- Roads in the Philippines; Highways; Expressways; List
← N404	→ N406

National Route 405 (N405) forms part of the Philippine highway network. It runs through western Cavite. It connects the municipality of Naic to Caylabne Bay.

== Route description ==
The highway, though consisting of component roads of different names, is officially named by DPWH as Juanito Remulla Sr. Road, which is the official name of one of its component roads, Governor's Drive.

=== Governor's Drive ===
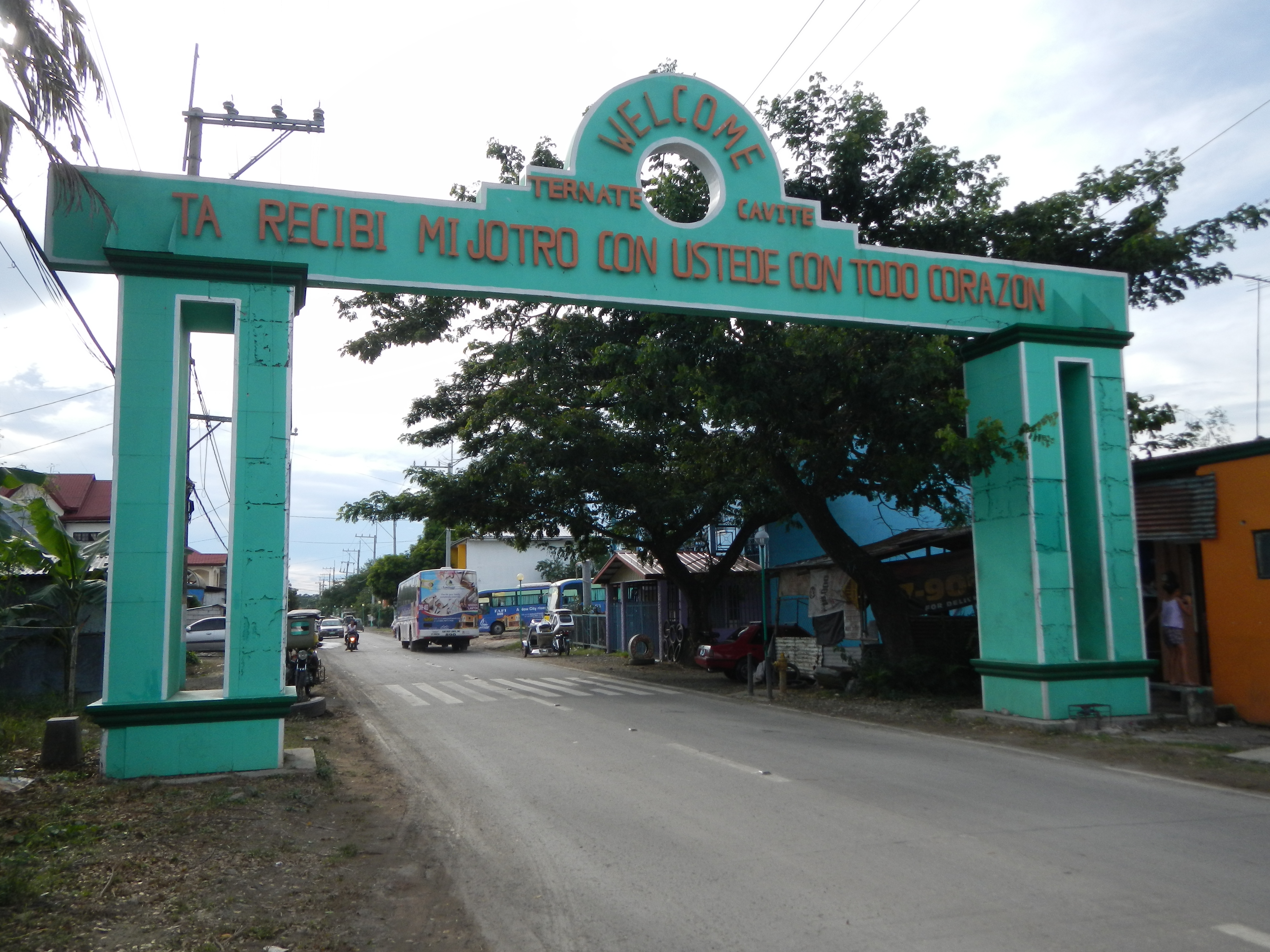
Ternate Welcome Arch

N405 runs from the municipality of Naic to Ternate, Cavite as Governor's Drive. It starts at the intersection with N402, specifically the Naic–Indang Road and Capt. C. Nazareno Street in Barangay San Roque, Naic. It then passes through the municipalities of Maragondon and Ternate. Finally, it meets its intersection with Caylabne Road and Ternate–Nasugbu Road at the Mounts Palay-Palay–Mataas-na-Gulod Protected Landscape in Ternate.

=== Caylabne Road ===
N405 then turns north as Caylabne Road, which connects Ternate to Caylabne Bay. The highway ends at Point Mai, where a gate to Caylabne Bay Resort is found, as the road continues into the resort as an unnumbered street.
