= Ternate, Cavite =

Municipality in Cavite, Philippines

Ternate Bahra
- Municipality
- Municipality of Ternate
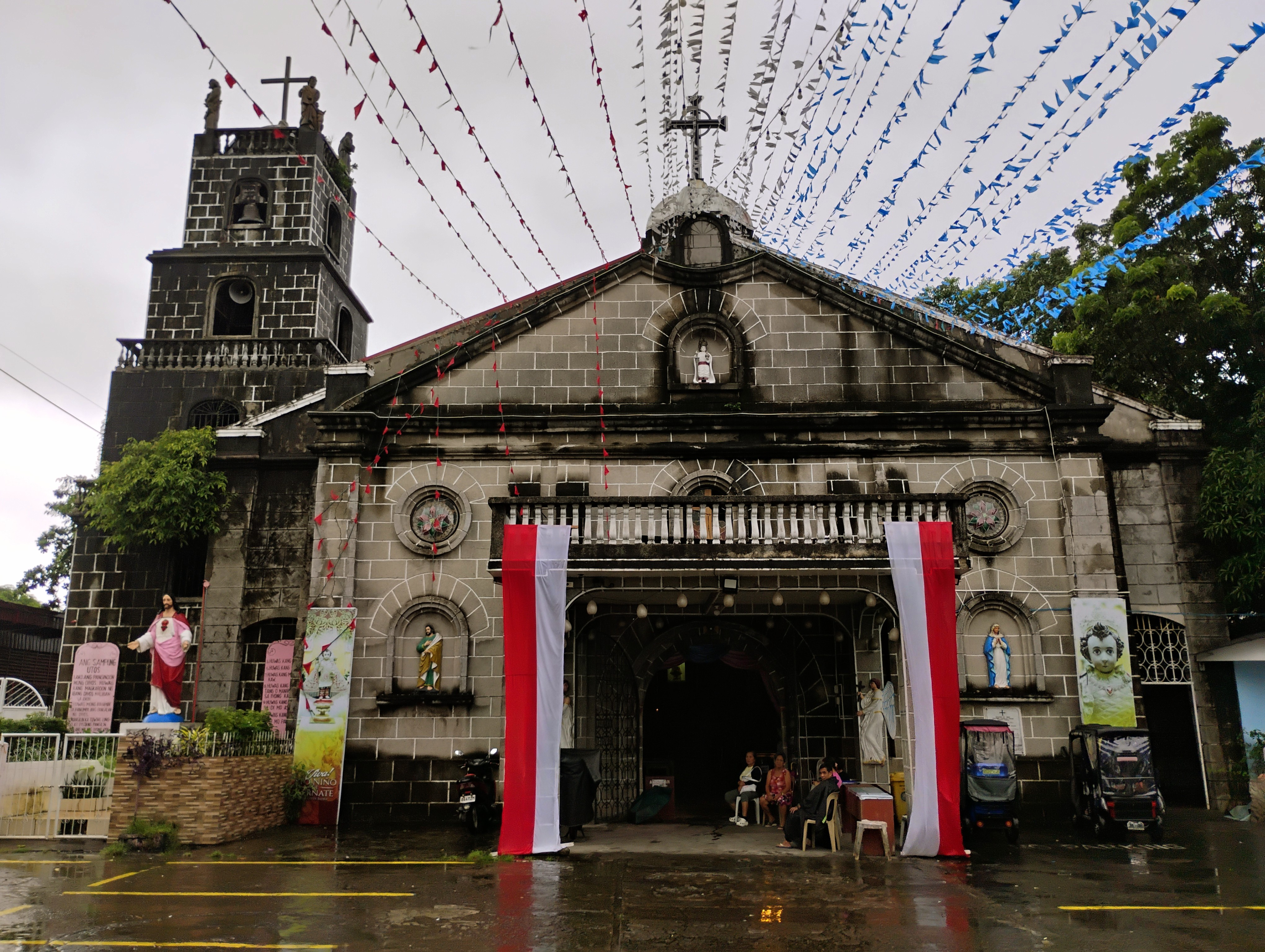
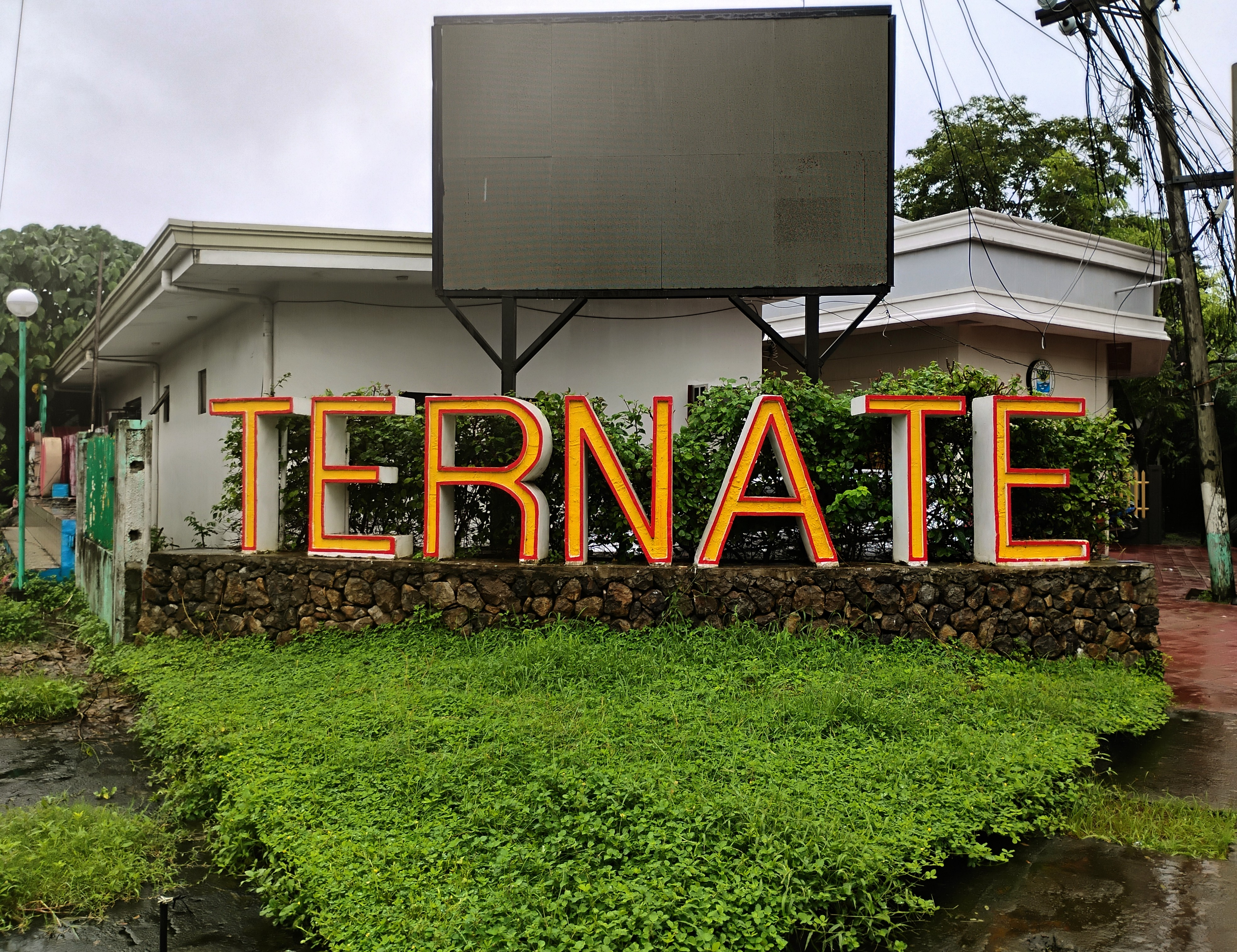
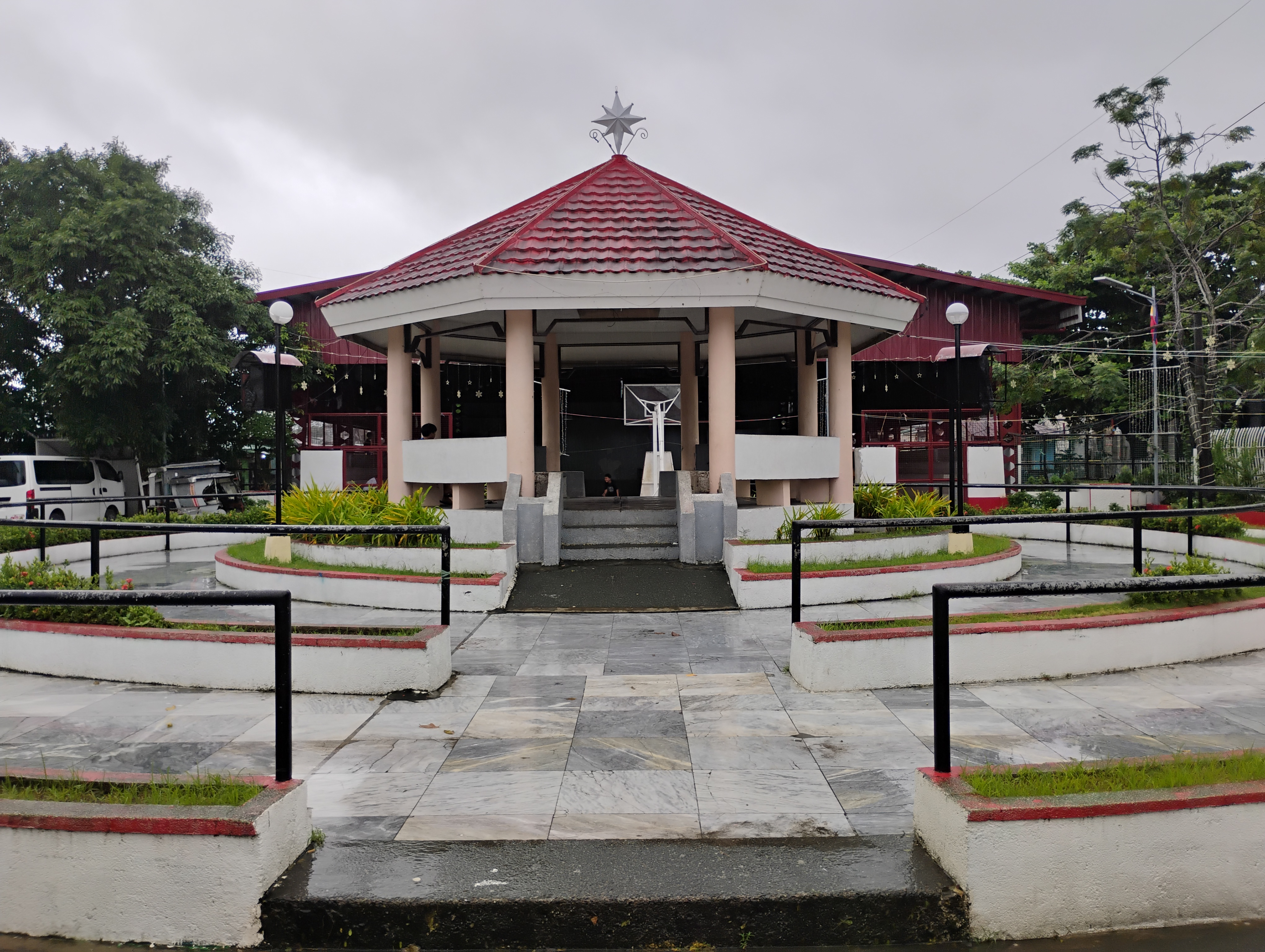
- Santo Niño de Ternate Parish Church Ternate Marker along Governor's Drive Ternate Town Plaza

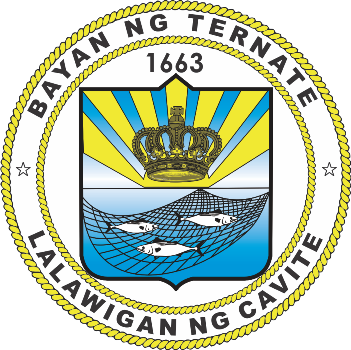
- Seal
- Nickname: Hispanic Centre of Luzon
- Map of Cavite with Ternate highlighted
- Interactive map of Ternate
- Location within the Philippines
- Coordinates: 14°17′N 120°43′E
- Country: Philippines
- Region: Calabarzon
- Province: Cavite
- District: 8th district
- Founded: 1857
- Annexation to Naic: October 15, 1903
- Chartered: January 1, 1916
- Named after: Ternate, Indonesia
- Barangays: 10 (see Barangays)

Government
  - Type: Sangguniang Bayan
  - Mayor: Lamberto D. Bambao
  - Vice Mayor: Calvin Kenneth C. Soberano
  - Representative: Aniela Bianca D. Tolentino
  - Municipal Council: Members: Laurel Lindo; Christian A. Bambao; Persival L. Garcia; Deonilo I. Bersamina; Charito S. Mojica; Ryogie Cachuela; Romel G. Anit; Gomez B. Linayao (ABC)
  - Electorate: 17,919 voters (2025)

Area
  - Total: 59.93 km^{2} (23.14 sq mi)
- Elevation: 53 m (174 ft)
- Highest elevation: 649 m (2,129 ft)
- Lowest elevation: 0 m (0 ft)

Population (2024 census)
  - Total: 24,891
  - Density: 415.3/km^{2} (1,076/sq mi)
  - Households: 6,344
- Demonym: Ternateño

Economy
  - Income class: 3rd municipal income class
  - Poverty incidence: 18.24% (2023)
  - Revenue: ₱ 144.5 million (2024)
  - Assets: ₱ 424.8 million (2024)
  - Expenditure: ₱ 67.8 million (2024)
  - Liabilities: ₱ 45.79 million (2024)

Service provider
  - Electricity: Manila Electric Company (Meralco)
- Time zone: UTC+8 (PST)
- ZIP code: 4111
- PSGC: 0402121000
- IDD : area code: +63 (0)46
- Native languages: Chavacano; Tagalog
- Website: www.ternate.cavite.gov.ph

Ternate, officially the Municipality of Ternate (Filipino: Bayan ng Ternate; Chavacano: Municipalidad de Ternate), is a municipality in the province of Cavite, Philippines. According to the 2024 census, it has a population of 24,891 people.

Formerly known as Bahra, the municipality is named after Ternate island of Indonesia where migrants from then Dutch East Indies originated.

== Etymology ==
The town is named after the Indonesian island of Ternate, which was the homeland of settlers in the region in the late 1600s as they were emigrants from the Moluccas. The town was also known as Barra or Bahra (from Barra de Maragondón) in Chavacano. Prior to the arrival of migrants, the area was known as Wawa by the native Tagalogs, from the Tagalog wawa ("river mouth" or "river delta").

== History ==
The Merdicas (also spelled Mardicas or Mardikas) were Catholic natives of the islands of Ternate and Tidore of the Moluccas, converted by Jesuit missionaries during the Portuguese occupation of the islands. The islands were later captured by the Spanish, who vied for their control with the Dutch. In 1663, the Spanish garrison in Ternate were forced to pull out to defend Manila against an impending invasion by Koxinga on the Kingdom of Tungning in modern Taiwan, sacrificing the Moluccas to the Dutch. Two hundred families of Merdicas (of mixed Mexican-Filipino-Spanish and Papuan-Indonesian-Portuguese descent) volunteered, and were resettled in a sandbar near the mouth of the Maragondon River (known as the Bahra de Maragondon) and Tanza, Cavite. Among them was their ruler, Sultan Said Din Burkat, who deported to Manila together with his entourage and family and later converted to Christianity.

The invasion did not occur as Koxinga fell ill and died. The Merdicas community eventually assimilated into the local population. Today, the descendants of the Merdicas continue to speak their Spanish creole (with Portuguese and Papuan influences), which came to be known as Ternateño Chabacano.

Ternate was once a barrio of Maragondón, and was the first town to attain full independence from it on March 31, 1857. The agreement was signed on behalf of the residents of Ternate by Tomás de León, Félix Nigosa, Pablo de León, Florencio Nino Franco and Juan Ramos.

On October 15, 1903, Ternate was merged with Naic by virtue of Act No. 947. It was later separated by virtue of Executive Order No. 96 in November 1915 but was effective only on January 1, 1916.

On March 3, 1992, Mayor Octavio Velasco, along with his two bodyguards and the town chief of police Felipe Enero, were assassinated in front of the municipal hall by five unknown gunmen, alleged to be bodyguards of then-Cavite Representative Jorge Núñez. As of March 1994, the assassins were still at large.

== Geography ==
Ternate is 47 kilometres (29 mi) from Imus and 57 kilometres (35 mi) from Manila.

=== Barangays ===
Ternate is politically subdivided into 10 barangays, as indicated in the matrix below. Each barangay consists of puroks and some have sitios.

Currently, there are 3 barangays which are classified as urban.

PSGC	Barangay	Population			±% p.a.	
		2024		2010		
042121001	Poblacion I (Barangay I)	7.6%	1,899	1,973	▾	−0.27%
042121002	Poblacion II (Barangay II)	8.1%	2,005	1,879	▴	0.45%
042121003	Bucana	4.5%	1,111	770	▴	2.59%
042121005	Poblacion III (Barangay III)	7.1%	1,757	1,769	▾	−0.05%
042121006	San José	7.9%	1,958	1,709	▴	0.95%
042121007	San Juan I	11.5%	2,865	2,494	▴	0.97%
042121008	Sapang I	29.8%	7,407	5,011	▴	2.76%
042121009	Poblacion I A	7.7%	1,909	1,421	▴	2.08%
042121010	San Juan II	6.7%	1,658	1,388	▴	1.25%
042121011	Sapang II	8.4%	2,084	883	▴	6.16%
	Total		24,891	19,297	▴	1.79%

=== Climate ===
Climate data for Ternate, Cavite
Month	Jan	Feb	Mar	Apr	May	Jun	Jul	Aug	Sep	Oct	Nov	Dec	Year
Mean daily maximum °C (°F)	29 (84)	30 (86)	32 (90)	34 (93)	32 (90)	31 (88)	29 (84)	29 (84)	29 (84)	30 (86)	30 (86)	29 (84)	30 (87)
Mean daily minimum °C (°F)	21 (70)	20 (68)	21 (70)	22 (72)	24 (75)	25 (77)	24 (75)	24 (75)	24 (75)	23 (73)	22 (72)	21 (70)	23 (73)
Average precipitation mm (inches)	10 (0.4)	10 (0.4)	12 (0.5)	27 (1.1)	94 (3.7)	153 (6.0)	206 (8.1)	190 (7.5)	179 (7.0)	120 (4.7)	54 (2.1)	39 (1.5)	1,094 (43)
Average rainy days	5.2	4.5	6.4	9.2	19.7	24.3	26.9	25.7	24.4	21.0	12.9	9.1	189.3
Source: Meteoblue

== Demographics ==
Population census of Ternate
Year	Pop.	±% p.a.
1903	2,460	—
1918	2,803	+0.87%
1939	4,082	+1.81%
1948	2,383	−5.80%
1960	5,345	+6.96%
1970	5,930	+1.04%
1975	6,593	+2.15%
1980	9,739	+8.11%
1990	11,981	+2.09%
1995	14,236	+3.28%
2000	17,179	+4.11%
2007	20,457	+2.44%
2010	19,297	−2.10%
2015	23,157	+3.53%
2020	24,653	+1.33%
2024	24,891	+0.23%
Source: Philippine Statistics Authority

In the 2024 census, the population of Ternate, Cavite, was 24,891 people, with a density of 420 inhabitants per square kilometre or 1,100 inhabitants per square mile.

=== Language ===
In addition to Tagalog, the community continue to use one of several Spanish-based creole varieties found in the Philippines, collectively known as Chabacano (Ternateño–Chavacano). Locals, however, simply call the vernacular language as Bahra.

=== Religion ===
Most Ternateños are Catholics, with the majority belonging to the Catholic Church, and the rest subscribing to other Christian denominations.

- Members Church of God International (MCGI)
- Philippine Independent Church (Aglipayan Church)
- Iglesia ni Cristo
- United Church of Christ in the Philippines
- Jehovah's Witnesses
- The Church of Jesus Christ of Latter-day Saints
- Assemblies of God
- Church of Alpha Omega Christian Ministries Inc.

A number of residents also profess Islam, belonging to the Sunni branch predominant in the country.

== Economy ==
Poverty incidence of Ternate

Source: Philippine Statistics Authority

== Government ==
=== Elected officials ===
The following are the elected officials of the town elected last May 12, 2025 which serves until 2028:

Position	Official
Mayor	Lamberto D. Bambao (NPC)
Vice Mayor	Calvin Kenneth C. Soberano (PMP)

Sangguniang Bayan Members	Party
Laurel Z. Lindo	NPC
Christian A. Bambao	NPC
Persival L. Garcia	Aksyon
Deonilo I. Bersamina	NPC
Charito S. Mojica	NPC
Romel G. Anit	NPC
Ryojie Y. Cachuela	NUP
John Karlou O. Leysico	PMP
ABC President
SK Federation President

== Education ==
The Ternate Schools District Office governs all educational institutions within the municipality. It oversees the management and operations of all private and public, from primary to secondary schools.

=== Primary and elementary schools ===
- Anastacio N.F. Dinglas Elementary School
- Parang Elementary School
- San Juan Elementary School
- Sapang Elementary School
- Ternate Central School

=== Secondary schools ===
- Ternate Integrated National High School
- Ternate West National High School

=== Higher educational institution ===
- Cavite West Point College
