= Hollow =

Hollow may refer to:

== Natural phenomena ==
- Hollow, a low, wooded area, such as a copse
- Hollow (landform), a small vee-shaped, riverine type of valley
- Tree hollow, a void in a branch or trunk, which may provide habitat for animals
- Hollows (Mercury)

== Arts, entertainment, and media ==
=== Fictional entities ===
- Hollow (Marvel Comics), a mutant formerly known as Penance
- Hollows, fictional beings in the manga and anime series Bleach; see List of Hollows in Bleach

=== Films ===
- Hollow: An Interactive Documentary, an American documentary film
- Hollow (2011 film), a British horror film
- Hollow (2014 film), a Vietnamese horror film
- Hollow (upcoming film), an upcoming American film

=== Literature ===
- Hollows (series), a series of novels and stories by Kim Harrison
- "The Legend of Sleepy Hollow", by Washington Irving

=== Music ===
- Hollow (band), a progressive power metal band from in Umeå, Sweden

==== Albums ====
- Hollow (album), by the Handsome Family, 2023
- Hollow (Digital Summer EP), 2008
- Hollow (Stray Kids EP), 2025
- Hollow, an album by Cesium_137, 2006
- Hollow, an album by Cut Off Your Hands, 2011

==== Songs ====
- "Hollow" (Alice in Chains song), 2013
- "Hollow" (Dons song), 2024
- "Hollow" (Godsmack song), 2006
- "Hollow" (Marshmello and Cameron Whitcomb song), 2026
- "Hollow" (Pantera song), 1992
- "Hollow" (Smash into Pieces song), 2026
- "Hollow" (Stray Kids song), 2025
- "Hollow" (Tori Kelly song), 2015
- "Hollow", by !!! from Strange Weather, Isn't It?, 2010
- "Hollow", by the 3rd and the Mortal from In This Room, 1997
- "Hollow", by Breaking Benjamin from Dark Before Dawn, 2015
- "Hollow", by Coldrain from The Enemy Inside, 2011
- "Hollow", by Cult of Luna from Cult of Luna, 2001
- "Hollow", by Darkest Hour from So Sedated, So Secure, 2001
- "Hollow", by D'espairsRay from Mirror, 2007
- "Hollow", by Edge of Sanity from Infernal, 1997
- "Hollow", by Fallujah from Undying Light, 2019
- "Hollow", by For the Fallen Dreams from Wasted Youth, 2012
- "Hollow", by Jelly Roll from Ballads of the Broken, 2021
- "Hollow", by Mayday Parade from Black Lines, 2015
- "Hollow", by Maisie Peters from You Signed Up For This, 2021
- "Hollow", by Norther from Death Unlimited, 2004
- "Hollow", by Parkway Drive from Deep Blue, 2010
- "Hollow", by Rivers of Nihil from Where Owls Know My Name, 2018
- "Hollow", by Submersed from In Due Time, 2004
- "Hollow", by Tesseract from One, 2011
- "Hollow", by Theatre of Tragedy from Forever Is the World, 2009
- "Hollow", by Threshold from Dead Reckoning, 2007
- "Hollow", by Björk from Biophilia, 2011
- "Hollow", by Turnover from Magnolia, 2013
- "Hollow", by Wage War from Blueprints, 2015
- "Hollow", by Within the Ruins from Black Heart, 2020
- "Hollow", theme song for the game Final Fantasy VII Remake, 2020

== See also ==
- Cavity (disambiguation)
- The Hollow (disambiguation)
- Sleepy Hollow (disambiguation)
