= Cavite (disambiguation) =

Cavite is a province in the Philippines.

Cavite may also refer to:

- Cavite City
- Cavite Peninsula
- Cavite (film)
- Naval Base Cavite, officially Naval Station Pascual Ledesma, and also known as Cavite Naval Base or Cavite Navy Yard

== See also ==
- Cavity (disambiguation)
