= The Hollow (disambiguation) =

The Hollow is a 1946 detective novel by Agatha Christie.

The Hollow may also refer to:

- The Hollow (play), a 1951 play by Agatha Christie
- The Hollow (Charmed), a fictional entity in the television series Charmed

== Film and television ==
- The Hollow (1975 film), a documentary film by George Nierenberg
- The Hollow (2004 film), a teen horror film
- The Hollow (2015 film), a TV horror film
- The Hollow (2016 film), a crime drama film
- The Hollow (TV series), a Netflix original series from 2018

== Literature ==
- "The Hollow Men", a poem by T. S. Eliot

== Music ==
- "The Hollow" (song), a 2000 song by A Perfect Circle
- The Hollow (album), a 2011 album by Memphis May Fire

== Places ==
- The Hollow (Markham, Virginia), an historic property and dwelling near Markham, Fauquier County, Virginia
- The Hollow, Bridgeport, a neighborhood in the city of Bridgeport

== See also ==
- Hollow (disambiguation)
