= Cavatelli =

Type of pasta

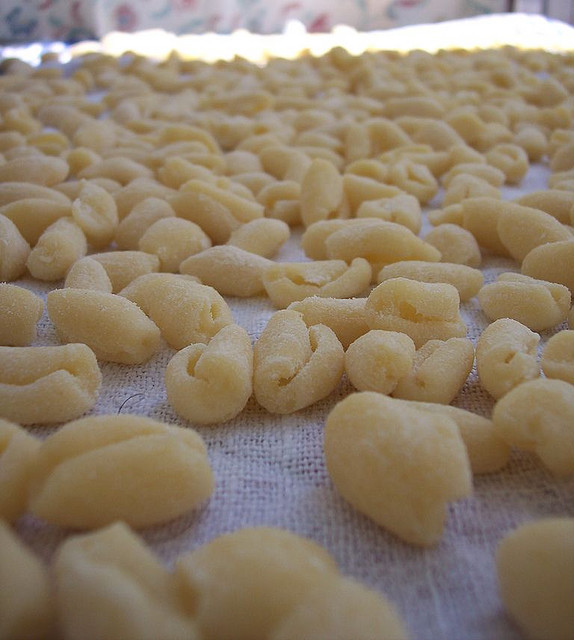
- Uncooked cavatelli
- Type: Pasta
- Place of origin: Italy
- Region or state: Abruzzo; Molise; Apulia
- Main ingredients: Durum wheat

Cavatelli (Note: English: /ˌkævəˈtɛli/ KAV-ə-TEL-ee, US also /ˌkɑːv-/ KAHV-, Italian: [kavaˈtɛlli]; lit. 'little hollows'; cognate to English cave and cavity.) are small pasta shells made from semolina or other flour dough, commonly cooked with garlic and broccoli or rapini, or simply with tomato sauce. A variant adds ricotta cheese to the dough mix.

Many varieties and local names of cavatelli exist, including gnocchetti, manatelli, orecchie di prete (lit. 'priest's ears'), strascinati, truoccoli; capunti, cingule, minuich, rascatelli, zinnezinne (Basilicata); cantaroggini, cavatieddi, cecatelli/cicatelli, cecatidde, cortecce (lit. 'tree barks', Salerno), mignuicchi, strascenate, tagghjunghele (Apulia and Campania); pincinelle (Marche); cavatielle, 'ncatenate, cazzarille, ciufele (Molise); cavasuneddi, cavatuneddi, gnucchitti, gnocculi (Sicily), and pizzicarieddi (Apulia).

A particular variety of cavatelli is typical of the comune (municipality) of Teggiano, in Campania, where they are referred to as parmitieddi. Parmitieddi are larger than cavatelli and flat-shaped. They are obtained by rolling a stick dough with three fingers of one hand, instead of with a single finger as done for the common cavatelli. Parmitieddi are usually served as a first course on Palm Sunday because their shape, similar to that of a tree leaf, recalls that of a palm. In Campania, they are most common in the city of Benevento.

Cavatelli with a softer texture are produced by boiling water before it is added to flour.

== Gallery ==
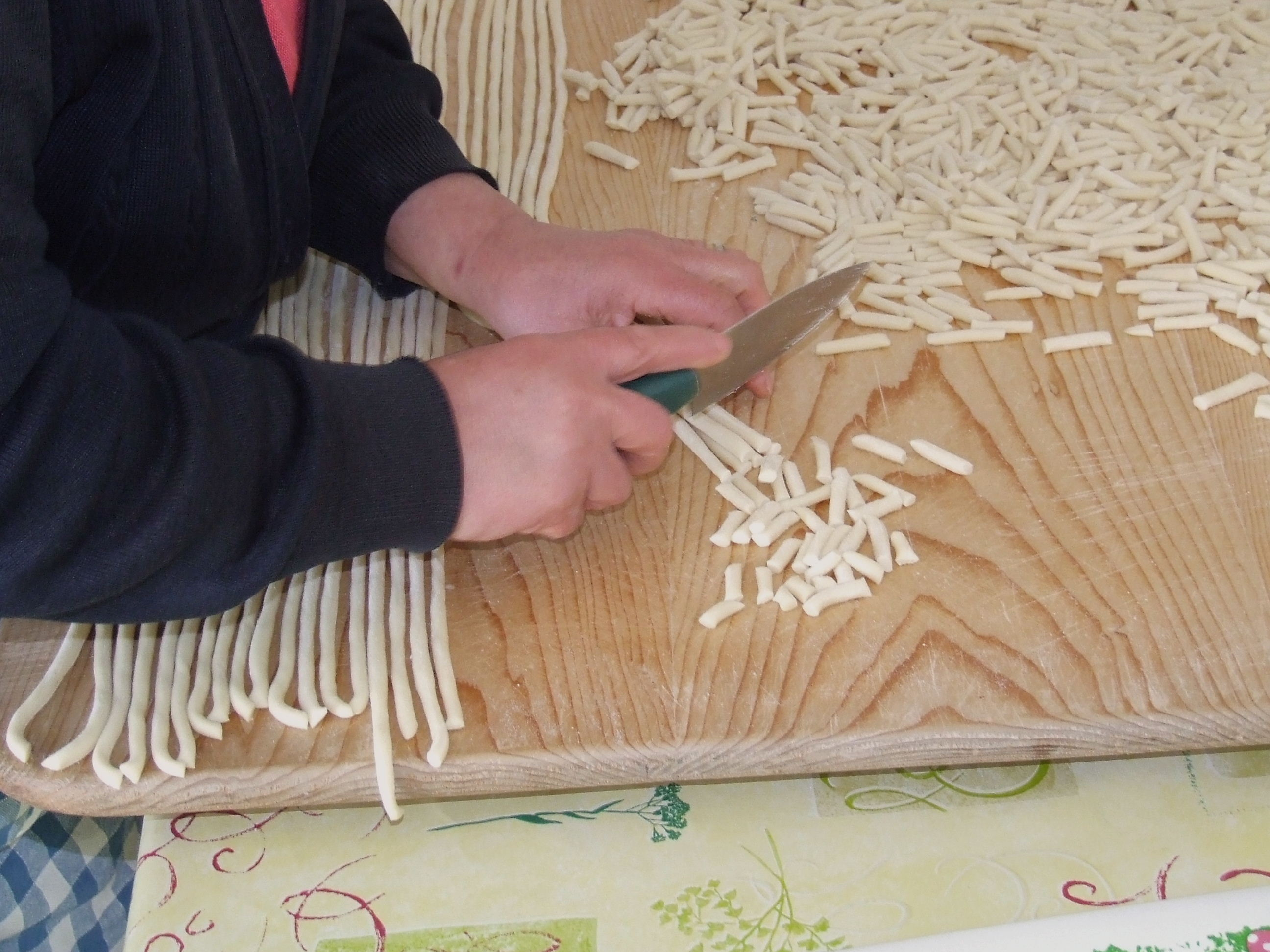
Cutting cavatelli into pieces

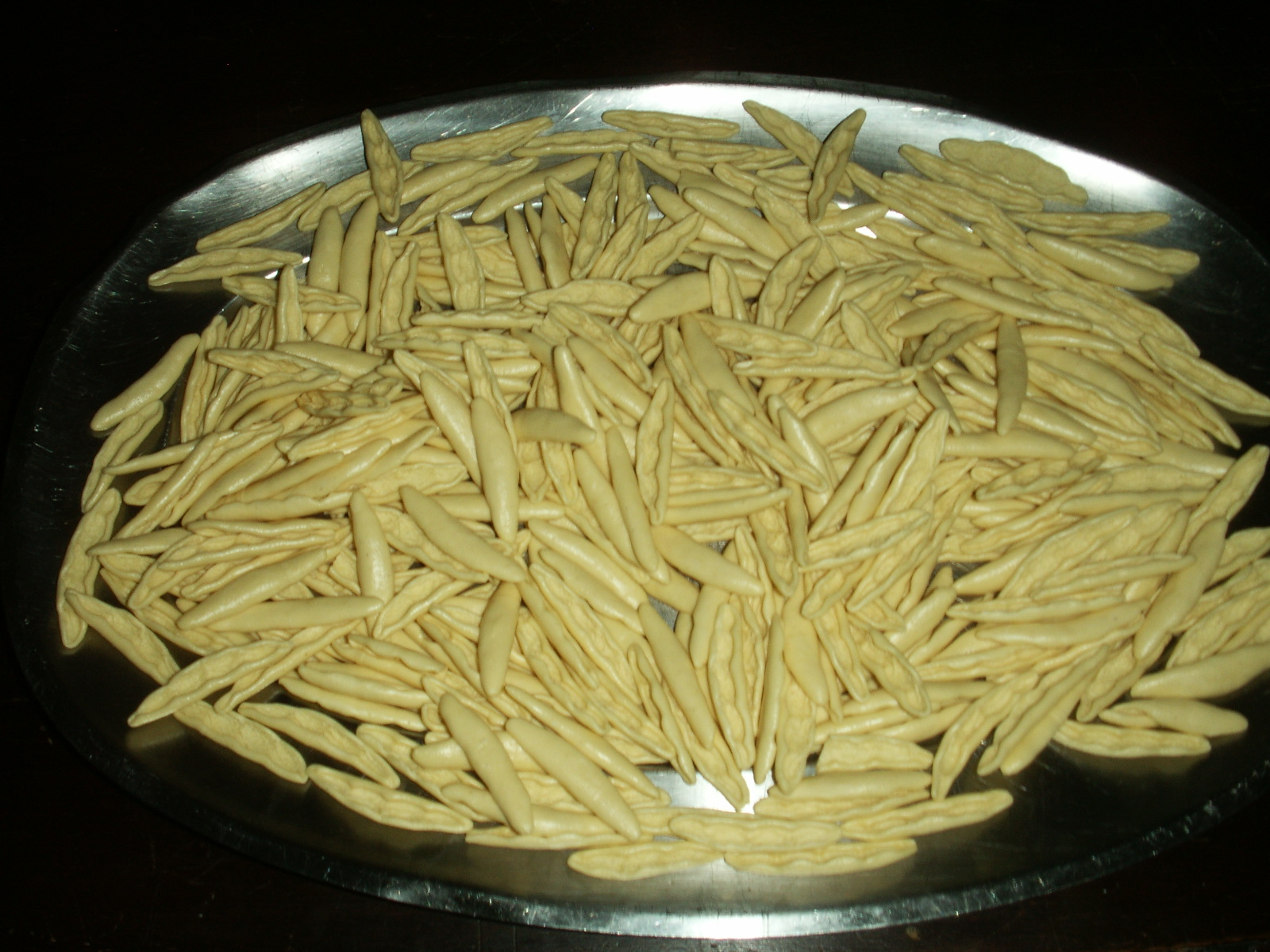
Dry capunti, a variety of cavatelli from Apulia

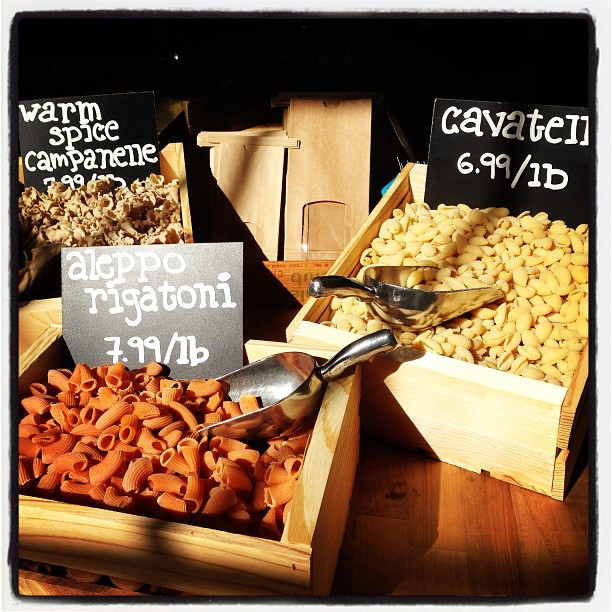
Cavatelli for sale

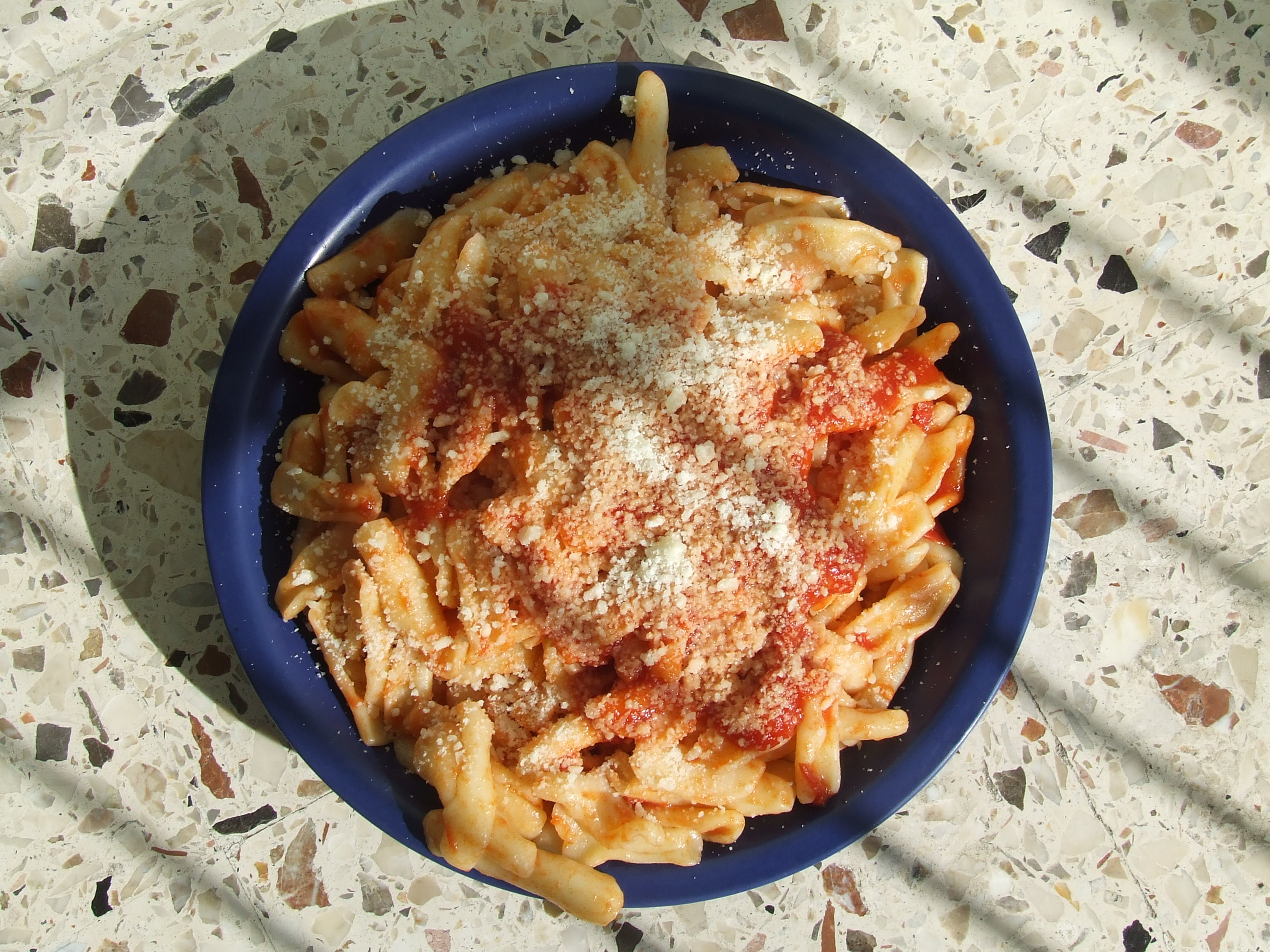
A dish of cavatelli

== See also ==
Media related to Cavatelli at Wikimedia Commons

- List of pasta
