= Parmitieddi =

Type of pasta

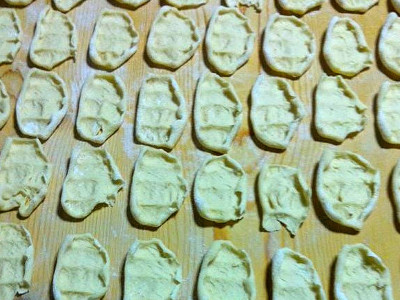
- Uncooked parmitieddi
- Alternative names: Parmi, parmatieddi
- Type: Pasta
- Place of origin: Italy
- Region or state: Campania

Parmitieddi (Italian: [parmiˈtjɛddi]), also known as parmi or parmatieddi, is a variety of cavatelli typical of Teggiano, a comune (municipality) in the Campania region of Italy. Parmitieddi is larger than cavatelli and flat-shaped. They are made by rolling a stick of dough with the three fingers of one hand and are usually eaten as a first course on Palm Sunday served with ragù sauce and grated pecorino or ricotta salata cheese. Their shape is similar to that of a palm leaf. The name refers to either the method of preparation with the palm of one's hand (palma in Italian) or the fact that it is eaten on Palm Sunday.

== See also ==
- List of pasta
