= Cavity =

Cavity may refer to:

== Biology and healthcare ==
- Body cavity, a fluid-filled space in many animals where organs typically develop
  - Gastrovascular cavity, the primary organ of digestion and circulation in cnidarians and flatworms
- Dental cavity or tooth decay, damage to the structure of a tooth
- Lung cavity, an air-filled space within the lung
- Nasal cavity, a large, air-filled space above and behind the nose in the middle of the face

== Radio frequency resonance ==
- Microwave cavity or RF cavity, a cavity resonator in the radio frequency range, for example used in particle accelerators
- Optical cavity, the cavity resonator of a laser
- Resonant cavity, a device designed to select for waves of particular wavelengths

== Other uses ==
- Cavity (band), a sludge metal band from Miami, Florida
- Cavity method, a mathematical method to solve some mean field type of models
- Cavity wall, a wall consisting of two skins with a cavity

== See also ==
- Cavitation, the phenomenon of partial vacuums forming in fluid, for example, in propellers
- Cavitary pneumonia, a type of pneumonia in which a hole is formed in the lung
- Cavite (disambiguation)
- Cavity Search (disambiguation)
- Hollow (disambiguation)
