= Mercedes Matias-Santiago =

Filipino soprano and music educator (1910–2003)

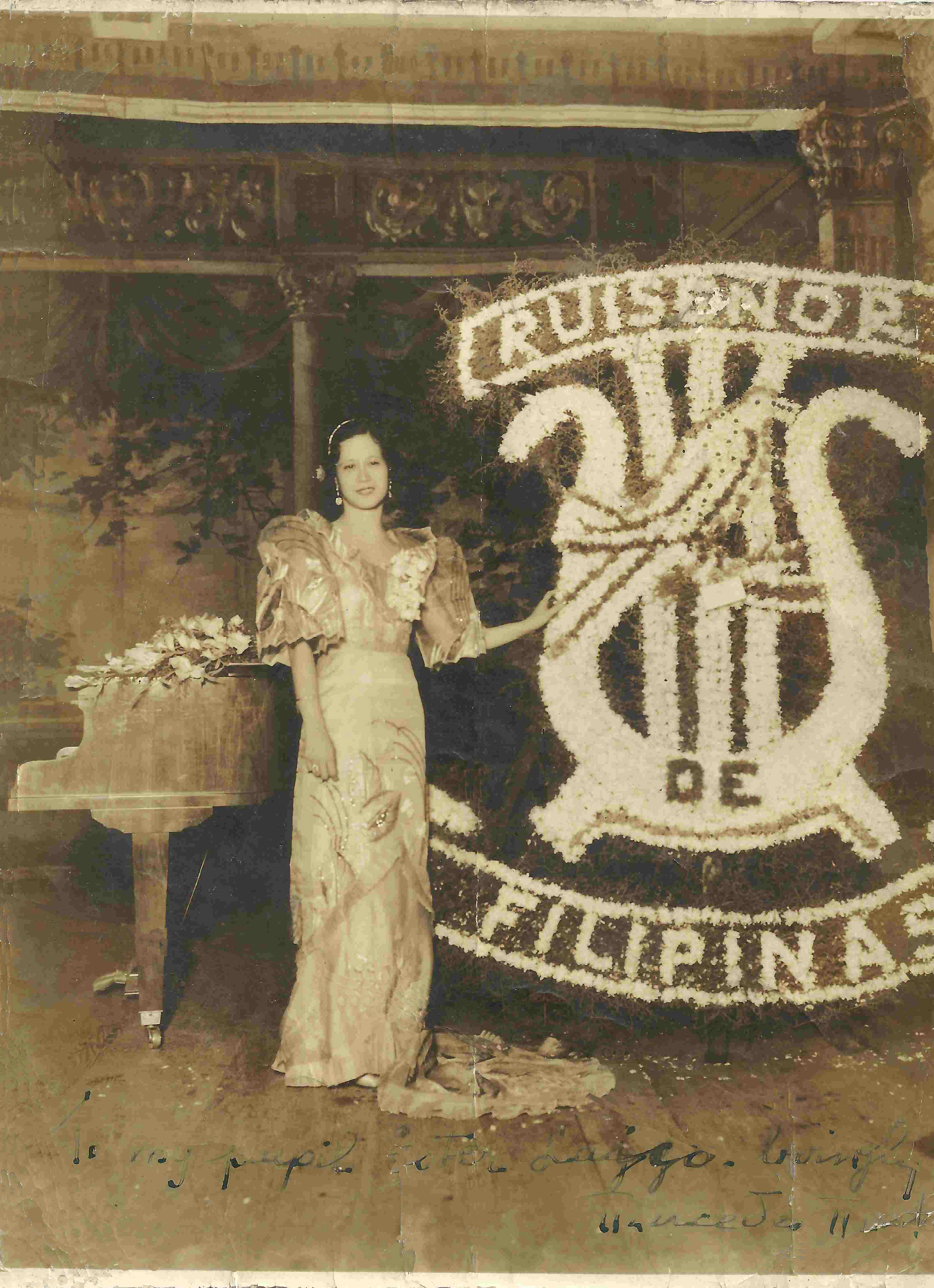
- Matias Santiango around 1936
- Born: Mercedes Matias; March 4, 1910; San Roque, Cavite, Philippine Islands, United States
- Died: June 20, 2003 (aged 93); Sampaloc, Manila, Philippines
- Occupation: Philippines

Mercedes Matias Santiago (March 4, 1910 – June 20, 2003) was a Filipino soprano and music educator.

== Early life ==
Born Mercedes Matias on March 4, 1910 in Cavite City, Cavite, Philippines, she was one of three children of Juan Matias of Ligao, Albay and Rosario Regalado of Cavite City. Her father worked as a division head at the U.S. Navy yards in Cavite. (Guerrero 2002, p. Q14)

Matias grew up surrounded by opera music and she and her family regularly attended performances at the Manila Grand Opera House. From this inspiration, she showed early promise as a soprano. After attending public schools in her home town, she moved to Manila to study under Maestro Victorino Carrion and the Englishwoman Kay Williams, both of whom were prominent music instructors in the Philippine capital. (Bañas 1935, p. 556 and Villaruz 2006, pp. 77–78)

== Career ==
=== Italy ===
In 1928, Matias travelled to Milan in order to further her voice training. Her father sold three property lots to pay for her expenses. (Guerrero 2002, p. Q14) She was the third Filipino classical singer, after Isang Tapales and Jovita Fuentes, to leave the country to pursue further studies abroad. Matias stayed in Italy from 1928 to 1932 and during this time took part in opera performances in Turin, Venice and Milan. She performed in concerts for the benefit of Milan's fascists and on one occasion, had the distinction of singing before Italian dictator Benito Mussolini. (Guerrero 2002, p. Q14)

There are two differing accounts of Mercedes Matias' first performance in a leading role in Italy. According to one commentator, she debuted as Gilda in Verdi's opera Rigoletto at Turin's Teatro Comunale in 1929. (Tariman 2003, p. D2 and Tariman 2009) Another source states that she debuted in the same role in 1931, at the Teatro Dolverne in Milan. (Guerrero 2002, p. Q14) In addition to these performances, Matias sang the lead female role in Rigoletto in Venice as well as similar lead roles in Lucia di Lammermoor, La Sonnambula and Il barbiere di Siviglia in Milan.

=== Fame in the Philippines ===
After her return to the Philippines, Matias performed as a coloratura soprano at the Manila Grand Opera House, which she had frequented as a child, as well as at the new Manila Metropolitan Theater. She reprised several of the roles she had performed in Italy, including that of Lucia in Lucia di Lammermoor. She was also one of the first Filipinas to sing Verdi's Traviata. Indeed, during the 1930s and 1940s, she was the number one interpreter of both operas in the Philippines. (Tariman 2009)

Matias was a popular radio performer as well. Readers and radio listeners who participated in a contest run by the Philippine magazine Graphic in 1934 - which garnered more than 16,000 ballots - voted her number two among the best classical singers appearing on radio in the Philippines, behind Anita Galan. (Enriquez 2008, p. 106)

A high point in Mercedes Matias' career occurred after she performed the role of Anina in Bellini's opera La Sonnambula, when Philippine Commonwealth President Manuel L. Quezon sent her a seven-foot (two-meter) bouquet with an inscription that read Ruiseñor de Filipinas (Nightingale of the Philippines). (Tariman 2009) For that performance, she was accompanied by the Manila Symphony Orchestra (MSO). In all, Matias appeared as a vocal soloist with the MSO in 1933, 1936, 1947 and 1952.

Following one of her performances in 1948, the Manila Chronicle wrote: "As in other cities abroad where the presentation of higher types of music is part of community life, the cosmopolitan population of Manila jammed the UST Gym to listen, look and applaud Mercedes Matias Santiago as the country's one and only Lucia di Lammermoor. The audience headed by President Manuel A. Roxas gave Santiago thunderous ovations that implied their approval." (quoted in Tariman 2003, p. D2)

=== Teacher ===
Besides singing professionally, Mercedes Matias taught voice culture at the University of the Philippines' Conservatory of Music in the 1930s and later served briefly as an instructor in the Music Department at St. Paul College in Manila in 1943 before it was occupied by Japanese soldiers. After the war, she taught at the University of Santo Tomas Conservatory as well as in private schools. Her list of distinguished pupils included Dalisay Aldaba, Conchita Gaston, Enya Gonzalez, Remedios Bosch Jimenez, Luz Morales, Consuelo Salazar and Catalina Zandueta, as well as presidential wives Aurora Quezon and Imelda Marcos. (Cornejo 1939, p. 1936 and Guerrero 2002, p. Q14)

== Personal life ==
According to a contemporary source, Mercedes Matias married Gerónimo Santiago Jr., son of former Manila city councillor Gerónimo Santiago Sr. and Ildefensa Cichangco, in 1936. (Cornejo 1939, p. 1936) However, according to marriage registration records, they were only officially wedded eight years later, on February 19, 1944, at the Catholic Church in Sampaloc, Manila. The marriage contract indicated that both bride and groom were single and 33 years old. This marriage subsequently broke down and the couple separated, principally because Matias-Santiago could not have children. (Tariman 2009)

In the 1950s, Matias-Santiago began a romantic relationship with one of her students, the tenor Aristeo Velasco. As a leading Philippine music commenter later wrote, theirs "was a case of love ignited and intensified by music".(Tariman 2009) Velasco left his wife to live with Matias-Santiago, causing a scandal in the Philippines and irreparable harm to her career. As a result, she lost her teaching position and earned a living by giving private lessons.

== Later years ==
Matias-Santiago continued to give voice lessons for many years in her rented two-storey apartment and studio located at no. 1081 Maceda Street in Sampaloc, Metro Manila, where she and Aristeo Velasco resided. 'The Maestra', as she was known, taught music altogether for 70 years. (Tariman 2003, p. D2)

Forgotten by most Filipinos and passed over for major awards, Matias-Santiago nonetheless continued to have her supporters. In a biographical article entitled "A Neglected Living Treasure", which appeared in the Sunday Inquirer Magazine in 2002, she told an interviewer: "My life is something like the opera 'Lucia de Lammermoor'... It's a little sad, a little tragic and a little romantic." (Guerrero 2002, p. Q14)

Mercedes Matias-Santiago died during the afternoon of June 20, 2003, at the age of 93. Her partner Aristeo Velasco predeceased her.

== Additional sources ==
Bañas, Raymundo C. (1935). "Maestro Victorino Carrion, 1872-1935". Philippine Magazine, 32 (January 1935).

Carrion, Carmita L. (1958). "The Manila Symphony Society: 1926-1958", Philippine Studies, 6 (1).

Cornejo, Miguel R., compiler and editor (1939). Cornejo's Commonwealth Directory of the Philippines (1939 edition). Miguel R. Cornejo (publisher).

Enriquez, Elizabeth L. (2008). Appropriation of Colonial Broadcasting: A History of Early Radio in the Philippines, 1922-1946. University of the Philippines Press.

FamilySearch. "Philippines, Manila, Civil Registration, 1899-1984," online database with images.

Guerrero, Amadis Maria (2002). "A Neglected Living Treasure", Sunday Inquirer Magazine, 12 May 2002.

Tariman, Pablo (2003). "Mercedes Matias Santiago, last of the great divas", Philippine Daily Inquirer, 23 June 2003.

Tariman, Pablo (2009). "The Maestra and Her Young Tenor", Sunday Inquirer Magazine, 8 February 2009.

Villaruz, Basilio Esteban S. (2006). Treading Through: 45 Years of Philippine Dance. University of the Philippines Press.
