= Cavity Search =

Cavity Search may refer to:

- Body cavity search, a visual search or a manual internal inspection of body cavities for prohibited material (contraband), such as illegal drugs, money, or weapons
- Cavity Search Records, an independent record label based out of Portland, Oregon
- "Cavity Search" (song), the third track on the "Weird Al" Yankovic album Bad Hair Day
