= The Hollow, Bridgeport =

The Hollow
- Neighborhood of Bridgeport
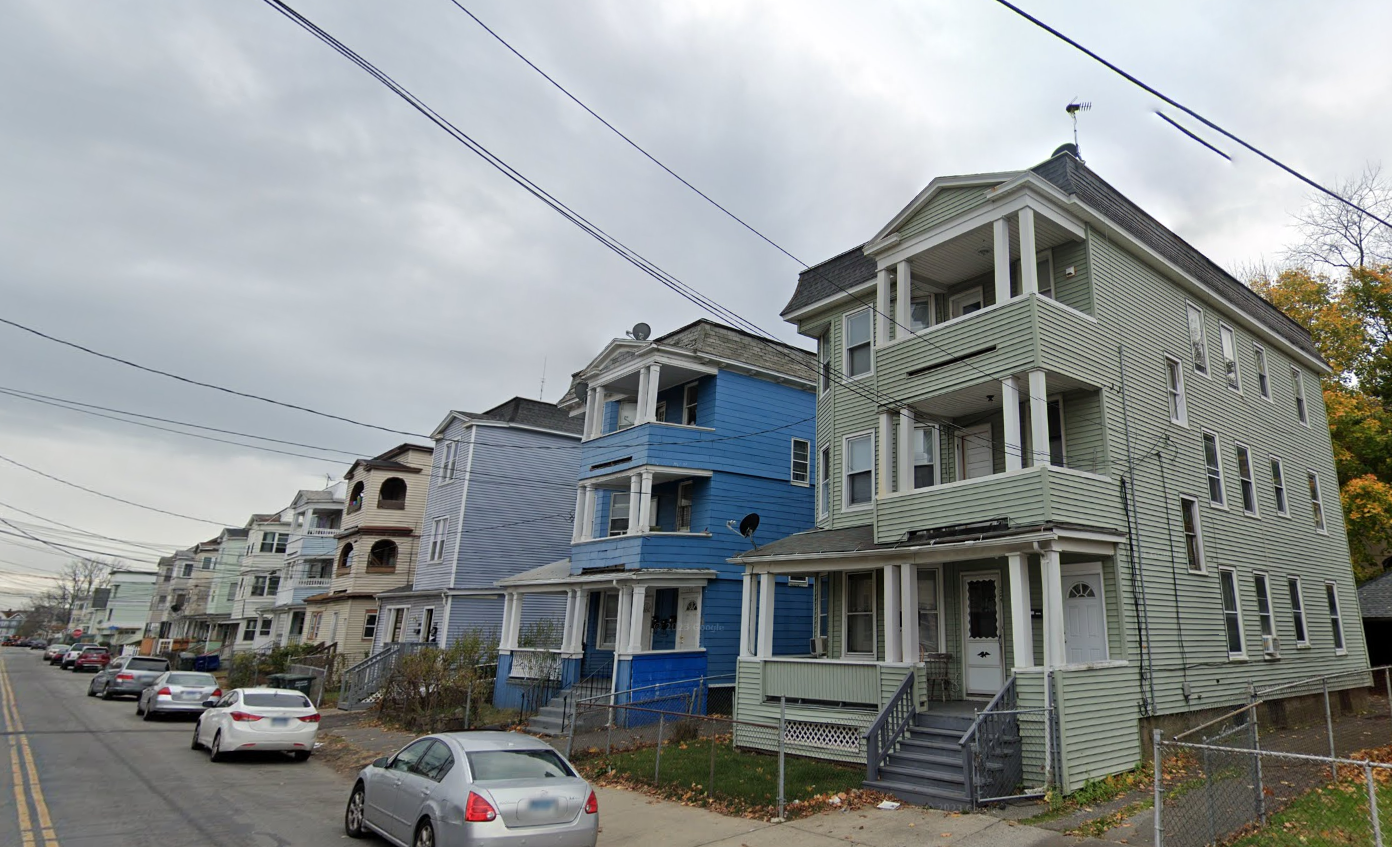
- Grant Street

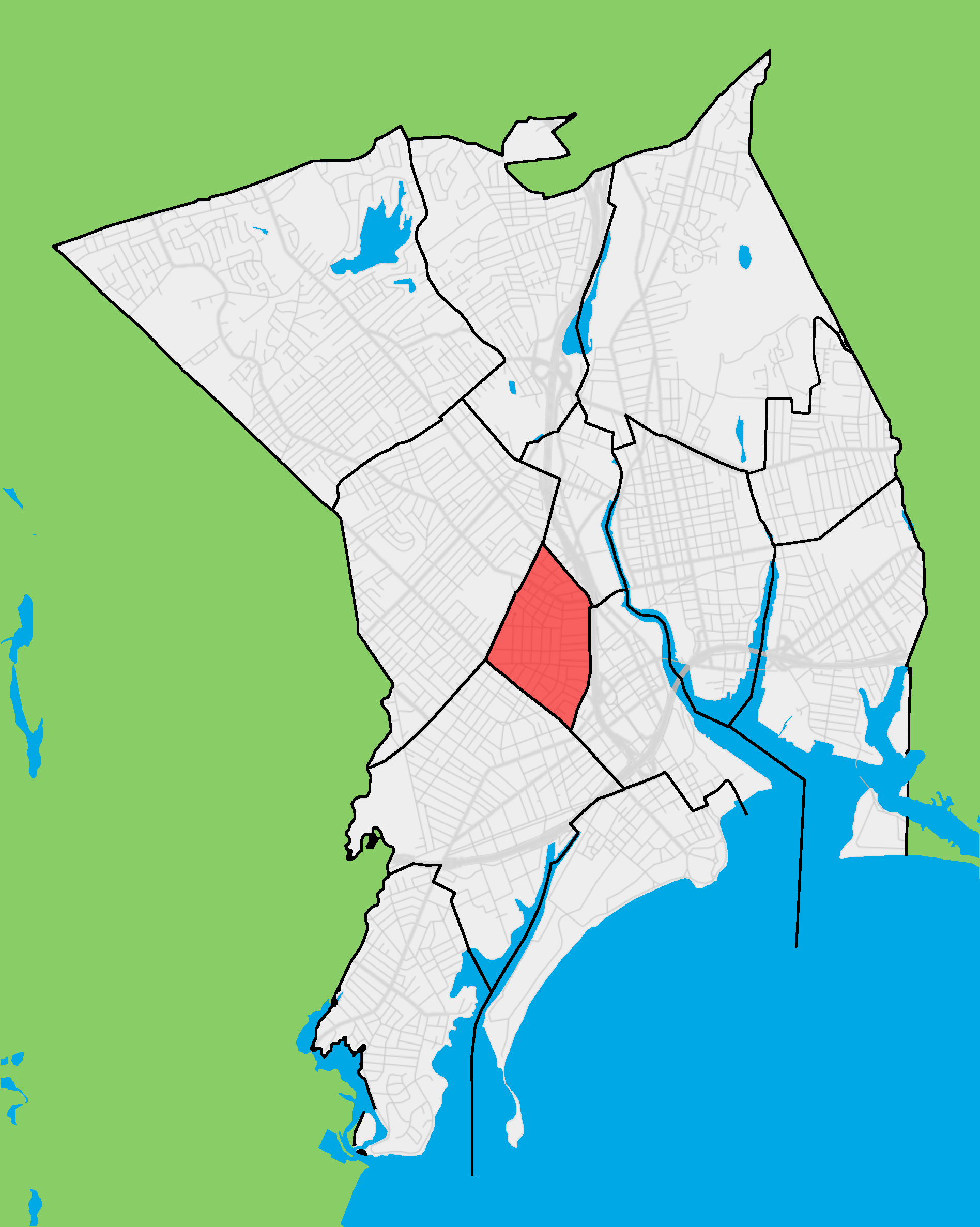
- The Hollow within Bridgeport
- Coordinates: 41°19′16″N 72°54′25″W
- Country: United States
- State: Connecticut
- City: Bridgeport

The Hollow is a neighborhood in the city of Bridgeport, Connecticut. The neighborhood is the most densely populated in the city. The neighborhood has been home to immigrants throughout its history. Approximately 30 percent of residents of the Hollow are foreign born. Sterling Hill Historic District is located in the neighborhood. The overall housing in the neighborhood is multi-family residential. The neighborhood is home to two public schools, Geraldine Johnson and Columbus school. Originally settled by Irish and English immigrants in the late 1830s, today 30% of the area's people are foreign born, and is home to Portuguese, Cape Verdean and Brazilian populations, as well as the population being 44% Hispanic.

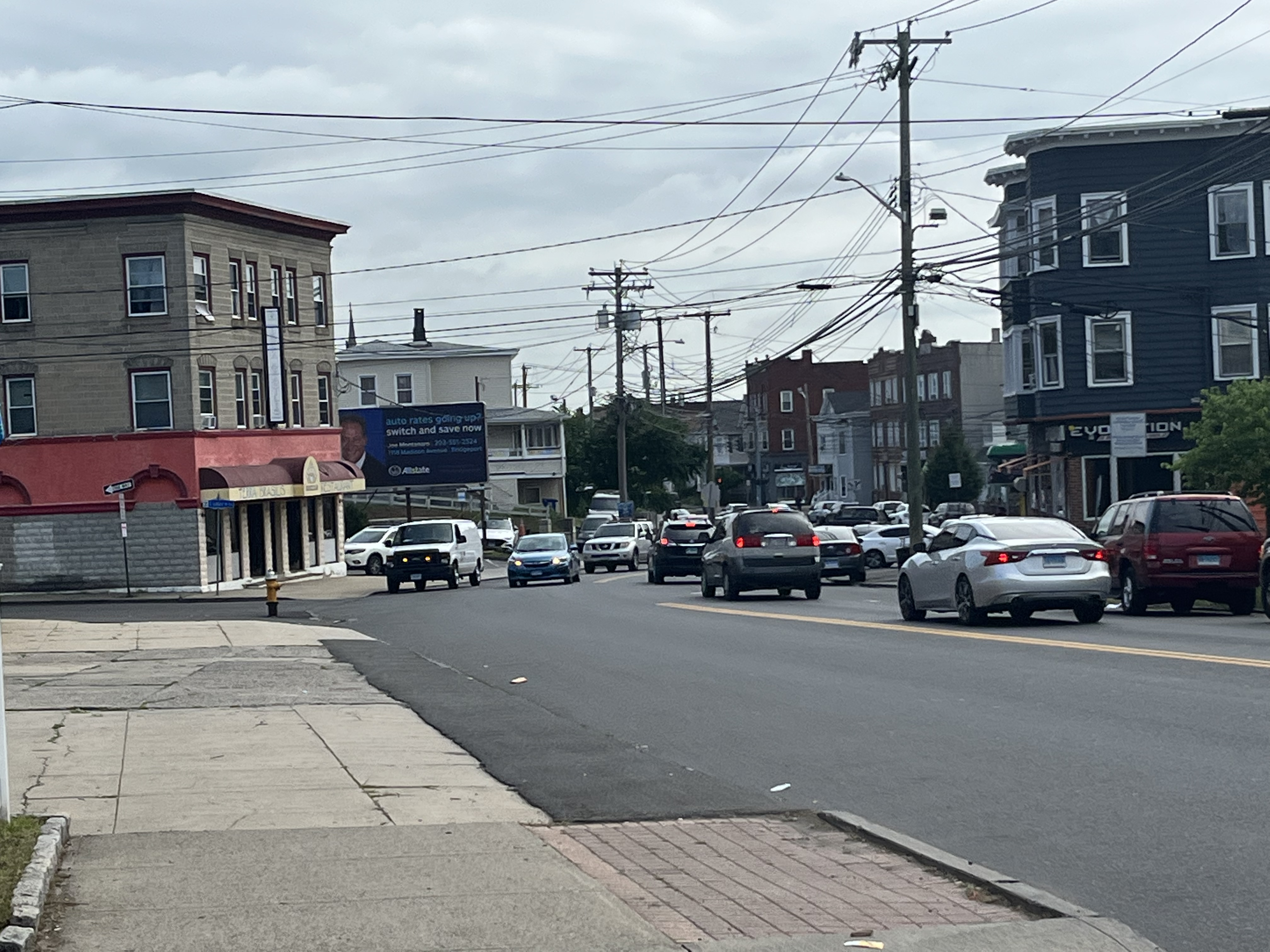
Brazilian churrascaria restaurants along North Avenue, facing northeast towards Main Street, the Hollow, Bridgeport
