= Cavite City =

Component city in Cavite, Philippines

- Component city
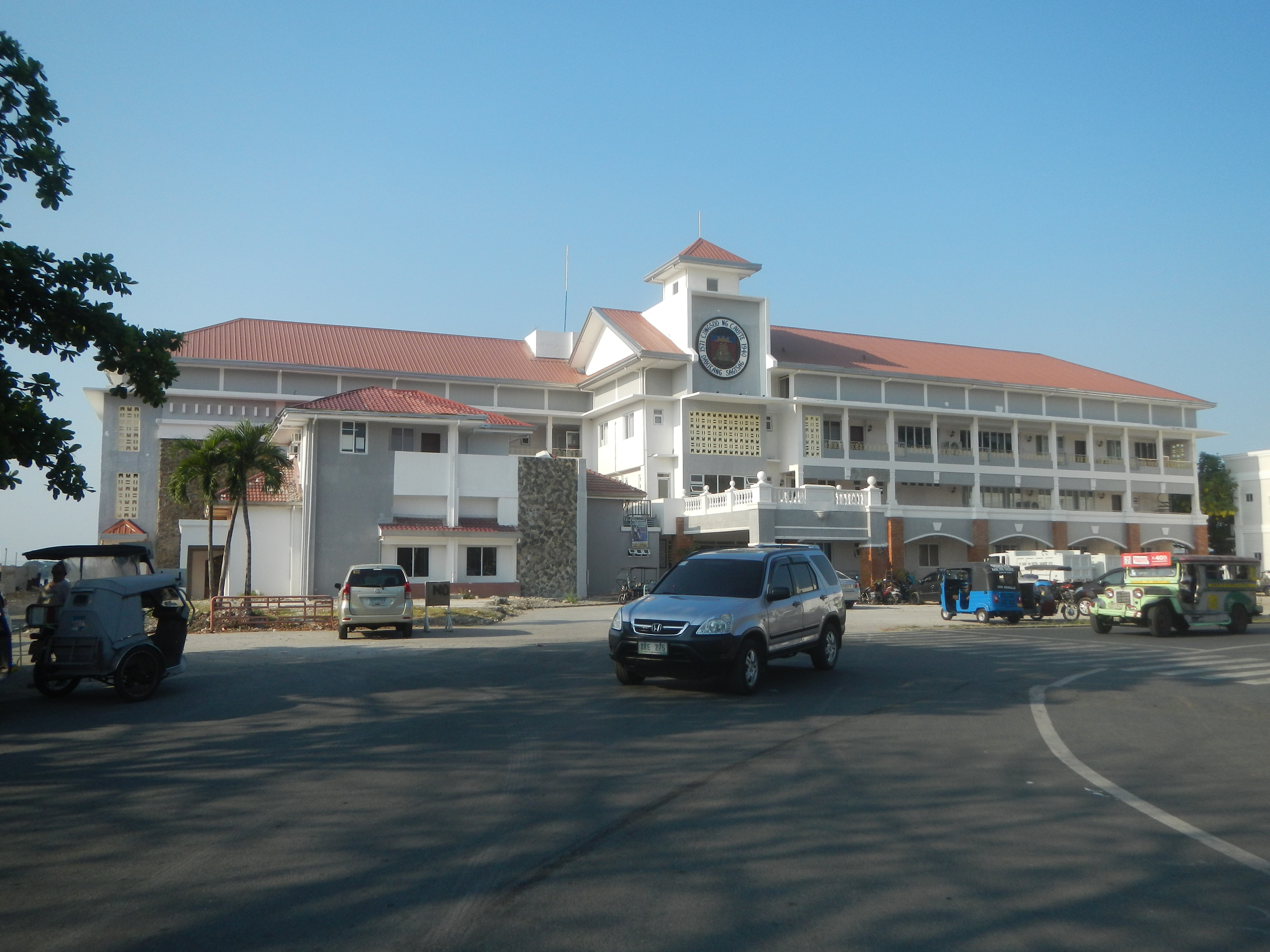
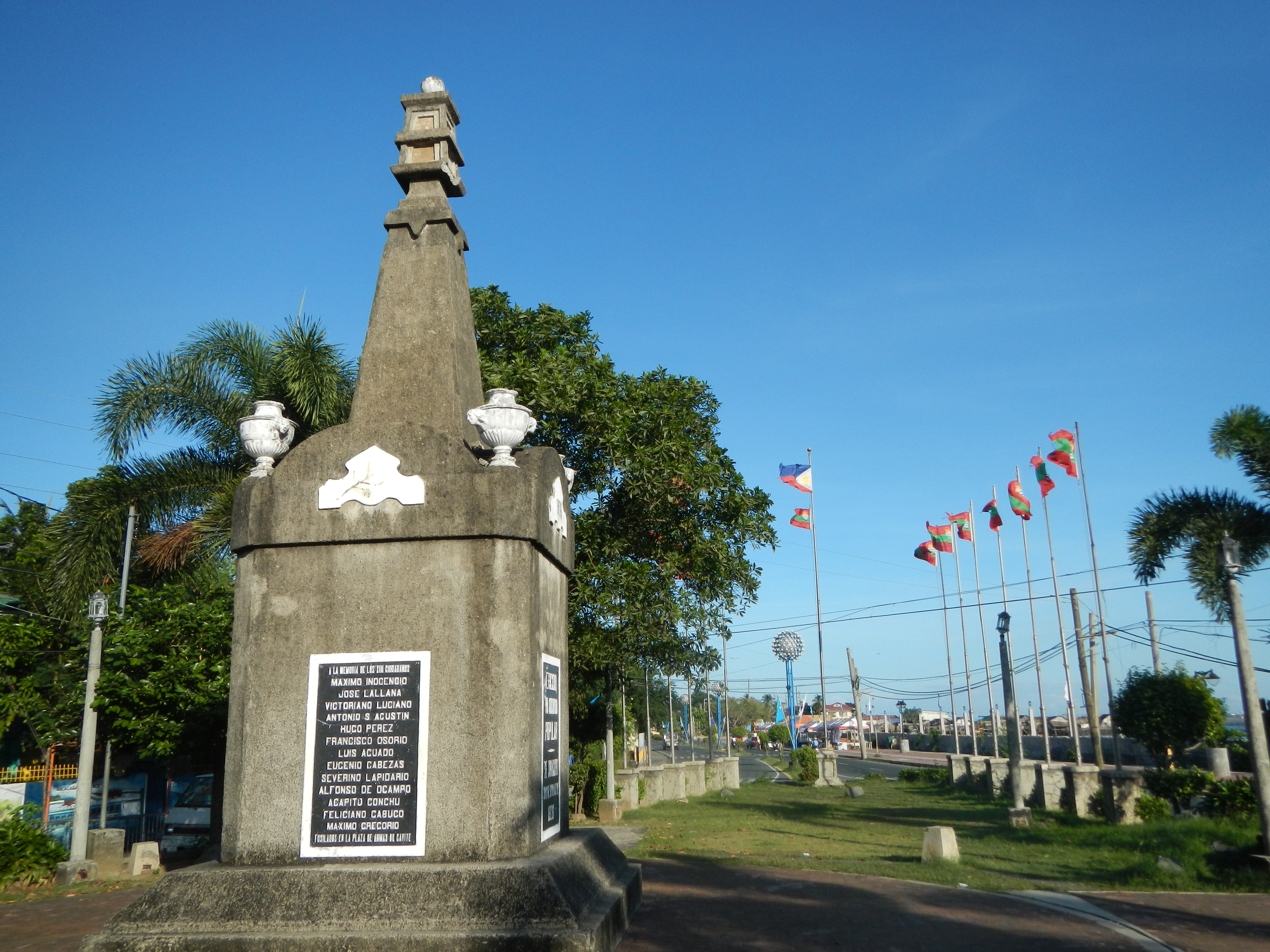
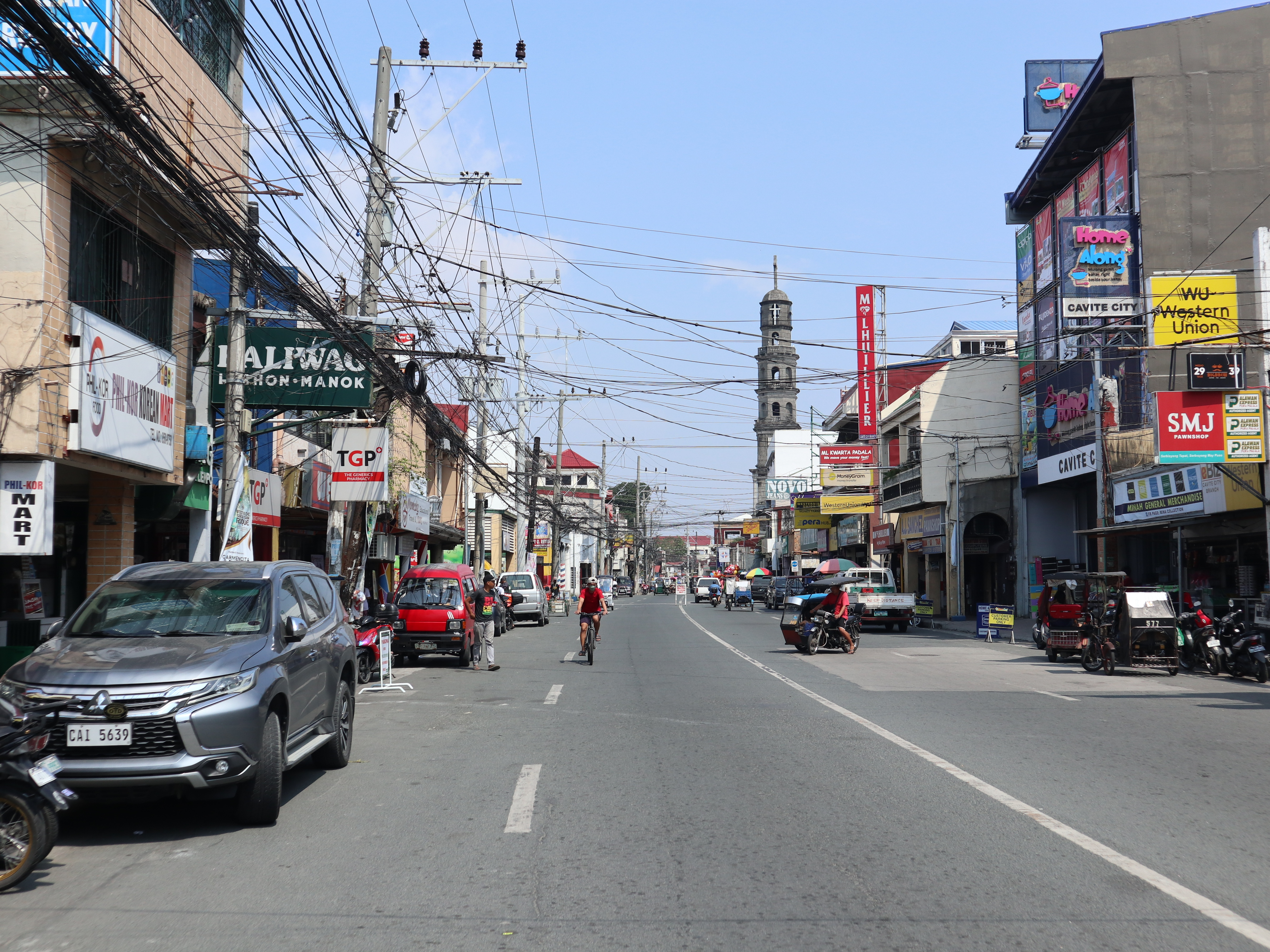
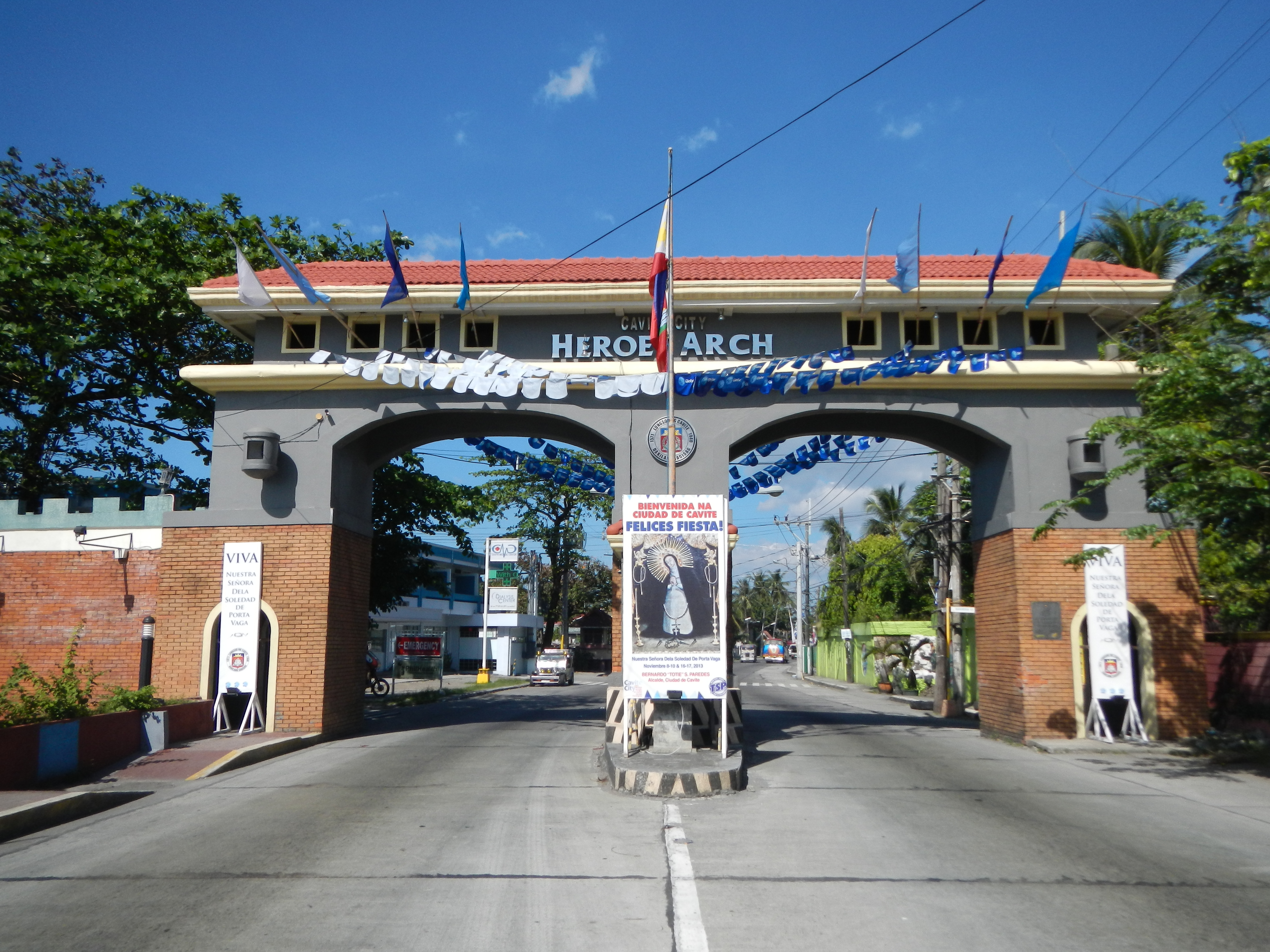
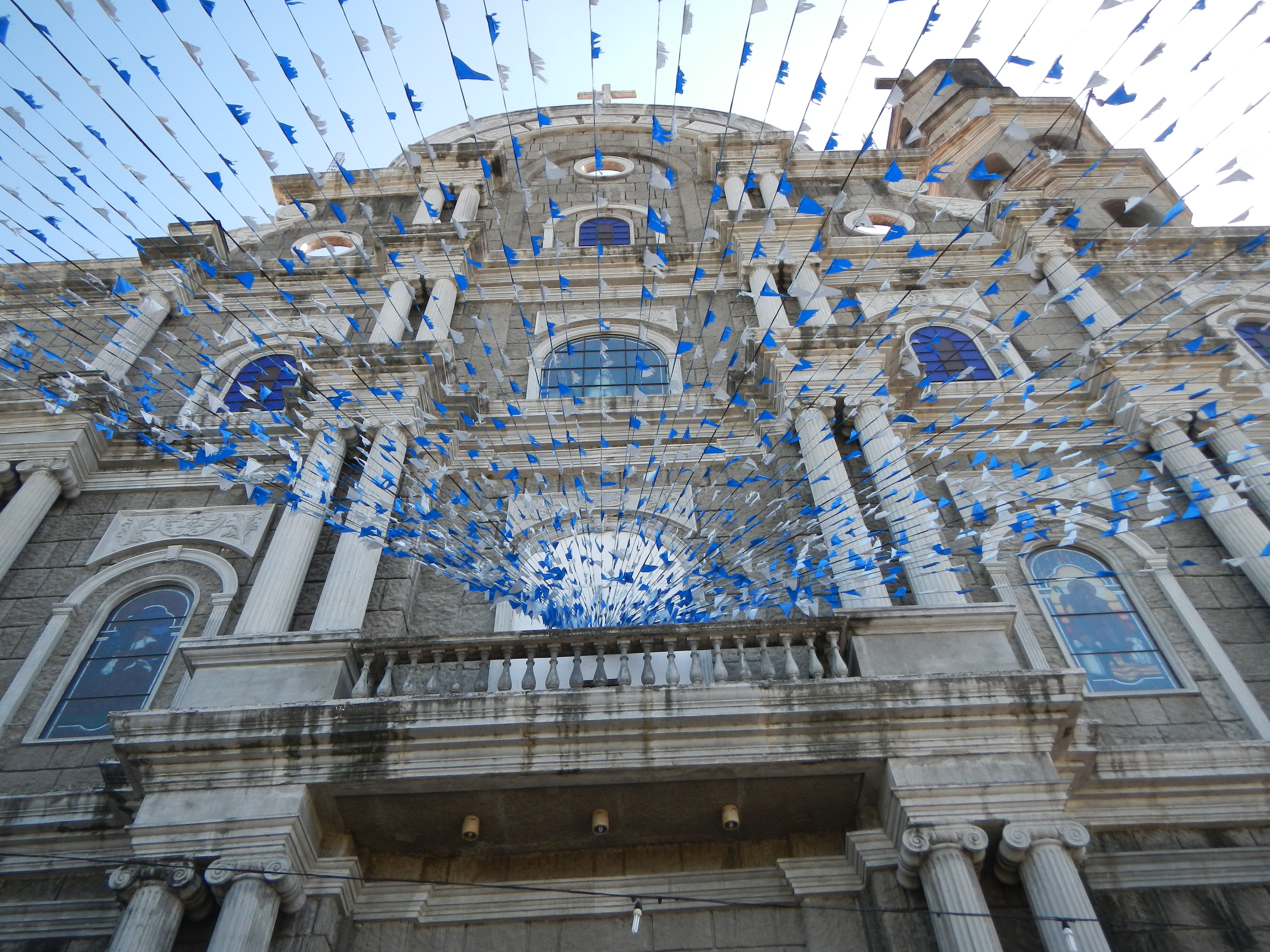
- Clockwise from top: New Cavite City Hall, City Proper, San Roque Parish Church, Heroes' Arch, and the Thirteen Martyrs Monument

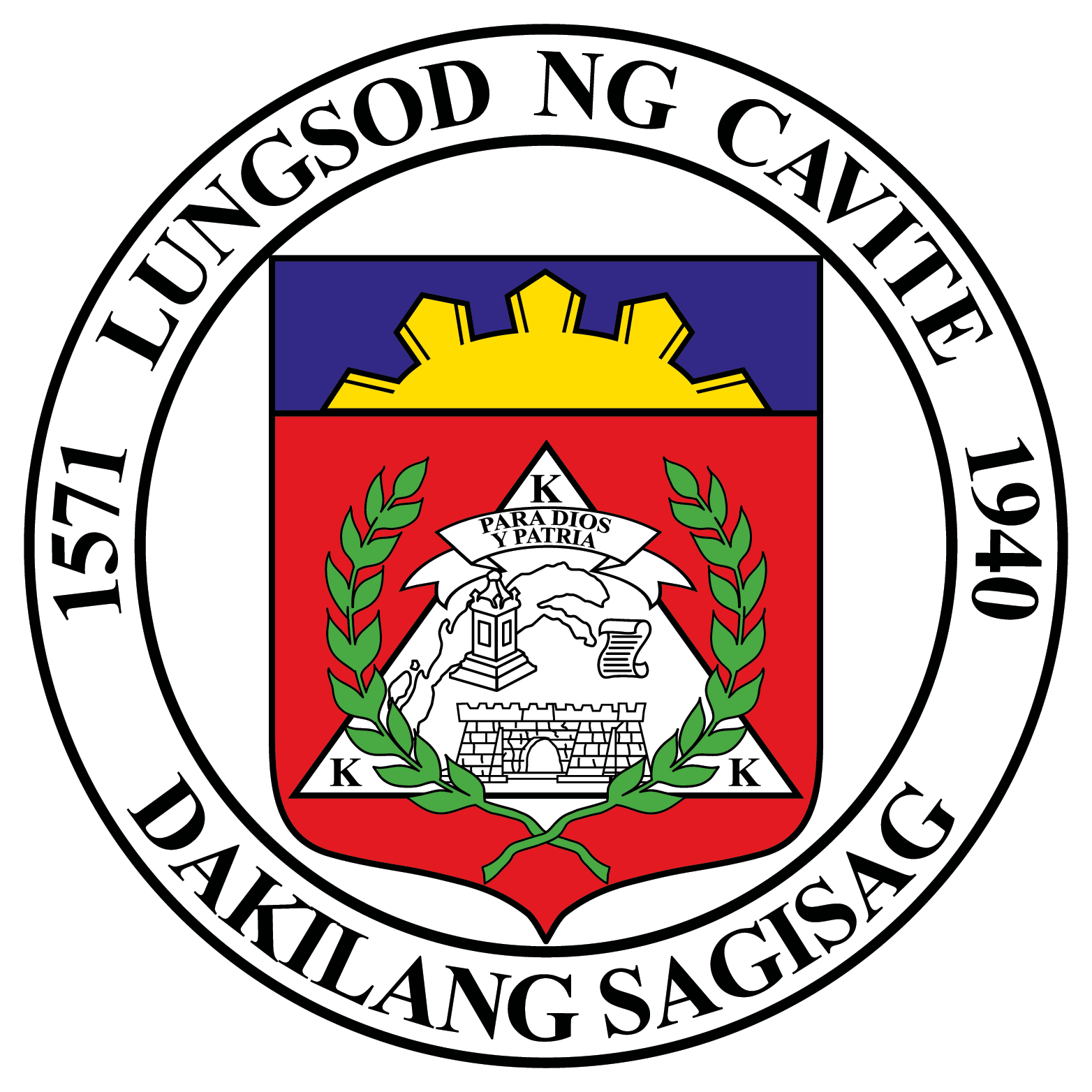
- Flag Seal
- Nicknames: The Historic City by the Bay
- Motto: Para Dios y Patria ("For God and Country")
- Map of Cavite with Cavite City highlighted
- Interactive map of Cavite City
- Location within the Philippines
- Coordinates: 14°29′N 120°54′E
- Country: Philippines
- Region: Calabarzon
- Province: Cavite
- District: 1st district
- Settled: May 16, 1571
- Founded: 1614
- Cityhood: September 7, 1940
- Barangays: 84 (see Barangays)

Government
  - Type: Sangguniang Panlungsod
  - Mayor: Denver Christopher Reyes Chua
  - Vice Mayor: Benzen Raleigh G. Rusit
  - Representative: Ramon Jolo Revilla
  - City Council: Members: Maureen E. Lu; Aeign Zackrey Nash V. Aguas; Edmund C. Tirona; Renan L. Montoya; Marrian M. Pinzon; Eduardo G. Novero Jr.; Franklin A. Nuguid; Jesus Jet S. Barrera II; Marc Lawrence D. Serrano; Mark Anthony A. Amparo
  - Electorate: 69,630 voters (2025)

Area
  - Total: 10.89 km^{2} (4.20 sq mi)
  - Rank: 143rd out of 145
- Elevation: 15 m (49 ft)
- Highest elevation: 169 m (554 ft)
- Lowest elevation: 0 m (0 ft)

Population (2024 census)
  - Total: 98,673
  - Density: 9,061/km^{2} (23,470/sq mi)
  - Households: 27,473

Economy
  - Income class: 4th city income class
  - Poverty incidence: 11.91% (2023)
  - Revenue: ₱ 757.8 million (2024)
  - Assets: ₱ 1,962 million (2024)
  - Expenditure: ₱ 403.4 million (2024)
  - Liabilities: ₱ 339.5 million (2024)

Service provider
  - Electricity: Manila Electric Company (Meralco)
- Time zone: UTC+8 (PST)
- ZIP code: 4100, 4101, 4125
- PSGC: 042105000
- IDD : area code: +63 (0)46
- Native languages: Chavacano; Tagalog
- Major religions: Roman Catholicism; Aglipayan Church; Protestantism; Islam; MCGI
- Catholic diocese: Diocese of Imus
- Patron saint: Saint Roch; Our Lady of Solitude of Porta Vaga
- Website: www.cavitecity.gov.ph

Cavite City, officially the City of Cavite (Filipino: Lungsod ng Kabite; Chavacano: Ciudad de Cavite) is a component city in the Philippines. According to the 2024 census, it has a population of 98,673 people.

The city was the capital of Cavite Province from its establishment in 1614 until the title was transferred to the newly created, more accessible city of Trece Martires in 1954. Cavite City was originally a small port town, Cavite Puerto, that prospered during the early Spanish colonial period, when it served as the main seaport of Manila. Cavite Puerto hosted the Manila-Acapulco galleon trade, along with other large sea-bound ships. Thereafter, San Roque and La Caridad, two formerly independent towns in Cavite province, were annexed by the city. Today, Cavite City includes the communities of San Antonio (Cañacao and Sangley Point), the southern districts of Santa Cruz and Dalahican, and the outlying islands of the province, such as the historic Corregidor Island.

== Etymology ==
The city has been known by at least two Tagalog names. The first, Tangway, was the name given to the area by Tagalog settlers. Tangwáy means "peninsula." The second is Kawit or "hook," referring to the hook-shaped landform along the coast of Bacoor Bay, and from which the Chinese Keit and Spanish Cavite are derived.

== History ==
=== Early history ===
The early inhabitants of Cavite City were the Tagalogs ruled by the Kampilan and the bullhorn of a datu, the tribal form of government. According to folklore, the earliest settlers came from Borneo, led by Gat Hinigiw and his wife Dayang Kaliwanag, who bore seven children. Archaeological evidence in the coastal areas shows prehistoric settlements.

=== Spanish colonial era ===
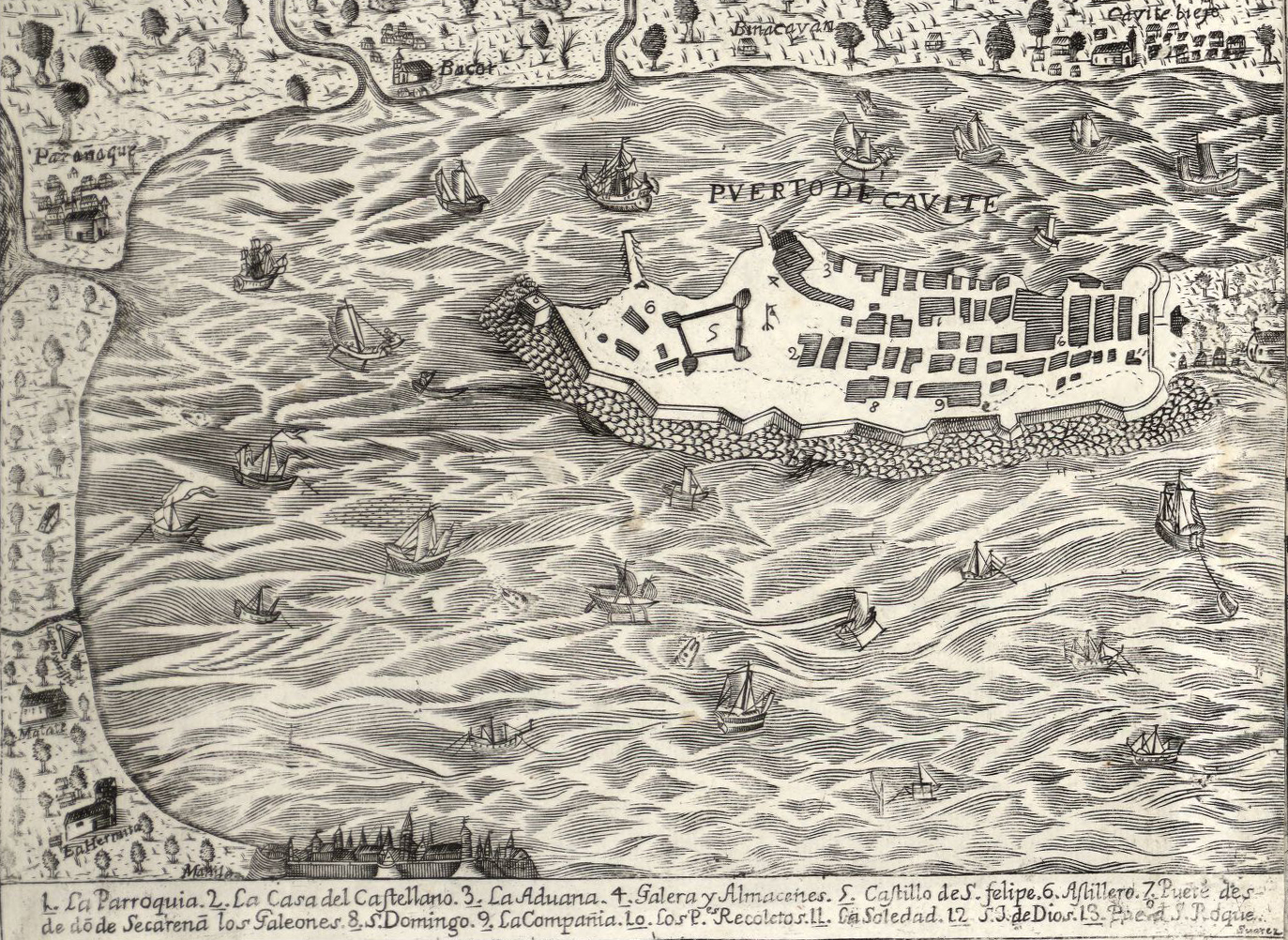
Illustration of the Port of Cavite from the Carta Hydrographica y Chorographica de las Yslas Filipinas (1734)

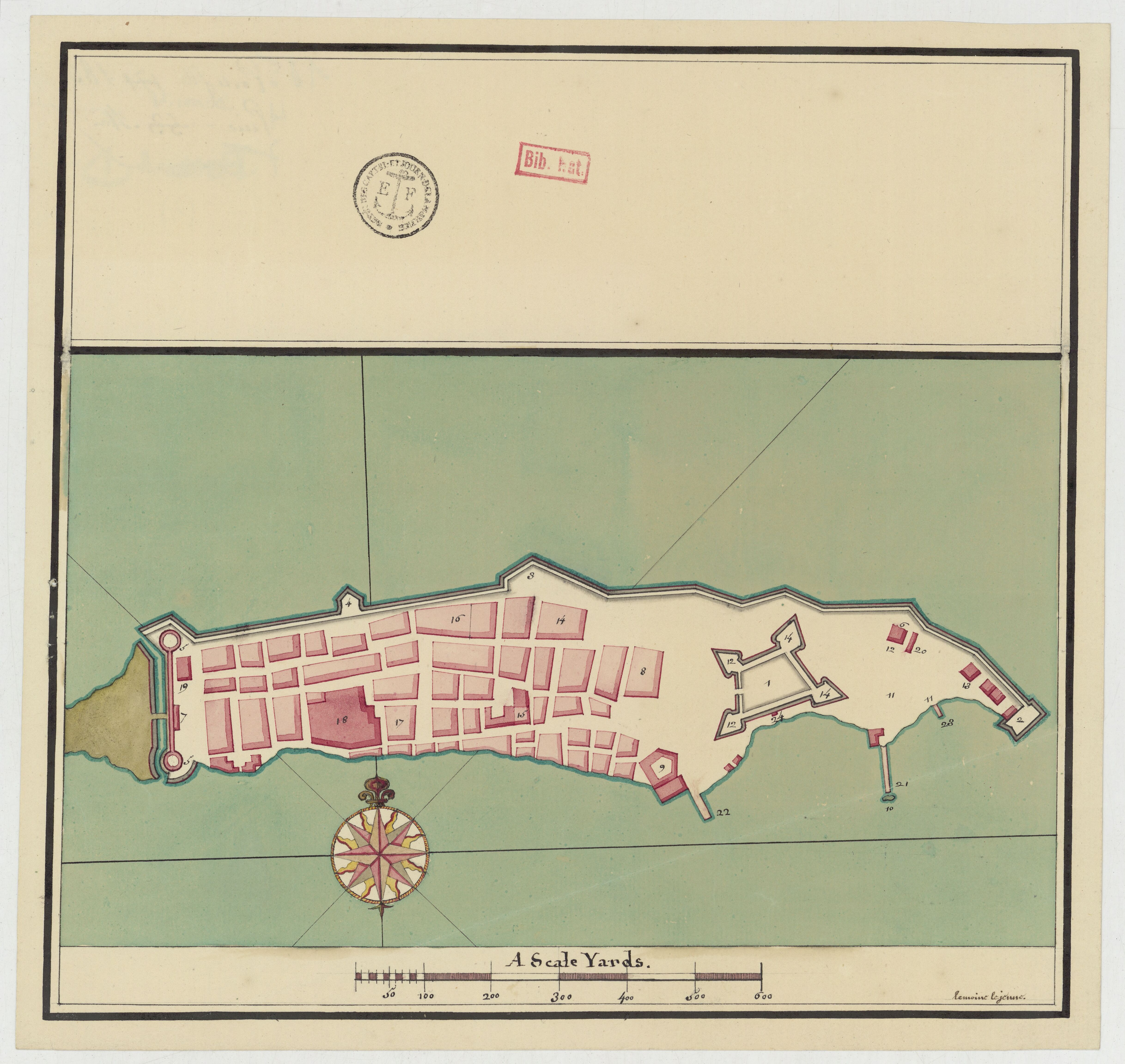
Master plan for the then-town of Cavite (1762)

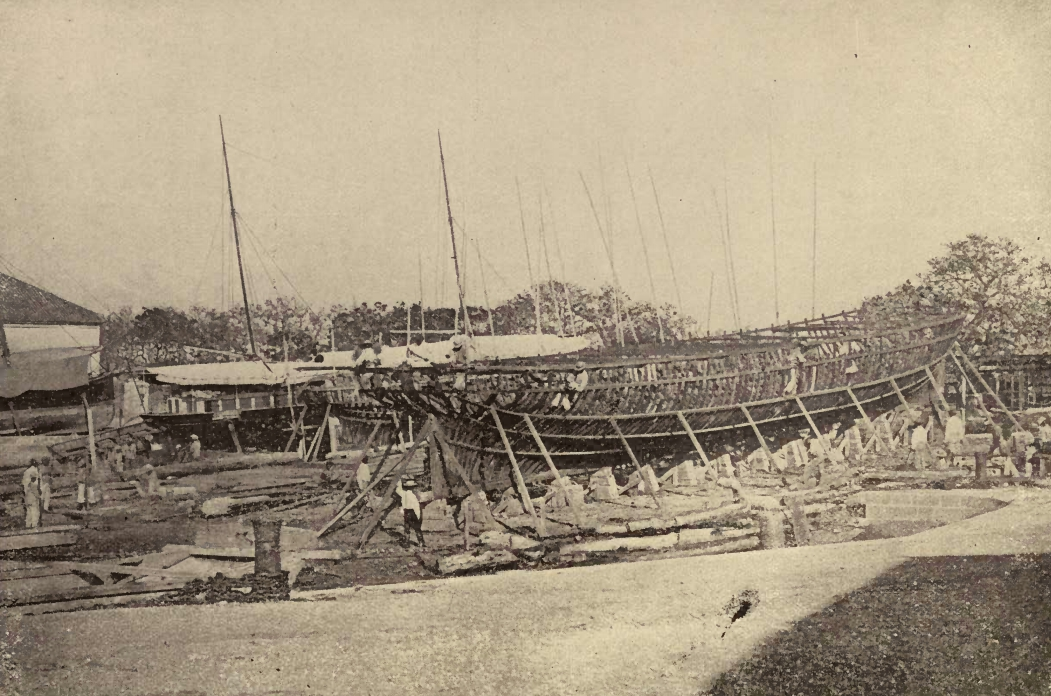
The Spanish shipyards and arsenal in Cavite (1899)

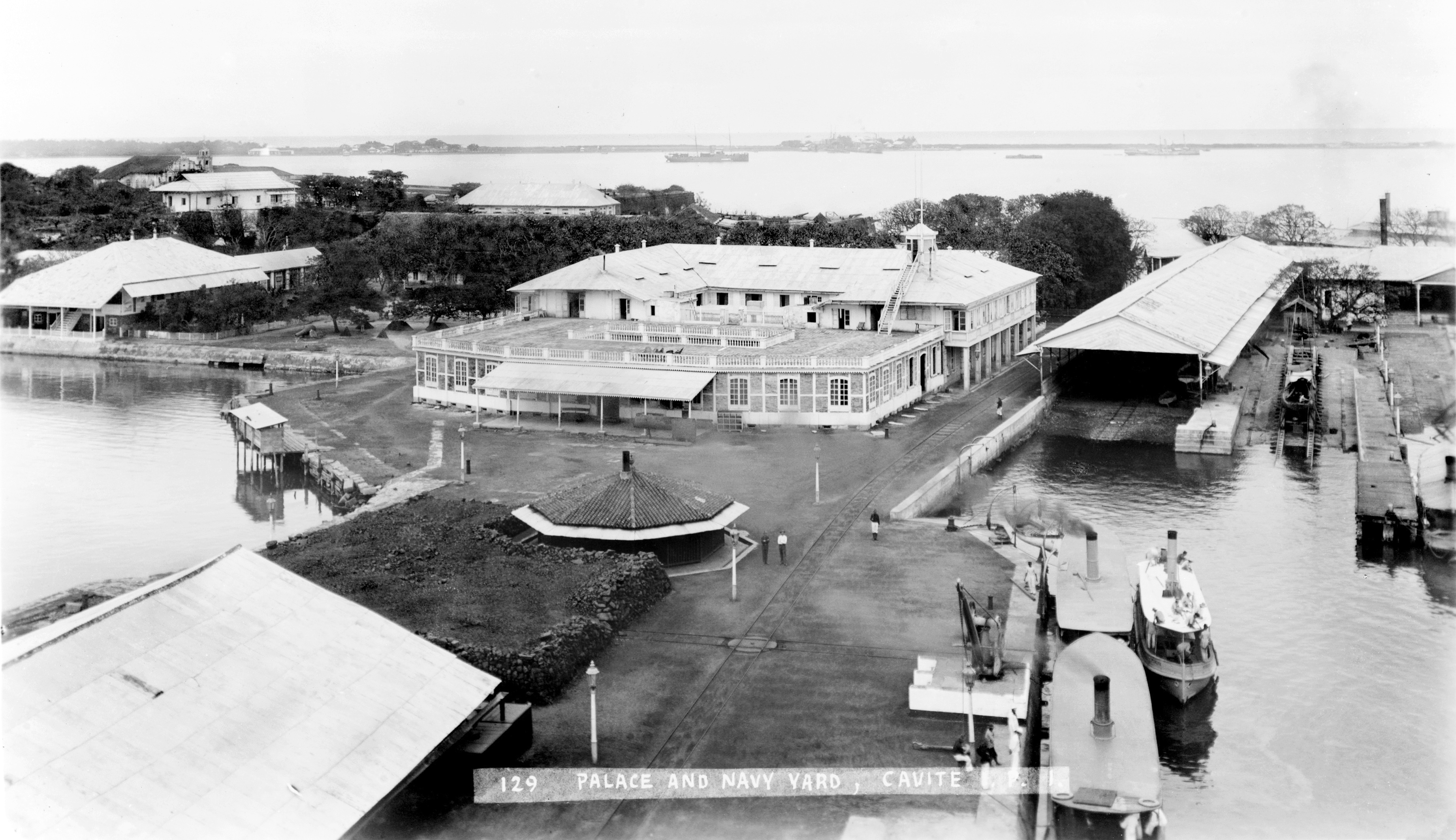
The Governor's Palace in the Navy Yard (1899)

On May 16, 1571, the Spanish conquistador Miguel López de Legazpi declared the region a royal encomienda, or royal land grant. Spanish colonizers settled in the most populated area (present-day Kawit) and called it Cavite. The old Tangway at the tip of the Cavite Peninsula, across Bacoor Bay, was referred to as Cavite la Punta, meaning "Point of Cavite" or Cavite Point. Upon discovering that, because of its deep waters, Cavite la Punta was a suitable place for the repair and construction of Spanish galleons, the Spanish moved their settlement there and called it Cavite Nuevo (New Cavite) or just Cavite. The first settlement was renamed "Cavite Viejo" (and in the early 20th century, regained its former name, Kawit). In 1582, the Spanish founded Cavite City with 65 Spanish households.

In 1590, the Spaniards fortified Cavite Nuevo/Cavite City with murallas (high thick curtain walls) on its western, northern, and eastern sides, while Bacoor Bay remained open to the south. Fort Guadalupe was built at the same time on the eastern tip, and the town became the Puerto de Cavite (Port of Cavite) or Cavite Puerto. The Fort of San Felipe Neri and the Porta Vaga Gate began construction in 1595 and were completed in 1602. Puerta Vaga (corrupted to Porta Vaga) was the port city's barbican, the only principal entrance from San Roque in the west. It was flanked by the western wall, protected by two bastions at its northern and southern ends. The wall and gate were also separated from the mainland by a moat, which made the town like an island.

Cavite was legally founded in 1614 with Tomás Salazar as the earliest known gobernadorcillo recorded. At the same time, the town became the capital of the new politico-military province of Cavite, established also in 1614. Like some other provinces during the Spanish era, the province adopted the name of its capital town – e.g., Bulacan, Bulacan province; Tayabas, Tayabas (now Quezon province); Tarlac, Tarlac province; and Manila, Manila province.

San Roque was founded as a separate town in 1614. In 1663, during the Spanish evacuation of Ternate, Indonesia, the 200 families of mixed Mexican-Filipino-Spanish and Papuan-Indonesian-Portuguese descent who had ruled over the Christianized Sultanate of Ternate, including their Christian-convert Sultan, were relocated to the cities of Ternate (Cavite province), Ermita, Manila, and San Roque (Cavite province).

In subsequent years, Latin-American soldiers from Mexico were deployed at Cavite: 70 soldiers in 1636; 89 in 1654; 225 in 1670; and 211 in 1672.

San Roque was later placed under the civil administration of Cavite until it was granted the right to be a separate and independent municipality in 1720. La Caridad, formerly known as La Estanzuela de San Roque, separated and was legally founded as a town in 1868. Governor-General José de la Gardana granted the petition of the people led by Don Justo Miranda to make Barrio La Estanzuela an independent town.

By the end of the 1700s, Cavite was the main port of Manila and was a province of 5,724 native families and 859 Spanish Filipino families. The 1818 Spanish census showed that the port of Cavite alone had 221 native families and 153 Spanish-Filipino families.

==== City of Churches ====
As the town grew, it developed a cosmopolitan reputation, and attracted various religious orders to set up churches, convents, and hospitals within the confines of the fortified city center. The Franciscan Hospital de San José (Saint Joseph’s Hospital) was built for sailors and soldiers in 1591. The San Diego de Alcalá Convent was built in 1608, followed by the Convents of Porta Vaga (La Ermita), Our Lady of Loreto (Jesuit), San Juan de Dios (Saint John of God), Santo Domingo (Dominicans), Santa Mónica (Recollects), and San Pedro, the port's parish church. The fortified town enclosed eight churches, the Jesuit college of San Ildefonso, public buildings and residences, all meant to serve the needs of its population of natives, soldiers and workers at the port, transients, and passengers aboard galleons.

During this period, the city was called Tierra de Maria Santísima (“Land of Mary, Most Holy”) because of local Marian devotion. Squares and parks abounded: Plaza de Armas (across from Fort San Felipe), Plaza de San Pedro (across the church), Plaza Soledad (across Porta Vaga), and Plaza del Reparo (bayside).

==== Manila-Acapulco Galleon Trade ====
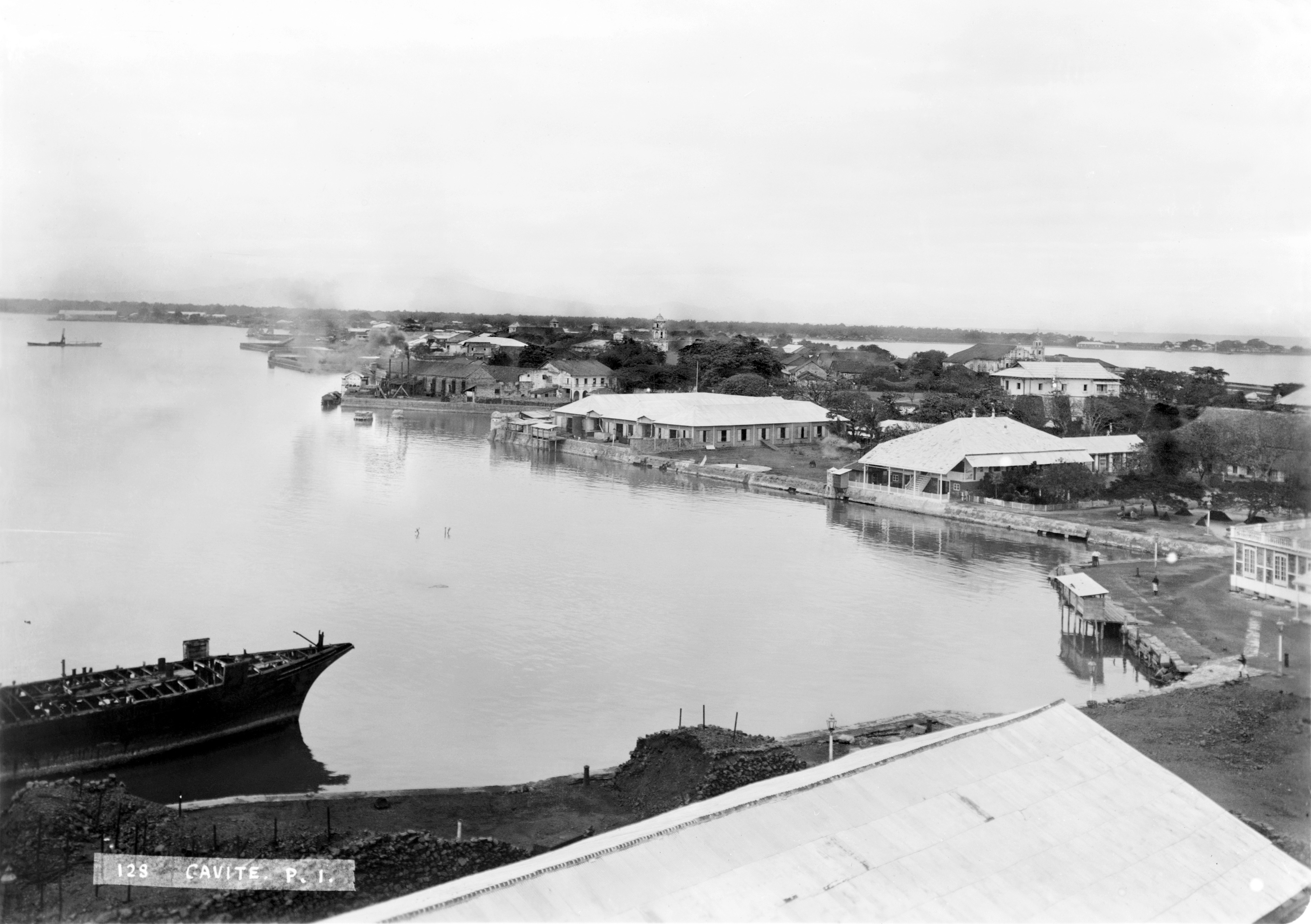
The skyline of the old Port City of Cavite in 1899.

The Port of Cavite (Puerto de Cavite) was linked to the history of world trade. Spanish galleons passed back and forth every July between Acapulco and Cavite. Galleons and other heavy ocean-going ships were not able to enter the Port of Manila along the Pasig River because of a sand bar that only allows light vessels to reach the river-port. For this reason, the Port of Cavite was regarded as the Port of Manila, as the main seaport of the colonial capital.

At the height of the Manila-Acapulco Galleon Trade, the Port of Cavite was the arrival and departure port of the Spanish galleons that brought many foreign travelers (mostly Spaniards and Latinos) to its shores. The Port of Cavite was fondly called Ciudad de Oro Macizo ("City of Solid Gold"). The Wanli Emperor of the Ming Dynasty once sent an expedition to the place they called Keit (Cavite) to search for gold, received by Governor-General Pedro Bravo de Acuña. Marilola Pérez, in her 2015 thesis "Cavite Chabacano Philippine Creole Spanish: Description and Typology", describes a large number of Mexicans settling in Cavite and spreading to Luzon, integrating into the local population and leading peasant revolts. Mexicans were not the only Latin Americans in Cavite, as there were also a fair number of other Latin Americans. One of these was the Puerto Rican Alonso Ramírez, who became a sailor in Cavite, and published an influential early Latin American novel entitled "Infortunios de Alonso Ramírez"

Between 1609 and 1616 the galleons Espíritu Santo and San Miguel were constructed in the shipyard of the port, called the Astillero de Rivera (Rivera Shipyard of Cavite), sometimes spelled as Ribera.

==== San Roque Isthmus ====
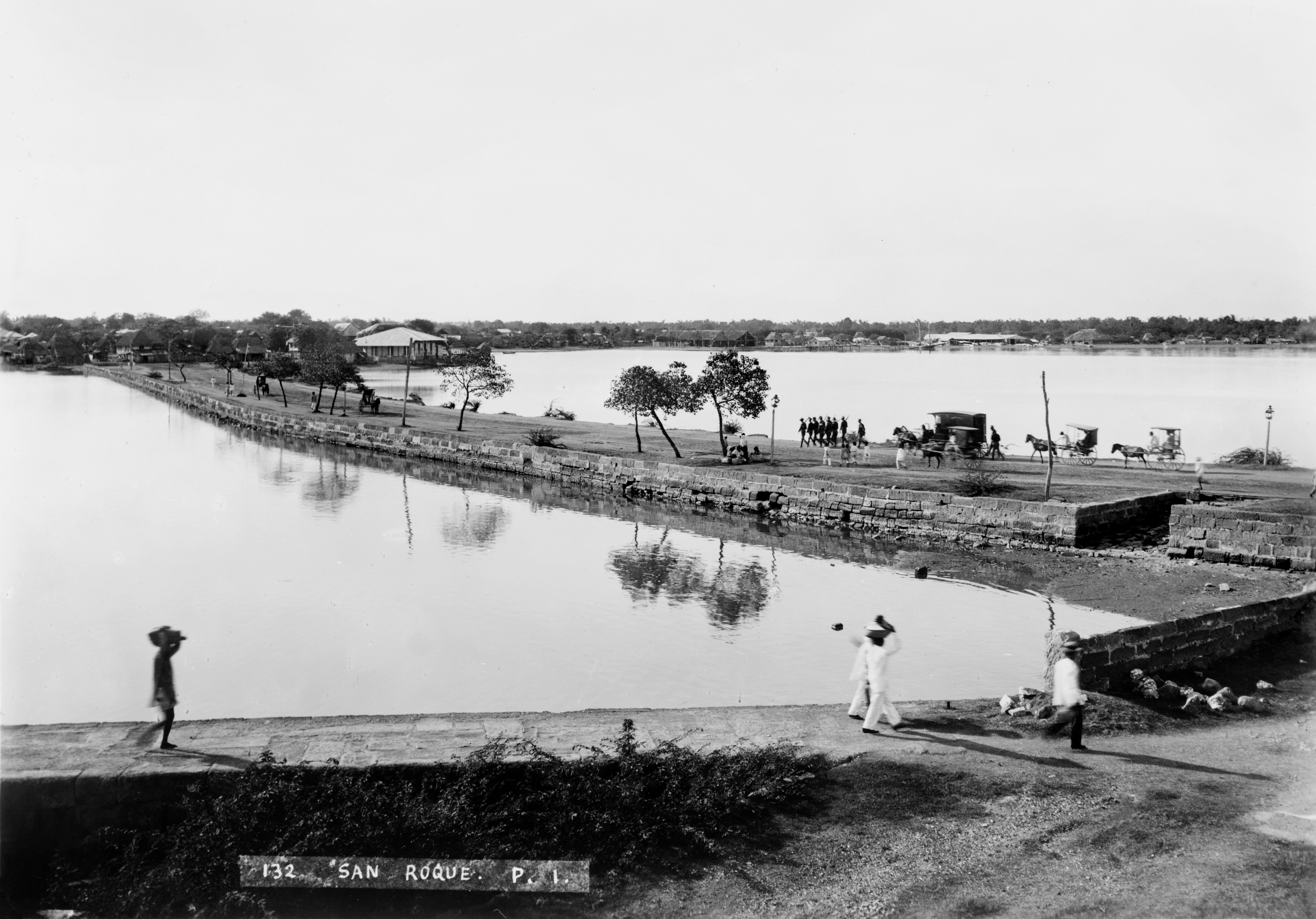
The San Roque causeway connecting Cavite Nuevo to San Roque town (1899)

The narrow San Roque isthmus or causeway (now M. Valentino Street) connected Cavite Puerto to San Roque, its only border town. Maps from the 17th century show that this narrow isthmus was once as wide as the town itself. Problems with rising water and the encroaching waves that plagued Cavite Puerto likely eroded the land into a narrow isthmus.

=== American Occupation ===
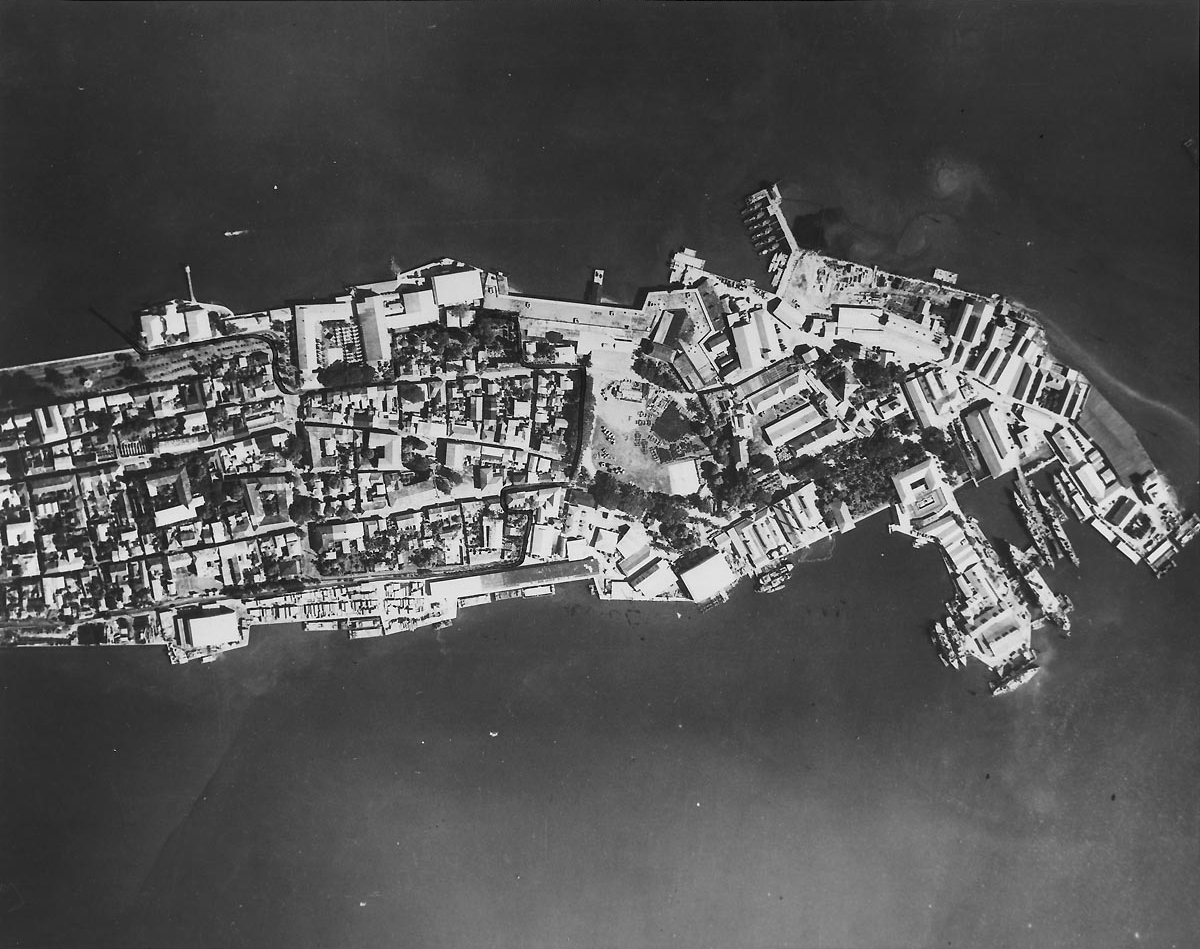
The U.S naval base in 1941 before its destruction in 1945.

Spain turned the port over to the Americans after the Treaty of Paris of 1898. At the start of the American era, Cavite Puerto became the seat of the U.S. Naval Forces in the Philippines. It was redesigned to make way for modern ships and armaments. The historical structures, like Fort Guadalupe, were demolished, along with most of Fort San Felipe.

Local government administration was reorganized under the Presidentes municipales with the direct supervision of American army officers (the first being Colonel Meade). The first Filipino Presidentes municipales were appointed: Don Zacaria Fortich for Cavite Puerto, Don Francisco Basa for San Roque, and Don Pedro Raqueño Bautista for Caridad.

In 1900, the Caviteños held their first election under the American regime. Each pueblo or town elected local officials: Presidente municipal, Vice-Presidente municipal and a Consejo (council) composed of Consejales (councilors). Don Gregorio Basa was elected as the Presidente Municipal of present-day Cavite City.

In 1901, the Philippine Commission approved a municipal code as the organic law of all local governments throughout the country. In its implementation in 1903, the three separate pueblos of Cavite Puerto, San Roque, and La Caridad were merged into one municipality, which was called the Municipality of Cavite. By virtue of a legislative act promulgated by the First Philippine Assembly, Cavite was again made the capital of the province. Subsequently, its territory was enlarged to include the district of San Antonio and the island of Corregidor. The Municipality of Cavite functioned as a civil government whose officials consisted of a Presidente Municipal, a Vice-Presidente Municipal and ten Consejales duly elected by the qualified voters of the municipality.

In 1909, Executive Order No. 124, of Governor-General W. Cameron Forbes, declared the Act No. 1748 annexing Corregidor and the islands of Caballo (Fort Hughes), La Monja, El Fraile (Fort Drum), Santa Amalia, Carabao (Fort Frank) and Limbones, as well as all waters and detached rocks surrounding them, to the Municipality of Cavite.

==== Cityhood ====
Under the Philippine Commonwealth, Assemblyman Manuel S. Roxas sponsored Commonwealth Act No. 547, elevating Cavite's status to a chartered city. On September 7, 1940, the executive function of the city was vested in a City Mayor appointed by the President of the Philippine Commonwealth. The legislative body of the City of Cavite was vested on a Municipal Board composed of three electives, two appointives, and two ex-officio councilors, with the City Mayor as the presiding officer.

=== Japanese occupation ===
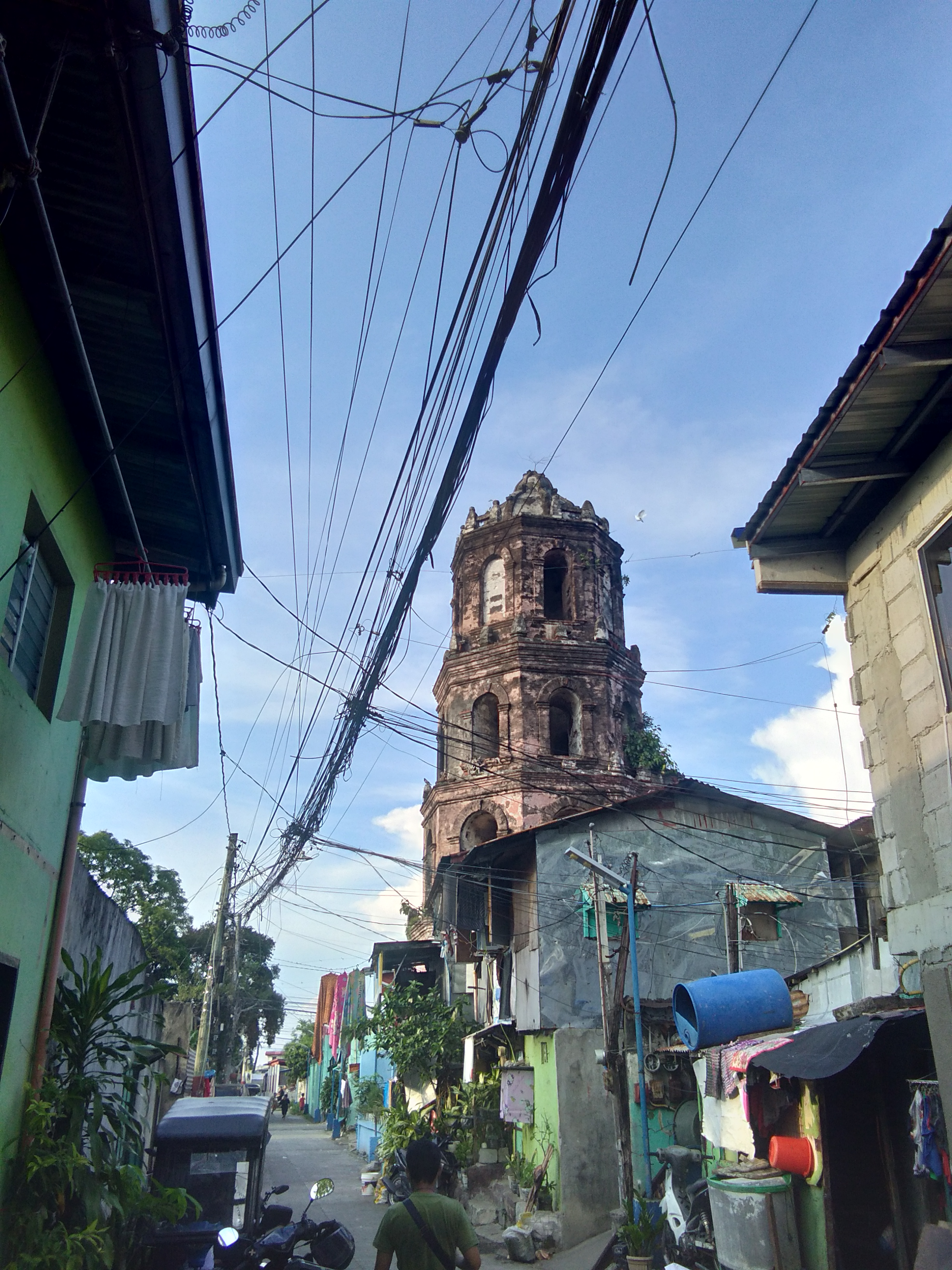
The Spanish era belfry ruins of the former Augustinian Recollects Church of Santa Monica after the city was heavily bombarded during World War II in 1945.

On December 10, 1941, two days after an attack that had destroyed American air defenses at Clark Field and three days after the Japanese attack on Pearl Harbor, Japanese Imperial Forces destroyed Cavite Naval Base and bombed Cavite City.

Later, after Japan seized the Philippines, Japanese leaders appointed at least two City Mayors of Cavite City.

The island of Corregidor played an important role during the Japanese invasion of the Philippines. The island was the site of two costly sieges and pitched battles—the first in early 1942, and the second in January, 1945—between the Imperial Japanese Army and the U.S. Army, along with its smaller subsidiary force, the Philippine Army.

In 1945, during the fight to liberate the country from Japan, the US and Philippine Commonwealth militaries bombarded the Japanese forces stationed in the city, completely destroying the old historic port of Cavite. The old walls and the Porta Vaga Gate were damaged. Most of the structures were destroyed, but some of the church towers remained. The city was littered with bomb craters.

After the war, the city's local administration resumed operations. The walls, gates, and ruins of the old city were later removed. Only the bell tower of the Church of Santa Monica of the Augustinian Recollects and the two bastions of Fort San Felipe remain from the old city.

=== Post-war era ===
==== Third Republic (1946-1972) ====
Republic Act No. 981, passed by the Congress of the Philippines in 1954, transferred the capital of the province from Cavite City to the newly established Trece Martires. Subsequently, the city charter was amended. By virtue of an amendment to the charter of Cavite City, the City Mayor, City Vice Mayor and eight councilors were elected by popular vote. The first election of city officials in this way was held in 1963.

==== During the Marcos presidency and dictatorship (1965-1986) ====
The Philippines' gradual postwar recovery took a turn for the worse in the late 1960s and early 1970s, with the 1969 Philippine balance of payments crisis being an early landmark event. Economic analysts generally attribute the crisis to the ramp-up on loan-funded government spending to promote Ferdinand Marcos’ 1969 reelection campaign. In September 1972, one year before the expected end of his last constitutionally allowed term as president, president Marcos placed the Philippines under martial law. This allowed Marcos to remain in power for fourteen more years, during which Cavite endured many social and economic obstacles.

On February 25, 1972, amidst a spate of assassinations against Cavite government officials, mayor and former congressman Manuel S. Rojas was assassinated by multiple gunmen in the barrio of Panapaan in Bacoor, Cavite while on the road with his driver, a policeman, to Manila; both Rojas and his driver were unarmed.

The excesses of the Marcos Family prompted opposition from various Filipino citizens despite the risks of arrest and torture Victims of human rights abuses during this period included Cavite City resident and University of the Philippines student leader Emmanuel Alvarez. Alvarez, a descendant of Katipunan General Pascual Alvarez, became one of the desaparecidos of Martial law under Ferdinand Marcos when he was accosted by two men believed to be military personnel while commuting from his home in Cavite City on January 6, 1976, and never seen again. He has formally been honored as a hero of Philippine democracy, having had his name etched on the wall of remembrance of the Philippines' Bantayog ng mga Bayani.

During the 1986 snap elections, Marcos won against Corazon Aquino in Region IV (which then included the provinces of MIMAROPA) according to the official COMELEC results, but this was disputed by NAMFREL. An exit poll conducted by American election observers found that voters from Cavite City preferred Aquino over Marcos.

==== Land reclamation ====
Samonte Park.

In the latter part of the 1960s and early 1970s, the land adjacent to the San Roque isthmus was reclaimed. The new land is now occupied by the San Sebastian College – Recoletos de Cavite and some residential homes. The present Cavite City Hall is built where the north tower of the old western wall once stood, which was already partly reclaimed by 1945.

Half of the old port city, including Fort San Felipe, is now occupied by Naval Base Cavite and is closed to the public. The old historic core of Cavite is now part of the San Roque district, and is referred to today as either Fort San Felipe or Porta Vaga. The former location of the Porta Vaga Gate, the western wall, and its towers is now occupied by the Governor Samonte Park.

=== Contemporary era ===
A portion of Danilo Atienza Air Base was converted into a domestic airport in 2020 called Sangley Point Airport. The airport is planned to be converted into an international airport under the national government's Public-Private Partnership (PPP) program. The original proponent status (OPS) contract was initially awarded to a consortium between MacroAsia Corporation and China Communications Construction Company Ltd., until it was dropped by the provincial government in 2021. After another round of bidding, the contract was awarded to the Yuchengco-led Sangley Point International Airport Consortium in 2022.

== Geography ==
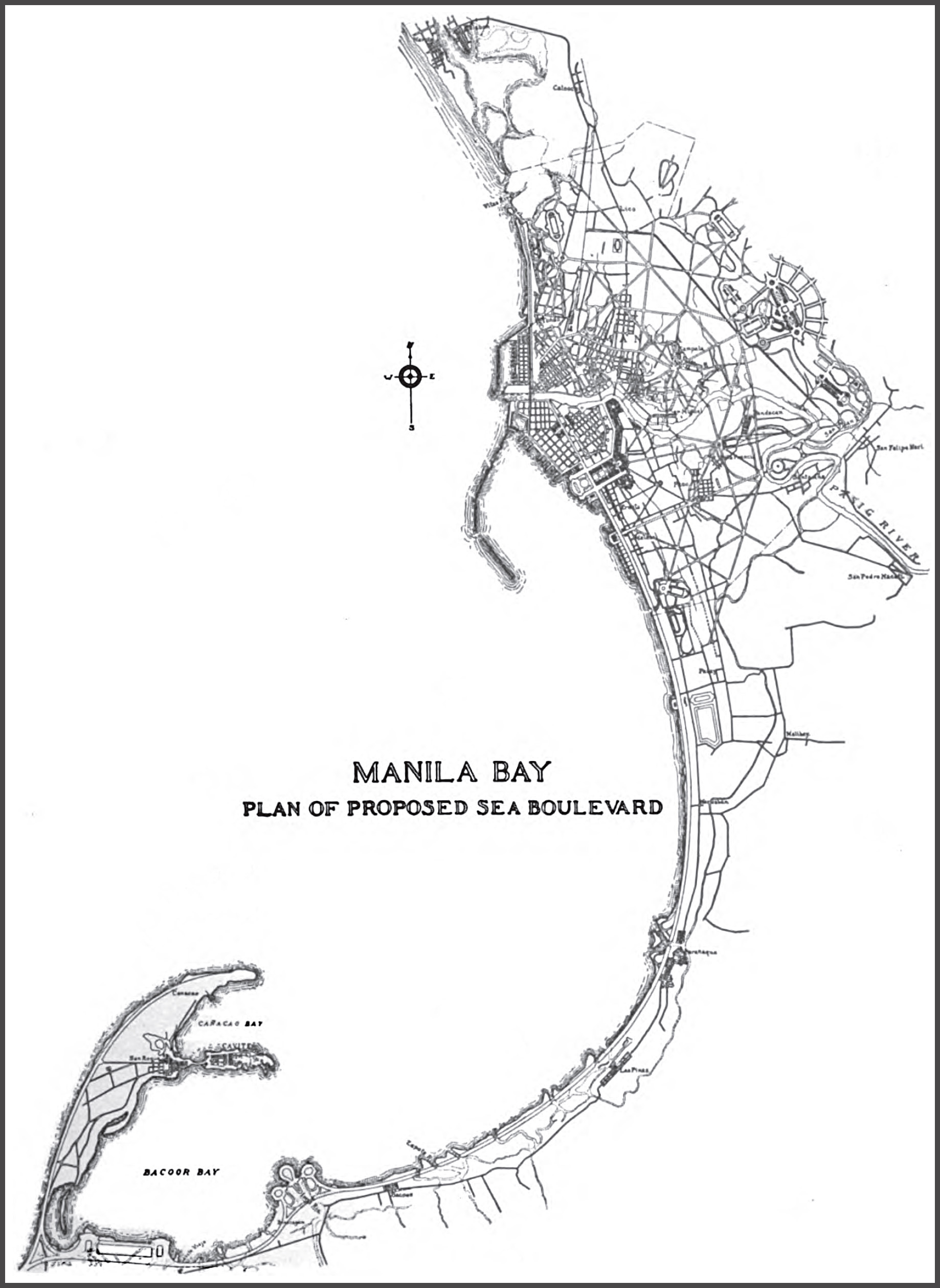
Cavite City and peninsula (lower left) in relation to the City of Manila (upper middle).

Cavite City occupies most of the hook-shaped Cavite Peninsula that juts into Manila Bay. The peninsula is lined by Bacoor Bay to the southeast. The peninsula ends in two tips – Sangley Point and Cavite Point. Cañacao Bay is the body of water formed between the points. Cavite Point was the location of the old historic Port of Cavite. Both Bacoor and Cañacao Bays are inland bays within the larger Manila Bay. The city's only land border is with the Municipality of Noveleta to the south.

The city is the northernmost settlement in the Province of Cavite, which lies southwest from Manila with a direct distance of about 11 kilometers (6.8 mi) but about 35 kilometers (22 mi) overland/by road. Sangley Point, the former location of the United States Sangley Point Naval Base, is the northernmost point of the city, peninsula and province. The former American military naval base has since been converted into a Philippine military base.

The historic island of Corregidor, the adjacent islands and detached rocks of Caballo, Carabao, El Fraile and La Monja found at the mouth of Manila Bay are part of the city's territorial jurisdiction.

=== Climate ===
Cavite City has a tropical wet and dry climate (Köppen climate classification Aw), with a pronounced dry season from December to April, and a lengthy wet season from May to November that brings abundant rainfall into the city.

Climate data for Cavite City (Danilo Atienza Air Base) 1991–2020, extremes 1974–2023
Month	Jan	Feb	Mar	Apr	May	Jun	Jul	Aug	Sep	Oct	Nov	Dec	Year
Record high °C (°F)	34.8 (94.6)	35.2 (95.4)	36.6 (97.9)	37.8 (100.0)	38.5 (101.3)	38.4 (101.1)	36.4 (97.5)	36.5 (97.7)	35.6 (96.1)	35.8 (96.4)	36.4 (97.5)	34.0 (93.2)	38.5 (101.3)
Mean daily maximum °C (°F)	30.3 (86.5)	31.1 (88.0)	32.5 (90.5)	34.3 (93.7)	34.1 (93.4)	33.1 (91.6)	31.8 (89.2)	31.4 (88.5)	31.6 (88.9)	31.8 (89.2)	31.5 (88.7)	30.5 (86.9)	32.0 (89.6)
Daily mean °C (°F)	27.3 (81.1)	27.8 (82.0)	29.0 (84.2)	30.5 (86.9)	30.7 (87.3)	29.9 (85.8)	28.9 (84.0)	28.7 (83.7)	28.7 (83.7)	29.0 (84.2)	28.7 (83.7)	27.7 (81.9)	28.9 (84.0)
Mean daily minimum °C (°F)	24.3 (75.7)	24.5 (76.1)	25.5 (77.9)	26.8 (80.2)	27.2 (81.0)	26.7 (80.1)	26.1 (79.0)	25.9 (78.6)	25.9 (78.6)	26.1 (79.0)	25.8 (78.4)	25.0 (77.0)	25.8 (78.4)
Record low °C (°F)	19.0 (66.2)	18.0 (64.4)	19.1 (66.4)	21.5 (70.7)	22.0 (71.6)	22.0 (71.6)	21.2 (70.2)	22.0 (71.6)	21.0 (69.8)	21.0 (69.8)	21.5 (70.7)	20.0 (68.0)	18.0 (64.4)
Average rainfall mm (inches)	19.9 (0.78)	20.4 (0.80)	19.1 (0.75)	17.7 (0.70)	149.9 (5.90)	260.4 (10.25)	456.5 (17.97)	514.3 (20.25)	385.5 (15.18)	196.9 (7.75)	109.1 (4.30)	91.6 (3.61)	2,241.3 (88.24)
Average rainy days (≥ 1 mm)	3	3	3	2	8	13	18	19	17	12	9	7	114
Average relative humidity (%)	79	77	75	73	76	80	83	84	84	81	80	80	79
Source: PAGASA

=== Subdivisions ===
The city proper is divided into five districts: Dalahican, Santa Cruz, Caridad, San Antonio, and San Roque. These districts are further subdivided into eight zones and a total of 84 barangays.

=== Barangays ===
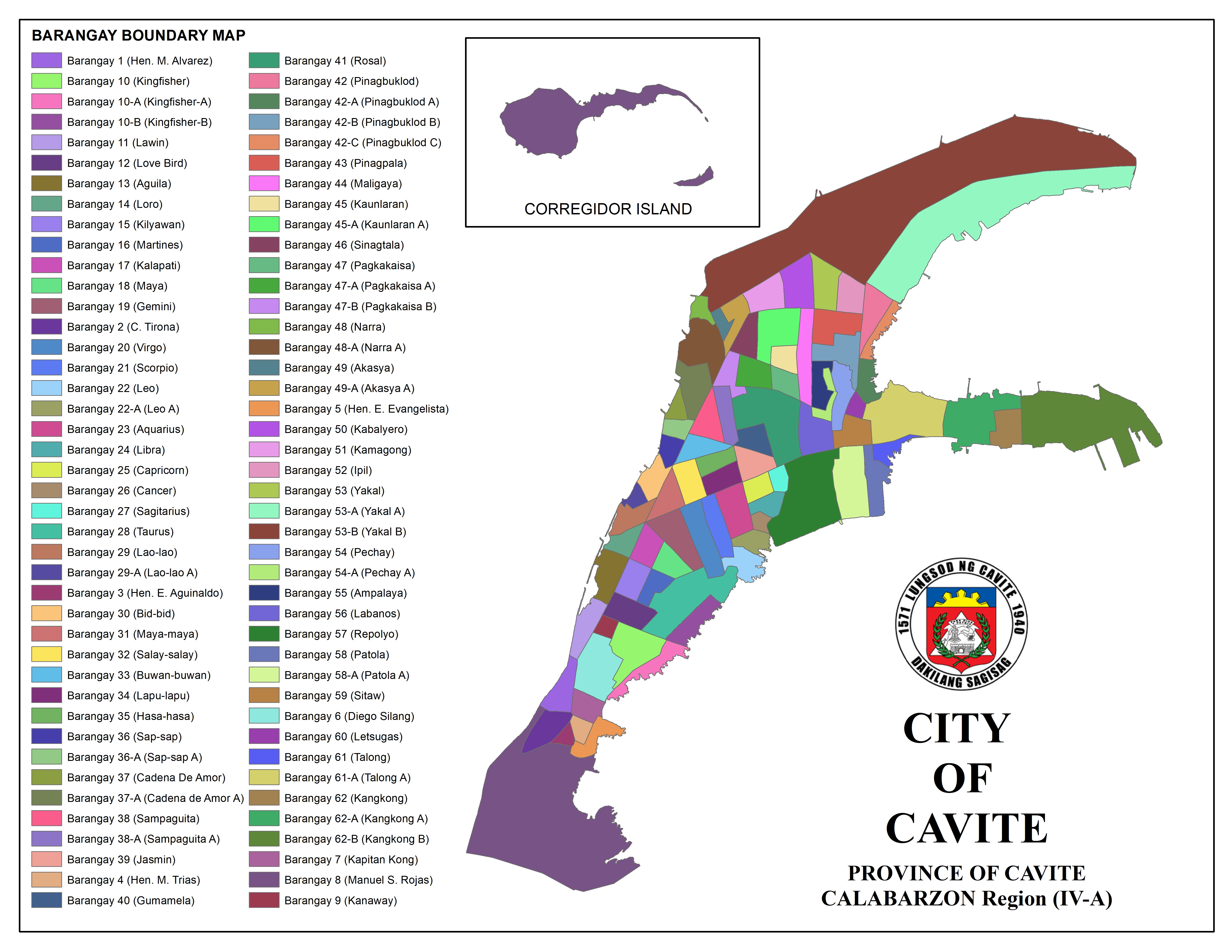
Map showing the constituent barangays of Cavite City.

Cavite City is politically subdivided into 84 barangays, as indicated below and the image herein. Each barangay consists of puroks and some have sitios.

- Barangay 1 (Hen. M. Alvarez)
- Barangay 2 (Hen. C. Tirona)
- Barangay 3 (Hen. E. Aguinaldo)
- Barangay 4 (Hen. M. Trias)
- Barangay 5 (Hen. E. Evangelista)
- Barangay 6 (Diego Silang)
- Barangay 7 (Kapitan Kong)
- Barangay 8 (Manuel S. Rojas)
- Barangay 9 (Kanaway)
- Barangay 10-M (Kingfisher)
- Barangay 10-A (Kingfisher A)
- Barangay 10-B (Kingfisher B)
- Barangay 11 (Lawin)
- Barangay 12 (Love Bird)
- Barangay 13 (Aguila)
- Barangay 14 (Loro)
- Barangay 15 (Kilyawan)
- Barangay 16 (Martines)
- Barangay 17 (Kalapati)
- Barangay 18 (Maya/Pisces)
- Barangay 19 (Gemini)
- Barangay 20 (Virgo)
- Barangay 21 (Scorpio)
- Barangay 22 (Leo)
- Barangay 22-A (Leo A)
- Barangay 23 (Aquarius)
- Barangay 24 (Libra)
- Barangay 25 (Capricorn)
- Barangay 26 (Cancer)
- Barangay 27 (Sagittarius)
- Barangay 28 (Taurus)
- Barangay 29 (Lao-lao/Aries)
- Barangay 29-A (Lao-lao A/Aries A)
- Barangay 30 (Bid-bid)
- Barangay 31 (Maya-maya)
- Barangay 32 (Salay-salay)
- Barangay 33 (Buan-buan)
- Barangay 34 (Lapu-lapu)
- Barangay 35 (Hasa-hasa)
- Barangay 36 (Sap-Sap)
- Barangay 36-A (Sap-sap A)
- Barangay 37-M (Cadena de Amor)
- Barangay 37-A (Cadena de Amor A)
- Barangay 38 (Sampaguita)
- Barangay 38-A (Sampaguita A)
- Barangay 39 (Jasmin)
- Barangay 40 (Gumamela)
- Barangay 41 (Rosal)
- Barangay 42 (Pinagbuklod)
- Barangay 42-A (Pinagbuklod A)
- Barangay 42-B (Pinagbuklod B)
- Barangay 42-C (Pinagbuklod C)
- Barangay 43 (Pinagpala)
- Barangay 44 (Maligaya)
- Barangay 45 (Kaunlaran)
- Barangay 45-A (Kaunlaran A)
- Barangay 46 (Sinagtala)
- Barangay 47 (Pagkakaisa)
- Barangay 47-A (Pagkakaisa A)
- Barangay 47-B (Pagkakaisa B)
- Barangay 48 (Narra)
- Barangay 48-A (Narra A)
- Barangay 49 (Akasya)
- Barangay 49-A (Akasya A)
- Barangay 50 (Kabalyero)
- Barangay 51 (Kamagong)
- Barangay 52 (Ipil)
- Barangay 53 (Yakal)
- Barangay 53-A (Yakal A) Air Force
- Barangay 53-B (Yakal B) Navy
- Barangay 54-A (Pechay A)
- Barangay 54-M (Pechay)
- Barangay 55 (Ampalaya)
- Barangay 56 (Labanos)
- Barangay 57 (Repolyo)
- Barangay 58 (Patola)
- Barangay 58-A (Patola A)
- Barangay 59 (Sitaw)
- Barangay 60 (Letsugas)
- Barangay 61 (Talong; Poblacion)
- Barangay 61-A (Talong A; Poblacion)
- Barangay 62 (Kangkong; Poblacion)
- Barangay 62-A (Kangkong A; Poblacion)
- Barangay 62-B (Kangkong B; Poblacion)

== Demographics ==
Population census of Cavite City
Year	Pop.	±% p.a.
1903	16,337	—
1918	22,169	+2.06%
1939	38,254	+2.63%
1948	35,052	−0.97%
1960	54,891	+3.81%
1970	75,739	+3.27%
1975	82,456	+1.72%
1980	87,666	+1.23%
1990	91,641	+0.44%
1995	92,641	+0.20%
2000	99,367	+1.51%
2007	104,581	+0.71%
2010	101,120	−1.22%
2015	102,806	+0.32%
2020	100,674	−0.44%
2024	98,673	−0.48%
Source: Philippine Statistics Authority

According to the 2024 census, Cavite City has a population of 98,673 people, with a density of 9,100 inhabitants per square kilometer or 24,000 inhabitants per square mile.

=== Religion ===
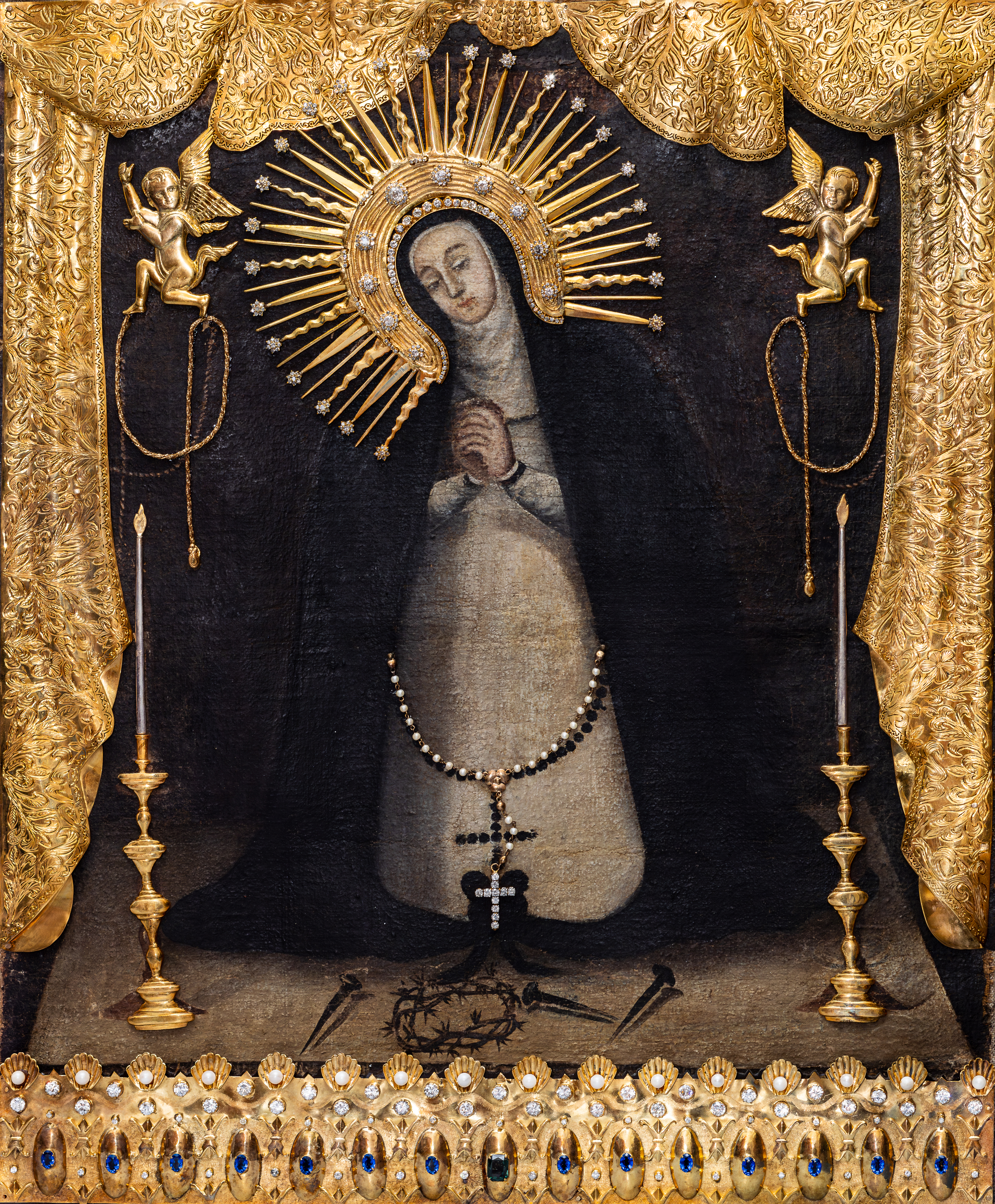
Nuestra Señora de la Soledad de Porta Vaga, Patroness of Cavite City.

According to 2000 census data, Christianity is the most prevalent religion in Cavite City, and a majority of Caviteños practice Roman Catholicism. Other Christian religious groups in the city include the Aglipayan Church, Iglesia ni Cristo (INC), Jehovah's Witnesses, United Church of Christ in the Philippines (UCCP), Jesus Is Lord Church (JIL), The United Methodist Church, Presbyterian Churches, Baptists and Bible Fundamental churches, Seventh-day Adventist Church, Members Church of God International or Ang Dating Daan, The Church of Jesus Christ of Latter Day Saints, and other UPC churches. A Muslim minority is also present in the city.

==== Nuestra Señora de la Soledad de Porta Vaga ====
The Nuestra Señora de la Soledad de Porta Vaga (Our Lady of Solitude of Porta Vaga) is viewed as the patroness of Cavite City. She is revered by Catholics as the Celestial Guardian and Protector of the Province of Cavite since her arrival. The image of Our Lady of Porta Vaga is designated as a National Cultural Treasure by the National Museum. It is the oldest existing Marian painting in the Philippines.

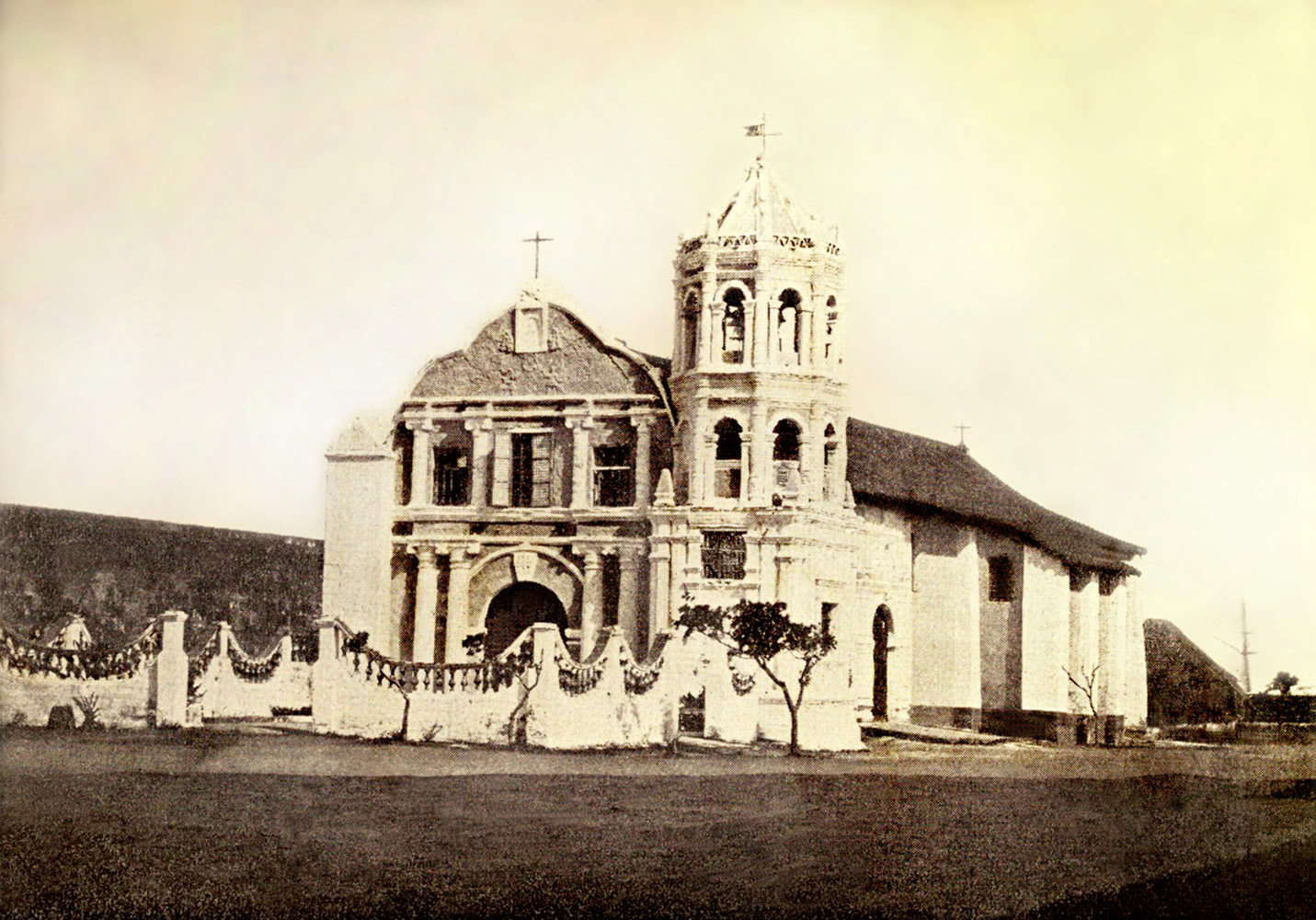
The Ermita de Porta Vaga or Porta Vaga Church, one of the churches in Cavite Puerto, where Our Lady of Solitude was enshrined with the western wall, visible to the left of the building.

The image of the virgin is painted on a canvas. Mary, clothed in black and white like a lady in mourning, kneels as she contemplates the passion of her son. Before her are the crown of thorns and the nails used during the Crucifixion. An inscription was found on the back of the painting – A doze de Abril 1692 años Juan Oliba puso esta Stma. Ymagen Haqui, which means, "The sacred image was placed here by Juan Oliba on April 12, 1692". This particular icon was used to bless the galleons sailing between Cavite and Acapulco (Mexico) during formal sending off ceremonies, and was also called the Patroness of the Galleons.

The image was originally enshrined at the Ermita de Porta Vaga, a small church adjacent to the Porta Vaga Gate, which was destroyed during World War II. The image is presently enshrined at the San Roque Parish Church, one of the three parishes in the city.

=== Languages ===
Chavacano is a Spanish-influenced creole language formerly spoken by majority of the people living in the city. Chavacano emerged sometime after the arrival of the first Spaniards and Mexicans in the late 16th century. During this period, the people that lived near the military arsenal in Cavite City communicated with Spaniards and Mexicans and began to incorporate Spanish words into their vernacular. Today, the majority of residents speak Tagalog.

Chavacano is generally considered to be dying, with only a fraction of people, mostly elderly, able to speak the language. According to the Filipino professor Alfredo B. German, who wrote a thesis on the grammar of Chavacano, the present conditions do not encourage people to learn the language. There are many likely reasons for the diminishing of Chavacano, such as the influx of Tagalog-speaking migrants and intermarriage.

Filipino writer and poet Jesus Balmori expressed himself in Chavacano, and wrote several verses in it. Don Jaime de Veyra, writer and famous Filipino historian, wrote the following lines: "I am afraid that the inevitable absorption of the 'Tagalog invasion' on one side and the 'invasion of the English' on the other hand, will wipe out or extinguish this inherited Castilian language in existence with its last representatives in the following generation." Professor Gervacio Miranda, who also wrote a book in Chavacano, said in his preface: "My only objective to write this book is to possibly conserve in written form the Chavacano of Cavite for posterity," fearing the extinction of the language.

== Economy ==
Poverty incidence of Cavite City (%)

Source: Philippine Statistics Authority

== Culture ==
=== Festivals and events ===
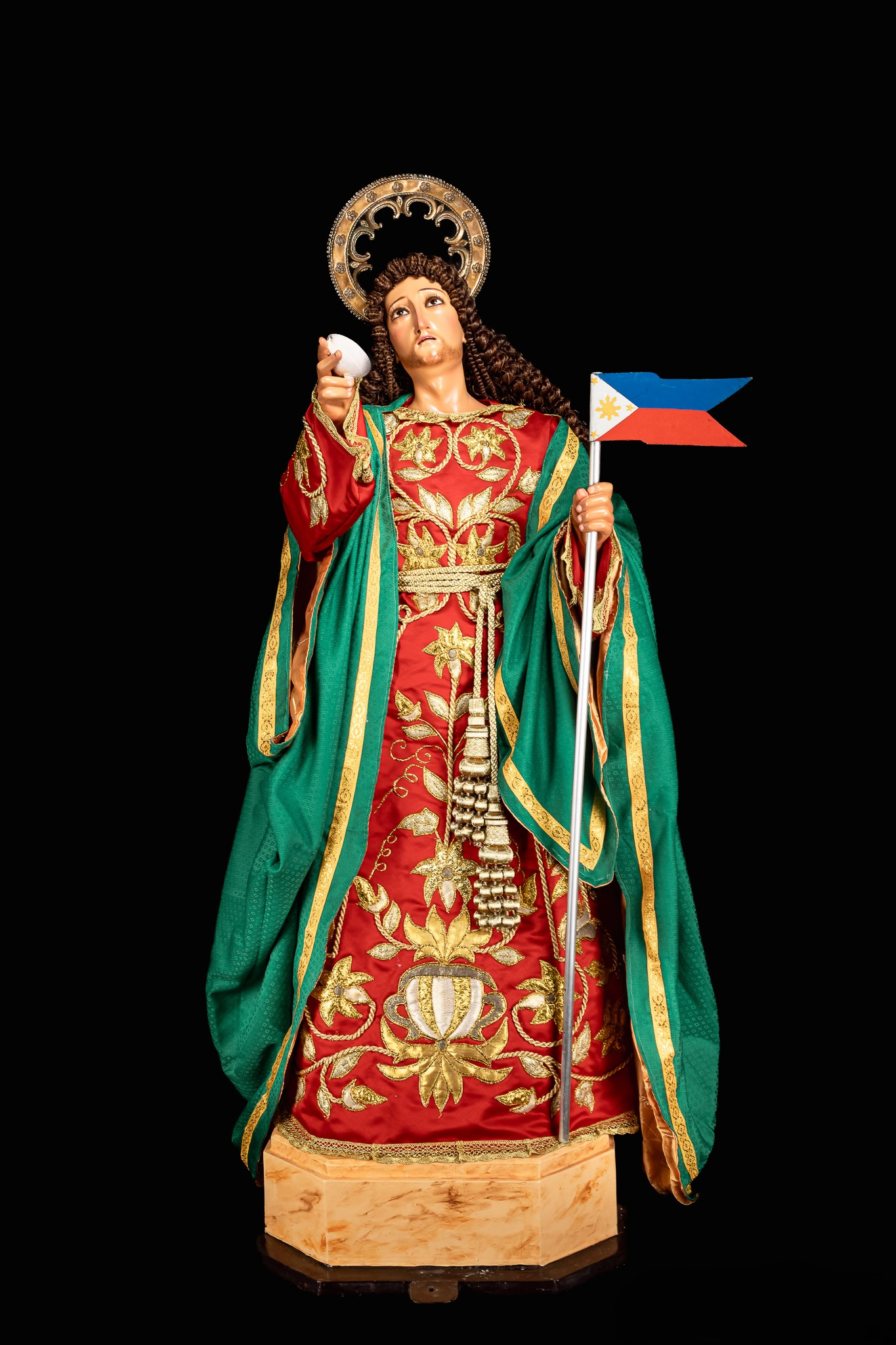
The Original Venerated Image of San Juan Bautista de Cavite the true center of the annual Regada Festival.

The city is home to the Annual Cavite City Water Festival or Regada, held from the 17th to the 24th of June. It is a festive and religious celebration of the feast of St. John the Baptist. Regada started in 1996, and features the Paulan or Basayawan, which is a street party where celebrators dance under water sprinklers.

Another celebration is the Feast for Our Lady of Solitude of Porta Vaga, which is annually observed by local Catholics during every second Sunday of November. The Cavite Fiesta reached its peak of grandeur between 1880 and 1886 under Governor Don Juan Salcedo y Mantilla de los Rios. Postponed in 1882 due to a cholera epidemic, the celebration resumed on January 20–21, 1883, with the governor inviting principalias from across the province. The day began with jubilant church bells and cannon salvos, as town officials, brass bands, and various community leaders paraded in colorful uniforms.

Cavite's streets transformed into a spectacle: vibrant arches, multicolored banderitas, and effigies of historical figures adorned every corner. Calle Real glowed with crystal lanterns, while streets leading to the Ermita were lined with temporary stalls selling unique delicacies like singkamas in brown syrup, local sweets, and fruits, alongside Manila ice cream vendors. Households rivaled Christmas spreads with lavish tables featuring Spanish-influenced gastronomical delights such as paella, cocido Madrileno, and tamales.

Afternoons brought civic parades with bamboo gigantes and native games like juego de toro at Plaza de Armas, alongside military exhibitions. The fiesta's pinnacle was the magnificent procession of the Virgen de la Soledad. Her route was brightly lit, carpeted, and covered with canvases. Borne on a silver carroza adorned with golden doves and ivory angels, her approach was heralded by the sweet pealing of campanillas. The day concluded with fireworks and a reenactment of the Virgin's conversation with the soldier at Porta Vaga. Genoveva Edroza, a Filipino writer, confirmed that Rizal's depiction of the San Diego fiesta in Noli Me Tangere was, in fact, based on Cavite's own grand celebrations.

Other notable holidays include the observance of Julián Felipe's birthday (January 28). Felipe, who composed the Philippine National Anthem, was born and raised in Cavite City. The city's Charter Day, known locally as simply Cavite City Day, which commemorates the signing of the city charter in 1940, is held every September 7.

=== Cuisine ===
Food in Cavite City is influenced by its Spanish heritage combined with Filipino tradition. One popular native dish is bacalao (sauteed codfish), which is served during the Lenten season. A variation of bibingka locally known as bibingkang samala can also be found in the city. This delicacy is made of glutinous rice (malagkit), coconut milk and sugar.

== Infrastructure ==
=== Transportation ===
The only road connecting Cavite City to the rest of Luzon is the National Route 62, which begins at P. Burgos Avenue in Caridad district and continues towards Noveleta as the Manila–Cavite Road (not to be confused with Manila-Cavite Expressway). A proposal to construct an expressway from Kawit to Cavite City via Bacoor Bay has been raised to the Department of Public Works and Highways (DPWH). When realized, the expressway would serve as a link to Manila-Cavite Expressway (CAVITEx).

Cavite City has one military airbase, Danilo Atienza Air Base, located at Sangley Point. The airport is operated by the Philippine Air Force. It was formerly a US Naval Base, called Naval Station Sangley Point, until it was turned over to the Philippine government in 1971. Portions of Danilo Atienza Air Base were converted into a civilian airport, built as a solution to the overcrowding of Ninoy Aquino International Airport.

As of 2019, no active water-based public transportation services were based in Cavite City. Metrostar Ferry, which began operations in 2007, used to serve trips from San Roque district to Pasay, Metro Manila. A new service from the Intramuros district of Manila to the nearby town of Noveleta to the south debuted in January 2018 and is currently the nearest water-based transport to the city.

=== Utilities ===
Water services are currently provided by Maynilad. Electric services are currently provided by Meralco.

== Symbols ==
=== Flag ===
The flag of the city was created by Mayor Timoteo O. Encarnacion Jr., and was adopted by the Sangguniang Panlungsod through Resolution No. 95-081 dated September 6, 1995, in time for the 55th Cavite City Charter Day. The meaning and significance of the flag components are:

- The two red strips symbolize courage and bravery.
- The middle green strip symbolizes progress and advancement
- The half sun has a twofold meaning. If it is the rising sun, it means hope, dreams, and visions for progress. If it is a setting sun, it stands for the sunset that can be seen from the city's western shores.
- The five yellow stars symbolize the five districts of Cavite City.
- The three sets of waves below the half sun, in three colors of navy blue, light blue and white, signify that Cavite City is a peninsula surrounded by water, while the three colors represent Cañacao Bay, Bacoor Bay, and Manila Bay.

=== Seal ===
The current seal of the city was designed by Mayor Timoteo O. Encarnacion, Jr. It was adopted by the Sangguniang Panlungsod through Resolution No. 140-90, then approved by the Local Executive on September 7, 1990. On November 3, 1993, the National Historical Institute and the president, through the Department of the Interior and Local Government, issued a Certificate of Registration recognizing the new seal.

The shield stands for bravery and fortitude. The colors red, white, blue, yellow stand for the loyalty of the people to its government. The inclusion of the rays portrays the role of Cavite as one of the original provinces that rose up in arms against Spanish domination in 1896 in the Philippine Revolution.

The white triangle inscribed within the shield with the letters KKK at the corners represents the part played by The city in the organization of the Katipunan. Don Ladislao Diwa of the city was one of the triumvirate who organized the patriotic group. Many Katipuneros came from the city.

Within the white triangle are symbols representing various events:

- At the bottom of the triangle is a fort with figures "1872" symbolizing the Cavite mutiny of 1872 at the Cavite Arsenal.
- At the background is a map of the city including the island of Corregidor representing the role of the island in the city's history.
- The obelisk at the left memorializes the Thirteen Martyrs of Cavite who were executed by the Spaniards on September 12, 1896.
- The sheet music at the right symbolizes Julián Felipe, composer of the Philippine National Anthem who was from the city.
- The fort symbol represents the Royal Fort of San Felipe and its role in the city and country's history, being the place where the "thirteen martyrs of Cavite" were detained and where the Cavite mutiny of 1872 took place.
- The scroll on the uppermost portion of the triangle contains the City motto "Para Dios y Patria" ("For God and Country") in the Chabacano language to emphasize the native language of the city.
- The green laurel leaf encircling the right and left portions of the KKK triangle symbolizes victories by reason.

== Notable personalities ==
- Nash Aguas
- Ruffy Biazon
- Roman Basa
- Ladislao Diwa
- Dino Reyes Chua
- Julián Felipe
- Joel Lamangan
- Celeste Legaspi
- Mona Lisa
- Raquel Monteza
- Mercedes Matias-Santiago
- Efren Peñaflorida
- Olivia Salamanca
- Leopoldo Salcedo
- Ferdinand Topacio

== Sister cities ==
Cavite City has two sister cities, as designated by Sister Cities International:

- Melilla, Spain
- San Diego, California, United States

== See also ==
- Naval Base Manila

First	Capital of Cavite; 1614–1954	Succeeded by Trece Martires
