= Sleepy Hollow =

Sleepy Hollow may refer to:

== Arts, entertainment, and media ==
=== Films ===
- The Legend of Sleepy Hollow (film), a 1980 film directed by Henning Schellerup, based on Washington Irving's story
- Sleepy Hollow (film), a 1999 film directed by Tim Burton, based on Washington Irving's story

=== Literature ===
- "The Legend of Sleepy Hollow", an 1820 short story by Washington Irving, which has inspired numerous adaptations

=== Music ===
- Sleepy Hallow (born 1999), American rapper and singer
- Sleepy Hollow (album), by the Siegel–Schwall Band (1972)
- Sleepy Hollow (soundtrack) of the Tim Burton movie (1999)
- "Sleepy Hollow", a 2020 song by Trippie Redd from the album Pegasus
- "Sleepy Hollow", a 2007 song by the Microphones from The Glow Pt. 2 (Other Songs & Destroyed Versions)

=== Television ===
- Sleepy Hollow (TV series), a 2013 American television drama series, loosely based on the Washington Irving story

== Places ==
=== United States ===
- Sleepy Hollow, Marin County, California
- Sleepy Hollow, San Bernardino County, California
- Sleepy Hollow, Illinois
- Sleepy Hollow, Indiana
- Sleepy Hollow, New York, the setting of Washington Irving's "The Legend of Sleepy Hollow"
- Sleepy Hollow, Virginia
- Sleepy Hollow, Wyoming
- Sleepy Hollow, a section of Plainfield, New Jersey
- Sleepy Hollow Lake, Greene County, New York

=== Elsewhere ===
- Sleepy Hollow (Mars), shallow depression on the planet Mars
- Sleepy Hollow, Saskatchewan, Canada
- Sleepy Hollow, South Australia, coastal feature adjoining the mouth of the Murray River

== Cemeteries ==
- Sleepy Hollow Cemetery (Concord, Massachusetts)
- Sleepy Hollow Cemetery, Sleepy Hollow, New York

== Other uses ==
- Sleepy Hollow Country Club, historic country-club in Scarborough-on-Hudson in Briarcliff Manor, New York
- Sleepy Hollow Stakes, thoroughbred-horse race held every fall at Belmont Park, New York
- Sleepy Hollow seat, manufactured by the Heywood-Wakefield Company
- Sleeping sickness of Kalachi, Kazakhstan, sometimes known as sleepy hollow

== See also ==
- Sleepy Hallow, an American rapper
