= Our Lady of Porta Vaga =

Marian apparition, Patroness of the Province of Cavite and Cavite City

Our Lady of Solitude of Porta Vaga Nuestra Señora de la Soledad de Porta Vaga Mahal na Birhen ng Soledad ng Porta Vaga
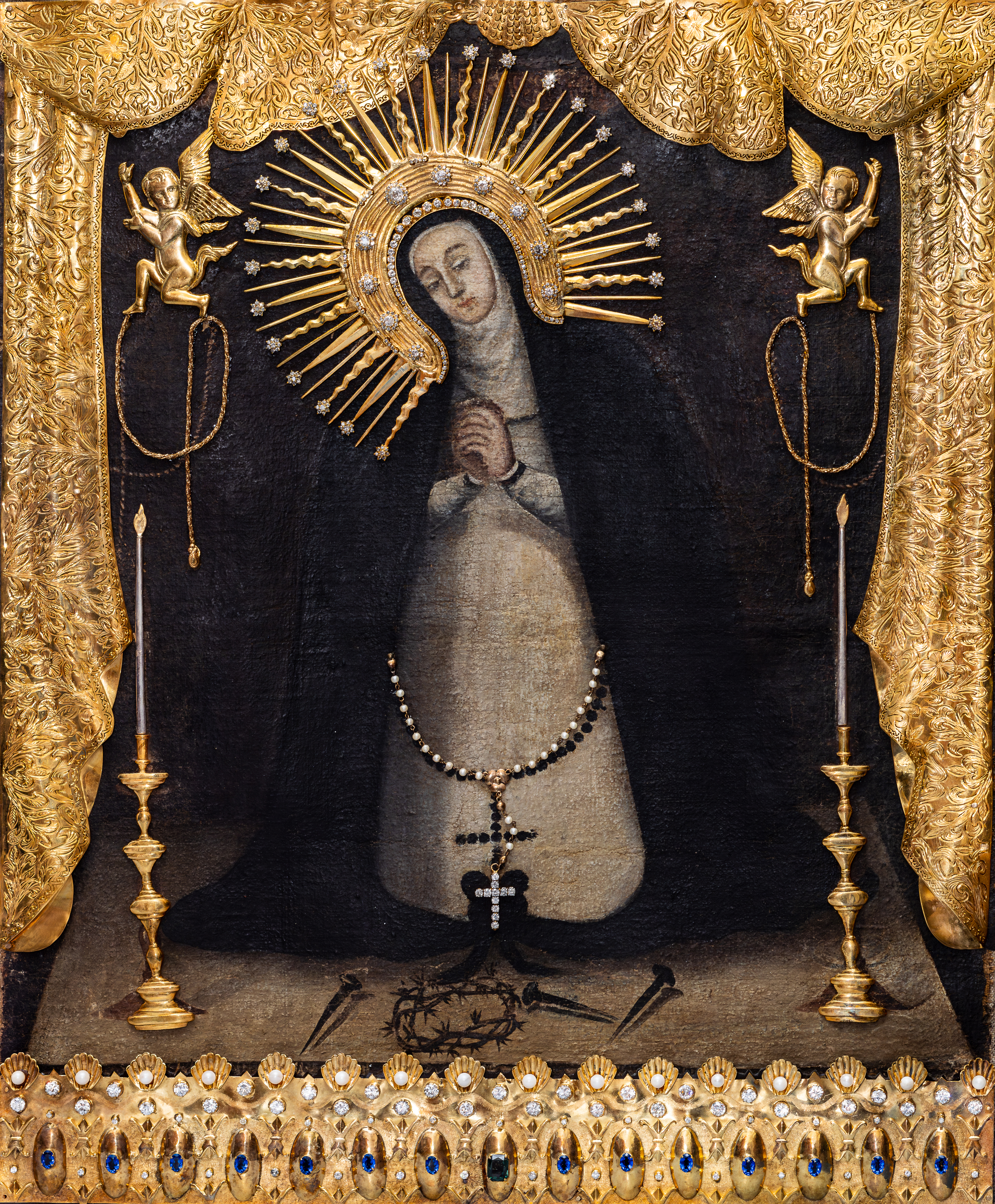
- The original icon
- Location: Cavite City, Philippines
- Date: 1667
- Witness: Spanish Soldier
- Type: Marian apparition
- Approval: 19 March 2018, Canonical coronation by Pope Francis
- Venerated in: Catholic Church; Philippine Independent Church
- Shrine: Diocesan Shrine of Our Lady of Solitude of Porta Vaga, Church of San Roque, Cavite City, Philippines (current, 1945–present); Church of Ermita de Porta Vaga, Cavite Puerto, Captaincy General of the Philippines, Spanish Empire (previous, destroyed during the Second World War, 1692–1941)
- Patronage: Province of Cavite; Cavite City; Galleons; Navigators; Travellers; Sailors; Vocations; Marines; Navy; Tahanan ng Mabuting Pastol Seminary, Tagaytay
- Attributes: Oil painting on canvas approx. 18-1/8" x 14-3/4"; Aureola with 24 stars made from diamonds. a Rosary, made from pearls and a Cross of diamonds. Crown of Thorns and Nails symbols of Christ's Passion. Gold and silver Riza in the shape of candle sticks, angels, Curtains, Shells and multiple precious gems.
- Feast day: 2nd and 3rd Sunday of November

Our Lady of Solitude of Porta Vaga (Spanish: Nuestra Señora de la Soledad de Porta Vaga, Filipino: Mahal na Birhen ng Soledad ng Porta Vaga), also known as the Virgin of a Thousand Miracles, is a Roman Catholic Marian title of Mary, mother of Jesus, following a Marian apparition in 1667 to a Spanish soldier during a night storm as he was posted at the Porta Vaga of Puerto de Cavite. Later the next day, the icon was discovered on the shores of Cañacao Bay. The Virgin of Soledad is a venerated Marian icon associated to the Our Lady of Solitude. The province of Cavite and the city of Cavite consider her patroness.

The oldest dated Marian painting in the Philippines, the icon is permanently enshrined at the Diocesan Shrine of Our Lady of Solitude of Porta Vaga, Church of San Roque.

The image was ceremoniously crowned on 17 November 1978, though the act was disputed as illegitimate for lack of recognition by the Holy See. On 27 September 2017, the image was designated a National Cultural Treasure of the Philippines. On 19 March 2018, new documents were submitted to the Holy Office, and the image was granted an official decree of canonical coronation by Pope Francis.

== Title and description ==
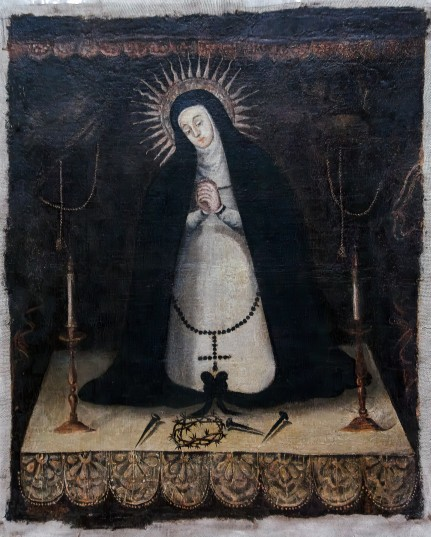
The original icon after its restoration without any ornaments

The image is known in its province as the "Queen of the City and Province of Cavite" and "Exalted Patroness and the Celestial Guardian and Protectress of the Province of Cavite and its Port" (Spanish: Reina de la Ciudad y Provincia de Cavite and La Excelsa Patrona y La Celestial Guardiana y Protectora de la Provincia de Cavite y su Puerto). The icon was used to bless departing trade galleons plying the route between Cavite and Acapulco, Mexico, earning her the title "Patroness of the Galleons", while claims of miracles associated the icon as "The Virgin of a Thousand Miracles". According to historical records, the image is sometimes called "Mother of Candles" ("Ynang Magkakandila") due to her prayerful iconography of two candles, hundreds of bottles of candles was offered in front of the image in the weeks of her festival in Cavite. Accordingly, a separate feast was celebrated supported and funded by candle makers in gratitude for their income from the recent days feast. The youth also calls the image affectionally as "Nay Choleng" (Mother Choleng) using the name "Choleng" a pseudonym of "Soledad".

The Blessed Virgin Mary is depicted as garbed in black and white, kneeling before the instruments of Passion of Jesus Christ. The icon is painted on canvas and framed in carved wood. The painting itself is set in gold and silver accoutrements of precious gemstones donated as ex votos from devotees.

A Spanish inscription on the reverse of the icon reads:

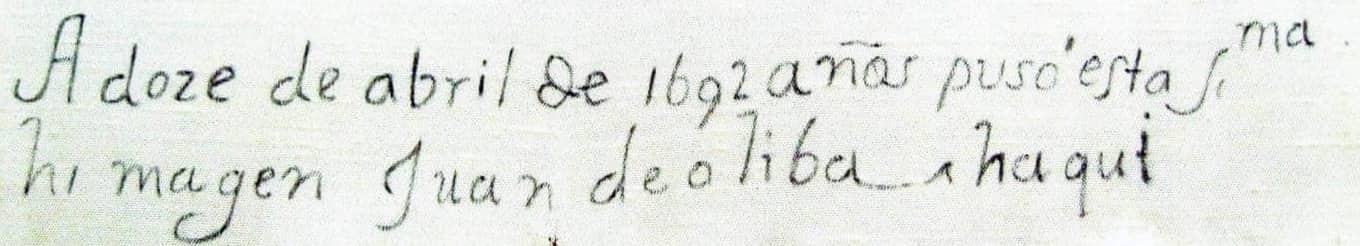
Tracing of the inscription on the reverse of the icon.

Spanish language: "A 12 de Abril 1692 años, Juan Oliba puso esta Santissima Ymagen Haqui."
(English: "On the 12th of April, 1692, Juan Oliba placed this most holy image here.")

== Historical timeline ==
=== 1600s ===
- 1602 – The Spaniards constructed a massive wall protecting the port town of Cavite. With this wall was a main gate which gave entry to Cavite Puerto, which was labelled on a 1659 map as "puerta nueva que sales a San Roque". In Chabacano dialect, it was called Puertang Bago, with Bago ("new”) transformed to the more hispanic Vaga, hence Porta Vaga.
- 1667 – Tradition says a miraculous lady appeared before a soldier of the Guardia Civil. Identifying herself as Mary, mother of Jesus, she sought entrance through Porta Vaga to Cavite Puerto. The next day, fishermen and workers at the Cavite Royal Arsenal found the image of the Virgen de la Soledad floating on the waters of Cañacao Bay.
- 1669 – 1689 Tomás de Andrade, rector of the Jesuit Colegio de Cavite, wrote the poem Himno a la Virgen de Cavite. This became the lyrics of the hymn, Reina de Cavite.
- 1692 April 12 – An inscription on the back of the painting states "A doze de Abril 1692 años puso S.ima himagen Juan de Oliba haqui ("On the twelfth of April the year 1692 this most holy image was placed by Juan de Oliba here"). This date was the basis for Nuestra Señora de la Soledad's Tricentennial celebrations.

=== 1700s ===
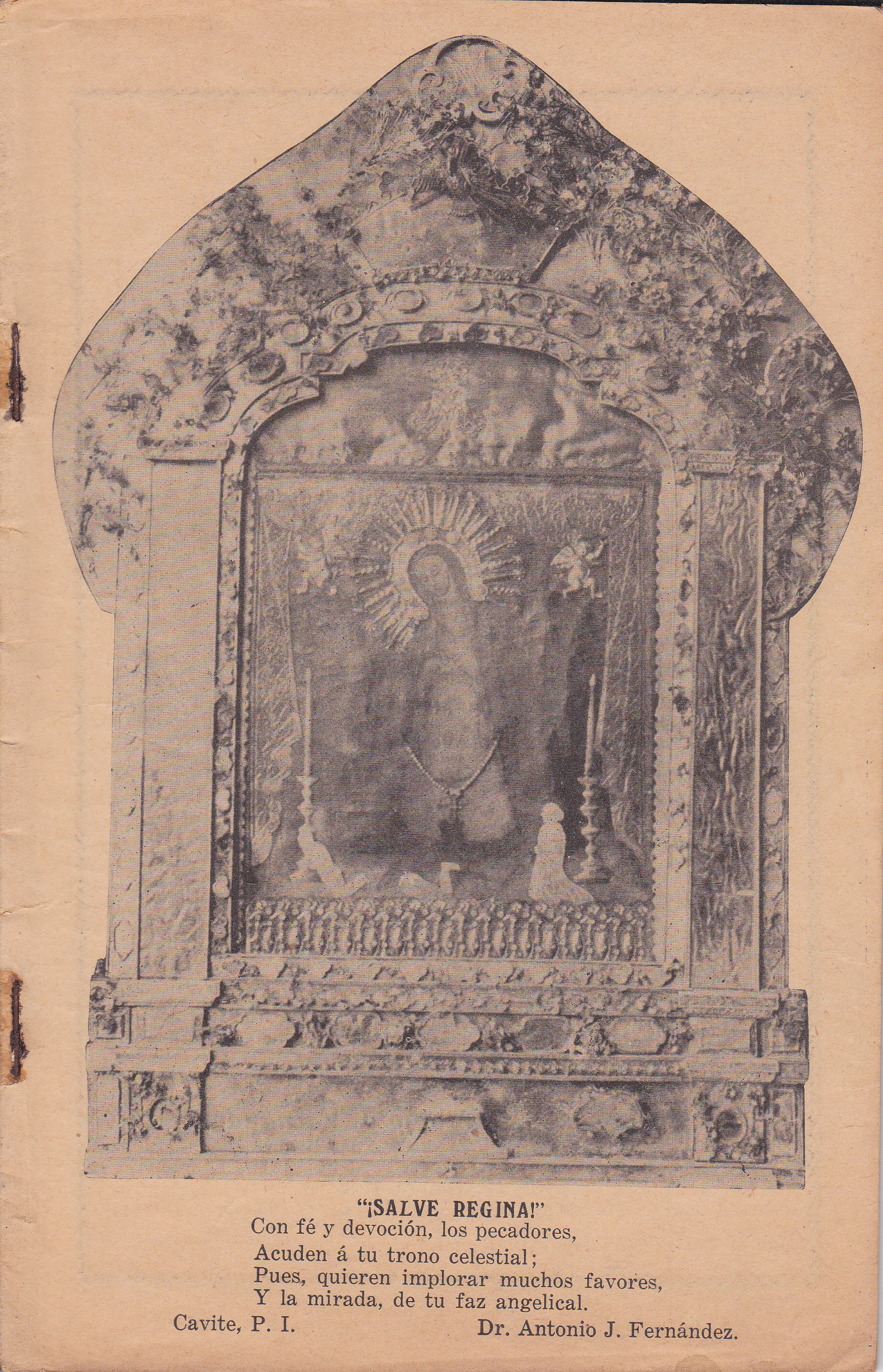
Original Spanish-era frame of Our Lady of Porta Vaga

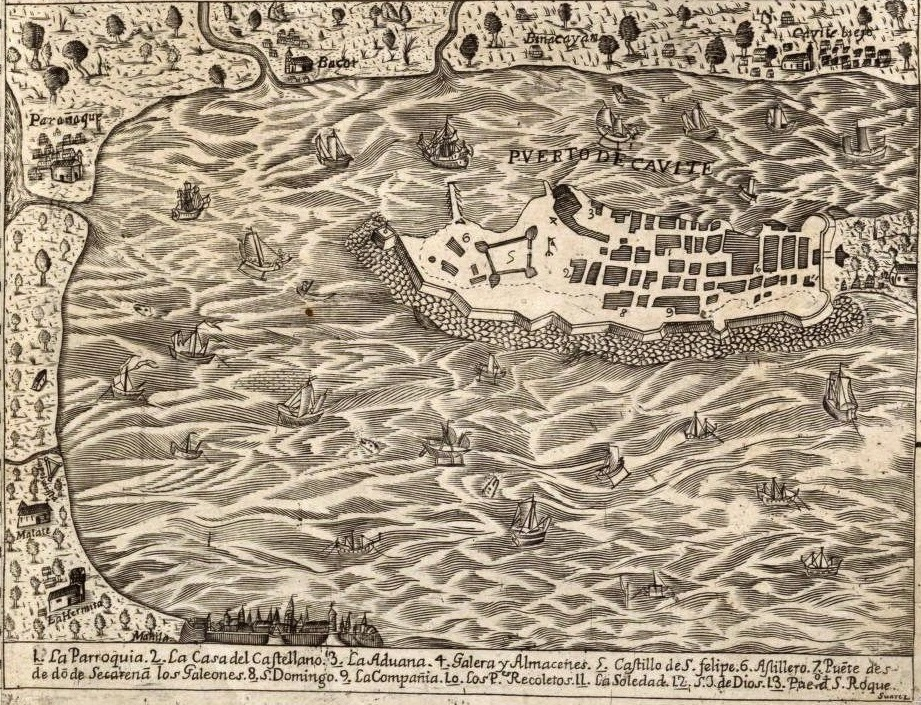
Port of Cavite, detail from Carta Hydrographica y Chorographica de las Yslas Filipinas (1734). Listed on the map as "11. La Soledad" is the Ermita de Porta Vaga.

- 1739 – The first time that the Ermita de la Virgen de la Soledad is mentioned in the map of Cavite Puerto.
- 1739 – The chaplain of the Ermita de la Soledad was Nicolás Melo.
- 1739 (October 5) – Marcos Zamora was appointed as administrator of the Capilla Nuestra Señora de la Soledad. He was asked to submit an inventory of the properties of the said chapel.
- 1742 – Soledad Patrocinante de María, Oración Evangélica de Nuestra Señora de la Soleded apellidada de Puerta Vaga was printed. This was based on the preaching given by the Dominican preachers Fray Juan de la Cruz in the Ermita de la Soledad in 1741.
- 1747 (December 16) – Vicente de Segueyra was appointed chaplain of the Ermita de Nuestra Señora de la Soledad.
- 1748 (January 22) – de Segueyra asked Don Patricio de Mena, Rear Admiral of the ship Príncipe de Asturias, to ask for alms in his trip to China and Canton for the said sanctuary, the Ermita de la Soledad. This was approved by Basílio Tomás Sancho Hernándo, Archbishop of Manila.
- 1751 (January 16) – De Sousa was granted permission by Archbishop Sancho to ask for alms from passengers aboard the ship Santísimo Rosario bound for Acapulco for the greater glory of the cult and adornment of the Nuestra Señora de la Soledad.
- 1752 (July 7) – de Sousa solicited alms for the image of Nuestra Señora de la Soledad aboard Nuestra Señora del Rosario y San Juan Bautista.
- 1755 (November 21) Antonio Gil Adriano was appointed chaplain of the Ermita.
- 1757 (November 6) – A document mentioned the existence of Obras Pías de Nuestra Señora de la Soledad under the administration of Don Miguel Cortés de Arrendenio y Oriosolo, Vicar-General of Manila.
- 1768 (January 17) – José Aranzana was appointed chaplain of the Ermita de la Soledad.
- 1768 (July 20) – Aranzana was given permission to ask for alms for the Virgen de la Soledad aboard the frigate San Carlos.
- 1768 (August 11) – José de Jesús Díaz Vardona was appointed chaplain of the Ermita.
- 1768 (October 1) – Vicente Hipólito was assigned as mayordomo capella of the Ermita.
- 1769 (July 19) – Hipólito was given permission to solicit from the galleon San Carlos.
- 1770 (March 1) - Tomás Nazario Benítez was appointed chaplain of the Ermita.
- 1771 – The sanctuary of the Ermita was painted, while floors, leaks and windows were repaired.
- 1773 (March 1) – Raphael Ochoa was appointed chaplain of the Ermita.
- 1774 (April) – Dionicio Vicente Esguera de Leyba was appointed chaplain of the Ermita.
- 1775 – Archbishop Sancho of Manila approved the rebuilding of the retablo with gold and silver leaf imported from Canton.
- 1775 – 1792 – Don Mateo Joaquín Rubio de Arévalo, Bishop of Cebu, granted 40 days indulgence to devotees of the Virgen de la Soledad. A popular art form were estampas printed on silk, and devotees adorned such copies featuring the Virgin with gold and silver embroidery and ivory.
- 1776 – 1788 – Archbishop Sancho of Manila granted 80 days indulgence to devotees of the Virgen de la Soledad.
- 1787 – An inventory of the Ermita described four altars, much silver vessels and decoration, and curtains of different colors hanging inside.
- 1830 (June 2) – Lightning struck the altar of the Ermita, razing it to the ground, but leaving the image of the Virgin remained intact amidst the ashes and debris.

=== 1800s ===
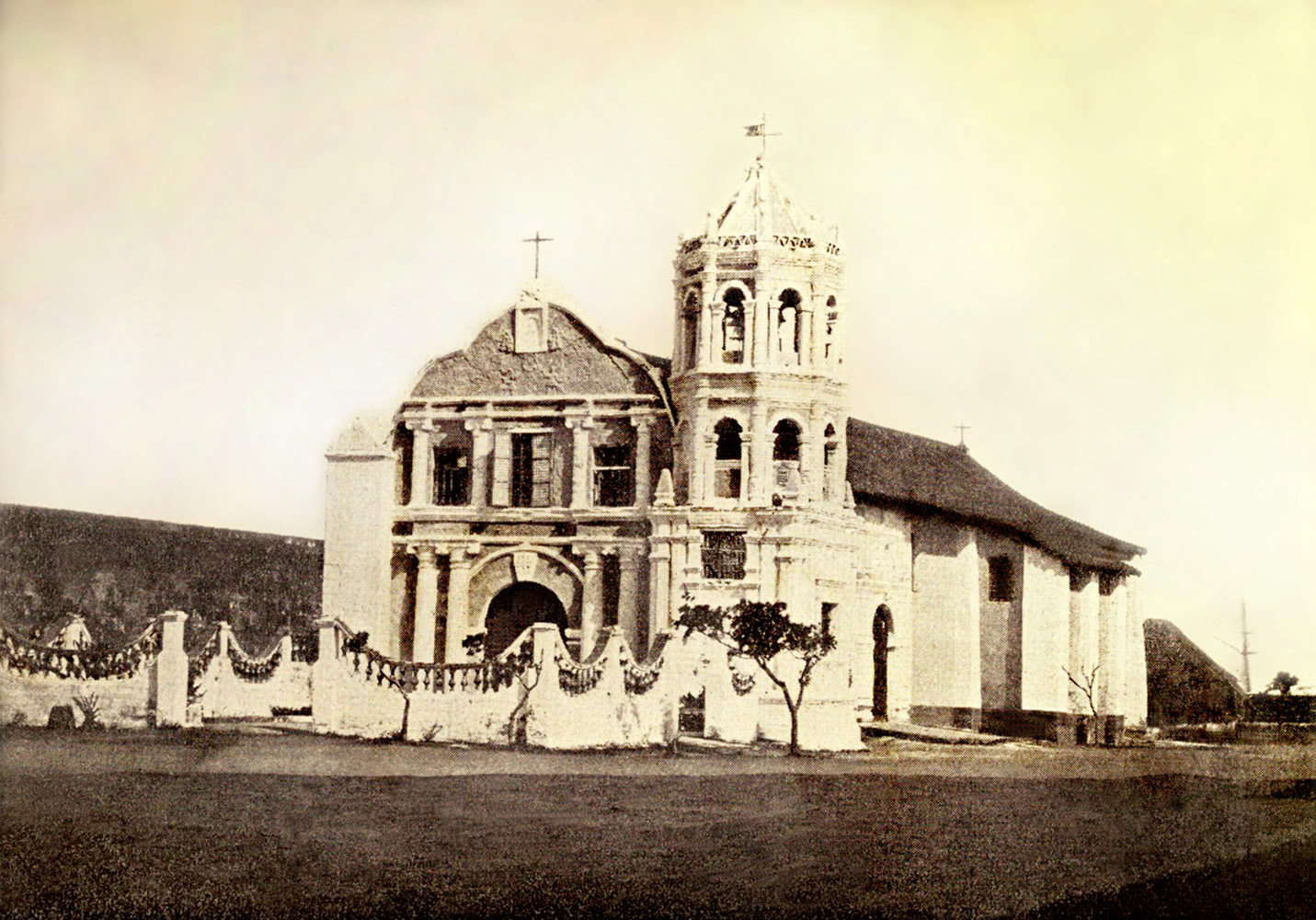
The Ermita de Porta Vaga (Chapel of Porta Vaga) alongside the walls of Cavite, the original shrine of Our Lady of Solitude of Porta Vaga, circa 1899

- 1832 – Novenario Consagrado a la Piadosa Vrigen de la Soledad llamada de Puerta Vaga printed by the Real Colegio de Sto. Tomás, Manila
- 1848 (April 22) – Macario Goco was appointed chaplain of the Ermita.
- 1848 – The church was closed because of its ruinous state and the dome was in danger of collapse. José Julián de Aranguren, Archbishop of Manila, allowed the immediate repair of the chapel.
- 1849 (April 6) - Clemente Custodio was appointed chaplain of the Ermita.
- 1851 – The chapel of Nuestra Señora de la Soledad was reported to be well built. The interior is decorated with paintings showing miracles of the Virgin.
- 1856 – A terrible typhoon flooded Cavite Puerto leaving houses and buildings underwater except for the Ermita and its patio. Caviteños sought refuge there and prayed to the Virgin; the flooding subsided thereafter.
- 1857 (June 30) – Cavite-based Spanish frigate Lucero was caught in a violent typhoon between the shallow reefs off Rauis (now Barangay Rawis) in Legazpi, Albay. The crew asked for the Virgin’s assistance and she appeared to them. After 22 days, the frigate floated away from the reefs and sailed safely to Cavite.
- 1859 (December 22) - Bernardino Tongco was appointed chaplain of the Ermita.
- 1861 (August 31) – Cándido Ureta Manzanares, chancellor of the Archdiocese of Manila, approved the Tagalog novena to the Virgin.
- 1863 – A novena in honor of the Virgen de la Soledad is published by Imprenta Ramírez y Giraudier.
- 1863 (June 3) – The powerful 1863 Manila earthquake, with its epicentre in Manila Bay around 7.74 km north of the Ermita, destroyed the shrine and many other buildings. The image of the Virgen de la Soledad was temporarily housed in San Juan de Dios Church.
- 1865 – Another printing of the novena by the Imprenta de M. Sánchez Calle Anloage Binondo, included a Spanish translation of the Stabat Mater and a prayer in Latin.
- 1869 (July 6) – Timoteo Sánchez was appointed as chaplain of the Ermita.
- 1870 (August 12) – Román Pilapil was appointed as chaplain of the Ermita.
- 1871 – The convent of the Ermita was repaired extensively. Some properties owned by the Ermita were sold to subsidize the expenses.
- 1874 – A running balcony was constructed on the second floor of the sacristy, initiated by Juan Dilag.
- 1879 – A big bell was donated to the Ermita by various devotees of the Virgin. This bell was recast in 1890, and still hangs in the belfry of San Roque Church.
- 1880 – The church was closed due to heavy damage following 1880 Southern Luzon earthquakes. Only the dome and presbytery did not have cracks.
- 1882 (October) – A cholera epidemic spread in Cavite and many residents died. Even the politico-military governor Don Juan Salcedo was afflicted, when an old lady appeared to him. She asked that the fiesta of the Virgen de la Soledad be celebrated with the greatest possible pomp, and the epidemic will subside. After the governor agreed, he was cured and the cholera epidemic was checked.
- 1883 – 1886 – Height of the fiesta, with the whole province participating. Streets covered by the route of the procession were carpeted and canopied and lighted with crystal lanterns.
- 1892 – The fiesta of Cavite was featured in the Spanish newspaper, Manililla. The governor of Cavite, Juan Francisco Rodríguez, opened the Exposición Regional de Cavite. The hymn Reina de Cavite was composed by Julián Felipe, who also composed the Philippine national anthem.

=== 20th century ===
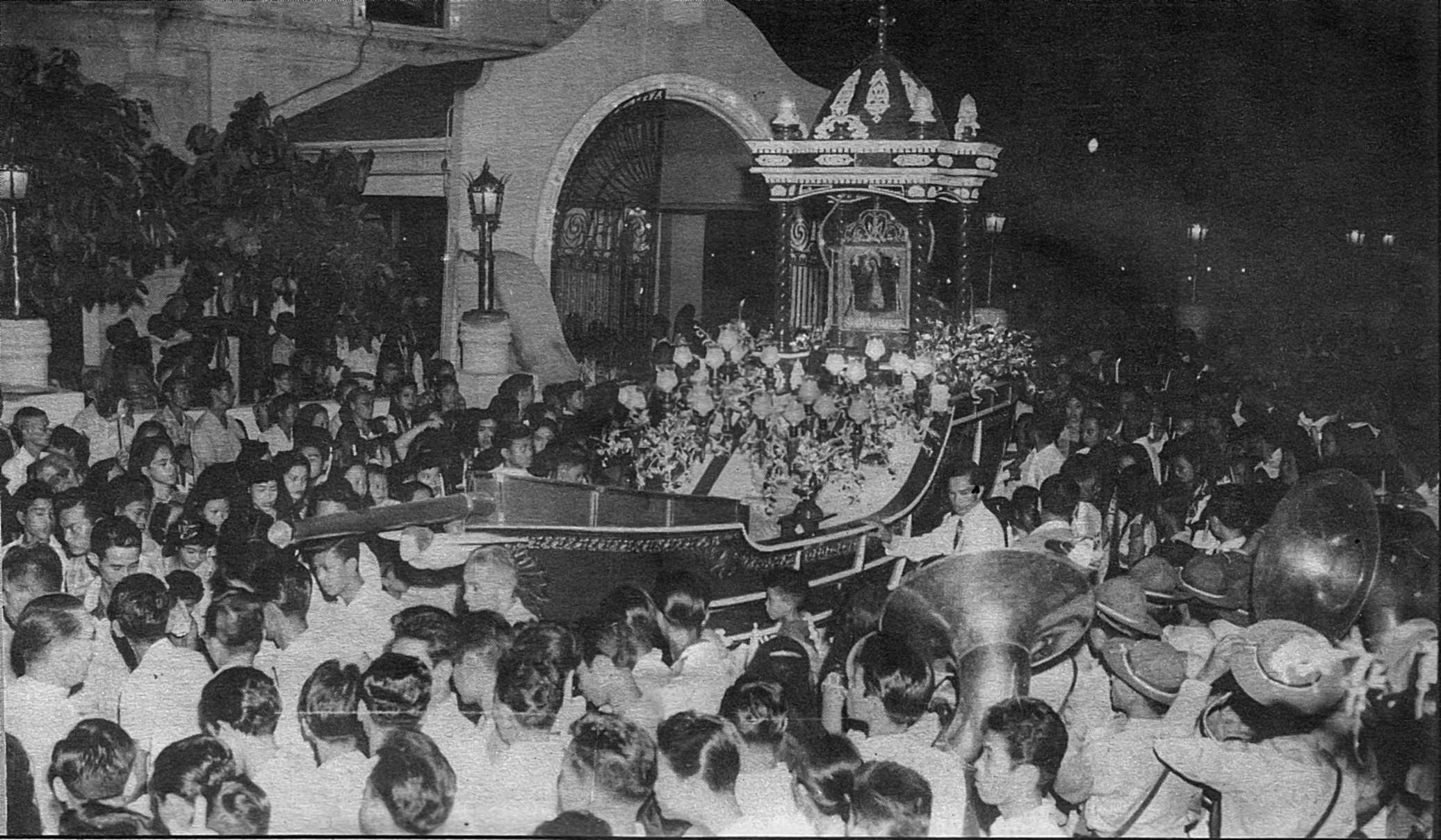
Its Marian Procession in 1955

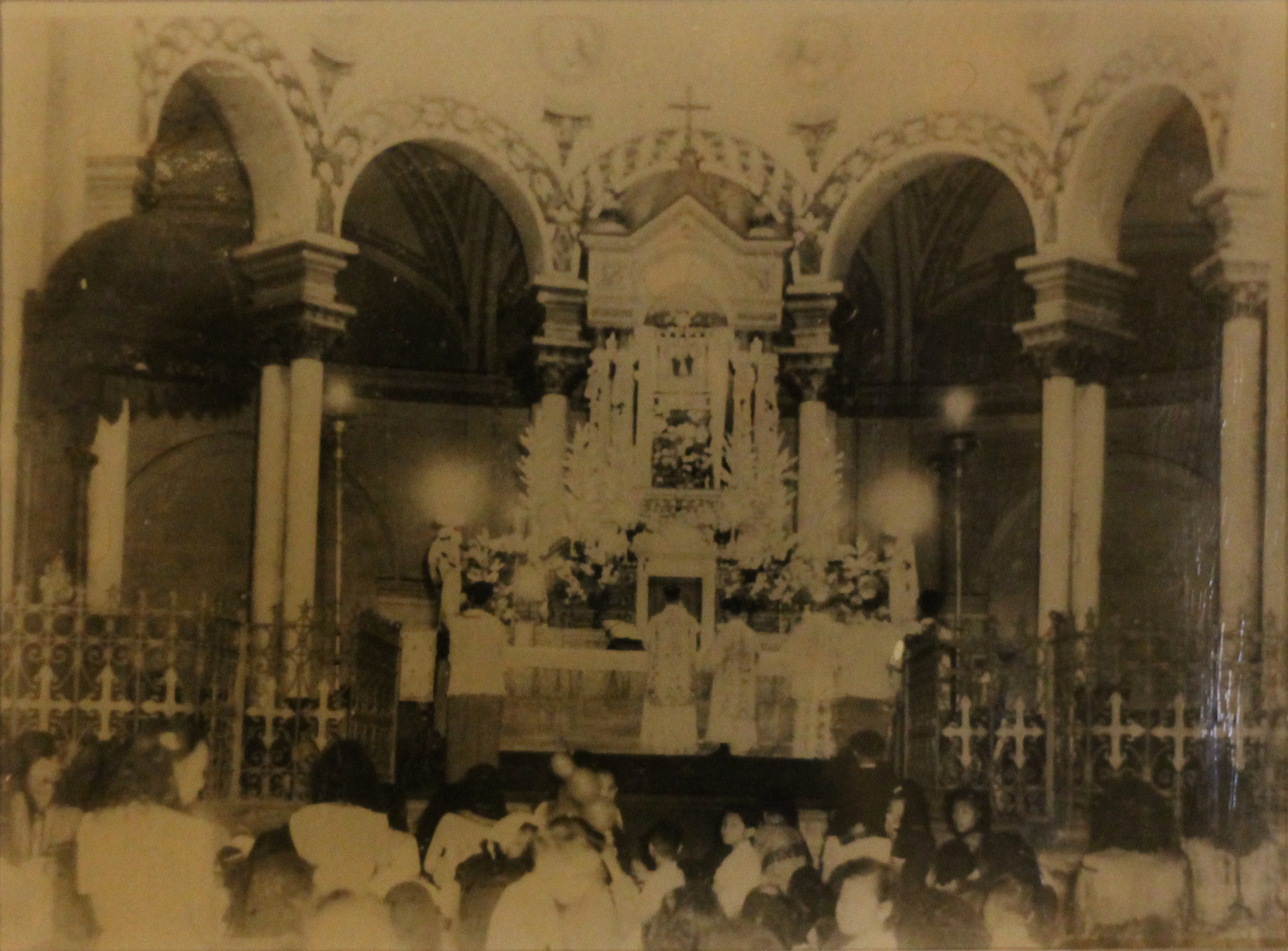
Mass inside the Manila Cathedral celebrating the feast of Our Lady of Porta Vaga

- 1909 (October 21) – the first American Archbishop of Manila Jeremiah James Harty granted 100 days indulgence to those who will make pious devotion to the Virgen de la Soledad.
- 1914 – The fiesta of Cavite was featured in the society magazine, Cultura Social.
- 1929 (June 13) – Pedro Lerena of Logroño, Spain, became the parish priest of San Pedro in Cavite Puerto. He was at the same time appointed as rector of the Ermita. Lerena took care of the Virgin until his death.
- 1932 – Lerena beautified the Ermita. He opened new windows and widened the older ones. He installed a new communion rail made of narra and marble. He also installed electric chandeliers.
- 1941 – 1942 – The Japanese imperial forces entered Cavite. The Ermita de la Soledad was sealed and the image was junked at Sangley Point. Lerena later retrieved the image and brought it to Manila.
- 1942 (November) – The fiesta of the Virgen de la Soledad was celebrated in Quiapo Church.
- 1943 – 1944 (November) – The fiestas of the Virgen were celebrated at Manila Cathedral.
- 1944 – The Ermita was reduced into rubble by American carpet bombings. When the Archbishop's Palace in Intramuros was bombed, the image was kept in one of the vaults of the Philippine National Bank.
- 1945 – What was left of the Ermita was bulldozed. Lerena returned the image of the Virgen de la Soledad to Cavite and enshrined it at San Roque Church.
- 1946 – A small carroza for the procession of the Virgen de la Soledad was made since the old carroza de plata was lost to the war. This new carroza is still used during the caracol of the Virgin.
- 1951 – A miniature galleon was made a carroza of the Virgin for the procession. It is still used to this day.
- 1954 – The image of the Virgen de la Soledad was brought to Luneta for the Marian Year celebration. San Roque Church, the shrine of the Virgin became the venue for the vicarial of the Marian Year.
- 1972 (May 25) – Lerena, the camarera of the Virgin for 47 years, died.
- 1976 – The new parish priest Baraquiel Mjica bought the replica of the Virgen de la Soledad to the different towns of Cavite province to promote the devotion to her.
- 1977 – Exhibits of old souvenir programs of the fiestas of the Virgen and old photos of Cavite were displayed at the patio of San Roque Church during the fiesta.

1978
- (Jun 12) The Our Lady of Solitude Foundation was established from the proceeds of the safe of the Ermita lot.

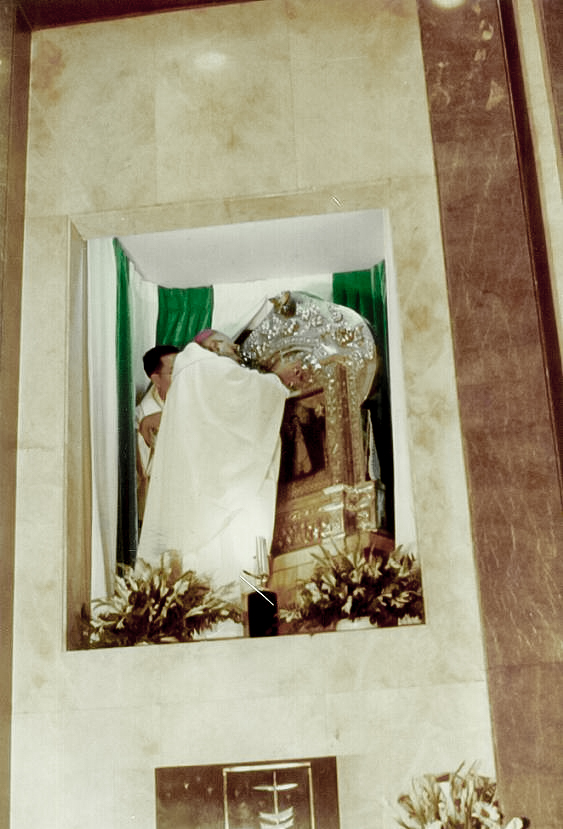
Former Apostolic Nuncio to the Philippines, Bruno Torpigliani crowning the image in 1978

- (November 17) – Apostolic Nuncio Bruno Torpigliani performed her canonical coronation, using a crown donated by Arturo Mañalac.

- 1981 – The story of the Virgen de la Soledad was made into a movie entitled Ang Milagro sa Porta Vaga (lit. 'The Miracle at Porta Vaga'). Sor Agustina Salcedo, the granddaughter of Don Juan Salcedo, authored the script.

=== Theft and recovery ===
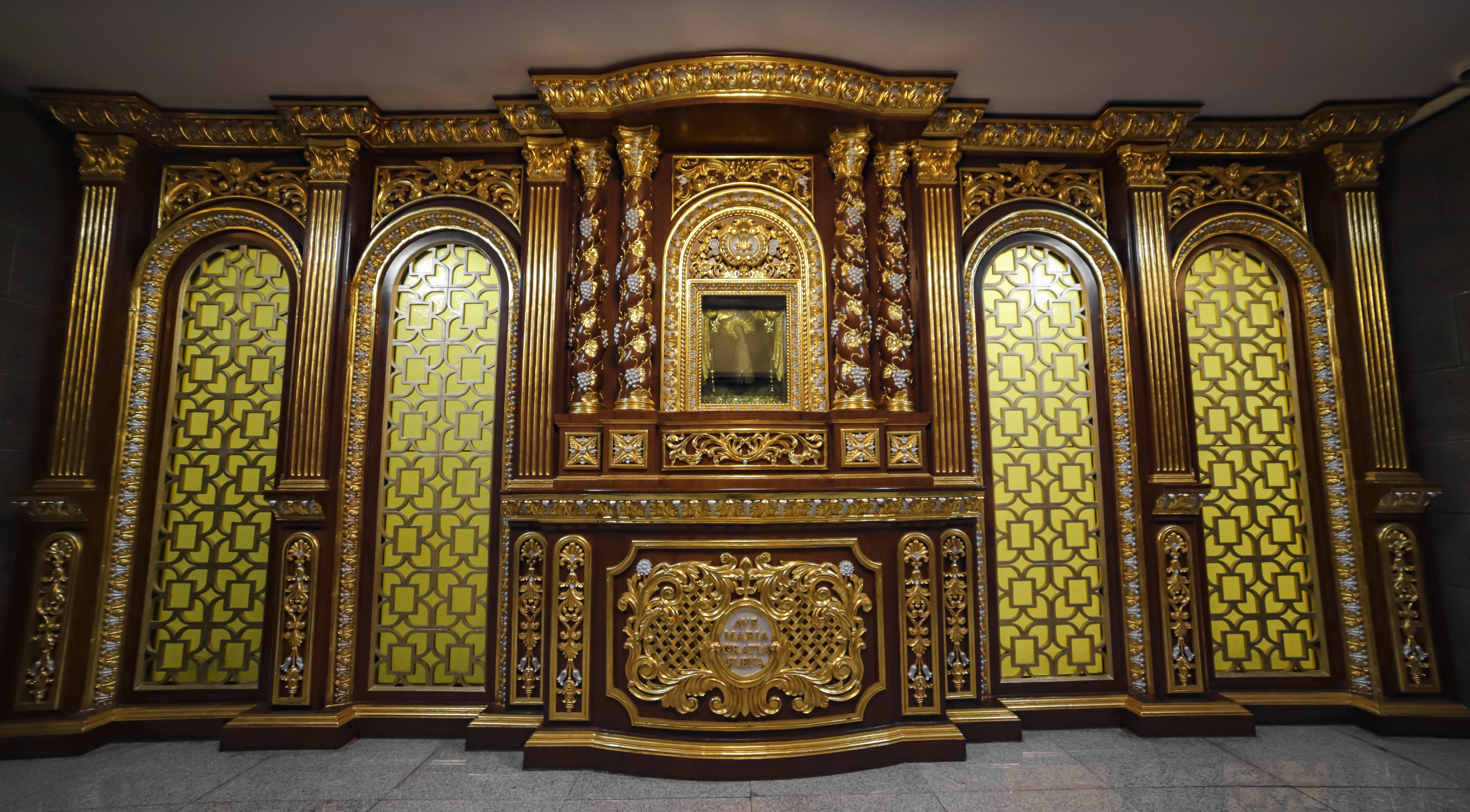
The "Camarín" where the original image is now kept for security, preservation, and veneration.

1984
- (March 16) – The image was stolen from her altar in San Roque Church.
- (August 15) – The image was retrieved by Antonio G. Nazareno and had it authenticated by church authorities.
- (August 19) The bishop announced the recovery of the authentic image.

- 1990 – Preparatory stage of the Tricentennial Celebration initiated by Felix Perez. The image of the Virgin made a sentimental visit to Quiapo Church.
1991
- April 12 – Solemn opening to the Tricentennial Celebration

- May 12 First grand Marian Procession held in Cavite in honor to the Virgen de la Soledad. It was participated by more than 42 images of the Virgin.

- June – July – The replica of the Virgin de la Soledad was brought to the United States to visit Caviteño communities.

- September – Oct – the delegation from Cavite brought the image of the Virgin back to the United States upon the fervent request of her other devotees.

- October – A Marian Congress was held in San Roque in honoring the Virgen de la Soldead. A perpetual Rosary devotion was held before the image of the Virgen de la Soledad.

- October 19 – Development Foundation was launched at the Manila Hotel with the Ambassadors of Spain and Mexico as guests.

- November 1991 – The image of the Nuestra Señora de la Soledad in Barrio Soledad (now Camba in Binondo) was brought to Cavite City. The image must have been brought by the Caviteños who settled in that particular place in Binondo. It has been venerated in Camba since 1887.

- November 1991 – The Historical Marker commemorating the Tricentennial of the Enthronement of the Soledad was unveiled by Bishop Felix Perez of Imus and Mayor Timoteo Encarnacion of Cavite City at the former site of the Ermita de Porta Vaga. The Marker was granted by the National Historical Institute upon the approval of Director Serafn Quiazon.
1992
- December 1991 – The century-old Maytinis of Kawit, Cavite representing the different personalities in the Bible through colorful floats was re-enacted in CaviteCity in honor of the Soledad. It is traditionally held in Cavite on the eve of Christmas.

- February 1992 – The original image of Nuestro Padre Jesus Nazareno made a sentimental visit to the shrine of the Soledad. It was the first time that the said image was brought out of Quiapo to the place where it first landed over three hundred years ago. The most emotional part of the visit was when the Soledad met the Nazareno at the junction of Ronquillo Street. The Sorrowful Mother meeting the Suffering Son.

- March 1992 – The Soledad Visual Art Competition was held. Many young Caviteño artists participated painting the Soledad.

- April 1992 – A press conference was held in Cavite City on the Porta Vaga Festival in celebration of the Tricentennial of the Soledad. Over 30 press people from Manila were ferried to Cavite. Alter a tour to Cavite's historical sites, the members of the press were treated with a sumptuous Caviteño lunch and a press conference was followed.

- April 12, 1992 – The Soledad Tableau was presented by high school students in San Roque Parish Church. The tableau re-enacted the apparition and the coronation of the Soledad.

- April 24, 1992 – the commemorative stamps issued by the Philippine Postal Services office on Apr 12 1992 was formally presented to Mayor Tim Encarnation and Pedro Arigo, the Diocesan administrator of Cavite. The stamp was designed by Rafael Asuncion and approved by the Postmaster General Jorge Sarmiento. Four hundred thousand stamps were issued under two denominations.
- April 24, 26 – The closing ceremonies to the Tricentennial celebration dubbed as Porta Vaga '92 was held at the former site of the Ermita de Porta Vaga. It was a 3-day religious-cultural celebration honoring the Soledad.

=== 21st century ===
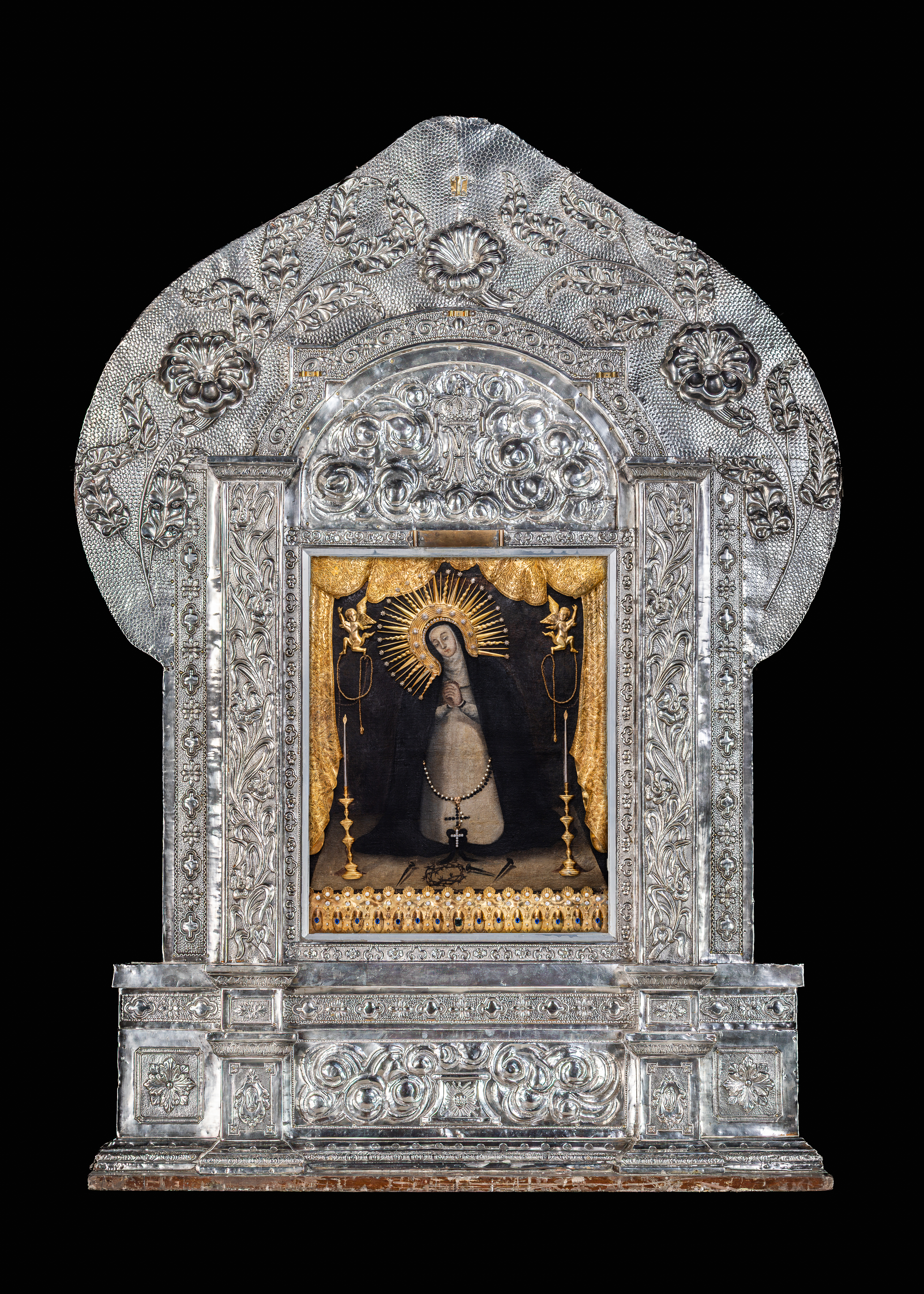
The image in her present silver frame, minus ornamentation, 2021

2017

the 350th Anniversary of the Arrival of the Original icon in the shores of Cavite.

- July 21- Nomination of the Image thru a letter address to Director Jeremy Barns of the National Museum.
- August 30- Stakeholders Meeting and Public Hearing for the Nomination of the image as National Cultural Treasure.
- September 28 – The panel of Experts unanimously approved the NCT nomination.
- November 19 - the four venerated images of Our Lady of Solitude of Buhi from Albay, Nueva Ecija, Camba, Manila, and the Estampa image From the Tahanan ng Mabuting Pastol Seminary in Tagaytay, was brought together for the first time in Cavite, and graced the streets of Cavite City in a grand procession.

2018
- 18 November – Canonical Coronation of La Virgen de la Soledad de Porta Vaga officiated by Gabrielle Giordanno Caccia, the Apostolic Nuncio to the Philippines. The solemn ceremonies enacting the Papal act was jointly presided by Archbishop Gabriele Giordano Caccia, Papal Nuncio to the Philippines, and Bishop Reynaldo G. Evangelista, D.D., Bishop of Imus, on 18 November 2018.

- 24 November – Public declaration of the image of La Virgen de la Soledad de Porta Vaga as National Cultural Treasure; Hon. Gemma Cruz-Araneta gave the keynote speech.

- 12 April 2019 – Unveiling of the Marker of the image as NCT. According to Gemma Cruz-Araneta, former director of the National Museum, this was the first time an ecclesiastical artifact was declared a national cultural treasure.

== Miraculous claims and apparition ==
According to local legend, a Spanish carabinero soldier on sentry duty on the Rosario isthmus one stormy night saw a halo of bright light amongst storm clouds above Cañacao Bay. Thinking the light to be from Islamic pirates intent on sacking Cavite, the sentry shouted a challenge to the light as they approached him. When the light did not stop, he again called out. A calm and soothing voice replied from the light:

"Soldadito, ¿por qué el alto me das en noche tan fría? Dame paso. ¿No conoces a María?"
(Little soldier, why do you stop me on a night so cold? Let me pass. Do you not know Mary?)

The soldier, struck with awe and confusion, replied:

"Perdónadme, Virgen María, Reina de mi devoción; ¡pues solo soy un soldado que cumplo mi obligación!"
(Forgive me, Virgin Mary, Queen of my devotion; for I am a poor soldier abiding by his duty.")

The morning followed the stormy night. The early risers, mostly fishermen and workers at the Cavite Royal Arsenal usually passed through the Porta Vaga gate in entering the port. Along the beach of Cañacao Bay, they found a framed image of the Virgen de la Soledad lying on the sandy shore, near where the Virgin had appeared the previous night. Others claimed it came with the debris of a Spanish galleon that sank during the fierce typhoon. They brought the image to the parish priest, who temporarily installed it in the parish church. Later, a small chapel was built near the Porta Vaga walls and for three centuries it became the shrine of the Virgen de la Soledad.

An inscription was found at the back of the painting: "A doze de Abril 1692 años Juan de Oliba puso esta Stsma. Ymagen Haqui."("This sacred image was placed here on April 12, 1692 by Juan Oliva"). It does not give an exact date of the Virgin's arrival, and it is possibly when the image was enthroned at the altar of the Ermita de Porta Vaga in the 17th century. Devotees of the Virgen de la Soledad were not satisfied in placing her in one of the seven churches of Cavite Puerto. They decided to build for her the Ermita de Porta Vaga, a small chapel near the gate of the Porta Vaga, the fortlet guarding the entrance to the Puerto de Cavite. For three centuries, it became the shrine of the Virgin.

- During the typhoon in 1830, a fire caused by lightning bolt hit the wooden altar of the Ermita and razed the chapel to the ground, but the image of the Virgin remained intact among the ashes.
- In 1856, another terrible typhoon flooded the houses, churches and public buildings within the Puerto but the Ermita, as well as its patio were found dry so the people took refuge in the Church.
- On 30 June 1857, a Spanish frigate based in Cavite and named Lucero was caught by a violent typhoon off the coast of Albay. It ran aground on the rocky place known as Rawis, Legaspi. For twenty two days, the ship was unable to move not only because of the low tide, but also because of the absence of even a slight breeze. The crewmen were worried because their provision was running low. It happened that one of the crew members was a devotee of the Virgen de la Soledad. He took out Her picture and asked his fellow sailors to pray before Her. One night, the Virgin appeared before the crewmen in the light of the pale moon. As they fell to their knees, the tide rose higher and higher and the wind began to blow. The frigate floated free from its rocky trap and was able to return safely to Cavite. There was so much jubilation. As the crewmen set foot on the ground, they proceeded right away to the Ermita. There, to the tune of the Te Deum, they expressed their gratitude to the Virgin.
- An epidemic plagued the province of Cavite in October 1882. Provincial governor Don Juan Salcedo Y Mantilla de los Rios ordered that the feast of the image be postponed until the whole province has been freed from such disaster. At one night, when the Governor was sick and resting, he ordered his guards not to let anyone in his quarters. However, to his surprise, an old lady dressed in black, came knocking at his door. The lady asked him to promise to celebrate the feast of the Virgen de la Soledad with greatest pomp for the epidemic to leave. Dismayed at such untimely request, he agreed and gave the lady some silver coins wrapped in a white handkerchief. After the lady left, he summoned his guards and reprimanded them for letting the old lady in. To their surprise, they told him that they saw no one in the vicinity. At once he himself was healed and he immediately visited the Ermita de Porta Vaga to give thanks to the Miraculous Virgin. To his surprise, he saw the silver coins wrapped in white handkerchief in front of the icon, just as he had given it to the lady. In thanksgiving for healing the whole of Cavite from such malady, he ordered that the feast of the Virgin be celebrated on January 20–21, 1883. He required all leaders of localities in the whole province to participate in the celebrations. On the day of the fiesta, the bells of all churches in Cavite rang to pay homage to their Queen. It was likewise answered by canyons from the Fort San Felipe. All gobernadorcillos of all towns of Cavite together with all of their local officials came with their colorful gala uniforms with their own town's brass bands. All roads of the Cavite Puerto were decorated with ornaments. The road going to the Ermita de Porta Vaga was piled up with sederas or temporary stores. The whole route of the Virgin's procession were brightly lighted and carpeted with expensive rugs and were covered overhead by canvasses and sails of boats to protect the participants from getting wet in case of rain.

Philippine writer Genoveva Edroza Matute claims that the grandiose fiesta of San Diego in Rizal's Noli Me Tángere was based on the fiesta celebration of Cavite. Thus, the Virgen de la Soledad was called the "Queen and Patroness" of province of Cavite.

== Theft and return ==
- On 16 March 1984, regular churchgoers discovered the image missing from the altar. Several controversial and unfounded theories regarding the theft were published in some newspapers. A special committee to recover the image was formed, and they announced a cash reward of ₱30,000.00, later raised to ₱50,000.00.
- On 15 August 1984, the "Antique Dealers of the Philippines" and an anonymous person with the pseudonym "Un hijo verdadero de Cavite" ("A true son of Cavite") recovered the lost icon, stripped of its gold accoutrements and gemstones. The Bishop of Imus was asked to authenticate the icon.
- On 19 August 1984, celebrations for the feast of Saint Roch included the blessing of a replica icon. Secretly, it was also the day officials planned to announcement the recovery of the original. At the 9:00 a.m. Mass, the Gospel was read, and the Bishop of Imus blessed the replica. The recovered original was then presented to the congregation.

== National cultural treasure ==
Declaration by museum
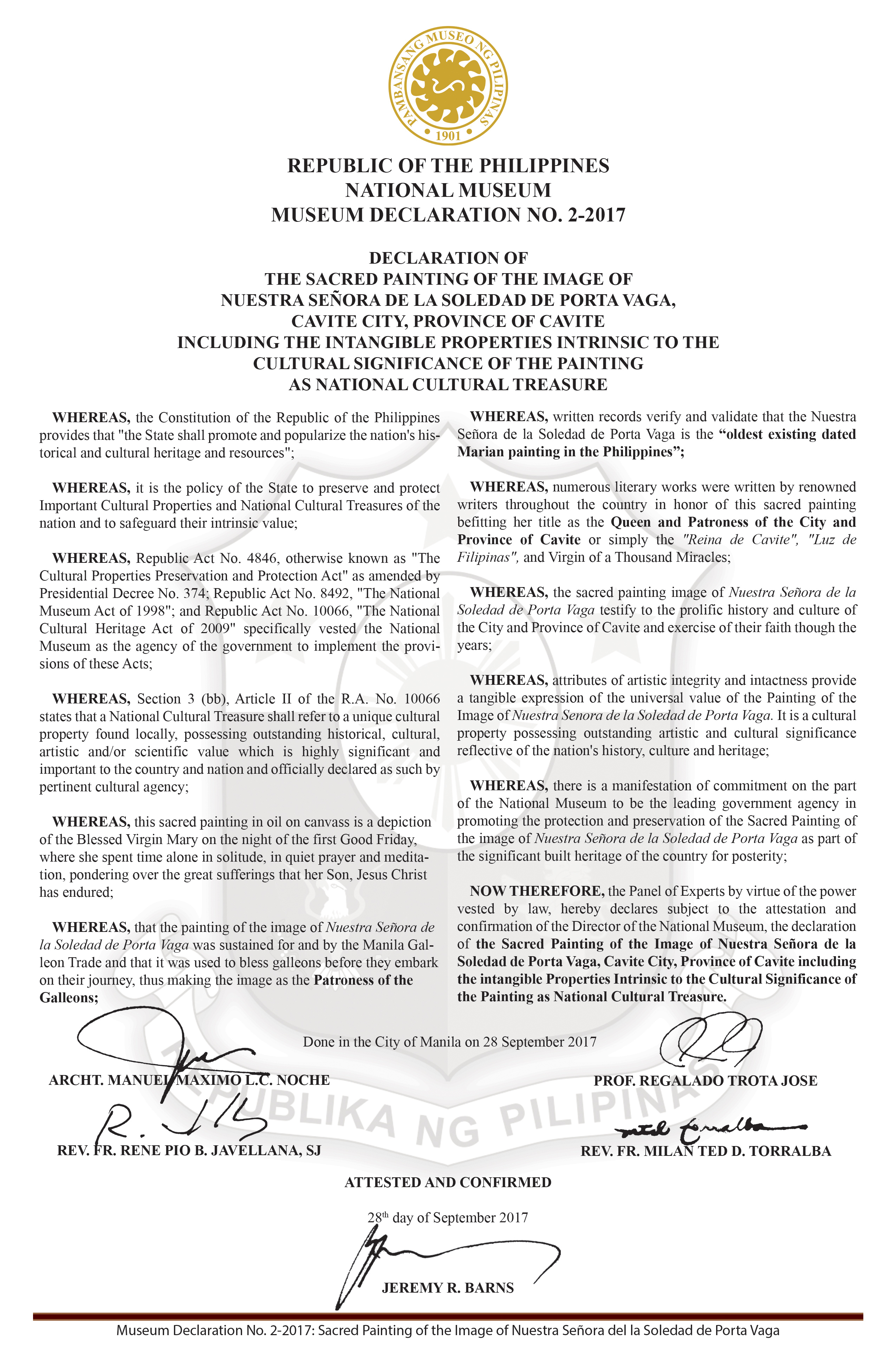
National Museum Declaration no. 2-2017

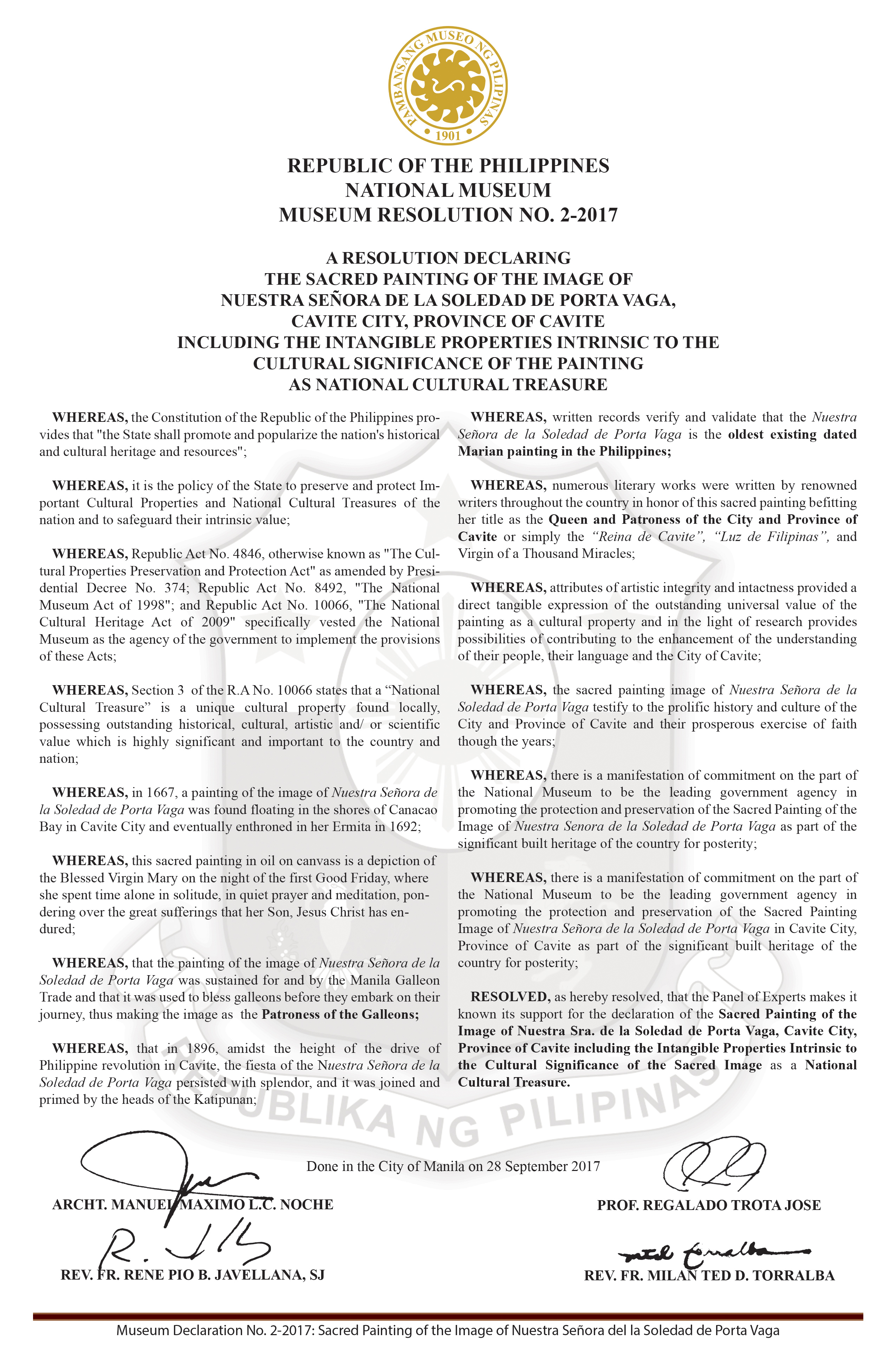
National Museum Resolution no. 2-2017
- In July 2017, the Parish of San Roque, formally nominated the centuries-old image of La Virgen de la Soledad de Porta Vaga as National Cultural Treasure of the Philippine thru the National Museum.
- The local government in August 2017 recognized her image through City Resolution No. – 2017–071. The City Resolution also declared the second Sunday of November as "Dia de la Virgen de la Soledad Porta Vaga" or Our Lady of Porta Vaga Day in the whole city of Cavite.
- On 12 April 2019, the heritage marker was unveiled by the National Museum, city, province and national officials.

== Canonical coronation ==
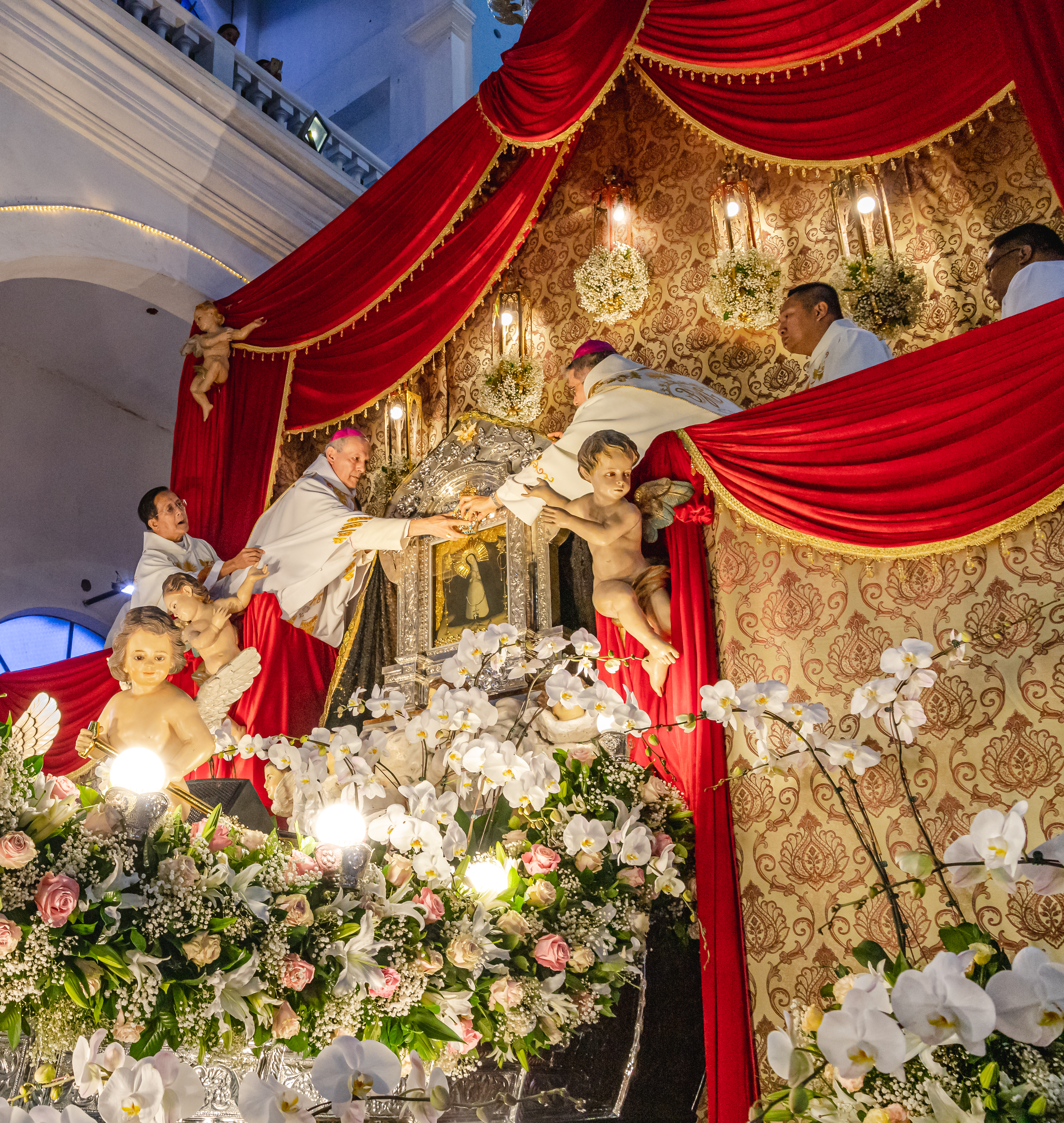
The Pontifical coronation of the image by Apostolic Nuncio Gabriele Giordano Caccia and Reynaldo G. Evangelista

- On 17 November 1978, the Apostolic Nuncio Bruno Torpigliani ceremoniously crowned the image. Decade years of contestation due to lack of pontifical decree since that time accused the coronation as illegitimate. Due to the scandalous infighting, devotees finally succumbed to intensifying scrutiny and public pressure — thereafter formally requested the Vatican for a pontifical decree of coronation.
- On 19 March 2018, Pope Francis issued the decree for the pontifical coronation of the Marian image. The coronation was executed on 18 November 2018 by the Papal Nuncio Gabriele Giordano Caccia. By the same occasion, its church was declared as a Diocesan Shrine. Accordingly, the Apostolic Penitentiary granted plenary indulgence for an entire year for its visitors.

== List of religious devotions ==
The Marian image is celebrated every second and third Sunday of November in Cavite. An annual Lenten rites and the All Saints-All Souls Day observances where she is alluded to in Tagalog as "Ináng Mágkakandila" (Mother Candlemaker).

=== Main fiesta ===
The Fiesta of the Soledad lasts for almost two and a half weeks.

- The Grand Motorcade attended by hundreds of vehicles is held on Friday a day before the karakol at the first fiesta of Our Lady of Solitude, in memory of the return of the original image from theft in 1984. The fun and colorful motorcade entry into the City of Cavite reminds the devotees of the joy of the return of their Mother and Queen and her importance as the Mother of God and of all. At the sound and accompaniment of cheerful music, colorful balloons, banners and confetti the motorcade makes its way to San Roque Parish.
- Karakol Processions are held during town and barangay fiestas in Cavite and some rural areas in The Philippines. It is done mostly on the eve of the feast in thanksgiving for all the blessings and graces received through the intercession of the Patron Saint. Also, some Karakol rituals are done to ask for rain or deliverance from calamities and epidemics. Caracol, which is a species of a snail, refers to the snail-like dance done during these celebrations. It is a fun tradition that dates back from the Spanish era and is still in practice to the present within the province. In Cavite City, the Karakol has two parts as follows: the first being the Caracol de la Tierra and Caracol del Mar. Caracol de la Tiera or the Karakol sa Lupa is the usual Karakol Procession done as Cavite's towns and cities in celebration of village or municipal festivals. The Caracol del Mar or Karakol sa Dagat is a fluvial procession wherein the image of the Virgin is brought back to the open waters of Manila Bay where She was found floating in the year 1667. It is also done, to ask for Her blessing since Cavite City has fishing as one of its main sources of livelihood.
- A recent addition to the fiesta is the Translacion commemorating the events of the feast on November 8, 1896, during the historic Battle of Binakayan-Dalahican during the opening months of the Philippine Revolution. Revolutionary soldiers of the Magdiwang faction based in what is now General Trias brought the original image from Cavite City and celebrated the feast of Our Lady in the premises of St. Francis of Assisi Parish Church in the city proper, away from Spanish naval artillery fire and gunfire from both Spanish and Filipino soldiers. The commemoration starts at the Diocesan Shrine with a motorcade to the St. Francis of Assisi Parish Church, where a welcome Mass is held followed by an overnight vigil. In the following day another mass is held followed by another procession going back to Cavite City by foot, wherein the image of the Virgin is escorted by devotees.
- The "Primera Fiesta" is dedicated for Pilgrims and devotees nationwide.
- The "Segunda Fiesta" - the Third Sunday of November, is dedicated to residents of Cavite Province and a procession of the patron saints of different parishes and chapels of Cavite City and those from the province itself caps the grand festival.

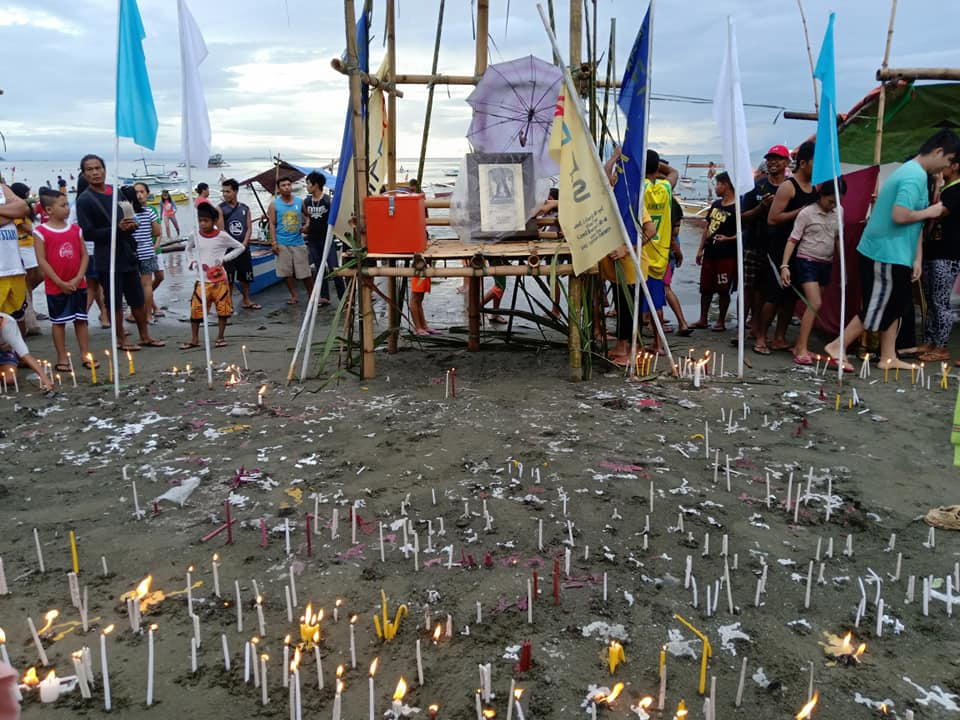
Candles offered at a makeshift altar or "kubol" by the bay at the 2018 "Soleda" Festival Sta. Margarita, Calbayog, Samar

- There has had been a third Festival Sunday - "Tercera Fiesta" - in the past to mark the conclusion of the celebrations, it was officially revived in 2023. It is now sorely offered to the people of Cavite City as the Segunda Fiesta is dedicated to the people of the province that has called Her its protector.

==== Soleda festival in Samar ====
The Soleda festival is a less popular but a more traditional celebration of residents from Sta. Margarita and Barangay Matobato in Calbayog Samar about merry dancing at the shores bearing the image of Nuestra Senora de Porta Vaga, more popularly known as "Soleda". This festival is specially pursued and initiated by the descendants of the early settlers in the community called "Tagalugan" referring to Tagalog speaking migrants from Cavite City during the Spanish era. The celebration is prominently highlighted by the presence of "kubol" or sea-shanties made up of bamboo and coconut palm leaves. The devotees dance their way from the local Chapel as they bring out the image and pass by the different "kubols" until reaching the main "kubol" where a simple ceremony is conducted. The date of celebration though is not very prominent because of the confusion of the actual festival day which falls every second Sunday of November.

=== Procesión del Silencio (Procession of Silence) ===
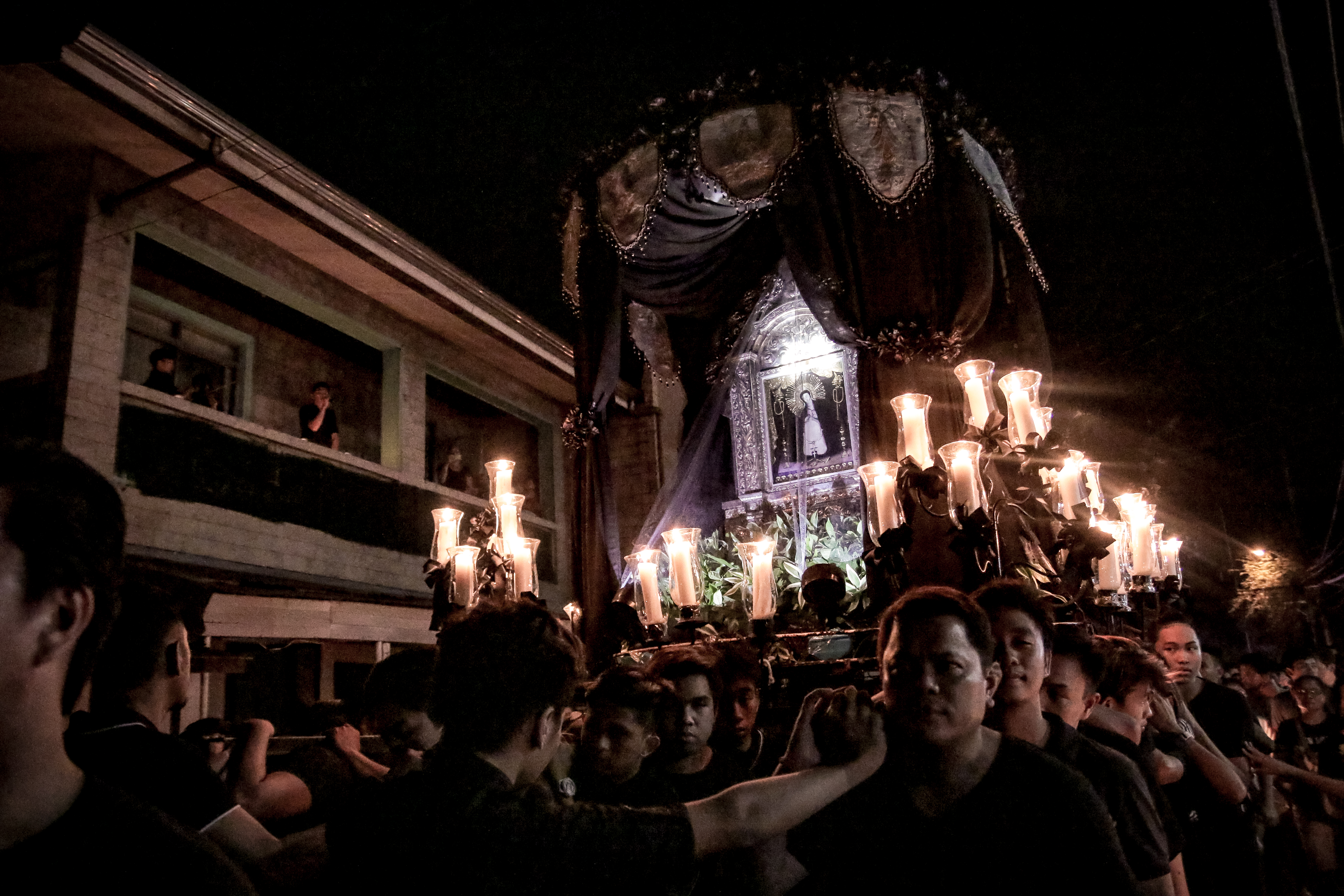
On Good Friday a silent procession marks the faithful who wear black garments and walk barefooted accompanies the sorrowing icon.

As one final salvo to the celebrations of Good Friday, devotees of the Virgen de la Soledad come out after the traditional Santo Sepulcro Procession for a time of penance and prayer in the Procession del Silencio de la Virgen de la Soledad. Devotees, mostly clad in black, barefoot and silently praying with their candles in hand, accompany the icon of the Virgen de la Soledad on a short route to symbolize the Virgin's bringing Christ's body to the Holy Sepulchre. This procession is meant for believers to give consolation to the Virgin. The icon of the Virgen de la Soledad is a depiction of the Virgin Mary on the night of the first Good Friday, where she is supposed to have spent time alone in solitude after the Christ's death. Thus the evening procession is supposed to remind this.

=== Novena ===
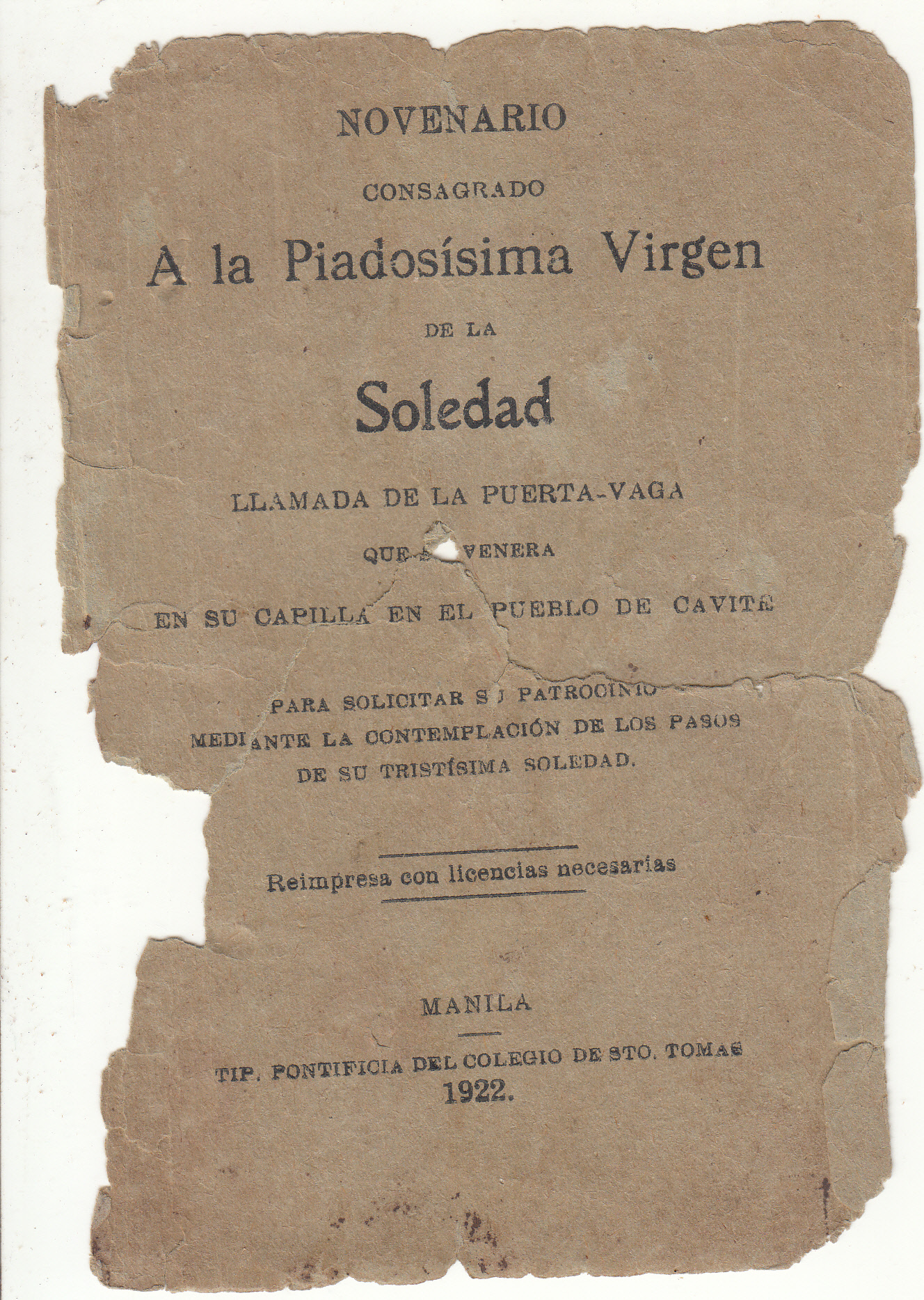
Novenario Consagrado a la Piadosa Virgen de la Soledad llamada de Puerta Vaga printed by the Real Colegio de Sto. Tomas, Manila

The origin of the novena claim that some of its prayers may have been taken from a 1742 religious booklet titled "Soledad patrocinante de Maria. Oracion evangelica de Nuestra Señora de la Soledad, appelida de la Puerta Vaga" (English: Under the patronage of the Mary of Solitude, with the prayers of propagation of Our Lady of Solitude, under the name of the Open Gate); preached in 1741 by the Dominican priest Juan de la Cruz, a Christian missionary in China.

In the 19th century, a Tagalog translation of this Novena was made by Juan Dilag, a chaplain of the Ermita. On 31 August 1861, the chancellor of the Archdiocese of Manila, Don Candido Ureta de Manzares approved the Tagalog translation with the following decree:

"We attach herewith to act as Imprimatur to print in the Tagalog language manuscript entitled Pagsisiyam sa mapagpalang Ina, na ang pamagat Nuestra Senora de la Soledad. (English: Novena to the Blessed Mother, under the title of Our Lady of Solitude), in response to that as reported by the Censor that our Order has examined such, not contain anything against the dogma and morality, but rather deemed highly desirable for the pious reading of the faithful. Recorded for the Secretariat in testimony of this decree and filed the original subject".

— Archbishop Gregory

=== Indulgences ===
- an inscription on an estampa venerated at the chapel of "Tahanan ng Mabuting Pastol", the Diocesan Seminary for Cavite. says that the Spanish Archbishop of Manila, Don Basilio Sancho de Sta. Justa y Rufina granted 80 days indulgence for those who would say the novena in her honor.
- Bishop Mateo Joaquin Rubio de Arevalo of Cebu granted 40 more days for those who did likewise.
- Another Archbishop, Don Juan Antonio de Obrigo y Gallego granted indulgence to her devotees.
- On October 21, 1909, the first American Archbishop of Manila, Jeremiah J. Harty, granted 100 days of Indulgence to those who would make a pious devotion to the Virgin.
- In the 1950s Cesar Ma. Guerrero, former Archbishop of the Diocese of San Fernando (Pampanga) and Tarlac, whose ancestors were full-blooded Cavitenos, permitted the publication of the prayer entitled: "Nuestra Señora de la Soledad de Porta Vaga: CELESTIAL GUARDIANA Y PROTECTORA DE LA PROVINCIADE CAVITE Y SU PUERTO". The bishop likewise granted 300 days indulgence to all who would pray it.

== Regalia ==
=== Silver frame ===
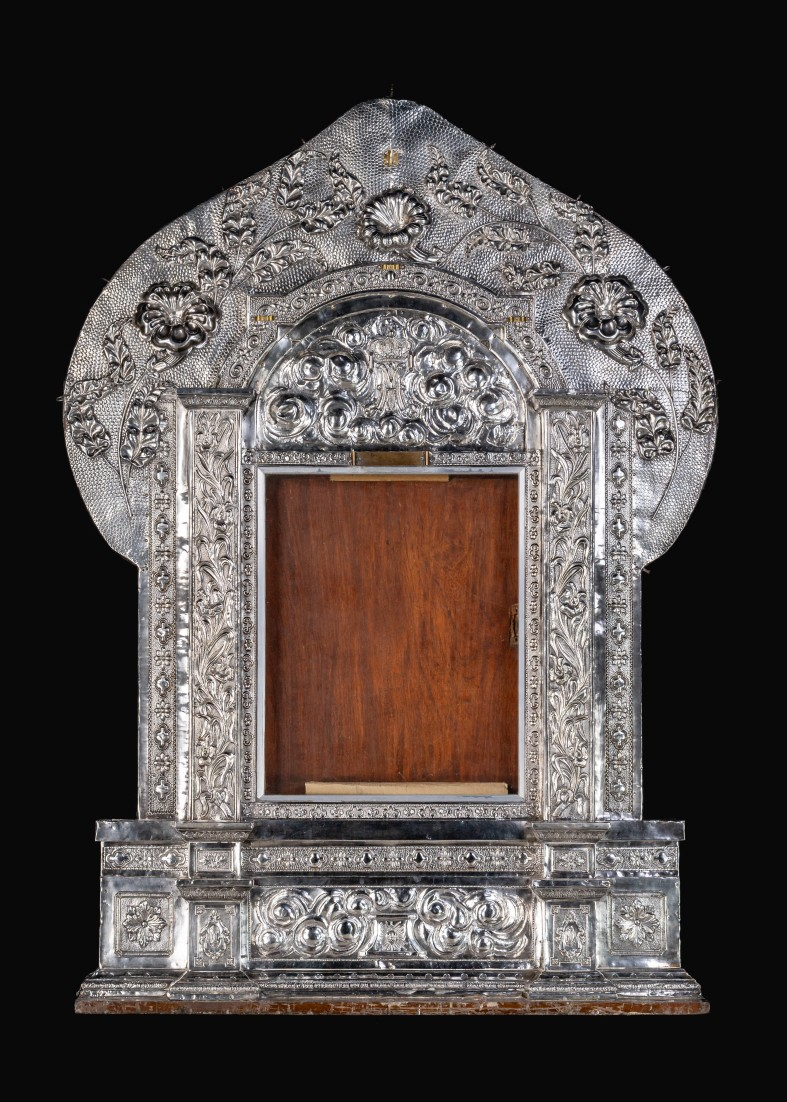
Silver Frame of Our Lady of Solitude of Porta Vaga

The current silver frame used on special occasions such as processions, is made of wood covered in pure silver, with the back made of bronze. The silver came from old coins donated by devotees, and Mexican silver given by Antonio José Sr, owner of a metal trading business. The original frame was destroyed during the Japanese Occupation.

=== Kamagóng frame ===
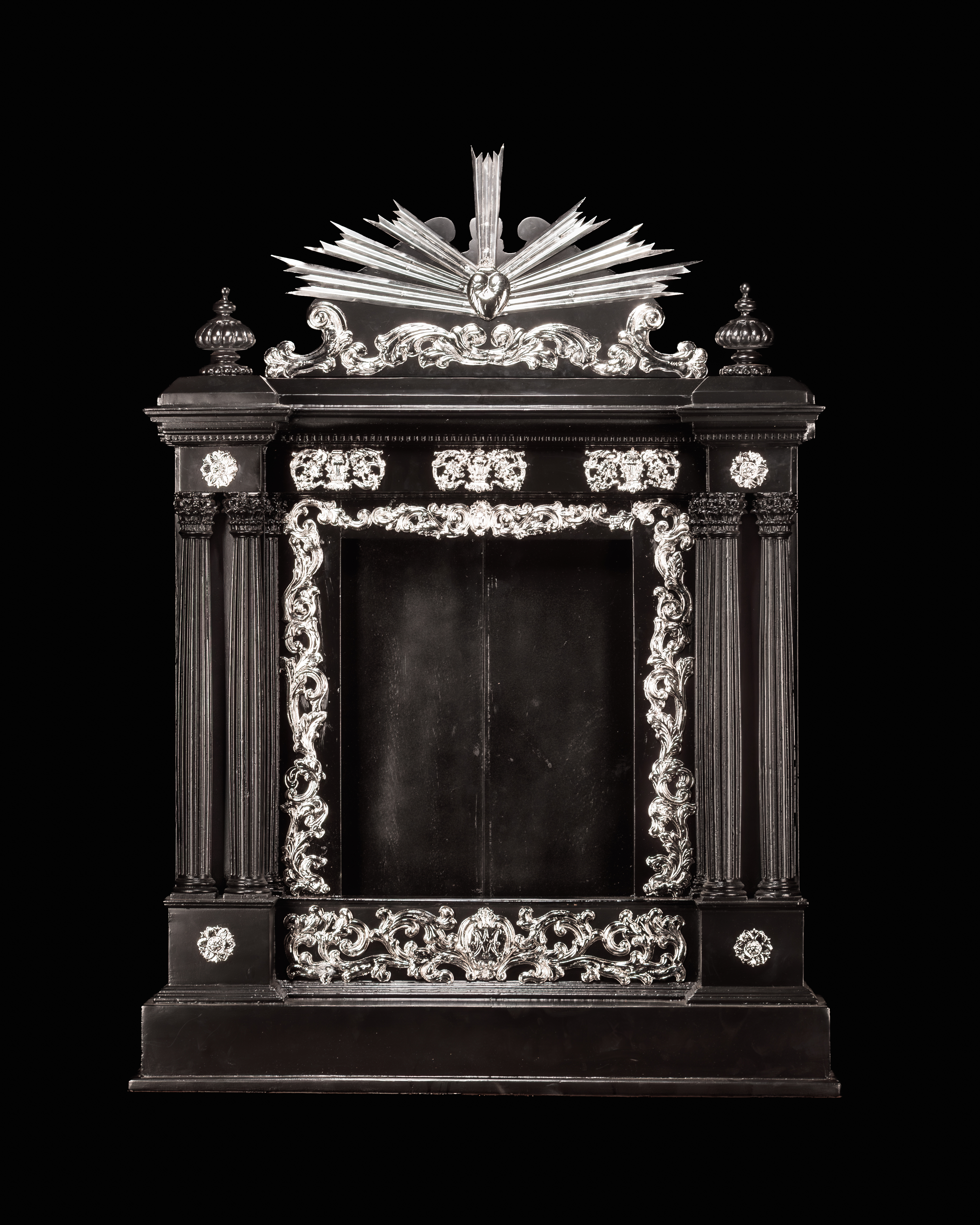
Kamagong Frame of Our Lady of Solitude of Porta Vaga

A wooden frame made of kamagóng (Diospyros discolor) with brass appliqué and silver rays was donated by the Roxas family matriarch. The frame is the icon's throne and used to hold the original image on her altar. Today it holds the "Viajera" or official replica on ordinary days. During the fiesta or on special occasions, it is used for the original icon.

=== Three Cross Crown ===
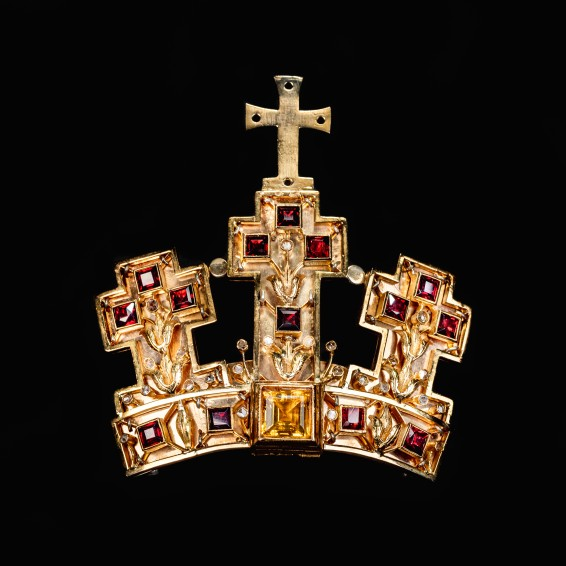
Pectoral cross of Cardinal Rufino Santos, modified into a crown for Our Lady of Solitude of Porta Vaga

A crown made of gold fashioned from the pectoral cross of the former Archbishop of Manila, Cardinal Rufino Santos, was donated as an ex voto during the 17 November 1978 coronation.

=== Auspice Maria Crown (1978) ===
The crown made of pure gold was donated by Don Arturo Mañalac and the auspice maria inlaid with precious gemstones funded from donations of devotees residing abroad. This crown was used for the 17 November 1978 coronation, and is used during the first fiesta on the second week of November.

=== Pontifical Crown (2018) ===
A crown made of gold and precious gems funded by various devotees mostly from its lay confraternity for the 2018 Canonical Coronation. The crown was manufactured by the jeweler "Fedesto" of Fort Bonifacio and YUG Jewelers in Kowloon, Hong Kong.

The Canonical Crowns
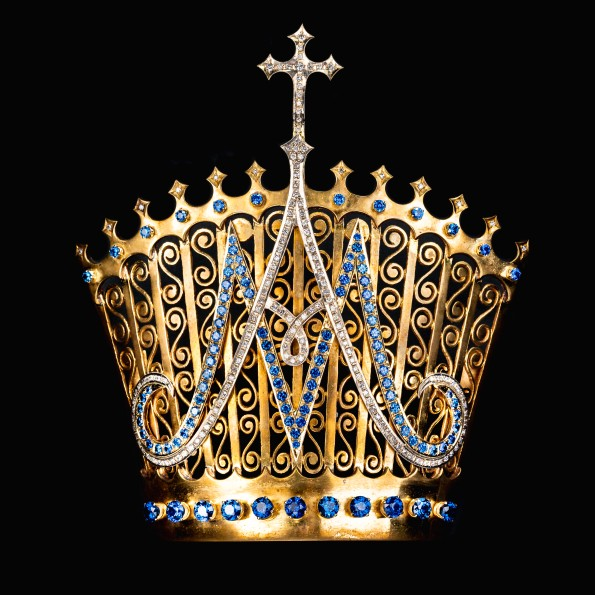
1978 Crown

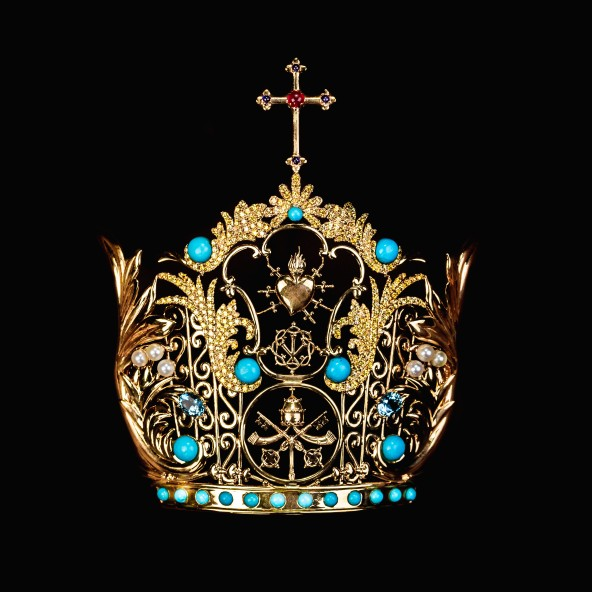
2018 Pontifical Crown

=== Holy Spirit ===
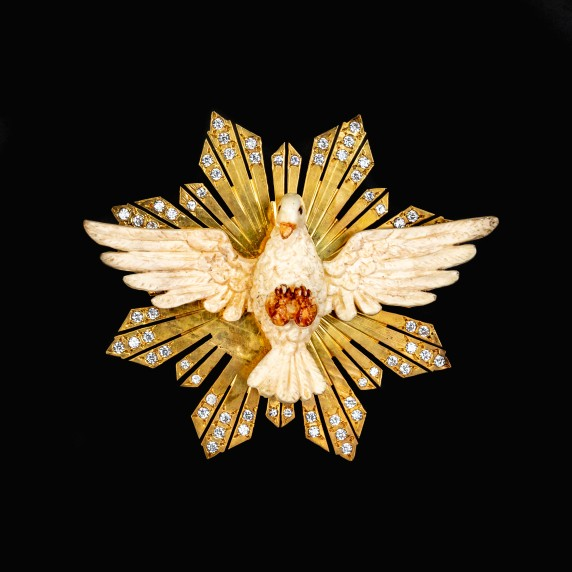
Ivory dove of Our Lady of Solitude of Porta Vaga

The original gold dove went missing in the late 1990s, and a new dove was made from ivory with rays of gold vermeil studded with cubic zirconia. The dove, which symbolizes the Holy Ghost, was given by a devotee for the 2018 Canonical Coronation.

=== Medallion Pins ===
Medallions were made in 2018 to commemorate various civil honours to Our Lady of Solitude of Porta Vaga. The pins were made of silver dipped in gold, and bear the various seals of the state and government institutions.

- National Cultural Treasure Pin — given by the Philippine Government as recognition of the icon as a National Cultural Treasure according to National Museum Resolution No. 2-2017. It depicts the Coat of Arms of the Philippines in an eight-rayed sunburst.
- Patroness of the Province Pin — honours the image as a unique treasure and Patroness of the whole province of Cavite, depicting the provincial seal in a sunburst with plant motifs.
- Patroness of the City Pin — given by the Cavite City government through the city Resolution No. 2017-071, recognizing the image as the city's treasure and Patroness. It takes the form of the city seal ringed by laurel wreaths, and a four-rayed sunburst with three, five-petalled flowers in between.
The Medallion Pins
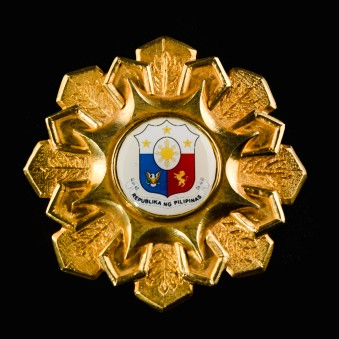
National Cultural Treasure Pin

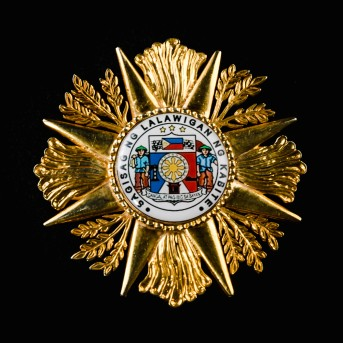
Patron of the Province Pin

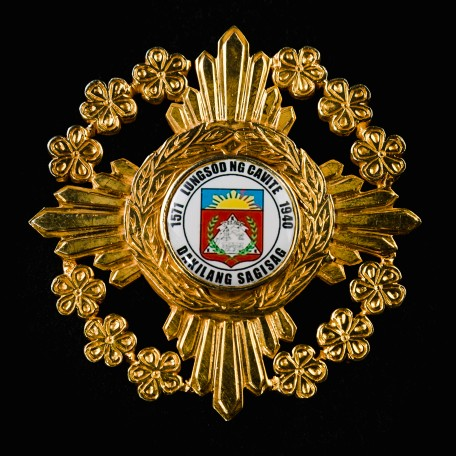
Patron of the City Pin

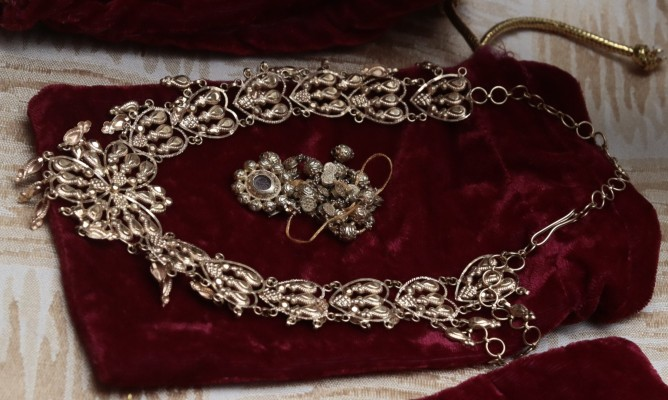
Gold Choker filigree Necklace and the Tambourine Necklace at the center

Various Ex Votos of the image, most notably:

- Gold Choker filigree Necklace was given by the Valdez family patriarch
- Gold Tambourine Necklace
- Gold puzzle ring

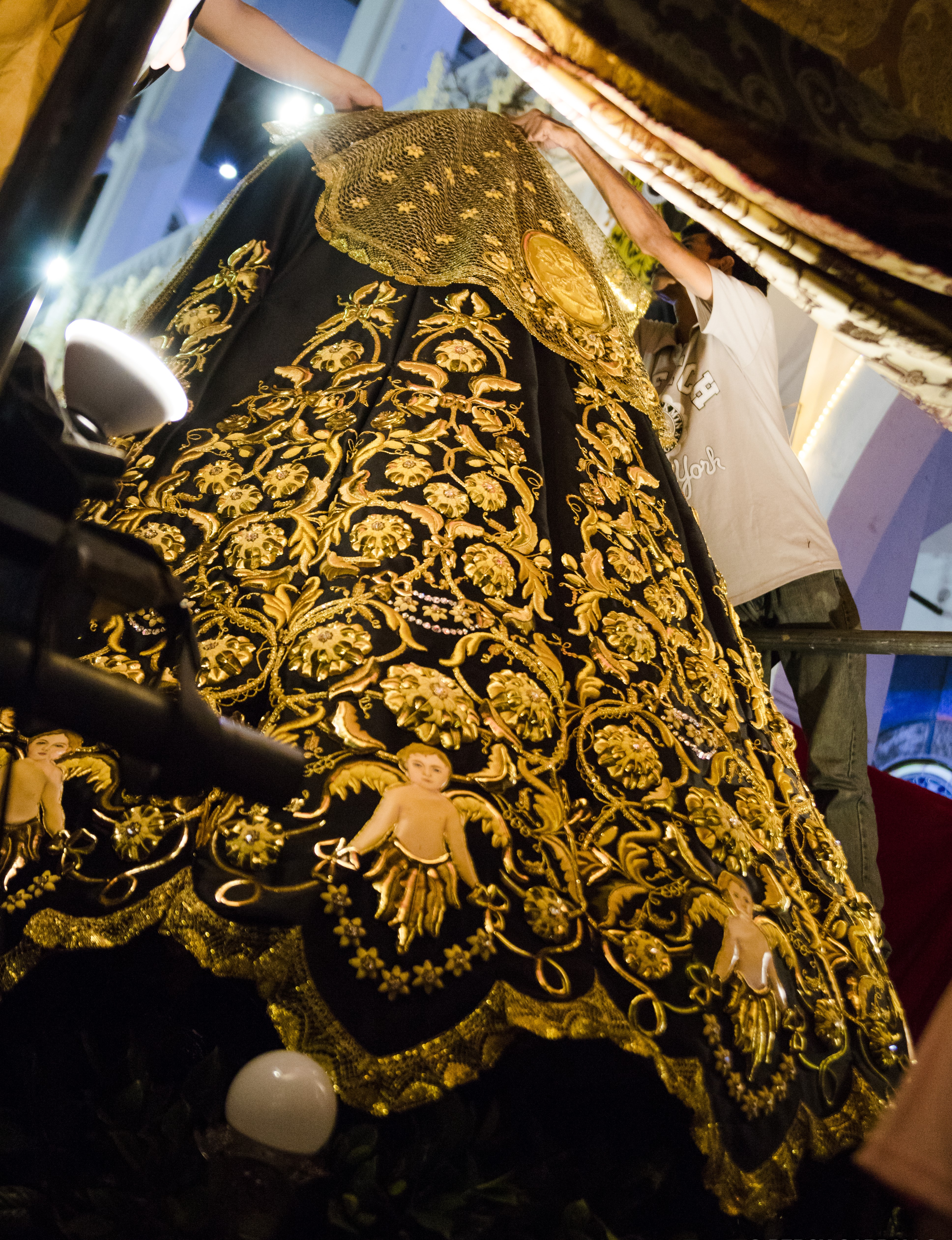
Goldwork Cape or Mantle used on the 2018 Canonical Coronation

- During processions and events, devotees would adorn the frame of the image with a large cape or mantle. for a tradition states that the cape should be divide into 7 panels symbolizing the 7 sorrows of Mary. A small veil is often placed on top of the cape so it resembles a woman from behind.
- Every time the image is carried without the frame on processions and during the "Pahalik" tradition a simple veil usually black is placed on top of the image itself. The veils are brought by devotees and returned to them afterwards as mementos.
- On Good Friday, a translucent black veil covers the image of Our Lady of Solitude symbolizing the state of mourning.

== Hymns ==
- In 1892, Philippine composer Julian Felipe created the hymn "Reina de Cavite". The lyrics were taken from the poem Himno a la Virgén de Cavite (Hymn to the Virgin of Cavite) by Fr. Tomás de Andrade, S.J., the rector of the Jesuit College of Cavite sometime in 1689.

Lyrics
Original Poem By Fr. Tomás de Andrade, S.J. Himno a la Virgén de Cavite (Spanish)	Lyrics used by Julian Felipe Reina de Cavite (Kastila)	Lyrics translated by Herminia Victoriano Reyna ng Kabite (Tagalog)
Reina de Cavite; Por siempre seras; Es prenda tu nombre De jubilo y paz. La nacion entera Con culto filial Tus glorias pregona Tu imagen venera Y en tu honor entona Un himno triumphal. Consuelo del justo Luz del picador Nuestras penas calma Y en tu trono agusto De piadosas almas Oyes el clamor. Como la heroina Gozo de Israel, Eres nuestra Gloria; Princesa Divina; Que das la victoria A tu pueblo fiel. Madre immaculada Prez del Serafin; Luz de Filipinas; O virgin Sagrada; Haz que alla en el cielo Te honreinos sin fin.	Reina de Cavite per siempre seras: Es prenda tu nombre de jubilo y paz: Reina de Cavite por siempre seras; Es prenda tu nombre de jubilo y paz. Madre Immaculada, prez del serafin, Luz de Filipinas, protegenos sin fin: Madre Immaculada, prez del serafin, Luz de Filipinas, protegenos sin fin. Luz de Filipinas, protegenos sin fin!	Reyna ng Kabite; Laging tawag ng lahat Kapayapaan at galak Ngalan mo'y siyang pugad. Reyna ng Kabite; Laging tawag ng lahat Kapayapaan at galak Sa iyo'y nagbubuhat Inang kalinis-linisan Mahal ng Serafin; Ilaw ka ng Pilipinas; Tunay kang tanglaw namin! Inang kalinis-linisan Mahal ng Serafin; Ilaw ka ng Pilipinas; Tunay kang tanglaw namin! Ilaw ka ng Pilipinas; Ika'y tanglaw namin!

In 1991, in preparation for the celebration of the Tricentennial of the Enthronement of Our Lady of Port Vaga, the National Artist Lucio San Pedro made a four-voice arrangement of the hymn

- In 1945, Reverend Pedro Larena wrote a poem entitled "O Purísima Flor".
- "Dulce Madre" The longest and one of the oldest song in honor of Our lady of Porta Vaga. not much is known about when and who composed the song.
- In celebration of the 350th year of the arrival of the original icon of Our lady of Porta Vaga in Cavite, By the Request of Fr, Virgilio Saenz Mendoza, fr. Francisco, SJ, a famous composer, together with Fr. Randy de Jesus who wrote the lyrics "Ina at Reyna". the hymn was used at the 2018 Canonical Coronation
- For the Declaration of the Original Icon of Or Lady of Porta Vaga as a National Cultural Treasure of the Philippines, Seminarian Genesis Frances M. Toledo, DS, composed the song, "Preciosa y Poderosa" with the lyrics written by Marco Federico Dalma, a Devotee from Las Piñas

== In popular culture ==
- Filipino writer Genoveva Edroza Matute — claims that the grandiose celebration of the fiesta of San Diego in Jose Rizal's Noli Me Tangere was actually based on the grandiose fiesta celebration of Cavite.
- Milagro sa Porta Vaga (lit. 'The Miracle at Porta Vaga') — a 1982 religious film starring Julie Vega and Leopoldo Salcedo. The film has since been considered lost.
- The Bayanihan Dance Company — once depicted the fiesta celebration of the Virgin in songs and creative dances entitles "Porta Vaga Suite" which was presented at the Cultural Center of the Philippines in 1994. Old Caviteño dances and Chabacano folk songs were collected and used in the said presentation of Cavite Fiesta de Antigos
- The Teatro Baile de Cavite — under the direction of Breshnev Larlar presented a musical play in honor of Our Lady of Port Vaga. Many songs used in the play was composed by Gary Granada.

== List of religious organizations ==
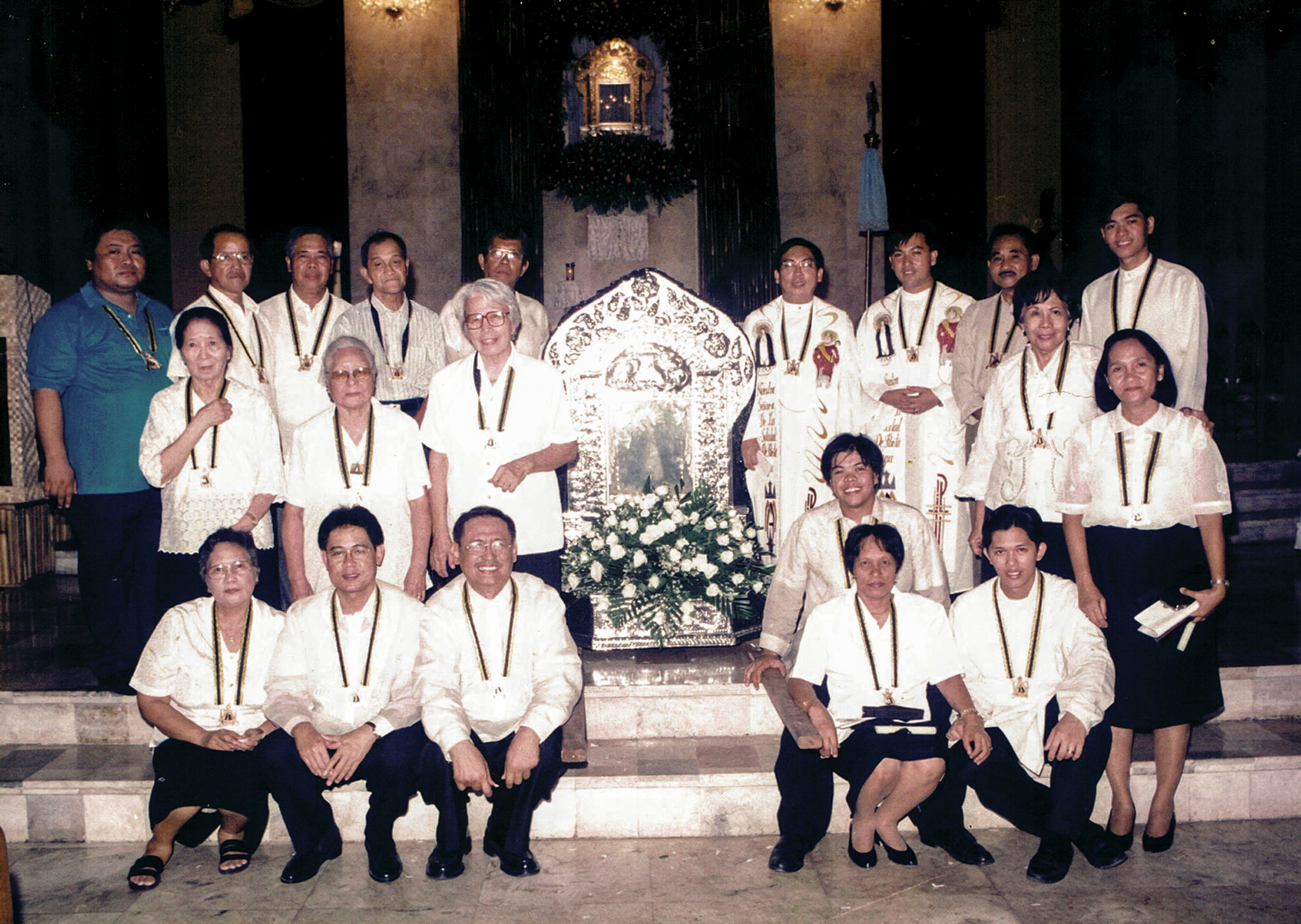
The founding members of the Confraternity of the Virgin of Solitude of Porta Vaga

- Cofradia de la Virgen de la Soledad de Porta Vaga. — On 10 August 1998, the Bishop of Imus, Manuel C. Sobrevinias founded this group. The group was officially inaugurated on 17 November 1998 on the 20th Anniversary of the image's coronation by former Apostolic Nuncio, Bruno Torpigliani.
- Venerable Hermanidad de la Nuestra Señora de la Soledad. — a group of devotees from sulipan, Apalit, Pampanga Founded on the year 1794, According to historical documents the Hermanidad was founded by Captain don Bernabe Pablo de Santa Cruz [de la Cruz] a Macapagal – of the old Sucad family. He was a descendant of Taoi and Pampalong, founders of Sucad in the 1570s and daughters of Rajah Matanda of Tondo.
- Daughters of Our Lady of Solitude of Porta Vaga in Cavite — The organization founded on 15 September 1979 on the rectorship of Avenido Sapida once called Daughters of Mary Immaculate (DMI).
- "Soleda" group — organization of devotees of the image from Cautod, Sta Margarita, Calbayog Samar organizing the yearly "Soleda" festival.

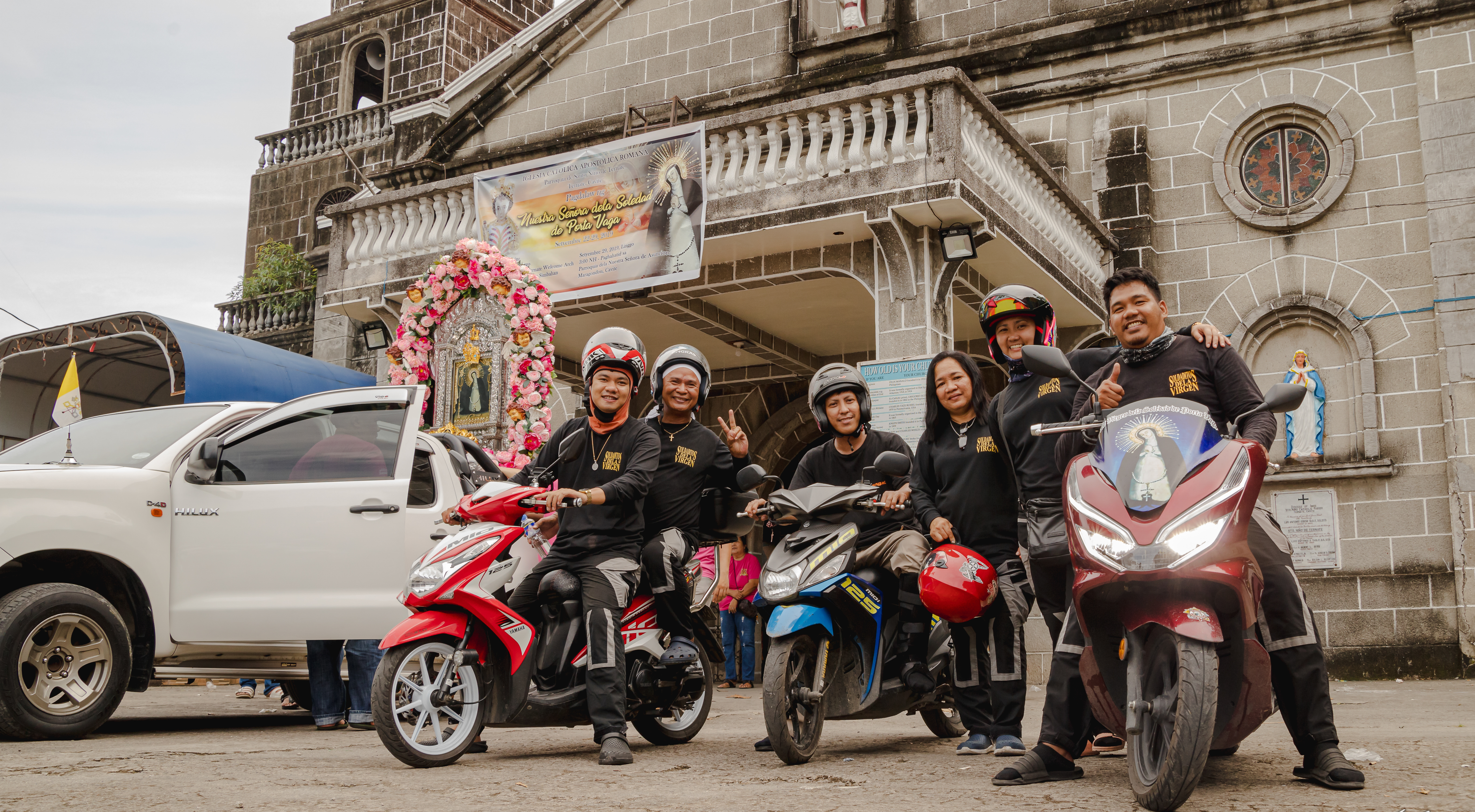
The Soldaditos de la Virgen during the cavite leg of the 2019 dalaw soledad

- The "Soldaditos" — is a motorcycle group that sprung up from a group devotees mostly from around manila that volunteers to accompany and leads the way of the caravan of the yearly dalaw Soledad and also acts as bearer and human barricades when the image arrive at its destination.
- Hermanidad de la Virgen de la Soledad de Porta Vaga (Mendez, Cavite) — is a devotion to Virgen de la Soledad started when a Philippine Navy officer in Cavite city transferred residence in Mendez, Cavite in the 1970s.
- The "Jovenes de la Soledad" Youth Prayer Group — is a formal group was formed to promote the devotion to the image.

== Regional Devotional Variants ==
=== Parochial Devotion ===
Official Title	Image	Current Location	Period	Status	Feast Day	Description	Ref
Nuestra Señora de la Soledad de Tambo		Archdiocesan Shrine and Parish of Our Lady of Solitude, Tambo, Buhi, Camarines Sur	1775	Episcopaly Crowned (8 December 2023)	3 February	This is one of the three carvings on the calpe tree on the Story of Our Lady of Salvacion. One was of San Antonio de Padua, three statuettes-Nuestra Señora de Salvacion, San Antonio de Padua, and Nuestra Señora de Soledad—now in Joroan of Tiwi, and Tambo, Buhi, respectively.	
Nuestra Señora de la Soledad de Sulipan	Altar image	Christ the Eternal High Priest Parish, Sulipan, Apalit, Pampanga	1794	Original image missing	16 November	This image of Our Lady of Solitude is based on the old Estampa of our lady of solitude of Porta Vaga and is venerated as the Patron of Sulipan, Apalit, Pampanga and is under the care of the Venerable Hermanidad de Nuestra Señora de la Soledad the oldest existing group of Devotees of Our Lady of Solitude that was founded on the year 1794.	
Nuestra Señora de la Soledad de Nueva Ecija		Saint Isidore the Farmer Parish, San Isidro, Nueva Ecija			2nd Sunday of November	Another copy of the image is venerated in Nueva Ecija. The icon has occupied a niche above a side altar of the town church and that it was honored in a fluvial procession on the Rio Grande de Pampanga. This tradition was held from the mid-19th century till the 1920s. In 1982, the image mysteriously vanished. It was thought to have been stolen but no police records exist to support this. Sometime after its disappearance, the image found its way to an antique dealer in Manila and was purchased by a private individual. After twenty years, was returned and venerated in San Isidro Labrador church.	
Nuestra Señora de la Soledad de Manila		Nuestra Señora de la Soledad Parish, Camba, Manila	1884	Episcopaly Crowned (8 July 2017)	1 January	Venerated in a little chapel in Recto Avenue of Manila is another version of image which tradition claiming a similar devotion since 1884. According to account, the Camba area has been inhabited by mostly residents from Cavite city that is why it has been called in the older days as Barrio Soledad. Her feastday is celebrated annually every 1 January through a translation going to the parish of Santo Niño de Tondo capped by a festive procession going back to its home in Camba Street, Manila.	
Nuestra Señora de la Soledad de Maquinaya		Immaculate Conception Parish, Barretto, Olongapo	1950's	Episcopaly Crowned (22 August 2021)	2nd Saturday and Sunday of November	An inherited devotion from migrant workers of Sangley Point, Cavite City who transferred to Subic Naval Base and have decided to reside in Maquinaya considering the same geographical set-up of their hometown. In March 1959, the Catholic Women's Association in Barrio Maquinaya was formed under the auspices of Saint Joseph Parish and its devotees later decided to choose a religious patron by means of draw lots. Five patronal choices were given: Senor Nazareno, Santo Nino, Virgen Soledad, Mother of Perpetual Help and Saint Jude Thaddeus. A child was chosen to cast the draw and resulted in the "Virgen Soledad", and so declared to be the patroness of the Barrio and have chosen the 2nd Sunday of November to celebrate the annual festivities. In 1961, Reverend Henry Byrne, former Bishop of Iba, Zambales donated ₽10,000.00 PHP to build a community church in Barrio Barretto. However, in 1986, the erected parish in Barrio Barretto was established under the patronage of the Immaculate Conception. Believers still celebrates the November festivity with fervent devotion.	
Nuestra Señora de la Soledad de Cañacao		Our Lady of Solitude Parish, Villa Cañacao, Kawit, Cavite	1993		15 November	This image, venerated as the Patroness of the Parish of Nuestra Señora de la Soledad in Villa Canacao, Sta. Isabel, Kawit, Cavite, was brought by the landowner where the parish now stands in 1993, the late Tony G. Nazareno. Due to his devotion to La Virgen de la Soledad de Porta Vaga, he advocated for the parish to be placed under the patronage of the Blessed Virgin of Soledad. The parish celebrates its feast day every 15 September.	
Nuestra Señora de la Soledad de Navotas		Holy Cross Parish, Tanza, Navotas	2021		1st Sunday of November	An image of Our Lady of Solitude was commissioned by the "Jovenes de la Soledad" Youth Prayer Group of Tanza, Navotas made by a local artist in Cavite City and enthroned at the side altar of the parish.	

=== Images with dedicated chapels ===
Official Title	Image	Current Location	Period	Feast Day	Description	Ref
Nuestra Señora de la Soledad		Tahanan ng Mabuting Pastol Diocesan Seminary, Tagaytay City, Cavite	1700's	3rd Sunday of November	A replica copy of the image is venerated at the chapel of "Tahanan ng Mabuting Pastol", the Diocesan Seminary for Cavite. This image was formerly hung at the Jesuit College of Cavite. After the expulsion of the Jesuits in 1768, the image was kept in the Jesuit archives of Ateneo. The image was given to Bishop Perez as a gift on the occasion of the inauguration of the new seminary. On this replica image, an inscription says that the Spanish Archbishop of Manila, Don Basilio Sancho de Santa Justa y Rufina granted 80 days plenary indulgence for those who would say the novena. Bishop Mateo Rubio de Arevalo of Cebu granted 40 more days along with Archbishop Don Juan Antonio de Obrigo y Gallego granted indulgence just the same.	
Nuestra Señora de la Soledad de Porta Vaga de Magallanes		Nuestra Señora de la Soledad de Porta Vaga Chapel, Brgy. Kabulusan, Magallanes, Cavite		2nd Sunday of November	Not much is known about this image, painted on wood and faded over the years, but the devotion remains strong in Magallanes.	
Nuestra Señora de la Soledad de Sta Margarita and Matobato	Images from Sta Margarita, Image from Matobato	Nuestra Señora de la Soledad Chapel, Sta. Margarita, and Saint Raphael Chapel, Matobato, Calbayog, Samar	1900s	2nd Sunday of November	In the early 1900s, Caviteño migrants brought the devotion to Nuestra Señora de la Soledad to Samar, particularly in Calbayog and Sta. Margarita. In 1934, Juana Olaes de Santiago introduced the image in Cautod, using a silk image made in 1919. The devotion was continued by locals and a chapel was built in the 1960s. Another center of devotion formed in Matobato, also established by Caviteños. A local tradition tells of two separate fluvial processions—from Cautod and Matobato—that met at sea after weather prevented one group from joining the other.	

=== Extra-Parochial Patronal Image ===
Official Title	Image	Current Location	Period	Feast Day	Description	Ref
Nuestra Señora de la Soledad de Mauban		Barangay Soledad, Mauban, Quezon	1600s	11 October	Found in Barangay Soledad, Mauban, Quezon, which is recognized as the town of Mauban's Second Patroness.	

=== Venerated image under familial custodianship ===
Official Title	Image	Current Location	Period	Custodian	Description	Ref
Nuestra Señora de la Soledad de Malabon		St. Francis of Assisi Parish Church, Malabon, General Trias, Cavite	1800s	Deseo Family	The image of Nuestra Señora de la Soledad de Malabon in General Trias, Cavite is a century-old “estampa” or printed image of La Virgen de la Soledad de Porta Vaga, which was painted over and adorned with golden accessories. It was placed in a reliquary made of silver in the Rococo style. According to historical accounts, the earliest recorded owner of the image was Andres Trias Deseo, an organist and composer, and a member of the old band formerly known as the San Francisco de Malabon Band, renowned for being the first to perform the Philippine national anthem. It is said that Andres Trias Deseo inherited the image from his relatives in Cavite Puerto—now known as Cavite City—and brought it to Malabon, General Trias. It was used to welcome visitors and was displayed in front of their house. The pedestal is a later addition to the image.	
Nuestra Señora de la Soledad de Pangasinan		Capela de Ntra Sra dela Soledad Chapel, San Carlos, Pangasinan	1800s	Torres–Bandong–Acosta family	The devotion to Nuestra Señora de la Soledad in San Carlos, Pangasinan began in the late 1800s when Jose Torres, a sailor from the Acosta family, found a silk cloth bearing the image of the Virgin floating in the sea before his ship sailed for Acapulco. Believing it to be lost or discarded, he brought the image home to Pangasinan. The ship survived a deadly storm that sank other vessels, which was attributed to the Virgin's miraculous protection. Over the years, the image was passed down through the Bandong and Acosta families, where it became the center of growing devotion. Numerous miraculous events have been associated with the image, including healings, protection from harm, and divine guidance in emergencies. One notable story recounts a woman's healing through a candle stub and oil used during her vigil before the image. Despite limited resources, a chapel was built after World War II and later replaced by a permanent concrete shrine in time for the centennial celebration. Today, the image remains under the care of the Torres–Bandong–Acosta family, who have ensured that the devotion endures.	

=== Devotional images from other traditions ===
Official Title	Image	Current Location	Period	Denomination	Description	Ref
Nuestra Señora de la Soledad de Porta Vaga de Caridad		Iglesia Filipina Independiente - Church of Our Lady of Charity, Caridad, Cavite City	1900s	Philippine Independent Church	This bas-relief shadow box image of Our Lady of Solitude became the archetype for the images of the Aglipayans in and around Cavite.	

== See also ==
- Mariology
- María de la Soledad
- List of canonically crowned images
- Cavite City
