= San Roque Church (Cavite City) =

Roman Catholic church in Cavite, Philippines

- Parish and Diocesan Shrine of Our Lady of Solitude of Porta Vaga
- Santuario Diocesano é Iglesia Parroquial de Nuestra Señora de la Soledad de Porta Vaga (Spanish); Pangdiyosesanong Dambana ng Mahal na Birhen ng Soledad ng Porta Vaga (Tagalog)
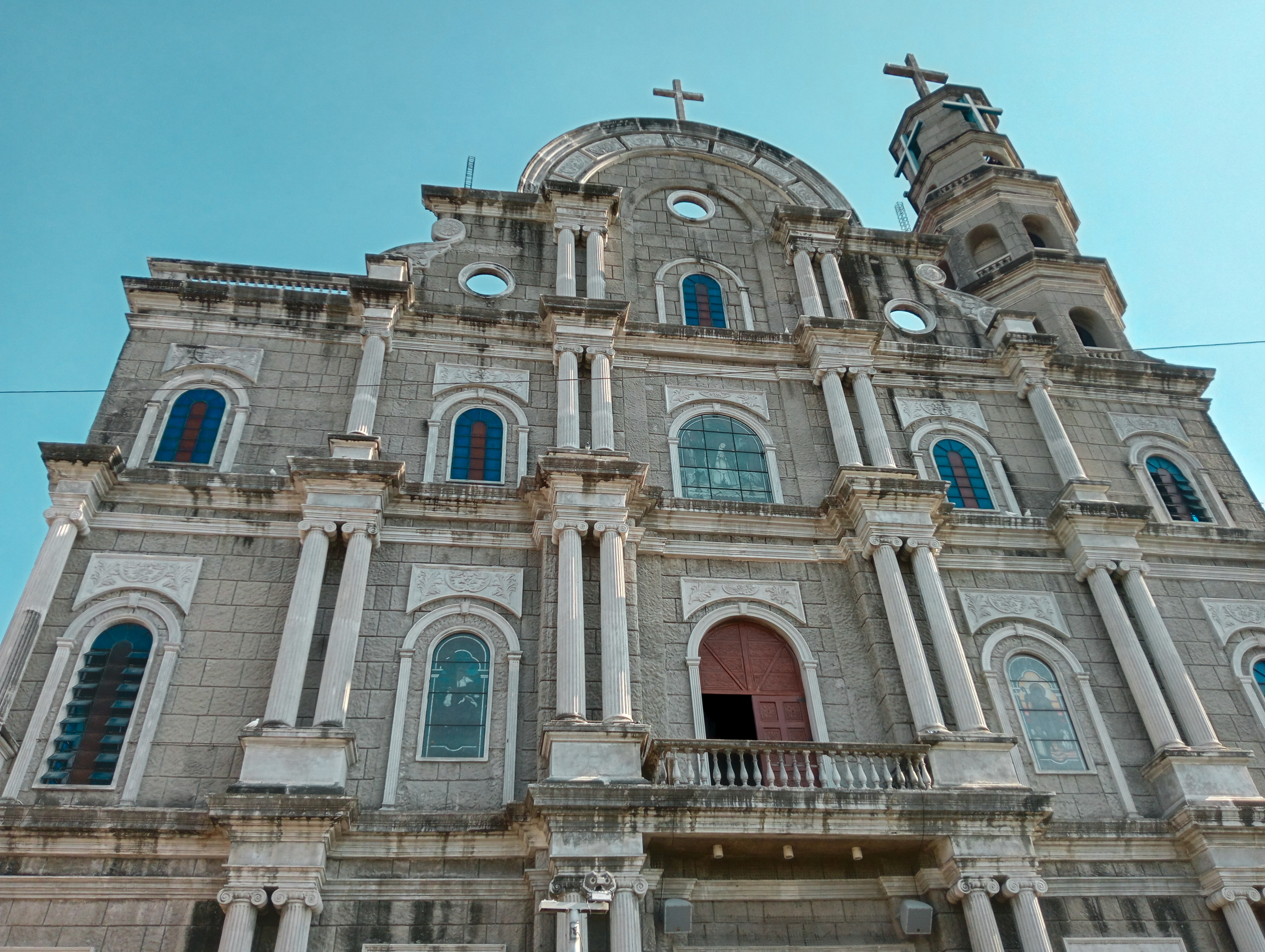
- Church façade in 2024

- Location in Luzon Location in the Philippines
- 14°28′49″N 120°54′04″E
- Location: Cavite
- Country: Philippines
- Denomination: Roman Catholic

History
- Status: Parish
- Founded: 1586
- Founder
- Dedication: Saint Roch

Architecture
- Functional status: Active
- Architectural type: Church building

Administration
- Province: Cavite
- Archdiocese: Manila
- Diocese: Imus
- Parish: Saint Roch

Clergy
- Rector: Rev. Fr. Michael Reuben R. Cron
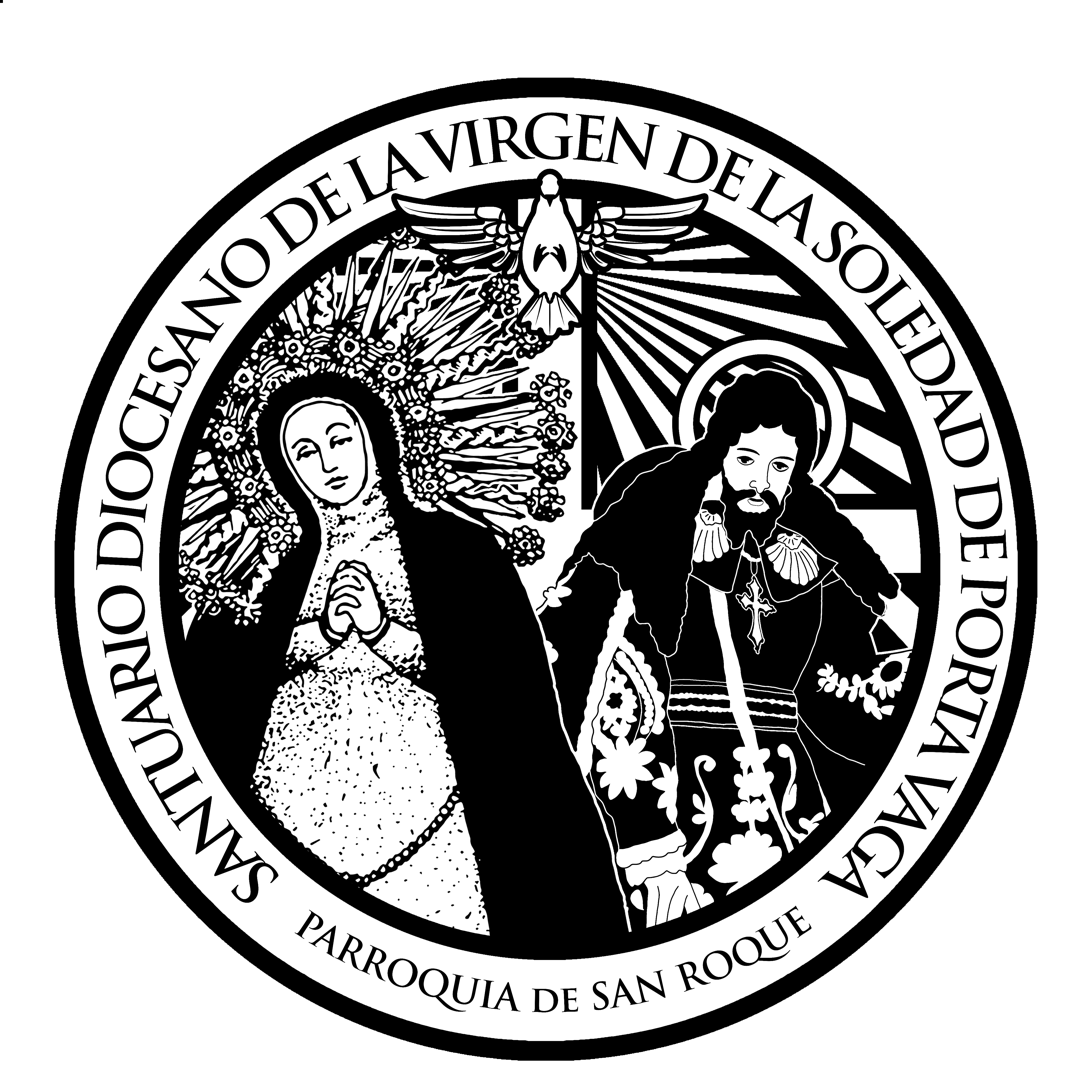

The Diocesan Shrine of Our Lady of Solitude of Porta Vaga, commonly known as San Roque Parish Church, is a Latin Rite Roman Catholic church in Cavite City on Luzon island, the Philippines. It is under the jurisdiction of the Diocese of Imus. The church enshrines Our Lady of Solitude of Porta Vaga, an icon that appeared after an apparition of the Blessed Virgin Mary.

== History ==
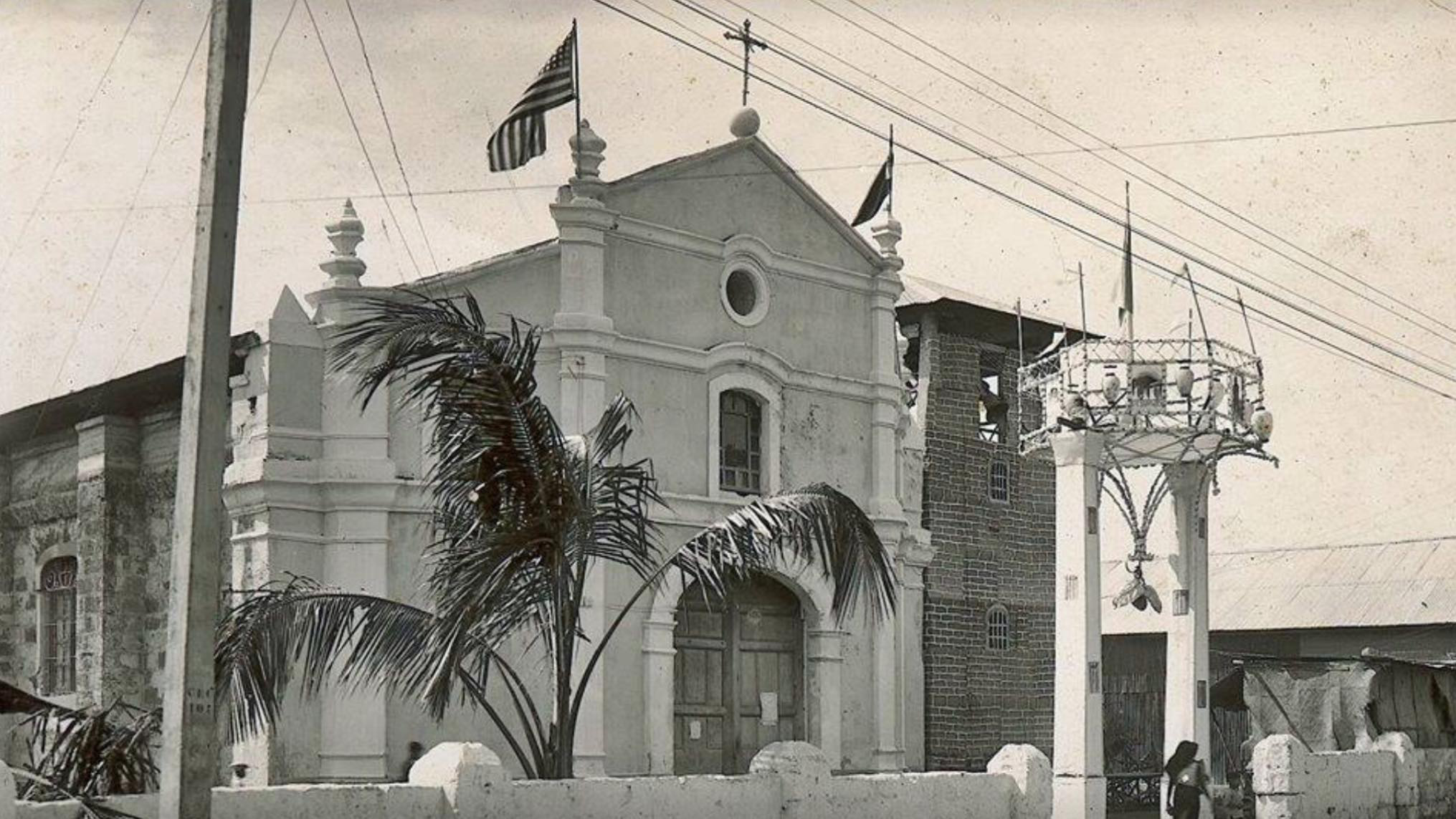
San Roque Church in 1930

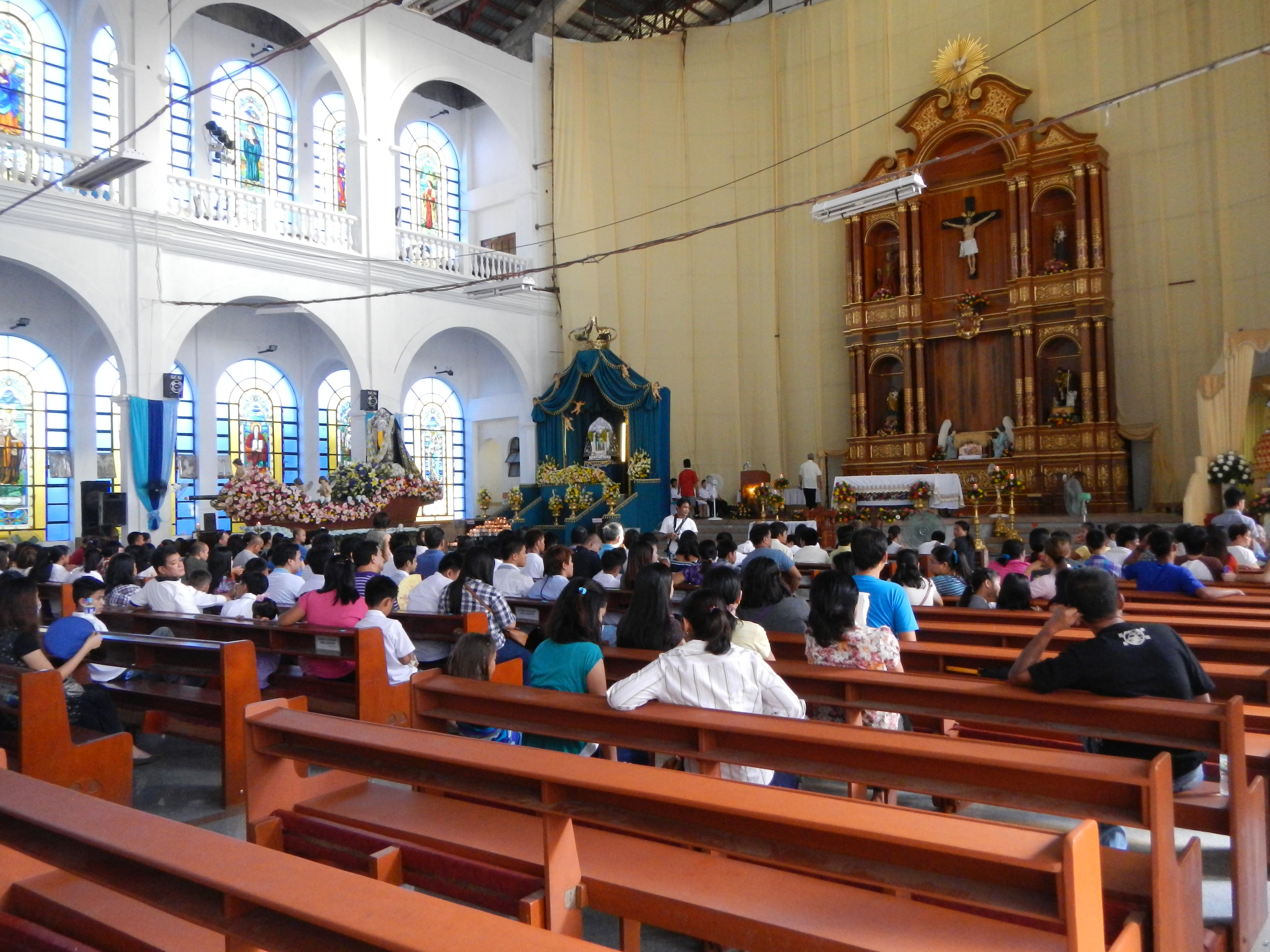
Church interior in 2013

Sitting at the southern part of the colonial walled city of Cavite, conquering Spaniards in 1571 found the place a forested swamp. Its location was very strategic for trade as it was surrounded by water, a likely reason why many Chinese frequented the place. In 1573, when the invading Chinese pirate Limahong was repulsed by the Spaniards, he retreated to the northern part of San Roque, today the Philippine military base of Sangley Point. In 1614, the province of Cavite was placed under a politico-military government, and San Roque was made an independent pueblo.

Sometime in 1700, a badly damaged ship stopped for repairs at a certain place in Cavite called Sapa-sapaan. Aboard the ship was an image of Saint Roch which the crew venerated as their patron, as the custom was to have saints on board a ship during a voyage to serve as protectors. Before work began, the ship’s captain ordered that the image of Saint Roch be placed in the nipa hut that served as the town’s chapel, dedicated to Saint Margaret. After the ship had been repaired, the captain asked the workers to re-enshrine the image on the ship, but the crew could not move the statue. They told the captain of this, and they decided to leave the image in the chapel. The story spread around and since then, Saint Roch was made patron and namesake of the town.

The 1818 Spanish census showed the area had 3,906 native families and 443 Spanish-Filipino families.

== List of Parish priests ==
Year	Priest
1774-?	Fr. Vicente Monleon y Peralta [Parish Priest] Fr. Joseph Mendoza and Fr. Vanta [Assts.]
1808 - 1812	Fr. Andres Juan del Rosario [Parish Priest] Fr. Dioniso Ramos, Fr. Alejandro Urana, Fr. Francisco Miranda [Assts.]
1826-?	Fr. Eulalio Ramirez [Parish Priest] Fr. Mariano de San Agustin [ Asst.]
1827 -1832	Fr. Lazaro Salustiano [ Parish Priest] Fr. Mariano de San Agustin, Fr. Baltazar de los Reyes Fr. Ciriaco Roque, Fr. Remigio Baltazar [ Assts.]
1850- ?	Fr. Mamerto Mariano [ Parish Priest ] Fr. Florentino Tiongco, Fr. Remigio Cornelio [Assts]
1860 -1866	Fr. Gavino de los Reyes [ Parish Priest ] Fr. Juan Buenaventura [ Parish Priest ] Fr. Atancio Marchan [ Capellan de Arsenal ]
1886 - 1894	Fr. Antino Gonzales [Parish Priest] Fr. Celedonio Mateo, Fr. Cecilio Damian Fr. Vicente Ramirez [ Assts]
1900	Fr. Gines Ribes S.J
1905	Fr. Federico Evangelista
1907	Fr. Blas Reyes
1910	Fr. Godoredo Aledenhuijo
1912	Fr. Paul Huwabe
1915	Fr. Manuel Gatmaytan
1920	Fr. Simplicio Fernandez
1925	Fr. Ruberto de Blas [ Recoletos ]
1935 - 1972	Msgr. Pedro Lerena, D.P [ Parish Priest ] [Recoletos] Fr. Conrado Gosioco [ Asst] Fr. Artemio Casas, Fr. Greg Ma. Villaseran [Ministers] Fr. German Chicota, Fr. Paulino Lerena [Interim]
1972-1988	Msgr. Baraquiel Mojica, D.P [ Parish Priest ]
1988 - 1999	Msgr. Hernando Godoy, D.P [ Parish Priest ]
1999 - 2009	Rev. Fr. Avelino Sapida [ Parish Priest ]
2009 - 2013	Rev. Fr. Cezar R. Reyes Jr. [ Parish Priest ] Rev. Fr. Orlando A. Jimenez [ Asst. Priest ] Rev. Fr. Jerry Belen [ Asst. Priest ]
2013–2021	Rev. Fr. Dominador B. Medina [ Parish Priest ] Rev. Fr. Dionisio Vargas Palingping [ Asst. Priest ] Rev. Fr. Geoffrey G. Zacarias [ Asst. Priest ]
2021 - Present	Fr. Michael Cron [ Parish Priest ]
