= Balesin =

Balesin can refer to the following places:

- Balesin, Meyaneh, village in Iran
- Balesin-e Sharifabad, village in Iran
- Balesin Island (also just Balesin), island barangay in the Philippines
- Balesin Airport, airport serving the Island of Balesin, Philippines
