= Cavite Peninsula =

Peninsula in Manila Bay in the Philippines

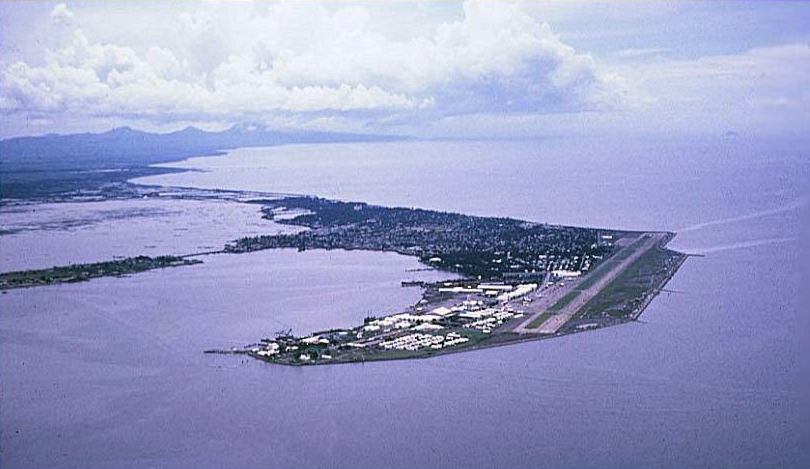
Aerial view (c. 1964) of the Cavite Peninsula as seen from the north with Manila Bay below and right of the picture. In the foreground is the former U.S. Naval Base Sangley Point, with Cavite City adjacent in the back. Cañacao Bay is immediately to the left of the naval base. Bacoor Bay is on the left center of the picture.

The Cavite Peninsula is a peninsula extending northeast into Manila Bay from the coastal town of Noveleta in Cavite province in the Philippines. The northern tip of the peninsula is geographically the northernmost part of the province of Cavite.

The peninsula is composed of 5 districts and the City of Cavite with a tiny southern portion part of the Municipality of Noveleta. The northernmost portion of the peninsula, called Sangley Point, was the location of the former U.S. Naval Station Sangley Point until 1971 when it was turned over to the Philippine government. It is now called the Danilo Atienza Air Base, a Philippine Air Force base.

== Geography ==
=== Districts ===
Cavite City is divided into five districts: San Antonio on the north, Caridad at the center, San Roque at the east, Sta. Cruz on the southwest and Dalahican on the south towards the Municipality of Noveleta.

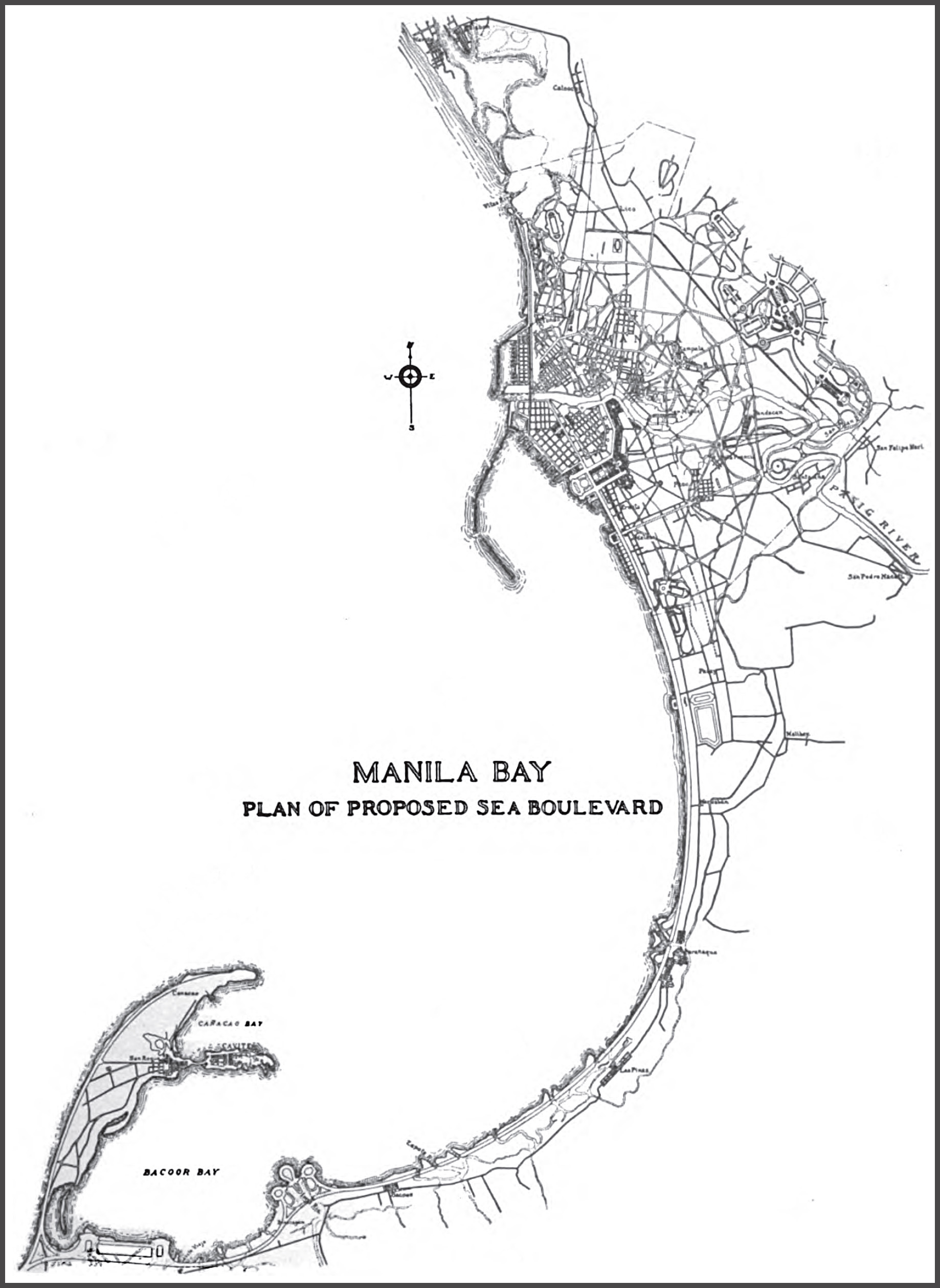
The Cavite peninsula (lower left) in relation to the City of Manila (upper middle).

The peninsula is shaped like a human left hand starting from about the middle of the forearm with fingers forming a letter 'C'. Cañacao Bay is the body of water formed by the C-shaped upper peninsula. The thumb area was the historic old Port City of Cavite, the sister city and main seaport of the City of Manila. Because of deeper waters than the Port of Manila that was then located along the banks of the Pasig River, the Port of Cavite became the staging and receiving area for the Manila galleon trade from 1565 to 1815.

The port city used to be an island connected by a causeway to Barangay San Roque as seen from the picture above and the map to the left. The land along the causeway was reclaimed in the late 1960s, and is now occupied by the San Sebastian College-Recoletos de Cavite. The tip of the thumb, known as the Cavite Punta or Cavite Point, was the location of the old Spanish shipyard where galleons were built. It later became Cavite Navy Yard during the American colonial rule.

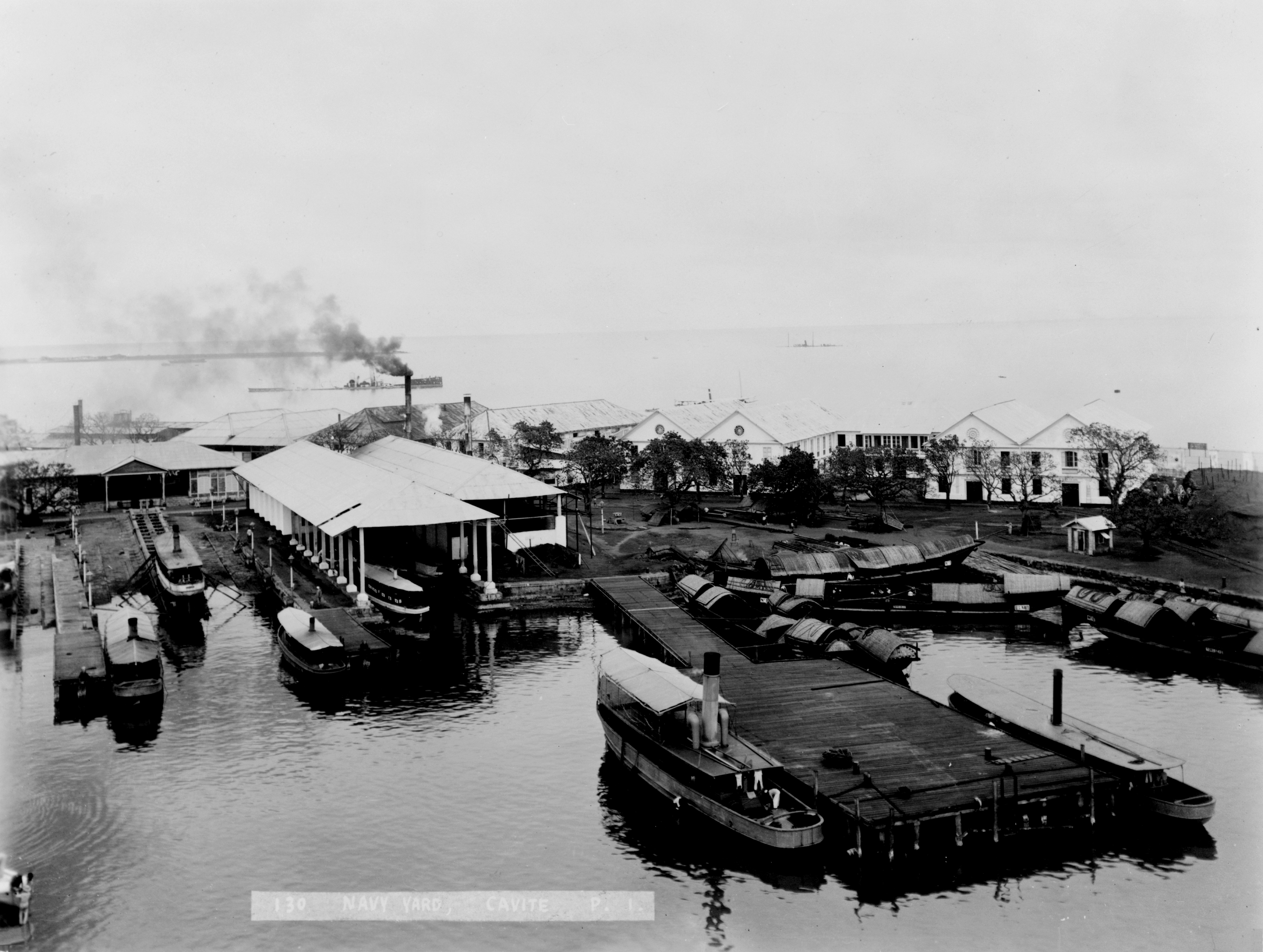
The Spanish Navy Yard at the Cavite Point in 1899, a year after the Americans took over.

Bacoor Bay is the enclosed body of water formed by the eastern shore of the peninsula, starting from the tip of the thumb (Cavite Point), circling to mainland Cavite province, continuing to the northern tip of Burunggoy Island (now Island Cove Hotel & Leisure Park).

=== Jurisdiction ===
The present and larger Cavite City has jurisdiction over most of the peninsula. Only a tiny portion at the southernmost part belongs to Noveleta. Dalahican in Cavite City is the first settlement of the city from Noveleta while San Rafael IV is the last barangay of Noveleta.

San Rafael IV is separated from Santa Isabel of Kawit, by the Grande River (Rio Grande of Cavite), also known as the San Juan River (incorrectly named as Ylang-ylang River on Google Maps). The location of the mouth of the Grande River in Noveleta and where Kawit ends on the river, is technically the start of the peninsula, at the average tide level.

=== Northernmost point ===
The northernmost point of the Cavite Peninsula is also the northernmost point of the province of Cavite located at the northern tip of the Danilo Atienza Air Base (Sangley) (14°30′1.6″N 120°54′43.2″E). For comparison, it is at the same latitude as the Parañaque Cathedral (14°30′1.6″N 120°59′30.32″E) directly located 8.6 km (5.3 mi) to the east of the northernmost point, about 2.8 km (1.7 mi) further north than the northernmost point of Cavite mainland located near the mouth of the Zapote River (14°28′31.6″N 120°58′11.5″E).

== Accessibility ==
Only one two-lane road, San Juan Road, connects the peninsula and its communities to mainland Cavite.

A faster alternative to the peninsula from Manila is the regular ferry service between the Cavite City Ferry Terminal behind the City Hall and the port near the SM Mall of Asia in Pasay, a direct distance of about 9.3 km (5.8 mi), linking the city to Metro Manila. The trip, which started on August 20, 2007, takes about 40 minutes compared to about 2 to 2.5 hours by land.
