= Sangley Point Airport =

Domestic airport serving Manila, Philippines

Sangley Point Airport Paliparan ng Punta Sangley Aeropuerto de Punta Sangley
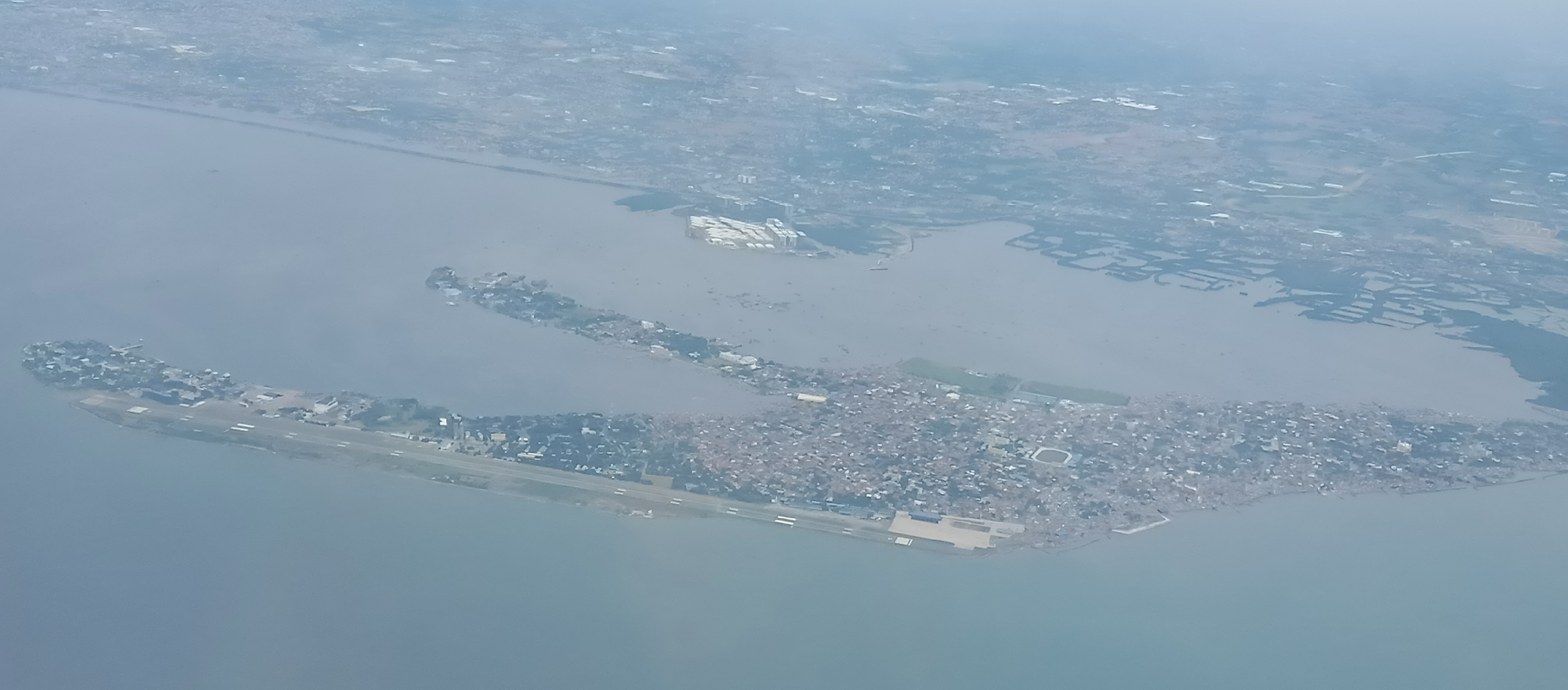
- Aerial view in 2022.
- IATA: SGL; ICAO: RPLS

Summary
- Airport type: Public / Military
- Owner/Operator: Civil Aviation Authority of the Philippines
- Serves: Greater Manila Area
- Location: Sangley Point, Cavite City, Cavite, Philippines
- Opened: February 15, 2020; 6 years ago
- Elevation AMSL: 8 ft (2.4 m)
- Coordinates: 14°29′28.74″N 120°53′37.99″E

Map
- Location within Luzon Location within Philippines

Runways
Direction	Length		Surface
Direction	ft	m	Surface
07/25	7,769	2,367	Asphalt

Statistics (2019)
- Passengers: None

Sangley Point Airport (IATA: SGL, ICAO: RPLS), also referred to as Cavite Airport, is a domestic airport at Sangley Point, Cavite City in the Philippines primarily serving general aviation and turbo-propped airliners in the general vicinity of South Luzon and the Greater Manila Area.

Currently a domestic airport, it will be later upgraded to an international airport adjacent to Danilo Atienza Air Base and will be served with either P2P buses or a ferry from SM Mall of Asia. It is the fourth commercial airport to serve the Greater Manila Area, complementing and helping to decongest its neighboring Ninoy Aquino International Airport (NAIA).

== History ==
=== Early proposals ===
In early 1993, a consortium brokered under the administration of President Fidel V. Ramos explored initial framework arrangements for a potential airport development project linked with entities in Guangzhou, China. However, the proposal faced immediate executive headwinds. President Ramos publicly prioritized the development of Clark International Airport (the former Clark Air Base) in Pampanga over Sangley Point, shelving early private-sector initiatives—such as one put forward by the Yuchengco group—to turn the Cavite peninsula base into a full-scale international airport.

The debate intensified in the late 1990s surrounding the construction and location choices of NAIA's newer terminals. Proponents of the Cavite site argued that selecting the congested site for NAIA Terminal 3 was a major strategic mistake. Critics noted that the existing Manila runway footprint was inherently prone to safety bottlenecks, highlighting an incident in July 1999 where a FedEx cargo plane overshot the runway, destroying landing lights and threatening localized disaster.

In July 2007, interest in Sangley's strategic location was revived when major maritime logistics firms proposed a multipurpose development. The plan aimed to build a comprehensive hub integrated with a container port, domestic/commercial airport, and an economic processing zone, laying the groundwork for the modern multi-use public-private partnership proposals for the area.

In 2013, the All-Asia Resources and Reclamation Corporation (ARRC) — a venture headed by tycoon Henry Sy — commissioned Danish construction firm Rambøll Group A.S. to conduct a feasibility study for the reclamation of 50 hectares off Sangley Point and the development of an airport with two runways and a terminal capable of handling 50 million passengers annually in place of the current air base. This was part of the so-called "Philippines Global Gateway" project proposed by the ARRC to the Philippine government in February 2016. The entire ARRC project involves the construction of an airport and seaport facility, as well as an industrial complex (ecozone), on land reclaimed from Manila Bay off Sangley Point; it is estimated to cost US$50 billion, involving among other things the reclamation of a total of 2,500 hectares of land and the construction of either an underwater tunnel to the SM Mall of Asia complex in Pasay or an extension of the Manila-Cavite Expressway to connect the project to Metro Manila.

=== Construction of domestic airport ===
In December 2016, the ARRC also proposed to the Duterte administration a plan to develop the existing Danilo Atienza Air Base and its 2.4 km long runway into a facility for low-cost carriers and general aviation "while waiting for the new airport." This proposal involves the construction of a ₱3.3-billion airport terminal. The air base's proposed conversion into a civil airport, if realized under this plan, is expected to reduce air traffic movements at Ninoy Aquino International Airport (NAIA) by 20%.

Amid the increasing congestion and flight delays in NAIA, then-President Rodrigo Duterte ordered in June 2019 the transfer of domestic and general aviation operations to Sangley. The DOTr said it was just awaiting the construction of a passenger terminal building, hangars, a new tower, night operations equipment, and asphalt overlay of its existing 2,300-meter runway. Nevertheless, the President directed the operations in Sangley Point to start immediately and specifically gave a November deadline of the same year.

By October 27, 2019, Sangley had its operational dry run, in which transportation Secretary Arthur Tugade called "a success". The same day also welcomed its first arrival, a Cebu Pacific Cargo turboprop plane. The domestic airport was officially inaugurated on February 15, 2020 by then-President Rodrigo Duterte.

=== Redevelopment into international airport ===
The bidding for the redevelopment of the airport was opened on December 17, 2019. The sole bidder consisting of a consortium of China Communications Construction Company and MacroAsia Corporation was awarded the contract on February 12, 2020, but the contract was terminated in January 2021 due to various deficiencies of the submission of requirements of the consortium.

Bidding was reopened in February 2021, but failed in October after no bids were submitted. In November 2021, the SPIA Development Consortium submitted an unsolicited proposal. The consortium, led by Cavitex Holdings Inc. and Yuchengco Group of Companies, is composed of MacroAsia Corporation, Samsung C&T Corporation of South Korea, Flughafen München GmbH (the management services arm of Munich Airport), and the London-based Arup Group. The consortium was granted the original proponent status in January 2022, and was awarded the contract on September 15 after successfully overcoming the Swiss challenge set by the provincial government.

The first phase of the project would involve the construction of the first of four runways. The airport would initially have a capacity of 25 million passengers annually, with plans to construct a second runway and expand capacity to 75 million passengers annually.

In July 2024, the Philippine Competition Commission approved the contract between the Cavite LGU and Yuchengco-led House of Investments and Luis Virata’s Cavitex Holdings Inc. consortium.

In May 2026, the US Trade and Development Agency (USTDA) announced it would fund feasibility and technical studies for the Sangley Point International Airport project. Fisherfolk groups in Cavite opposed United States funding for the development of the proposed airport, citing potential effects on fishing livelihoods and concerns about increased U.S. involvement in the area. Pamalakaya-Cavite said fishing communities have experienced disruptions whenever U.S. military activities occur in Manila Bay. The U.S. Trade and Development Agency announced funding for a feasibility study, which was awarded to Cavitex Holdings Inc., with California-based The S-A-P Group, LLC selected to conduct the study. The airport's location, a former U.S. naval base near the West Philippine Sea, has also raised security concerns among fisherfolk groups.

President Bongbong Marcos issued Administrative Order No. 44, creating a joint technical working group (JTWG) tasked with accelerating the development and completion of the airport.

== Facilities ==
The Sangley Point International Airport (SPIA) project involves the development of a new international airport in the area encompassing and surrounding Sangley Point. The project is planned as a modern, world-class and green international hub airport and a principal gateway to the Philippines.

The project consists of the development, design, financing, construction, operation and maintenance of the airport, Sangley Boulevard, and Sangley Point Cargo City.

=== Airport ===
The first development phase, SPIA Phase 1A, is designed to have a handling capacity of 15 million passengers per annum (MPPA). This is to be achieved through the construction of a 2,800 m (9,200 ft)-long runway on the northern or western side of the existing airport. Considering the orientation of the existing main runway at Ninoy Aquino International Airport (NAIA) and the high-rise buildings in central Manila, the proposed runway has an orientation of 05/23. The runway is to be constructed on reclaimed land and is designed to accommodate a taxiway located parallel to the runway in order to maximize the capacity of the new runway system.

The new runway is to be connected to the passenger terminal building through two parallel taxiways. The new passenger terminal building, including associated aircraft stands, is planned to be constructed partly on the existing island and partly on reclaimed land south of the island. The passenger terminal building area is planned to have sufficient space to accommodate approximately 50 aircraft stands. The existing passenger terminal building area is intended to be used for general aviation operations.

In addition to the new runway and passenger terminal building, Phase 1A includes an air traffic control tower, a rescue and firefighting station, and landside car-parking areas.

The development of Phase 1A is to be accommodated in several sub-phases to maintain airport operations during construction. The first step includes construction of the new 2,800 m (9,200 ft)-long runway. Once the runway becomes operational, the runway of the existing Sangley Airport is to be decommissioned, followed by construction of the new passenger terminal building and aircraft stands. The existing island site is to be raised to withstand future sea-level rise and enable drainage.

=== Phase 1B ===
The subsequent development of SPIA provides for further expansion of the airport facilities and associated infrastructure. The Phase 1B development forms part of the overall phased development plan for the airport and provides for the expansion of the airport site and its facilities prior to the construction of additional runways in later phases.

=== Phase 2 ===
Within this sub-project expansion, the single-runway airport is planned to be expanded to a two-runway airport capable of serving up to 75 MPPA.

The expansion provides the additional runway and associated airport facilities required to increase the passenger-handling capacity of SPIA. The overall development plan allows the airport to transition from the initial single-runway configuration established during Phase 1 to a dual-runway configuration.

=== Phases 3 to 4 ===
In consecutive development phases, the airport can be expanded to a four-runway system capable of serving up to 130 MPPA. The midfield area between the runways, with two runways on each side, is planned to be sufficiently large to accommodate two passenger terminal buildings, including terminal satellites.

During the first development phase of SPIA, the airport is planned to co-exist with NAIA. In Phase 2, SPIA would be developed into a dual-runway airport when it is decided to limit NAIA operations to SPIA's ensure technical and financial viability.

The ultimate development configuration therefore provides for a four-runway airport with passenger terminals located in the midfield area between the runway systems. The phased arrangement is intended to allow airport capacity to be expanded progressively in accordance with passenger demand and the operational requirements of the Manila metropolitan area.

=== Sangley Point Cargo City ===
Sangley Point Cargo City (SPCC) is a planned cargo and logistics development forming part of the integrated SPIA project. It is intended to cater to the expected substantial air-cargo volume passing through the airport, whether domestic or international.

Sangley Point Cargo City is bounded by major thoroughfares, with Sangley Boulevard to the west and CAVITEX to the south. It has a maximum usable land area of approximately 190 hectares. The SPCC is intended to be a preferred facility for customs brokers, freight forwarders, door-to-door couriers, warehouse and cold-storage operators, and e-commerce fulfillment centers.

Because of the integrated design of SPIA, occupants of Sangley Point Cargo City are planned to have direct access to the airport, providing efficiencies in their respective operations. The facility is intended to provide a professional environment and enhanced competitiveness for air-cargo operators and to support the development of SPIA and the Philippine economy.

== Transportation ==
The transportation component of the SPIA project includes the development of Sangley Boulevard as the principal high-speed access road or expressway and overland transportation link to and from the new airport.

=== Sangley Boulevard ===
Sangley Boulevard is a planned 4.90 km (3.04 mi) expressway connecting Sangley Point International Airport with the existing road network. The proposed alignment extends from CAVITEX Segment 4 near Island Cove, traverses Bacoor Bay and the San Felipe Peninsula, and ends at SPIA.

The boulevard is intended to directly connect with the existing CAVITEX, providing access to Metro Manila, and is also intended to provide links to the proposed Cavite–Laguna Expressway (CALAX).

The project documentation describes Sangley Boulevard as the main transport facility to Sangley Point International Airport. The alignment includes sections constructed on embankment and bridge structures across the bay. Typical sections of the boulevard include elevated embankment road sections and bridge sections designed to cross the waterway between the mainland and Sangley Point.

The Sangley Point project site is approximately 31 road kilometres from Ninoy Aquino International Airport (NAIA). Under existing conditions, the site was described as approximately 45 minutes away by land via the NAIA Access Road connecting to CAVITEX and using the normal land route. When Sangley Boulevard becomes operational, the project site is projected to be reached in 15 minutes or less by land through CAVITEX and Sangley Boulevard.

=== Cargo and road connectivity ===
Sangley Boulevard also provides the principal surface-transport connection for the planned Sangley Point Cargo City. The cargo city is situated along the transportation corridor between the airport and the existing road network, allowing cargo operators, freight forwarders, warehouses, cold-storage facilities and other logistics businesses to access the airport directly.

The integrated development of SPIA, Sangley Boulevard and Sangley Point Cargo City is intended to establish a combined passenger, air-cargo and surface-transport network. The road connection is designed to facilitate the movement of passengers, employees, cargo and airport-related traffic between Sangley Point, Cavite and Metro Manila.

=== Phased transport development ===
The construction of Sangley Boulevard forms part of the initial development of SPIA and is intended to provide access to the airport as the airport's capacity is expanded through successive phases. The ultimate airport development, including the expansion from a single-runway airport to a two-runway and eventually a four-runway system, is supported by the planned road and cargo infrastructure.

== Airlines and destinations ==
=== Passenger ===
Airlines	Destinations
Alphaland Aviation	Charter: Balesin

== See also ==
- Danilo Atienza Air Base
- List of airports in the Greater Manila Area
  - Clark International Airport
  - Ninoy Aquino International Airport
  - New Manila International Airport
