= List of airports in the Greater Manila Area =

Aerodromes around the Philippine capital

This is a list of airports in the Greater Manila Area, the most populous urban agglomeration in the Philippines. Though there are several definitions over what comprises the area, for the purposes of this article the entire administrative region of Metro Manila and the surrounding provinces of Bataan, Batangas, Bulacan, Cavite, Laguna, Pampanga and Rizal are considered its components.

The majority of passenger traffic goes through Metro Manila's Ninoy Aquino International Airport (NAIA), which is the Philippines' busiest airport and major hub. Clark International Airport, which has been developed into an alternate international gateway, also sees a significant amount of traffic. Subic Bay International Airport (SBIA), although classified as an international airport by the Civil Aviation Authority of the Philippines (CAAP), currently only hosts domestic flights.

== Commercial airports ==
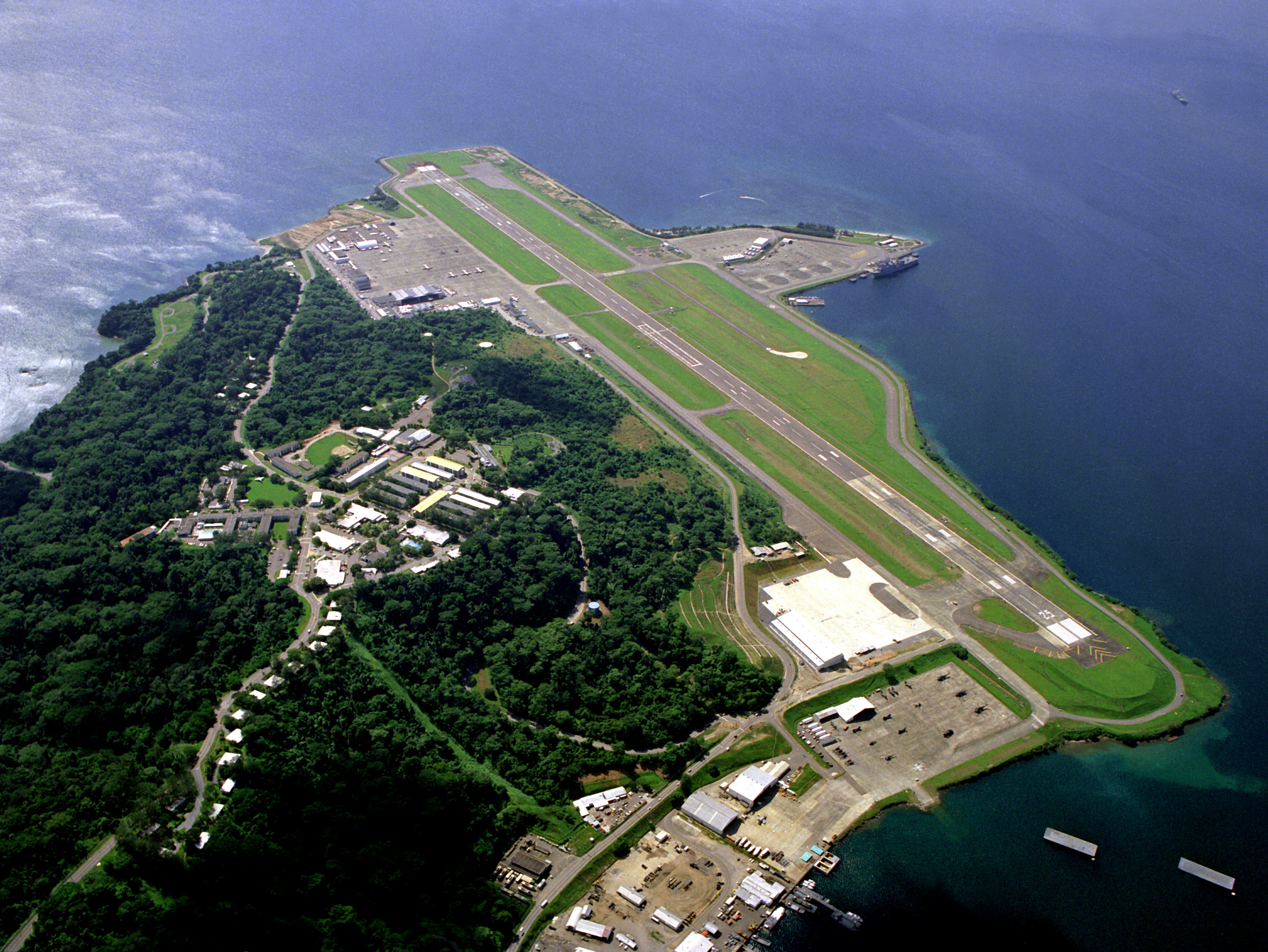
Subic Bay International Airport

Airport name	IATA	ICAO	Location	Coordinates
Clark International Airport	CRK	RPLC	Clark Freeport (Angeles City/Mabalacat)	15°11′09″N 120°33′35″E
Ninoy Aquino International Airport	MNL	RPLL	Parañaque/Pasay	14°30′31″N 121°01′10″E
Sangley Point Airport	SGL	RPLS	Cavite City	14°29′29″N 120°53′38″E
Subic Bay International Airport	SFS	RPLB	Subic Bay Freeport (Morong)	14°47′40″N 120°16′16″E

== Military airfields ==
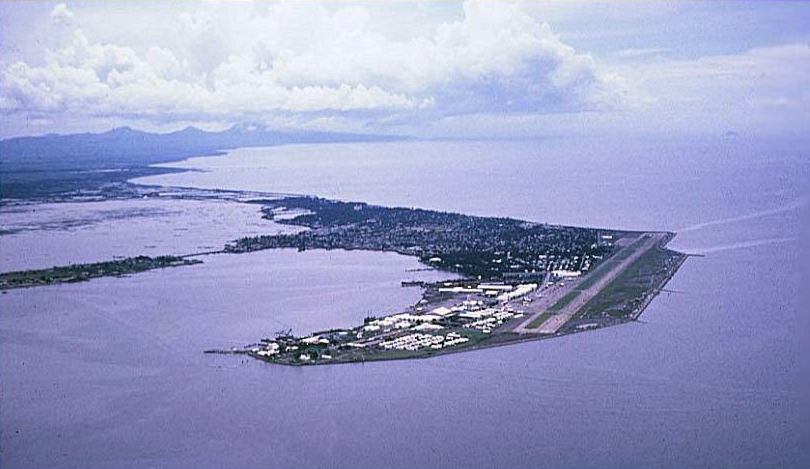
Danilo Atienza Air Base

The following airports are operated by branches of the Armed Forces of the Philippines for military or mixed military-civilian use.

Airport name	IATA	ICAO	Location	Coordinates
Basilio Fernando Air Base		RPUL	Lipa	13°57′17″N 121°07′29″E
Camp Mateo Capinpin Airfield			Tanay	14°32′05″N 121°21′49″E
Cesar Basa Air Base		RPUF	Floridablanca	14°59′11″N 120°29′33″E
Clark Air Base	CRK	RPLC	Clark Freeport (Mabalacat)	15°11′09″N 120°33′35″E
Danilo Atienza Air Base	SGL	RPLS	Cavite City	14°29′29″N 120°53′38″E
Jesus Villamor Air Base	MNL	RPLL	Pasay	14°30′31″N 121°01′10″E

== General aviation airports ==
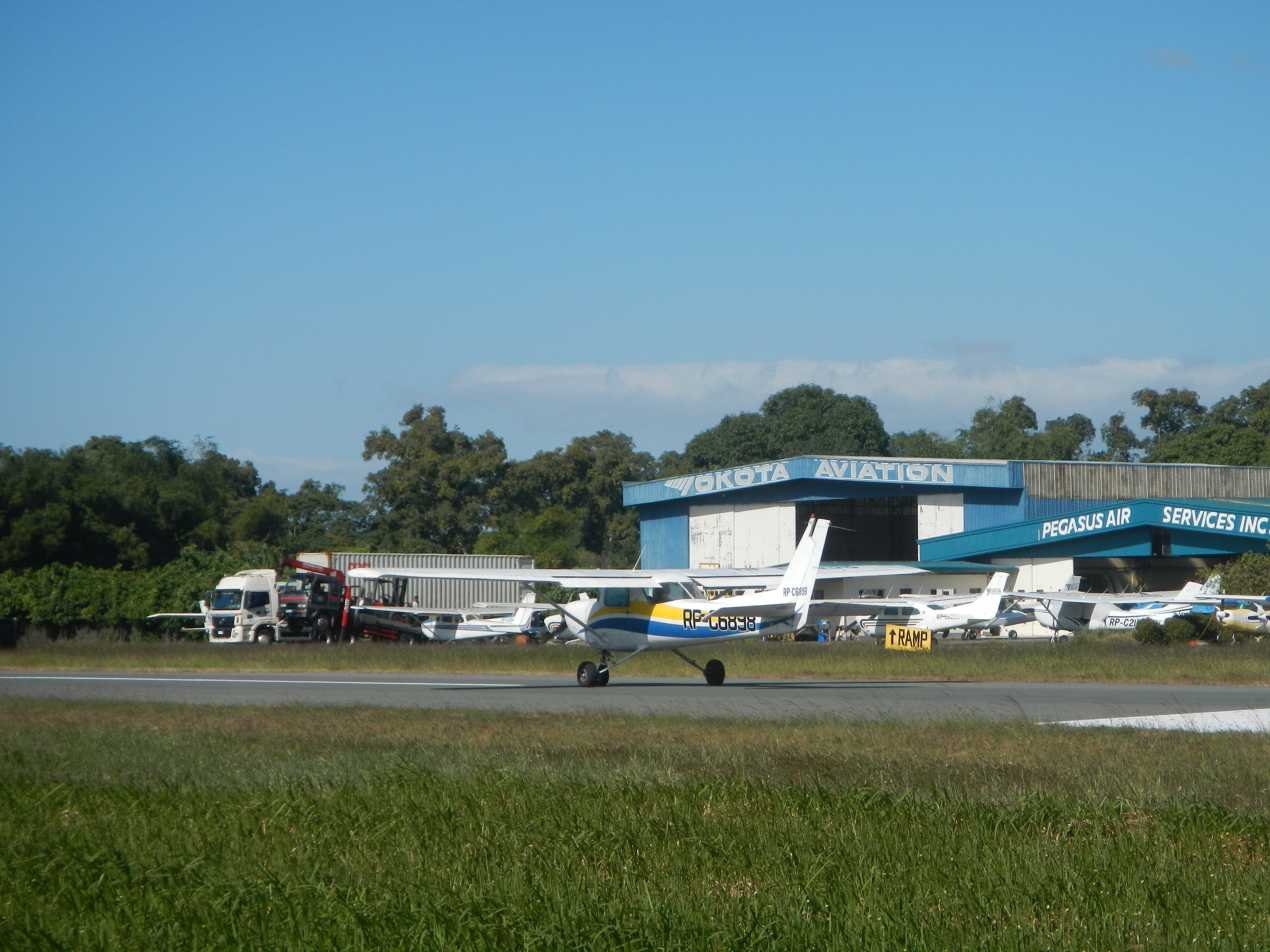
Plaridel Airport

Airport name	IATA	ICAO	Location	Coordinates
Barradas (Mannie W. Barradas/Santor) Airfield			Tanauan	14°5′49″N 121°6′58″E
Calatagan (Hacienda Zobel) Airstrip			Calatagan	13°50′37″N 120°38′5″E
OMNI Aviation Complex		RPLC	Mabalacat	15°10′08″N 120°33′49″E
Plaridel Airport		RPUX	Plaridel	14°53′26″N 120°51′10″E
Woodland Airpark (Gordon Boyce Airfield)			Magalang	15°15′02″N 120°40′39″E

== Water aerodromes ==
Airport name	IATA	ICAO	Location	Coordinates
Air Juan Manila Harbor Seaplane Terminal			Manila	14°33′24″N 120°58′46″E
CCP Bay Terminal			Manila	14°33′30″N 120°58′59″E

== Heliports ==
Name	Owner / Operator	Location	Coordinates
INAEC Clark Hangar	Iloilo-Negros Air Express	Mabalacat	15°11′32″N 120°32′54″E
INAEC Manila Hangar	Iloilo-Negros Air Express	Pasay	14°31′4″N 121°0′7″E
St. Luke's Medical Center – Global City	St. Luke's Medical Center, Inc.	Taguig	14°33′18″N 121°2′53″E
SM City North Edsa	SM Prime Holdings	Quezon City	14°39′24″N 121°1′58″E
Tagaytay Track Oval	Local Government of Tagaytay	Tagaytay	14°5′59″N 120°56′22″E
The Peninsula Manila	Hongkong and Shanghai Hotels	Makati	14°33′18″N 121°1′31″E
V&A Law Center	Villaraza & Angangco Law Firm	Taguig	14°33′32″N 121°3′23″E

== Others ==
Airport name	IATA	ICAO	Location	Coordinates
Bundagul (TIPCO) Airstrip			Mabalacat	15°14′26″N 120°35′56″E
Minuyan Airstrip			Norzagaray	14°56′15″N 121°4′51″E

== Proposed new Manila airport ==
As early as the 1980s, there has been recognition of the constraints to expanding Manila (later renamed Ninoy Aquino) International Airport's capacity and its continued ability to handle the projected growth in aircraft movements and passenger traffic.

In May 2011, the Japan International Cooperation Agency (JICA) submitted to the Philippine Government a study concerning air transport needs within the Greater Manila Area, which concluded that the development of a new gateway airport was "an urgent need" given that the runway capacity at the existing Ninoy Aquino International Airport (NAIA) was "already almost saturated."

The Philippine Government during the term of President Benigno Aquino III responded by adopting a dual airport system in May 2013, which entailed the upgrade of the facilities at Ninoy Aquino International Airport while also expanding capacity at Clark International Airport.

=== JICA study ===
In October 2013 the Aquino administration requested JICA to conduct a pre-feasibility study to determine the best location of the new gateway airport recommended in the 2011 JICA study. After considering the cost and viability of five options the pre-feasibility study identified two potential sites for the airport: Sangley Point and Laguna de Bay which would both involve reclaiming at least 2,000 hectares of land.

On 13 June 2014 JICA formally recommended the construction of a new airport in the vicinity of Sangley Point, Cavite City, with the lower cost being among the factors considered: reclaiming land in that area will cost only ₱120 billion (US$2.4 billion) compared to ₱240 billion at Laguna de Bay (US$4.8 billion). With this recommendation JICA began to work on a full feasibility study for the new Sangley Point-area airport, with 2025 as the target date for its opening.

The full feasibility study has two phases: the first phase will compare two potential sites in the vicinity of Sangley Point, while the second phase will involve an "in-depth" analysis on the chosen location. The study's final recommendation is expected to endorse one of two options: building the airport on the same site as the Danilo Atienza Air Base on Sangley Point at a cost of US$10 billion, or constructing on reclaimed land in central Manila Bay between the air base and another reclaimed area at a cost of US$13 billion. The airport, expected to be commercially operational by 2025 at the earliest, will initially have two runways but can be expanded to four runways capable of handling 700,000 aircraft movements and 130 million passengers annually.

The full study was initially expected to be completed by April 2015, then later moved to June 2015. The target date for the full study's completion was again moved by JICA to early 2016, around January or February, causing the government's timetables for the project's implementation to be pushed back. Although the outgoing administration of Noynoy Aquino called on JICA to finish the full study before his term was to expire on 30 June 2016, it was revealed in February 2016 that JICA will likely complete the study in 18 more months, or around August 2017.

=== Unsolicited proposals from the private sector ===
Competing proposals from San Miguel Corporation headed by Ramon Ang and the All-Asia Resources and Reclamation Corporation (ARRC) venture headed by Henry Sy have been submitted for the Philippine Government's consideration as early as 2013.

In February 2015 the then-Secretary of the Department of Transportation and Communications (DoTC) Joseph Emilio Abaya announced they will no longer entertain unsolicited proposals from private groups given that they "spark controversies" that detract from the "open, transparent bidding" they intended for the project. This was reversed in March 2017 by the Duterte administration, whose revamped Department of Transportation (DoTr) expressed interest in developing already-existing and new airports — instead of the previous plan of constructing only one gateway — to help decongest Manila's Ninoy Aquino International Airport (NAIA). The reversal was made against the advice of the National Economic and Development Authority (NEDA), which in the interest of promoting transparency and preventing charges of unethical dealmaking recommended on 27 October 2016 that the development project for the new Manila airport be subject to competitive bidding rather than through unsolicited mode, given that at least five other private sector groups are keen on undertaking the said project.

In order that it can consolidate private sector proposals so that the efforts for decongesting NAIA are made more coherent, the DoTr put on hold in February 2017 the ₱74.56-billion (US$1.5 billion) NAIA Development Project which would have upgraded the airport's existing facilities to higher international standards and would have expanded the airport if necessary.

Currently there are two unsolicited proposals from Ramon Ang-led San Miguel Corporation and the Henry Sy-backed All-Asia Resources and Reclamation Corporation (ARRC) venture group for the establishment of new airport to serve the Greater Manila Area. The ARRC proposal is reportedly "up for approval" by NEDA as of 12 December 2016. SMC's proposal on the other hand has been approved, but is still subject to a final examination of the concession agreement, followed by a Swiss challenge

- San Miguel Corporation (SMC) proposals:
  - The most recent proposal submitted to the Department of Transportation, as of February 2017, the construction of an airport with two parallel 3.5 km-long runways under a BOT scheme. The 1,168-hectare airport complex can be then upgraded to four runways capable of handling 100 million passengers, and to a maximum of six runways capable of handling 150 million passengers. The airport is part of a larger 2,500-hectare, ₱700-billion (US$14-billion) "aerotropolis" in Bulacan, Bulacan. The said project is planned to be linked to the North Luzon Expressway at Marilao and the MRT Line 7 by an expressway which SMC will also build. Ramon Ang has hinted at this project since at least early 2012.
  - In May 2014, Ramon Ang approached the Aquino government with a proposal to construct a US$10-billion new airport located on reclaimed land owned by CyberBay Corporation along the Manila-Cavite Expressway. The facility would be capable of handling 75 million passengers annually, but can be expandable to four runways which would increase the capacity to 100 million passengers.
- All-Asia Resources and Reclamation Corporation (ARRC) proposals:
  - The most recent proposal reportedly being considered by NEDA, as of February 2017, is the construction of a US$20 billion (₱1.3 trillion) airport and seaport facility on land reclaimed from Manila Bay off Sangley Point as part of the so-called "Philippines Global Gateway" project, which also includes an industrial complex (ecozone). The entire ARRC project is estimated to cost US$50 billion, involving among other things the reclamation of a total of 2,500 hectares of land and the construction of either an underwater tunnel to the SM Mall of Asia complex in Pasay or an extension of the Manila-Cavite Expressway to connect the project to Metro Manila. In 2013, the ARRC commissioned Danish construction firm Rambøll Group A.S. to conduct a feasibility study for the airport component of the project, which calls for the reclamation of 50 hectares off Sangley Point and the development of an airport with two runways and a terminal capable of handling 50 million passengers annually.
  - In December 2016 the ARRC also proposed to the Duterte administration a plan to develop the existing Danilo Atienza Air Base (Sangley Point Airport) and its 2.4 km long runway into a facility for low-cost carriers and general aviation "while waiting for the new airport." This proposal involves the construction of a ₱3.3-billion airport terminal. The air base's conversion into a civil airport is expected to reduce air traffic movements at NAIA by 20%.

== Notable historical airports ==
- Balara Airfield in Quezon City (closed 1945; now Balara Filters Park and University of the Philippines Diliman)
- Bataan Airfield in Limay (closed 1945)
- Camp Olivas (Moras) Airfield in San Fernando
- Clark Air Base in Angeles (closed 1991; now Clark International Airport)
- Del Carmen Airfield in Floridablanca (closed 1945)
- Grace Park Airfield (Manila North) in Caloocan (the first commercial airfield in Manila; closed 1946; redeveloped into residential zone)
- Kindley Landing Field in Corregidor (closed 1942)
- Marikina Airfield in Marikina (closed 1942)
- Naval Air Station Cubi Point in Morong (closed 1991; now Subic Bay International Airport)
- Naval Station Sangley Point in Cavite City (closed 1971; now Sangley Point Airport and Danilo Atienza Air Base)
- Nichols Field in Parañaque and Pasay (closed 1946; now Villamor Air Base and Ninoy Aquino International Airport)
- Nielson Field in Makati (closed 1948; redeveloped into the Makati Central Business District)
- Pasig Airfield in Pasig (closed 1942)
- Porac Airfield in Porac (closed 1945)
- Quezon Airfield in Quezon City (closed 1945; now North Avenue)
- Samal (Bataan 2020, Inc.) Airstrip in Samal
- Zablan Airfield (Manila East) in Quezon City (closed 1945; redeveloped into White Plains gated community)

== See also ==
- List of airports in the Philippines
