= Sangley Point National High School =

Public high school in Cavite, Philippines

Location
- Cavite City; Philippines
- Coordinates: 14°29′35″N 120°54′27″E

Information
- Type: Public
- Established: 2001
- Grades: 7 to 12
- Color: Gray

Sangley Point National High School (SPNHS; Filipino: Pambansang Mataas na Paaralan ng Sangley Point) is a public high school in Cavite City, Philippines. It has total land area of 6100 sq.m., and is situated amongst residential units along La Naval Road inside the Naval Station Heracleo Alano in Sangley Point.

== History ==
As a former annex of Cavite National High School, SPNHS was founded as Cavite National High School Sangley Annex. It was renamed Sangley Point National High School after being made an independent national high school by virtue of Republic Act 9113, which was enacted on September 10, 2001. The move of making it an independent national high school was spearheaded by the administrators of the school and the division at that time and the resolution authored by Cong. Plaridel Abaya. Presently, the school is catering to five hundred seventy two (572) high school students, dependent and non-military dependents. Most of its students reside inside the base and the barangays situated near NBC.
