= Swiss challenge =

Swiss challenge may refer to:

- Swiss challenge (procurement), a process in public procurement when a public authority which has received an unsolicited bid for a project publishes details of the bid and invites third parties to match or exceed it
- Swiss Challenge, a golf tournament that is part of the Challenge Tour, held in Switzerland
- Swiss Challenge League, the second highest tier of the Swiss football league system.
