= Cañacao Bay =

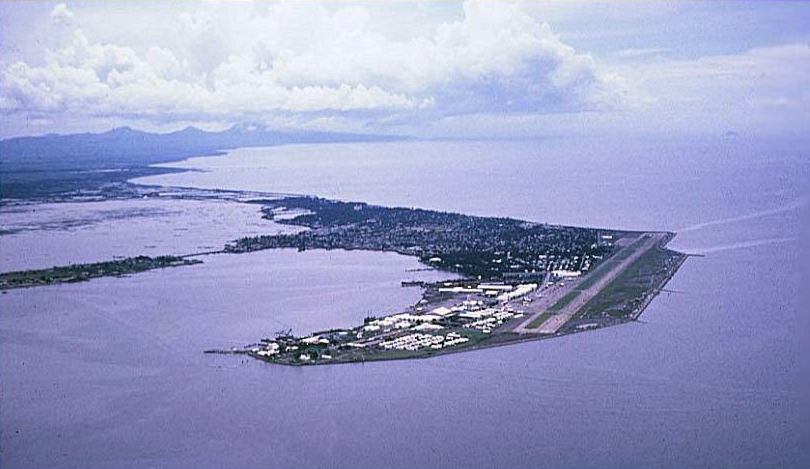
- Cañacao Bay is the body of water left of the Sangley Point airstrip.

- Location in Luzon Location in the Philippines
- Location: Luzon Island, Philippines
- Coordinates: 14.4889°N 120.8518°E
- Type: bay
- Part of: Manila Bay
- Settlements: Cavite City

Cañacao Bay is a small bay located within the larger Manila Bay in the Philippines.

It is located along the northeastern end of the Cavite Peninsula and Cavite City in the province of Cavite.

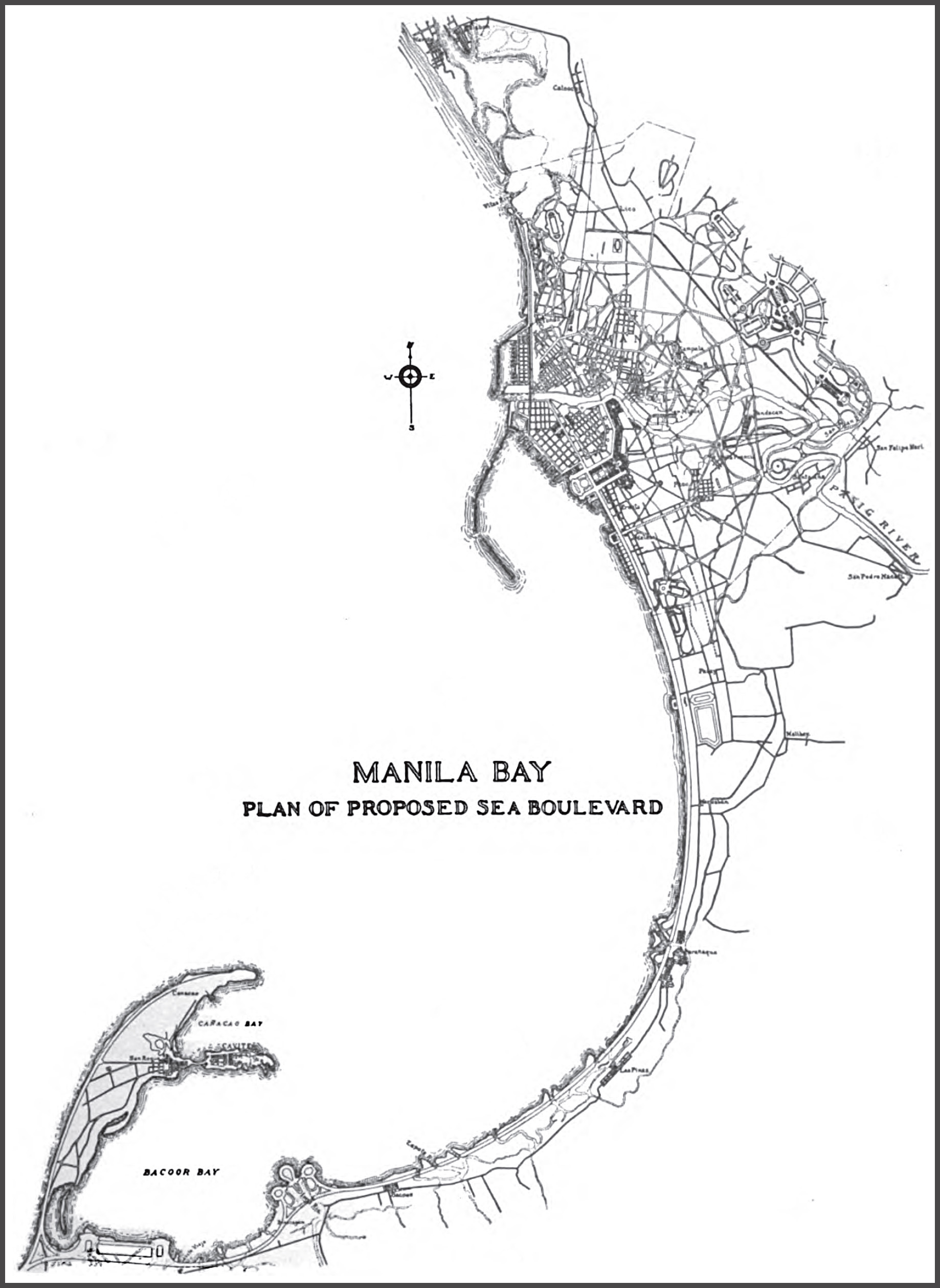
Section of Manila Bay near Manila showing the location of Cañacao Bay from Manila

The Danilo Atienza Air Base of the Philippine Air Force is along the northern coast of the bay, and the Naval Base Cavite of the Philippine Navy is along the southern coast. Both military bases previously comprised the Naval Station Sangley Point of the United States.

The Cavite City Hall is immediately south of the bay, with a pier for public ferry service to Metro Manila.

The shore of the bay near the former Cavite Royal Arsenal was where the province's patron saint, an icon known as Our Lady of Solitude of Porta Vaga, was found during the Spanish colonial period following a Marian apparition.

== See also ==
- Cavite City
