= Polillo Islands =

Island group in Quezon, Philippines

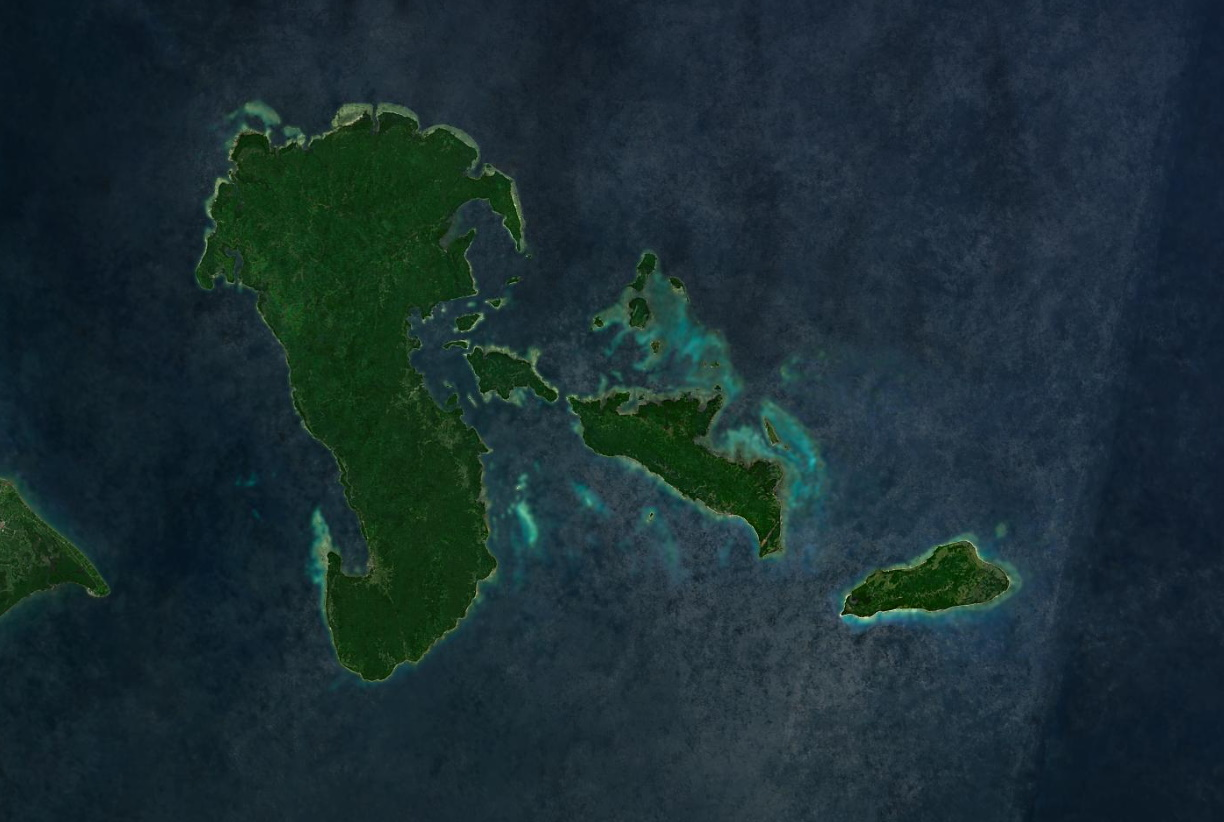
- Satellite image of the Polillo Islands

- Location within Luzon Location within Philippines

Geography
- Location: Philippine Sea
- Coordinates: 14°51′N 122°04′E
- Total islands: 27
- Major islands: Polillo; Patnanungan; Jomalig
- Area: 2.95 sq mi (7.6 km^{2})
- Highest elevation: 1,150 ft (351 m)
- Highest point: Mount Malulod

Administration
- Philippines
- Region: Calabarzon
- Province: Quezon
- Municipality: Polillo; Burdeos; Panukulan; Patnanungan; Jomalig
- Largest municipality: Polillo (pop. 31,908)

Demographics
- Population: 95,647 (2020)

The Polillo Islands is a group of about 27 islands in the Philippine Sea lying about 25 km (16 mi) to the east of the Philippine island of Luzon. It is separated from the mainland Luzon Island by the Polillo Strait and forms the northern side of Lamon Bay. The islands are part of the province of Quezon in the Calabarzon region of the Philippines. The combined land area of all the islands is about 875 square kilometers making Polillo islands even larger than the island city-state of Singapore.

== Major islands ==
The three major islands are:

- Polillo Island
- Patnanungan Island
- Jomalig Island

These islands comprise the towns of Polillo, Patnanungan, Jomalig, Panukulan and Burdeos.

The biggest Polillo Island is divided into three municipalities of Polillo, Burdeos, and Panukulan.

Burdeos Bay lies in between the islands of Patnanungan and Polillo

Polillo also includes the privately owned resort island of Balesin, located further south in the middle of Lamon Bay.

- Polillo (southern part of Polillo Island, including Balesin Island)
- Burdeos (northeastern part of Polillo Island, including smaller islands like Palasan, Kalotkot, and Kalongkooan)
- Panukulan (northwestern part of Polillo Island)
- Patnanungan (middle island)
- Jomalig (easternmost island)

== Gallery ==
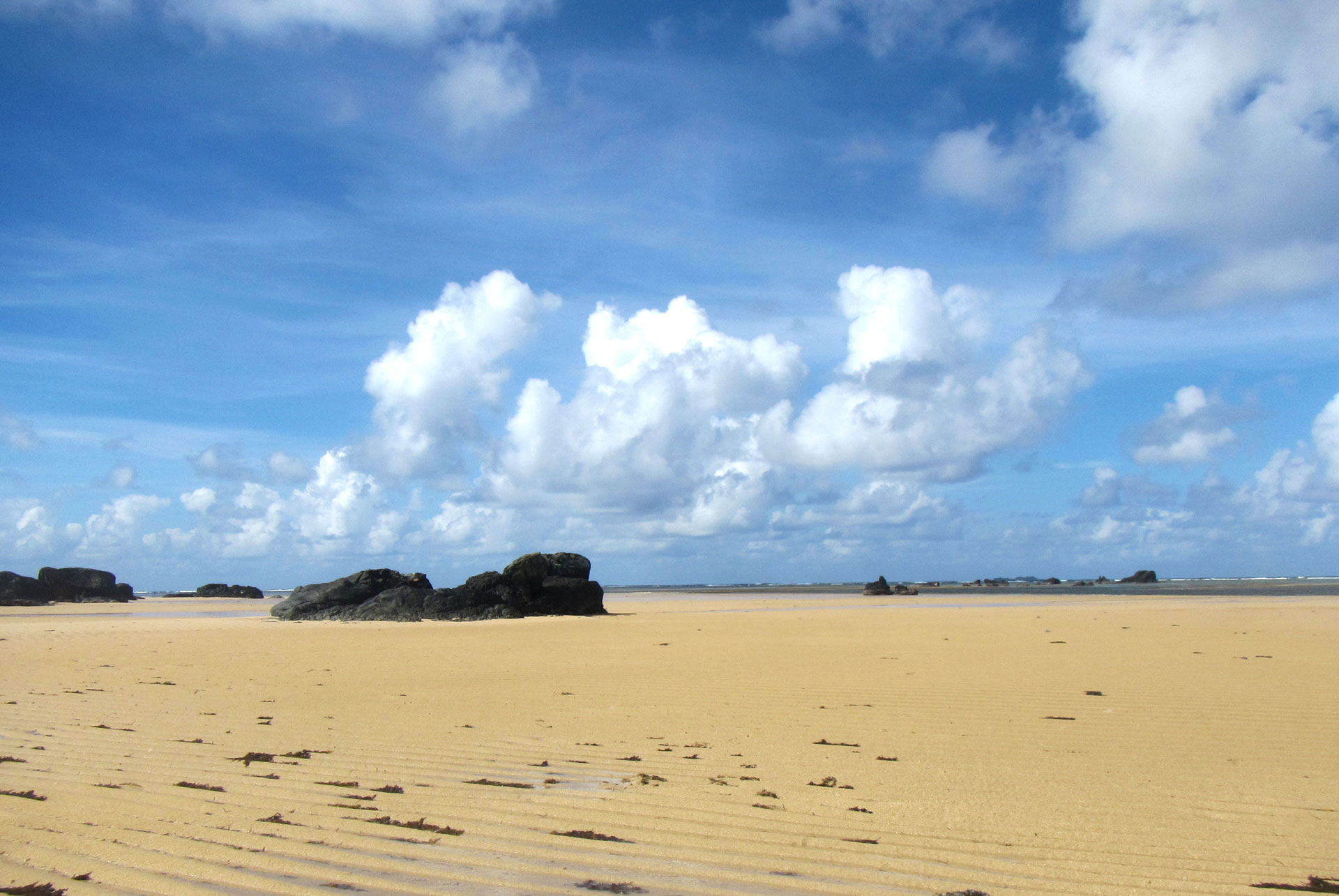
Kanaway beach in Jomalig

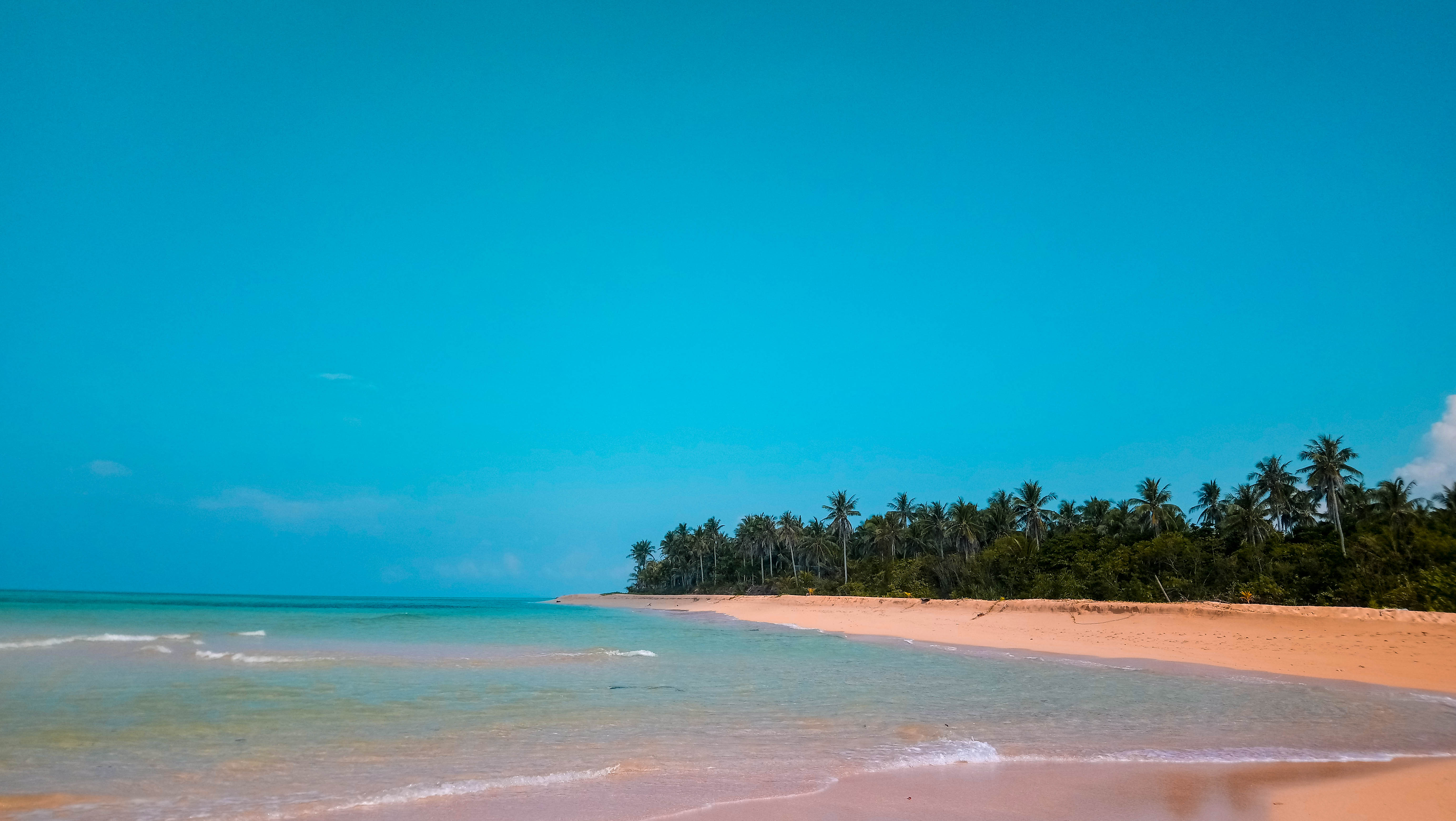
A beach in southeastern Jomalig

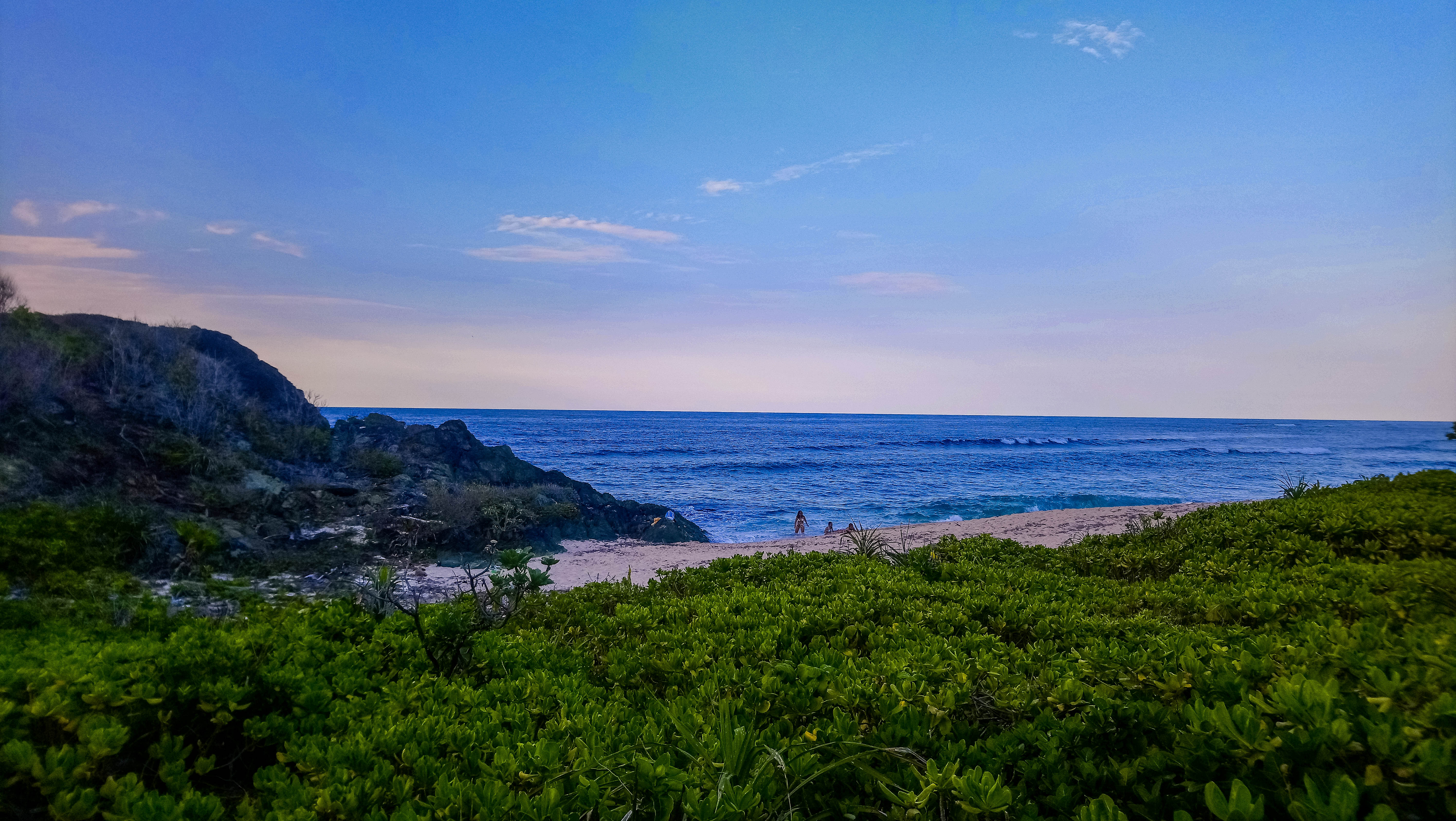
Lingayen Cove in Jomalig

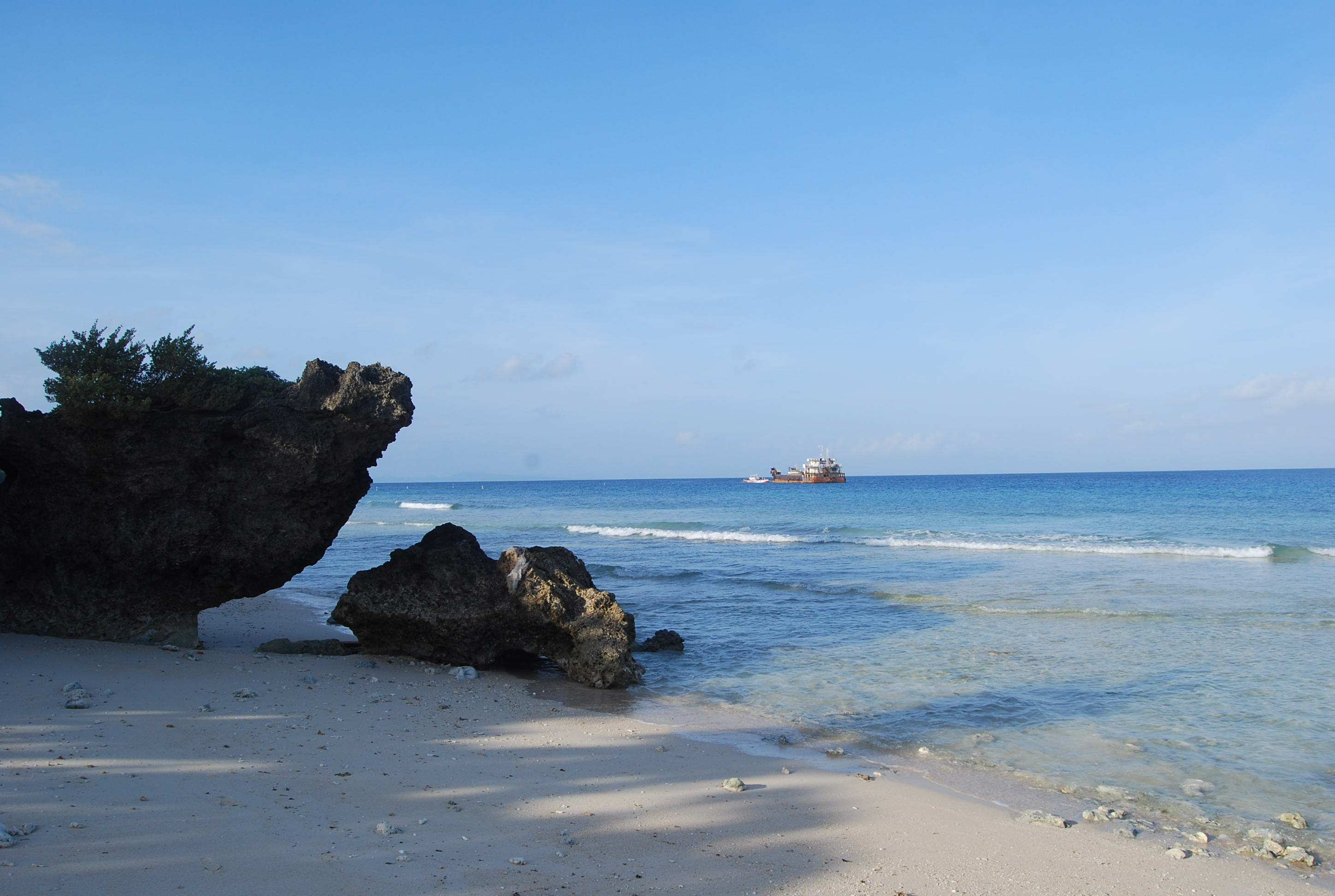
A beach in Balesin

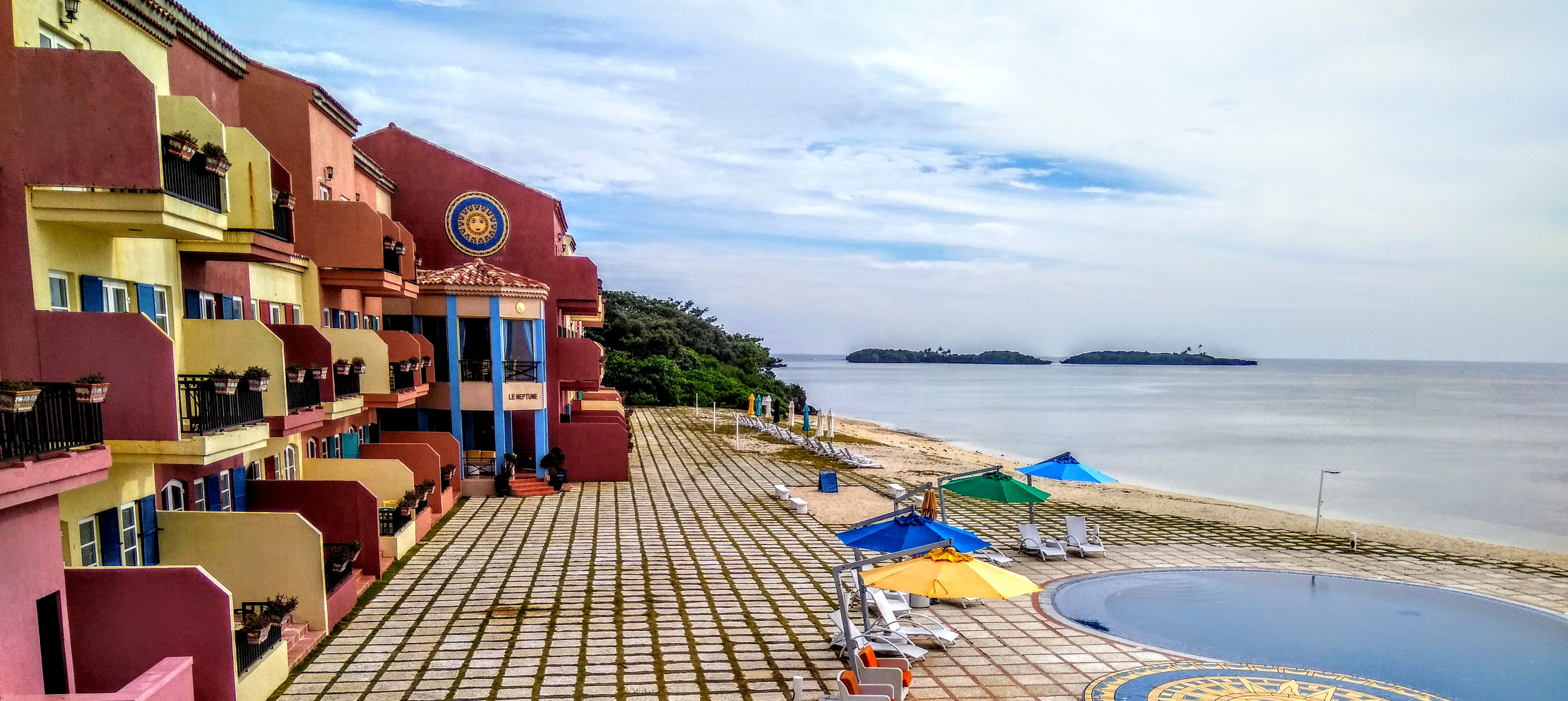
Themed accommodations at the Balesin Island Club

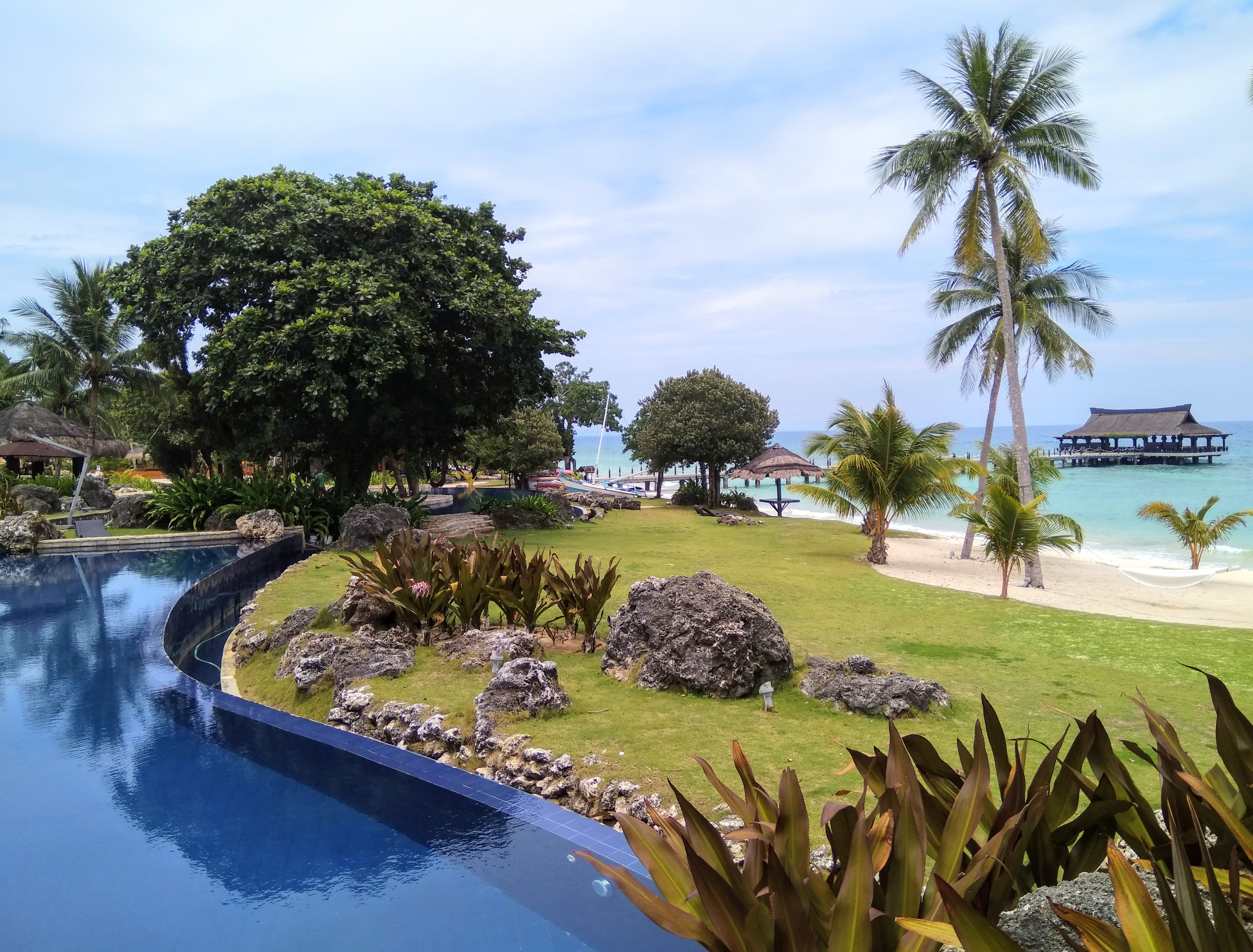
Resort grounds in Balesin
