= Danilo Atienza =

Filipino pilot (1951-1989)

Danilo S. Atienza
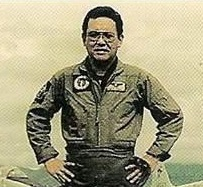
- Born: April 24, 1951
- Died: December 1, 1989 (aged 38); Sangley Air Field, Philippines
- Military career
- Allegiance: Philippines
- Branch: Philippine Air Force
- Service years: 1974–1989
- Rank: Major
- Commands: 6th Tactical Squadron
- Conflicts: 1989 Philippine coup attempt
- Awards: Medal of Valor

Danilo S. Atienza (April 24, 1951 – December 1, 1989) was a Filipino pilot in the Philippine Air Force.

Atienza started out as a Philippine Air Force cadet at Basilio Fernando Air Base in Lipa City, where he was commissioned a second lieutenant in 1974. After assignments with the 5th Fighter Wing at Cesar Basa Air Base, Pampanga, Atienza became Squadron Commander of the 6th Tactical Squadron.

On December 1, 1989, Air Force officers joined a coup attempt led by the Reform the Armed Forces Movement. Atienza turned his F-5 fighter against the rebels who established a stronghold at Sangley Field. In bombing and strafing runs, amid heavy rebel ground fire, he and two other combat pilots destroyed one Sikorsky S-76 helicopter, seven T-28's and a fuel depot, depriving the rebel soldiers of air power. This action turned the tide of battle to the government's favor.

However, Atienza was killed that day after his plane went down in unclear circumstances. President Corazon C. Aquino awarded him the Medal of Valor. On May 5, 1992, by an act of Congress, the airfield at Sangley Point Naval and Air Training Station was renamed Danilo Atienza Air Base.
