= E. L. Tordesillas Airport =

Airport in Polillo, Quezon, Philippines

E. L. Tordesillas Airport Paliparan ng E. L. Tordesillas
- IATA: BSI; ICAO: RPLE

Summary
- Airport type: Private
- Owner/Operator: Alphaland Corp.
- Location: Balesin Island, Polillo, Quezon
- Elevation AMSL: 8 m / 25 ft
- Coordinates: 14°25′09″N 122°02′21″E

Map
- Location in Luzon Location in the Philippines

Runways
Direction	Length		Surface
Direction	m	ft	Surface
05/23	1,527	5,010	Concrete
- Sources: Balesin Island Club

E. L. Tordesillas Airport (Filipino: Paliparan ng E. L. Tordesillas) (IATA: BSI, ICAO: RPLE), also known as Balesin Airport, is a private airport serving Balesin Island, an island under the jurisdiction of Polillo, Quezon but currently occupied and operated by Alphaland Corporation as a membership resort.

It is named after the island's original owner Edgardo Tordesillas. The runway is paved with concrete, and has a length of about 1,500 meters. The airport is currently served by charter flights for resort guests.

The runway also serves as a rainwater catchment. Its constructed at a certain angle to redirect freshwater to nearby reservoirs and ponds.

== Airlines and destinations ==
Airlines	Destinations
Alphaland Aviation	Charter: Manila–Sangley Point

== Accidents and incidents ==
- On October 19, 2013, a SkyJet aircraft, on a flight chartered by Alphaland Corporation to bring tourists to Balesin Island, overshot the runway by 200 meters. No injuries were reported but the aircraft was damaged beyond repair.

== See also ==
- List of airports in the Philippines
