= Naval Station Pascual Ledesma =

Philippine Navy Base in Cavite City

- Fort San Felipe, San Roque, Cavite City in the Philippines
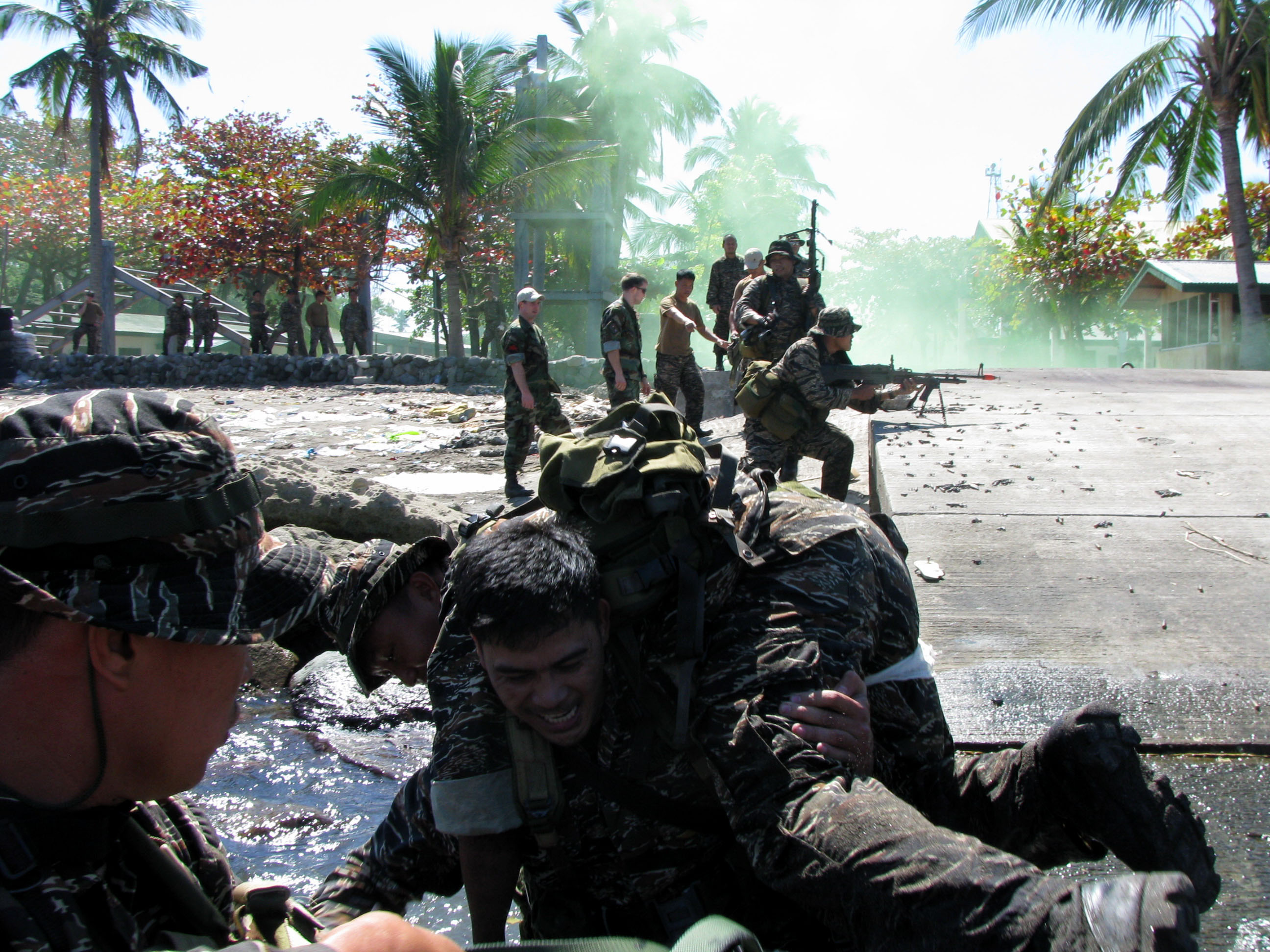
- A member of the Armed Forces of the Philippines Naval Special Operations Group participates in a battlefield exercise during a combat medic subject matter expert exchange at Naval Base Cavite, Philippines.

Site information
- Type: Naval base
- Owner: Armed Forces of the Philippines
- Controlled by: Philippine Navy
- Open to the public: No
- Condition: Active

Location
- Location in the Philippines
- Coordinates: 14°28′54″N 120°54′58″E
- Area: 9 hectares (22 acres)

Site history
- Built: late 16th century
- Built by: Spanish East Indies
- In use: Spanish shipyard: late 16th century – early 19th century Spanish naval station: early 19th century – 1898; U.S. Naval facility: 1898–1971; Philippine Naval facility: 1971–present
- Battles/wars: Battle of Manila Bay
- Events: Cavite Mutiny of 1872

Garrison information
- Current commander: Cmdre. Romeo Santiago Nebres
- Garrison: Naval Sea Systems Command; Naval Logistics Center

Naval Station Pascual Ledesma, also known as Cavite Naval Base or Cavite Navy Yard, is a military installation of the Philippine Navy in Cavite City.

In the 1940s and 1950s, it was called Philippine Navy Operating Base. The 9-hectare (22-acre) naval base is located at the easternmost end of Cavite Point in the San Roque district (specifically Fort San Felipe) of the city. Via traffic lane, this naval establishment is next to the famous Samonte Park. It was the former extension of U.S. Naval Station Sangley Point (transferred to the Philippines in 1971) which is now Naval Station Heracleo Alano. In 2009, it was named after Cmdre. Pascual Ledesma (b. May 17, 1843 – d. June 6, 1917), a leader of the Philippine Revolution and the first Officer-In-Command of the Philippine Navy.

== History ==
=== Spanish period ===
The port town of Cavite Nuevo was established after the Spanish colonizers found that the deep waters around the tip of Cavite Point (Cavite la Punta) are suitable for large ships and established the Astillero de Rivera (Rivera Shipyard). Cavite City became the main seaport of Manila and the staging port for the Manila-Acapulco Galleon Trade. After the demise of the galleon trade, the shipyard became the Spanish Arsenal.

=== American period ===
When the sovereignty of the Philippines was ceded to the Americans after the Spanish–American War, the U.S. took over all the military stations left by the Spaniards including the Cavite Naval Yard. The Americans made several modifications and improvements, but also included the demolition of Fort Guadalupe and partially of Fort San Felipe.

It was the US Navy's only ship repair facility in the western Pacific before World War II. Sangley Point was a component of the navy yard. Sangley Point was a subordinate command of the Yard and where the naval radio transmitting facility and the naval hospital was located.

In 1941, the 16th Naval District was established in the navy yard during the American colonial period. At the beginning of World War II, the Cavite Navy Yard was destroyed by Japanese bombers. It was abandoned and the Japanese used the yard for small boat repair. It is the same place the Japanese forces used as a headquarters after they conquered Cavite during the Second World War.

In 1945, the yard was retaken by the combined Filipino and American forces and recommissioned, but it was turned over to the Philippine government in 1947 for the Philippine Navy.

=== After independence ===
Early in December 1970, it was officially announced that U.S. Naval Station Sangley Point would be closed. On July 1, 1971, Sangley Point changed status from active to inactive in preparation for the turnover of the facility to the government of the Philippines. On-the-job-training sessions were conducted for Philippine naval personnel to ensure the safe and proper operation of all base industrial facilities. On September 1, 1971, the base was officially turned over to the government of the Philippines, ending 73 years as a U.S. naval facility. It is currently used as a facility of the Philippine Navy and the Philippine Air Force. William J. Mitzel and his wife Barbara were the last US personnel to occupy quarters on the installation. Mr. Mitzel was responsible for the final turn over and lived on the installation with his wife, when the turn over was completed.

In line with Philippine Navy General Order number 229 dated July 7, 2009, the naval installations were renamed to honor esteemed predecessors in the military/naval service who fought for the protection of the nation's sovereignty, territorial integrity, democracy, and the maritime interests of the country. With this, the Naval Base Cavite, the naval station in Fort San Felipe, was assigned the name Naval Station Pascual Ledesma.

Naval Base Cavite provides support services to the Philippine Navy and other Armed Forces of the Philippines tenant units in the base complex, such as refueling, re-watering, shore power connections, berthing, ferry services, tugboat assistance, sludge disposal services and housing.

=== Naval Sea Systems Command ===
Formerly the Naval Support Command, the Naval Sea System Command operates the country's military shipyards providing repair and maintenance of all navy ships and aircraft and their weapons. They develop new technologies for the Navy and maintains their communications and electronic equipment in order to sustain the naval defense capability of the Philippine Navy. It is the biggest industrial complex of the Armed Forces of the Philippines.

The Philippine Navy's Naval Sea Systems Command shared a video on their realization to restart their naval shipbuilding capability with the reopening of the Naval Shipbuilding Center (previously called the Cavite Naval Yard) which was refurbished and retooled as part Israel Shipyard's contract to supply fast attack interdiction crafts to the Philippine Navy.

The new facility will be building/assembling some of the Acero-class FAICs (Shaldag Mk. V) that were procured by the DND under the FAICM Acquisition Project, and will likely to the same once additional orders are made.

Israel Shipyard turned over the upgraded shipyard to the Philippine Navy in 2023.

=== Naval Logistics Center ===
The Naval Logistics Center began as the OSP supply center under the finance branch of the Philippine Army for supporting the few vessels turned over by the US Navy. In October 1947, the supply center was elevated to a regular division and paved the way to the establishment of the general supply depot named as the Naval Supply Center in 1950. It was placed under control of the Commander, Naval Shore Establishment, later called the Fleet Support Command and the Naval Support Command in 1967.

It is now called the Naval Logistics Center. The depot procures and maintains, manages supplies and raw materials, operates equipment and facilities and render related services in support of the logistics requirement of Philippine Navy units.

=== Hospital ===
Located within the base is the Cavite Naval Hospital, a medical facility that provides hospital and out-patient services to Philippine Navy personnel and their dependents. It is located on P. Zamora Extension/Reynoso Road,(14°28′58.6″N 120°54′52.5″E) adjacent to the navy chapel. The other naval hospital, Manila Navy Hospital is located in Fort Bonifacio in Taguig City.

=== Education ===
Sangley Point National High School is located at Naval Station Heracleo Alano. It is situated along La Naval Rd, Naval Station Heracleo Alano, Sangley Point, San Antonio, Cavite City; not at Naval Base Pascual Ledesma regarding the above topic.

=== Chapel ===
Naval Base Cavite is served by the Stella Maris Chapel, a Roman Catholic military chaplaincy located on P. Zamora Ext. (or Reynoso Rd)(14°28′59.3″N 120°54′50.4″E) inside the base in Fort San Felipe, Cavite City.

== See also ==
- US Naval Base Philippines
- Naval Base Manila
- Naval Station Leovigildo Gantioqui (Naval Station San Miguel)
- Danilo Atienza Air Base, the former US Naval Station Sangley Point located across Cañacao Bay
- Fort San Felipe (Cavite)
- United States Navy submarine bases
- World War II United States Merchant Navy
