= Balesin Island =

Island in Polillo, Quezon, Philippines

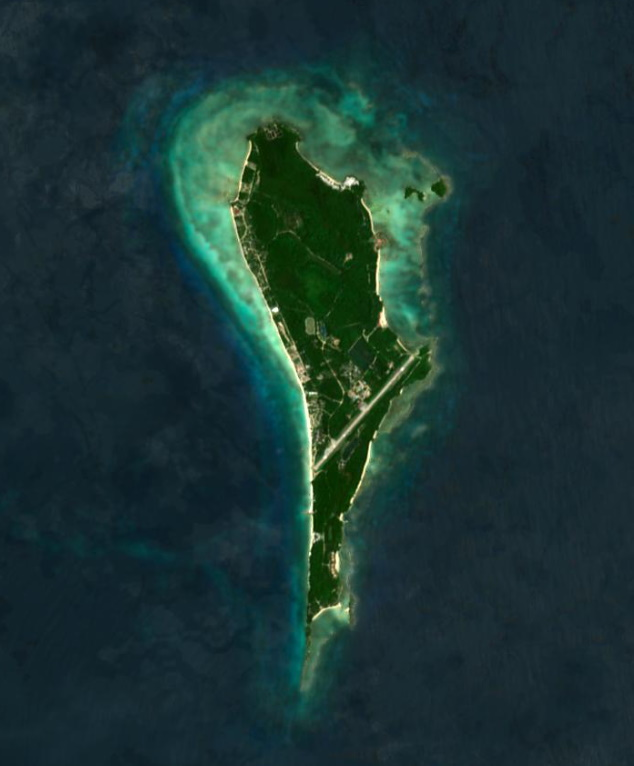

- Location within Luzon Location within Philippines

Geography
- Coordinates: 14°25′27″N 122°02′14″E
- Area: 4.24 km^{2} (1.64 sq mi)
- Highest elevation: 8.74 m (28.67 ft)

Administration
- Philippines
- Region: Calabarzon
- Province: Quezon
- Municipality: Polillo
- Barangay: Balesin

Demographics
- Population: 1,207 (2020)

Additional information

Balesin Island is a private tropical island and barangay off the eastern coast of Luzon in the Philippines. It is administered as part of the municipality of Polillo of Quezon province.

== Geography ==
Balesin Island is situated within Lamon Bay and has a land area of 4.24 square kilometers (1.64 sq mi).

=== Climate ===
The weather of Balesin Island is dominated by the trade winds, creating two seasons. The amihan (northeast monsoon) brings moderate temperatures, little or no rainfall, and a prevailing wind from the east. Typically it begins in November or December and ends sometime in May or June. Throughout rest of the year, Balesin Island experiences the habagat (southwest monsoon) season, characterized by hot and humid weather, frequent heavy rainfall, and a prevailing wind from the west. The island is periodically subject to severe tropical storms.

== History ==
During the Japanese occupation of the Philippines, a contingent of seven soldiers lived on Balesin Island, reportedly existing peacefully with indigenous local fishermen and their families.

Balesin Island was once owned by businessman Baby Ysmael. The island was later acquired from Ysmael by Edgardo “Ed” Tordesillas, who began to develop it with basic facilities for tourism. Early customers were predominantly Japanese. Today, Balesin Island is a property of Alphaland Corporation, a private company majority owned by its Chairman Roberto Ongpin, a prominent Filipino businessman.

== Balesin Island Club ==
Around 10% of the island has been developed to create a luxury resort, Balesin Island Club, with membership fees reportedly in the range ₱2.4-4 million.

The resort was master-planned to optimise ecological sustainability. Runoff from the 1.527-kilometer-long (5,010 ft) runway of Balesin Airport provides over 100 million liters (26 million U.S. gallons) of water annually which passes through several man-made lakes and filtration to provide potable water. In addition used water is recycled for landscaping during the summer. The island's coral reefs are managed for diving and sustainable fishing with local species including parrotfish, butterfly fish, yellowfin tuna, mahi-mahi, grouper, and deep-sea crabs.

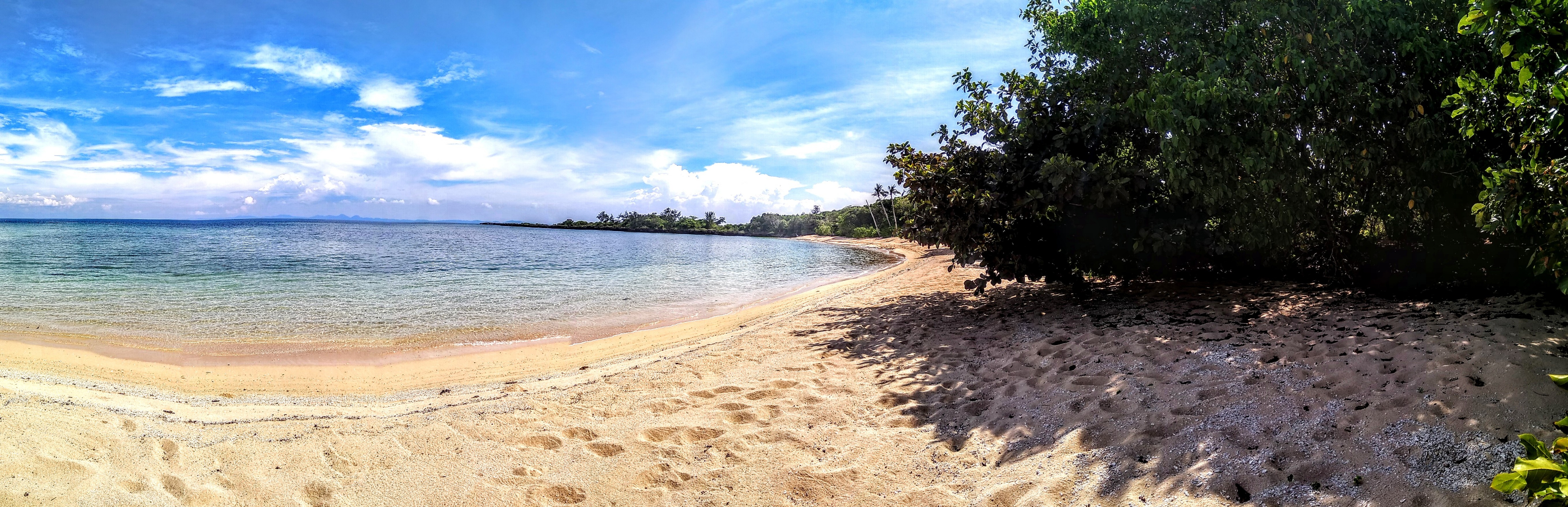
Beach at Phuket Village, Balesin Island Club

== Transportation ==
The island is served by the E. L. Tordesillas Airport, also known as Balesin Airport which has a 1.5 km (0.93 mi) runway. Balesin is served by buses, jeeps, electric golf carts, and service vans around the island.

== See also ==
- Polillo Islands
