= Balesin-e Sharifabad =

Balesin-e Sharifabad بالسين شريف اباد
- Village
- Location within Iran
- Coordinates: 37°39′00″N 47°17′00″E
- Country: Iran
- Province: East Azerbaijan
- County: Meyaneh
- Bakhsh: Torkamanchay
- Rural District: Barvanan-e Gharbi

Population (2006)
  - Total: 207
- Time zone: UTC+3:30 (IRST)
  - Summer (DST): UTC+4:30 (IRDT)

Balesin-e Sharifabad (Persian: بالسين شريف اباد, also Romanized as Bālesīn-e Sharīfābād) is a village in Barvanan-e Gharbi Rural District, Torkamanchay District, Meyaneh County, East Azerbaijan Province, Iran. At the 2006 census, its population was 207, in 57 families.
