= Danilo Atienza Air Base =

Military base in Cavite, Philippines

Major Danilo Atienza Air Base Baseng Panghimpapawid "Comandante Danilo Atienza"
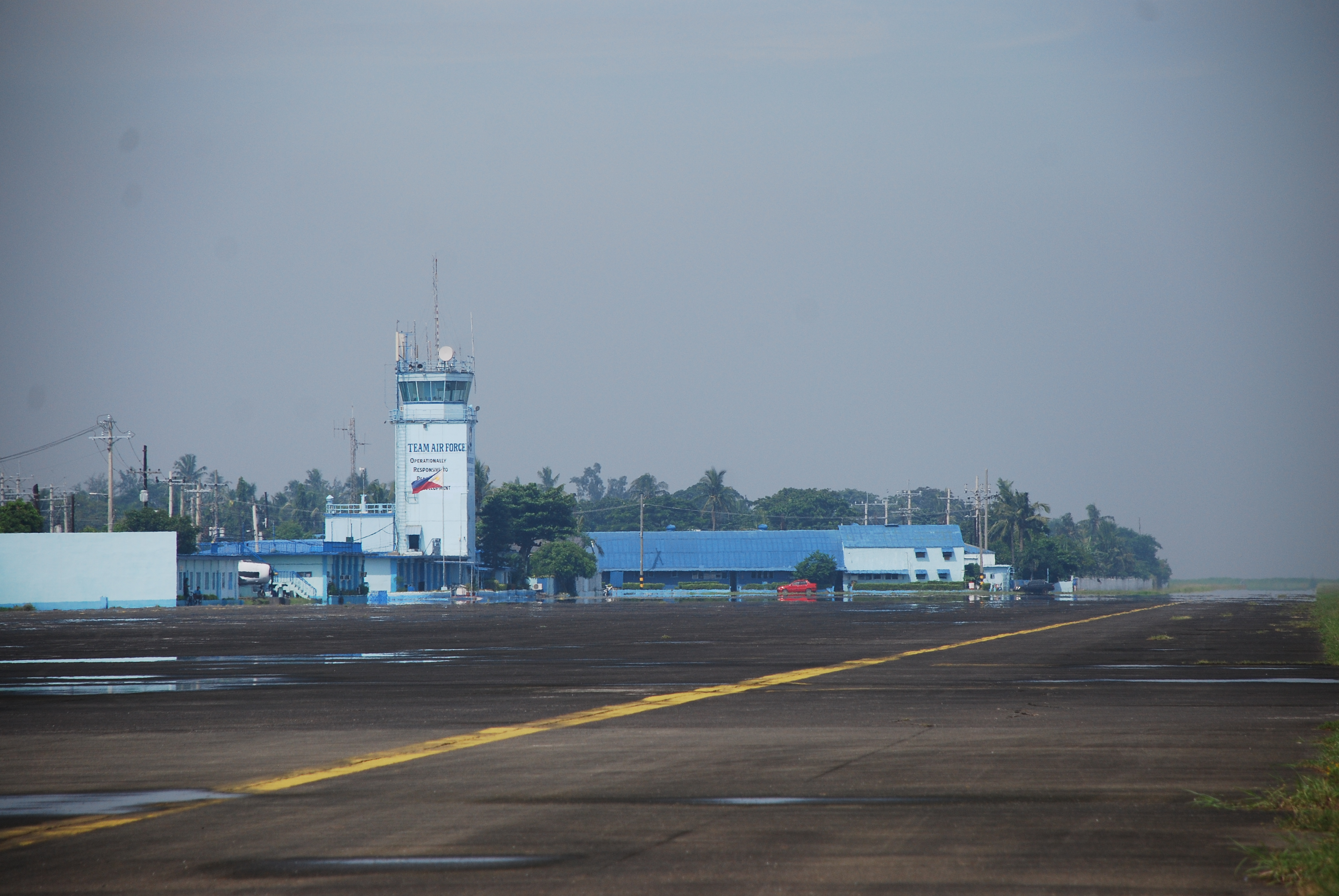
- Control tower at the Danilo Atienza Air Base
- IATA: SGL; ICAO: RPLS

Summary
- Airport type: Military: Air Force Base
- Operator: Philippine Air Force
- Location: Sangley Point, Cavite City, Cavite, Philippines
- Built: March 20, 1945; 81 years ago
- In use: 1945–1971 (United States); 1971–present (Philippines)
- Occupants: 15th Strike Wing; 451st Supply Squadron; 570th Composite Tactical Wing; 1308th Dental Dispensary; MF-30 Squadrons; MF-40 Squadrons
- Elevation AMSL: 8 ft (2.4 m)
- Coordinates: 14°29′43.5″N 120°54′41.0″E

Map
- Location within Luzon Location within Philippines

Runways
Direction	Length		Surface
Direction	ft	m	Surface
07/25	7,769	2,367	Asphalt

Danilo Atienza Air Base (IATA: SGL, ICAO: RPLS) is a military base used by the Philippine Air Force, located on the northern end of the Cavite Peninsula in Manila Bay, Luzon Island, Philippines. It is adjacent to Cavite City, in Cavite Province.

== History ==
On September 1, 1971, the U.S. Naval Station Sangley Point base was turned over to the Philippine Navy and Air Force, with the facility being renamed Sangley Point Air Base. The two services jointly operated the facility.

=== 1989 coup ===
During the December 1989 coup attempt, the base was seized by rebellious military personnel. During the brief period of combat between loyalist and revolutionary elements of the military, a squadron of four F-5A's led by Major Danilo Atienza repeatedly bombed and strafed Sangley Point Air Base, destroying several T-28 combat planes belonging to the coup forces. Unfortunately, Major Atienza's plane crashed during the otherwise successful operation, and he was killed. After the coup was put down, Sangley Point Air Base was renamed as the Major Danilo Atienza Air Base in 1992.

=== Present day ===
As of 2009 the base is home to the Philippine Air Force's 15th Strike Wing, 451st Supply Squadron, 570th Composite Tactical Wing, and 1308th Dental Dispensary. It was also home to the Philippine Navy's MF-30 and MF-40 Squadrons and Naval Air School Center (NATS-50).

== Future development ==
=== New Manila airport ===
Danilo Atienza Air Base is among the proposed sites for the new Manila airport to replace or complement Ninoy Aquino International Airport.

In 2013, the All-Asia Resources and Reclamation Corporation (ARRC) — a venture headed by tycoon Henry Sy — commissioned Danish construction firm Rambøll Group A.S. to conduct a feasibility study for the reclamation of 50 hectares off Sangley Point and the development of an airport with two runways and a terminal capable of handling 50 million passengers annually in place of the current air base. This was part of the so-called "Philippines Global Gateway" project proposed by the ARRC to the Philippine government in February 2016. The entire ARRC project involves the construction of an airport and seaport facility, as well as an industrial complex (ecozone), on land reclaimed from Manila Bay off Sangley Point; it is estimated to cost US$50 billion, involving among other things the reclamation of a total of 2,500 hectares of land and the construction of either an underwater tunnel to the SM Mall of Asia complex in Pasay or an extension of the Manila–Cavite Expressway to connect the project to Metro Manila.

In December 2016, the ARRC also proposed to the Duterte administration a plan to develop the existing Danilo Atienza Air Base and its 2.4 km long runway into a facility for low-cost carriers and general aviation "while waiting for the new airport." This proposal involves the construction of a ₱3.3-billion airport terminal. The air base's proposed conversion into a civil airport, if realized under this plan, is expected to reduce air traffic movements at Ninoy Aquino International Airport by 20%.

== Gallery ==
Danilo Atienza Air Base
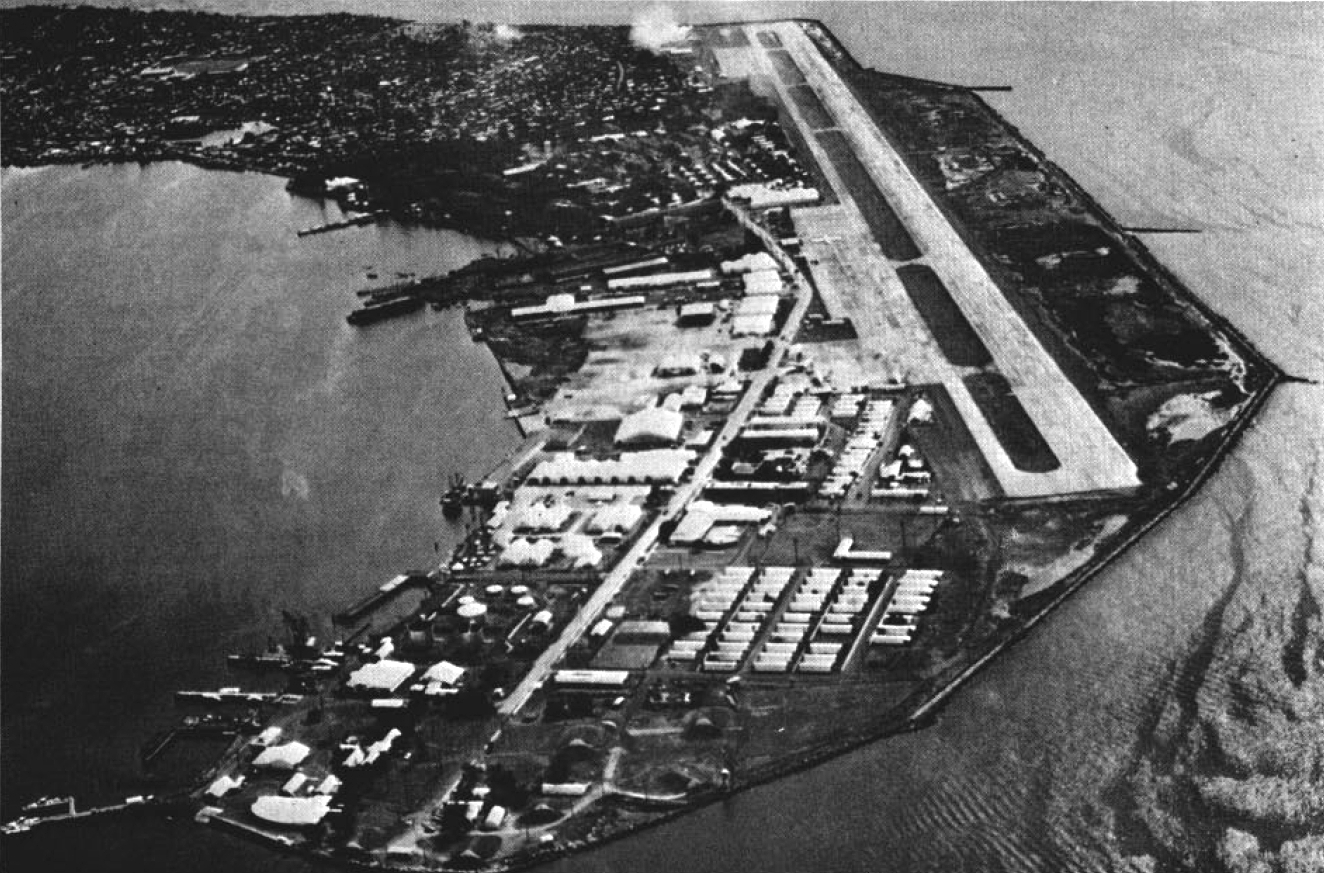
Aerial view of Sangley Point and Cavite City (c. 1964)
on Cavite Peninsula in Manila Bay

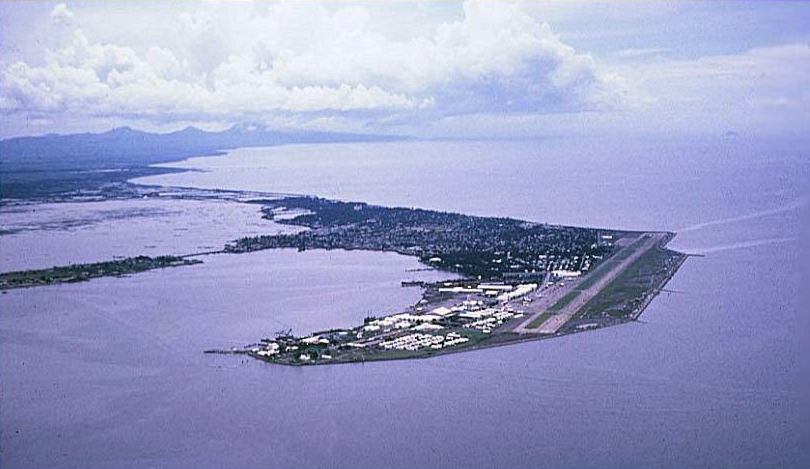
Aerial view of base and Cavite City (c. 1964)
on Cavite Peninsula in Manila Bay.

== See also ==
- U.S. Naval Station Sangley Point — for additional information and history.
- Naval Base Cavite — site of historic Spanish port, also on peninsula.
