= Swiss challenge (procurement) =

Form of public procurement

A Swiss challenge is a form of public procurement operated in some jurisdictions, which requires a public authority (usually an agency of government) that has received an unsolicited bid for a public project (such as a port, road or railway), or for services to be provided to government, to publish the bid and invite third parties to match or better it.

Some Swiss challenges also allow the entity that submitted the unsolicited bid itself then to match or better the best bid that comes out of the Swiss challenge process. Indian journalist Vinayak Chatterjee describes it as "one of the lesser known and even lesser-used methods of public procurement for core and social infrastructure projects".

== Swiss challenge system ==
A Swiss challenge system is a bidding process designed to elicit private sector initiative in core sector projects. It's an offer made by the original proponent to the government ensuring his process to be best (in terms of effectiveness including both the factors cost and time) by his initiative as a result of his own innovative approach or on the demand of the government to perform certain task. The Swiss challenge system, like the bonus system, further allows third parties to make better offers (challenges) for a project during a designated period with simple objective to discourage frivolous projects, or to avoid exaggerated project development costs. Then accordingly, the original proponent gets the right to counter-match any superior offers given by the third party.

== System ==
There are two different patterns that the commissioning entity may adopt:

1. The government may purchase the intellectual property rights for a project concept from the proponent or then award the project through a competitive bidding process in which no bidder has a predefined advantage.
2. The government can offer the original proponent an advantage in a competitive bidding process. In this case the government should create rewards that satisfy the original proponent while still allowing a truly competitive process.

However, it has been observed that in both bonus and Swiss challenge systems it is not easy to find the right balance between incentives to propose beneficial projects and incentives for third parties to submit counter proposals. In South Korea and the Philippines, however, very few projects have been successfully challenged. In Chile the probability of a successful challenge appears to be high, though experience is limited. In an effort to find the right balance, some countries (such as Argentina) have begun to explore hybrid systems combining elements of the bonus system and the Swiss challenge system. However, in some countries the proposer does have certain advantages. Unlike, the lowest bidder will not be given the work order for the project. Instead, the participant who floats the design and concept for the project will have the first right of refusal.

There are various attributes that governments may take into account while dealing with the Swiss challenge system, including:

1. Offering cost reimbursement
Some countries such as Chile and South Africa allow reimbursement of original project proponents for their project concept or project development costs. The advantage given to the original proponent in the bidding is usually intended to compensate for use of the project concept. In addition, the bidding documents sometimes specify reimbursement for project development costs by the winning bidder or the government. Other countries (such as Korea and the Philippines) allow no reimbursement of project development costs. Offering cost reimbursement maintains private sector interest during the development phase of an infrastructure project, helps to ensure that the source of ideas is not limited to large investors with deep pockets, and encourages proponents to allocate the resources needed to ensure that projects are professionally developed.

2. Setting time limits
Government often sets time limits on the approval and bidding phases. Time constraints on counter proposals give an obvious competitive advantage to the original project proponent. The proponent has already spent much time and effort preparing the project and thus is much more familiar with its characteristics. By contrast, a challenger may have as little as 60 days in some countries (such as the Philippines) to prepare a counterproposal. Many potential challengers may be unwilling to compete without sufficient time to prepare.

== Adoption ==
The Swiss Challenge system is utilised in Bangladesh to procure infrastructure development through public-private partnerships. The technique was used for the development of Mega Film City Venture by the Jaipur Development Authority (JDA). The JDA - a Rajasthani public authority - is planning to fund the venture using the Swiss Challenge philosophy. In 2017, Indian Railways also adopted Swiss challenge for inviting tenders for renovation of its 23 railway stations.

The Philippine government adopted the Swiss challenge system in 1990 through the passing of Republic Act 6957, also known as the Build-Operate-Transfer Law. Since then, a number of Swiss Challenges have been proposed, the most recent being the revitalization of the Panay Railways system.

== Problems ==
The questions relating to legal validity of using the Swiss challenge system when a counterproposal contains different specifications than the original proposal was always being raised. The problem was being observed at the time of construction of International Passenger Terminal 3 in Manila's Manila International Airport, where several issues relating to validity of system were being raised. The challenger was eventually awarded the concession. Concerns are also raised that unsolicited proposals (or the Swiss Challenge) may be actively discouraged as they bring information asymmetries in the procurement process and result in lack of transparency and in the fair and equal treatment of potential bidders.
