= Naval Station Sangley Point =

Former US naval base located in Cavite, Philippines

Coordinates: 14°29′28.74″N 120°53′37.99″E

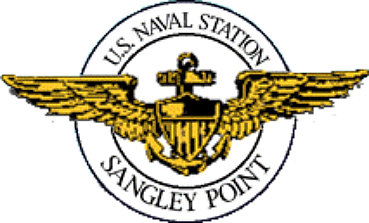
U.S. Naval Station Sangley Point
- Cavite City, Cavite Philippines

Site information
- Type: Military base
- Controlled by: United States Navy

Site history
- Built: 1898
- In use: 1898 – 1971 (U.S. Naval Facility)

Airfield information
- IATA: NSP; ICAO: RPLS

Summary
- Elevation AMSL: 8 ft (2.4 m)
- Interactive map of Airfield information

Runways
Direction	Length		Surface
Direction	ft	m	Surface
07/25	7,769	2,367	Asphalt

Naval Station Sangley Point was a communication and hospital facility of the United States Navy which occupied the northern portion of the Cavite City peninsula and is surrounded by Manila Bay, approximately eight miles southwest of Manila, the Philippines. The station was a part of the Cavite Navy Yard across the peninsula. The naval station had a runway that was built after World War II, which was used by U.S. Navy Lockheed P-2 Neptune, Lockheed P-3 Orion, and Martin P4M Mercator maritime patrol and anti-submarine warfare aircraft. An adjacent seaplane runway, ramp area and seaplane tender berths also supported Martin P5M Marlin maritime patrol aircraft until that type's retirement from active naval service in the late 1960s. NAS Sangley Point/NAVSTA Sangley Point was also used extensively during the Vietnam War, primarily for U.S. Navy patrol squadrons forward deployed from the United States on six-month rotations. The naval station was turned over to the Philippine government in 1971. It is now operated by the Philippine Air Force and Philippine Navy.

== Spanish period ==
The Spanish colonial government in the Philippines, which had ruled the Philippines since 1571, found a useful purpose for the tiny peninsula across the bay. Ever distrustful of the Chinese merchants who called on every port from Japan to the Arabian Peninsula, the Spanish passed laws restricting their entry into the capital city of Manila. These Chinese merchants, then known as sangleys, could, however, sell their wares across the bay from the city on the narrow strip of land that would eventually bear their name. In addition to their role as international traders, Chinese artisans and craftsmen were employed as inexpensive labor by the Spanish shipbuilders who built ships at Sangley that were used in the galleon trade route between Manila and Acapulco.

In 1871 the Spanish established a naval hospital, managed by the Sisters of Charity, at Cañacao near the western end of the peninsula. In addition, as the age of sail began to wane and the age of steam was ushered in, the eastern end of Sangley Point became a coaling station and support facility for the Spanish naval base located just across Cañacao Bay at the Cavite naval yard.

== American period ==
=== Battle of Manila Bay ===
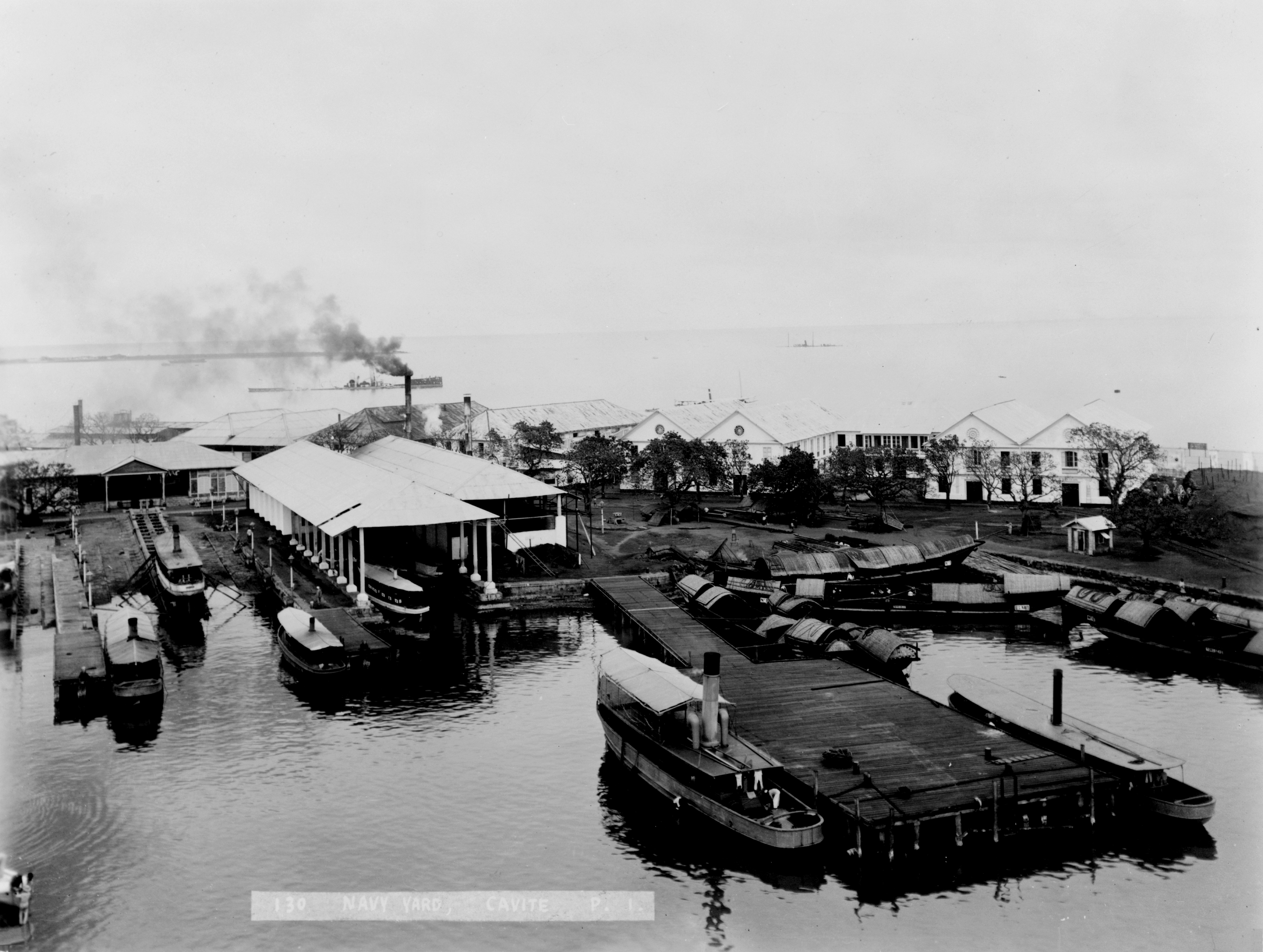
Cavite Navy Yard in 1899.

In 1898, diplomatic relations between the United States and Spain were strained by events related to the insurrection taking place on the Spanish island of Cuba.

In anticipation of hostilities with Spain, then Assistant Secretary of the Navy Theodore Roosevelt ordered the U.S. Asiatic Fleet, under the command of Commodore George Dewey aboard USS Olympia, to proceed to the British Crown Colony of Hong Kong. There he was to make preparations to move on the Spanish Fleet in the Philippines, believed to be anchored at Subic Bay. After war with Spain had broken out following the explosion of USS Maine in Havana, Cuba, Dewey proceeded to the Philippines and arrived at Subic Bay just before sunset on 30 April 1898. However, Spanish naval authorities had determined that their position there was undefendable and had moved the fleet to Manila Bay.

Under cover of darkness, Dewey proceeded to Manila Bay, arriving just off Corregidor after 11 pm. The ships stealthily moved past the south side of the island fortress, through Boca Grande, and into Manila Bay.

Shortly after midnight they had nearly passed unnoticed when soot in USS McCulloch's smokestack caught fire, revealing the squadron's position. Spanish batteries on the south shore near Punta Restinga and on El Fraile Island opened fire on the shadowy ships. A few rounds were fired in response by USS Raleigh. One shell scored a direct hit on El Fraile battery. The Spanish guns then fell silent after firing only three rounds. However, the big guns on Corregidor remained silent. Although concerned that his presence had been revealed, Dewey proceeded slowly eastward toward Manila.

Dawn was beginning to break on the morning of 1 May as the squadron arrived at Manila. At first, however, lookouts posted high on the American ships could not locate the enemy fleet. Then, off to the right, they spotted a number of white buildings on the narrow strip of land known as Sangley Point, and beyond them a line of dark gray objects on the water. A hard turn to starboard brought the American squadron to bear on the Spanish fleet. The Spanish ships were anchored in an arch stretching eastward and southward from the mouth of Cañacao Bay near the tip of Sangley Point. As they approached, the column of American ships, with Olympia at the head of the line followed by Baltimore, Raleigh, Petrel, Concord, and Boston, gradually turned to starboard, bringing their port guns to bear on the Spanish fleet. Dewey turned to Captain Charles V. Gridley, commanding officer of Olympia, and said, "You may fire when ready, Gridley." At 5:41 am, the squadron opened fire. The Battle of Manila Bay had begun.

The firing became incessant, the white smoke of gunfire becoming so thick that it was difficult to gauge accurately or effectively. Although trapped in the narrow confines of Cañacao Bay, the Spanish fleet managed to maintain a heavy barrage of return fire.

However, most of the Spanish gunfire fell short of its mark. After making five passes in front of the enemy fleet, Dewey withdrew at 7:35 am to investigate reports that he was low on ammunition. He passed the word that the men should take advantage of the break to eat breakfast. One gunner, eager to return to action, yelled out, "For God's sake, Captain. Don't let us stop now! To hell with breakfast!"

Just after 11:00 am, after determining that the report of low ammunition was in error and that his ships had suffered little or no battle damage, Dewey re-engaged the enemy. However, this time he met very little resistance. As the smoke cleared, the devastation inflicted by American guns became clearly evident. With the exception of a few gunboats, the Spanish fleet had been totally annihilated. More than 300 Spanish sailors had been killed or wounded. The lone American casualty was due to heatstroke. By 12:30 pm, the Spanish colors over the arsenal at Sangley Point were replaced by a white flag. The Battle of Manila Bay was over.

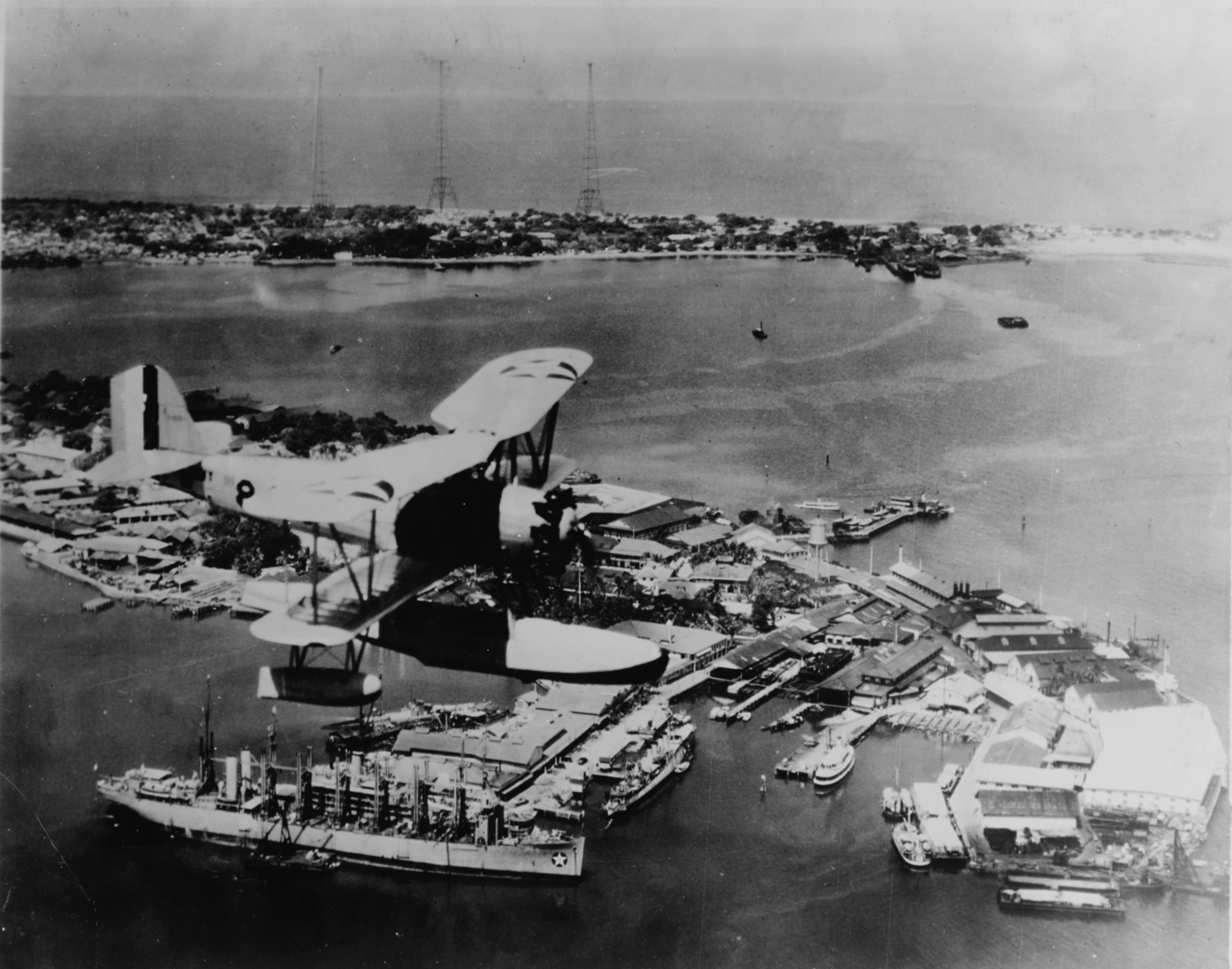
An O2U floatplane flies over the Cavite Navy Yard, circa 1930. The seaplane tender Jason is docked at the yard, directly below the plane. Sangley Point is in the background.

The following day, the naval facilities at Cavite and Sangley Point were officially taken over by U.S. Naval Expeditionary Forces under the command of Commodore George Dewey.

Sangley continued to serve essentially the same function for the U.S. Navy as it had for the Spanish navy. The coaling facilities on the eastern end continued to supply the Navy with coal until ships converted to oil. At that time a tank farm was established as was an airfield and seaplane base.

The Cañacao Naval Hospital Reservation was established on the western end. The US Navy continued to operate the hospital started by the Spanish. In the mid-1920s a modern new hospital was built as part of a major construction project to modernize the facility. The new hospital continued to serve the Navy and the local population until early 1942. It was destroyed during World War II.

Three 600-foot (180 m) steel antenna towers were erected in 1915 for the operation of a powerful radio communications station, named Radio Sangley. Later on, a submarine support facility was established. The Cavite Navy Yard was made the headquarters for the U.S. Navy Asiatic Fleet. Just across Cañacao Bay, became the major ship repair facility for the Asiatic fleet. However, World War II and the Japanese occupation of the Philippines interrupted operations in 1942.

=== World War II ===
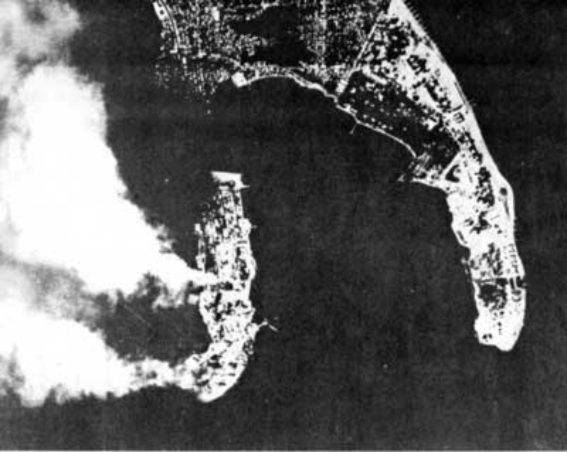
A Japanese air raid on 10 December 1941 leaves the Cavite Navy Yard in flames.

The first bombing by the Japanese on 10 December 1941, heavily damaged the Cavite Navy Yard. Japanese forces occupied Cavite in January 1942. the Japanese continued to use Sangley and Cavite for basically the same purpose. They rehabilitated and expanded the facilities and used them for the repair of their own craft and the construction of small wooden vessels for coastal shipping of supplies. American carrier-based planes first bombed the repair facility in September 1944. The Cavite Navy Yard was again badly damaged, as were most of the hospital buildings at Cañacao.

On 20 March 1945, units of the Seventh Fleet landed on Sangley Point, ridding the area of the remaining Japanese. Within a month, ACORN-45 arrived and set up an advanced base maintenance organization under Commander Donald W. Darby. Seabees from the 12th Naval Construction Regiment immediately began construction and repair of the base and airfield.

=== Postwar years ===
The base maintenance organization was officially designated Naval Air Base, Sangley Point in 1945. Early in 1955, top echelon planners of the Navy recognized the importance of Sangley Point services and designated it a permanent facility. Later, after the establishment of Naval Air Station Cubi Point at Subic Bay, the designation was changed to Naval Station Sangley Point in accordance with the treaty with the Philippine government which allowed for only one official naval air station.

The Naval Station Sangley Point was not large, encompassing an area of only 341 acres (1.38 km^{2}). Half of which was occupied by its most valuable asset: the 8,000-foot (2,400 m) runway and its associated air-operations facilities and air-navigational aids. The primary mission of Sangley was to provide maintenance, support, and materials for the regional operations of U.S. Seventh Fleet.

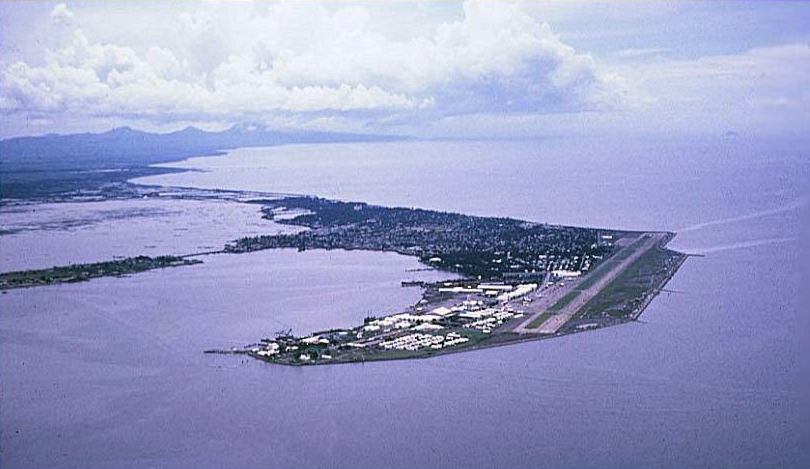
Sangley Point in the mid-1960s.

The base was the headquarters of Commander U.S. Naval Forces Philippines/Commander-in-Chief Pacific Representative Philippines (COMNAVPHIL/CINCPACREPPHIL), which was considered to be the most important activity supported by Naval Station Sangley Point.

It also supported two patrol squadrons of sea planes, deployed on Sangley on a rotational basis to help fulfill the Mutual Defense Treaty with the Philippines. During the Korean War, these were activated Naval Reserve Squadrons.

The Coast Guard Air Station and the Coast Guard Ship Nettle played a vital role in search-and-rescue operations and in the maintenance of remote long-range aid-to navigation (LORAN) stations located throughout the Philippines. The Fleet Weather Facility was tasked with furnishing weather information to ships and aircraft operating in the Western Pacific and East China Sea areas.

Naval Station Sangley Point also provided support for a Fleet Air Wing detachment, a Naval Communications Center, Marine Barracks, a Recruiting Detachment, and Navy Exchange and Commissary Stores.

=== John Paul Jones School ===
In 1945, upon the return of the Americans and in anticipation of the possible allied invasion of the Japanese mainland, an 8,000-foot (2,400 m) runway was constructed, along with the associated air operations and maintenance facilities. The invasion never took place, but Sangley's importance as a support facility for the Seventh Fleet continued to grow. So did its complement of Navy, Marine, Coast Guard, and civilian personnel.

As the number of military personnel at Sangley grew, so did the need to provide accommodations and facilities for the dependents that would ultimately accompany them. Not the least of these facilities, of course, would be a school. With this in mind, a group of Quonset huts was designated, and in August 1948 the first dependent school was opened at Sangley Point.

The school comprised Grades 1–6 with only 65 students. As the number of dependents increased, the school began to grow, eventually adding a kindergarten and the eighth, ninth, and tenth grades. Ultimately, in 1963, the Department of the Navy added 11th and 12th grades.

The school comprised a series of quonset huts linked together with a central corridor. The original buildings were constructed on concrete piers with wooden floors, but the newer ones on the eastern end were built on concrete slabs. All the buildings, however, were metal Quonset huts. The entire school grounds were enclosed by a fence made primarily of chain link. There were numerous mango trees in the school yard.

As the school grew, it remained nameless for more than ten years until 1958, when a contest was held among the students to name their own school. The prize of a U.S. Savings Bond went to Jackie Newell and Craig Wilcox ('56–'59) for choosing a name which commemorated the American naval hero of the Revolutionary War, John Paul Jones (JPJ).

In 1967, JPJ came under the supervision of the United States Air Force and was incorporated into the District II, Pacific Area, Department of Defense Dependent Schools. In March 1968, it was accredited by the North Central Association of Colleges and Secondary Schools. By now, there were 650 students at JPJ from kindergarten to the 12th grade; ten times the number that was first enrolled in 1948. By 1970, that number would swell to 690. Plans were in the works for the construction of a new school when official word came on 10 December 1970, that Naval Station Sangley Point was to terminate operations as a U.S. facility.

On 30 June 1971, after almost 23 years of service, John Paul Jones School was officially closed. The very next day, Naval Station Sangley Point changed its status from active to inactive. This school was changed into Sangley Elementary School.

== Closure ==
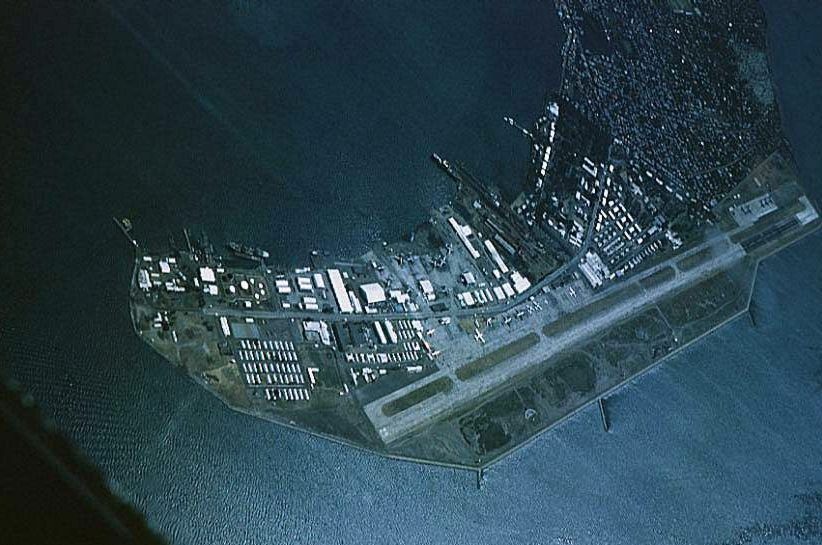
Overhead view of the Sangley Point facilities in the 1960s.

Early in December 1970, it was officially announced that U.S. Naval Station Sangley Point would be closed. On 1 July 1971, Sangley Point changed its status from active to inactive in preparation for the turnover of the facility to the government of the Philippines. The Sangley Point Closure Detail was activated under the command of an Officer-In-Charge, CAPT Waldo Atkins, with a 95-man, 7-officer contingent.

In the extremely compressed 60-day period of deactivation, in excess of 350 items of automotive and construction equipment were transferred; more than 400 industrial buildings and government quarters were stripped of furnishings; installed equipment was disconnected and readied for shipment, and all buildings were secured.

A total of 2,500 tons and 1,500,000 cubic feet (42,000 m^{3}) of material assets were identified, packed and shipped by sea and land to various other U.S. military bases. Much of this transfer was accomplished at night and on weekends due to severely restricted barge and trucking schedules.

Approximately 300,000 pounds of materials and supplies were prepared for turnover to the government of the Philippines, including 375 buildings, 77 structures and 60 utilities systems and improvements. In connection with the relocation of equipment and materials to other bases, 49 stilt housing units were relocated to Subic Bay by a detachment of Seabees. On-the-job-training sessions were conducted for Philippine naval personnel to ensure the safe and proper operation of all base industrial facilities.

On 1 September 1971, the base was officially turned over to the government of the Philippines, ending 73 years as a U.S. Naval facility. It is currently used as a facility of the Philippine Navy and the Philippine Air Force. William J. Mitzel and his wife Barbara were the last US personnel to occupy quarters on the installation. Mr. Mitzel was responsible for the final turn over and lived on the installation with his wife, when the turn over was completed.

== Sangley Point in present day ==
=== Danilo Atienza Air Base, Philippine Air Force ===
The air base was renamed Major Danilo Atienza Air Base in honor for Major Atienza's actions during the 1989 coup attempt in which he destroyed several T-28 Trojan belonging to the rebels. But he was killed when his F-5A Freedom Fighter crashed during his attacking maneuver.

The Department of Transportation had “no objection" to an offer building a P508-billion airport complex on reclaimed land in Sangley Point. The upcoming international airport was pursued as a joint venture between investors, including Chinese enterprises, and the Cavite LGU.

=== Sangley Point Airport ===
The then-Department of Transportation and Communications (now the Department of Transportation) had chosen Sangley Point in Cavite City as the location of a new international airport serving Manila in 2014.

In February 2018, the province of Cavite proposed a $9.3-billion airport project in Sangley Point. It would involve the reclamation of about 1,500 hectares of land, and would have its first runway opened by 2022 if construction started by 2019. This would support 25 million passengers per annum. A second runway would be finished by 2025 under its phase 2 to serve 75 million passengers a year. The second phase would cost $5.5 billion.

In February 2020, the Sangley Point Airport was opened for small commercial aircraft and started hosting regular domestic passenger and cargo flights.

== See also ==
- US Naval Base Philippines
- Naval Base Manila
- Military History of the Philippines
- Military History of the United States
- U.S. Naval Base Subic Bay
- Philippine Fleet
- 15th Strike Wing Philippine Air Force
- Naval Base Heracleo Alano (Naval Base Cavite)
- Sangley Point Airport
- Danilo Atienza Air Base
- US Bases in the Philippines
