= Plaridel, Bulacan =

Municipality in Bulacan, Philippines

Plaridel Quingua
- Municipality
- Municipality of Plaridel, Municipality of Quingua
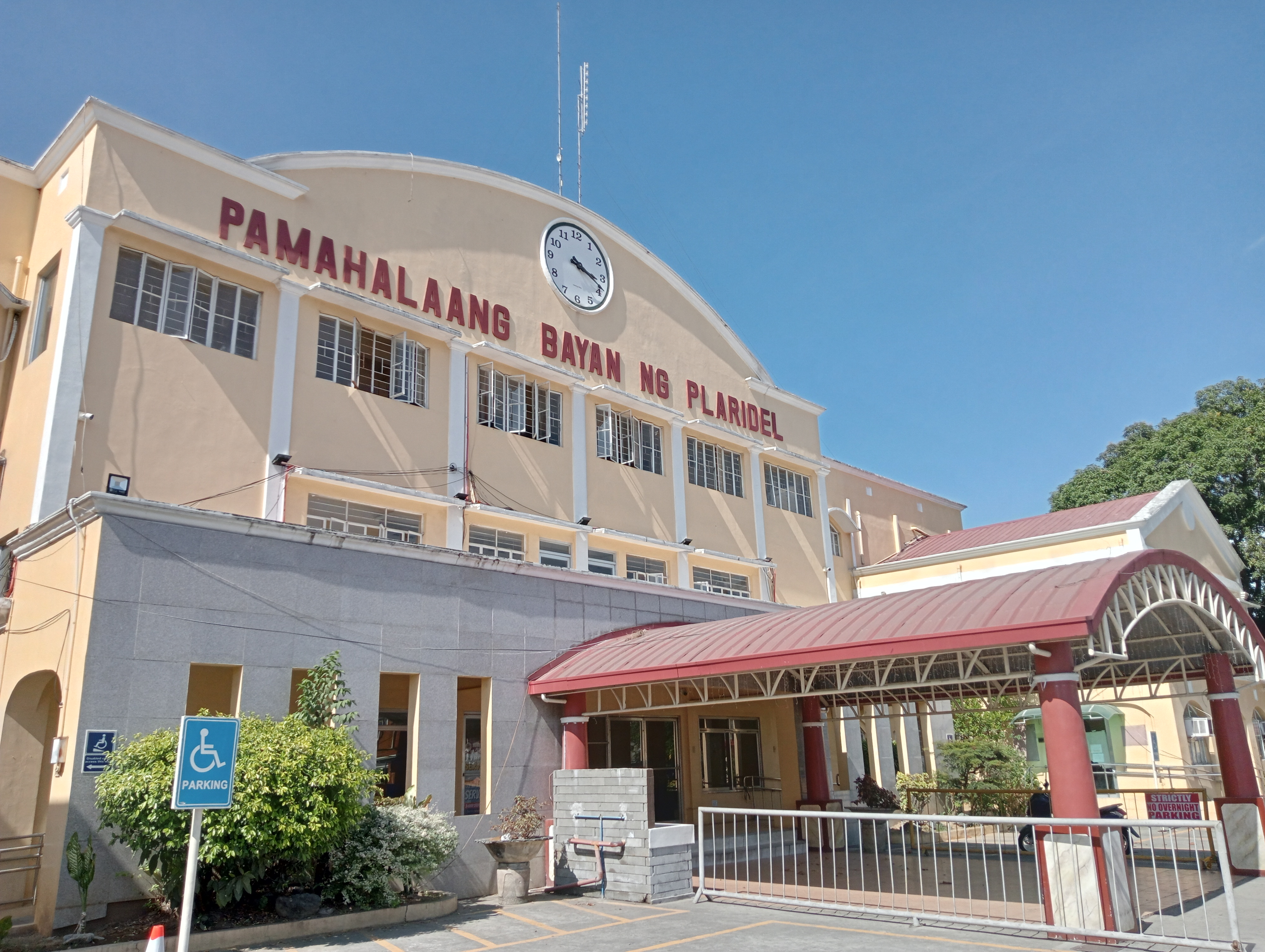
- Municipal Hall

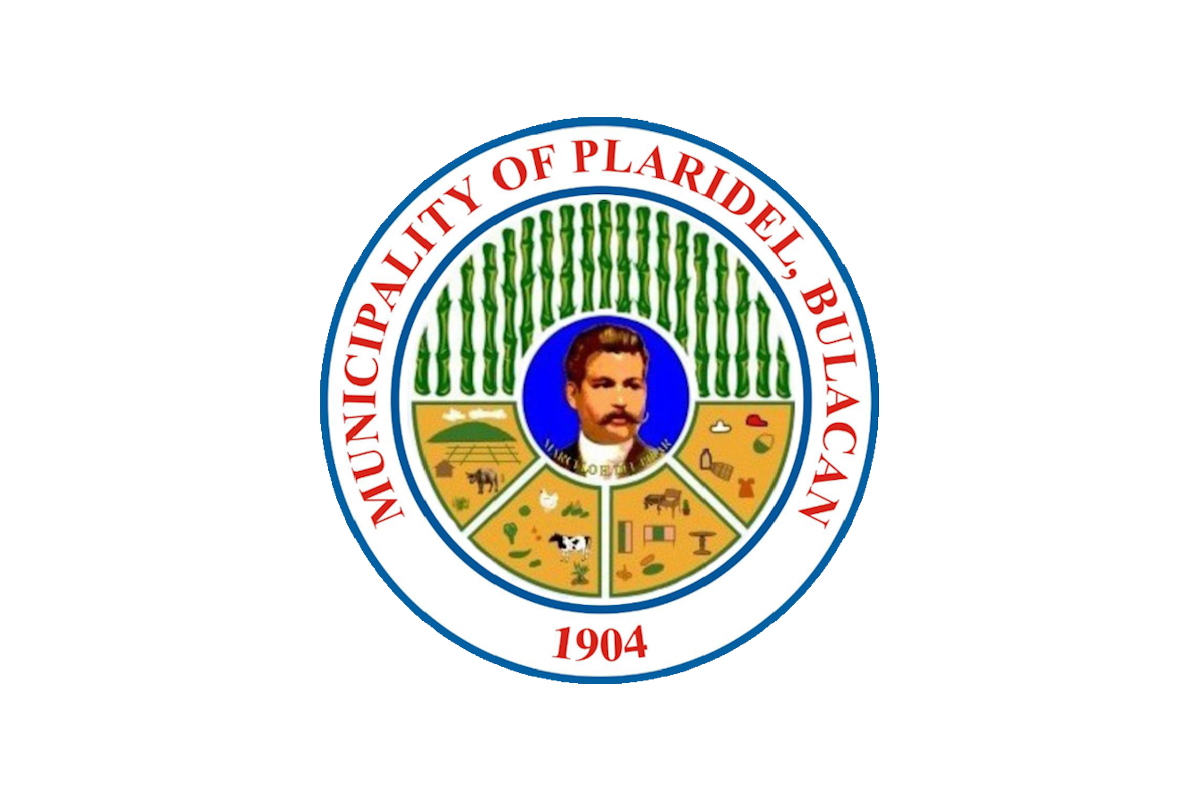
- Flag Seal
- Motto: Plaridel, dire-diretso sa Progreso (English: Plaridel, Straight to Progress)
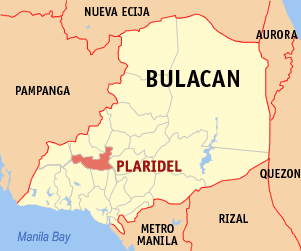
- Map of Bulacan with Plaridel highlighted
- Interactive map of Plaridel
- Location within the Philippines
- Coordinates: 14°53′13″N 120°51′25″E
- Country: Philippines
- Region: Central Luzon
- Province: Bulacan
- District: 2nd district
- Founded: September 27, 1602
- Named after: Pen name of Marcelo H. del Pilar
- Barangays: 19 (see Barangays)

Government
  - Type: Sangguniang Bayan
  - Mayor: Jocell Aimee R. Vistan
  - Vice Mayor: Mhel Gatdula De Leon
  - Representative: Augustina Dominique C. Pancho
  - Municipal Council: Members: Sheila Ann Enrina R. Enriquez; Reginald V. Javier; Ryan Christian S. Sagala; Allan Cris T. de Leon; Maria Isabel V. Liwanag; Raul V. Gatuz; Raymund H. Lopez; Alipio M. Marcelo
  - Electorate: 70,843 voters (2025)

Area
  - Total: 32.44 km^{2} (12.53 sq mi)
- Elevation: 11 m (36 ft)
- Highest elevation: 42 m (138 ft)
- Lowest elevation: 2 m (6.6 ft)

Population (2024 census)
  - Total: 120,939
  - Density: 3,728/km^{2} (9,656/sq mi)
  - Households: 29,013

Economy
  - Income class: 1st municipal income class
  - Poverty incidence: 11.9% (2021)
  - Revenue: ₱ 615 million (2024)
  - Assets: ₱ 2,053 million (2024)
  - Expenditure: ₱ 321.5 million (2024)
  - Liabilities: ₱ 540 million (2024)

Utilities
  - Electricity: Meralco
- Time zone: UTC+8 (PST)
- ZIP code: 3004
- PSGC: 0301417000
- IDD : area code: +63 (0)44
- Native languages: Tagalog; Kapampangan
- Website: www.plaridel.gov.ph

Plaridel, officially the Municipality of Plaridel (Tagalog: Bayan ng Plaridel, Kapampangan: Balen ning Plaridel), formerly known as Quingua, is a municipality in the province of Bulacan, Philippines. According to the 2024 census, it has a population of 120,939 people.

== Etymology ==
The name of the municipality during the Spanish and American colonial periods was Quingua. It is derived from the Kapampangan phrase "Quing wawa ding Tagalog" (meaning "at the river [mouth] of the Tagalogs"), which Spanish friars repeatedly heard from local natives when asking who deserved credit for a local construction work.

On December 29, 1936, the town's name was officially changed to Plaridel, after the pen name of Marcelo H. del Pilar, a prominent hero from Bulacan and a key figure in the Philippine Propaganda Movement during the Spanish colonial period.

== History ==
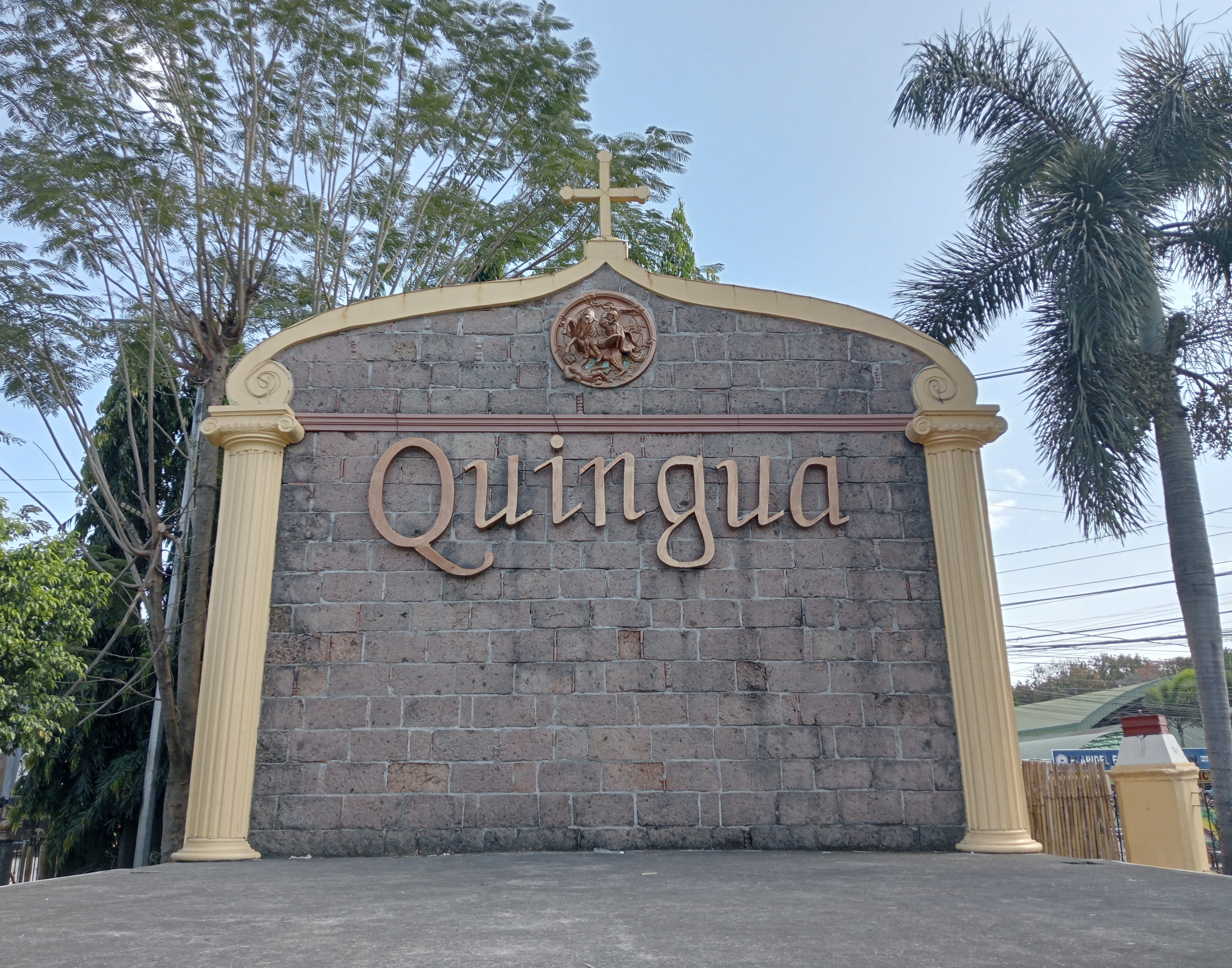
Quingua Marker

Plaridel's history can be traced through records back to 1581 in the early years of the Spanish colonization. The Augustinian friars from the Malolos Convent discovered a vast forest in 1581 then named as Binto; this would later be known as Quingua. As per the history of the Parish of St. James the Apostle (2001 issue) Quingua was established by the Augustinian Friars of Malolos who initially named it "Encomienda Binto" (Barangay Bintog got its name from this settlement). They built a visita (chapel of ease) and placed it under the jurisdiction of Fray Mateo Mendoza, the prior of Malolos.

The visita of Binto was elevated to an independent parish named Parroquia de Santiago Apostol, and the whole of Quingua was separated from Malolos and was created as a new pueblo on September 27, 1602.

Plaridel is crossed by the Angat River, also called Quingua River, which flows to Calumpit, Bulacan, and connects with the Pampanga River. Before, the town was also crossed by the Tabang River, a branch of the Angat River. The word "tabáng" means fresh water. This river used to pass through the town proper and split into two in the middle of today's poblacion. Later, it was connected to the South Main Canal of the Angat-Maasim Irrigation System (AMRIS) from Bustos Dam, called Lateral J. From there, it flowed through Guiguinto and Bulakan until reaching Manila Bay.

At first, only a few people lived in the area, most of them related to each other. Each small group was led by a "tandis." They spoke different languages, such as Pampango, Pangasinan, Ilocano, and Tagalog. Priests from Malolos often visited to spread the Catholic faith, traveling on the Angat River using a bamboo raft called "balsa." The missionaries later cleared the land and started building settlements so they could unite the people. To do this, each "tandis" was asked to make a plan.

The groups of people labored, so much so that when the priest returned seven years later, he found the area completely cleared. The priests' party inquired among the natives as to whom the credit should go, and the Pampangos exclaimed, "Quing wawa". Thereafter, every now and then, to every question of the friars the people would reply "Quing wa". As a consequence, the place had come to be referred to as Quingua.

Like many towns in Bulacan, Plaridel has its niche in Philippine history as the site of the Battle of Quingua during the Philippine–American War as part of the defense of the First Philippine Republic against the Northern Campaign of the American Army. The battle, manned by Pablo Tecson—Lt. Colonel Pablo Ocampo Tecson of San Miguel, Bulacan—under Gregorio del Pilar on the side of the First Philippine Republic, led to the death of Col. John Stotsenberg of the American Army on April 23, 1899. A marker now stands at the site of the battle in barangay Agnaya.

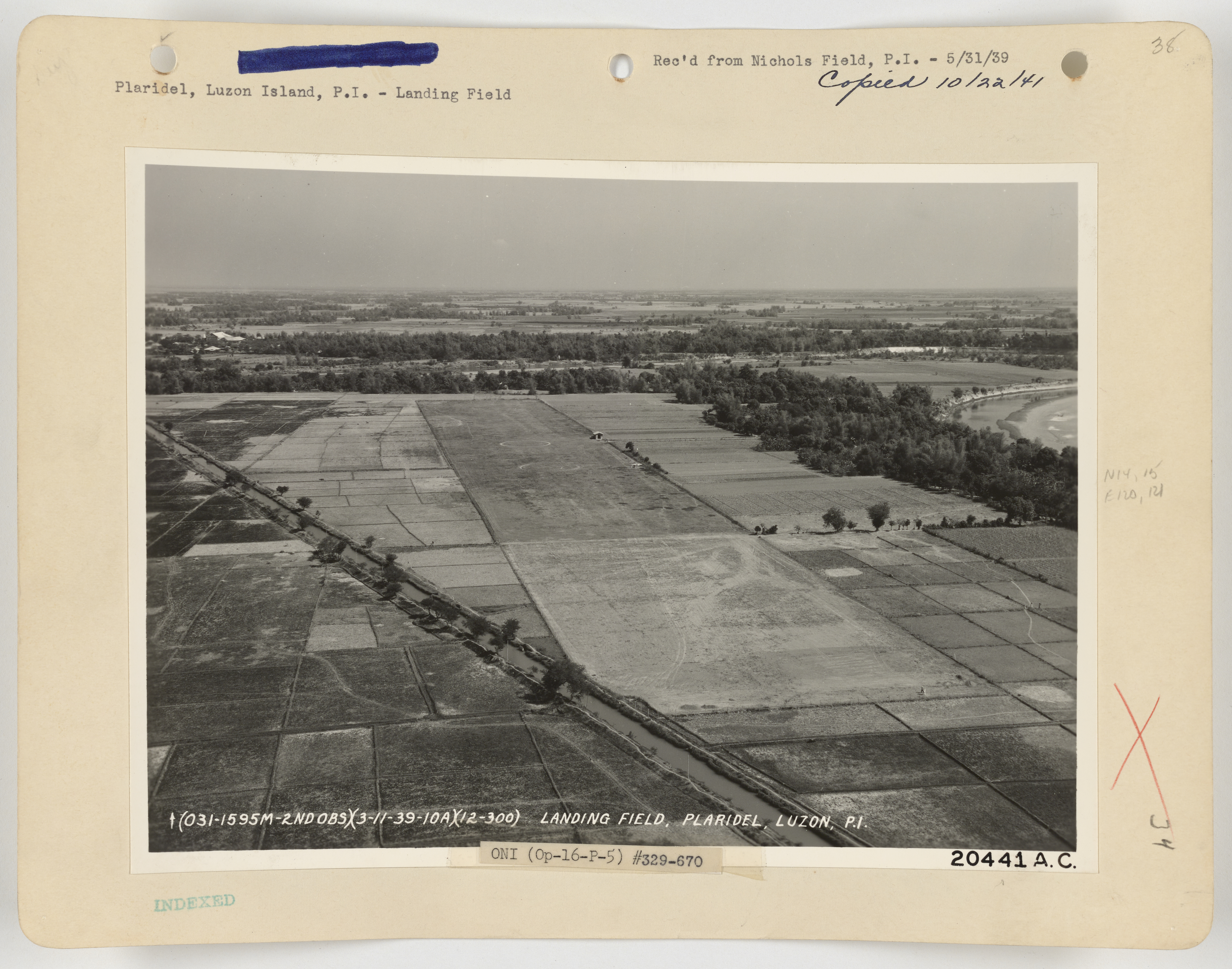
Plaridel airfield in the 1930s. The neighboring municipality of Pulilan is visible in the background.

During the presidency of Manuel L. Quezon, the then "Alcalde", or Town Mayor, of Quinga, Jose J. Mariano, took the initiative of renaming the town. Representative Pedro Magsalin, a friend of the Alcalde, sponsored the bill changing the name of the town from Quingua to Plaridel. The bill was passed by the Philippine Congress and was approved by the President, and on December 29, 1936, the town was renamed as 'Plaridel', in honor of the great hero of Bulacan, Marcelo H. del Pilar. The celebrations that followed were attended by political luminaries of the time, including Speaker Gil Montilla, Congressman Magsalin, Nicolas Buendia, Eulogio Rodriguez, Elpidio Quirino and Governor José Padilla, Sr.

== Geography ==
With the continuous expansion of Metro Manila, Plaridel is part of Manila's built-up area which reaches San Ildefonso, Bulacan at its northernmost part.

Plaridel is 18 kilometres (11 mi) from Malolos, 41 kilometres (25 mi) from Manila, and 7 kilometres (4.3 mi) from Guiguinto.

=== Barangays ===
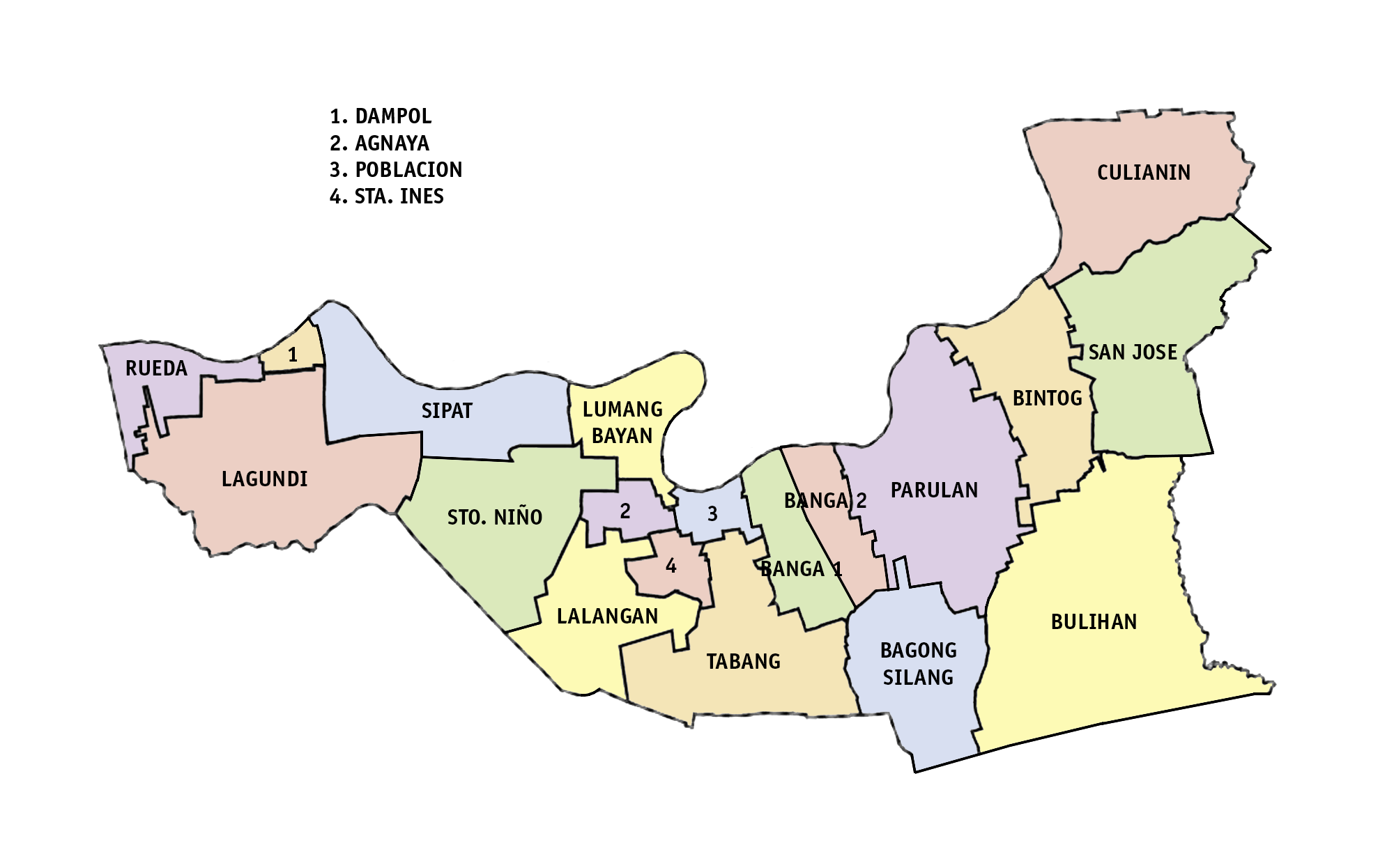
Political map of Plaridel

Plaridel is divided into 19 barangays, as shown in the matrix below. These barangays are headed by elected officials: Barangay Captain, Barangay Council, whose members are called Barangay Councilors. All are elected every three years. Each barangay consist of 7 puroks and some have sitios.

In 1954, sitio Mayamot in Barrio Banga was changed to Bagong Silang while a sitio in the eastern part of barrio Tabang, called Bagong Silang, was created.

PSGC	Barangay	Population			±% p.a.	
		2024		2010		
031417001	Agnaya	2.1%	2,585	2,633	▾	−0.13%
031417002	Bagong Silang	2.7%	3,322	2,775	▴	1.27%
031417003	Banga I	5.8%	7,030	6,710	▴	0.33%
031417004	Banga II	7.5%	9,036	8,775	▴	0.21%
031417005	Bintog	3.4%	4,122	3,930	▴	0.33%
031417006	Bulihan	4.7%	5,721	5,404	▴	0.40%
031417007	Culianin	3.4%	4,130	4,177	▾	−0.08%
031417008	Dampol	2.6%	3,183	3,111	▴	0.16%
031417010	Lagundi	3.5%	4,243	4,135	▴	0.18%
031417011	Lalangan	1.7%	2,077	1,923	▴	0.54%
031417012	Lumang Bayan	4.4%	5,361	4,370	▴	1.44%
031417014	Parulan	6.3%	7,590	8,461	▾	−0.76%
031417015	Poblacion	3.2%	3,901	3,907	▾	−0.01%
031417016	Rueda	1.5%	1,803	1,788	▴	0.06%
031417017	San Jose	3.7%	4,448	4,197	▴	0.41%
031417018	Santa Ines	2.4%	2,953	2,319	▴	1.71%
031417019	Santo Niño	8.9%	10,761	9,744	▴	0.70%
031417020	Sipat	4.8%	5,856	5,367	▴	0.61%
031417021	Tabang	16.3%	19,683	17,715	▴	0.74%
	Total		120,939	101,441	▴	1.24%

=== Climate ===
Climate data for Plaridel, Bulacan
Month	Jan	Feb	Mar	Apr	May	Jun	Jul	Aug	Sep	Oct	Nov	Dec	Year
Mean daily maximum °C (°F)	28 (82)	29 (84)	31 (88)	33 (91)	32 (90)	31 (88)	30 (86)	29 (84)	29 (84)	30 (86)	30 (86)	28 (82)	30 (86)
Mean daily minimum °C (°F)	20 (68)	20 (68)	21 (70)	22 (72)	24 (75)	24 (75)	24 (75)	24 (75)	24 (75)	23 (73)	22 (72)	21 (70)	22 (72)
Average precipitation mm (inches)	6 (0.2)	4 (0.2)	6 (0.2)	17 (0.7)	82 (3.2)	122 (4.8)	151 (5.9)	123 (4.8)	124 (4.9)	99 (3.9)	37 (1.5)	21 (0.8)	792 (31.1)
Average rainy days	3.3	2.5	11.7	6.6	17.7	22.2	25.2	23.7	23.2	17.9	9.2	5.2	168.4
Source: Meteoblue

== Demographics ==
Population census of Plaridel
Year	Pop.	±% p.a.
1903	7,229	—
1918	8,216	+0.86%
1939	11,161	+1.47%
1948	14,290	+2.78%
1960	18,714	+2.27%
1970	27,648	+3.98%
1975	32,613	+3.37%
1980	39,121	+3.70%
1990	52,954	+3.07%
1995	66,355	+4.32%
2000	80,481	+4.22%
2007	97,225	+2.64%
2010	101,441	+1.56%
2015	107,805	+1.17%
2020	114,432	+1.26%
2024	120,939	+1.34%
Source: Philippine Statistics Authority

In the 2020 census, the population of Plaridel, Bulacan, was 114,432 people, with a density of 3,500 inhabitants per square kilometre or 9,100 inhabitants per square mile.

== Economy ==
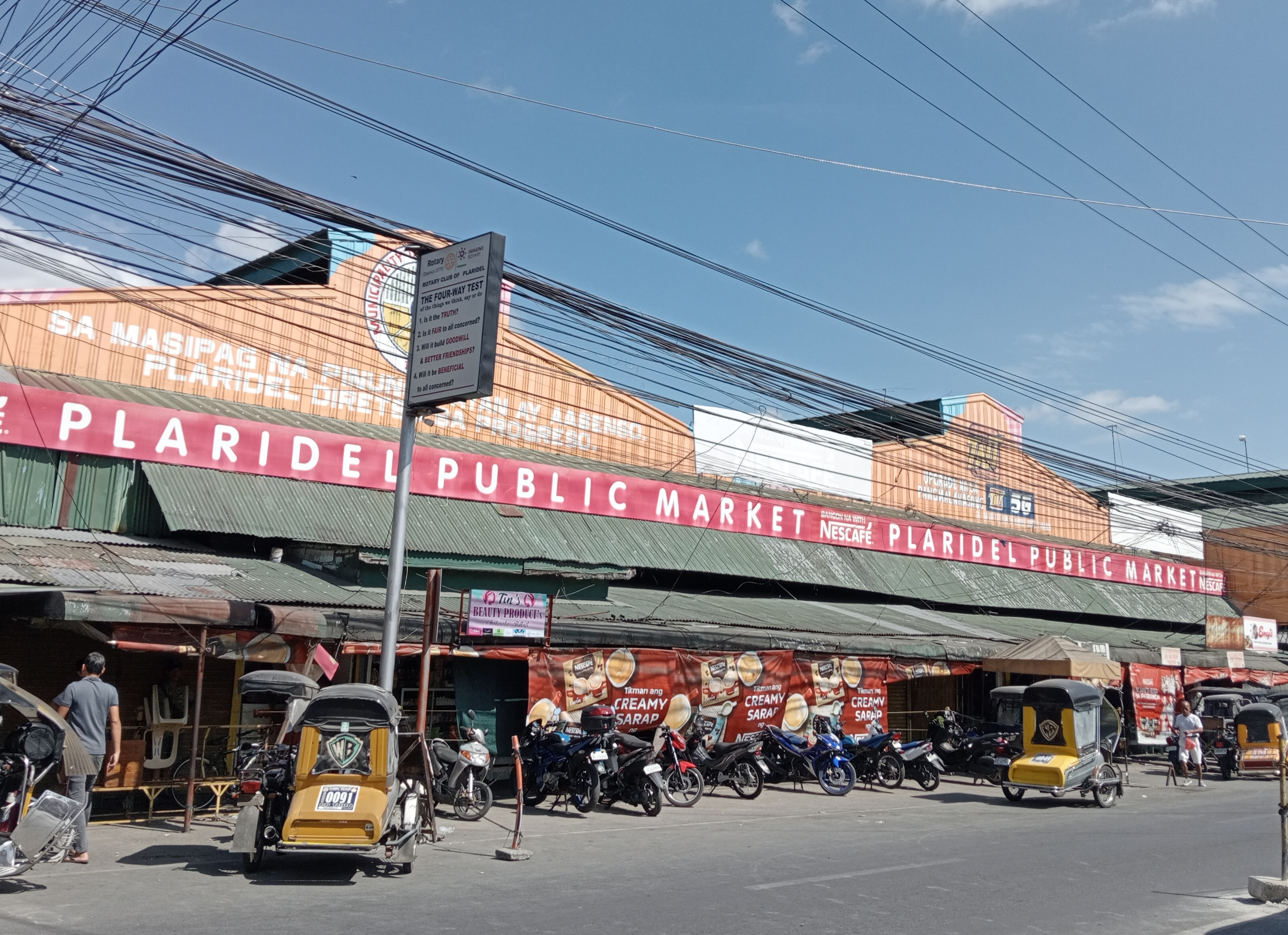
Public market

Poverty incidence of Plaridel

Source: Philippine Statistics Authority

== Government ==
=== Elected officials ===
Position	Name	Party
Mayor	Jocell Aimee R. Vistan	NUP
Vice Mayor	Imelda G. De Leon	Independent
Councilors	Seth Josiah Cucio	Aksyon
Councilors	Sheila Ana Enrina R. Enriquez	NUP
Councilors	Grace Alcantara	Independent
Councilors	Rosette Geronimo	Independent
Councilors	Ryan Christian Sagala	NUP
Councilors	Aimee San Gabriel	NUP
Councilors	AC De Leon	NUP
Councilors	Raul Gatuz	NUP
Ex Officio Municipal Council Members
ABC President	Leoncio Ramos	Nonpartisan
SK Federation President	Marcuz Miranda Gutierrez	Nonpartisan

== Tourism ==
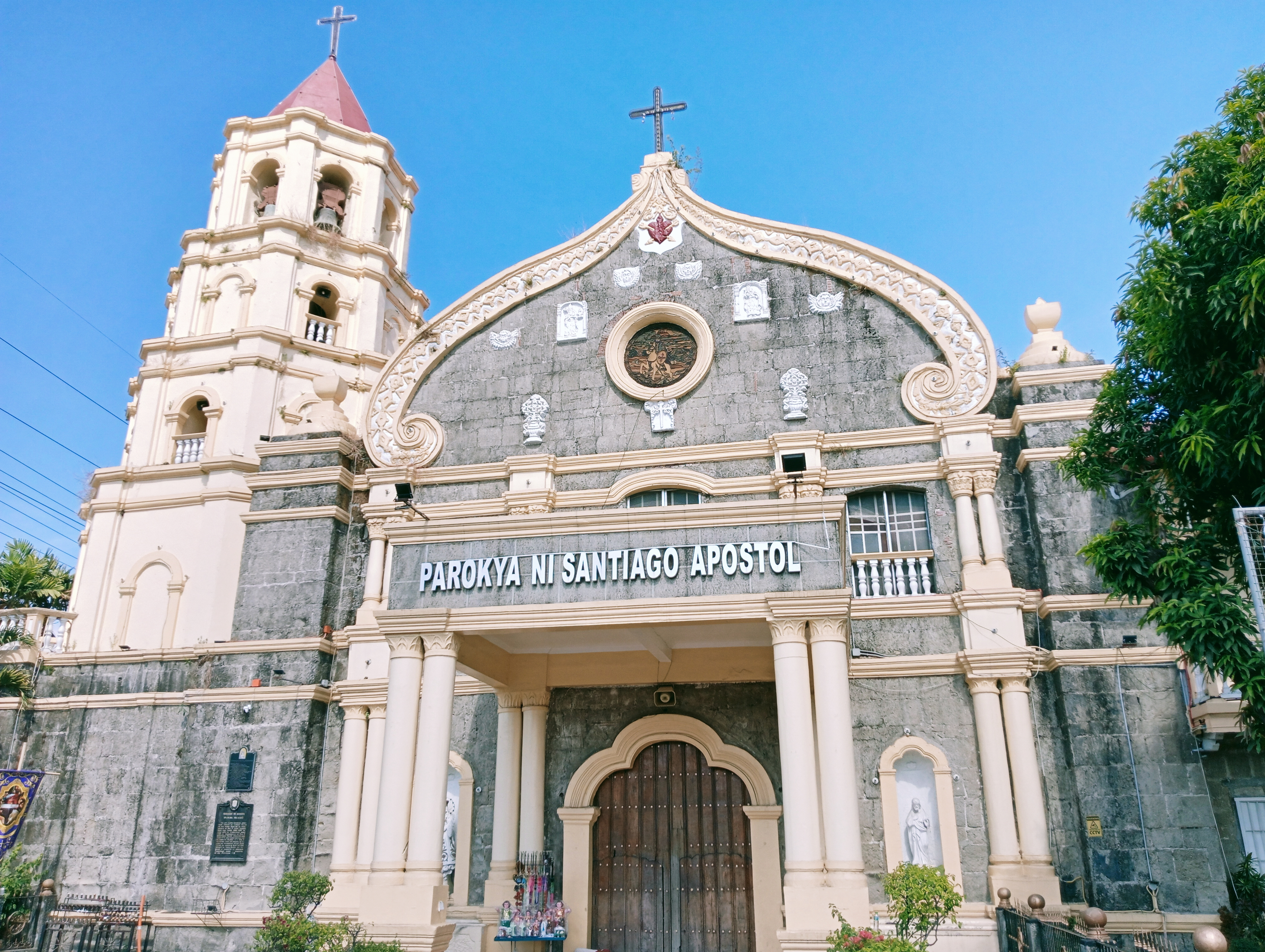
Quingua Church built in 1602 is dedicated to the apostle James the Greater, and named after Santiago de Compostela in Spain.

=== Parish Church of Santiago Apostol ===
The Plaridel Church was initially a mission chapel built by the Augustinians in Malolos made of light materials. The chapel was located near River at Lumang Bayan and transferred to present site. It is clearly evident why the said Barrio named Lumang Bayan means-Old Poblacion. From 1590 to 1602, Quingua was administered by Friar Curate from Malolos Church which close at hand.

The present church was built in 1602 and established as the town church of the newly created Pueblo de Quingua.

Plaridel is one of the earliest settlement to be established at around 1590 as Encomienda. Its Parish Church of Santiago Apostol has one of the unique Moorish architectural style among the Augustinian Churches in the province. It was here that the money and jewels of san Agustin in Intramuros, Manila were kept during British Occupation in 1762–63.

The church is small and its two level facade is bare. However, the crowning pediment is elaborate consisting of a pair of volutes with the inner space filled with triangular patterns and floral embellishments that first glance can be mistaken as having a Moorish influence because of the minaret like dome formed. In between the volutes are a series of spaced relieves of cherubs, ramilletes, two saints including that of St. Augustine and the pierced heart which is the symbol of the Augustinian Order. The octagonal and tapering belltower on the other hand sits on a quadrilateral base and rises 4 levels.Visita Iglesia: The old churches of Bulacan, Part 1 of 2

The Parish Church of Santiago Apostol is the location of GMA Network's Fantaserye Darna (2009), Zaido (2007), Iglot (2011) and afternoon drama series, Nita Negrita (2011), Broken Vow (2012). And the Judy Ann Santos-Sarah Geronimo Movie Hating Kapatid in July 2010.

And recently, ABS-CBN's drama anthology Maalaala mo kaya: Toga, starring Albie Casiño and Erich Gonzales and the episode of Police Uniform" starring Empress and Joseph Marco.

=== Salubong Festival or Horse Festival ===
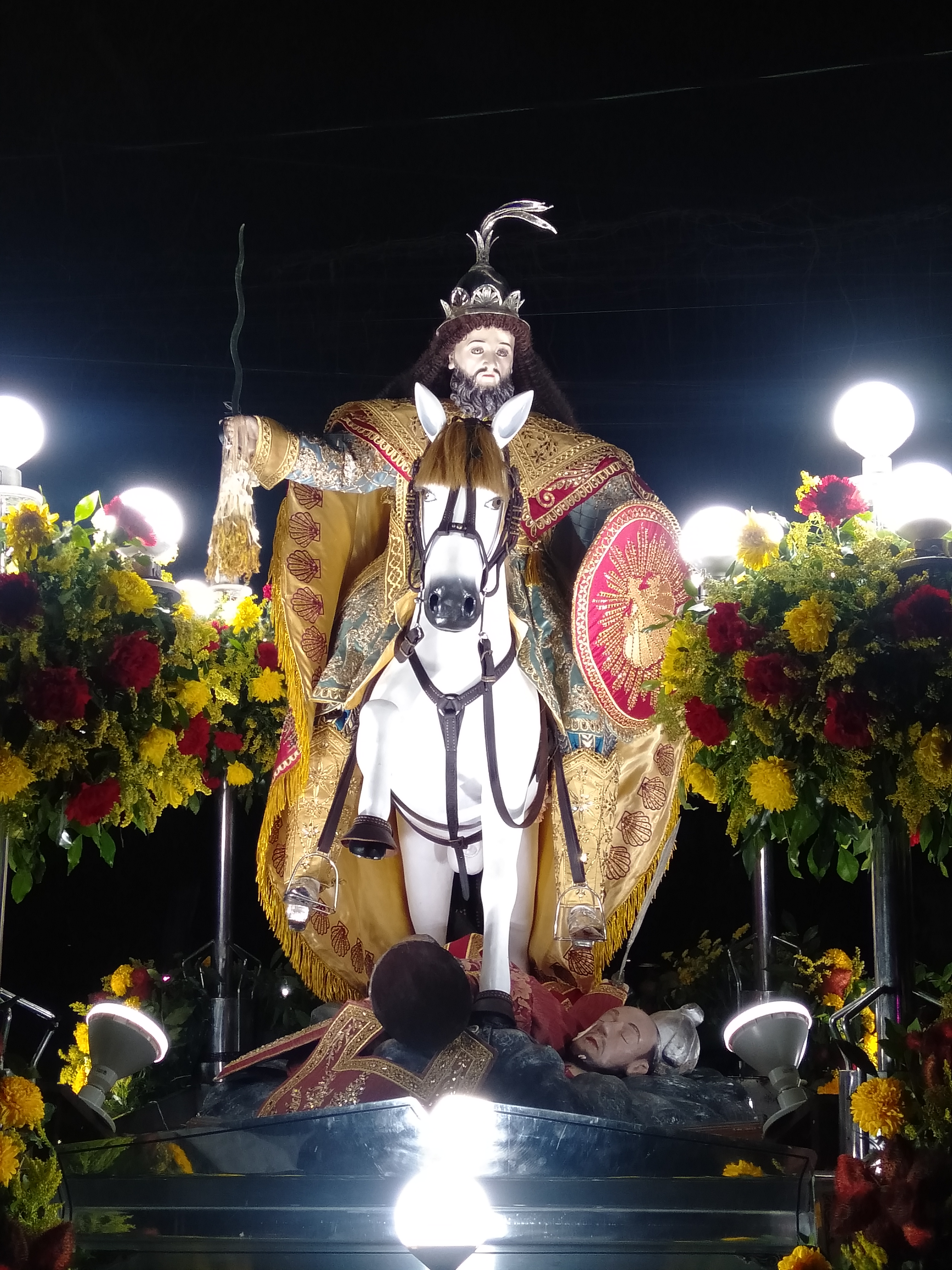
Santiago Apostol, the patron saint of Plaridel, Bulacan

The Salubong Festival is celebrated annually every December 29. It is called salubong or welcome because they welcome the St. James the Greater's equestrian replica from Sipat. It is also called Horse festival because they parade calesas, tiburins (non-roofed calesa) and equestrians and hold horse racing in the afternoon.

=== Other Attractions ===
- Battle Of Quingua Monument
- Plaridel Airport

== Education ==
The Plaridel Schools District Office governs all educational institutions within the municipality. It oversees the management and operations of all private and public, from primary to secondary schools.

=== Primary and elementary schools ===
- Banga Elementary School
- Bintog Elementary School
- Colegio de Santiago Apostol
- Culianin Elementary School
- Dampol Elementary School
- Don Nemencio Clemena Memmorial School (Bulihan Elementary School)
- Jesus is Lord Christian School
- Lagundi Elementary School
- Lalangan Elementary School
- Light in the Haus Christian School
- Lord's Angels Montessori School
- Lucas N. Domingo Elementary School (Bagong Silang Elementary School)
- Lumangbayan Elementary School
- Maranatha Christian Academy of Cagayan Valley
- Mayi Montessori School
- Mondriaan Aura Montessori School
- Montessori School of Malolos II
- Parulan Elementary School
- PBC Sunbeam School
- Plaridel Central School
- Rocka Christian Academy
- Rohi Lambs' Learning House
- Rueda Elementary School
- San Jose Elementary School
- Sipat Elementary School
- Sipat Unida Christian Academy
- Solid Ground School
- St. Francis de Assisi Montessori School
- St. James Academy
- Sto. Nino Elementary School
- Tabang Elementary School
- Three Star Learning Center School of Rocka
- Victory Churches of Asia Academy

=== Secondary schools ===
- Banga High School
- Bethel Christian Academy
- Colegio de Immaculada Concepcion
- Bulihan High School
- Dampol 1st National High School
- Dr. Felipe de Jesus High School
- Jaime J. Vistan High School
- Jose J. Mariano Memorial High School
- St. Jude College of Bulacan

=== Higher educational institutions ===
- DPR - Philippine Academy in Technology and Sciences
- Next Generation Technological College
- Next Generation Technological College (Poblacion)
- Richwell Colleges

== Gallery ==
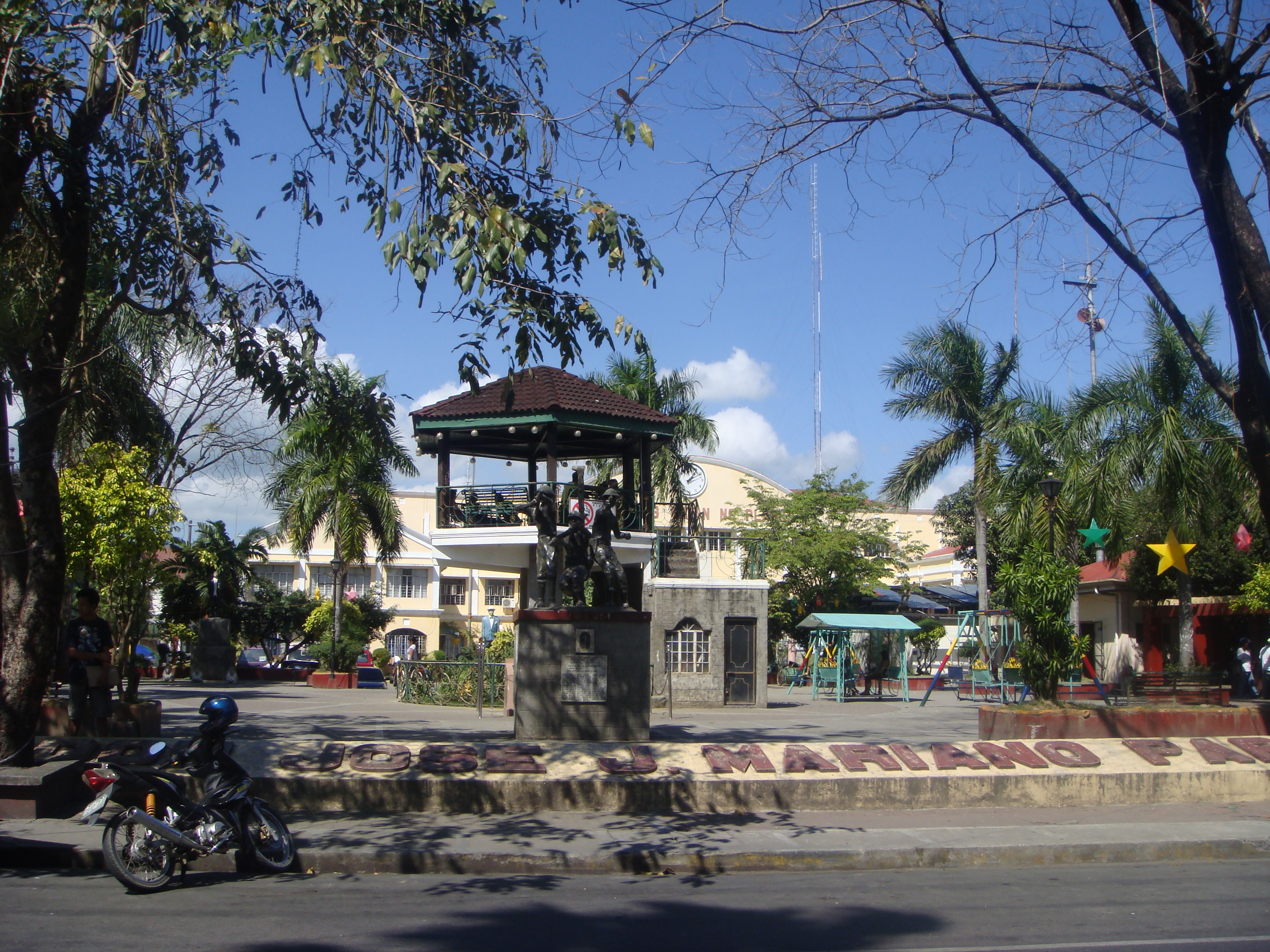
Don Jose J. Mariano Park

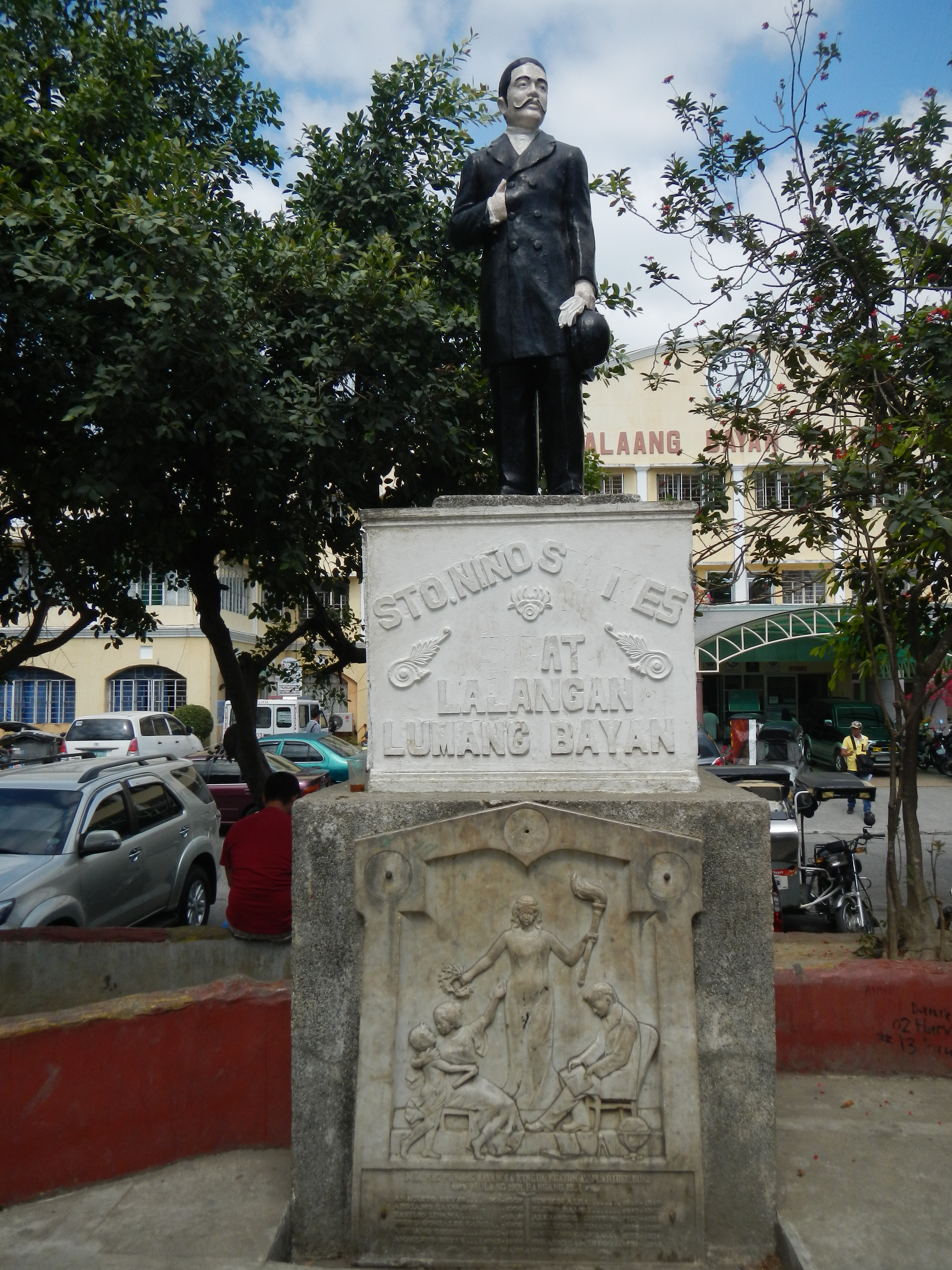
Marcelo H. Del Pilar Statue in front of the Municipal Hall

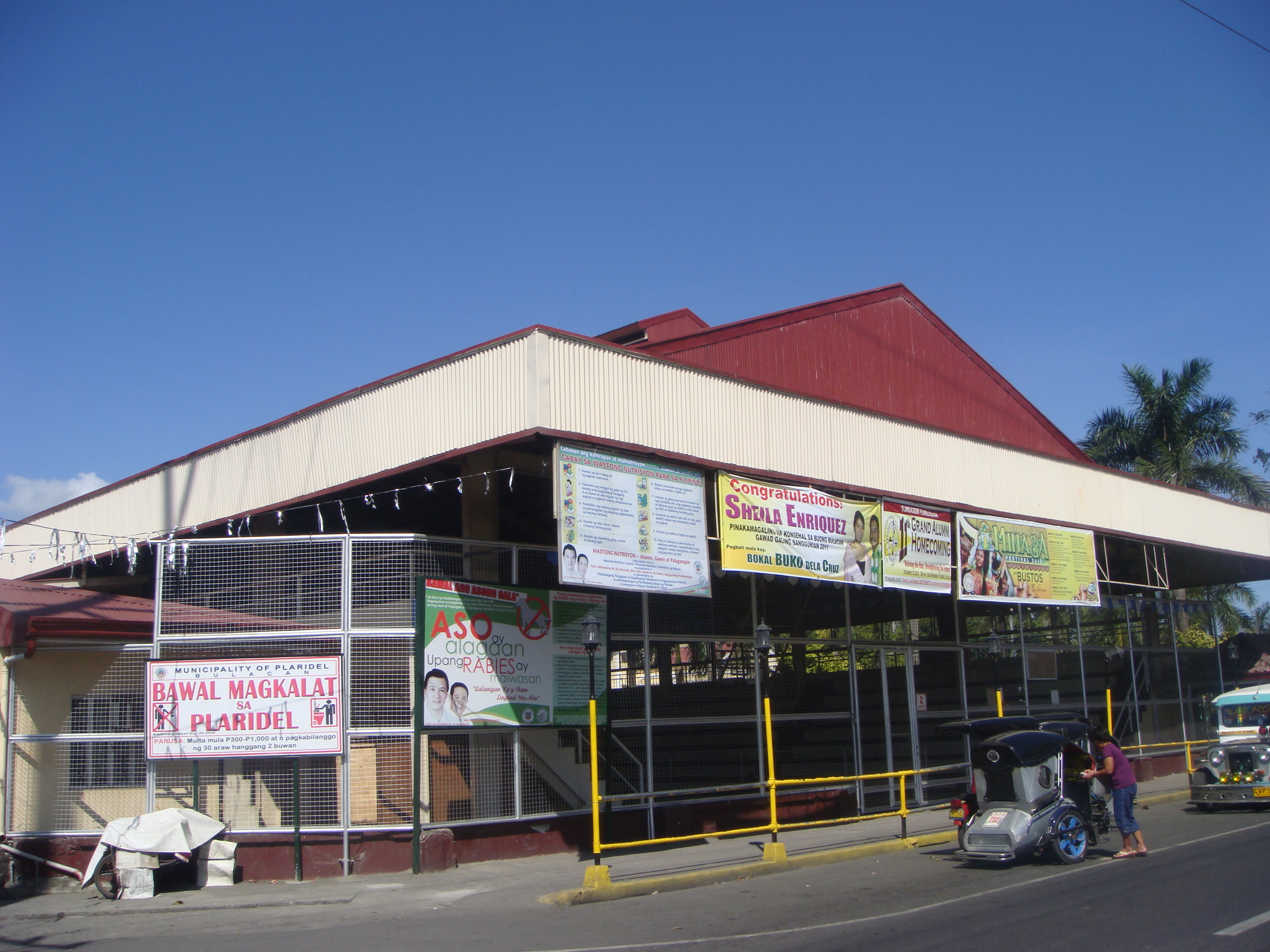
Don Cesario Multi-purpose Gymnasium

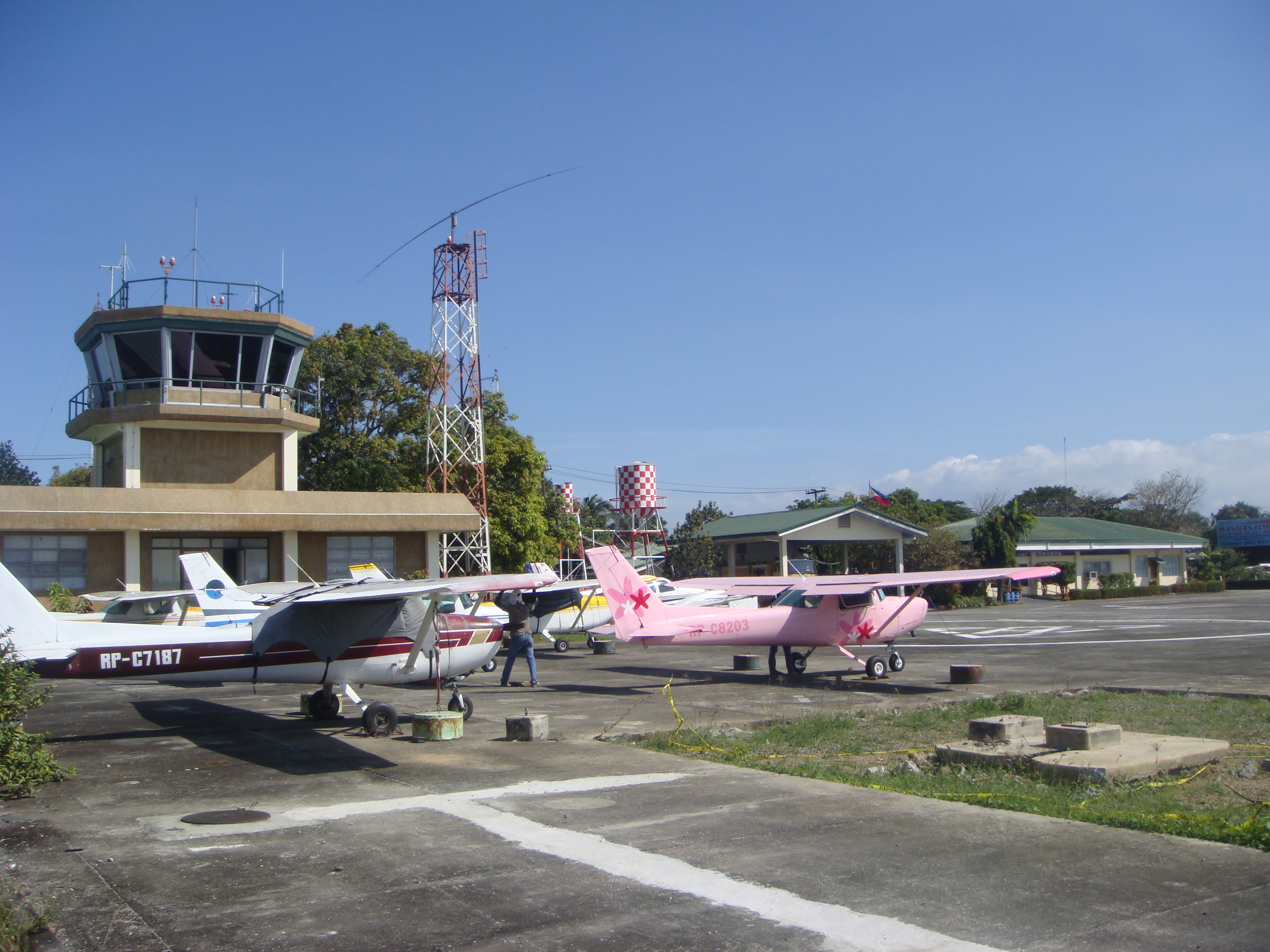
Control tower of Plaridel Airport and parked planes of the aviation schools located at the airport

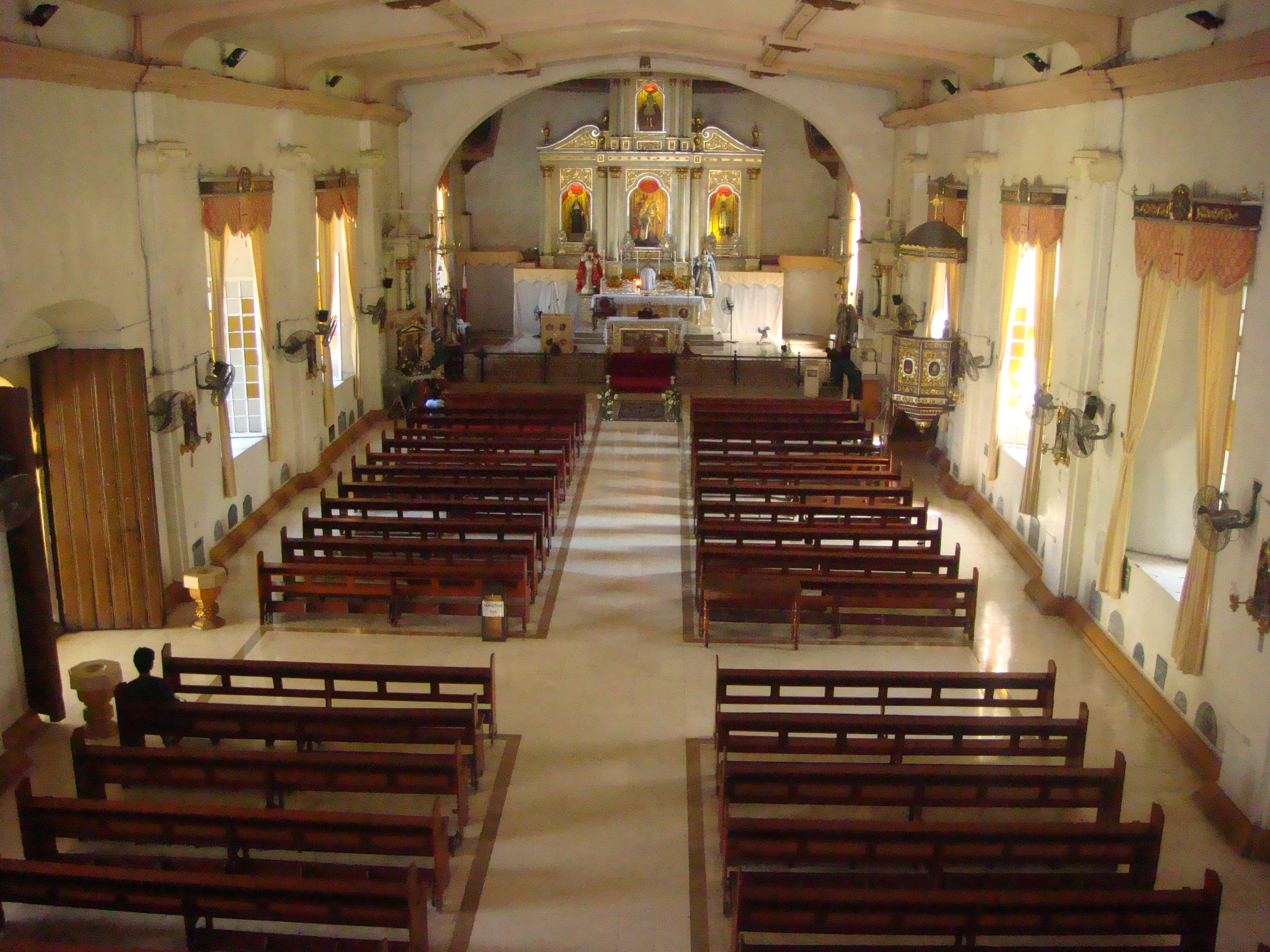
Overview of the interior of the Parish of St. James the Apostle church

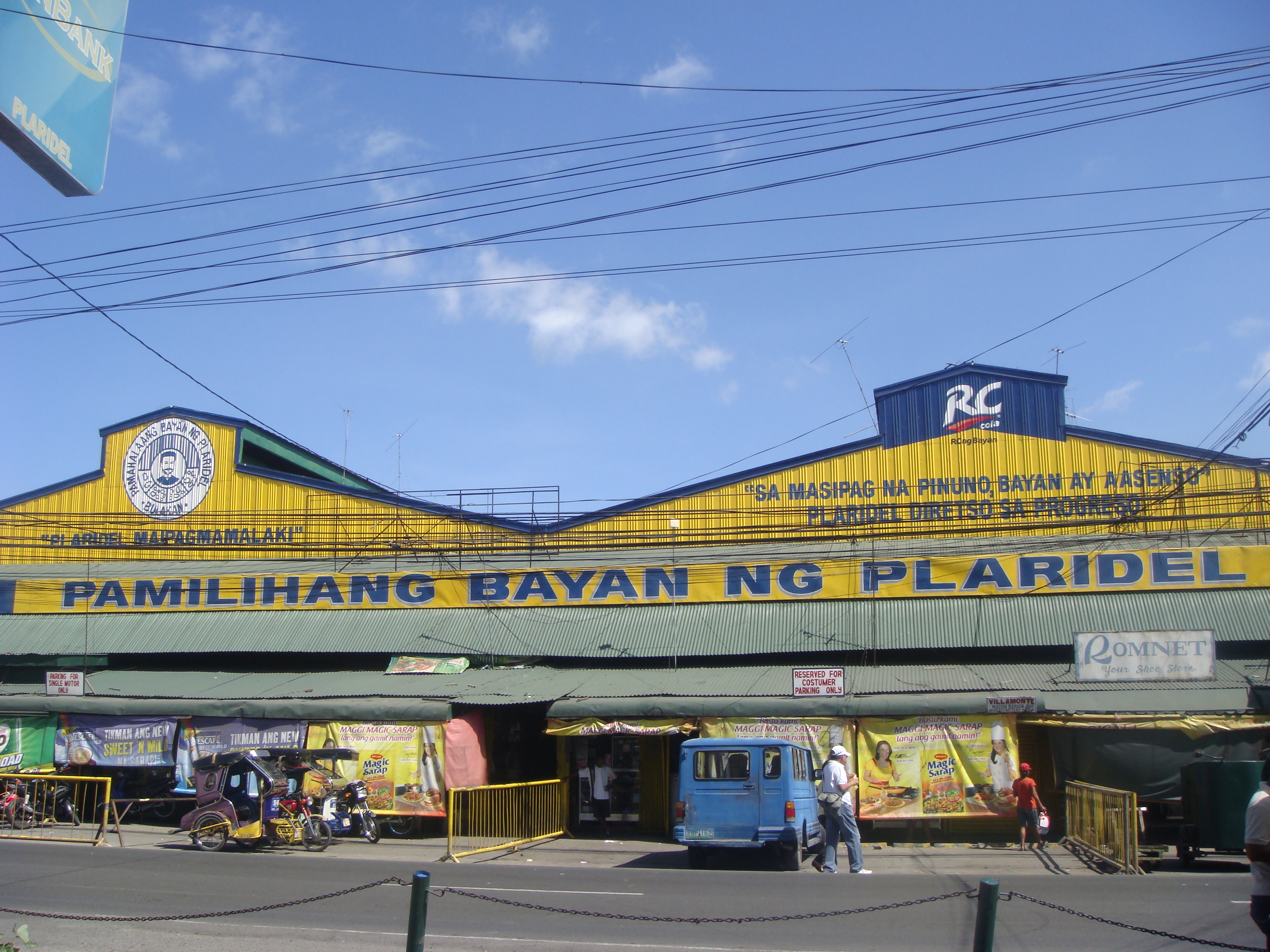
Plaridel Wet and Dry Public Market

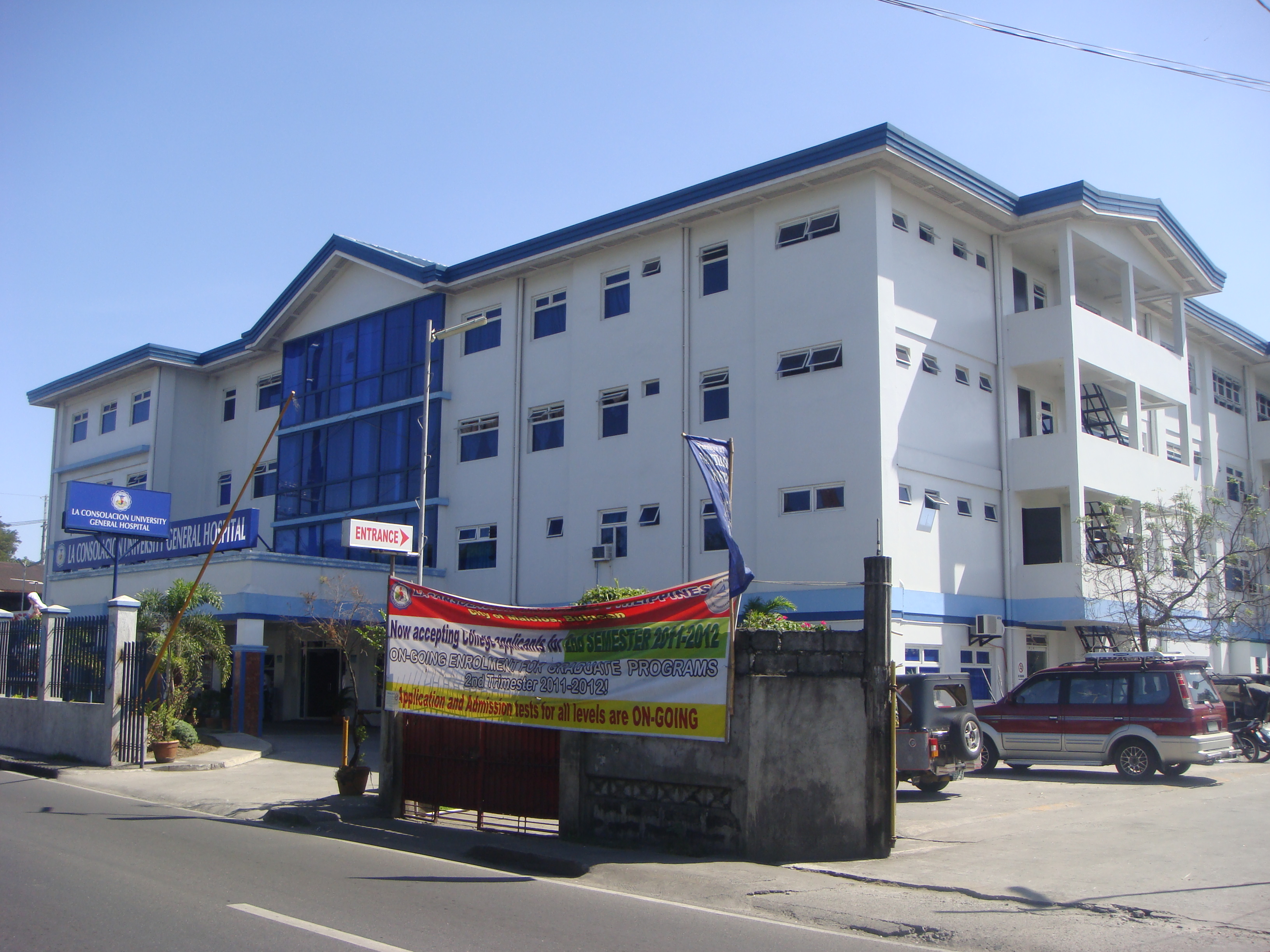
La Consolacion University General Hospital (formerly University of Regina Carmeli)

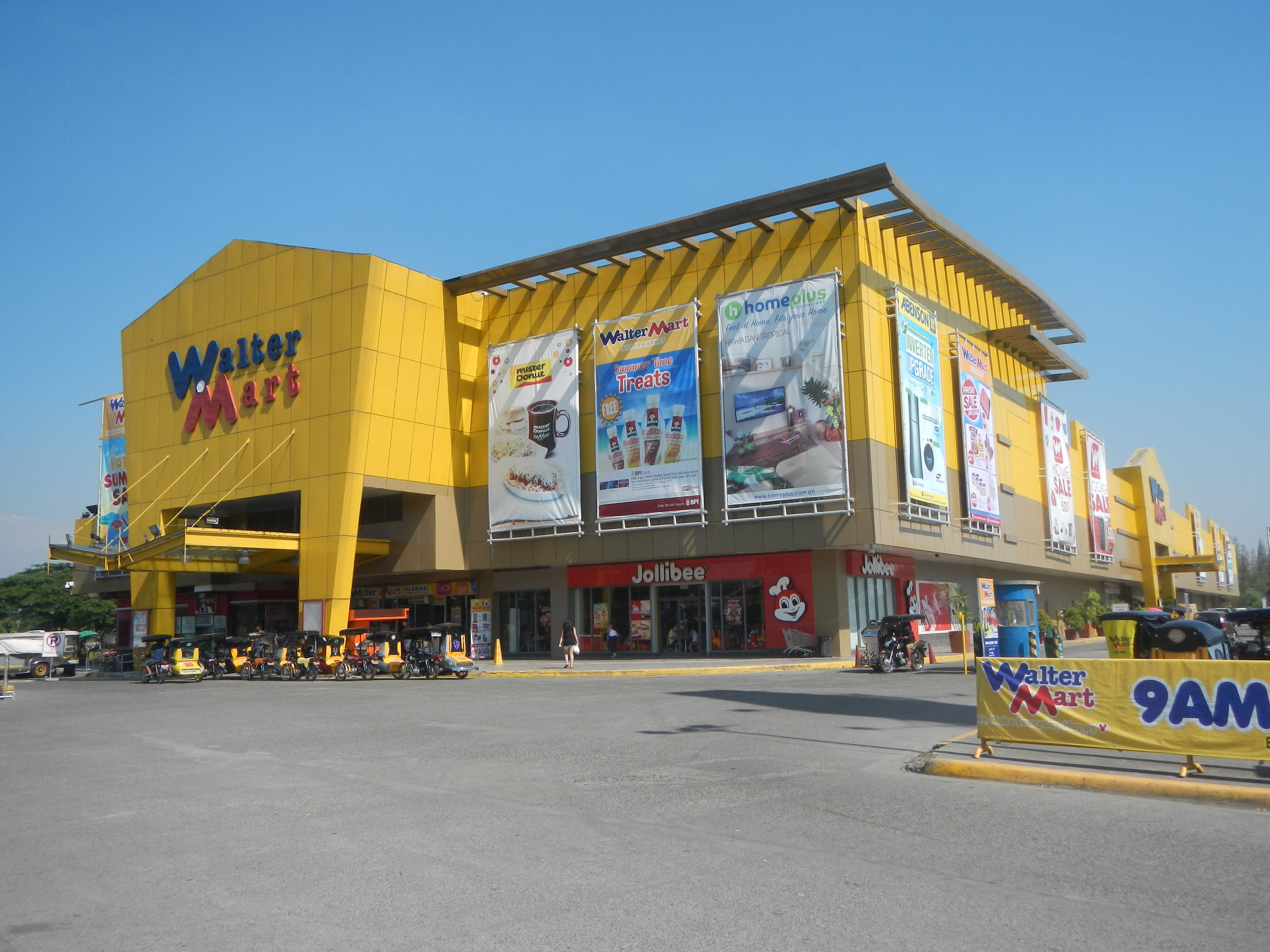
Walter Mart Plaridel

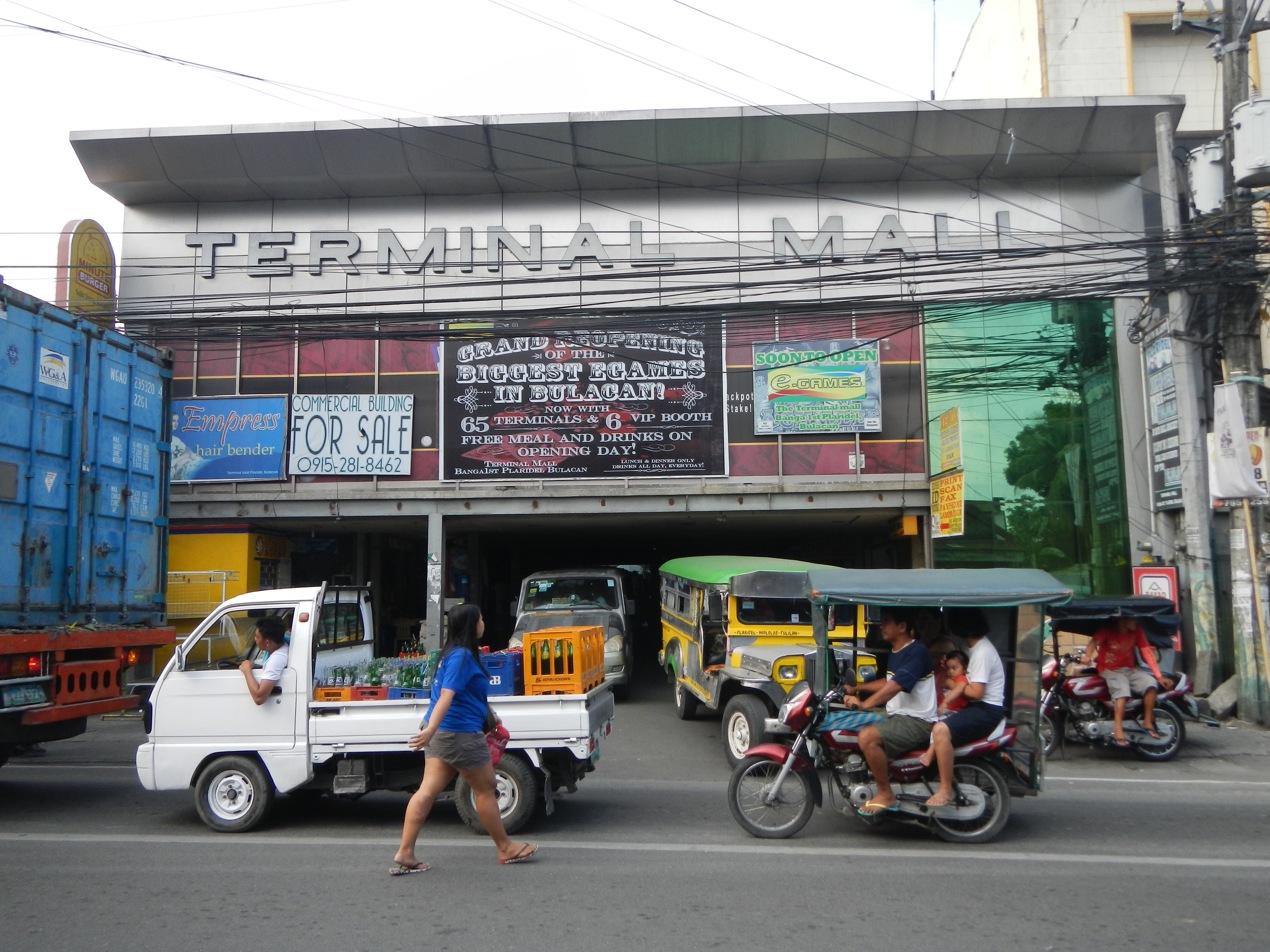
Facade of Plaridel Terminal Mall

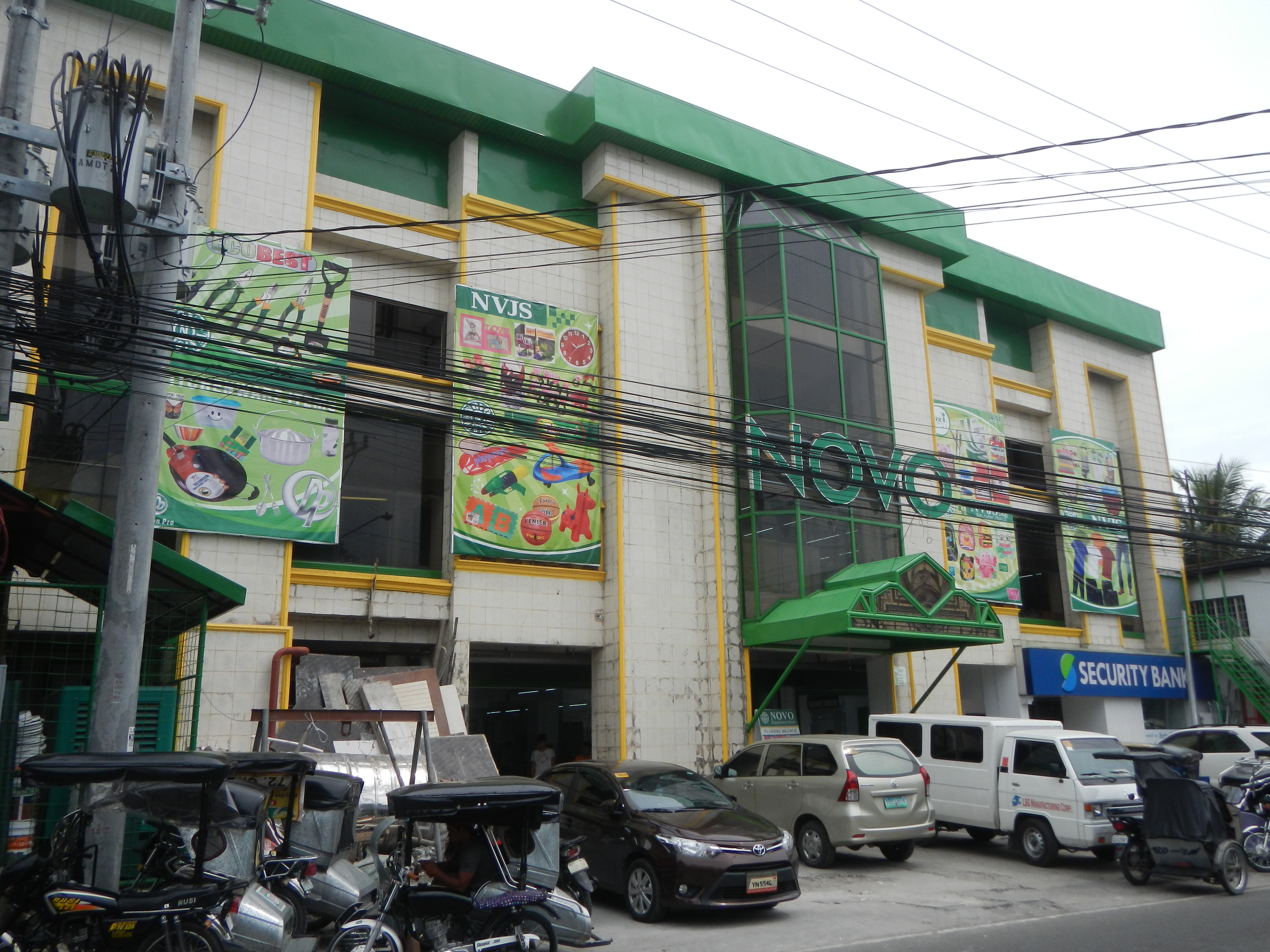
Front of Novo Department Store Plaridel

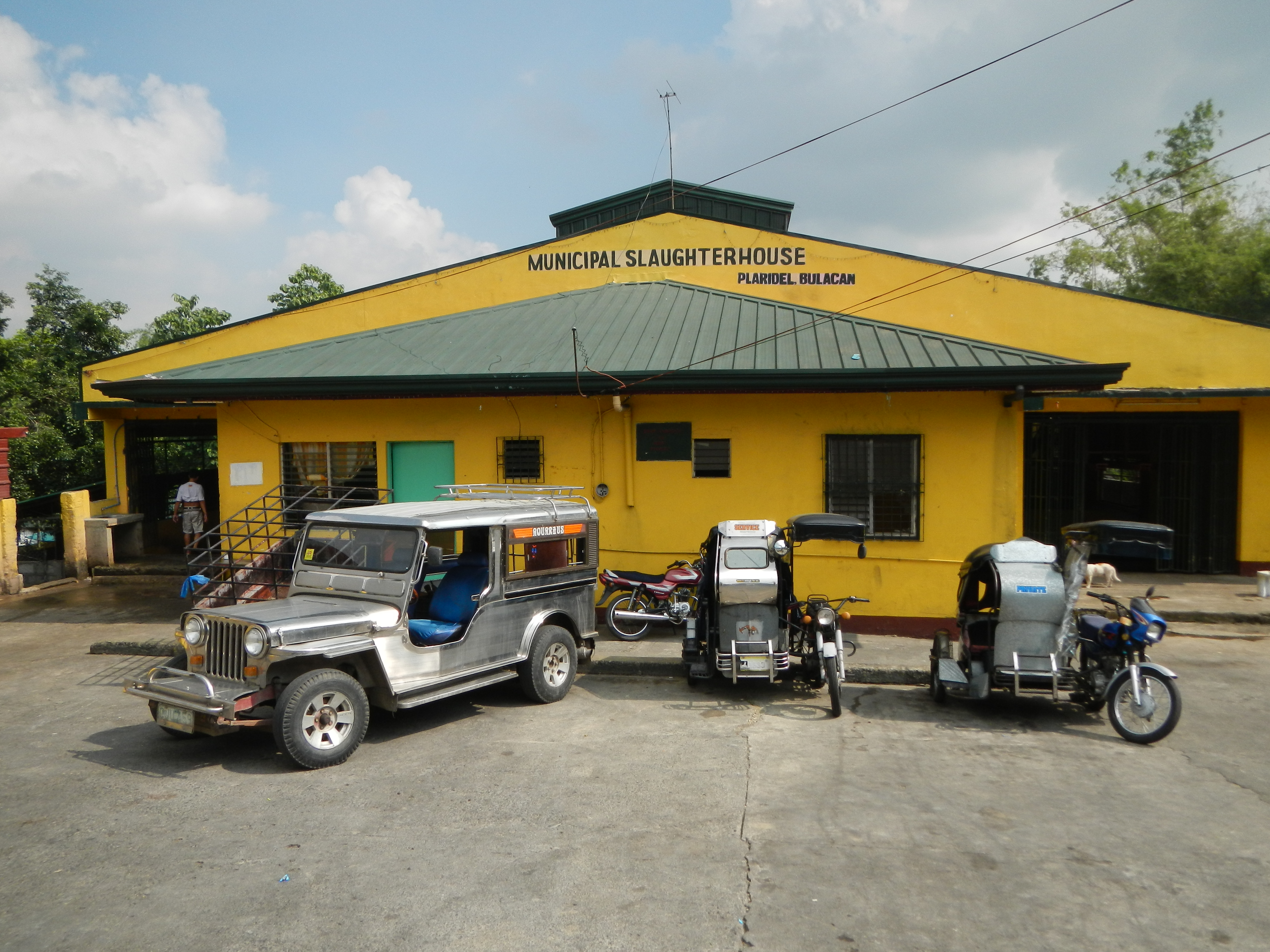
Front of the Plaridel Municipal Slaughterhouse

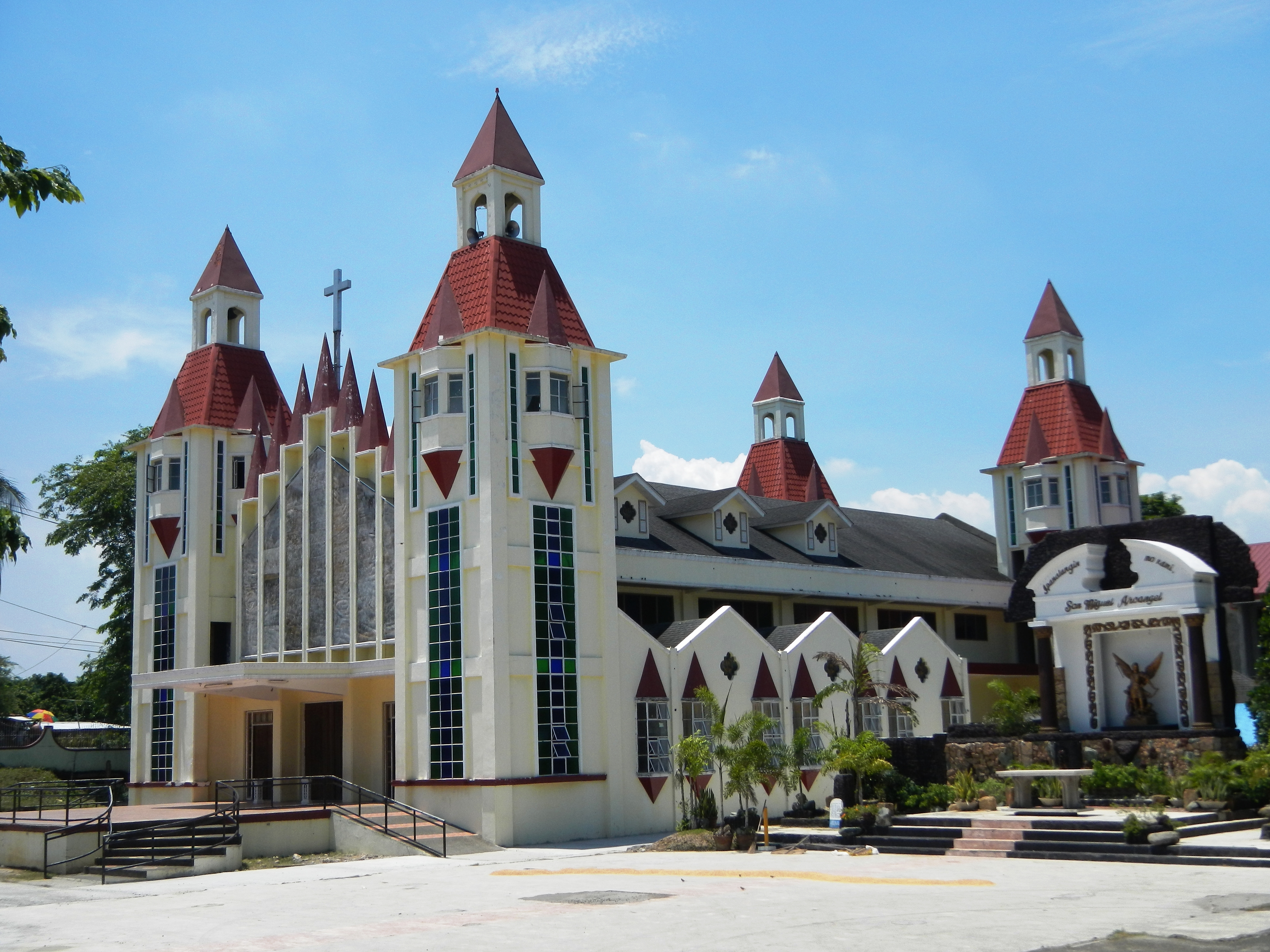
San Miguel Arkanghel Parish Church

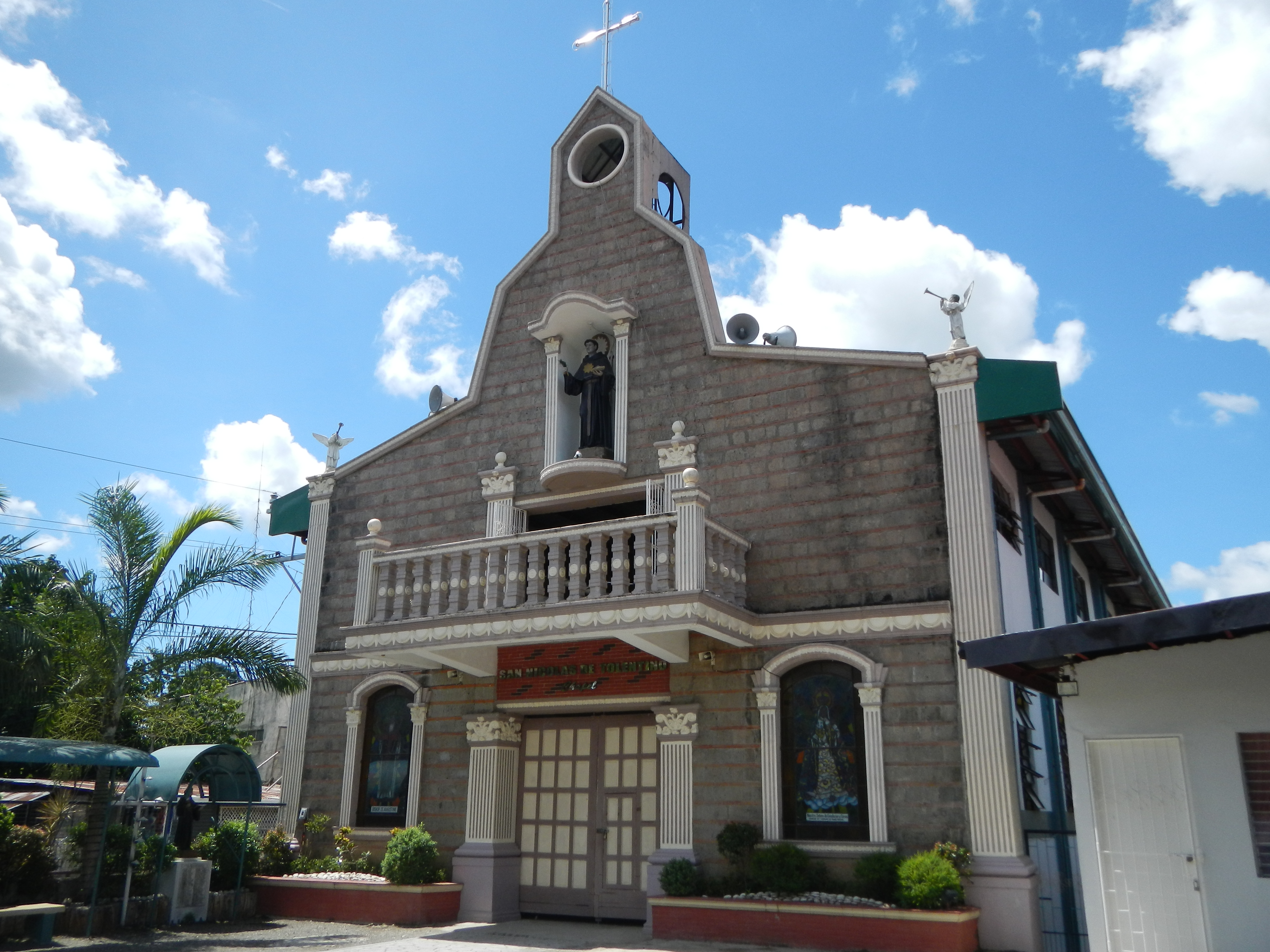
San Nicolas de Tolentino Chapel

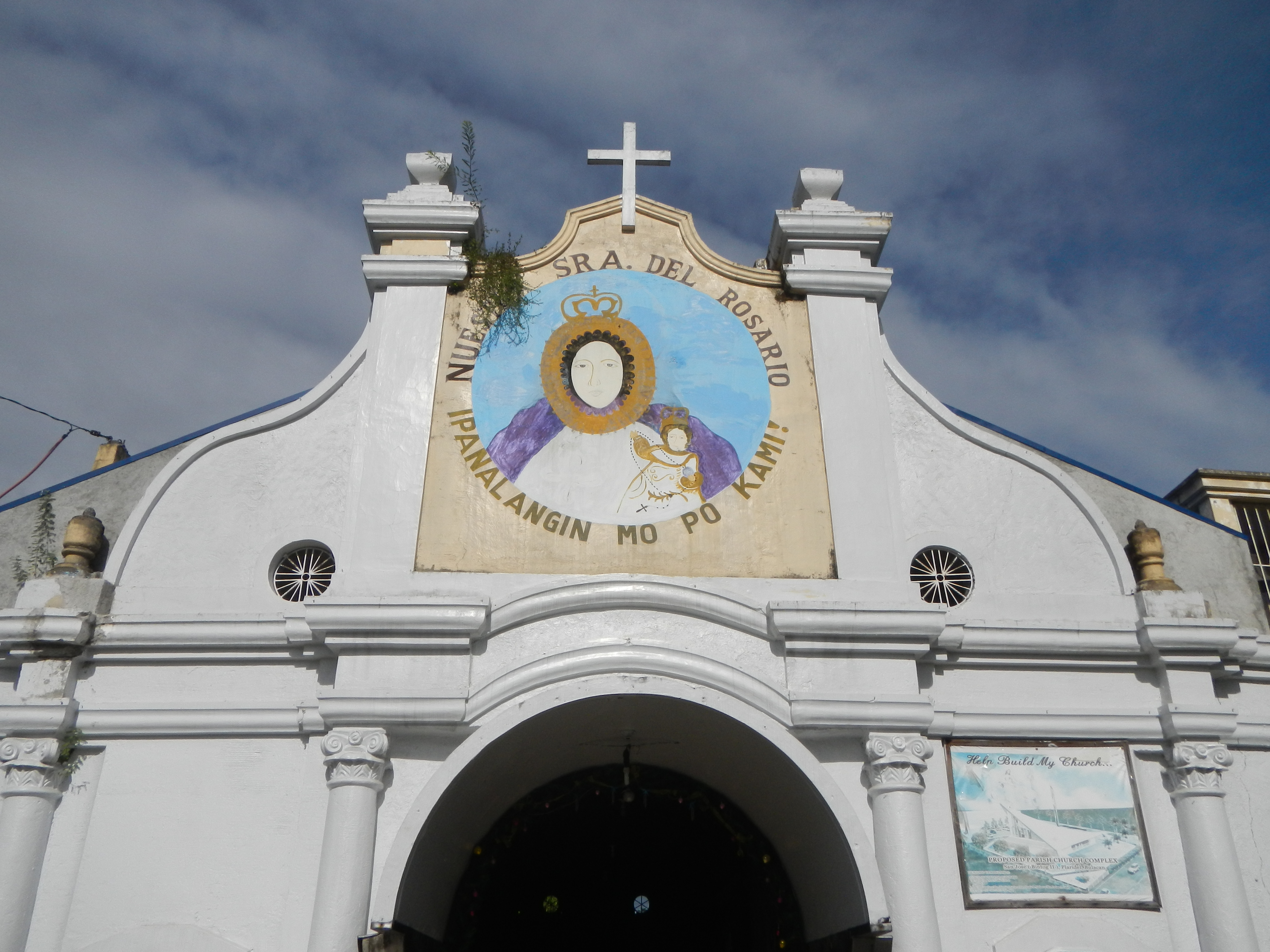
Nuestra Señora del Rosario Chapel

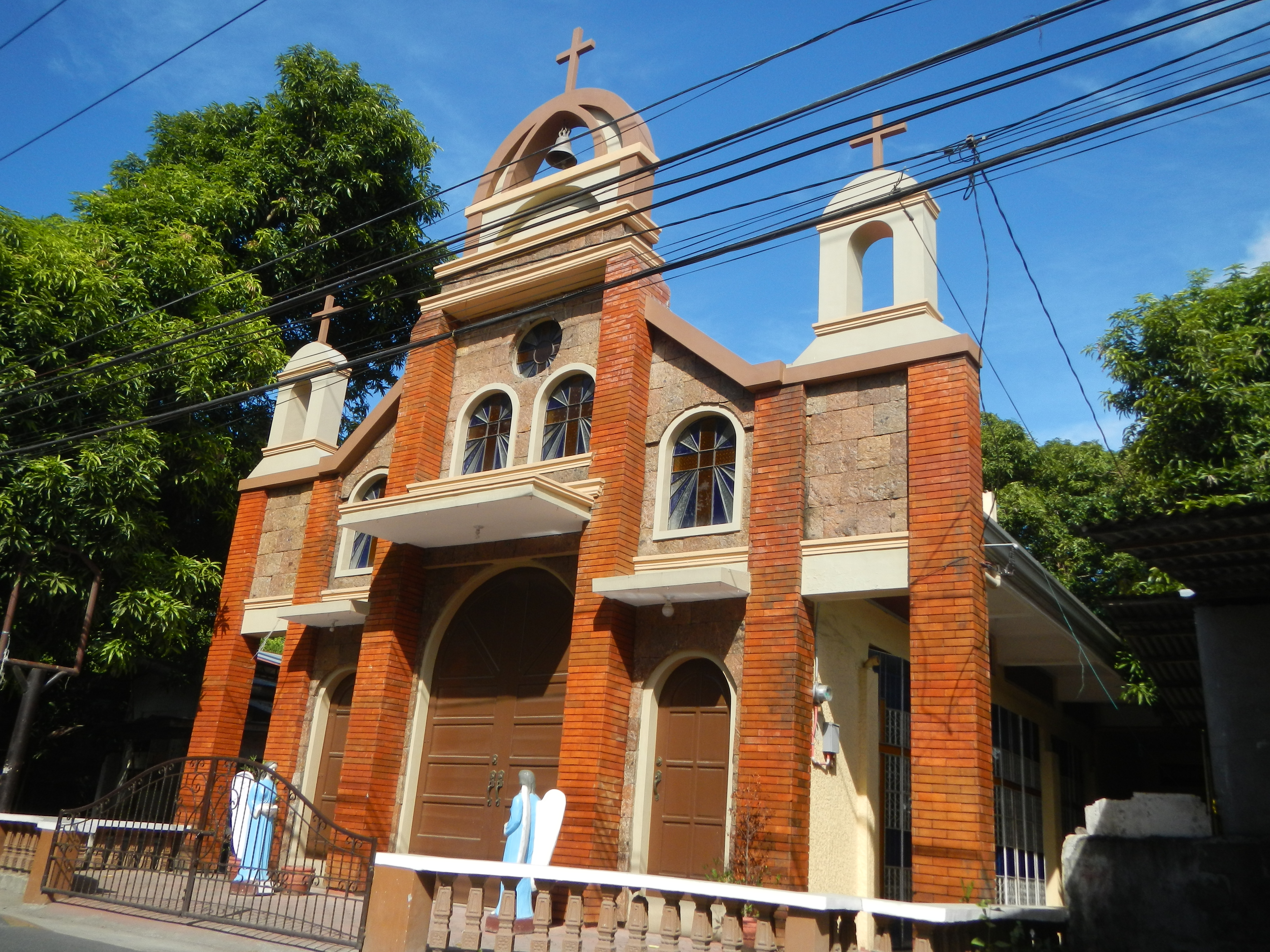
Chapel of the Holy Cross

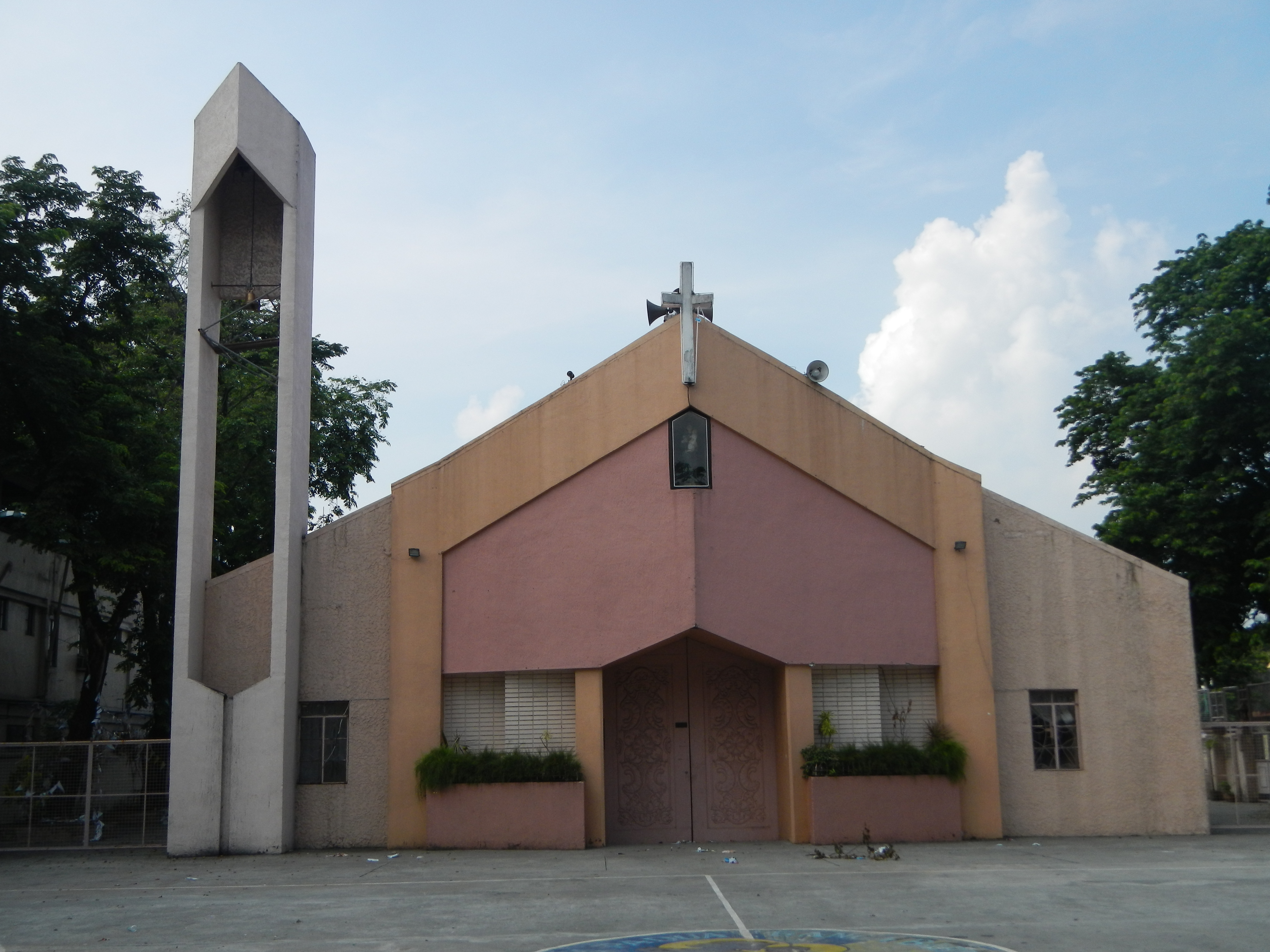
Saint Anthony of Padua Chapel

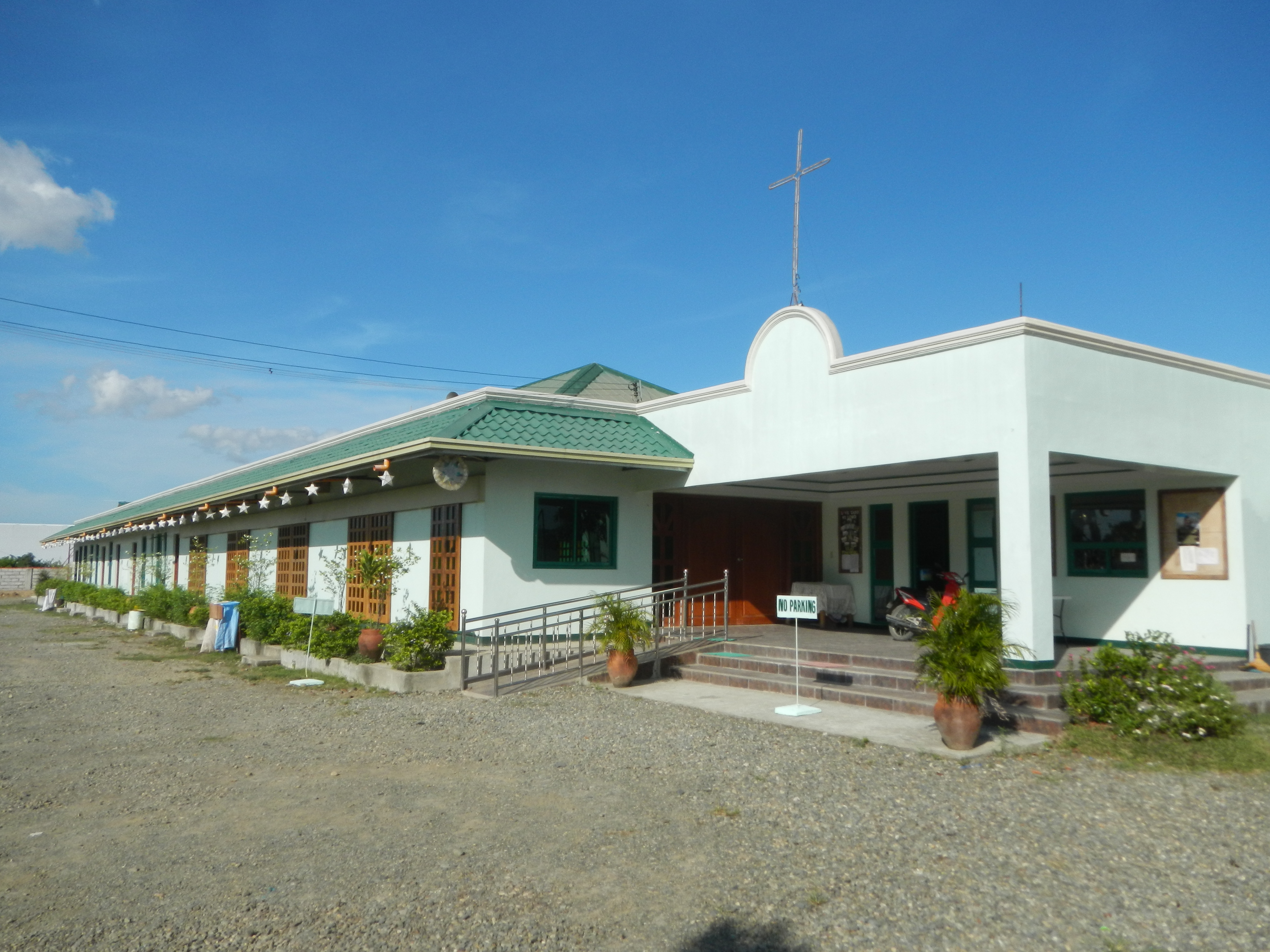
Holy Angels Quasi-parish Church

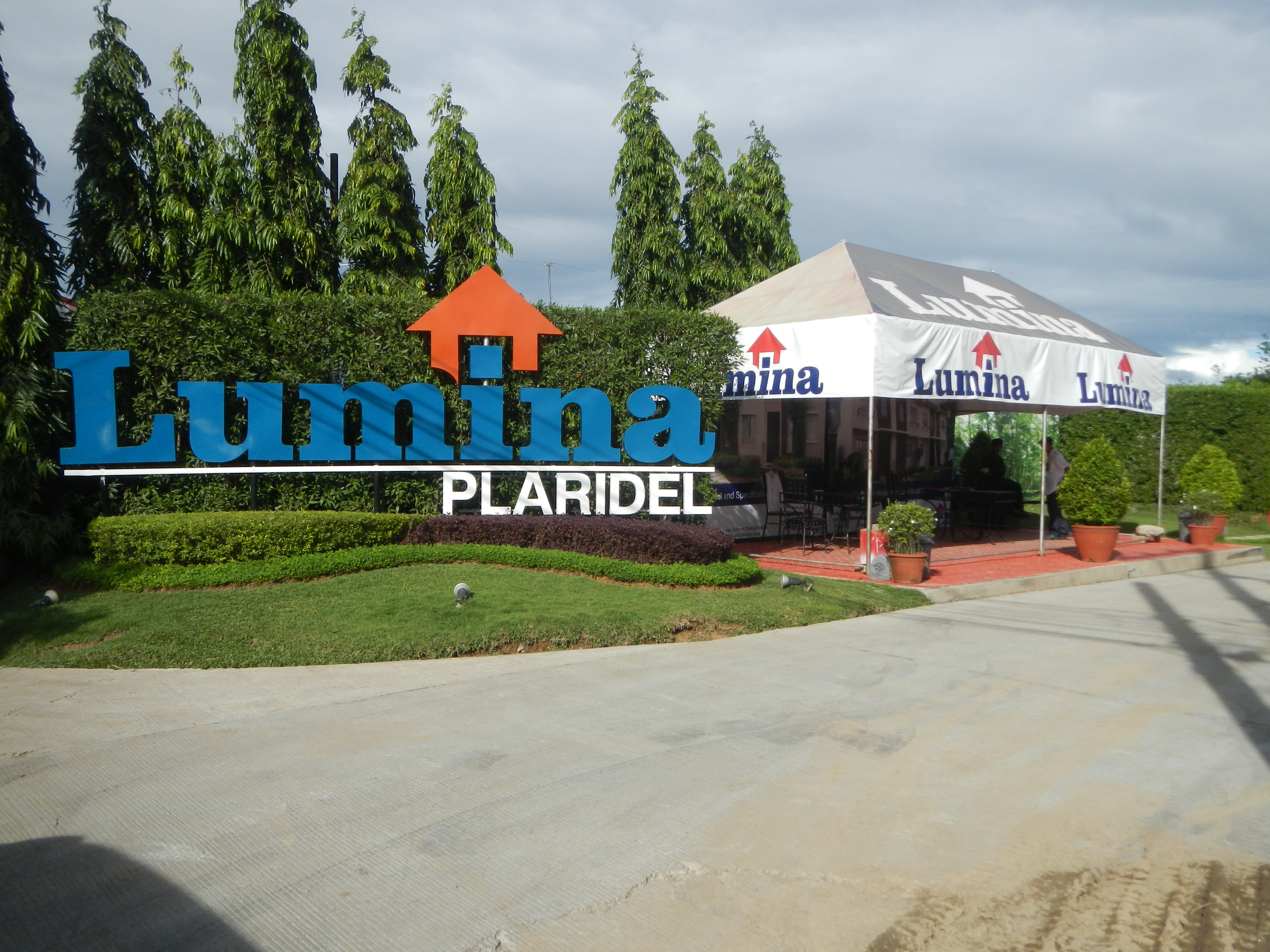
Entrance to Lumina Homes Plaridel

== See also ==
- List of renamed cities and municipalities in the Philippines
