= Plaridel Airport =

Plaridel Airport Paliparan ng Plaridel
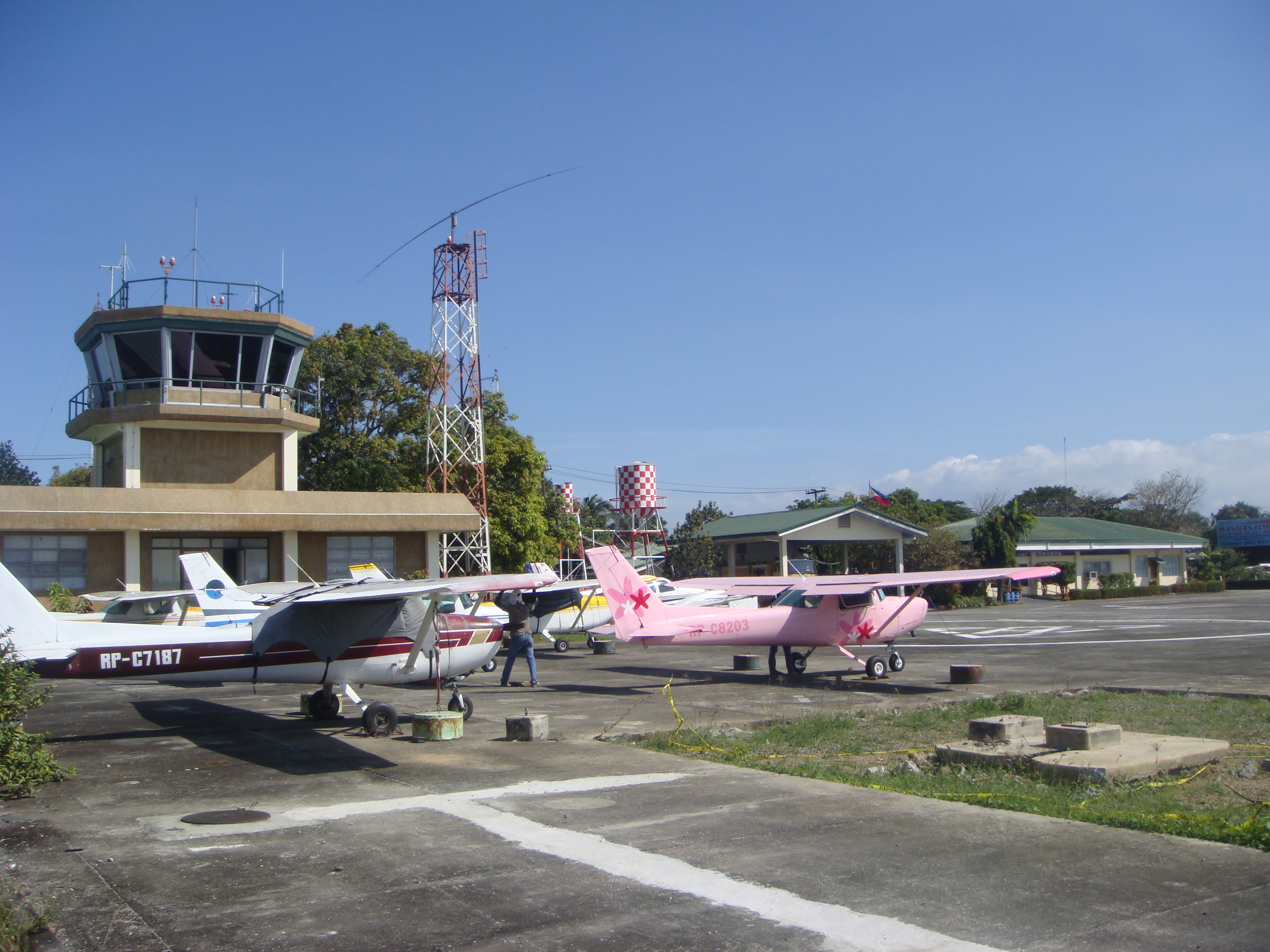
- Control tower of the Airport, parked planes and aviation schools
- IATA: none; ICAO: RPUX

Summary
- Airport type: Public
- Operator: Civil Aviation Authority of the Philippines
- Serves: Plaridel, Bulacan
- Location: Barangay Lumang Bayan, Plaridel, Bulacan
- Opened: 1935; 91 years ago
- Elevation AMSL: 6 m / 19 ft
- Coordinates: 14°53′26.40″N 120°51′9.80″E

Map

Runways
Direction	Length		Surface
Direction	m	ft	Surface
17/35	900	2,953	Asphalt

Plaridel Airport (Filipino: Paliparan ng Plaridel) (ICAO: RPUX) is an airport serving the general area of Plaridel, located in the province of Bulacan in the Philippines. The Civil Aviation Authority of the Philippines, a body of the Department of Transportation that is responsible for the operations for 81 out of 85 government-owned airports, manages the facility and classifies it as a community airport.

It is the only public airport in the Mega Manila area solely dedicated to general aviation. Among community airports it is one of the few which has taxiways that extend to the ends of a runway.

== History ==
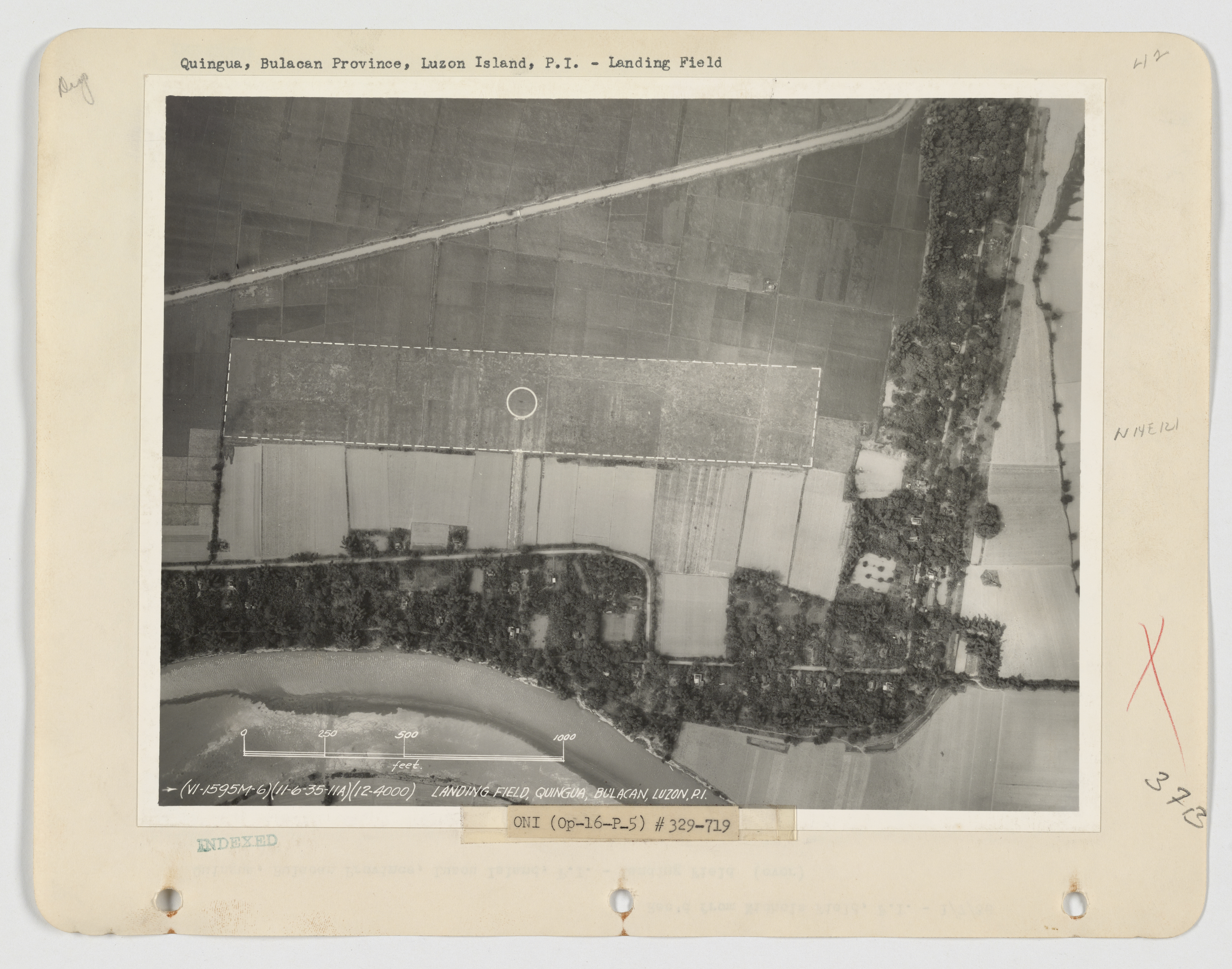
Plaridel airfield, undated image

The airport was opened in 1935 and was extensively used during World War II, when it was used as a ground for training fighter pilots.

Today, the airport is still used extensively as a training facility for all types of pilots, whether civil, commercial or military. Several aviation schools are found within the immediate vicinity of the airport. The airport is also a popular landing site for amateur pilots and aviation enthusiasts.

The airport is recognized as a historical landmark — one of the few airports in the Philippines with such a designation.

== Incidents and accidents ==
- On July 9, 2007, two Cessna 150s belonging from WCC Aviation School and Phoenix Aviation School respectively collided over Purok Ilang-Ilang, Barangay Ligas, Malolos while both aircraft were on their way to Ninoy Aquino International Airport. The crash killed an instructor and a student from the first aircraft and an Indian student in the second aircraft.
- On March 17, 2018, ten people, including all five passengers and crew on the aircraft and a further five people on the ground, were killed after a Piper PA-23 Apache crashed into a residential area near the airport shortly after takeoff.
- On September 17, 2021, a Cessna 152 plane with two pilots crashed in a vacant lot near the airport. Both pilots were injured, but managed to survive the crash.
- On February 10, 2024, a Cessna 152 plane made a safe emergency landing due to engine failure in a Malolos paddy field, southwest of North Luzon Expressway. The CAAP found that the Fliteline Aviation operated general aviation airplane carried an aircraft pilot and student pilot from Plaridel, Bulacan to Subic, Zambales in a touch-go flight training.
- On July 13, 2024, a Cessna 152 plane overshot the runway and collided with the perimeter fence and a residential property, injuring a pilot.
