= Cavite =

Province in Calabarzon, Philippines

Cavite Kabite
- Province
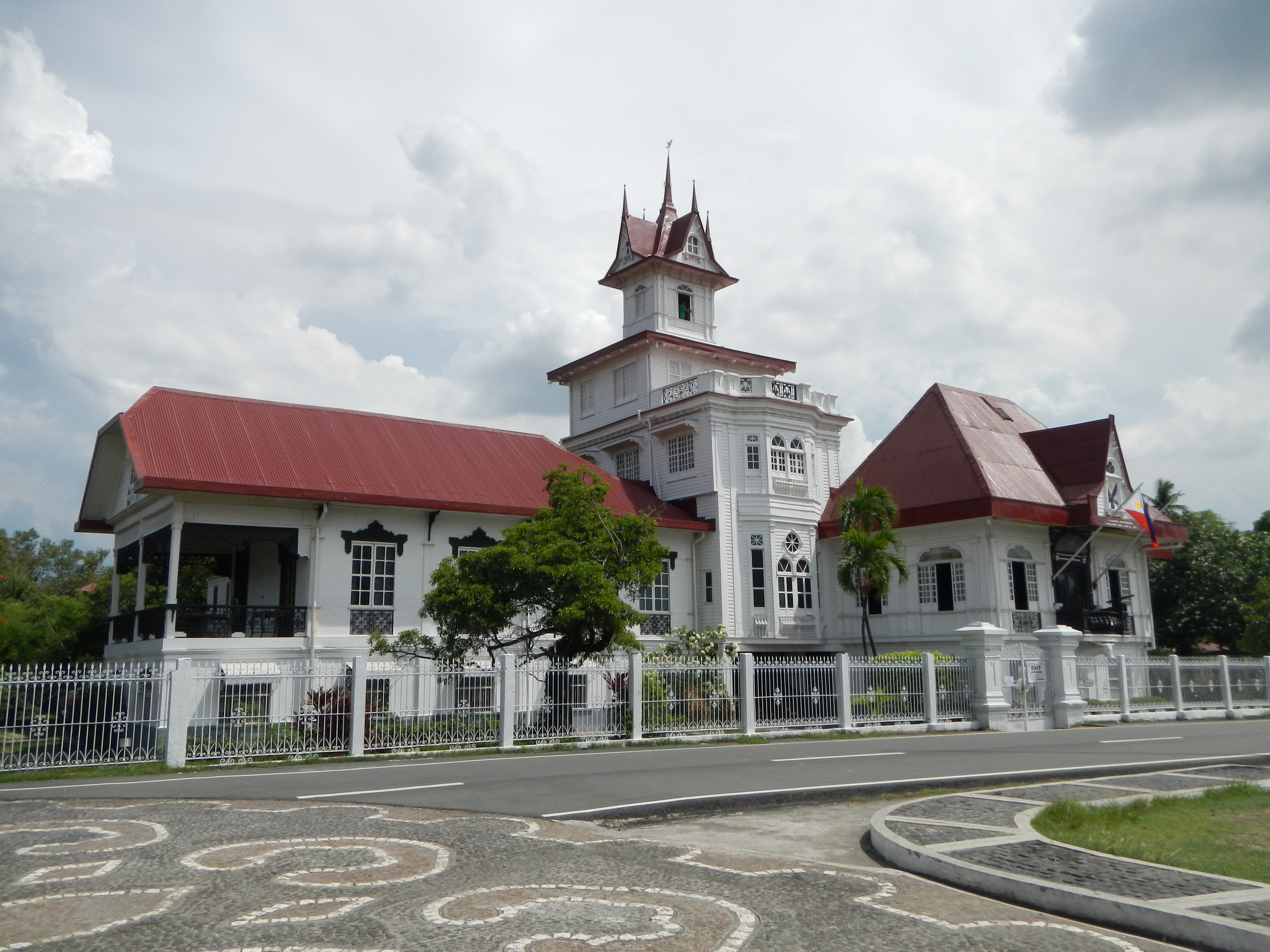
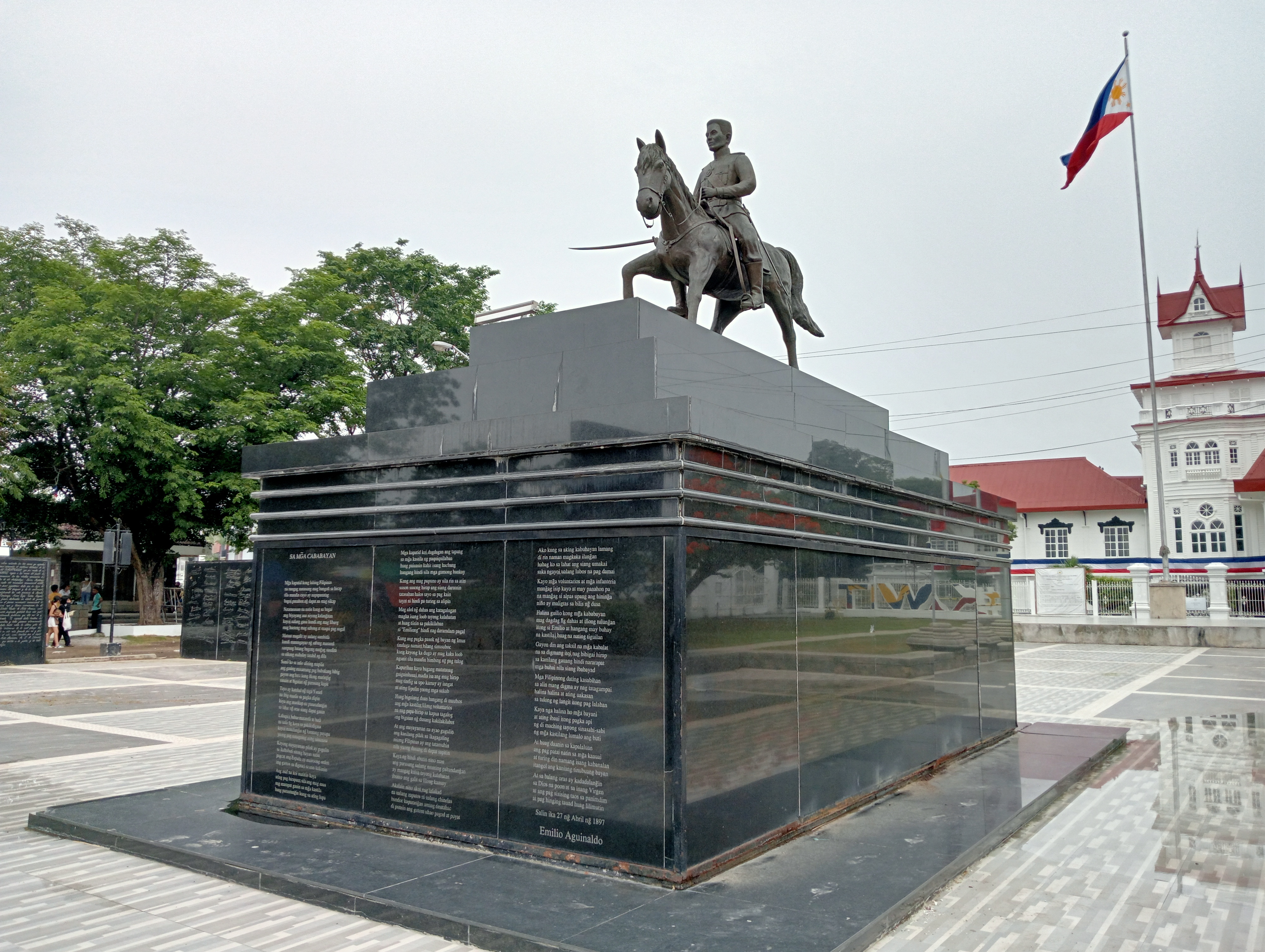
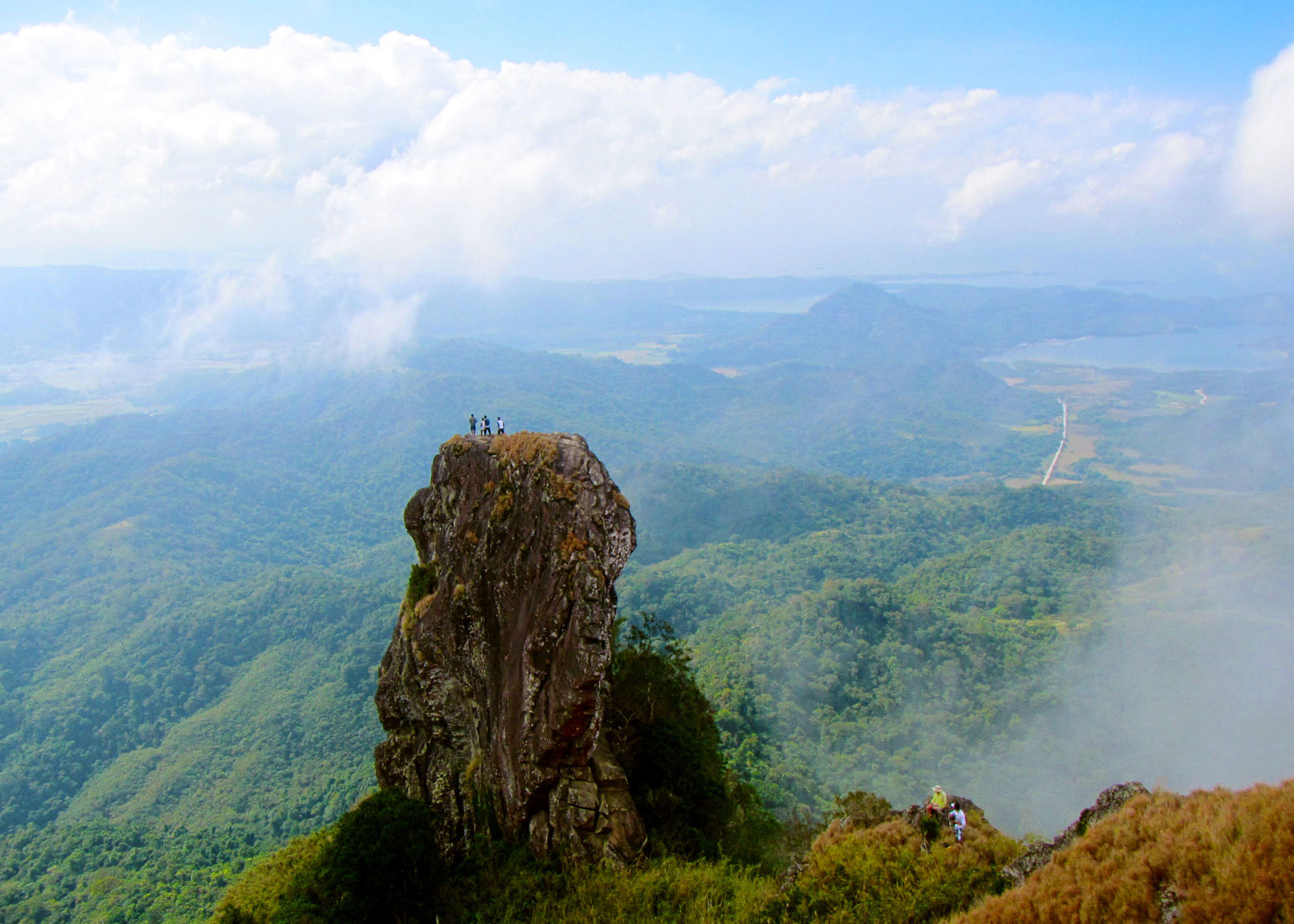
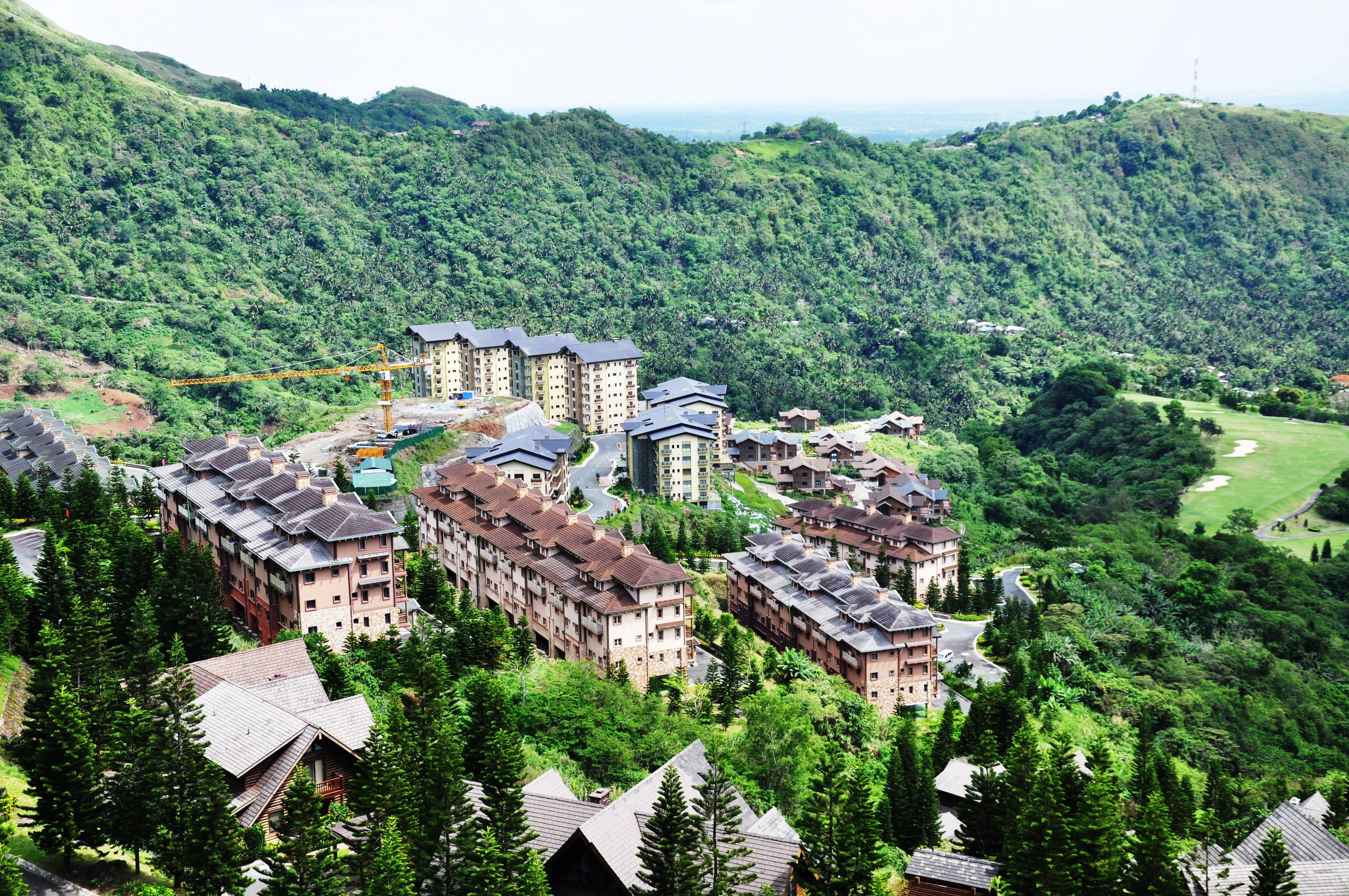
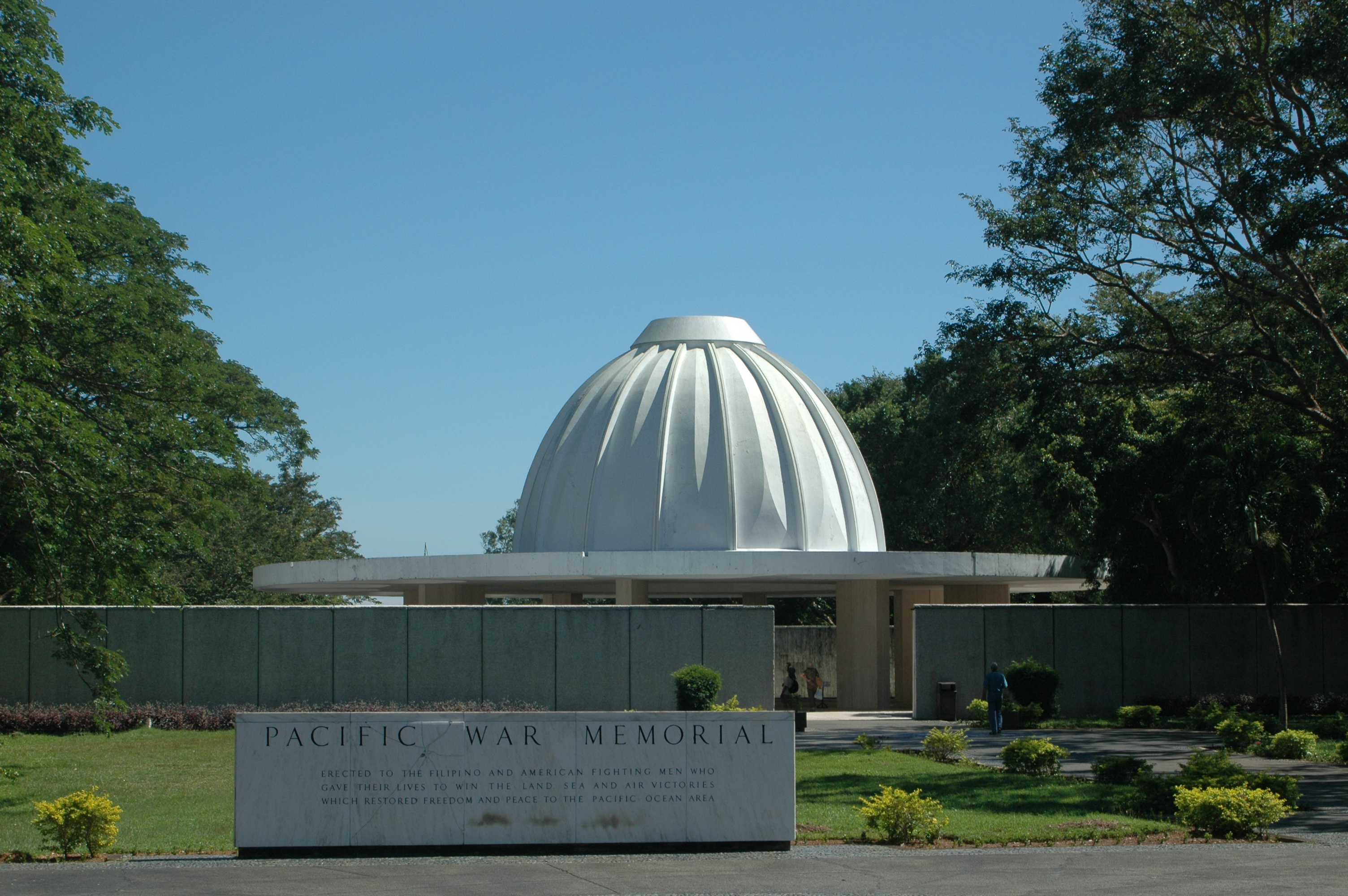
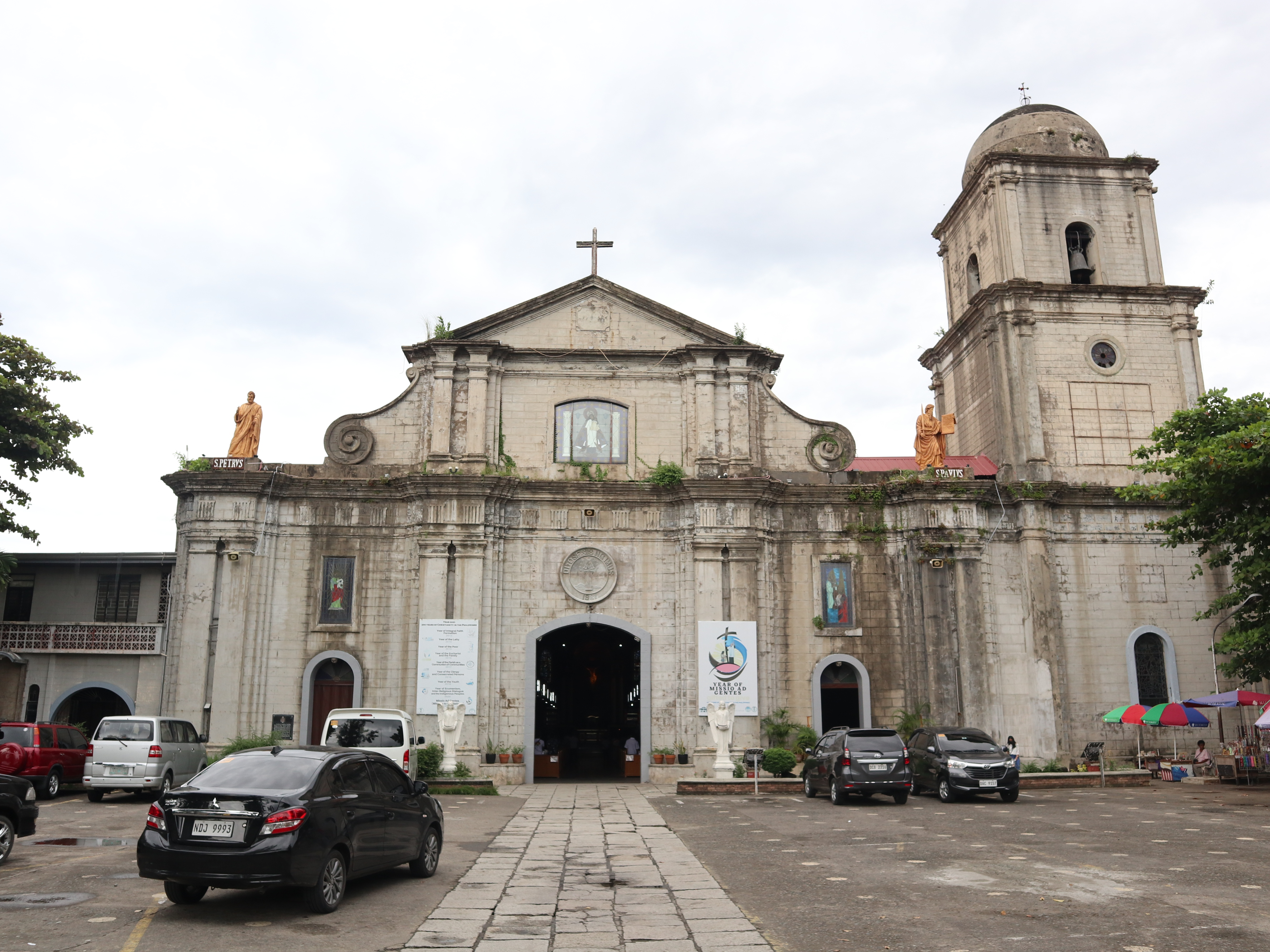
- Left to right, top to bottom (from the top): Aguinaldo Shrine, Emilio Aguinaldo Monument, monolith of Mount Pico de Loro, Tagaytay Highlands, Pacific War Memorial in Corregidor, Imus Cathedral

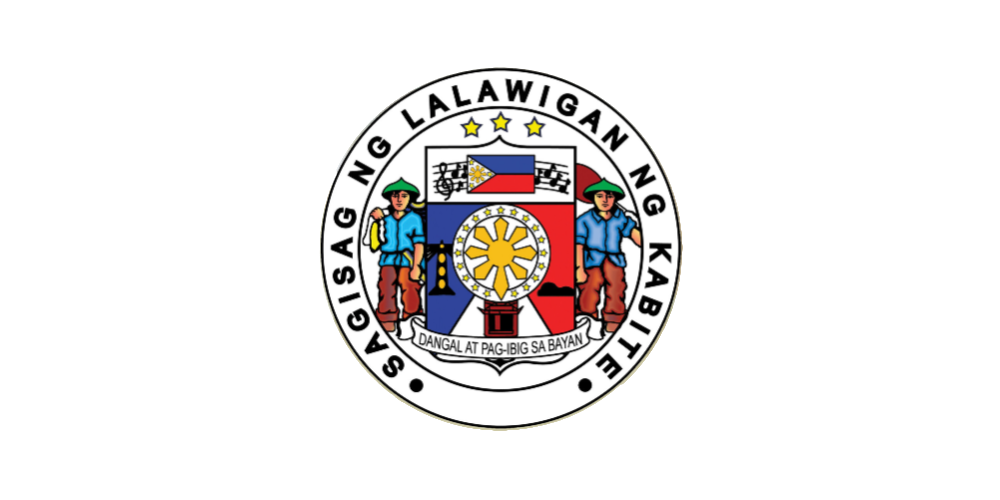
- Flag Seal
- Nickname: Historical Capital of the Philippines
- Motto(s): Dangal at Pag-ibig sa Bayan "Honor and Love for Country"
- Anthem: Himno ng Kabite "Hymn of Cavite"
- Location in the Philippines
- Interactive map of Cavite
- Coordinates: 14°16′N 120°52′E
- Country: Philippines
- Region: Calabarzon
- Established: 1614
- Capital: Imus
- Government seat: Trece Martires (Note: Although Imus is designated as the official (de jure) provincial capital of Cavite, the seat of the provincial government (de facto) remains in Trece Martires. Imus became the capital on June 11, 1977, when President Ferdinand Marcos issued the Presidential Decree No. 1163 to the transfer of the capital from Trece Martires. However, Trece Martires continues to host the majority of Cavite's provincial government offices and several national government agencies.)
- Largest city: Dasmariñas

Government
  - Type: Sangguniang Panlalawigan
  - Governor: Francisco Gabriel D. Remulla (NUP)
  - Vice Governor: Ramon Vicente H. Bautista (Lakas)
  - Legislature: Cavite Provincial Board
  - Electorate: 2,447,362 voters (2025)

Area
  - Total: 1,574.17 km^{2} (607.79 sq mi)
  - Land: 1,426.06 km^{2} (550.60 sq mi)
  - Rank: 67th out of 82
- Highest elevation (Mount Sungay): 709 m (2,326 ft)

Population (2024 census)
  - Total: 4,573,884
  - Rank: 1st out of 82
  - Density: 3,207.36/km^{2} (8,307.02/sq mi)
  - Rank: 2nd out of 82
  - Households: 1,096,120
- Demonym(s): Caviteño or Kabitenyo (masculine or neutral); Caviteña or Kabitenya (feminine)

Divisions
  - Independent cities: 0
  - Component cities: 8: Bacoor; Carmona; Cavite City; Dasmariñas; General Trias; Imus; Tagaytay; Trece Martires
  - Municipalities: 15: Alfonso; Amadeo; General Emilio Aguinaldo; General Mariano Alvarez; Indang; Kawit; Magallanes; Maragondon; Mendez; Naic; Noveleta; Rosario; Silang; Tanza; Ternate
  - Barangays: 829
  - Districts: Legislative districts of Cavite

Economy
  - Income class: 1st provincial income class
  - Poverty incidence: 4.3% (2023)
  - Revenue: ₱ 7,308 million (2024)
  - Assets: ₱ 26,770 million (2024)
  - Expenditure: ₱ 2,256 million (2024)
  - Liabilities: ₱ 4,728 million (2024)
- Time zone: UTC+8 (PHT)
- PSGC: 042100000
- IDD : area code: +63 (0)46 +63 (0)2 (Bacoor)
- ISO 3166 code: PH-CAV
- Ethnic groups: Tagalog (85%); Others (8%); Bisaya (5%); Bicolano (3%)
- Native languages: Tagalog; Chavacano
- Spoken languages: (Major language); Filipino; English (Minor language); Bicolano; Cebuano; Ilocano; Hiligaynon; Waray; Tausug; Maranao; Kapampangan; Maguindanaon
- Major religions: Roman Catholicism; Aglipayan Church; Episcopal Church; Protestantism; Eastern Orthodoxy; Islam; Confucianism; Buddhism; Taoism; Hinduism (since the 9th century); Sikhism
- Feast date: 2nd and 3rd Sunday of November
- Ecclesiastical dioceses: Diocese of Imus (Roman Catholic); Diocese of Cavite (Aglipayan Church); Diocese of Central Philippines (Episcopal Church); Diocese of the Philippines and Vietnam (Eastern Orthodoxy)
- Patron saint: Our Lady of Solitude of Porta Vaga
- Website: www.cavite.gov.ph

Cavite, (Note: Tagalog pronunciation: [kɐˈbiː.tɛ]) officially the Province of Cavite, (Note: Filipino/Tagalog: Lalawigan ng Kabite/Cavite) is a province of the Philippines located in the Calabarzon region. Situated in the southern shores of Manila Bay, it is one of the most industrialized and fastest-growing provinces in the country. Its capital is Imus, though the primary provincial government institutions are located in Trece Martires. Dasmariñas is the largest city in the province.

The province holds major historical significance, with most of the Philippine Revolution taking place in several areas of Cavite. The revolution ultimately led to the renouncement Spanish colonial control, culminating in the Philippine Declaration of Independence on June 12, 1898 in the town of Kawit. The old provincial capital, Cavite City, also hosted docks for the Manila galleon, becoming an essential part of commerce between Asia and Latin America at the time.

== Etymology ==
"Cavite" comes from cavit or cauit as u and v used to be interchangeable. The word cauit itself is the Hispanicized form of kawit (alternatively kalawit), Tagalog for "hook", in reference to the small hook-shaped peninsula jutting out to Manila Bay. The name originally applied to the peninsula, Cavite La Punta (now Cavite City) and the adjacent lowland coastal area of Cavite Viejo (now Kawit, reverting to the original native spelling). The peninsula was also known in the pre-colonial era as Tangway, from Tagalog for "peninsula".

Edmund Roberts, in his 1821 memoir, stated that the "natives" called it Caveit due to the "crooked point of land extending into the sea".

== History ==
=== Early history ===
The present Cavite City was once a mooring place for Chinese junks that came to trade with the settlements around Manila Bay. The land was formerly known as "Tangway". Archeological evidence in coastal areas shows prehistorical settlements.

=== Spanish colonial period ===
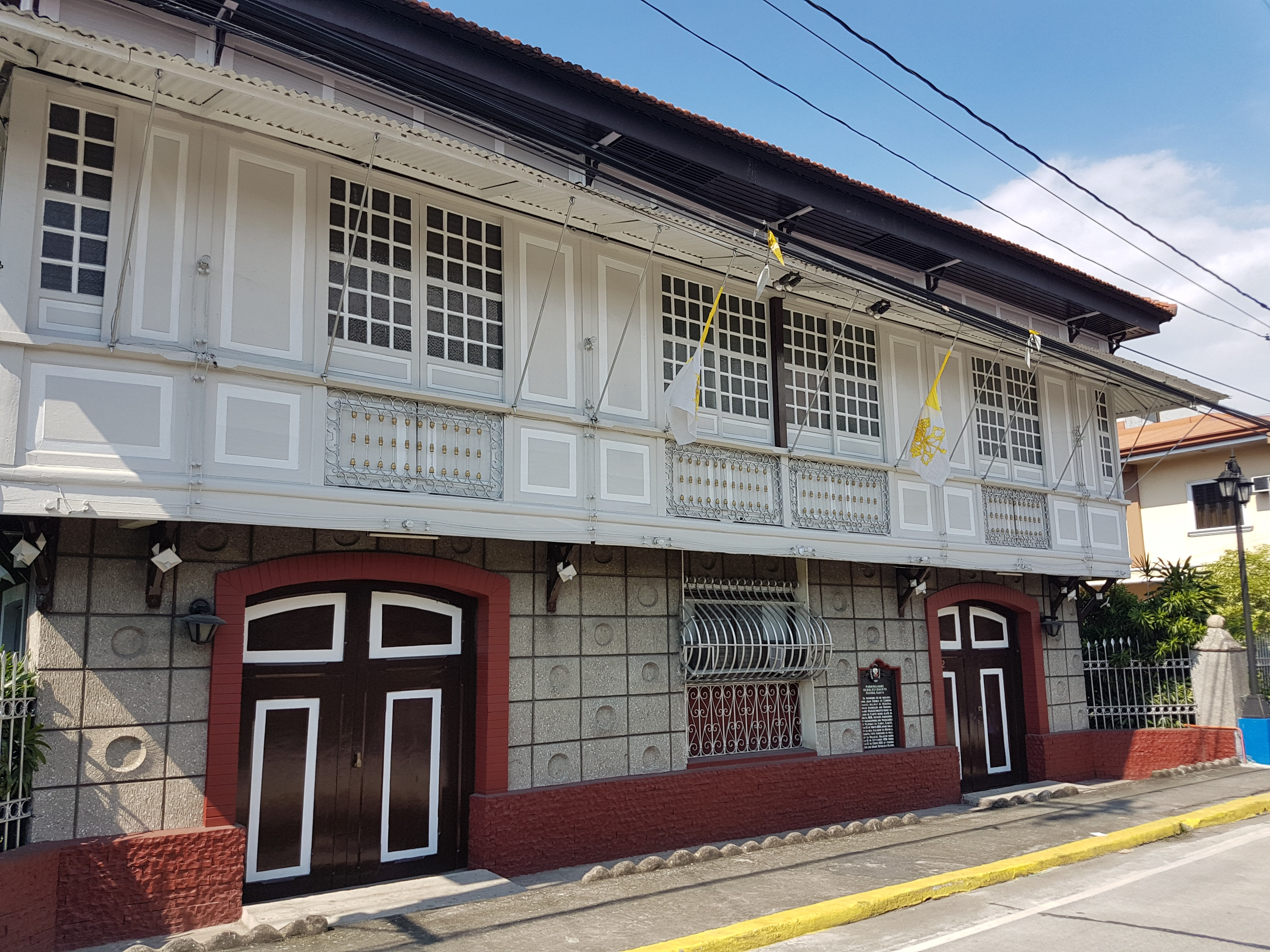
Cuenca Ancestral house in Bacoor, Cavite

Spanish colonizers who arrived in the late 16th century saw the unusual tongue of land jutting out on Manila Bay and saw its deep waters as the main staging ground where they could launch bulky galleons. It would later become the most important port linking the colony to the outside world through the Manila-Acapulco Galleon trade. In 1571, Spanish colonizers established the port and City of Cavite and fortified the settlement as a first line of defense for the city of Manila.

Of the Spanish and Mexican conquistadors who came with the Miguel Lopez de Legazpi expedition, Miguel López de Legazpi was the first one awarded with an Encomienda, with Cavite and adjacent coastal settlements being entrusted to him; although no precise figures survive.

Galleons were built and fitted at the port and many Chinese merchants settled in the communities of Bacoor and Kawit, opposite the Spanish city to trade silks, porcelain and other oriental goods.

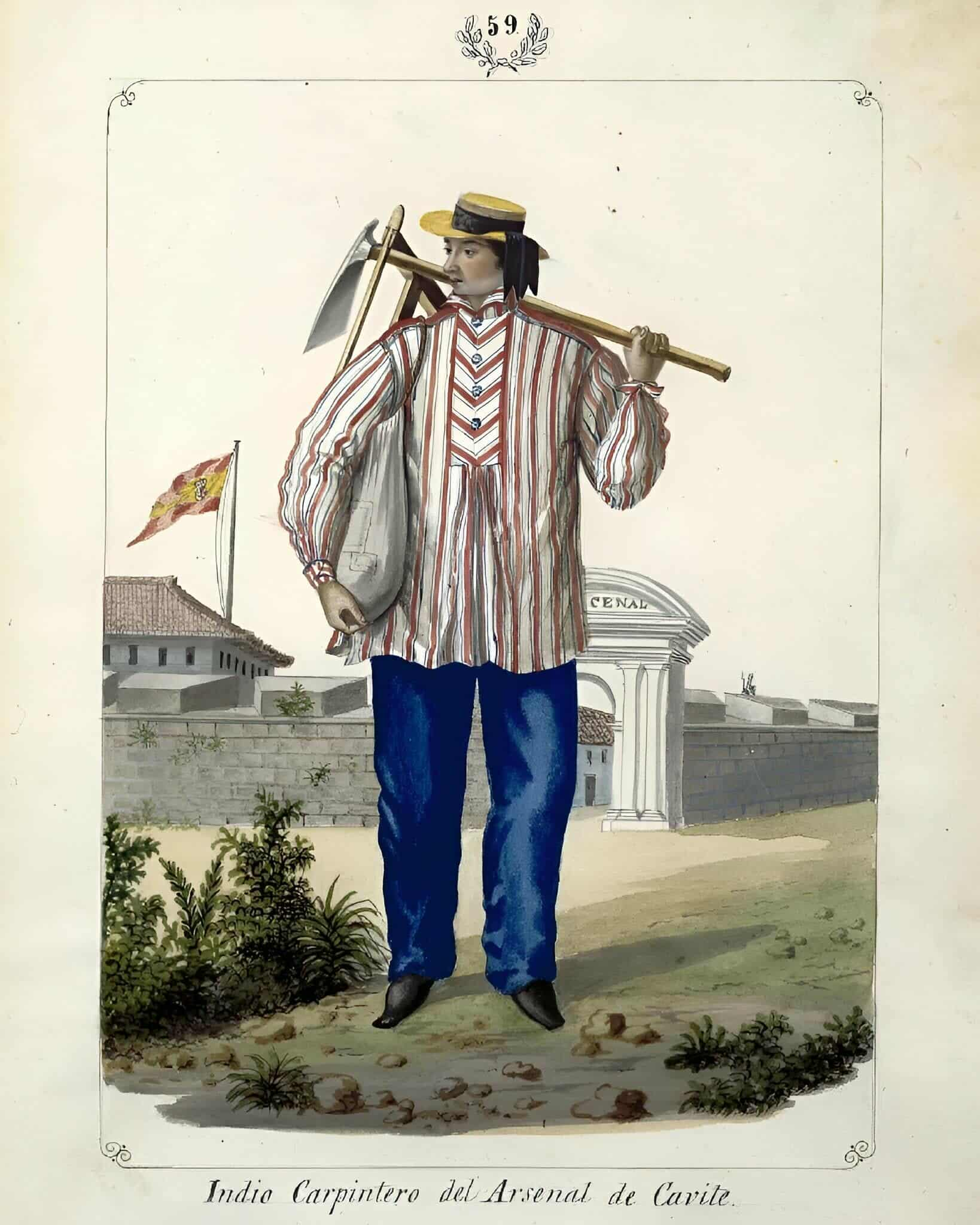
Native arsenal carpenter of Cavite.

"A defensive curtained wall was constructed the length of Cavite's western side," beginning from the entrance, "La Estanzuela", and continuing to the end of the peninsula, "Punta de Rivera", with the eastern shore unprotected by a wall. Cavite contained government offices, churches, mission buildings, Spanish homes, Fort San Felipe and the Rivera de Cavite shipyard. Docks were in place to construct galleons and galleys, but without a dry dock, ships were repaired by careening along the beach.

Fort San Felipe, La Fuerza de San Felipe, was built between 1609 and 1616. This quadrilateral structure of curtained walls, with bastions at the corners, contained 20 cannons facing the seashore. Three infantry companies, 180 men each, plus 220 Pampangan infantry, garrisoned the fort.

The galleons Espiritu Santo and San Miguel, plus six galleys were constructed between 1606 and 1616. From 1729 to 1739, "the main purpose of the Cavite shipyard was the construction and outfitting of the galleons for the Manila to Acapulco trade run."

The vibrant mix of traders, Spanish seamen from Spain and its Latin-American colonies, as well as local residents, gave rise to the use of pidgin Spanish called Chabacano. A great number of Mexican men had settled at Cavite, spread throughout Luzon, and had integrated with the local Philippine population. Some of these Mexicans became Tulisanes (Bandits) that led peasant revolts against Spain. Mexicans weren't the only Latin Americans in Cavite, as there were also a fair number of other Latin Americans, one such was the Puerto Rican, Alonso Ramirez, who became a sailor in Cavite, and published the first Latin American novel called "Infortunios de Alonso Ramirez" The years: 1636, 1654, 1670, and 1672; saw the deployment of 70, 89, 225, and 211 Latin-American soldiers from Mexico at Cavite.

In 1614, the politico-military jurisdiction of Cavite was established. As with many other provinces organized during the Spanish colonial era, Cavite City, the name of the capital, was applied to the whole province, Cavite. The province covered all the present territory except for the town of Maragondon, which used to belong to the Corregimiento of Mariveles. Maragondon was ceded to Cavite in 1754 when Bataan province was created from Pampanga province. Within Maragondon is a settlement established in 1660 by Christian Papuan exiles brought in by the Jesuits from Ternate in the Maluku Islands, and named this land Ternate after their former homeland.

Owing to its military importance, Cavite had been attacked by foreigners in their quest to conquer Manila and the Philippines. The Dutch made a surprise attack on the city in 1647, pounding the port incessantly, but were repulsed. In 1762, the British occupied the port during their two-year control in the Philippines.

In the 17th century, encomiendas (Spanish Royal land grants) were given in Cavite and Maragondon to Spanish conquistadores and their families. By the end of the 1700s, Cavite was the main port of Manila and was a province of 5,724 native families and 859 Spanish Filipino families. The 1818 Spanish census showed that Cavite had a large number of Spanish-Filipino families. Of which, these are the number of Spanish-Filipino families and their places of residency: 125 at Imus, 6 at Silang, 36 at Indan, 3 at Pueblo y Hacienda de Naic, 3 at Santa Cruz de Malabon, 69 at San Francisco de Malabon, 19 at Bacoor, 55 at Cavite Viejo, 443 at San Roque, and finally, 153 families at Plaza o Puerto de Cavite.

The religious orders began acquiring these lands, with some donated, enlarging vast haciendas (estates) in Cavite during the 18th and 19th centuries, enriching themselves. These haciendas became the source of bitter conflicts between the friar orders and Filipino farmers and pushed a number of Caviteños to live as outlaws. This opposition to the friar orders was an important factor that drove many Cavite residents to support reform, and later, independence.

In 1872, Filipinos launched their revolt against Spain. Three Filipino priests—Jose Burgos, Mariano Gomez and Jacinto Zamora—were implicated in the Cavite mutiny when 200 Filipinos staged a rebellion within Spanish garrisons. On August 28, 1896, when the revolution against Spain broke out, Cavite became a bloody theater of war. Led by Emilio Aguinaldo, Caviteños made lightning raids on Spanish headquarters, and soon liberated the entire province through the Battle of Alapan. Aguinaldo commanded the Revolution to its successful end – the proclamation of the First Republic of the Philippines on June 12, 1898, in Kawit.

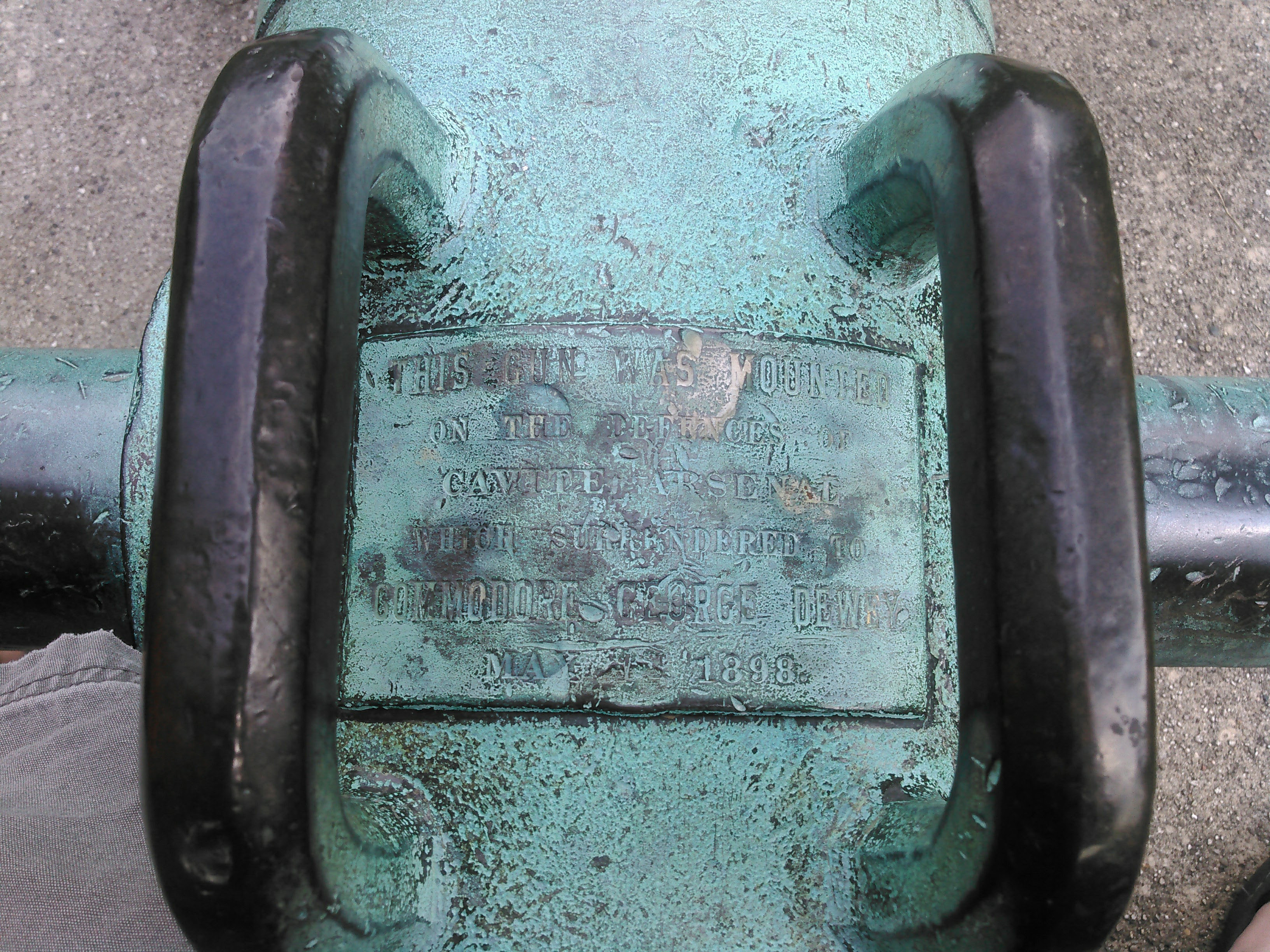
A marker affixed to the Cavite cannon in Winnetka, Illinois, USA that reads "This gun was mounted on the defences of Cavite arsenal which was surrendered to Commodore George Dewey"

During the Spanish–American War, American forces attacked the Spanish squadron in Cavite. The Spanish defeat marked the end of Spanish rule in the country. A captured Spanish cannon from the Cavite arsenal now sits in Village Green Park in Winnetka, Illinois, United States of America.

=== Japanese occupation ===
In May 1942, after the fall of Bataan and Corregidor Island, the Japanese Imperial forces occupied Cavite and made their presence felt in each town of the province and Cavite City itself, as well as in the young city of Tagaytay established in the 1930s.

After surviving the Bataan Death March and released from Capas, Tarlac concentration camp United States Army Forces in the Far East (USAFFE) Col. Mariano Castañeda, returned to Cavite and secretly organized the guerilla forces in the province.

The Japanese authorities pressured him to accept the position as Provincial Governor of Cavite, he refused many times over until his excuses did not work, much against his will he was forced to accept the position by the Japanese, and by thinking that it would be beneficial to further organize the resistance movement as Governor by day and a guerilla commander by night. Eventually, the Japanese discovered his guerilla connection and raided his house in the attempt to capture him, but he escaped along with Col. Lamberto Javalera by swimming the Imus river up to Salinas, Bacoor and finally joined his comrades in the field in Neneng, the General Headquarters of the Fil American Cavite Guerilla Forces (FACGF) located in Dasmariñas.

At this time due to his organizational skills the FACGF raised a regiment in each of the administrative units and also created attached special battalions. Overall, three special battalions, one medical battalion, one signal company, one hospital unit, and Division GHQ and Staff were raised to provide administrative and combat support. Later on, the FACGF, with a peak of 14,371 Enlisted Men and 1,245 officers, grew into a formidable force to take on the omnipresent rule of the Japanese in the province. At its peak the force contained 14 infantry regiments:

- 1st Infantry Regiment, Imus (Col. Lorenzo Saulog)
- 2nd Infantry Regiment, Bacoor (Col. Francisco Guererro)
- 3rd Infantry Regiment, Silang (Col. Dominador Kiamson)
- 4th Infantry Regiment, Dasmariñas (Col. Estanislao Mangubat Carungcong)
- 5th Infantry Regiment, Barangay Anabu, Imus (Col. Raymundo Paredes)
- 6th Infantry Regiment, Cavite City (Col. Amado Soriano)
- 7th Infantry Regiment, Alfonso (Col. Angeles Hernais)
- 8th Infantry Regiment, Naic (Col. Emilio Arenas)
- 9th Infantry Regiment, Mendez (Col. Maximo Rodrigo)
- 10th Infantry Regiment Kawit (Col. Hugo Vidal)
- 11th Infantry Regiment Imus (Col. Maximo Reyes)
- 12th Infantry Regiment, Amadeo (Col. Daniel Mediran)
- 13th Infantry Regiment, Rosario (Col. Ambrosio Salud)
- 14th Infantry Regiment, Brgy. Paliparan, Dasmariñas (Col. Emiliano De La Cruz)

On January 31, 1945, the liberation of the province of Cavite started with the combined forces of the American 11th Airborne Division under General Joseph Swing and Col. Harry Hildebrand and the valiant Caviteño guerilleros of the Fil-American Cavite Guerilla Forces, which liberated the province of Cavite from the Japanese occupiers, and protected at all costs the National Highway 17 (Aguinaldo Highway) from Tagaytay City to Las Piñas that serve as the vital supply route of the U.S. 11th Airborne Division, paving the way towards the road to the bitter but victorious Battle of Manila.

=== Philippine independence ===
The economic growth of the country began to creep its way to the province following the end of the Second World War and the restoration of independence. Given its proximity to Manila, the province soon began to feel a transformation into an economic provider of food and industrial goods not just for Metro Manila but for the whole of the country. In 1954, Trece Martires was created out as a planned capital city from portions of Tanza, Indang, Naic, and General Trias. Despite the transfer of capital status to Imus in 1979, it retains many offices of the provincial government, acting thus as the de facto capital of the province. Also, Tagaytay's high location and cool temperatures would enable it to become a secondary summer capital and a vacation spot especially during the Christmas season, given its proximity to the Manila area.

The economy of Cavite remained largely agricultural during the decades after the war, from the 1940s to the 1980s, with attempts to create industrial estates in the early 1970s largely falling flat in light of the Crony Capitalism and economic crises of the late 1970s and early 1980s.

==== During the Marcos administration ====
The Philippines' gradual postwar recovery took a turn for the worse in the late 1960s and early 1970s, with the 1969 Philippine balance of payments crisis being one of the early landmark events. Economic analysts generally attribute this to the ramp-up on loan-funded government spending to promote Ferdinand Marcos’ 1969 reelection campaign, although Marcos blamed the 1968 formation of the Communist Party of the Philippines as the reason for the social unrest of the period. There were clashes between government and communist protesters in the rural areas and the western highlands of Cavite.

Another conflict faced by the Philippines throughout the last part of the 20th century had some of its roots in Cavite - the Moro conflict, which was largely sparked by outrage in the wake of exposes about the Jabidah Massacre. The exposes told the story of how a group of Moro men were recruited by the military for Operation Merdeka, Marcos' secret plan to invade Sabah and reclaim it from Malaysia, and trained them on the island of Corregidor, which is administered by Cavite province. When for various reasons the recruits decided that they no longer wanted to follow their officers' orders, their officers allegedly shot all the recruits to death, with only one survivor managing to live by feigning death. The exposes angered the Philippines' Muslim minority enough to trigger the Moro conflict, eventually leading to the creation of the Bangsamoro Autonomous Region in Muslim Mindanao (BARMM).

In 1972, one year before the expected end of his last constitutionally allowed term as president in 1973, Ferdinand Marcos placed the Philippines under martial law. This allowed Marcos to remain in power for fourteen more years, during which Cavite went through many social and economic ups and downs.

The excesses of the Marcos family prompted opposition from various Filipino citizens despite the risks of arrest and torture. Among the prominent Caviteño oppositionists were Armed Forces Colonel Bonifacio Gillego, who spoke out against human rights abuses by the military and later exposed the fact that Ferdinand Marcos had faked most of his military medals. Another was Roman Catholic Priest Fr. Joe Dizon, who led protest actions against government corruption and human rights abuses during martial law in the Philippines, political dynasties, and the pork barrel system and brought social issues to the attention of the Catholic Bishops Conference of the Philippines. Both Gillego and Dizon are honored at the Philippines' Bantayog ng mga Bayani, which honors the martyrs and heroes who fought authoritarian rule under Marcos. Other Caviteños honored there include Philippine Navy Captain Danilo Vizmanos, musician Benjie Torralba, activists Modesto "Bong" Sison, Florencio Pesquesa, and Artemio Celestial, Jr., and Nemesio Prudente who would later become president of the Polytechnic University of the Philippines.

Presidential Decree No. 1 of 1972 grouped the Provinces of the Philippines into administrative regions, and Cavite was organized into Region IV. The Luzon mainland provinces of this region - Cavite, Laguna, Batangas, Rizal, and Quezon - were prioritized for industrialization, and large amounts of agricultural land in Cavite were acquired for conversion into industrial estates throughout the 1970s and early 1980s. However, these government-owned or corporate-owned estates were unsuccessful at first, and many of them became unused lands well into the Philippine economic collapse of the early 1980s. Old Cavite residents who were primarily engaged in agriculture were displaced and left the province, replaced by a rising number of residents from the capital region.

Rosario was the first Cavite town to have several large industrial projects, including a refinery set up by FilOil Refinery Corporation. An influx of new residents into the north and west parts of Carmona led to the separation of these portions into a new town, General Mariano Alvarez, in 1981. The migration had begun in 1968, when the Carmona Resettlement Project was established under the People's Homesite and Housing Corporation (PHHC) - an effort to resettle illegal settlers from around the Quezon Memorial Park area in Quezon City. A site in Carmona was selected, and by the mid-1970s, the resettlement area soon attracted poor and middle class migrants alike from Quezon City, Manila, Makati and Parañaque. Their clamor to have a municipality of their own resulted in the creation of General Mariano Alvarez. Bacoor, given its proximity to Metro Manila, saw the building of the first residential villages during this time, providing accommodation the rising number of workers from the nearby capital.

One geographical feature of Cavite, Mount Sungay, was significantly altered in 1979 when First Lady Imelda Marcos ordered the construction of the Palace in the Sky, a mansion originally intended as a guesthouse for former California Governor Ronald Reagan (who never arrived). This drastically reduced the height of the mountain, which had once been a landmark that helped guide sailors into Manila bay. The mansion remained unfinished after the People Power Revolution in 1986 that toppled the dictatorship of President Ferdinand Marcos. The new government renamed it the People's Park in the Sky, to show the excesses of the ousted regime.

=== Contemporary ===
In 2002, Region IV was split into two parts: Region IV-A, known as Calabarzon; and Region IV-B, known as Mimaropa. Cavite was made part of Region IV-A, which is also known as the Southern Tagalog Mainland.

== Geography ==
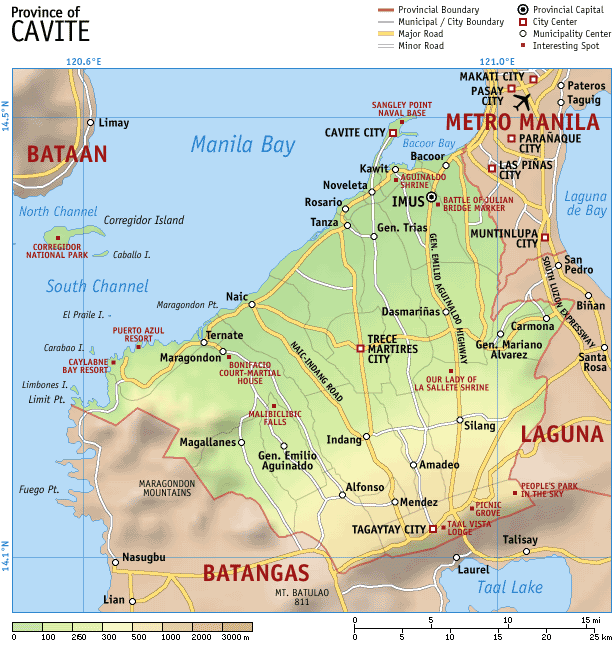
Detailed topographic map of Cavite

Cavite is surrounded by Laguna province to the east, Metro Manila to the northeast, and Batangas province to the south. To the west lies the South China Sea. It is located within the Greater Manila Area, not to be confused with adjacent Metro Manila, the defined capital region.

Cavite is the second-smallest province in the Calabarzon region, only after Rizal. Cavite occupies a land area of 1,526.28 square kilometers (589.30 sq mi), which is approximately 9.05% of Calabarzon's total land area, 3.07% of the regional area and 0.48% of the total land area of the Philippines. The municipalities of Maragondon and Silang have the biggest land areas, comprising 165.49 square kilometers (63.90 sq mi) and 156.41 square kilometers (60.39 sq mi) respectively, while the municipality of Noveleta has the smallest land area as indicated by 5.41 square kilometers (2.09 sq mi) or 0.38% of the provincial total and area.

=== Topography and slope ===
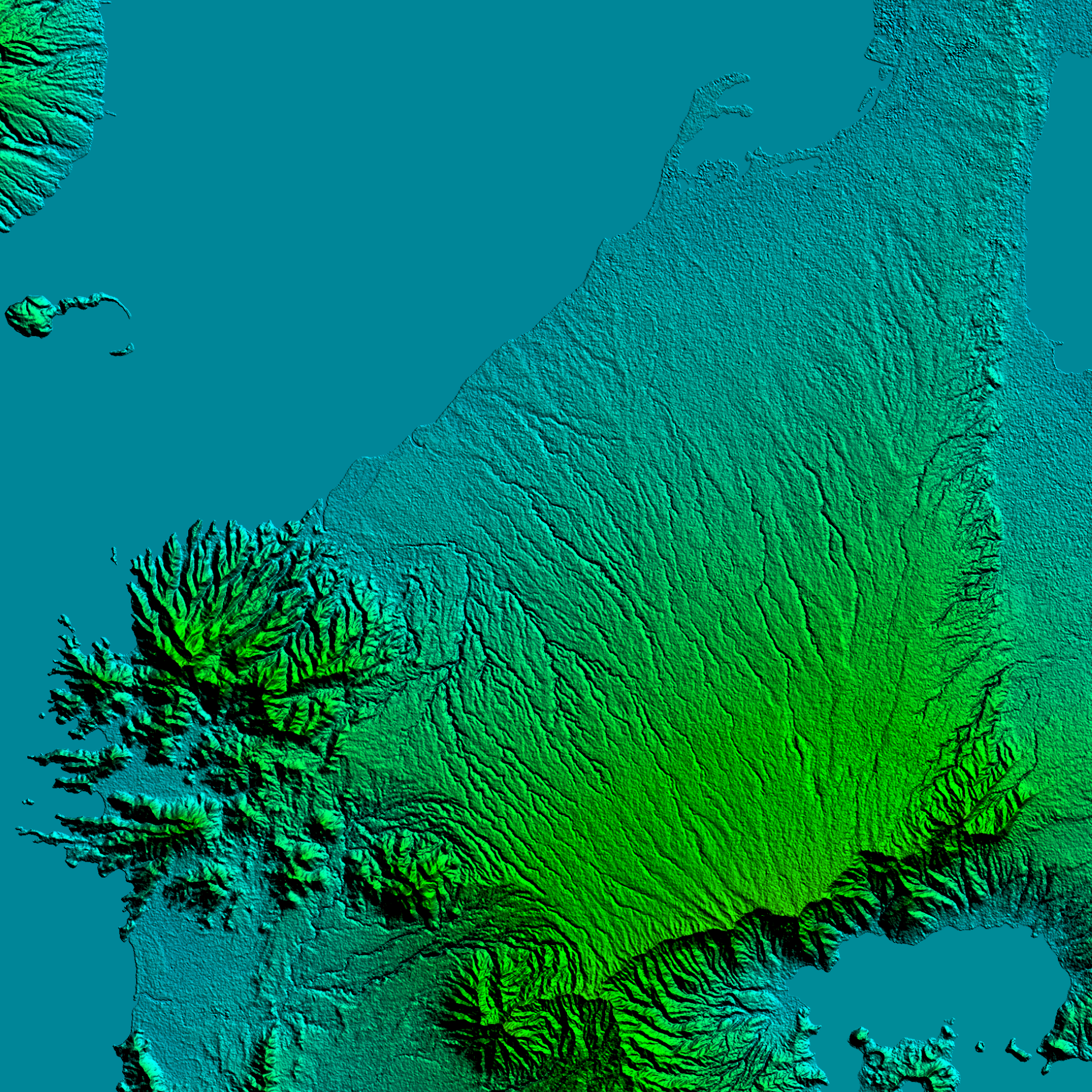
Topographic map of Cavite on 1 arc second/30-meter resolution

Situated at the entrance of Manila Bay, Cavite is characterized by rolling hinterlands punctuated by hills; a shoreline fronting Manila Bay at sea level; and a rugged portion at the boundary with Batangas where the Dos Picos mountains are located. The province has two mountain ranges.

Cavite is divided into four physiographical areas, namely: the lowest lowland area, the lowland area, the central hilly area, and the upland mountainous area.

- The lowest lowland area is the coastal plain in particular. These areas have extremely low ground level of 0 to 2 m (0.0 to 6.6 ft) elevation compared to the high tide level of about 0.8 meters (2 ft 7 in) from the mean sea level (msl). These are the cities of Cavite, Bacoor and the municipalities of Kawit, Noveleta, Rosario, northern part of Carmona and eastern part of Ternate.
- The lowland area consists of the coastal and alluvial plains. These areas have flat ground slopes of less than 0.5% and low ground elevation of 2 to 30 meters (6 ft 7 in to 98 ft 5 in). The alluvial plain can be found in the city of Imus and the southern part of General Trias. These municipalities form the transition area between the coastal plain and the central hilly area. It also covers some areas of Bacoor, Carmona, Kawit, Noveleta, Rosario, and Tanza.
- The third topography type is the central hilly area, generally found on the mountain foot slope. It forms the rolling tuffaceous plateau. This topography includes steep hills, ridges and elevated inland valley. The plateau is characterized with ground elevation ranging from 30 meters (98 ft) to nearly 400 meters (1,300 ft). Its ground slope ranges from 0.5 to 2%. The cities of Trece Martires and Dasmariñas and the municipalities of General Emilio Aguinaldo, General Mariano Alvarez, western part of Ternate, northern parts of Amadeo, Indang, Silang, Magallanes and Maragondon have this kind of topography.
- The last topography type is upland mountainous area, found in the city of Tagaytay and the municipalities of Alfonso, Mendez, southern parts of Amadeo, Indang, Silang, Magallanes and Maragondon. They are situated at a very high elevation above 400 meters (1,300 ft) with slopes of more than 2%. The Tagaytay ridge has an average elevation of 610 metres (2,000 ft) with Mount Sungay at 14°8′31.71″N 121°1′19.02″E, the highest elevation in the province at 716 meters (2,349 ft). The mountain was much higher before with an elevation of 752 meters (2,467 ft), topped by rock formations that resembled horns (Sungay in Tagalog) hence the name. The prominence of the mountain was leveled in half during the construction of People's Park in the Sky during the Marcos administration.

=== Islands ===
- Balot Island, located at the mouth of Ternate River
- Caballo Island
- Corregidor
- El Fraile Island
- Carabao Island
- La Monja Island, located west of Corregidor
- Limbones Island, located off the Maragondon coast near the Batangas border
- Pulo ni Burunggoy (now Island Cove Resort; formerly Covelandia) located in Bacoor Bay
- Santa Amalia Island, located Northwest of Corregidor

=== Land resources and distribution ===
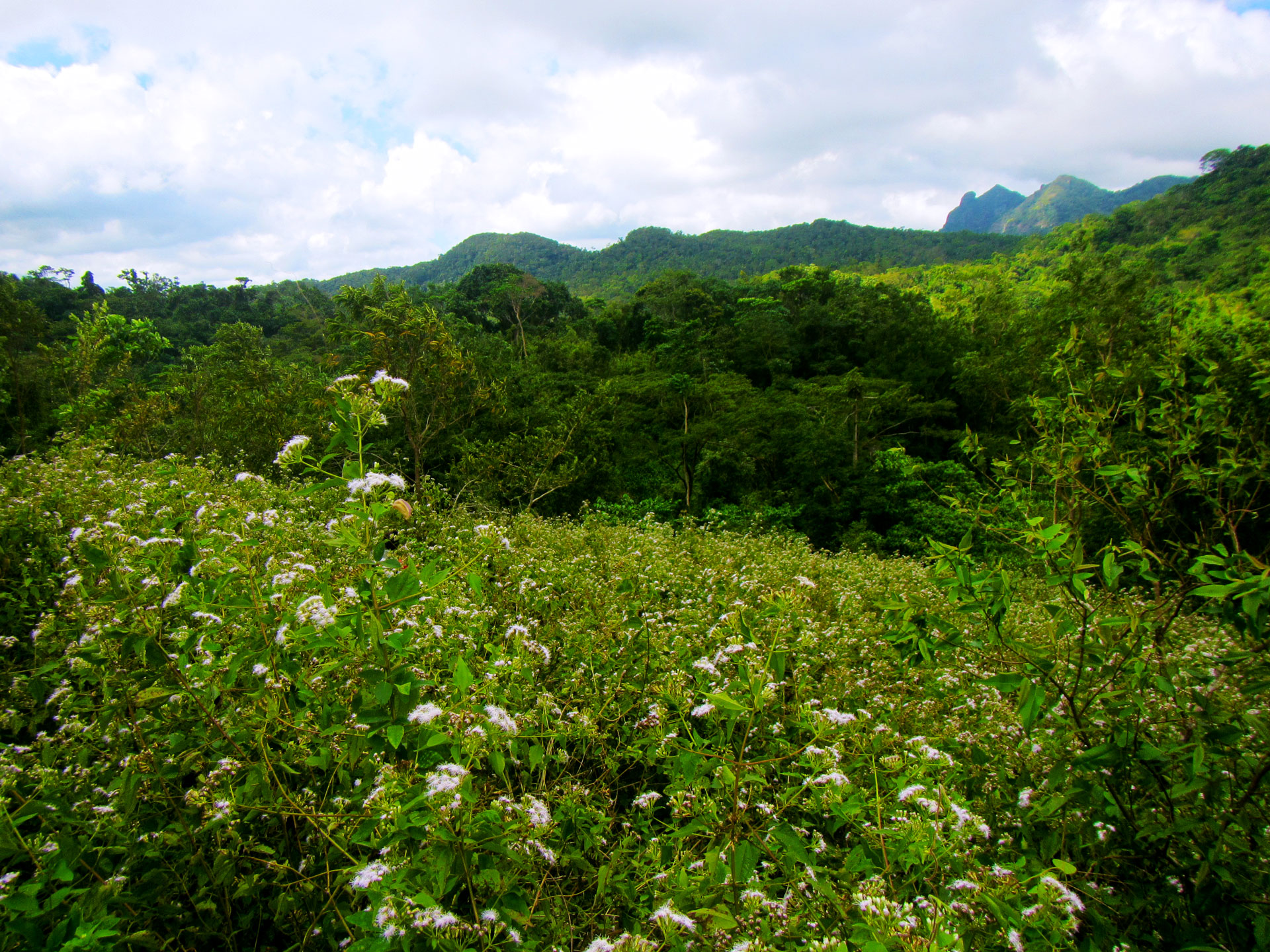
Mounts Palay-Palay–Mataas-na-Gulod Protected Landscape

Cavite's land resources are categorized into two: forest lands and alienable and disposable lands. Forest lands are being maintained as they play a great role in the ecological balance of the province aside from the fact that they are home to numerous flora and fauna that needs to be protected and preserved. Correspondingly, the alienable and disposable lands are the built-up areas as well as production areas. These lands are intended for urban, economic and demographic developments.

==== Forest lands ====
Cavite province lies in the western monsoon forest zone. This location is very beneficial for the formation of tropical rainforests, which are characteristically made through natural vegetation. In 2007, the existing forest area within the province totaled only to 8,625 hectares (21,310 acres). These forest areas were categorized as Protected Landscape under the National Integrated Protected Area System (NIPAS) and the rest, unclassified forest (Non-NIPAS). A total of 4,000 hectares (9,900 acres) are located within the Mounts Palay-Palay–Mataas-na-Gulod Protected Landscape, a protected area in Ternate and Maragondon created by Proclamation Number 1594 on October 26, 1976. The park lies at the border of Cavite and Batangas and encompasses three peaks, Palay-Palay, Pico de Loro and Mataas na Gulod. The five unclassified forests are found along Tagaytay Ridge, Maragondon, Magallanes, Ternate and Alfonso. The other mountain peaks in the province are Mt. Buntis, Mt. Nagpatong, Mt. Hulog and Mt. Gonzales (Mt. Sungay).

Cavite's forest provides an abundance of different forest products. Bamboo, a member of the grass family, is one of the most available forest products found in the municipalities of Ternate, Magallanes, Maragondon and General Aguinaldo throughout the year.

==== Alienable and disposable lands ====
These lands are being used in various ways, either for agriculture, residences, open areas, etc. Based on the Cavite Provincial Physical Framework Plan 2005–2010, Cavite's alienable and disposable lands are further classified into production lands and built-up areas. Production lands in Cavite are intended for agriculture, fishery, and mining. On the other hand, built-up areas are mainly for residential areas, commercial, industrial and tourism areas.

==== Production land-use ====
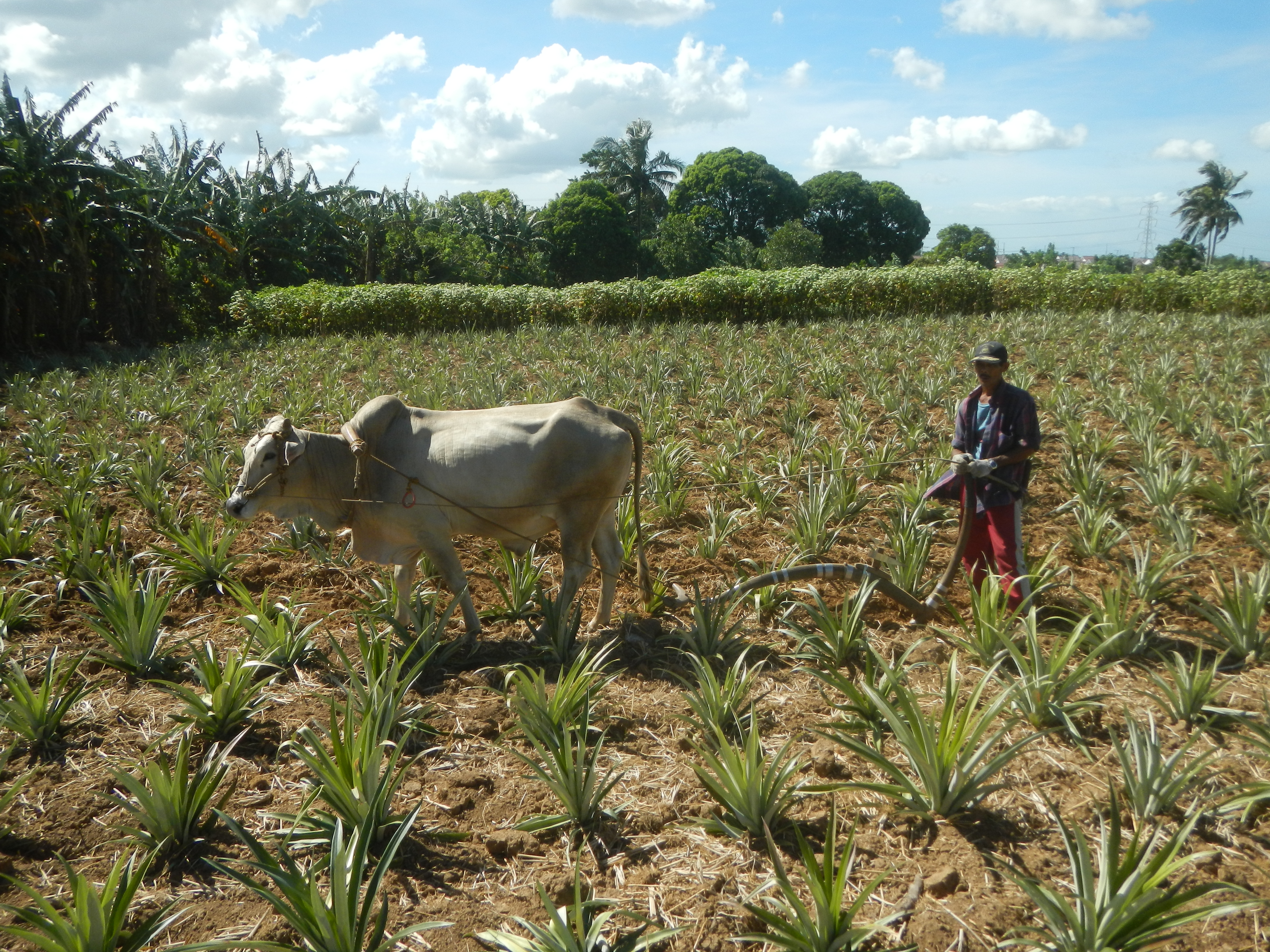
Pineapple farm in Silang

Majority of production land-use is for agriculture. Considering that 50.33% of the total provincial land area is engaged in agriculture, it can be generalized that in spite of rapid urbanization in the province, Cavite remains to have an agricultural economy that makes food security attainable. Some of the major crops being produced in the province are rice, corn, coffee, coconuts, cut flowers and vegetables.

Included in the agricultural land use are livestock farms that range from piggery, poultry, goat and cattle farms. The climatic suitability of Cavite makes the province ideal for integrated farming, having crops and livestock raising in one farm.

Fishery is also another major component of the agricultural sector. Having rich marine resources and long coastlines, the province is home to numerous fishery activities providing livelihood to many Caviteños. In some lowland and even upland areas, fishery, in the form of fish ponds are also producing a large amount of fish products. Some areas in Cavite are also engaged in fish processing and production of fish products like fish sauce.

Mining is the third component of production land-use in the province. As of 2009, there are 15 mining and quarrying areas operating in Cavite. Extraction includes filling materials, gravel, and sand.

==== Built-up areas ====
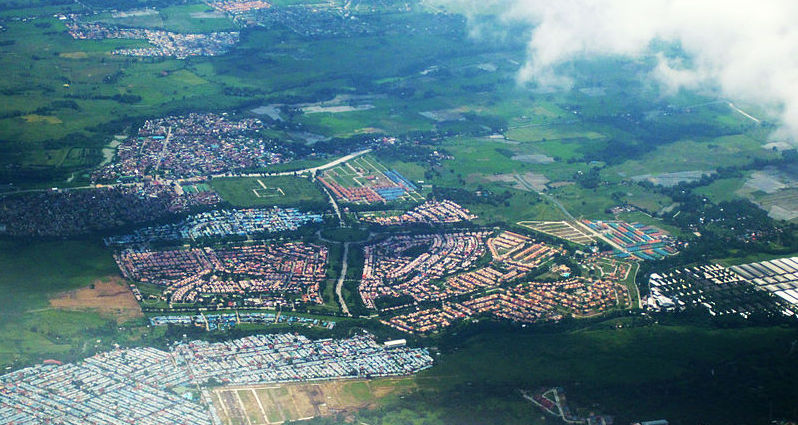
Aerial view of General Trias featuring residential developments

The built-up areas are mainly composed of residential and industrial sites. This also includes commercial and business areas where commerce is transpiring. According to the 2007 Census of Population and Housing by the Philippine Statistics Authority, there are 611,450 occupied housing units in Cavite.

Moreover, according to the Housing and Land-Use Regulatory Board, there are around 1,224 housing subdivisions with issued license to sell in the province until 2009 which occupies an area of 9,471 hectares (23,400 acres).

Meanwhile, the industrial sector also develops rapidly in the province. For 2009, operational industrial estates cover around 2,939 hectares (7,260 acres). Tourism establishments are also considered built-up areas such as golf courses, leisure farms, resorts and the likes.

=== Water resources ===
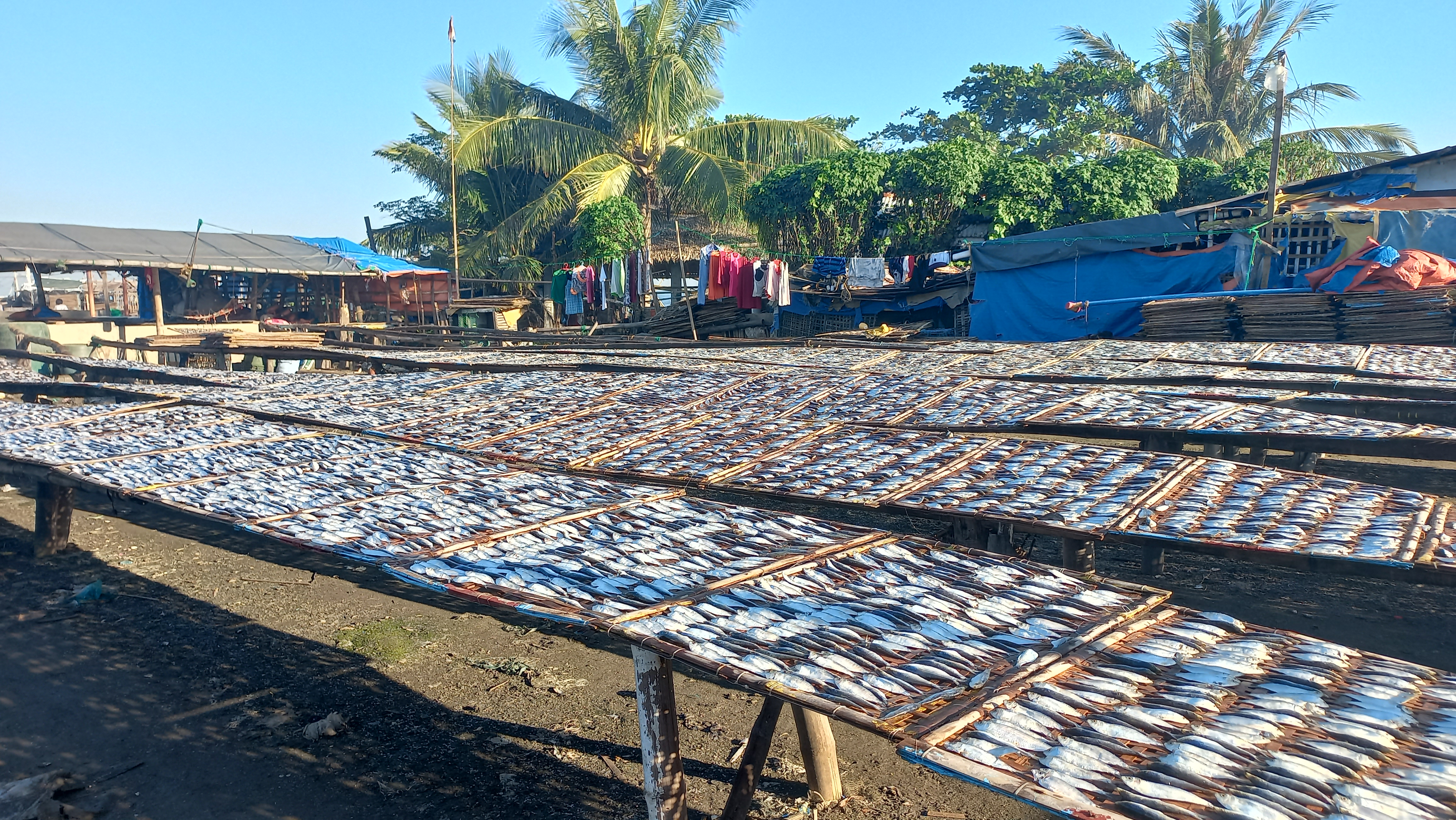
Sardines caught from the Manila Bay drying under the sun in Rosario

The hydrological network of the province is composed of seven major rivers and its tributaries. These river systems generally flows from the highlands of Tagaytay and Maragondon to Manila Bay. Numerous springs, waterfalls and rivers found in the upland areas of the province, have been developed for tourism. In the lowland areas, hundreds of artesian wells and deep wells provide water supply for both residential and irrigation purposes.

Cavite shoreline stretches about 123 kilometers (76 mi). The communities located along the coast are Cavite City, Bacoor, Kawit, Noveleta, Rosario, Tanza, Naic, Maragondon, and Ternate. The richness of Cavite's coastal resources is a major producer of oysters and mussels. The fishing industry also produces shrimp and bangus (milkfish). The western coastline are lined with pale gray sand beaches popular with tourists. Thus, fishery and tourism contribute to the economic activity of the province.

==== Major rivers ====
These rivers are known to have various tributaries passing through the municipalities of the province (not including unnamed rivers):

- Alasas River
- Alemang River
- Aliang River
- Aloague River
- Anino River
- Balsahan River
- Bacoor River
- Borahan River
- Cabuco River
- Calibuyo River
- Caloocan River
- Cañas River
- Capipisa River
- Catmon River
- Dasmariñas River
- Don Celia River
- Habulin River
- Imus River
- Julian River
- Kay Albaran River
- Kaytitinga River
- Labac River
- Langke River
- Las Piñas River
- Maagay River
- Maalimango River
- Matangilan River
- Maragondon River
- Molino River
- Narvaes River
- Obispo River
- Palicpican River
- Panamitan River
- Panasayan River
- Pasong Camachile River
- Pulunan River
- Quiling River
- San Juan River or Rio Grande (Grande River)
- Silang - Santa Rosa River
- Sinaliw River
- Sinilang River
- Soro-Soro River
- Tabe River
- Timalan River
- Tres Cruses River
- Tunasan River
- Ylang-Ylang River
- Zambal River
- Zapote River

==== Springs ====
- Balite Spring (Amadeo)
- Saluysoy Spring (Alfonso)
- Matang Tubig Spring (Silang, Cavite)
- Malakas Spring (General Aguinaldo)
- Ulo Spring (Mendez)
- Bucal ni Tata Enteng Spring (Indang)

==== Waterfalls ====
- Palsajingin Falls (Indang)
- Balite Falls (Amadeo)
- Malibiclibic Falls (Gen. Aguinaldo)
- Talon-Butas Falls (Gen. Aguinaldo)
- Saluysoy Falls (Alfonso)
- Tala River (Gen. Aguinaldo)
- Utod Falls (Magallanes)
- Mayang Falls (Trece Martires City)
- Pantihan Falls (Maragondon)

=== Soil properties ===
Cavite is composed of several soil types according to soil surveys conducted by the Bureau of Soils and Water Management (BSWM). Classification of soil types in a specific area is a very important consideration in identifying its most fitted land-use. This way, utmost productivity can be achieved.

The lowland area of Cavite is generally composed of Guadalupe clay and clay loam. It is characterized as coarse and granular when dry but sticky and plastic when wet. Its substratum is solid volcanic tuff. These types of soils are suited to lowland rice and corn while those in the upland are suited for orchard and pasture. Guadalupe clay adobes are abundant in the southern part of Bacoor and Imus bordering Dasmariñas. The soil is hard and compact and difficult to cultivate that makes it generally unsuitable for diverse cropping. It is very sticky when wet and granular when dry. Forage grass is advised for this type of soil. Hydrosol and Obando sand are found along Bacoor Bay. The shoreline of Rosario, Tanza, Naic and Ternate are lined with Guadalupe sand.

The central area principally consists of Magallanes loam with streaks of Magallanes clay loam of sandy texture. This is recommended for diversified farming such as the cultivation of upland rice, corn, sugarcane, vegetables, coconut, coffee, mangoes and other fruit trees. The steep phase should be forested or planted to root crops. The eastern side of Cavite consists of Carmona clay loam with streaks of Carmona clay loam steep phase and Carmona sandy clay loam. This type of soil is granular with tuffaceous material and concretions. It is hard and compact when dry, sticky and plastic when wet. This type of soil is planted to rice with irrigation or sugarcane without irrigation. Fruit trees such as mango, avocado and citrus are also grown in this type of soil. Guingua fine sandy loam is found along the lower part of Malabon and Alang-ilang River at Noveleta.

The type of soils that dominate the upland areas are Tagaytay loam and Tagaytay sandy loam with mountain soil undifferentiated found on the south-eastern side bordering Laguna province. Also on the southern tip are Magallanes clay and Mountain soil undifferentiated with interlacing of Magallanes clay loam steep phase. The Tagaytay loam contains fine sandy materials, moderately friable, and easy to work on when moist. In an undisturbed condition, it bakes and becomes hard when dry. About one-half of this soil type is devoted to upland rice and upland crops. On the other hand, Tagaytay sandy loam is friable and granular with considerable amount of volcanic sand and underlain by adobe clay. Mountain soil undifferentiated is forested with bamboos found in the sea coast. Cavite also has the Patungan sand characterized by pale gray to almost white sand with substratum of marine conglomerates which are found at Santa Mercedes in Maragondon and in some coastlines of Ternate.

=== Mineral resources and reserves ===
The greater parts of Cavite are composed of volcanic materials, tuff, cinders, basalt, breccias, agglomerate and interbeddings of shales, and sandstones. The dormant and active volcanoes (Taal) are within these volcanic areas and have been the sources of volcanic materials which form the Tagaytay Cuesta. The drainage systems are deeply entrenched in the tuffs, eroding thin interbedded sandstones and conglomerate rocks which are the sources of little reserves of sand and gravel in the larger stream. Adobe stone quarries also flourish in the tuff areas.

Cavite coastal areas have marl and conglomerate sedimentary rocks and some igneous rocks which are prominent in the high, mountainous regions of western part of the province. Black sands are found in Kawit while Noveleta has its own salt products. Magallanes has gravel deposits while reserves of sand and gravel materials are found in Alfonso, Carmona, Gen. Emilio Aguinaldo, Naic, Ternate, Maragondon and Silang.

=== Administrative divisions ===
Cavite comprises 15 municipalities and 8 cities:

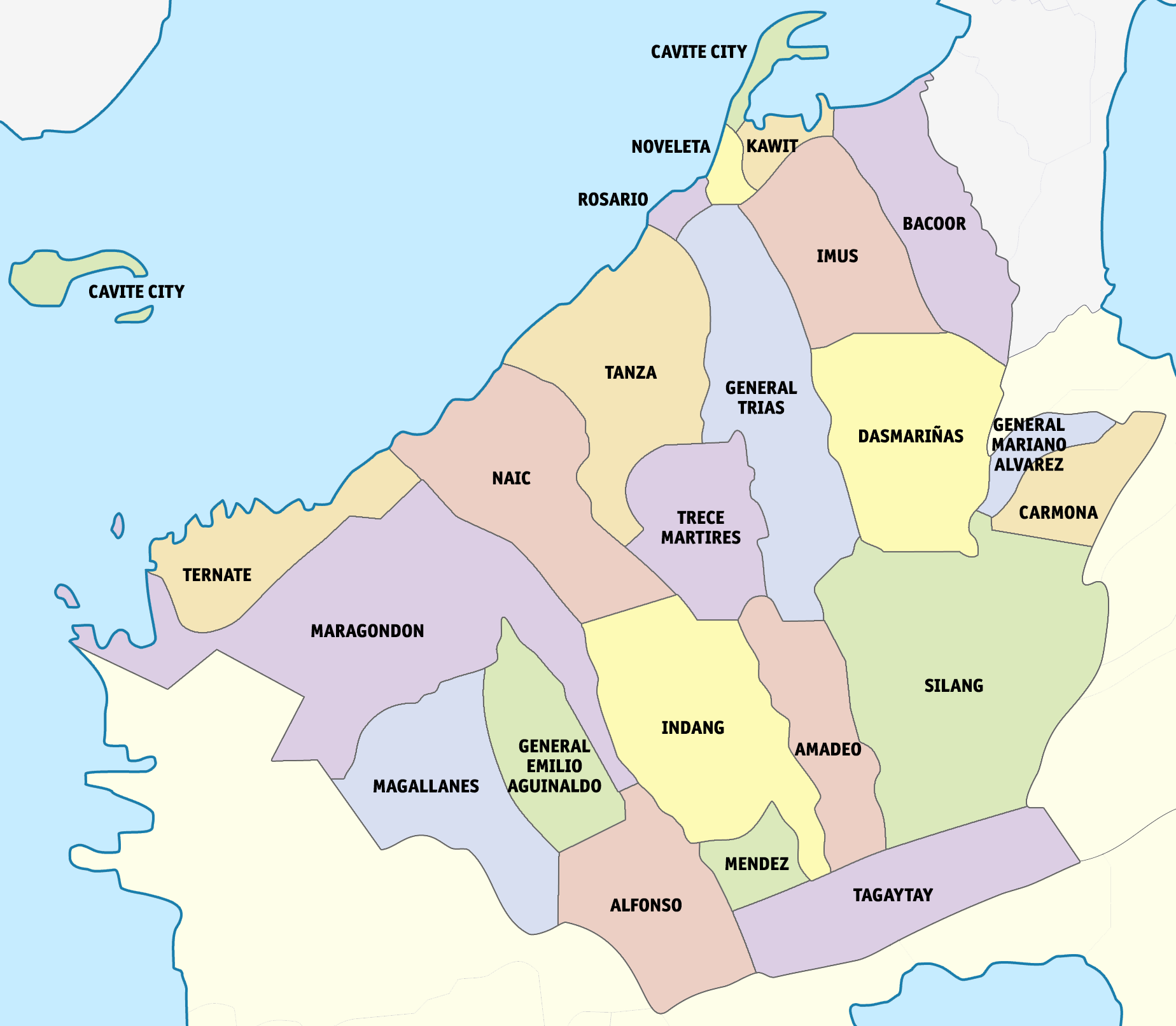
Political divisions of Cavite

- † De jure provincial capital and component city
- †∗ De facto provincial capital and component city
- ∗ Component city
- Municipality
- ∞ Largest settlement

City or municipality		District	Population			±% p.a.	Area		Density		Barangay	Coordinates (Note: Coordinates mark the city/town center, and are sortable by latitude.)
			(2024)		(2020)		km^{2}	sq mi	/km^{2}	/sq mi		
Alfonso		8th	1.3%	60,583	59,306	0.53%	66.58	25.71	891	2,307	32	14°08′18″N 120°51′22″E
Amadeo		7th	1.0%	44,190	41,901	1.34%	36.92	14.25	1,135	2,939	26	14°10′10″N 120°55′19″E
Bacoor	∗	2nd	14.5%	661,381	664,625	−0.12%	46.17	17.83	14,395	37,283	47	14°27′34″N 120°56′24″E
Carmona	∗	5th	2.5%	112,140	106,256	1.36%	29.68	11.46	3,580	9,272	14	14°18′57″N 121°03′22″E
Cavite City	∗	1st	2.2%	98,673	100,674	−0.50%	10.89	4.20	9,245	23,943	84	14°28′55″N 120°54′32″E
Dasmariñas	∗∞	4th	16.3%	744,511	703,141	1.44%	90.13	34.80	7,801	20,206	75	14°19′37″N 120°56′13″E
General Emilio Aguinaldo		8th	0.5%	24,264	23,973	0.30%	42.13	16.27	569	1,474	14	14°11′04″N 120°47′49″E
General Mariano Alvarez		5th	3.9%	176,927	172,433	0.65%	9.40	3.63	18,344	47,511	27	14°17′54″N 121°00′25″E
General Trias	∗	6th	10.5%	482,453	450,583	1.72%	90.01	34.75	5,006	12,965	33	14°23′10″N 120°52′50″E
Imus	†	3rd	10.5%	481,949	496,794	−0.76%	53.15	20.52	9,347	24,209	97	14°25′08″N 120°55′52″E
Indang		7th	1.5%	70,092	68,699	0.50%	74.90	28.92	917	2,376	36	14°11′43″N 120°52′38″E
Kawit		1st	2.7%	123,631	107,535	3.55%	25.15	9.71	4,276	11,074	23	14°26′39″N 120°54′13″E
Magallanes		8th	0.6%	25,826	23,851	2.01%	73.07	28.21	326	845	16	14°11′15″N 120°45′25″E
Maragondon		8th	0.9%	41,977	40,687	0.78%	164.61	63.56	247	640	27	14°16′25″N 120°44′10″E
Mendez		8th	0.8%	36,518	34,879	1.15%	43.27	16.71	806	2,088	24	14°07′48″N 120°54′18″E
Naic		8th	5.2%	236,978	160,987	10.15%	75.81	29.27	2,124	5,500	30	14°19′17″N 120°46′18″E
Noveleta		1st	1.0%	46,172	49,452	−1.70%	16.43	6.34	3,010	7,796	16	14.4333°N 120.8833°E
Rosario		1st	2.5%	112,572	110,807	0.40%	7.61	2.94	14,561	37,712	20	14°24′54″N 120°51′12″E
Silang		5th	6.8%	313,145	295,644	1.45%	209.43	80.86	1,412	3,656	64	14°13′25″N 120°58′27″E
Tagaytay	∗	8th	1.9%	87,811	85,330	0.72%	65.00	25.10	1,313	3,400	34	14°06′54″N 120°57′49″E
Tanza		7th	7.4%	339,308	312,116	2.11%	78.33	30.24	3,985	10,320	41	14°23′33″N 120°51′13″E
Ternate		8th	0.5%	24,891	24,653	0.24%	59.93	23.14	411	1,065	10	14°17′09″N 120°42′59″E
Trece Martires	†∗	7th	5.0%	227,892	210,503	2.00%	39.10	15.10	5,384	13,944	13	14°16′46″N 120°52′02″E
Total				4,573,884	4,344,829	1.29%	1,574.17	607.79	2,760	7,149	829	(see GeoGroup box)

=== Climate ===
Cavite belongs to Type 1 climate based on the Climate Map of the Philippines by the Philippine Atmospheric, Geophysical and Astronomical Services Administration (PAGASA). Being a Type 1, Cavite has two pronounced seasons – the dry season, which usually begins in November and ends in April, and the rainy season, which starts in May and ends in October. The Köppen Climate Classification sub-type for this climate is "Am" (Tropical Monsoon Climate).

Climate data for Cavite
Month	Jan	Feb	Mar	Apr	May	Jun	Jul	Aug	Sep	Oct	Nov	Dec	Year
Mean daily maximum °C (°F)	29 (84)	29 (84)	31 (87)	32 (89)	33 (91)	31 (87)	30 (86)	30 (86)	30 (86)	30 (86)	30 (86)	29 (84)	30 (86)
Mean daily minimum °C (°F)	23 (73)	23 (73)	24 (75)	25 (77)	26 (78)	25 (77)	25 (77)	25 (77)	25 (77)	25 (77)	24 (75)	24 (75)	24 (75)
Average precipitation mm (inches)	13 (0.5)	5.1 (0.2)	10 (0.4)	18 (0.7)	120 (4.8)	250 (9.9)	290 (11.6)	420 (16.4)	340 (13.3)	150 (6.1)	110 (4.4)	53 (2.1)	1,780 (70.1)
Source: Weatherbase

== Demographics ==
Cavite had a total population of 4,573,884 people in the 2024 census, making it the most populous (if independent cities are excluded from Cebu), and the second most densely populated province in the country. The tremendous increase can be observed in the year 1990 when industrialization was introduced in the province. Investors established their businesses in different industrial estates that magnetized people to migrate to Cavite due to job opportunities the province offers. Another factor attributed to the increase of population is the mushrooming of housing subdivisions. Since Cavite is proximate to Metro Manila, people working in the metropolitan area choose to live in the province together with their families. Natural increase also contributes to the increase in population. The population density of the province based on the 2020 census was 2,800 inhabitants per square kilometre or 7,300 inhabitants per square mile.

Among the cities and municipalities in Cavite, the city of Dasmariñas has the biggest population with 703,141 people while the municipality of Magallanes has registered the smallest population with 23,851 people.

Cavite is classified as predominantly urban having 90.69 percent of the population concentrated in the urban areas, while 9.21 percent of the population reside in the rural areas.

Population census of Cavite

Year	Pop.	±% p.a.
1903	134,779	—
1918	157,355	+1.04%
1939	238,581	+2.00%
1948	262,550	+1.07%
1960	378,138	+3.09%
1970	520,180	+3.24%

Year	Pop.	±% p.a.
1975	628,321	+3.86%
1980	771,320	+4.18%
1990	1,152,534	+4.10%
1995	1,610,324	+6.47%
2000	2,063,161	+5.46%
2007	2,856,765	+4.59%

Year	Pop.	±% p.a.
2010	3,090,691	+2.91%
2015	3,678,301	+3.37%
2020	4,344,829	+3.57%
2024	4,573,884	+1.24%

Source: Philippine Statistics Authority

=== Religion ===
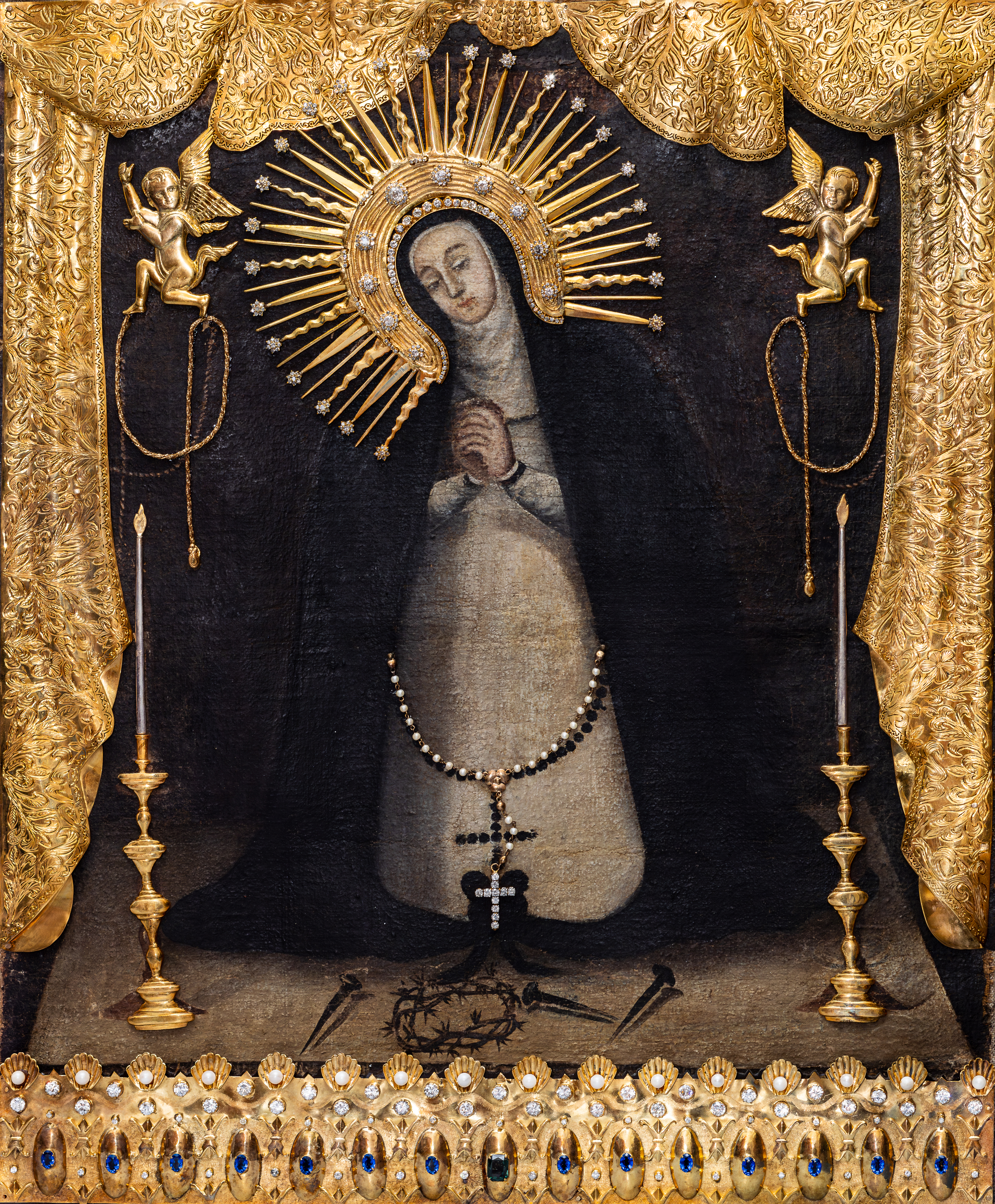
Our Lady of Solitude of Porta Vaga, Patroness of the Province of Cavite

==== Christianity ====
In line with national statistics, Christianity is the predominant faith in the province, composed of Catholics, Protestants, and other Independent Christian groups. The majority (70%) of the population are Roman Catholic under the jurisdiction of the Diocese of Imus. Our Lady of Solitude of Porta Vaga is the titular patroness of the province.

Adherents of the Philippine Independent Church, also known as the Aglipayan Church, under the jurisdiction of the Diocese of Cavite are particularly found in the towns where historically the Philippine Revolution and anti-clericalist sentiments are strong.

The Eastern Orthodox Church presence in Cavite province was a part of the Philippine Orthodox Church here in the Philippines under the jurisdiction of the Patriarchate of Moscow and its own Orthodox Diocese province in Southeast Asia the Diocese of the Philippines and Vietnam. Many Orthodox community lives throughout the province especially in the city of Tagaytay.

The Episcopal Church presence in Cavite province was a part of the Episcopal Church in the Philippines under the jurisdiction of the Diocese of Central Philippines. Many Episcopalian community lives throughout the province especially as part of its mission territory.

==== Protestantism ====
Iglesia ni Cristo, the largest minority in the province, subdivided in 2 ecclesiastical district (Cavite and Cavite South). Has numerous chapels the exact significance presence forming 4% followers.

The strong presence of other Christian denominations and sects such as the mainline Protestant Evangelical Churches, Christian Fellowships, Confessional churches and other Christian sects are also evident throughout the province. The Church of Jesus Christ of Latter-day Saints are in Cavite. Remarkably, the Seventh-day Adventist Church has established its key institutions in the province such as the Adventist University of the Philippines, Adventist International Institute of Advanced Studies, Southern Asia-Pacific Division, and Cavite Mission. Meanwhile, the Members Church of God International (MCGI) has established coordinating centers throughout the province and a local convention center situated in Barangay Biga, Silang, Cavite.

==== Islam ====
With the influx of Filipino Muslim migrants from the Mindanao, local Caviteño Balik Islam or reverts, and some non-Filipino expats, their OFW spouses and children returning from Muslim countries, Sunni Islam of either the Shafii or Hanbali schools-of-thought has become evident in various areas of the province, and accounts for the majority of the non-Christian population.

Mosques, prayer halls, and prayer rooms catering to the community exist in places where local Muslim Caviteños live and work; especially in the cities of Bacoor, Imus, and Dasmariñas, as well as the municipality of Rosario.

Interreligious dialogue and communal relations between the majority Christians and minority Muslims are peaceful and amicable, with some families consisting of both Christian and Muslim members.

==== Other faiths ====
Non-Abrahamic faiths include native Tagalog anitism, animism, rizalista, Sikhism, and Hinduism. Among the local Chinese and Chinese-Filipino communities, Taoism, Buddhism, and Confucianism are followed.

=== Languages ===
Population by ethnicity (2020)
Ethnicity	Population
Tagalog	2,354,823 (54.53%)
Bisaya	496,721 (11.5%)
Caviteño	464,298 (10.75%)
Bicolano	294,481 (6.82%)
Waray	169,841 (3.93%)
Hiligaynon	154,887 (3.59%)
Ilocano	126,349 (2.93%)
Cebuano	51,169 (1.18%)
Others	205,434 (4.76%)
Not Reported	660 (0.02%)

The main languages spoken are Tagalog and English, with the former also used alongside a native Cavite dialect that has variants in each municipality of the province. Due to the proximity of Metro Manila cities bordering Cavite to the north, a significant number of people from farther provinces have migrated to Cavite, resulting in minor yet notable use of Bicolano, Cebuano, Ilocano, Hiligaynon, Kapampangan, Waray, Maranao, Maguindanaon, and Tausug languages.

==== Chavacano in Cavite ====
Chavacano, or Chabacano, is a Spanish-based creole language known in linguistics as Philippine Creole Spanish. Chabacano was originally spoken by the majority of Caviteños living in Cavite City and Ternate after the arrival of the Spaniards three centuries ago. Various groups in the area, with different linguistic backgrounds, adopted a pidgin language—mainly with Spanish vocabulary—to communicate with one another. As children in Cavite grew up with this pidgin as their native language, it evolved into a creole language.

Now used almost exclusively in Cavite City and coastal Ternate, Chabacano reached its widest diffusion and greatest splendor during the Spanish and American periods of Filipino history, when newspapers and literary works flourished. Cavite Chabacano was relatively easy to speak, as it was essentially a simplified version of Castilian morphology patterned after Tagalog syntax. Gradually and naturally, it acquired sounds present in the Spanish phonological system. After World War II, creole Spanish speakers in the capital of the archipelago disappeared. Today, around 30,000 Caviteños, mostly elderly, still speak Chabacano. The language is now taught in elementary schools in both Cavite City and Ternate as part of the K-12 national curriculum from first to third grade, fostering a new generation of speakers and writers in the province.

== Culture ==
Aside from the celebrations of town fiestas, the province of Cavite celebrates festivals as forms of thanksgiving for a bountiful harvest. Some of these festivals are also observed in honor of the historical legacies, passed from one generation to another. In fact, the province fetes the Kalayaan Festival, which is addressed to commemorate the heroism of its people. The annual Fiesta de la Reina del Provincia de Cavite is a grandiose fiesta celebration in honor of the patroness of the province during the Spanish period and before the Diocese of Imus was created, the Nuestra Señora de la Soledad de Porta Vaga. The image is enshrined at San Roque Church in Cavite City. Her feastday is celebrated every 2nd and 3rd Sunday of November.

Traditions and fiesta celebrations include Mardicas, a war dance held in Ternate town. Karakol street dancing with a fluvial procession is usually held in coastal towns. There is also a pre-colonial ritual called the Sanghiyang as a form of thanksgiving and to heal the sick. Another cultural tradition is the Live via Crucis or Kalbaryo ni Hesus held during Holy Week. The Maytinis or word prayer that is annually held in Kawit every December 24 before the beginning of the midnight Mass.

=== Festivals ===
Event	Location	Description
Fiesta de la Reina de Caracol	Rosario	Held every 3rd weekend of May and 1st weekend of October. It celebrates the feast of the town patroness Nuestra Señora Virgen del Santissimo Rosario, Reina de Caracol starting with the traditional Caracol or "Karakol", which traditionally has two parts, the "Caracol del Mar" or fluvial procession and the "Caracol dela Tierra" or "karakol sa lupa". Caracol started in the town of Rosario and after how many years it spread to the whole province.
Fiesta de la Reina de Cavite	Cavite City	Celebrated every 2nd and 3rd Sunday of November in honor of Cavite city's patroness, Nuestra Señora de la Soledad de Porta Vaga. It is also known as Cavite City fiesta.
Valenciana Festival	General Trias	A month-long celebration held in honor of the Blessed Virgin Mary. Church is decorated with flowers. Every month of May. This festival also showcases the Filipino paella-like dish called Valenciana which is a local delicacy in General Trias.
Irok Festival	Indang	Done during the celebration of Indang Day. Float parade, street dancing, sports activities, lantern contest made out of irok leaves and a grand parade are held in the town plaza. Celebrated every November 30 to December 2.
Kabutenyo Festival	General Mariano Alvarez	Celebration and thanksgiving for bountiful mushrooms. Activities includes street dancing, trade fair and culinary contest with mushroom as main ingredients. Every March 13.
Kakanindayog Festival	Imus	The festival is celebrated to promote the native kakanin & other delicacies which the city is well known for such as Puto Lansong. Celebrates every month of October in honor of the city's patroness Nuestra Señora del Pilar and the founding anniversary of the city through street dancing and the traditional "Karakol" procession.
Kalayaan Festival	Provincewide	It is a 2-week-long province wide event held annually from May 28 to June 12. As its name suggests, the series of events for the festival are held to celebrate the independence day season.
Kawayan Festival	Maragondon	Held every 7th day of September wherein a group of street dancers parade in indigenous materials. An exhibit of bamboo products likewise done in the town plaza.
Marching Band Festival	Bacoor	To promote the musical heritage of the city & boost tourism through its number of marching bands around the country. Celebrated every 2nd weekend of May in honor of St. Michael the Archangel & Our Lady of the Most Holy Rosary.
Mardicas	Ternate	Fluvial parades carrying the image of Santo Niño are held and continue in the streets of the municipality and ends in the churchyard. Karakol and street dancing in colorful costumes with brass band music. Every 3rd weekend of January.
Maytinis	Kawit	Re-enactment of Christ's birth on midnight of December 24 through a procession of colorful floats & costumes.
Pahimis Festival	Amadeo	Also Called the "Coffee Festival" as way of thanksgiving for abundant harvest of coffee in the municipality. Trade fair, street dancing, beauty pageant, coffee convention are the usual activities done during the occasion. Free flowing drinking of coffee is offered to everybody. Celebrates every 2nd week of February
Paskuhan sa Imus	Imus	A month-long festival of Christmas holiday. The city is decorated with thousands of lights, a dazzling array of lanterns of all shapes and a food fair featuring the best of Cavite products.
Pista ng mga Puso	Tagaytay	Festival held annually on Valentine's Day in honor of the city's patroness Our Lady of Lourdes. There are Karakol dancers parading and marching all over the city.
Regada Festival	Cavite City	Also called the "Water Festival", the festival consists of games, street dancing, photo exhibit, trade fair, concert and water splashing. The festival is done three days from June 22–24 done in celebration of St. John the Baptist.
Sapyaw Festival	Tanza	Street dancing are done all over the streets of the municipality with their attractive and very colorful costumes. Various barangays join the dancing in honor of St. Augustine. Every 20th day of August.
Silang Prutas Festival	Silang	Celebration and thanksgiving for bountiful fruits harvested in the said municipality. Activities includes street dancing, trade fair and culinary contest with fruits as the main source of income. Celebrates every February 2 in honor of the town's patroness Our Lady of Candelaria.
Sorteo ng Bukid	Carmona	Local festival held every three years of February to relive the old practice of distributing agricultural lots to deserving farmers through raffle draws.
Sumilang Festival	Silang	Recognized as an agriculture event. The occasion is participated in by dancers who come from the agricultural sector. Every February 1 to 3 in celebration of the feast of Our Lady of Candelaria.
Tahong Festival	Bacoor	Different cuisines with tahong as main ingredient are on exhibit at the town plaza. Culinary contest are held annually. Various activities are done such as beauty contest. Tahong symposium and seminars are held for culture of Tahong. Every September 29.
Tinapa Festival	Rosario	The festival is celebrated to promote and perpetuate the image of Rosario as the place where smoked fish called "Tinapang Salinas" originates. Celebrates every month of October in honor of the town's patroness Nuestra Señora del Santissimo Rosario Reina de Caracol.
Wagayway Festival	Imus	Every 28th day of May, household display of Philippine flag is encouraged during the festival, and simultaneous waving of flags in the streets of Cavite. Different activities such as exhibits, trade fair, product displays are held. It also commemorates the Battle of Alapan and as a kick-off celebration of the provincewide Kalayaan Festival.
Paru-paro Festival	Dasmariñas	Every 26th day of November, it commemorates the city of Dasmariñas.

=== Special events ===
Foundation Day

Cavite Province celebrates its foundation every March 10.

Birthday of Gen. Emilio Aguinaldo

This is celebrated every March 22 in commemoration of the birth of the First President of the Republic.

Independence Day

This is celebrated every June 12 in Kawit as a re-enactment of the historic proclamation of Philippine independence at the mansion of Gen. Emilio Aguinaldo.

=== Sports ===
Cavite is currently home to the Imus Agimat, one of the ten charter teams of the Maharlika Pilipinas Basketball League (MPBL), and the Bacoor City Strikers, one of the eight charter teams of the Maharlika Pilipinas Volleyball Association (MPVA). Previously, it was also home to the Bacoor City Strikers basketball team of the MPBL.

AsiaBasket held a tournament in Dasmariñas in November 2023 at the Dasmariñas Arena, which also hosted a selection of Philippine Basketball Association games.

== Economy ==
Poverty incidence of Cavite (%)

Source: Philippine Statistics Authority

=== Agriculture ===
The province is predominantly an agriculture province. The province's economy is largely dependent on agriculture. Despite urbanization and industrialization, still, a significant number of inhabitants are engaged into agribusinesses. The data gathered from Office of the Provincial Agriculturist shows that though the province lies in the industrial belt, the agricultural land is about 49.38% or 70,466.53 hectares (174,126.6 acres) of the total land area of the Province. This is 1,176.5 hectares (2,907 acres) bigger than that of the declared agricultural lands in 2008 (69,290.03 hectares or 171,219.4 acres).

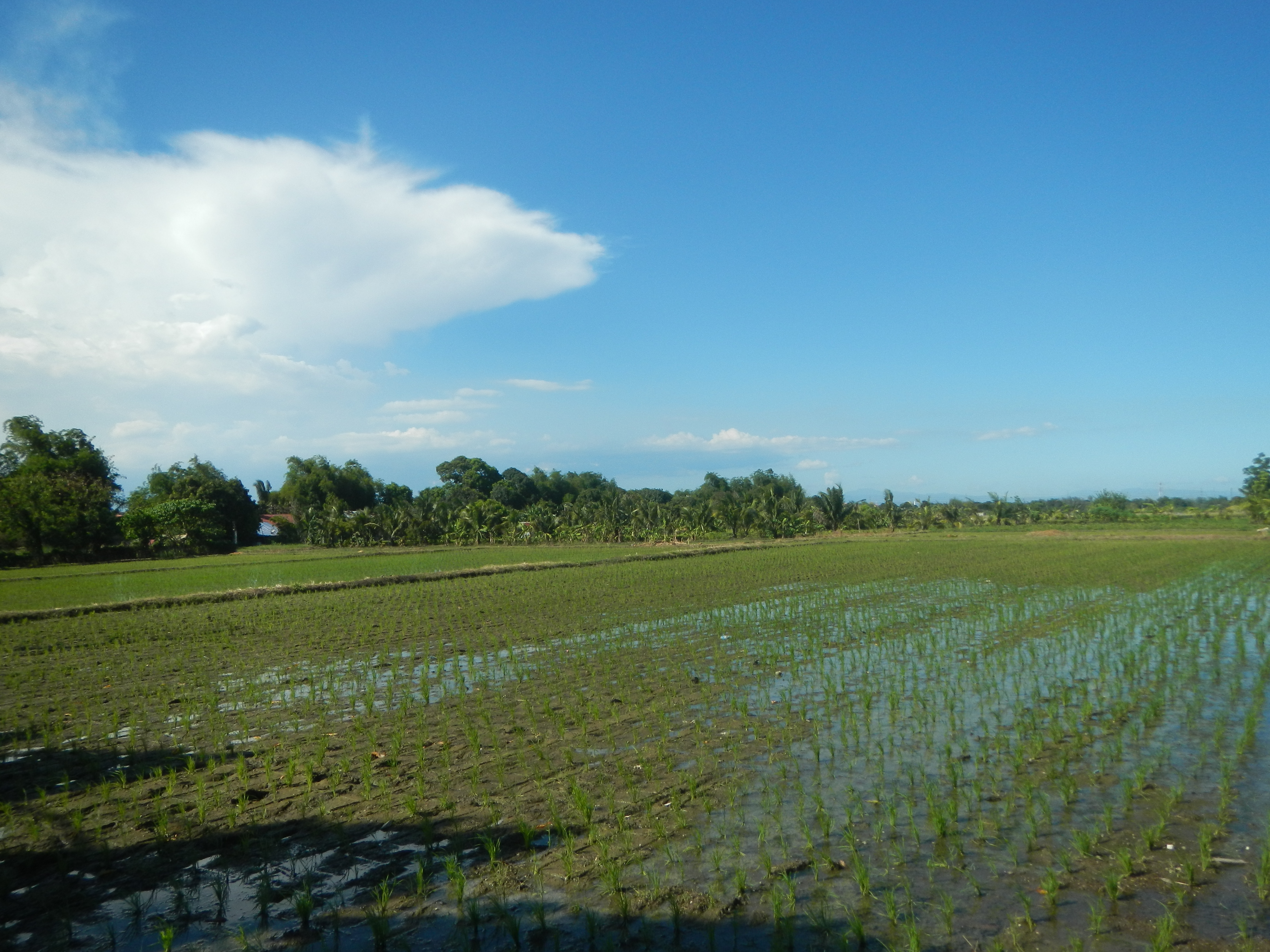
Rice plantation in Carmona

The municipality of Maragondon has the biggest area intended for agriculture, accounts for 14.57% of the total provincial agricultural lands while Cavite City has no longer available land for agriculture related activities and industries. If based on total agricultural lands, we may say that the major players in agriculture in the province are Maragondon, Silang, Indang, Naic and Alfonso. Of the eight districts in the province, the top three with the widest agricultural area are 7th District comprising 43,587.01 hectares (107,705.8 acres) or 61.85% of the total agricultural areas with 27,115 farmers followed by 6th District with 17.40% or 12,257.71 hectares (30,289.5 acres) having 8,701 farmers and 5th District comprising 10,248.55 hectares (25,324.7 acres) with 10,295 farmers. The municipality of Silang has the most farmers. The municipality of Maragondon only ranks 3rd in terms of number of farmers. This can be attributed to highly mechanized operations and vast plantations of rice. The same is true with General Trias and Naic, known as the rice producing municipalities in Cavite. The number of farmers increased by 6.5% that corresponds to around 3,097 farmers. The increase in the number of farmers was due to worldwide recession which led to work displacement of some inhabitants. Silang is dominated by pineapple and coffee plantations as well as with cut flower production.

=== Industry and commerce ===
Cavite has twelve economic zones. The largest economic zone under development is located in General Trias, the PEC Industrial Park with 177 hectares (440 acres) intended for garments, textiles, semiconductors, food processing and pharmaceuticals.

==== Township Developments (Completed and Ongoing Projects) ====
- Vista City / Villar Land (Vista Land) 2,500 ha (6,200 acres) — Bacoor and Dasmariñas (shared with Las Piñas and Muntinlupa)
- Lancaster New City (PRO-Friends Inc.) 3,400 ha (8,400 acres) — Imus, Kawit and General Trias
- Aera (Ayala Land) 900 ha (2,200 acres) — Carmona and Silang
- Vermosa (Ayala Land) 770 ha (1,900 acres) — Imus and Dasmariñas
- Eagle Ridge Golf & Residential Estates (Sta. Lucia) 700 ha (1,700 acres) — General Trias
- Riverpark (Federal Land and SM Development Corp.) 700 ha (1,700 acres) — General Trias
- Southwoods City (Megaworld) 561 ha (1,390 acres) — Carmona (shared with Biñan, Laguna)
- Suntrust Ecotown (Megaworld) 350 ha (860 acres) — Tanza
- Arden Botanical Estate (Megaworld) 251 ha (620 acres) — Trece Martires and Tanza
- Evo City (Ayala Land) 250 ha (620 acres) — Kawit
- South Forbes City (Cathay Land) 250 ha (620 acres) — Silang
- Golden Horizon (HG-III Construction and Development Corp.) 250 ha (620 acres) — Trece Martires
- SM Smart City (SM Development Corp.) 200 ha (490 acres) — Carmona
- NOMO Garden City (Vista Land) 180 ha (440 acres) — Bacoor
- Antel Grand (Antel Holdings) 170 ha (420 acres) — General Trias
- Maple Grove (Megaworld) 140 ha (350 acres) — General Trias
- Stanza (Vista Land) 110 ha (270 acres) — Tanza
- Crosswinds (Vista Land) 100 ha (250 acres) — Tagaytay
- Mallorca City (Cathay Land) 100 ha (250 acres) — Silang and Carmona
- POGO City (PAGCOR) 70 ha (170 acres) — Kawit
- Idesia City (Hankyu Hanshin Holdings Inc. and P.A. Properties) 37 ha (91 acres) — Dasmariñas
- Crest Key Estates (Cathay Land) 19 ha (47 acres) — Silang
- Praverde Dasmariñas (Vista Land) 12 ha (30 acres) — Dasmariñas
- Zentria Silang (Vista Land) 37 ha (91 acres) — Silang

=== Mining ===
The mining industry in Cavite is small, but it does generate some revenue for the province. In 2022, there were three producing aggregates quarries in Cavite that employed 279 people. The total value of mineral production in Cavite in 2015 was ₱3.22 billion.

The provincial government of Cavite is committed to promoting sustainable development. The province has a number of social development programs in place, such as a livelihood program, an educational assistance program, and a health, nutrition, and sanitation program. The province also has a number of environmental protection programs in place, such as a program to plant trees in mined-out areas.

== Tourism ==
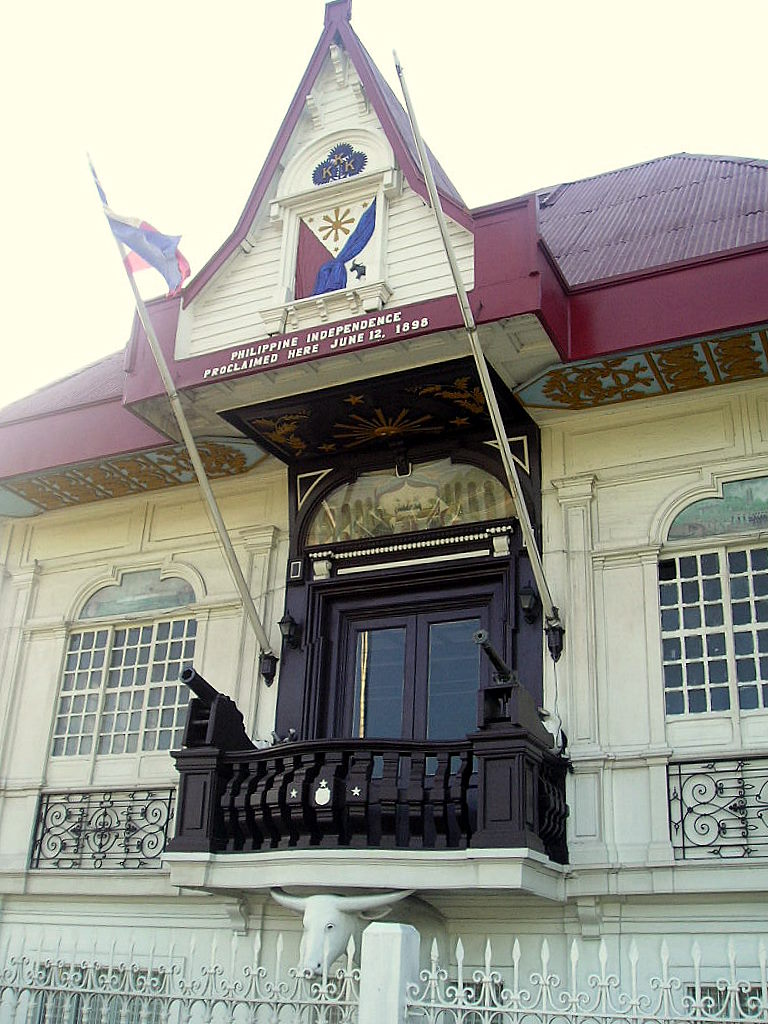
Aguinaldo Shrine, the birthplace of Philippine Independence

Tagaytay serves as the main tourist center in the province. Historical attraction and sites are Fort San Felipe and Sangley Point, both in Cavite City; Corregidor Island; General Trias; Calero Bridge, Noveleta; Battle of Alapan Marker and Flag in Imus; Zapote Bridge in Bacoor; Battle of Binakayan Monument in Kawit; Tejeros Convention Site in Rosario; and Aguinaldo Shrine, the site of the declaration of Philippine Independence in Kawit. Several old churches stand as glorious reminders of how the Catholic faith has blossomed in the Province of Cavite. Existing museums include Geronimo de los Reyes Museum, General Trias; Museo De La Salle, Dasmariñas; Philippine Navy Museum, Cavite City; Baldomero Aguinaldo Museum, Kawit; and Cavite City Library Museum, Cavite City. There are eight world-class golf courses in the province. Natural wonders are mostly found in the upland areas such as Tagaytay Ridge, Macabag Cave in Maragondon, Balite Falls in Amadeo, Malibiclibic Falls in General Aguinaldo-Magallanes border, Mts. Palay-Palay and Mataas na Gulod National Park in Ternate and Maragondon, Sitio Buhay Unclassified Forest in Magallanes and flowers, vegetables and coffee farms.

The Aguinaldo Shrine and Museum in Kawit is where the independence of the Philippines was proclaimed on June 12, 1898, by General Aguinaldo, the Philippines' first president. The multi-level structure includes a mezzanine and tower, and spans 14,000 square feet (1,300 m^{2}). Today, the ground floor serves as a museum, which houses historical artifacts. The tomb of Aguinaldo lies in a garden behind the house.

The Andrés Bonifacio House in General Trias is the former home of the country's revolutionary leader. The site of his court martial in Maragondon is also preserved.

Other historical sites include the Battle of Alapan and Battle of Julian Bridge Markers, the House of Tirona, and Fort San Felipe.

The main churches of the province are the Imus Cathedral, San Roque Parish in Cavite City where the miraculous image of Nuestra Señora de la Soledad de Porta Vaga enshrined., Bacoor, Silang, Naic, Dasmariñas, Tanza, Ternate, Indang, General Trias, Kawit and Maragondon Catholic Churches. The Shrines of Our Lady of La Salette in Silang, and St. Anne, Tagaytay, also attract pilgrims.

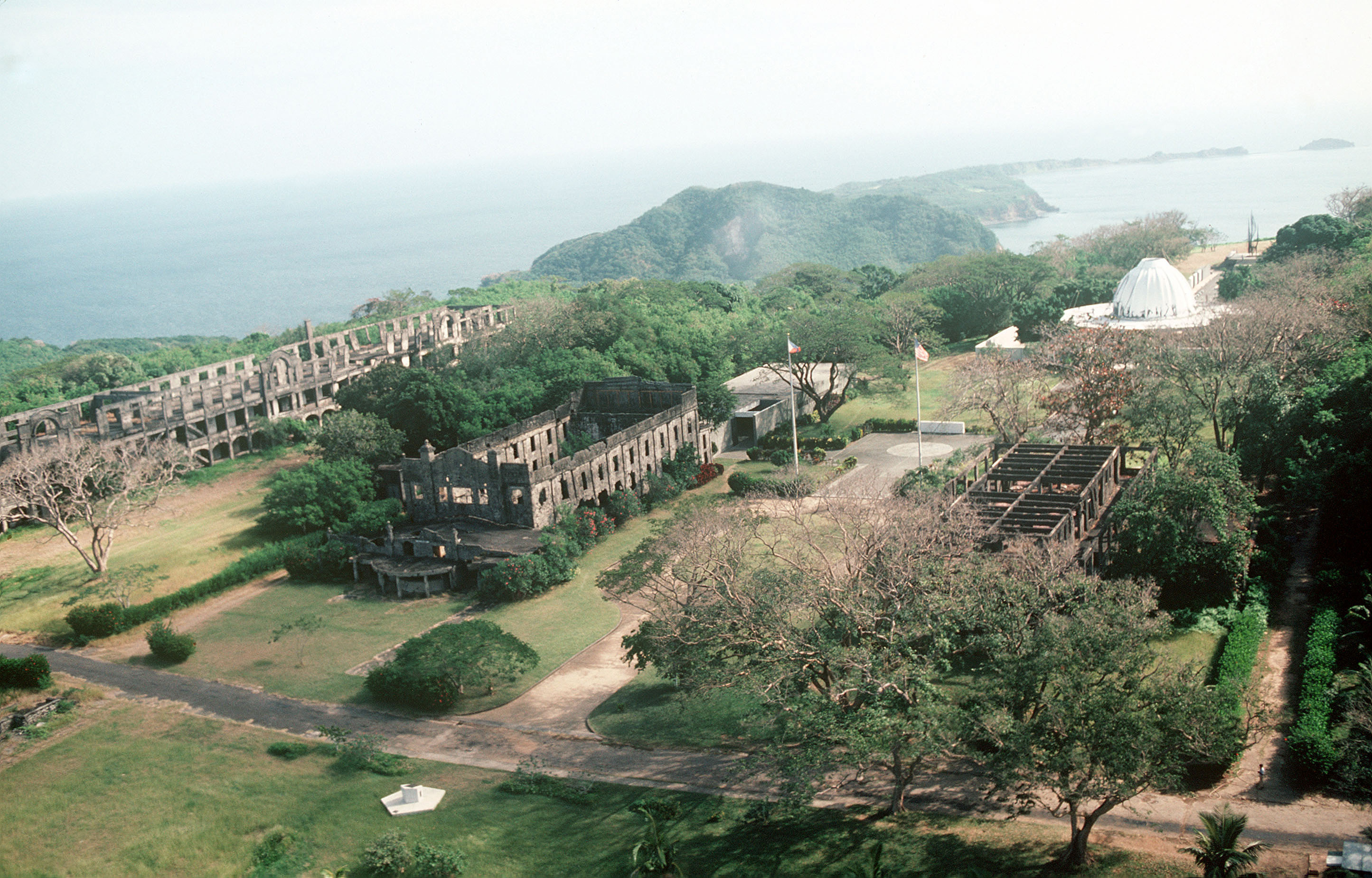
Corregidor, the last bastion of Philippine-American defense forces

Corregidor is an island fortress where Filipino and American forces fought against the Japanese invaders in 1942. It has become a tourist attraction with tunnels, cannons and other war structures still well-preserved. The famous line of General Douglas MacArthur said is associated with Corregidor: "I shall return!"

There are first class hotels, inns and lodging houses to accommodate both foreign and local tourists. Conference facilities can be found in several convention centers, hotels and resorts in the province. Restaurants and specialty dining places offer mushroom dishes, native delicacies and exotic cuisines. Seafoods, fruits, coffee, organic vegetables, tinapa, handicrafts, ornamental plants also abound in the province.

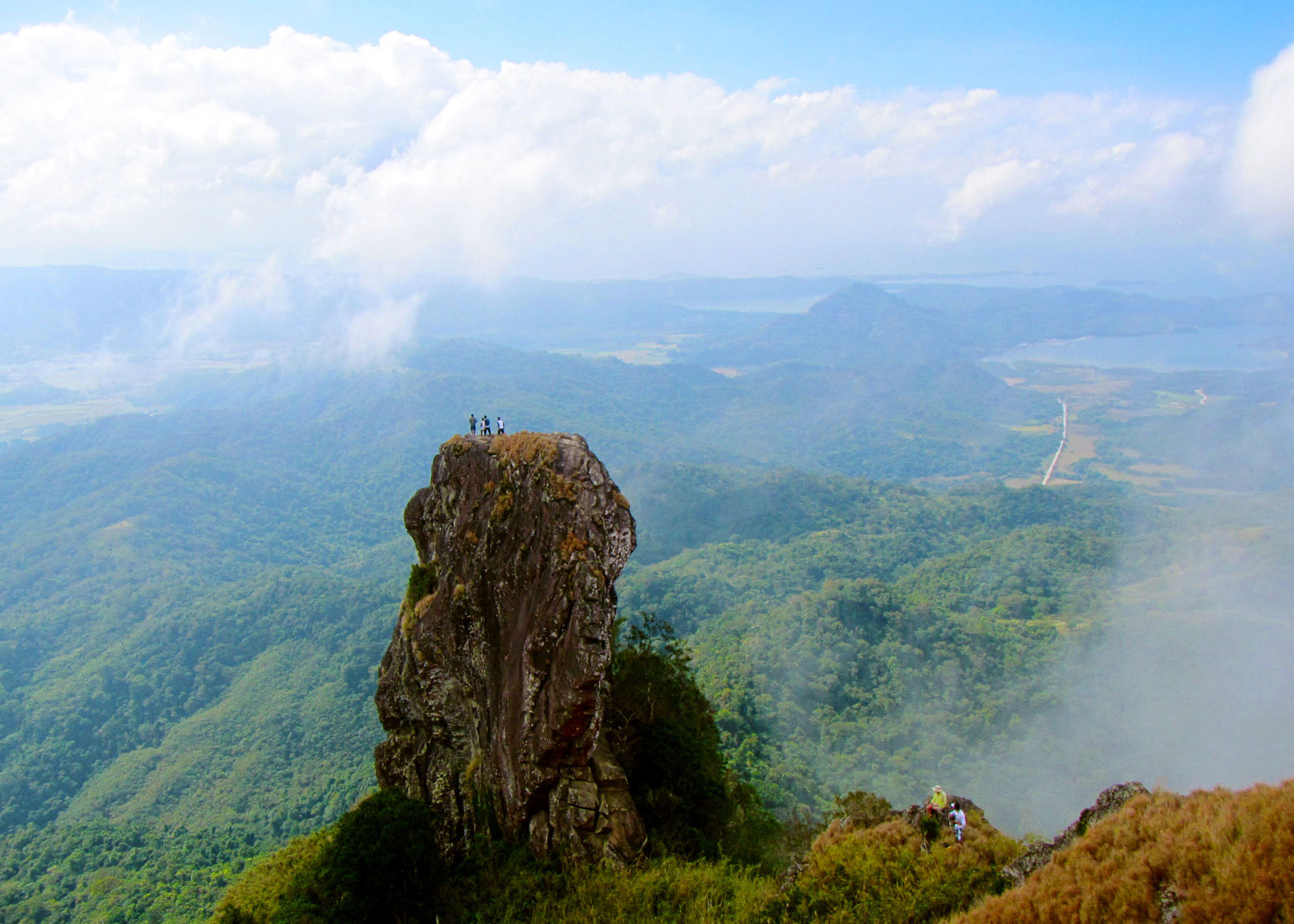
The popular hiking destination at Cavite; Mount Pico De Loro and its monolith

Mountain climbing is also one of the outdoor activities in Cavite. This includes Mount Pico De Loro which is within the towns of Ternate and Maragondon (and some parts of it are already part of Batangas), which is a part of the Palay-Palay and Mataas na Gulod protected landscape. Mt. Pico De Loro is the highest part of Cavite at 664 meters above sea level and is noted for its 360-degree view at its summit and a cliff known as Parrot's Beak or Monolith that mountaineers would also like to climb. Mt. Marami, within the same mountain range, located at Magallanes town is also a mountaineering location due to its "silyang bato" (en. Chair of rocks) at its summit.

There are twenty-two accredited tourism establishments and three accredited tour guides as well as packages being arranged with the Department of Tourism.

== Transportation ==
During the Spanish colonial period, Cavite hosted the principal port of Manila and served as the country's gateway to the world.

In the mid-19th century, Cavite, particularly the Cavite Peninsula in the north, was a stop for ships from South America before free trade opened up.

=== Roads ===
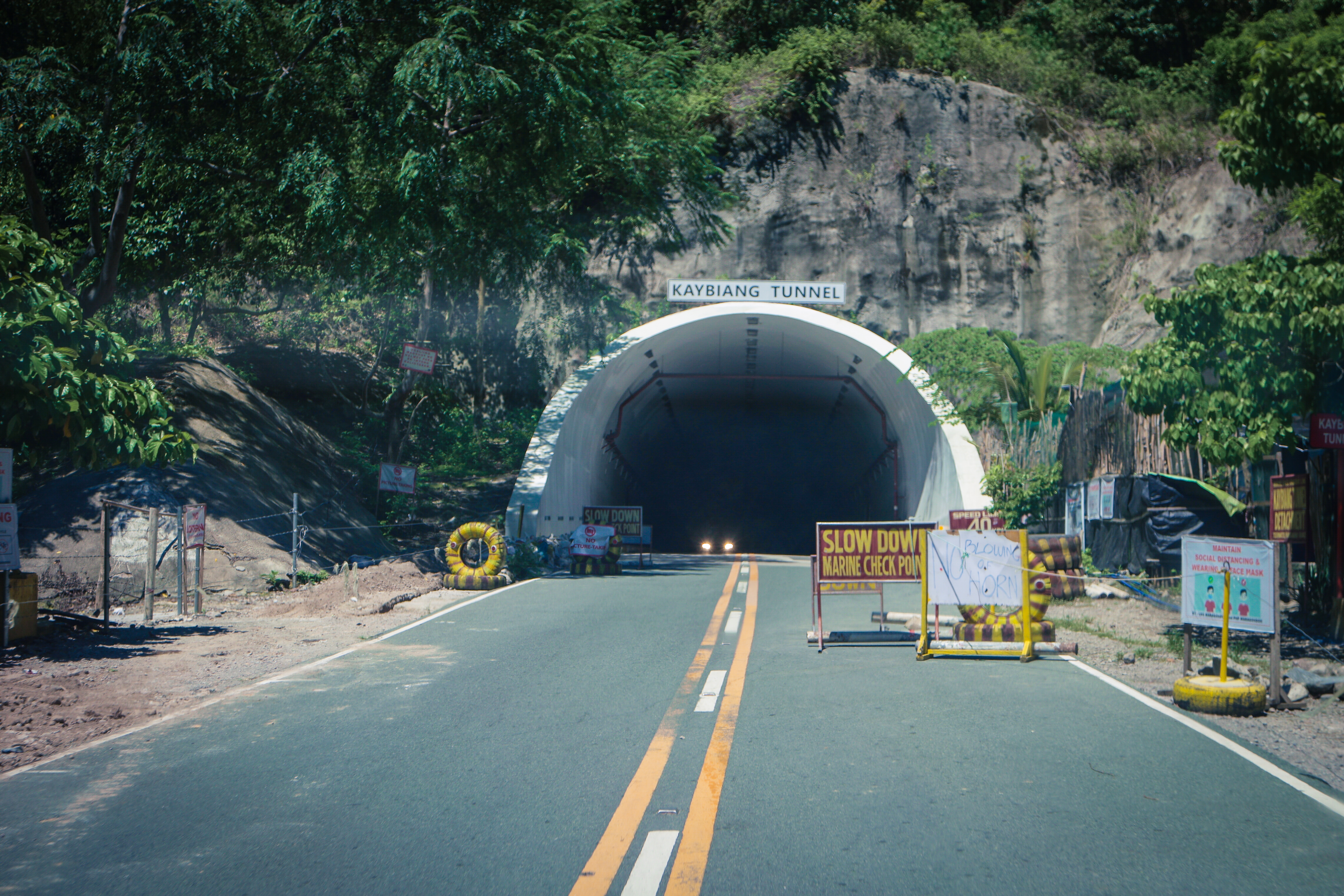
Kaybiang Tunnel

Cavite's total road network comprises roughly 1,973 kilometers (1,226 mi). Of these, the 407.7-kilometer (253.3 mi) national roads are mostly paved with concrete or asphalt and are relatively in good condition with some portions in need of rehabilitation. Provincial roads stretches to an approximate total length of 335.1 kilometers (208.2 mi). Most of these roads are concrete, some are paved with asphalt and the rest remain gravel roads. Majority of the municipal/city roads are paved with concrete, while barangay roads consist of 46.7% concrete and asphalt roads and 53.3% earth and gravel roads.

There are three main highways traversing the province: Aguinaldo Highway runs in a general north–south direction which includes the Tagaytay–Nasugbu Highway segment in the south; the Governor's Drive runs in a general east–west direction; the Antero Soriano Highway runs within the coastal towns on the northwest. The existing road length computed in terms of road density with respect to population at the standard of 2.4 kilometers (1.5 mi) per 1,000 population has a deficit of 3,532.71 kilometers (2,195.12 mi).

In 1985, the tolled Cavite Expressway (CAVITEX) was opened, which lessened the heavy volume of vehicles on Aguinaldo Highway in Bacoor. This project decreased the traffic congestion in Aguinaldo Highway in Bacoor, so travel time from Imus to Baclaran/Pasay is lessened to only one hour.

In 2013, the Kaybiang Tunnel, the country's longest underground highway tunnel at 300 meters (980 ft) was opened along the Ternate–Nasugbu Road piercing through Mt. Pico De Loro's north ridge, and shortens the travel time from Manila to the western coves of Cavite and Nasugbu, Batangas.

Currently, Cavite province is served by three Department of Public Works and Highways offices: Cavite 1st, Cavite 2nd and Cavite Sub District Engineering Offices.

=== Baby bus of Cavite ===
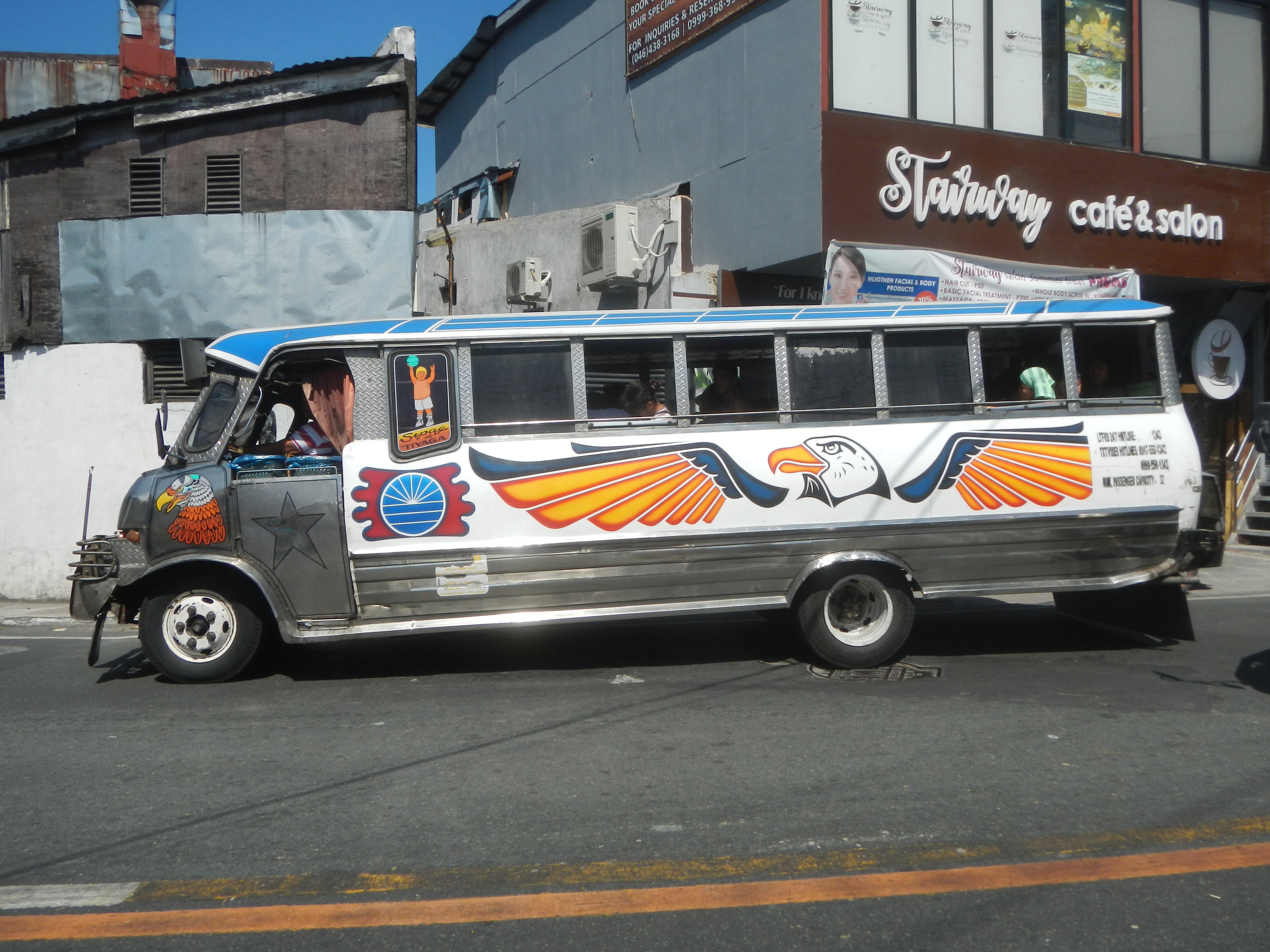
A baby bus in Kawit

Minibuses, popularly known as baby buses are a distinctive mode of public transportation in Cavite, particularly in the western side known for its customized bodywork that is similar to the traditional jeepney. Baby buses operated routes linking Zapote in Bacoor and Las Piñas with Cavite City, Rosario, Tanza, and other municipalities. A typical baby bus accommodates approximately 30 passengers.

Believed to have been introduced during the 1970s, baby buses become part of Cavite's culture when it comes to transportation.

In 2013, the Land Transportation Franchising and Regulatory Board (LTFRB) announced plans to phase out traditional baby buses, stating their age and safety concerns, as well as their impact on road traffic. While some drivers and operators initially believed that only the chassis would be replaced, the LTFRB clarified that the entire vehicle would have to be replaced. The planned phase-out was not fully implemented. In 2022, Cavite representative Jolo Revilla appealed to the Department of Transportation to retain baby buses in the province, describing them as one of Cavite's primary modes of public transportation and raising concerns over the livelihood of drivers and operators.

=== Proposed/ongoing transportation projects ===
==== Sangley International Airport ====
The Department of Transportation had "no objection" to an offer building a ₱508-billion airport complex on reclaimed land in Sangley Point. The upcoming international airport was pursued as a joint venture between investors, including Chinese enterprises, and the Cavite LGU.

==== Cavite–Laguna Expressway ====
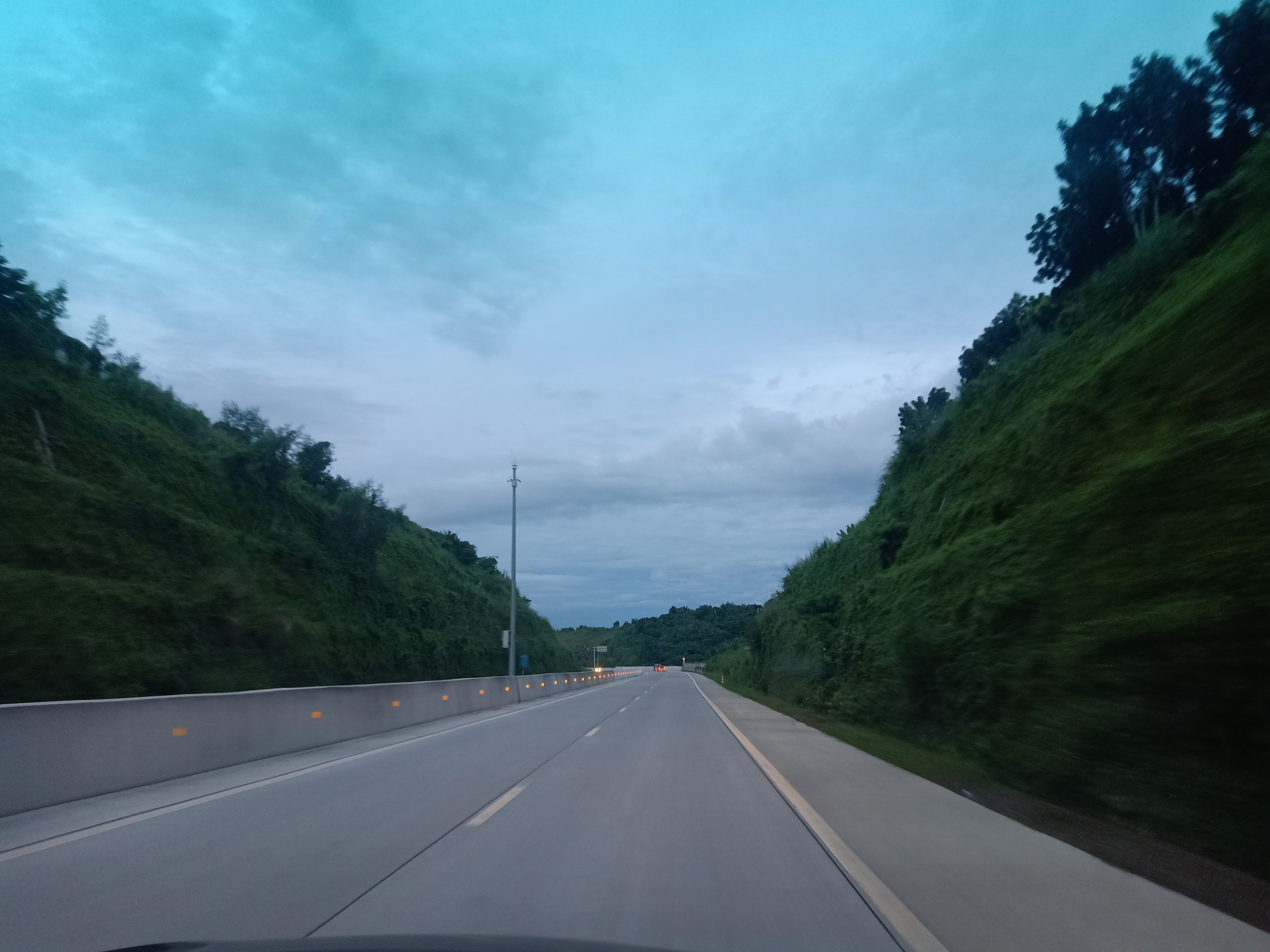
Cavite–Laguna Expressway in Silang

The Cavite–Laguna Expressway (CALAX) is an expressway that will cross the provinces of Cavite and Laguna. The construction of the four-lane 44-kilometer (27 mi) long expressway will connect CAVITEX in Kawit to South Luzon Expressway (SLEX) in Biñan, Laguna. When constructed, it is expected to ease the traffic in the Cavite–Laguna region, particularly in Aguinaldo Highway, Santa Rosa–Tagaytay Road and Governor's Drive. As of 2026, it is partially operational from Biñan to General Trias, Cavite.

==== LRT Line 1 Cavite Extension Project ====
The LRT Line 1 South Extension Project or Cavite Extension Project, through southern Metro Manila to the Province of Cavite has been identified as an integral link of the Rail Transit Network by the Metro Manila Urban Transportation Integration Study (MMUTIS), and the extension project was originally planned as the first litratation of Line 6 in the 1990s. It is one of the priority projects of the Department of Transportation and Communications (DOTC, now the Department of Transportation) and LRTA. It is also a flagship project of the Office of the President.

The project aims to expand the existing LRT Line 1 service southward to the cities of Parañaque, Las Piñas and the city of Bacoor in Cavite. The 11.7-kilometer (7.3 mi) route of the light railway system that will start from Baclaran to Niog was planned to carry a capacity of 40,000 passengers per direction per hour. A groundbreaking ceremony for LRT Line 1 South Extension Project was held on May 4, 2017 and construction started on May 7, 2019 after the right-of-way was "free and clear" of obstructions. Once it is fully operational, Cavite will be served by the LRT-1 (via Niog station).

As of April 30, 2024, phase 1 is 98.2% complete. Department of Transportation Executive Assistant Jonathan Gesmundo announced the construction of 8 additional stations to the current 20 LRT-1 stations with operations of LRT-1 Cavite Extension Phase 1 are expected by mid-November 2024. Meanwhile, phases 2 and 3 will begin operations by 2031. This is one of the three rapid transit line projects outside Metro Manila. The said project will serve approximately 1.9 million commuters in Pasay, Parañaque, Las Piñas, and Bacoor.

==== LRT Line 6 Project ====
The proposed LRT Line 6 project would further extend the LRT system by another 19 kilometers all the way to Dasmariñas from the proposed end in Niog in Bacoor, Cavite.

The mass transit system would pass along the Aguinaldo Highway and would have stations in Niog, Tirona station, Imus station, Daang Hari station, Salitran station, Congressional Avenue station, and Governor's Drive station. The project will improve passenger mobility and reduce the volume of vehicular traffic in the Cavite area by providing a higher capacity mass transit system. It also aims to spur economic development along the extension corridor.

When the original project was shelved in 2018, a similar proposal was submitted by Prime Asset Ventures Inc., and its chairman, Manny Villar, proposed a 47.2-kilometer railway system that links the southern Metro Manila to the major cities in Cavite.

== Government ==
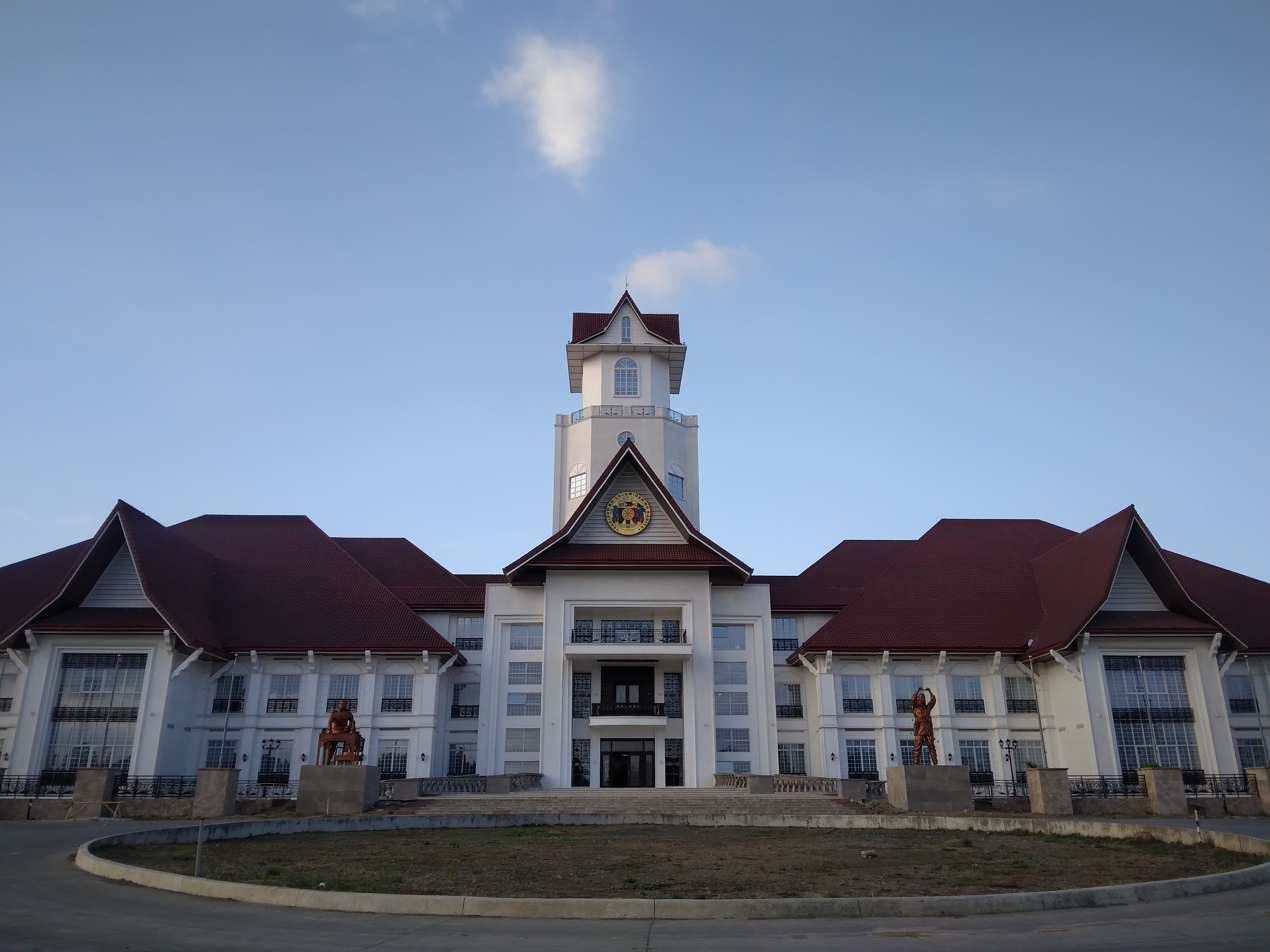
The new Cavite Provincial Capitol, the seat of the provincial government, in Trece Martires.

=== Governor ===
- Francisco Gabriel D. Remulla (NUP)

=== Vice Governor ===
- Ramon Vicente H. Bautista (Lakas-CMD)

=== Board members ===
District	Member (party)	Member (party)
1st	Romel R. Enriquez (Lakas-CMD)	Juan Ysrael R. Gandia (Lakas-CMD)
2nd	Edwin E. Malvar (Lakas-CMD)	Alde Joselito F. Pagulayan (Lakas-CMD)
3rd	Arnel Cantimbuhan (NUP)	Lloyd Emman D. Jaro (NUP)
4th	Nickanor N. Austria Jr. (NUP)	Joy G. dela Cuesta (NUP)
5th	Aidel Paul G. Belamide (NUP)	Ivee Jayne A. Reyes (NUP)
6th	Kerby J. Salazar Jr. (NUP)	Maurito C. Sison (NUP)
7th	Jhon Kester Aldrin R. Anacan (NUP)	Camille Lauren Del Rosario (AKSYON)
8th	Jasmin Angelli M. Bautista (NPC)	Eimeren M. Nazareno (NUP)

=== Ex-officio members ===
Position	Member (party)
Provincial Councilor League	Edward R. Samala, Jr. (Kawit) (Lakas)
Liga ng mga Barangay	Rafael Paterno, III (Bacoor)
SK Provincial Federation	Chelsea Jillian Sarno (Imus)

=== House of Representatives ===
District	Representative	Party
1st District	Ramon "Jolo" Revilla III	Lakas-CMD
2nd District (Bacoor)	Lani Mercado	Lakas-CMD
3rd District (Imus)	Adrian Jay C. Advincula	NUP
4th District (Dasmariñas)	Jenny Barzaga	NUP
5th District (CarSiGMA)	Roy M. Loyola	NPC
6th District (General Trias)	Antonio A. Ferrer	NUP
7th District	Crispin Diego D. Remulla	NUP
8th District	Aniela Bianca Tolentino	NUP

== Notable people ==
=== National heroes and patriots ===
- Emilio Aguinaldo, First President of the Philippines
- Mariano Álvarez, Philippine Revolutionary General
- Mariano Trias, Philippine Revolutionary General
- Pascual Álvarez, Philippine Revolutionary General
- Santiago Álvarez, Philippine Revolutionary General
- Baldomero Aguinaldo, Philippine Revolutionary General
- Crispulo Aguinaldo, Philippine Revolutionary General
- Licerio Topacio, Philippine Revolutionary General
- Tomás Mascardo, Philippine Revolutionary General
- Mariano Noriel, served as general under Emilio Aguinaldo's revolutionary army during the 1896 Philippine Revolution
- José Tagle, Filipino military officer who participated in the Battle of Imus during the Philippine Revolution.
- Julián Felipe, composer of the Philippine National Anthem and Reina de Cavite
- Román Basa, Second president of the Katipunan
- Ladislao Diwa, one of the founders of Katipunan
- Thirteen Martyrs of Cavite, Filipino patriots
- Felipe Calderón y Roca, lawyer, considered the Father of the Malolos Constitution
- Mariano Castañeda, Cavite Governor 1944, General of the Filipino-American Cavite Guerilla Forces FACGF the liberators of Cavite during the Japanese Occupation and Chief of Staff of the Armed Forces of the Philippines in 1947.

=== Science and education ===
- Olivia Salamanca, Filipino physician who trained in the United States at the Woman's Medical College of Pennsylvania in Philadelphia and was the second female physician from the Philippines.
- Paulo C. Campos, National Scientist of the Philippines for Nuclear Medicine
- Hilario Lara, National Scientist of the Philippines for Public Health
- Jose R. Velasco, National Scientist of the Philippines for Plant Physiology
- Lourdes J. Cruz, National Scientist of the Philippines for Biochemistry
- Francisca Tirona, educator, humanitarian, civic leader, and administrator, and co-founder of the Philippine Women's University.
- Nemesio Prudente, educator, political activist, and human rights defender revered for serving as President of the Polytechnic University of the Philippines.

=== Literature and the arts ===
- Pascual H. Poblete, revolutionary and writer
- Alejandro G. Abadilla, poet, Father of Modern Philippine Poetry
- Rogelio Ordoñez, multi-awarded Filipino fiction writer, poet, activist, journalist and educator
- Efren Abueg, novelist, short story writer, essayist, fictionist
- Fidel Rillo, poet, editor, book designer
- Mars Ravelo, graphic novelist
- Eros Atalia, author, professor and journalist
- Wilfredo Alicdan, artist
- George Canseco, composer, songwriter
- Josefino Cenizal, composer
- Yasmin Sison-Ching, artist

=== Religion ===
- Cardinal Luis Antonio Tagle, Archbishop of Manila (December 12, 2011–February 9, 2020), Bishop of Imus (December 12, 2001–December 12, 2011), Pro-Prefect for the Section of First Evangelization of the Dicastery for Evangelization (February 9, 2020–present)
- Archbishop Rolando Joven Tria Tirona, Archbishop Emeritus of Caceres, Bishop-Prelate Emeritus of Infanta and former Bishop of Malolos
- Bishop Cirilo Almario, Second Bishop of Malolos
- Bishop Rufino Sescon, fifth Bishop of Balanga (March 1, 2025–present)

=== Politics and government ===
- Cesar Virata, former Prime Minister of the Philippines
- Serafin R. Cuevas, 106th Associate Justice of the Supreme Court and 50th Secretary of Justice
- Jose Portugal Perez, 167th Associate Justice of the Supreme Court
- Jose C. Mendoza, 168th Associate Justice of the Supreme Court
- Antero Soriano, former senator and former Cavite governor
- Justiniano S. Montano, former senator and representative of the 6th District of Cavite
- Pablo Gomez Sarino, former and longest serving municipal mayor of Bacoor, Cavite (1959-1963, 1967-1986)
- Ramon Revilla Sr., actor and former Senator
- Risa Hontiveros, Senator, former Akbayan representative
- Panfilo Lacson, Senator and 7th Chief of the Philippine National Police
- Bong Revilla, actor, Senator, former Cavite governor, and vice governor
- Francis Tolentino, Senator, former Metropolitan Manila Development Authority chairman and mayor of Tagaytay
- Manuel Earnshaw, former Resident Commissioner to the U.S. House of Representatives from the Philippine Islands
- Leonides Sarao Virata, 15th Secretary of Trade and Industry
- Epimaco Velasco, 16th Secretary of the Interior and Local Government, former NBI director and former Cavite governor
- Joseph Emilio Abaya, former Secreyary of Transportation and former representative of the 1st District of Cavite
- Irineo "Ayong" Maliksi, PCSO chairman, former Representative of the 3rd District of Cavite, former Cavite Governor and former City Mayor of Imus
- Leon Guinto, former mayor of the City of Manila during the Japanese occupation
- Lani Mercado, actress, Bacoor city mayor and former representative of the 2nd congressional district of Cavite
- Gilbert Remulla, TV host, news anchor, reporter, former representative of the 1st congressional district of Cavite
- Strike Revilla, Representative 2nd District of Cavite, former councilor & mayor of Bacoor, former Cavite board member & former PCSO chairman
- Abraham Tolentino, politician, sportsperson
- Jesus Crispin Remulla, 60th Secretary of Justice and the currently the 7th Ombudsman of the Philippines
- Jonvic Remulla, Secretary of the Interior and Local Government and former Cavite governor

=== Philanthropy ===
- Efren Peñaflorida, CNN Hero of the Year for 2009.
- Luis Yangco, Filipino-Chinese businessman and philanthropist

=== Entertainment ===
- Leopoldo Salcedo, actor
- Celeste Legaspi, singer, actress
- Onyok Pineda, child actor
- Bayani Agbayani, comedian, TV host
- Jasmine Trias, singer; American Idol 3rd runner up
- Kokoy De Santos, actor, comedian
- George Canseco, composer
- Louise delos Reyes, actress
- Bella Santiago, singer
- Christian Bables, actor
- Kaye Abad, actress
- Nash Aguas, actor and Star Circle Kid Quest grand winner
- Arra San Agustin, actress
- Christian Bautista, singer, actor, and host
- Miguel Tanfelix, actor
- Bugoy Cariño, child actor
- Olivia Cenizal, actress
- Lyca Gairanod, The Voice Kids (Philippines season 1) champion
- Seth Fedelin, actor
- Roxanne Guinoo, actress and Star Circle Teen Quest finalist
- Diether Ocampo, actor, singer, and model
- Sugar Mercado, actress, former SexBomb Girls member
- Marcelito Pomoy, singer, Pilipinas Got Talent grand winner
- Marian Rivera, actress
- Bianca Gonzalez, TV host
- Angela Ken, singer-songwriter
- Pablo (formerly Sejun) Leader/Member of P-Pop Group SB19
- Elle Villanueva, actress and dancer
- Dia Maté, singer and Reina Hispanoamericana 2025
- Will Ashley, actor and singer
- Ralph de Leon, actor, model, host, and judoka
- Chlaui Malayao, child actress
- Joy Barcoma, beauty queen, host, and comedian
- Kira Balinger, actress and performer
- Kate Valdez, actress and model
- Xander Ford, influencer
- Brace Arquiza, actor and dancer

=== Sports ===
- Wesley So, chess grandmaster and 8th youngest chess grandmaster in history
- Joseph Eric Buhain, swimmer, chairman of the Games and Amusements Board
- Terrence Romeo, professional basketball player in the Philippine Basketball Association (PBA). Former college player for the FEU Tamaraws
- Ranidel de Ocampo, former professional basketball player in the Philippine Basketball Association, currently an assistant coach for the TNT Tropang 5G
- Yancy de Ocampo, former professional basketball player

=== Others ===
- Leonardo Manicio, aka Nardong Putik Filipino gangster turned folk hero
- Boss Toyo, filipino rapper, collector, vlogger; knowing popular as "Pinoy Pawnstar"
- RJ Crusem, a Filipino computer engineer, technologist, transportation systems developer, and the creator of TrainSight, a commuter information platform developed to provide train location and arrival estimates for Metro Manila’s railway systems.
