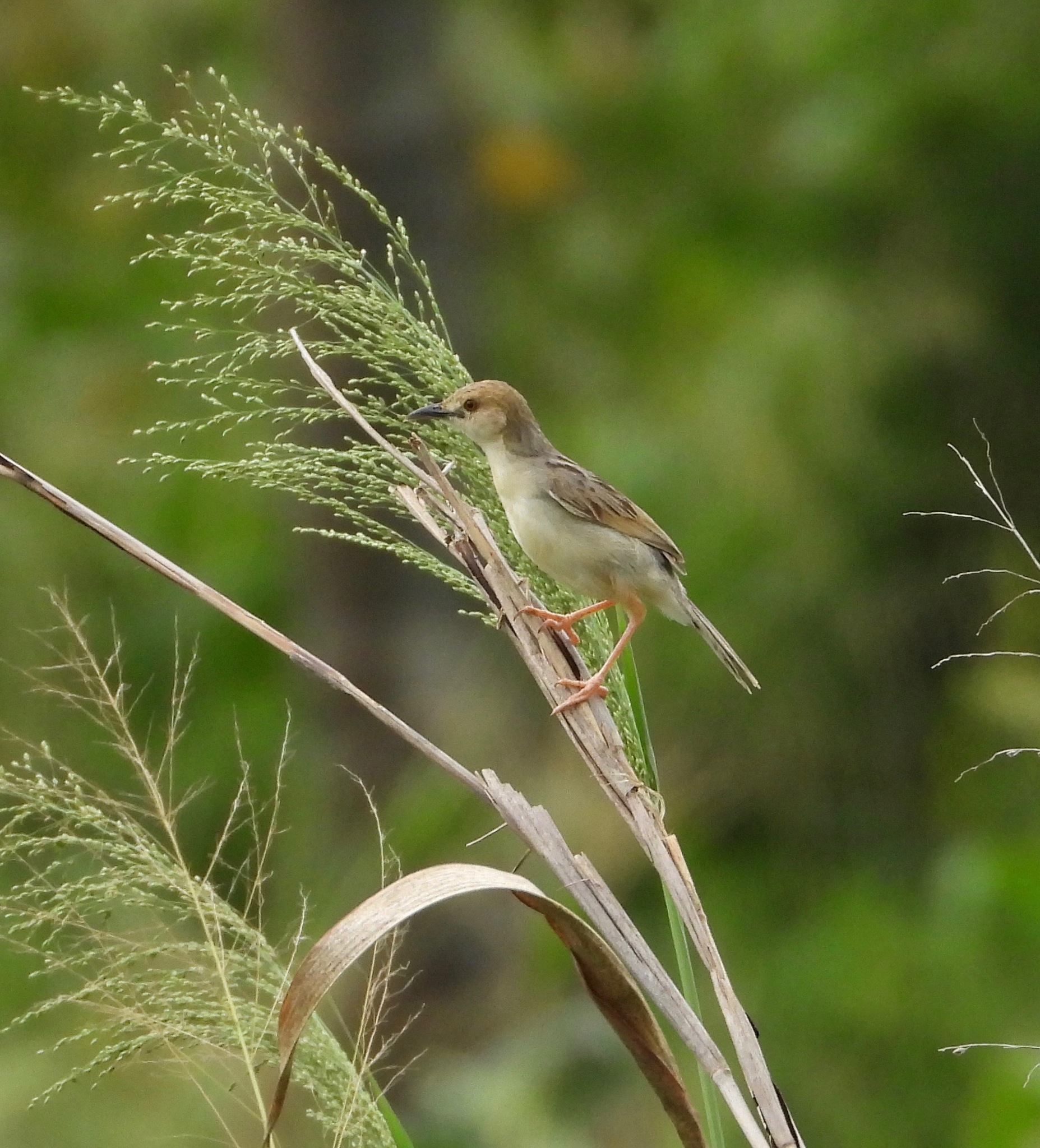

Conservation status
- Least Concern (IUCN 3.1)

Scientific classification
- Kingdom: Animalia
- Phylum: Chordata
- Class: Aves
- Order: Passeriformes
- Family: Cisticolidae
- Genus: Cisticola
- Species: C. haematocephalus

Binomial name
- Cisticola haematocephalus Cabanis, 1868

= Coastal cisticola =

Species of bird

The coastal cisticola (Cisticola haematocephalus), also known as the umbabird, is a species of bird in the family Cisticolidae. It is found on the coastal plain of East Africa.

Alternate common names are Mombasa black-backed cisticola.

== Taxonomy ==
The coastal cisticola is monotypic. This taxon was split from the winding cisticola by the IOC and HBW, as were the rufous-winged cisticola, Luapula cisticola and Ethiopian cisticola. The Clements (2017) and Howard and Moore (2014) world lists consider these taxa as a single species, the winding cisticola C. galactotes (sensu lato).

== Distribution and habitat ==
This species is found on the coastal plain of East Africa between 5°N to 10°S (southern Somalia to north-eastern Tanzania).

Its natural habitats are tropical seasonally wet or flooded lowland grassland and swamps.
