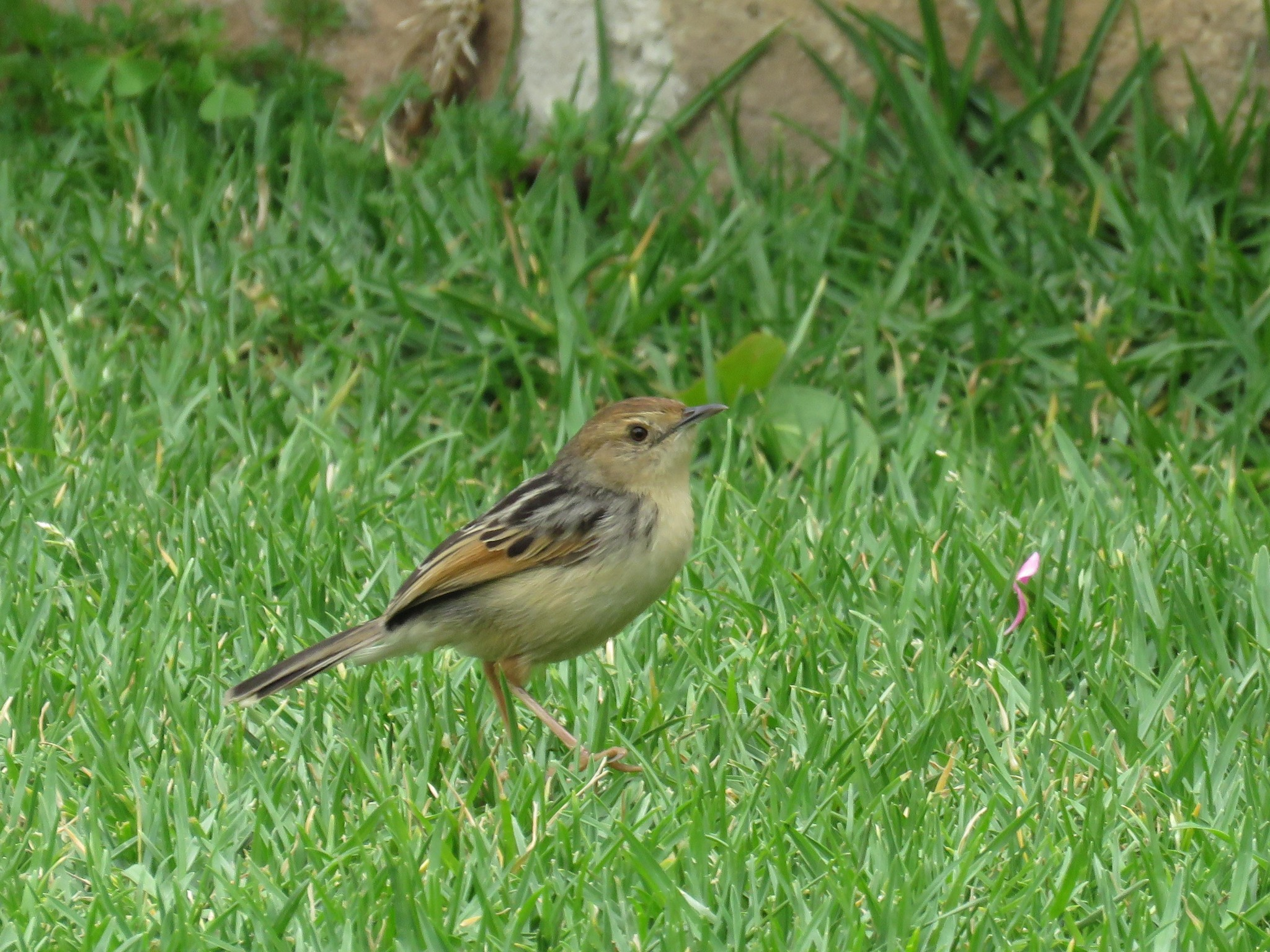

Conservation status
- Least Concern (IUCN 3.1)

Scientific classification
- Kingdom: Animalia
- Phylum: Chordata
- Class: Aves
- Order: Passeriformes
- Family: Cisticolidae
- Genus: Cisticola
- Species: C. lugubris

Binomial name
- Cisticola lugubris (Rüppell, 1840)

= Ethiopian cisticola =

Species of bird

The Ethiopian cisticola (Cisticola lugubris) is a species of bird in the family Cisticolidae.

Alternate common names are Abyssinian black-backed cisticola, and winding cisticola (Ethiopian) (eBird).

== Taxonomy ==
The Ethiopian cisticola is monotypic. This taxon was split from the winding cisticola by the IOC and HBW, as were the rufous-winged cisticola, Luapula cisticola and coastal cisticola. The Clements (2017) and Howard and Moore (2014) world lists consider these taxa as a single species, the winding cisticola C. galactotes (sensu lato).

== Distribution and habitat ==
This species is found in the highlands of Ethiopia and Eritrea.

Its natural habitats are tropical seasonally wet or flooded grassland and swamps.
