= Mount Batulao =

Inactive stratovolcano in Luzon, Philippines

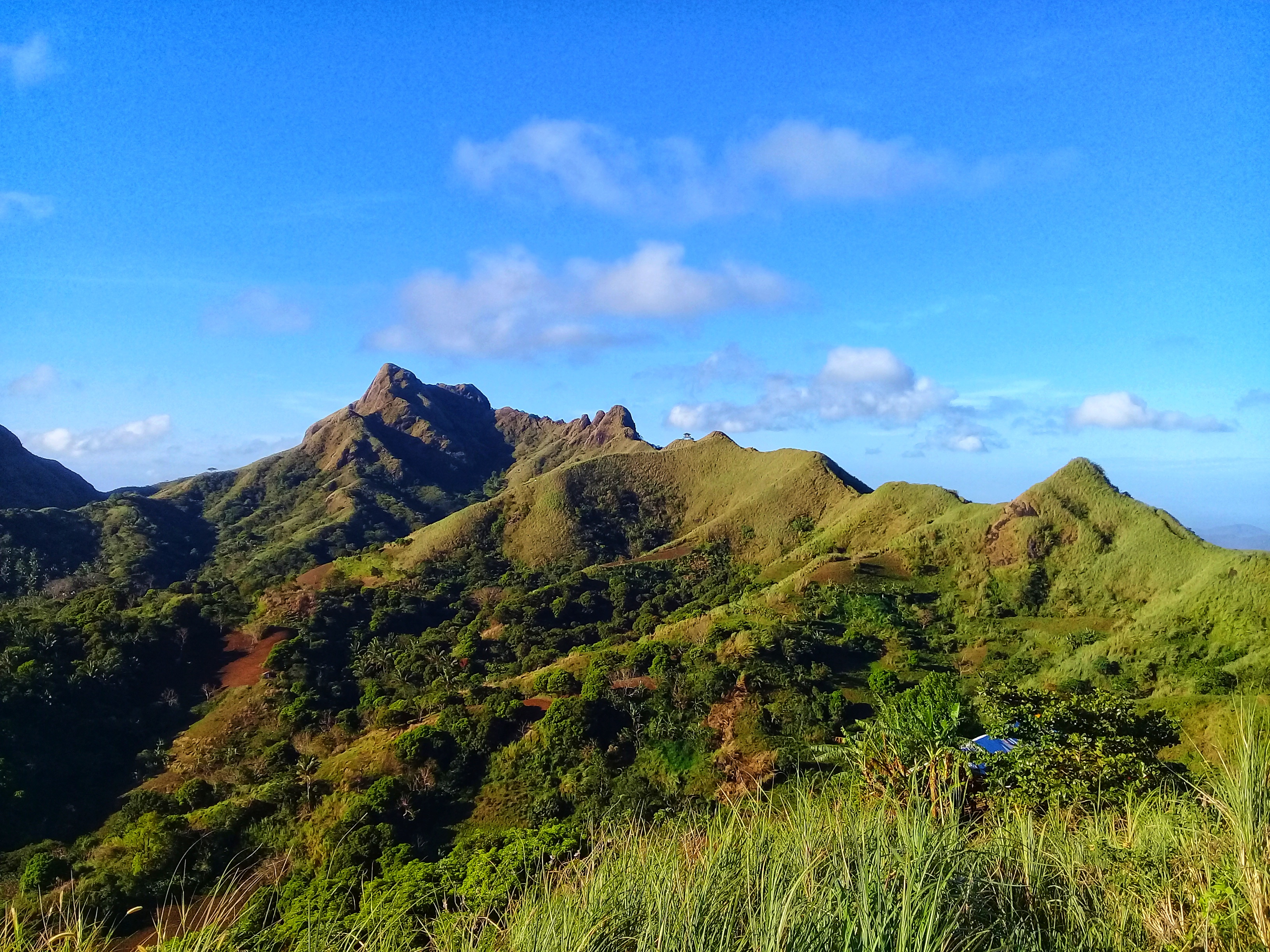
- Mount Batulao summit showing its rugged slopes and ridges

Highest point
- Elevation: 2,661 ft (811 m)
- Prominence: 2,165 ft (660 m)
- Listing: List of inactive volcanoes in the Philippines
- Coordinates: 14°2′42″N 120°48′16″E

Geography
- Location within Luzon Location within Philippines
- An interactive map of Mount Batulao (large brown marker) and Taal Caldera (red marker).
- Country: Philippines
- Region: Calabarzon
- Province: Batangas; Cavite
- Parent range: Tagaytay Ridge

Geology
- Rock age: Pliocene
- Mountain type: Stratovolcano
- Volcanic zone: Western Bataan Lineament
- Last eruption: Unknown

Mount Batulao is an inactive stratovolcano in the Calabarzon region of the Philippines, located in northwest Batangas province along its border with Cavite. It is a flank dissected andesitic stratovolcano at the northwestern rim of the Taal Volcano which began to form in the late Pliocene period, about 3.4 million years ago. The mountain is a prominent landmark of jagged peaks, rolling to rugged ridges and deep gorges situated just west of the hill station of Tagaytay at the southwestern end of the Tagaytay Ridge. It is well known for its scenery, as well as its retreat centers and resorts located just 85 kilometres (53 mi) south of Manila.

== Name ==
The name Batulao comes from a contraction of the Tagalog phrase bato sa ilaw or ilaw sa dalawang bato (illuminated rocks) in reference to the phenomenon that takes place at the mountain in December when the sun's rays come out from between the mountain's two prominent peaks and light them up. Other sources say its name may have also been derived from a portmanteau of the Tagalog words bato (rock) and dilaw (yellow) referring to the mountain's color during sunrise.

== Geography ==
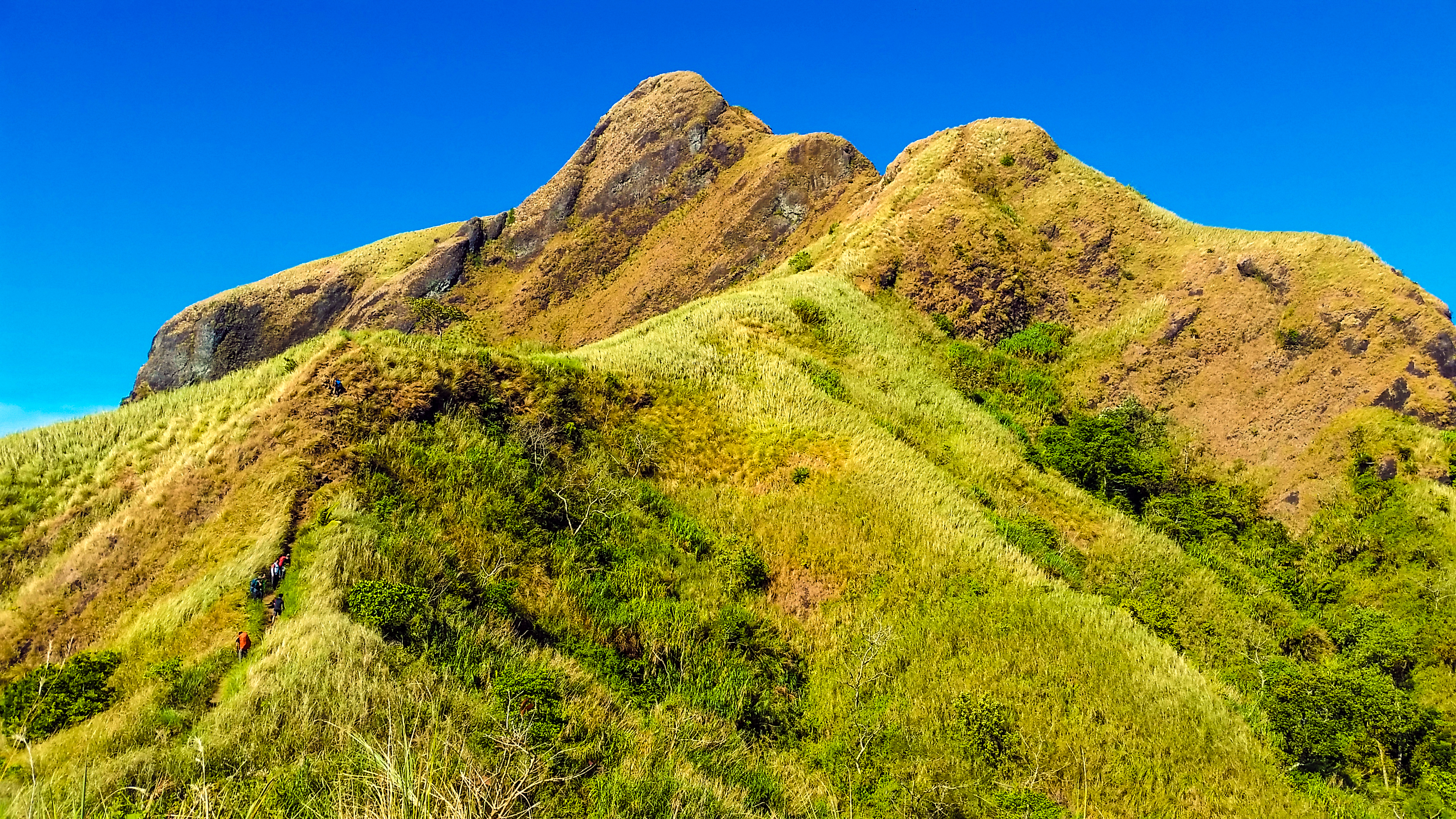
View of one of the mountain's twelve peaks

Mount Batulao rises to a height of 693 metres (2,274 ft) mostly within the municipality of Nasugbu. It forms the southwestern end of the Tagaytay Range, popularly known as the Tagaytay Ridge and historically as the Cordillera de Tagaytay, a high ridge of volcanic tuff which runs in a semi-circular direction for 32 kilometres (20 mi) to Mount Sungay in the northeast in Tagaytay overlooking the Taal Lake and Taal Volcano. The mountain contains twelve peaks including its two highest peaks for which it was named. The northern side of the mountain is administered as part of Nasugbu while to the east, its foothills extend to the Cavite municipality of Alfonso. Its southern and western slopes are shared with the municipalities of Tuy, Balayan, and Lemery, and the city of Calaca. Settlements include the upland barangays of Aga and Calayway (Kaylaway) in Nasugbu, Bolboc and Mataywanac in Tuy, Patugo in Balayan, Cahil in Calaca, Mayasang in Lemery and the Alfonso barangay of Kaysuyo.

The mountain is situated in the 185.9-square-kilometre (71.8 mi^{2}) Lian River Basin, a subcatchment of the Nasugbu-Lian-Calatagan Basin in the municipalities of Nasugbu, Lian, Tuy, Alfonso and Magallanes. It contains the headwaters of the Lian-Palico River, which flow down from the steep slopes of Mount Batulao and the 656-metre (2,152 ft) high Mount Carilao through mostly secondary growth forest and sugarcane plantations before discharging to Nasugbu Bay of the South China Sea. This river has a total length of 34 kilometres (21 mi) and produces an average annual discharge of 19.44 million cubic metres (687 million cu ft). The Montintubig (Munting Tubig), Obispo and Siomtiam rivers also have their source at Mount Batulao and drain into Balayan Bay.

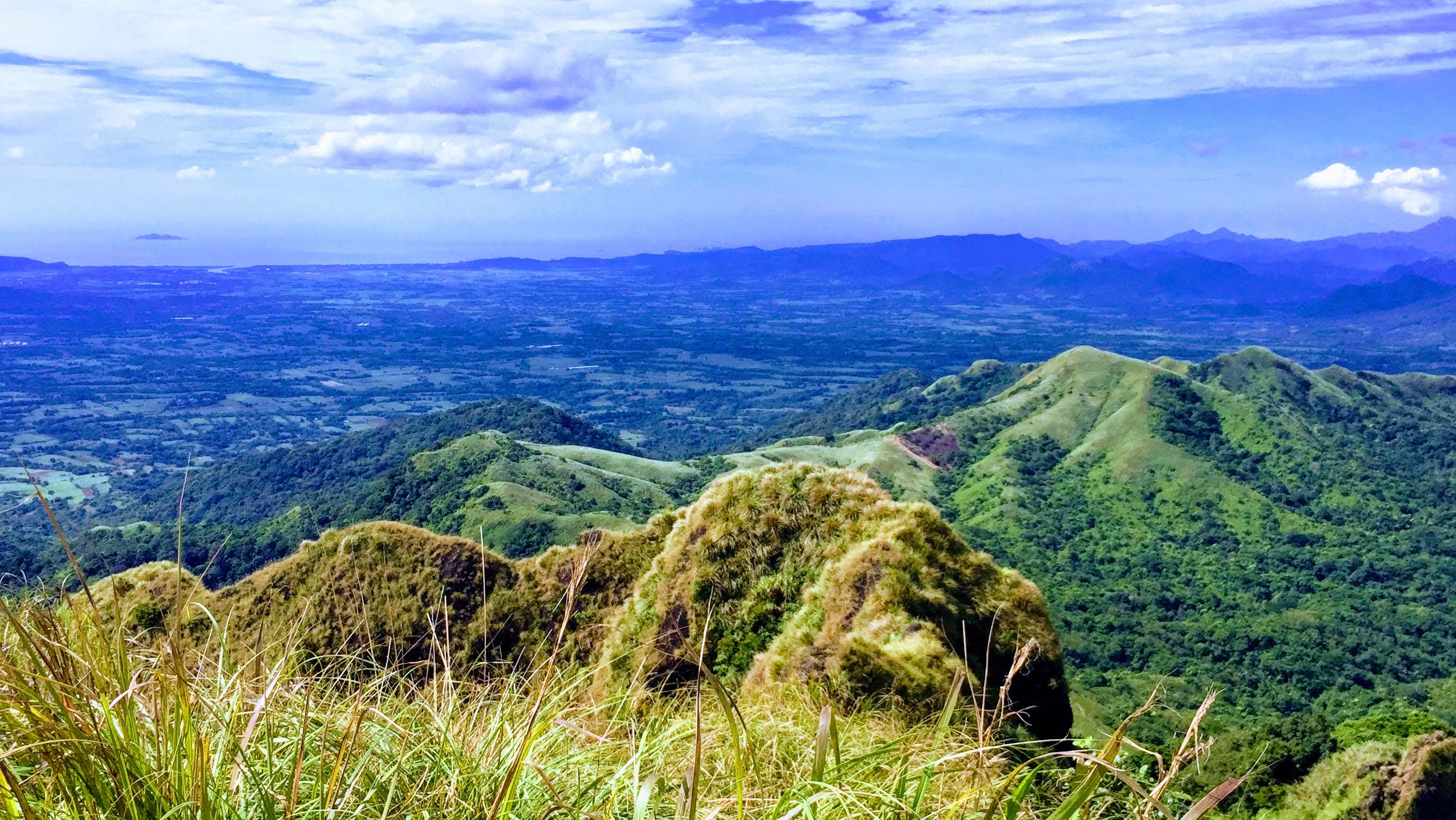
Mount Carilao and the Pico de Loro range as seen from the summit of Mount Batulao

Mount Carilao, sometimes spelled Cariliao and also known as Mount Talamitam, occupies the gap to the north between Batulao and the Mounts Palay-Palay–Mataas-na-Gulod mountain range (also known as Mount Pico de Loro range). This mountain at Nasugbu's border with the Cavite municipality of Magallanes is known as Batulao's younger sister and is also a popular hike for beginners. To the southeast of Mount Carilao is Mount Aiming, a sharp and bare mountain which rises 359 metres (1,178 ft). The three mountains form a defile through which the Tagaytay–Nasugbu Highway passes.

A large portion of the gap between the three mountains in Nasugbu is private property, most of which belongs to the 1,837-hectare (4,540-acre) Hacienda Puyat of Gonzalo Puyat & Sons and the 867-hectare (2,140-acre) Hacienda Caylaway of Roxas & Company. From an agricultural estate, the Puyat and Roxas family enterprises transformed portions of this side of Mount Batulao into a prime real estate and retirement destination, with several hotels, golf courses and condominium complexes. These developments are bordered by the Batulao Forest to the south.

== Geology ==
Mount Batulao is listed by the Global Volcanism Program as a flank dissected andesitic stratovolcano of Taal, along with the cones of Maculod, Makiling and Sungay. All of the cones mentioned above are inactive volcanoes. The age of Mount Batulao is based on the basalts and andesites deposits using K-Ar radiometric dating ranging from 3.4 to 1.34 Ma (Pliocene - Pleistocene). The basalt flows of the volcano have an average radiometric age of 2.9 Ma.

== Flora and fauna ==
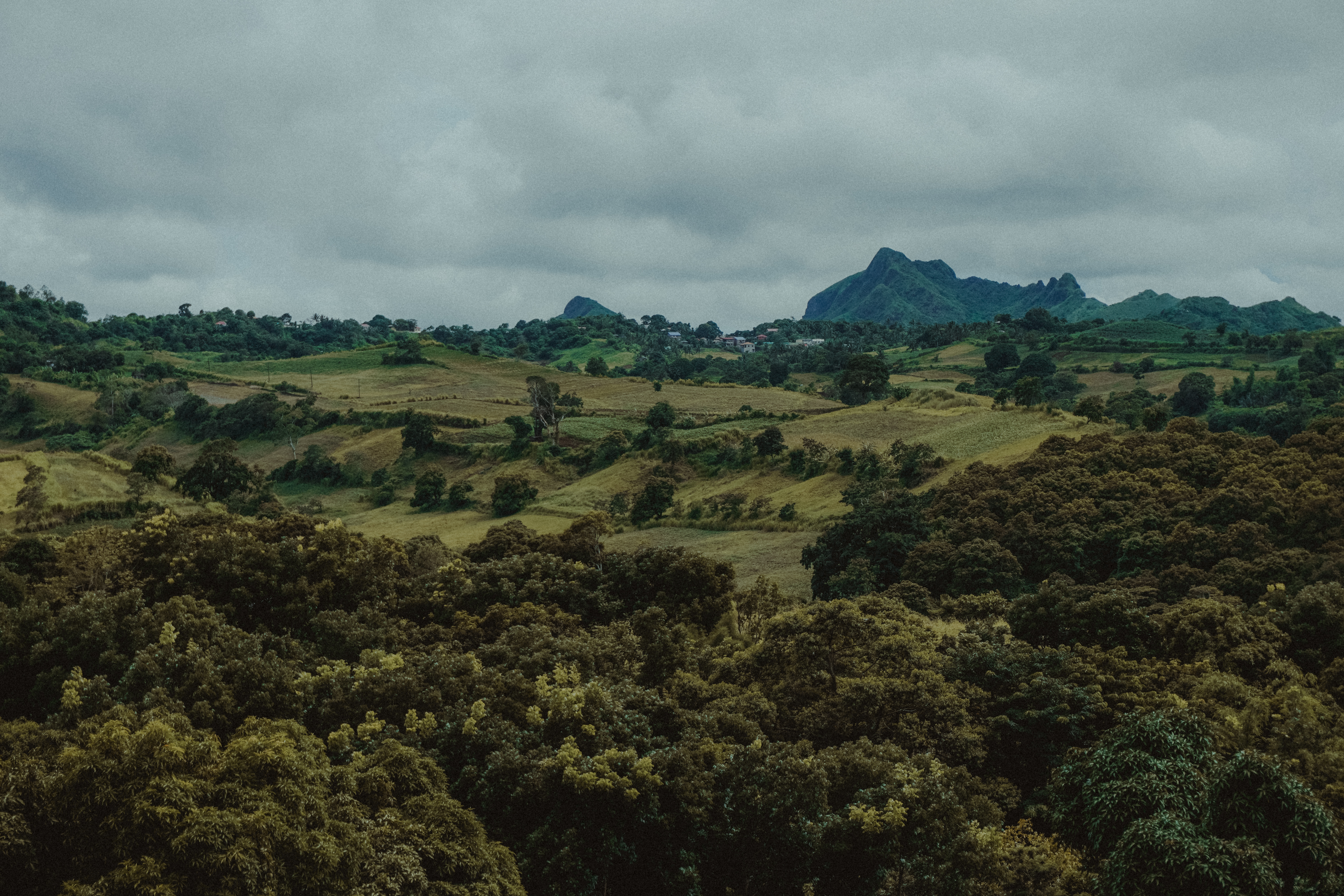
Mount Batulao overlooking Caleruega and Batulao Forest

Mount Batulao has a forest cover of 30,000 hectares (74,000 acres) in its middle to lower slopes in Nasugbu, Balayan and Calaca. It is a privately owned natural sanctuary with centuries-old trees extending to the valleys and gorges to the south. The secondary growth dipterocarp forest has areas of slash-and-burn agriculture planted with corn, banana, mangoes and other fruit trees. The patches of grassland and shrubland on the mountain are dominated by cogon grass and Kans grass, while its gently sloping foothills and flat areas are planted with different agricultural crops.

At least 22 bird species were recorded in and around the forest of Mount Batulao in 2004, the most common being the glossy swiftlet and barn swallow. The Wild Bird Club of the Philippines also documented the following avian residents of Batulao: blue-headed fantail, blue rock thrush, brown shrike, collared kingfisher, Philippine hanging parrot, elegant tit, long-tailed shrike, lowland white-eye, olive-backed sunbird, Philippine bulbul, Philippine coucal, Philippine fairy-bluebird, Philippine pygmy woodpecker, spotted wood kingfisher, striated grassbird, striated swallow, white-breasted woodswallow, white-browed shama, white-eared brown dove and yellow-vented bulbul.

== Hiking ==
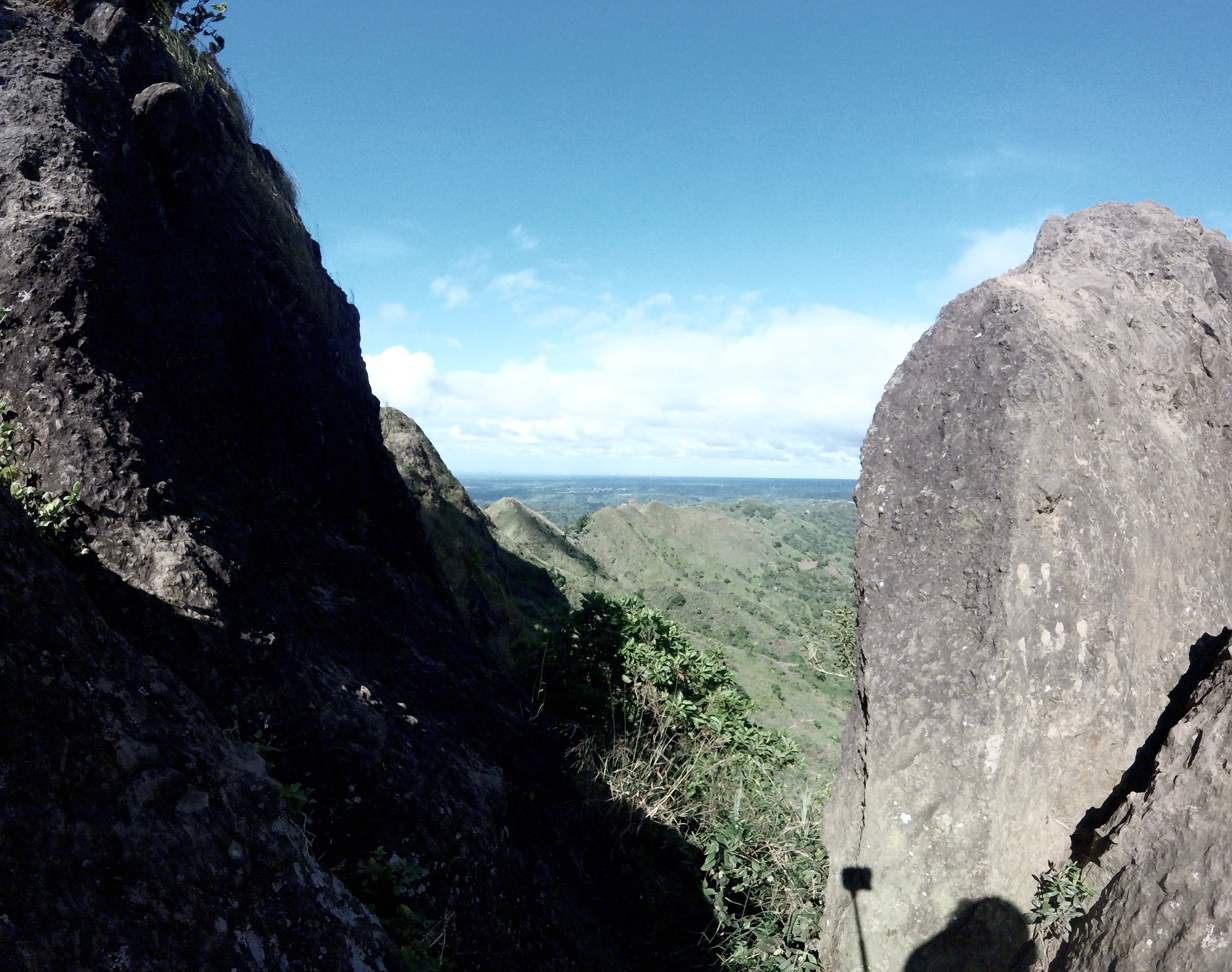
Huge boulders on the summit of Mount Batulao

Mount Batulao is a popular day hike, with Philippine hiking guide Pinoy Mountaineer rating it with a "4/9" difficulty score. The mountain is recommended for beginners because of its relatively low difficulty and impressive summit vistas. Its accessibility to Metro Manila and its cool climate, as well as proximity to the popular mountain resort city of Tagaytay, also make it a popular camping destination, with at least ten designated camp sites and basic facilities like water stations, makeshift shower areas at its base and even a convenience store selling buco juice at the junction of two trails.

All twelve peaks of Mount Batulao can be reached by ascending either the east or west route. East Trail, also known as the Old Trail, is the longer and more challenging route to the summit which can be accessed by trekking the rough road from the KC Hillcrest Hotel & Golf Club (formerly Evercrest) on the Tagaytay–Nasugbu Highway and turning left at a fork in the trail. It is a gradual ascent to the summit along mostly grassy slopes until camp site 8 where the steps become steep and wobbly. The newer trail to the west leads to a forested area as well as to the "Peak of Deception." Atop its summit is an image of Mary, mother of Jesus where Marian devotees hold healing sessions twice a year. Batulao's peaks are mostly rocky cliffs that offer panoramic views of the Taal Lake and Volcano, the Pico de Loro mountain range, the coves and beaches of Punta Fuego and Calatagan, and as far south as Mount Macolod and Balayan Bay.

== Recreation ==
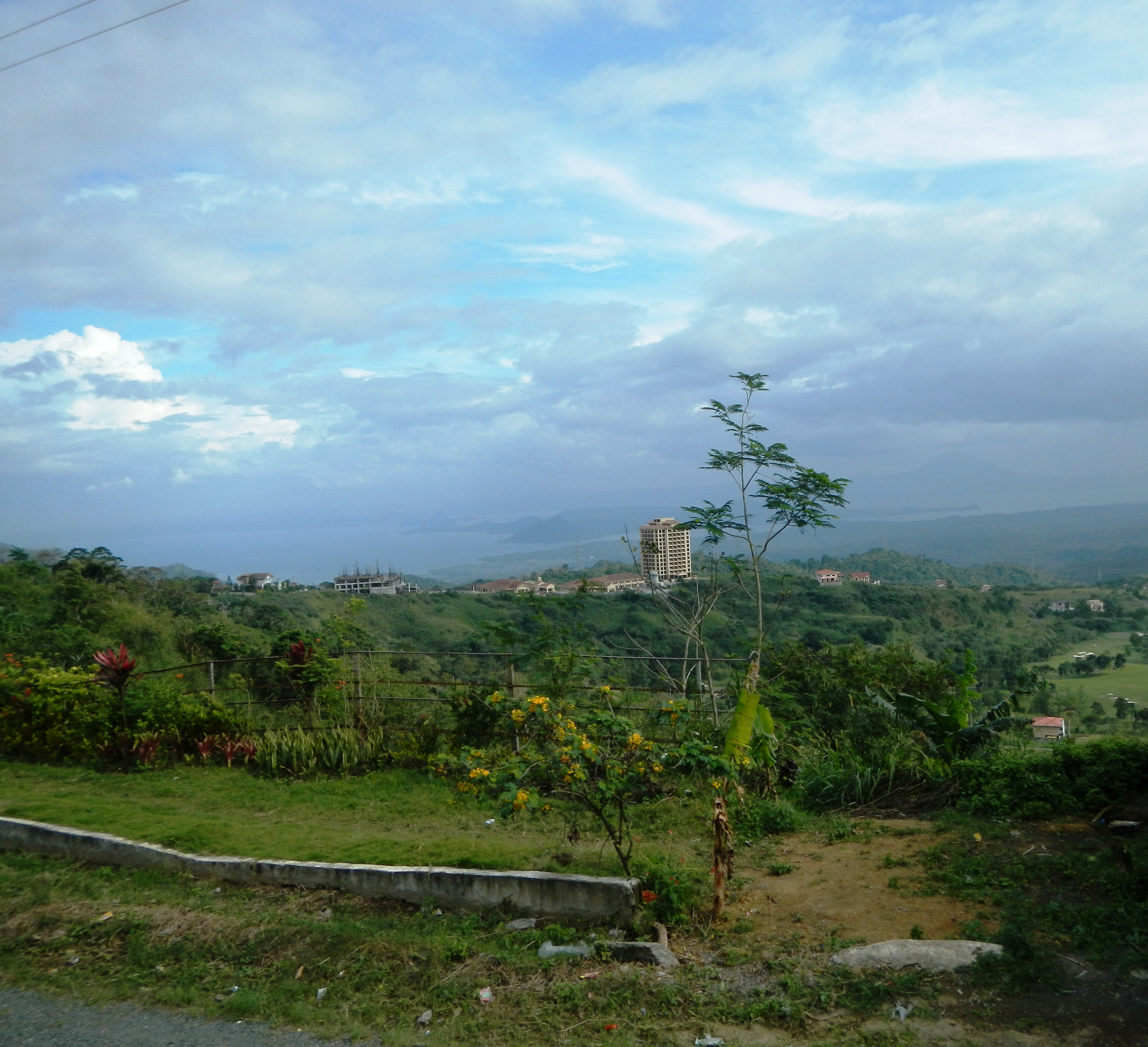
View of Taal Lake in the far distance and Canyon Woods from the eastern side of Mount Batulao in Caylaway

Mount Batulao and its environs have been a playground for Metro Manila residents since at least the 1970s. In 1975, the area of Mount Batulao in Nasugbu as well as parts of the adjacent municipalities of Maragondon and Ternate were declared as tourist zones. One of its earliest developments was the sprawling Batulao Village Club developed by the family of senator Gil Puyat and designed by architect Benjamin Bautista with landscape design by Ildefonso P. Santos Jr. It was the destination of choice for affluent Manilans in the area of Tagaytay with its Gary Player-designed golf course, clubhouse, halfway house, village inn, cottages and sports complex with jai alai courts.

In 1998, the leisure and resort development called Evercrest Golf Club & Resort (now KC Hillcrest Hotel & Golf Club) was built on 78.8 hectares (195 acres) of property within the 1,300-hectare (3,200-acre) Nasugbu Highlands of the Puyat-owned Group Developers Inc. It featured a 76-room hotel, golf course and a condominium, and was developed by Gulod Resort company owned by businessman Jose Go of the Ever Gotesco mall chain. The company was also the developer behind the adjacent property of Chateau Royale Sports & Country Club (now Chateau Royale Hotel Resort & Spa), a 170-hectare (420-acre) resort complex that is home to the Tree Top Adventure park and Metropolitan Medical Center Nasugbu. Other developments within the Nasugbu Highlands include Batulao Monte Grande (now Sandari Batulao), an 800-hectare (2,000-acre) mountain township launched by Citystate Properties of ambassador Antonio Cabangon-Chua in 2007, and Batulao Artscapes, a 142-hectare (350-acre) masterplanned community and livable art park being developed by Century Properties.

== Retreat centers ==
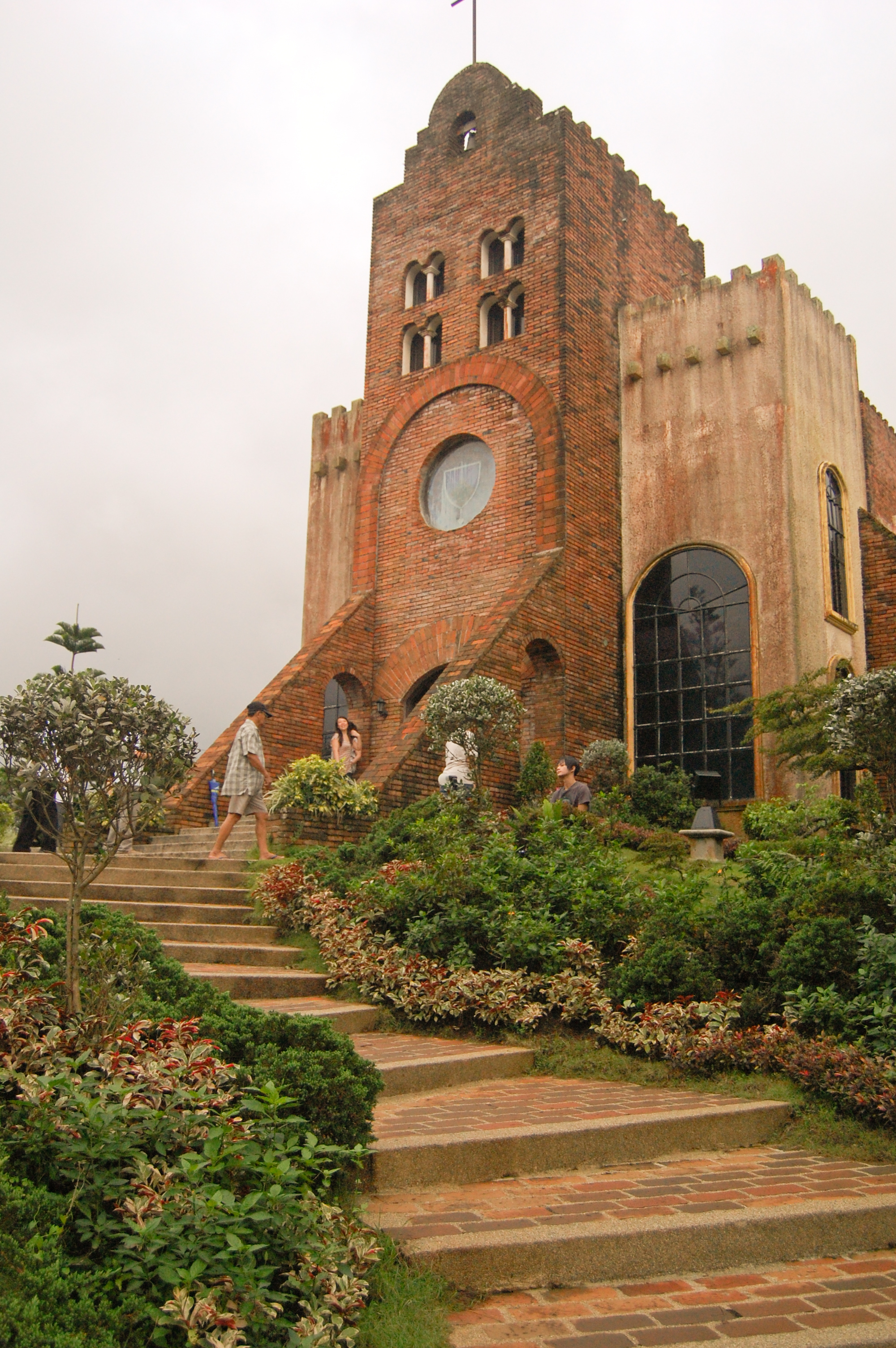
Transfiguration Chapel at Caleruega

Mount Batulao is home to Caleruega, a major retreat center and popular wedding location that sits on 8 hectares (20 acres) of hilly landscape adjacent to the former Evercrest Golf Club. It was established by the Dominican Order in 1994 as the venue for seminars and retreats of the Dominican institutions in the Philippines. The religious complex was named after the birthplace in Spain of the Dominican patron, Saint Dominic. Its famous landmark is a chapel perched on a hill, the Chapel of the Transfiguration of Jesus, that has become a favorite out-of-town wedding venue that sits only 150 people. The iconic chapel is surrounded by pine trees reminiscent of the Spanish town and has a statue of Risen Christ designed by Ben Hur Villanueva in its front lawn. The entire complex consists of 39 Catholic houses used as retreat houses, formation houses, seminaries and prayer houses.

The Salesians of Don Bosco in the Philippines also run a retreat center on Mount Batulao. Founded in 1984, the Don Bosco Center for Spirituality is dedicated to their patron, Mary Help of Christians, and is also known as the Mary Help of Christians House of Spirituality. It has its own Chapel on the Hill, which also caters to weddings, located beside the entrance to its retreat house.
