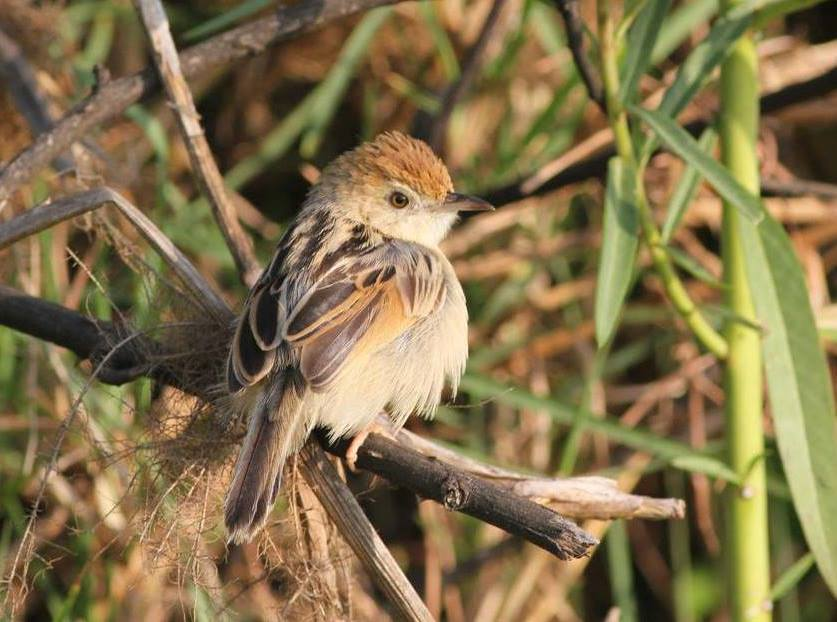
- C. g. isodactylus in Mozambique

Conservation status
- Least Concern (IUCN 3.1)

Scientific classification
- Kingdom: Animalia
- Phylum: Chordata
- Class: Aves
- Order: Passeriformes
- Family: Cisticolidae
- Genus: Cisticola
- Species: C. galactotes

Binomial name
- Cisticola galactotes (Temminck, 1821)

= Rufous-winged cisticola =

Species of bird

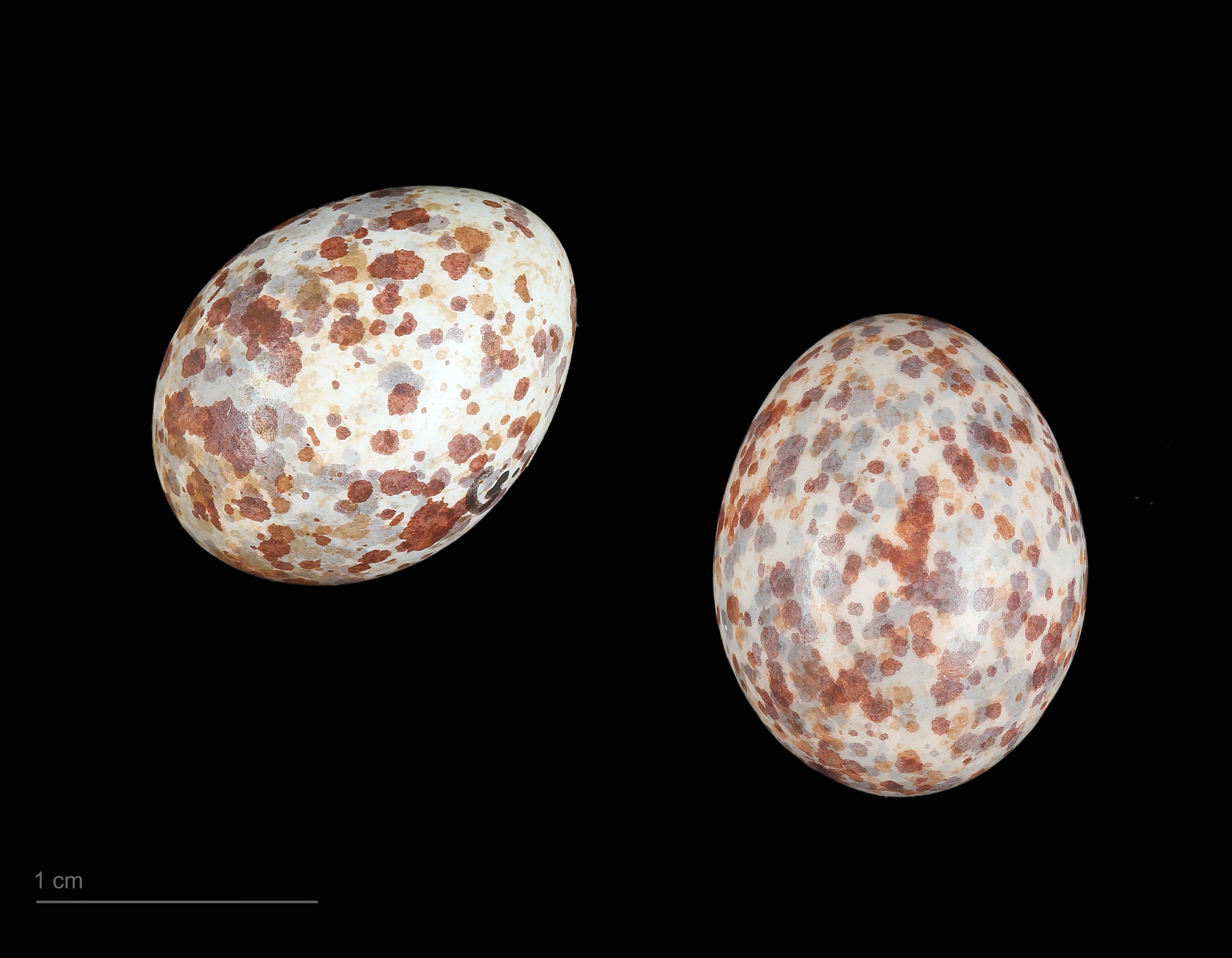
Cisticola galactotes

The rufous-winged cisticola (Cisticola galactotes) is a species of bird in the family Cisticolidae. It is found on the east coast of southern Africa.

== Taxonomy ==
The rufous-winged cisticola has two subspecies:

- C. g. isodactylus Peters, W, 1868 from southern Malawi, south-eastern Zimbabwe and western Mozambique; and
- C. g. galactotes (Temminck, 1821) from southern Mozambique and eastern South Africa.

This taxon was split from the winding cisticola by the IOC and HBW, as were the Luapula cisticola, coastal cisticola and Ethiopian cisticola. The Clements (2017) and Howard and Moore (2014) world lists consider these taxa as a single species, the winding cisticola C. galactotes (sensu lato).

== Distribution and habitat ==
It is found in Mozambique, Zimbabwe and South Africa.

Its natural habitats are subtropical or tropical seasonally wet or flooded lowland grassland and swamps.
