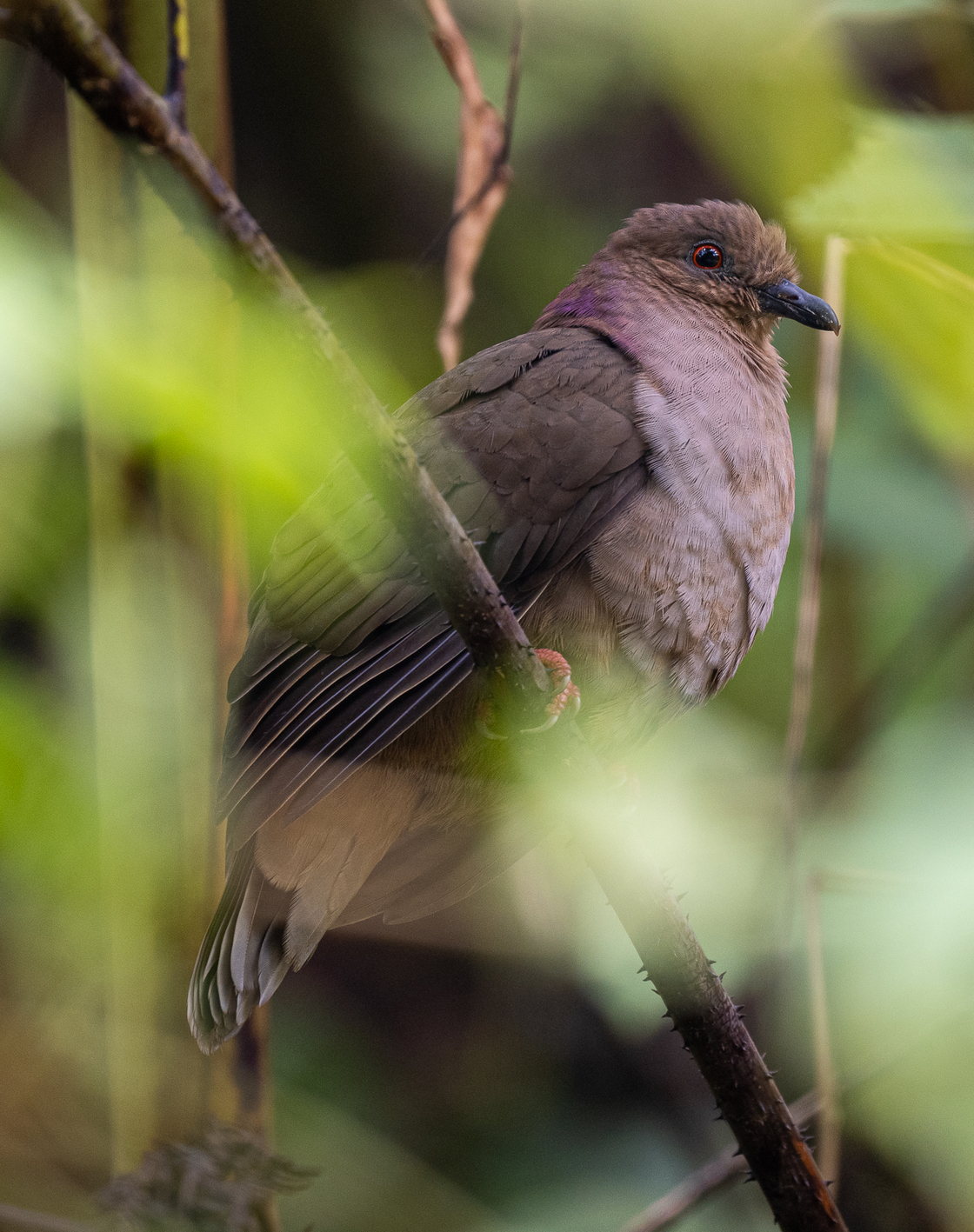

Conservation status
- Vulnerable (IUCN 3.1)

Scientific classification
- Kingdom: Animalia
- Phylum: Chordata
- Class: Aves
- Order: Columbiformes
- Family: Columbidae
- Genus: Phapitreron
- Species: P. brunneiceps

Binomial name
- Phapitreron brunneiceps (Bourns & Worcester, 1894)

= Mindanao brown dove =

Species of bird

The Mindanao brown dove (Phapitreron brunneiceps) is a threatened species of bird in the family Columbidae. It is endemic to forests on the Philippine islands of Mindanao and Basilan, but it has not been recorded from the latter island since 1937. On Mindanao, it is typically found in tropical moist montane forest. It is threatened by habitat loss and hunting. Until recently, it was considered conspecific with the Tawitawi brown dove and collectively called the dark-eared brown dove.

== Description and taxonomy ==
Adults look similar to amethyst brown dove and white-eared brown dove but are distinguishable by a brown crown, vinous-gray belly, buff undertail-coverts and less olive back. Generally brown-colored, these medium-sized birds have a glossy reddish-violet patch on sides of the neck and warm, dark brown upper parts. Additional distinguishing features include a slightly darker nape compared to the crown, a narrow dark streak under the eye, black bill, dark pink feet with brown nails and iris that is orange-red in color.

Based on size, the amethyst brown dove is the largest of the three, followed by the Mindanao brown dove and the white-eared brown dove the smallest. It is very distinct from the Tawitawi brown dove as it is much darker and lacks the peach of the Tawitawi brown dove.

Its call is an accelerating series of identically pitched notes, "wup-pup-pup-pu-pu-pu-pu", reminiscent of a ping-pong ball falling on a table.

== Ecology and behavior ==
Almost nothing is known about this species but it is pressumed to be a frugivore feeding on seeds and fruits. In the early 20th century, its nest was described to be a typical dove nest of loosely arranged sticks. The nest was said to contain 2 chicks. Otherwise, there is no data on the breeding habits of this rare species.

== Conservation status ==
It occurs in tropical moist lowland forest and tropical moist low-montane forest typically at a range of 900 to 2,000 meters above sea level but there are sparse records way below at 150 m. It occurs in humid interiors and dense secondary forest. It is not clear if the species makes seasonal or altitudinal movements, but both are considered likely on a local scale.

IUCN assessed this species as vulnerable and estimates the population to be 2,500 to 9,999 mature individuals. Consideredl rare in its range threats include habitat loss and hunting for both food and the exotic pet trade. Illegal logging is not as rampant at high elevations, because most trees are not commercially valuable and the slopes are too steep to be converted to farmland. However, mining, both legal and illegal, are prevalent.

It occurs in a few protected areas including Mount Kitanglad National Park, Mount Apo Natural Park, Mount Malindang National Park and Moun Hilong-hilong. Mount Matutum has been proposed as a national park. However as is the case in most of the country, deforestation and hunting still occur in these areas as protection is lax.

Conservation actions proposed include to survey to assess abundance, elevational range and habitat requirements at key sites and to assess whether the species is present in poorly surveyed areas of Mindanao Ensure the effective protection of remaining forest at key and potential sites.
