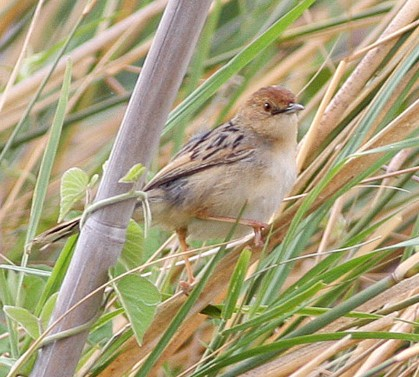

Conservation status
- Least Concern (IUCN 3.1)

Scientific classification
- Kingdom: Animalia
- Phylum: Chordata
- Class: Aves
- Order: Passeriformes
- Family: Cisticolidae
- Genus: Cisticola
- Species: C. luapula

Binomial name
- Cisticola luapula Lynes, 1933

= Luapula cisticola =

Species of bird

The Luapula cisticola (Cisticola luapula) is a species of bird in the family Cisticolidae.

== Taxonomy ==
The Luapula cisticola is monotypic. This taxon was split from the winding cisticola by the IOC and HBW, as were the rufous-winged cisticola, coastal cisticola and Ethiopian cisticola. The Clements (2017) and Howard and Moore (2014) world lists consider these taxa as a single species, the winding cisticola C. galactotes (sensu lato).

== Distribution and habitat ==
This species is found in eastern Angola, Lake Mweru (south-eastern DRC), Zambia, northern and north-eastern Namibia, northern Botswana and north-western Zimbabwe.

Its natural habitats are tropical seasonally wet or flooded lowland grassland and swamps.
