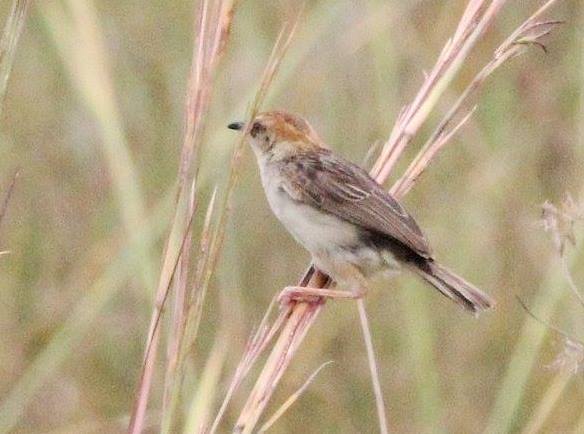
- Cisticola marginatus amphilectus in Angola

Conservation status
- Least Concern (IUCN 3.1)

Scientific classification
- Kingdom: Animalia
- Phylum: Chordata
- Class: Aves
- Order: Passeriformes
- Family: Cisticolidae
- Genus: Cisticola
- Species: C. marginatus

Binomial name
- Cisticola marginatus (Heuglin, 1869)

= Winding cisticola =

Species of bird

The winding cisticola (Cisticola marginatus) is a species of bird in the family Cisticolidae. It has a scattered distribution across Africa south of the Sahara, and north of 11°S.

== Taxonomy ==
The winding cisticola has several subspecies:

- C. m. amphilectus Reichenow, 1875 Mauritania and Senegal to Ghana, south-western Cameroon and north-western Angola
- C. m. zalingei Lynes, 1930 northern Nigeria to western Sudan
- C. m. marginatus (Heuglin, 1869) southern Sudan and northern Uganda
- C. m. nyansae Neumann, 1905 central DRCongo to Uganda and Kenya
- C. m. suahelicus Neumann, 1905 south-eastern DRCongo, Tanzania and north-eastern Zambia

The Clements list (2017) and the Howard and Moore list (2014) lump the rufous-winged cisticola, Luapula cisticola, coastal cisticola and Ethiopian cisticola with the above subspecies as the winding cisticola Cisticola galactotes (sensu lato). The Clements list (2017) recognizes 11 subspecies.

== Habitat ==
Its natural habitats are tropical seasonally wet or flooded lowland grassland and swamps.

== Gallery ==
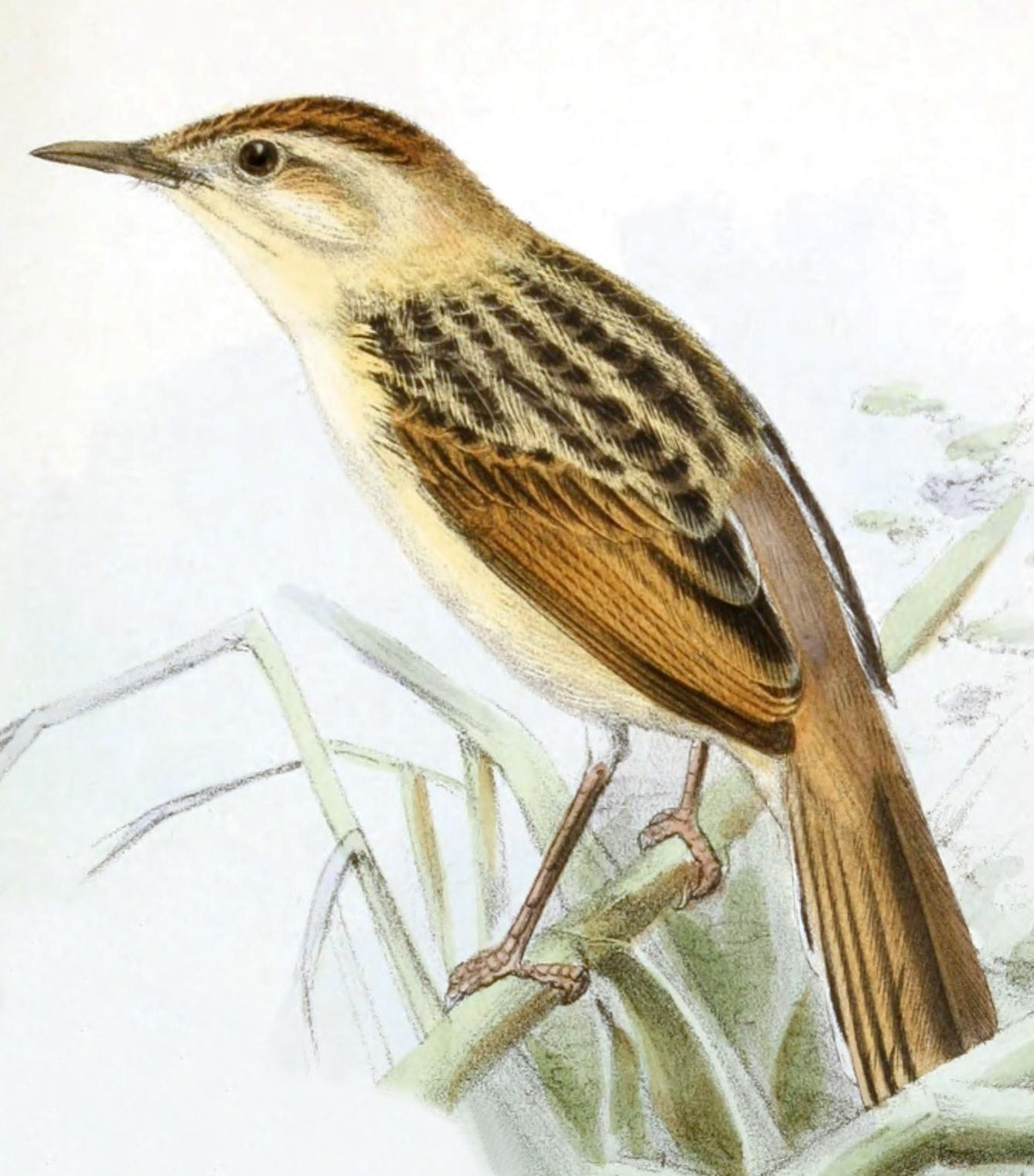
Cisticola marginatus illustrated by Keulemans

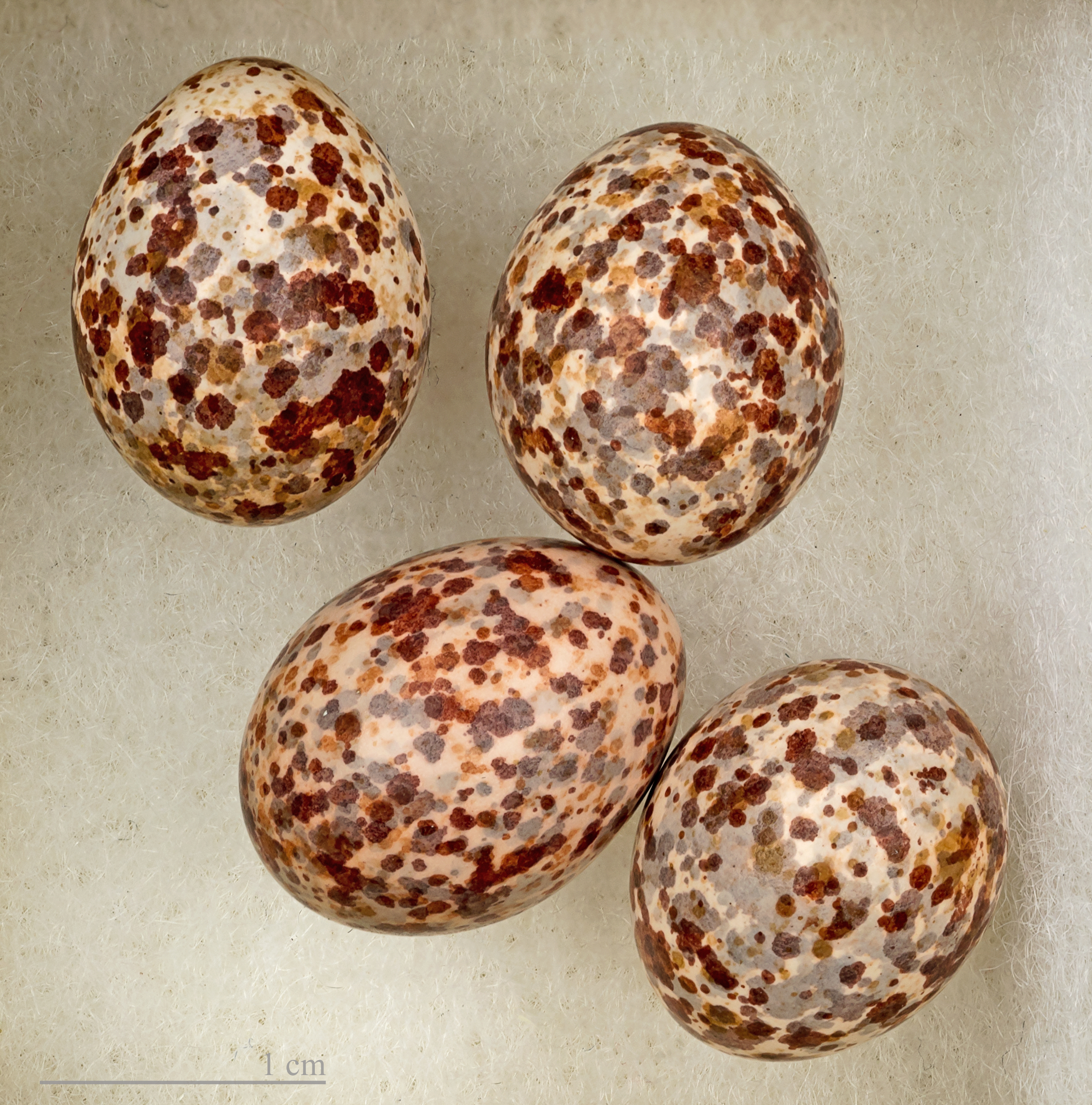
Eggs of Cisticola marginatus amphilectus

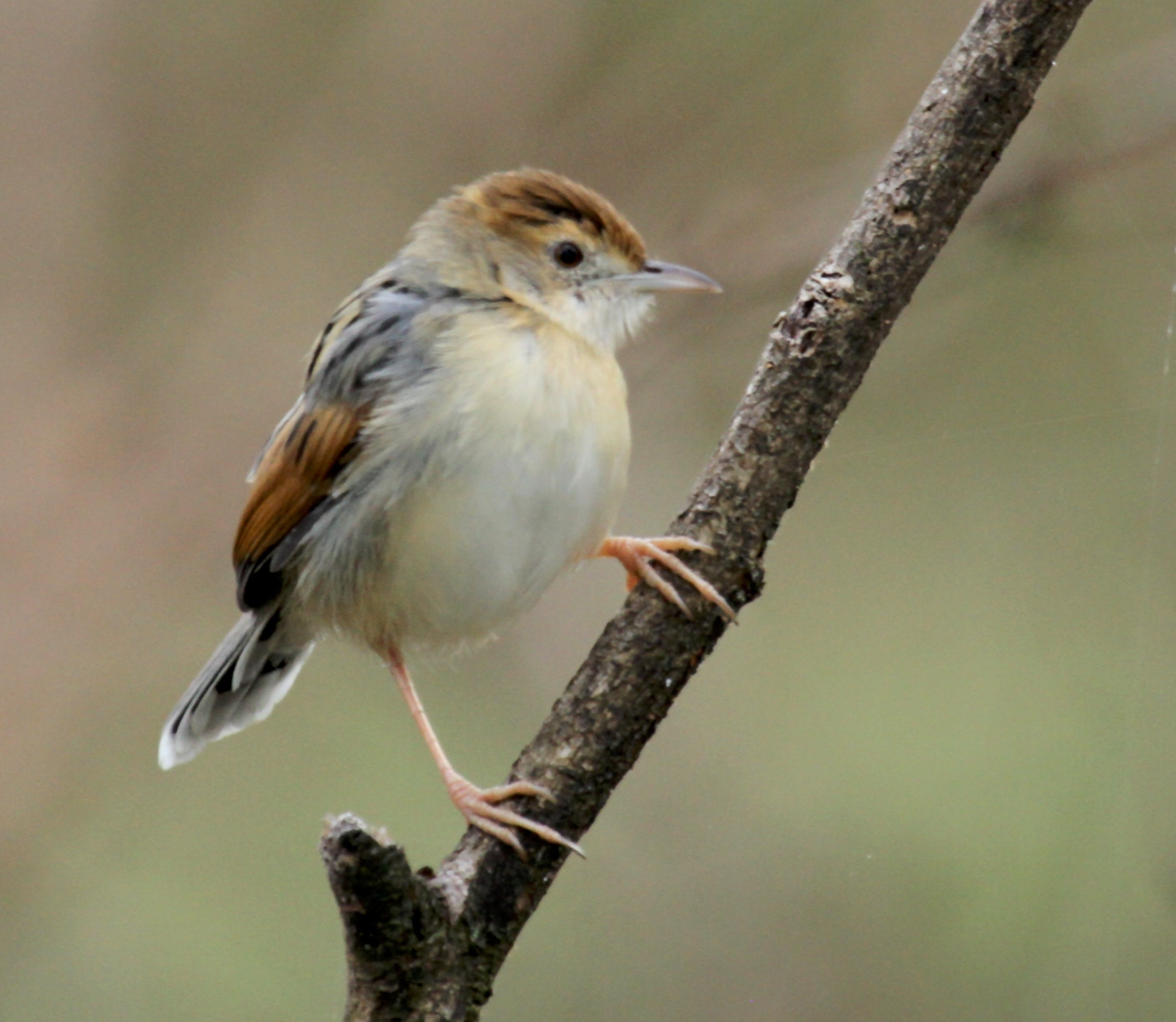
Lake Navasha Country Club - Kenya
