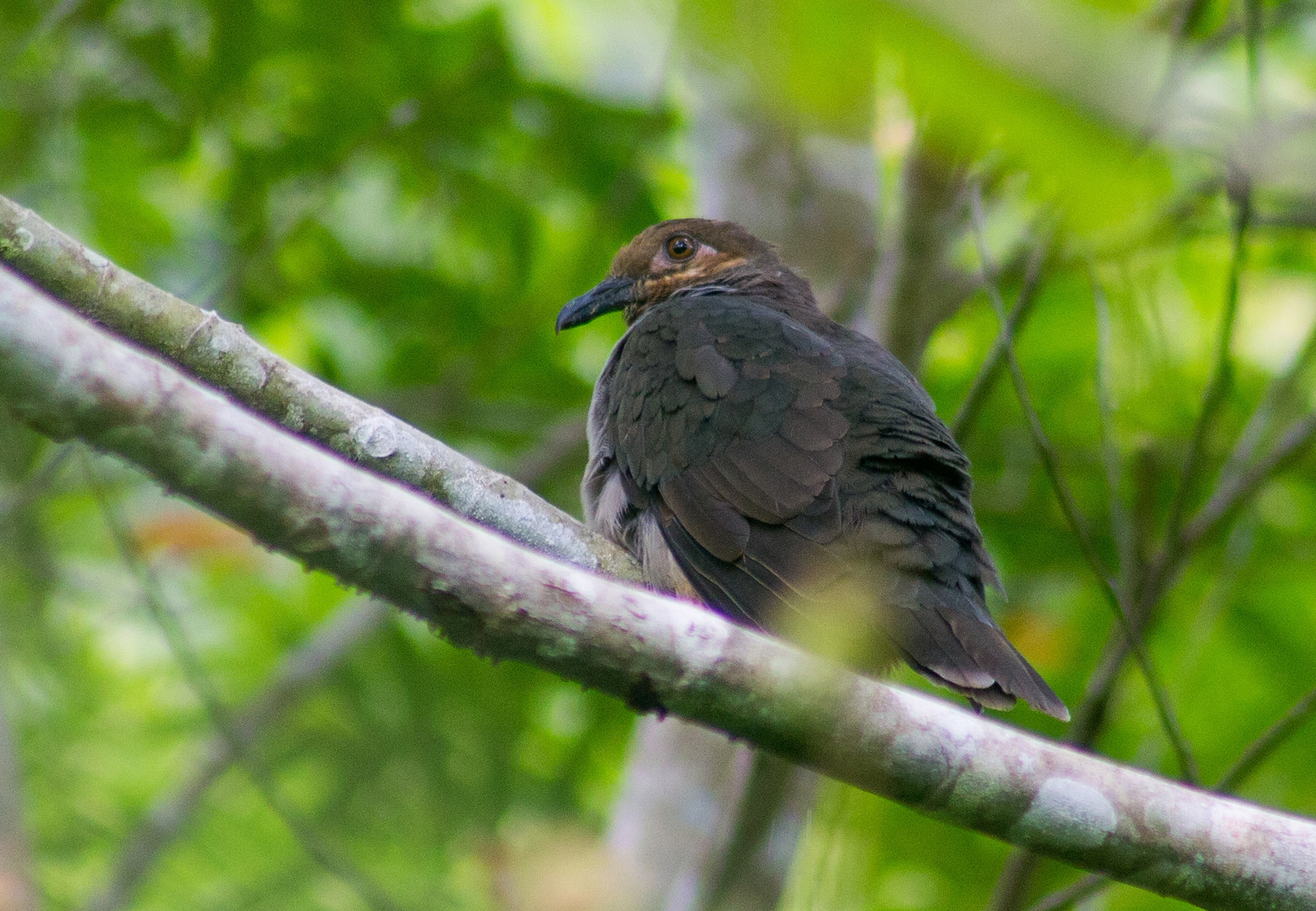

Conservation status
- Near Threatened (IUCN 3.1)

Scientific classification
- Kingdom: Animalia
- Phylum: Chordata
- Class: Aves
- Order: Columbiformes
- Family: Columbidae
- Genus: Phapitreron
- Species: P. amethystinus
- Subspecies: P. a. maculipectus

Trinomial name
- Phapitreron amethystinus maculipectus Bourns & Worcester, 1894

= Grey-breasted brown dove =

Gray-breasted brown dove

Species of bird

The grey-breasted brown dove (Phapitreron amethystinus maculipectus) is a subspecies of amethyst brown dove in the family Columbidae. It is endemic to the Philippines being found in Negros and Panay. Its natural habitats are or tropical moist lowland forests and tropical moist montane forests. It is found in lowlands but probably prefers middle and high elevations at 500-2000m. It is most often seen singly or in pairs, in and around fruiting trees. The call is a deep, sonorous "hoot-hoot-hoot-hoot", and birds may sit and call for long periods.

== Description ==
It is differentiated from the amethyst brown dove in Luzon (amethystinus subspecies) and Mindanao (imeldae subspecies) with is light grey breast and overall lighter appearance. It also has a longer bill and pink legs. The HBW and BirdLife International Illustrated Checklist of the Birds of the World considers it as a separate species Phapitreron maculipectus.

== Conservation status ==
The dove is considered rare in its range. Negros is one of the most deforested islands in the country and is only found in the remnant forests. Range in Panay has not been fully surveyed but they may persist in larger numbers. As of 2023, the IUCN estimates the population to be 5,500 to 10,000 mature individuals. Threats include habitat loss and hunting for both food and the exotic pet trade.
