= Mount Marami =

Cliff in Luzon, Philippines

- Mataas na Gulod
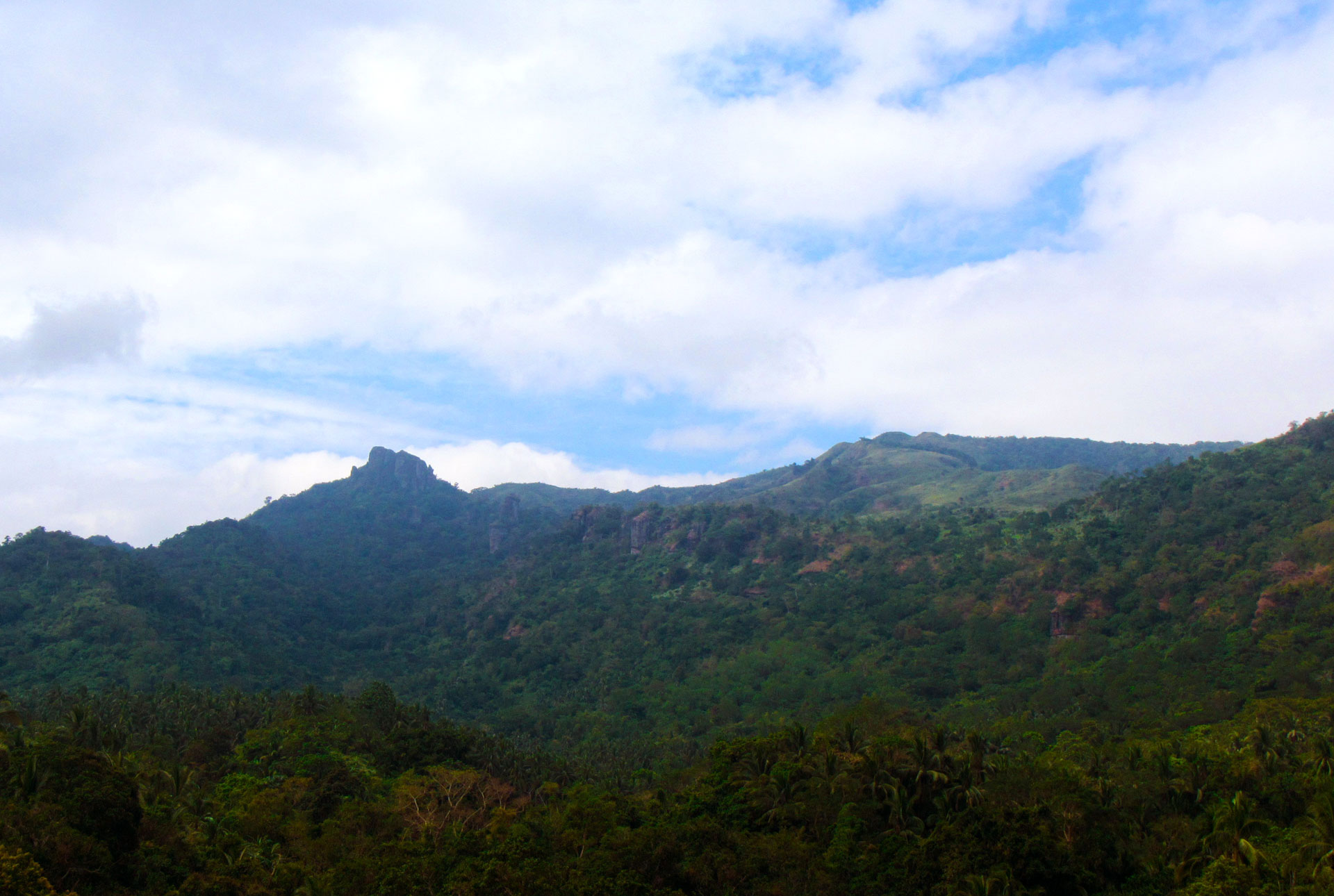
- Mt. Marami and Mataas na Gulod

Highest point
- Elevation: 633 m (2,077 ft)
- Coordinates: 14°11′55″N 120°41′10″E

Geography
- Location within Luzon Location within Philippines
- Country: Philippines
- Region: Calabarzon
- Province: Batangas; Cavite
- City/municipality: Magallanes; Maragondon; Nasugbu

Geology
- Mountain type: Stratovolcano
- Volcanic arc: Bataan Arc
- Last eruption: Unknown

Mount Marami, or Mataas na Gulod Boulders, is a cliff at the southern portion of Mount Mataas na Gulod in Cavite province on the island of Luzon, Philippines. The mountain rises to an elevation of 633 m (2,077 ft) above mean sea level and is one of the ancient volcanic features of Bataan Arc.

== History ==
The rock pillars feature was once called as Nagbuo by the locals. And as soon as mountaineers frequented the area, it was called Marami (en. plenty) as referencing to its feature having multiple rocky pillars.

== Hiking activity ==
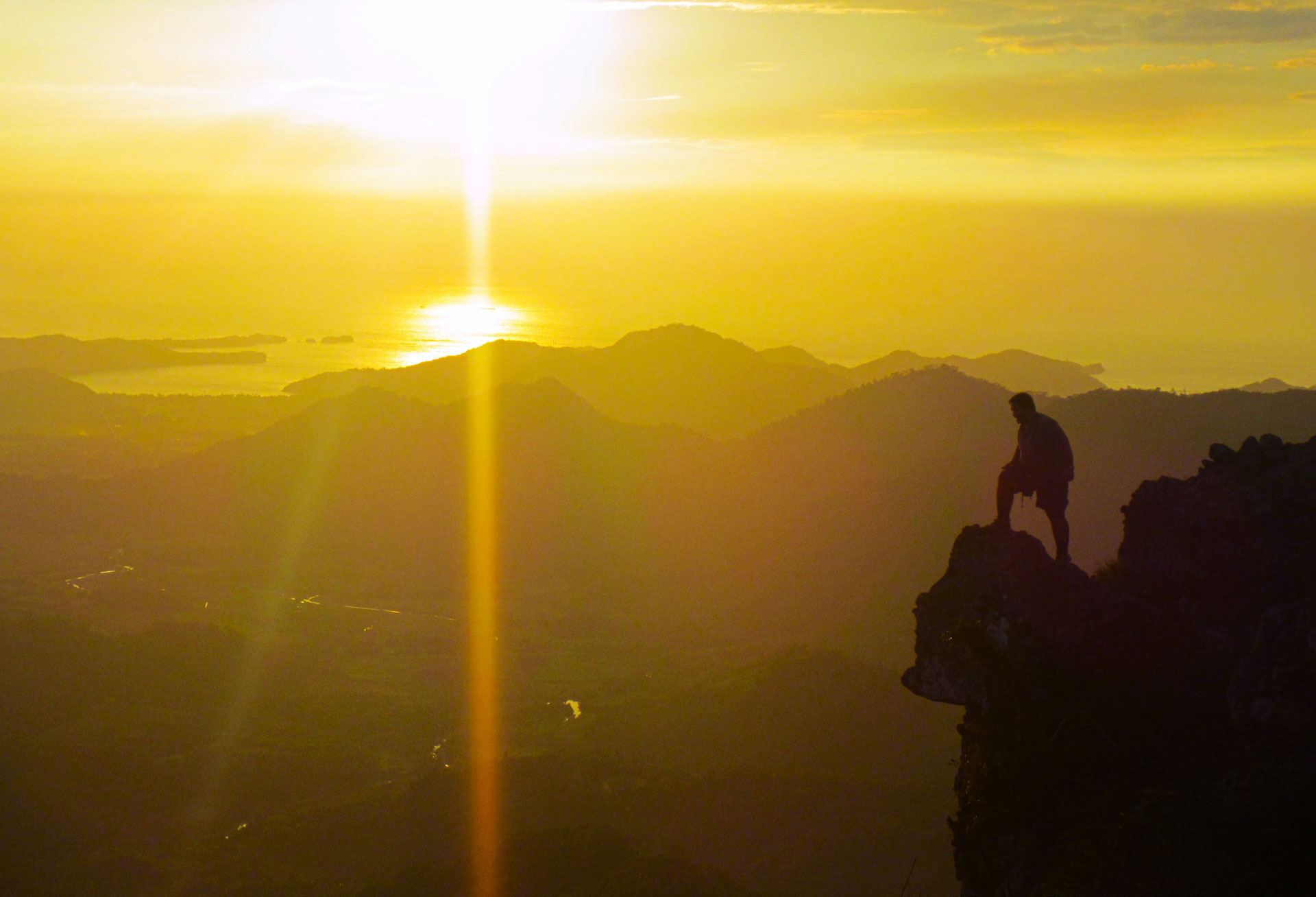
The Silyang Bato is an adjacent rock pillar feature from Mt. Marami's Summit of Maragondon, Cavite in the Philippines

Mount Marami can be climbed from Barangay Ramirez of Magallanes, Cavite to where the trail ends at its summit where the Silyang Bato, a rock formation which means Stone Chair, can be climbed for a 360-degree view of the Mounts Palay-Palay–Mataas-na-Gulod Protected Landscape.

A trail traversing all the mountains of the protected landscape starting at the foot of Marami and ends at Palay-Palay in Nasugbu was mapped by a five-man expedition team in 2014.

== See also ==
- List of mountains in the Philippines
- List of national parks of the Philippines
