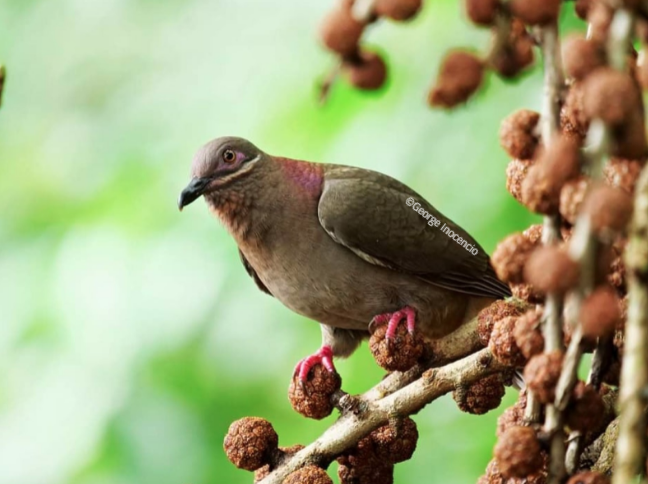

Conservation status
- Least Concern (IUCN 3.1)

Scientific classification
- Kingdom: Animalia
- Phylum: Chordata
- Class: Aves
- Order: Columbiformes
- Family: Columbidae
- Genus: Phapitreron
- Species: P. amethystinus

Binomial name
- Phapitreron amethystinus Bonaparte, 1855

= Amethyst brown dove =

Species of bird

The amethyst brown dove (Phapitreron amethystinus) is a species of bird in the family Columbidae.

It is endemic to the Philippines, it is found on Luzon, Polillo Islands, Catanduanes, Samar, Bohol and Mindanao. It is generally rather scarce in much of its range. Its natural habitats are tropical moist lowland forests and tropical moist montane forests. It is found in lowlands but probably prefers middle and high elevations at 500-2000m. It is most often seen singly or in pairs, in and around fruiting trees. The call is a deep, sonorous "hoop" as well as a rather rapid "poo-poo-poo-poop", and birds may sit and call for long periods.

== Description and taxonomy ==
According to Constantino (2011), the amethyst brown dove is strikingly alike with white-eared brown dove due to the presence of subocular white lines just below the eye. However, it can be distinguished from the rest as they are rare deep-woods birds with colors that are generally darker brown than P. leucotis, with bills that are noticeably longer and heavier than its tarsus and an extensive bluer purple patch on its mantle. Some of its physical features include a grey tinge and purplish brown underparts, rich tan undertail-coverts, dark and white sub-ocular eye-lines, reddish-brown chin and throat with darker streaking, shading on breast to medium to darkish dull brown with narrowly edged dark back and scapulars. They also have pink flesh around the eye with amethyst or purple iridescence on the nape.

=== Subspecies ===
Four subspecies are recognized:

- P. a. amethystinus - Found on Luzon, Samar, Dinagat, Mindanao, Bohol, Polillo Island and Catanduanes; Less metallic appearance and larger
- P. a. imeldae -: Found on Marinduque; More metallic appearance in back and smaller
- P. a. maculipectus - Found on Panay and Negros; Distinct grey breast and overall lighter appearance
- P. a. frontalis - Found on Cebu; Darker overall appearance and white lacks the stripe under eye. Probably extinct. Not seen since 1892.

Under the HBW and BirdLife International Illustrated Checklist of the Birds of the World, this has been split into three species. With the nominate and imeldae subspecies being retained as the Amethyst brown-dove while the maculipectus being named the Grey-breasted Brown-Dove and the possibly extinct frontalis classified as the Cebu brown dove.

== Behaviour and ecology ==
Diet consists of seeds and fruits. Usually seen alone or in pairs but also may congregate in fruiting trees. Breeding season believed to be from February to July. Nest is undescribed but believed to be the a typical lazilly build dove nest of a few twigs on a branch.

== Habitat and conservation status ==
It occurs in tropical moist lowland forest and tropical moist montane Forest to 2,500 meters above sea level (2,000 m on Negros and Panay and unknown in Cebu). It occurs in humid interiors and dense secondary forest

This species occurs on varying rarity throughout its range however. As the IUCN Red List follows the HBW and BirdLife International Illustrated Checklist of the Birds of the World, it has assessed each split species.

=== Amethyst brown dove P. a. amethystinus and imeldae) ===
The global population size has not been quantified, but the species is described as generally rather uncommon, although very common in the Sierra Madre in northern Luzon. It is classified as a Least-concern species with the population thought to be stable.

=== Grey-breasted brown dove (P. a. maculipectus) ===
Considered extremely rare in range. Negros is one of the most deforested islands in the country and is only found in the remnant forests. Range in Panay has not been fully surveyed but they may persist in larger numbers. IUCN estimates the population to be 2,500 to 9,999 mature individuals with the population continuing to decline. Threats including habitat loss and hunting for both food and the exotic pet trade.

=== Cebu brown dove (P. a. frontalis) ===
The species had not been observed with certainty since 1892, however it has since been reported on several occasions between 2007 and 2012, although these sightings have not been verified. If it still persists, it is threatened by habitat loss and poaching. Cebu has <0.03% of its original forest cover and is the most deforested large island in the Philippines. It is classified as Critically Endangered (Possibly extinct). Any remaining population must be tiny, and the population is therefore placed in the band 1-49 mature individuals. It is #46 on the EDGE species of birds.

== Works cited ==
- Baptista, L.F., Trail, P.W., Horblit, H.M., Kirwan, G.M. and E.F.J. Garcia. 2017. Amethyst Brown-dove (Phapitreron amethystinus). In: del Hoyo, J., Elliott, A., Sargatal, J., Christie, D.A. & de Juana, E. (eds.). Handbook of the Birds of the World Alive. Lynx Edicions, Barcelona, retrieved from: https://www.hbw.com/node/54284
- Constantino, A. 2011. A calling amethyst brown-dove [HD]. Retrieved from Birding Adventure Philippines: http://www.birdingphilippines.com/2011/10/13/a-calling-amethyst-brown-dove-hd/
- McGregor, R. C. 1909. A manual of Philippine birds (Vol. 2). Ripol Classic Publishing House.
