= Mounts Palay-Palay–Mataas-na-Gulod Protected Landscape =

- IUCN category V (protected landscape/seascape)
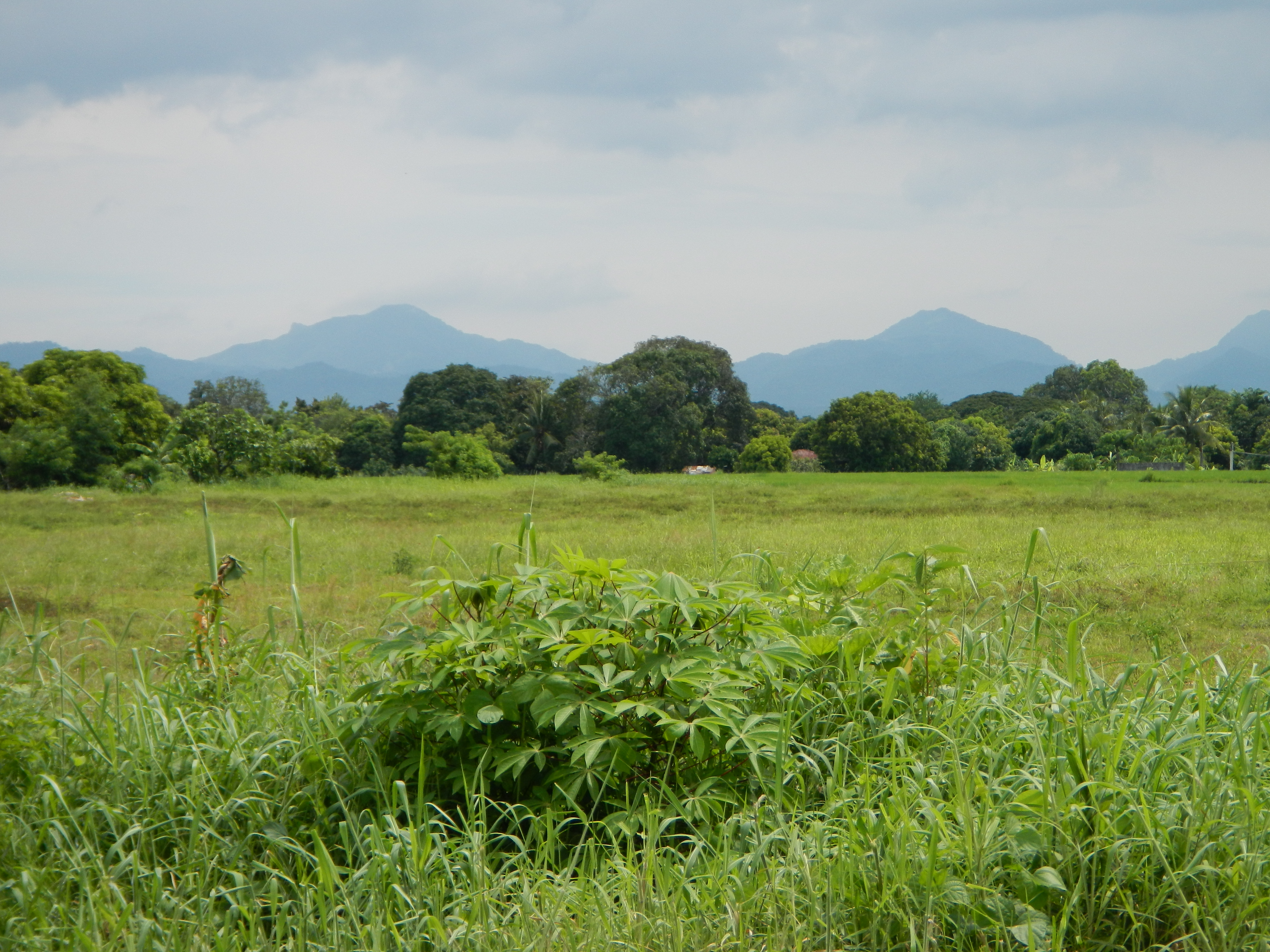
- View of the Palay-Palay Mountain Range in the far distance as seen from Naic

- Location within Philippines
- Location: Cavite and Batangas, Philippines
- Nearest town: Maragondon and Tagaytay
- Coordinates: 14°12′56″N 120°39′11″E
- Area: 3,973.13 hectares (9,817.8 acres)
- Established: October 26, 1976 (National park); June 27, 2007 (Protected landscape)
- Governing body: Department of Environment and Natural Resources

The Mounts Palay-Palay–Mataas-na-Gulod Protected Landscape is a 3,973.13-hectare (9,817.8-acre) protected area encompassing the Palay-Palay Mountain Range in southwestern Luzon island near Manila in the Philippines. It was established on October 26, 1976 as a national park and game refuge and bird sanctuary covering an initial area of 4,000 hectares (9,900 acres). In 2007, the national park was designated as a protected landscape area under the National Integrated Protected Areas System through Proclamation No. 1315 signed by President Gloria Arroyo. The park is the last remaining lowland rainforest in the province of Cavite and is well known for Mount Pico de Loro, a popular destination for mountaineers and hikers from Metro Manila.

== Description ==
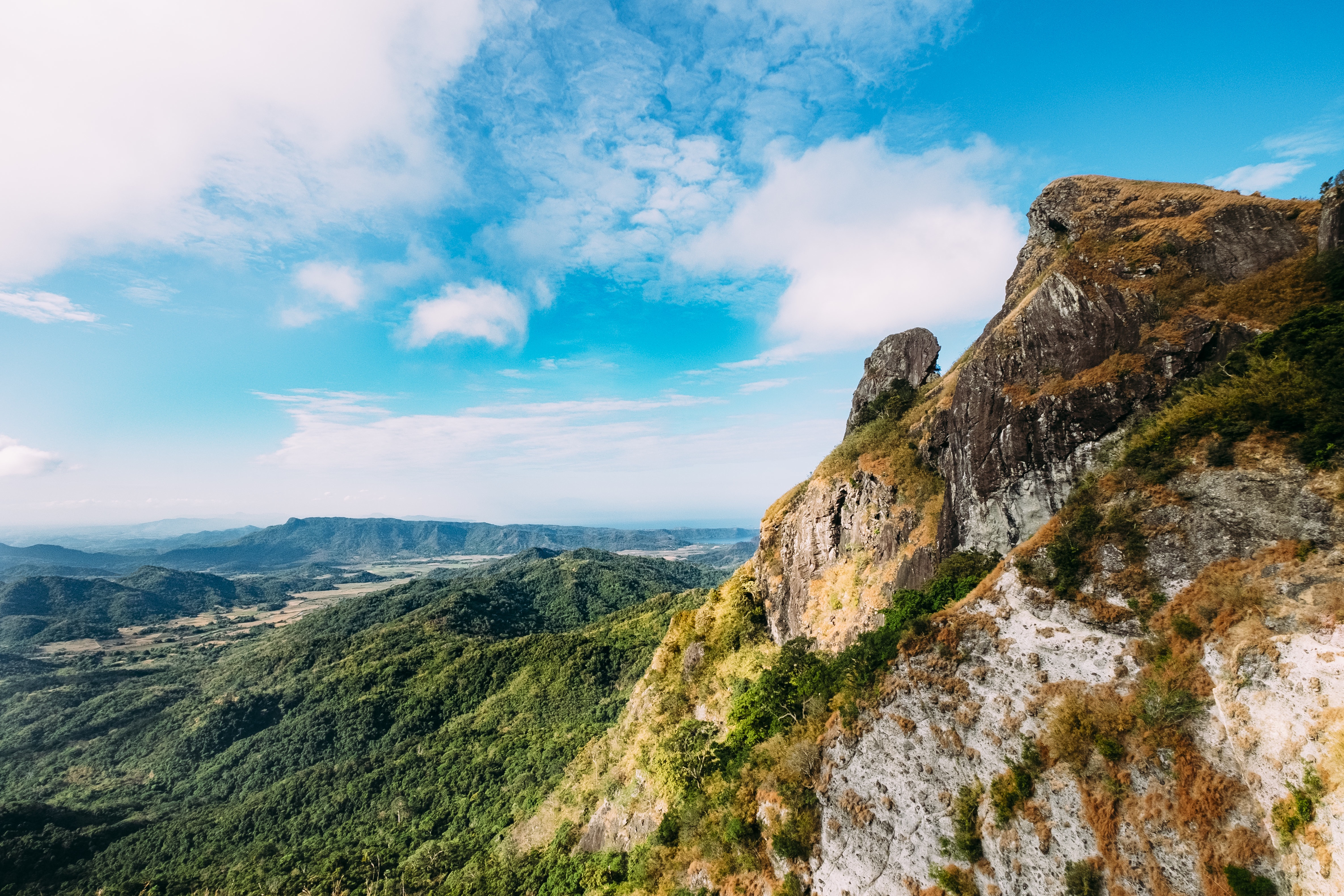
Summit of Mount Pico de Loro

The Palay-Palay protected landscape area is situated in the mountain range that forms the border between the densely populated provinces of Cavite and Batangas in the Calabarzon region. It contains parts of the municipalities of Maragondon and Ternate in Cavite and Nasugbu in Batangas and is spread over four barangays, namely Sapang, Pinagsanhan, Patungan and Papaya, and seven sitios, namely Malauyas, Caynipa, Caytako, Cacabay, Magabe, Murangdalig and Hamilo. It is bounded on the north by the coves and beaches of Ternate including Caylabne Bay and Puerto Azul, on the south by the rolling hills and farmlands of Nasugbu, on the west by Limbones Cove, and on the east by the rolling plateau of Maragondon.

The mountain range consists of two prominent extinct volcanoes, namely Mount Palay-Palay at 688 metres (2,257 ft) high and Mount Mataas-na-Gulod, 642 metres (2,106 ft) high. Mount Palay-Palay, located in the park's northern portion, covers sixty percent of the protected area. A major attraction in the park is Mount Pico de Loro at the southern portion which was named for the towering formation at its summit which resembles a parrot's beak. It is also the highest mountain in Cavite at 688 metres (2,257 ft) where hikers are rewarded with scenic views of Manila Bay and its islands, and South China Sea, as well as the coves and beaches of Nasugbu including Mounts Batulao and Carilao (Talamitam). Other notable peaks in the mountain range include Mount Marami, Mount Buntis and Mount Nagpatong where the Filipino revolutionary Andres Bonifacio was executed in 1897, and Mounts Kalanggaman and Dos Picos at the center of the protected landscape.

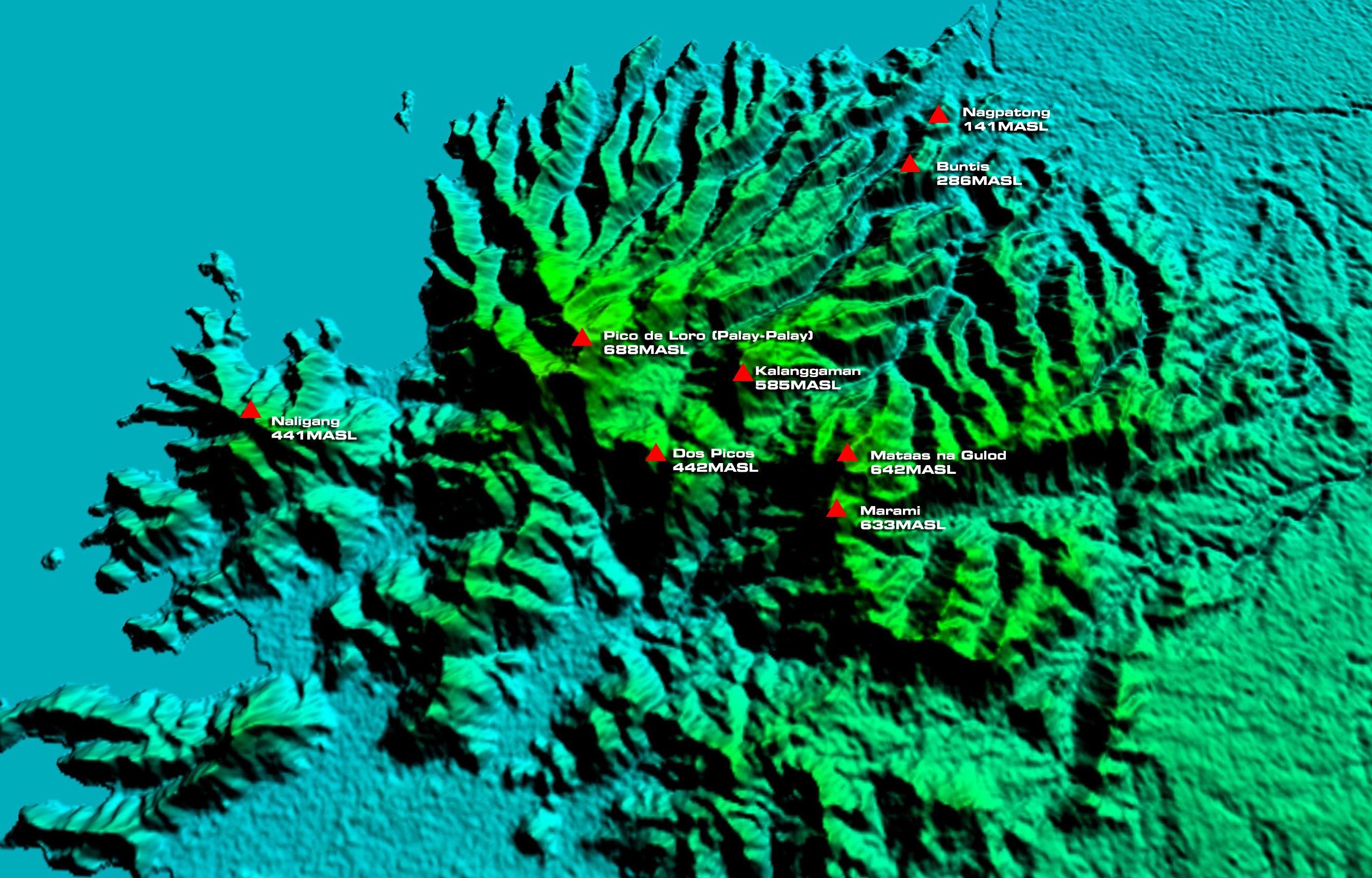
Mataas na Gulod - Palay Palay Protected Landscape Relief Map

== Bird sanctuary ==
The protected landscape is an important bird area having been initially proclaimed a game refuge and bird sanctuary. It is home to a diverse number of bird species such as the Philippine eagle-owl, Philippine falconet, Philippine hawk-cuckoo, Philippine drongo-cuckoo, Philippine hawk-owl, ashy thrush, brahminy kite, crested serpent eagle, Philippine fairy-bluebird, Philippine trogon, black-chinned fruit dove, island swiftlet, Philippine bulbul, Pacific swallow, Luzon hornbill and Philippine pygmy woodpecker.

== Accessibility ==
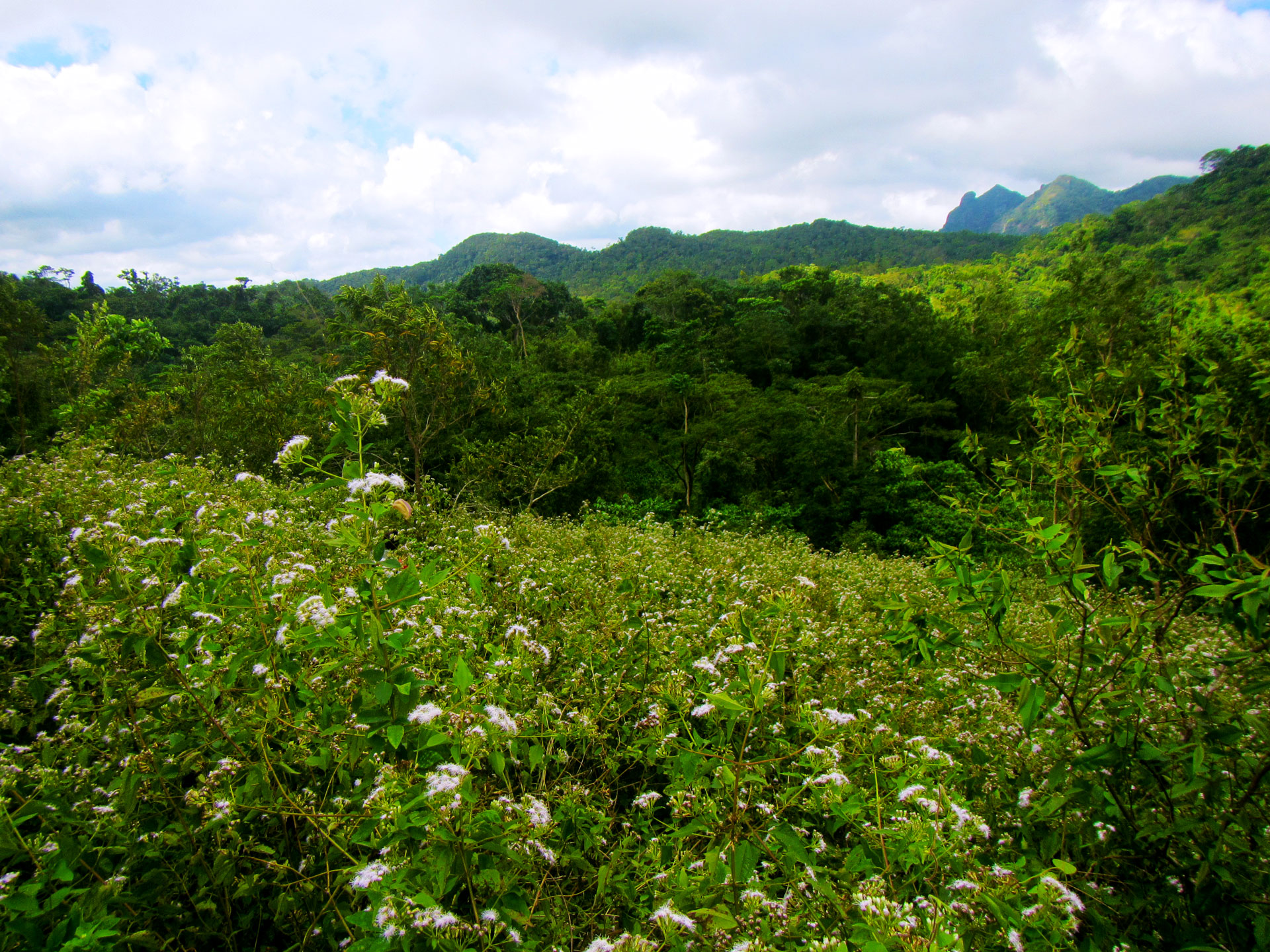
View of Mount Pico de Loro at a vantage point from the valley between Mount Mataas-na-Gulod and Mount Dos Picos at the middle of the Palay-Palay–Mataas-na-Gulod Protected Landscape

The park is located just 60 kilometres (37 mi) southwest of Manila and some 30 kilometres (19 mi) from the mountain resort city of Tagaytay. It is easily accessible via the new Ternate–Nasugbu mountain road completed in July 2013 which runs through the northwestern portion of the protected landscape from the western terminus of Governor's Drive in downtown Ternate to the seaside resorts of Nasugbu. It is also accessible by ferry boat from the Mall of Asia Pier in Bay City, Metro Manila. The Hamilo Ferry Terminal is at Hamilo Coast in Nasugbu, about 4 kilometres (2.5 mi) from Palay-Palay.

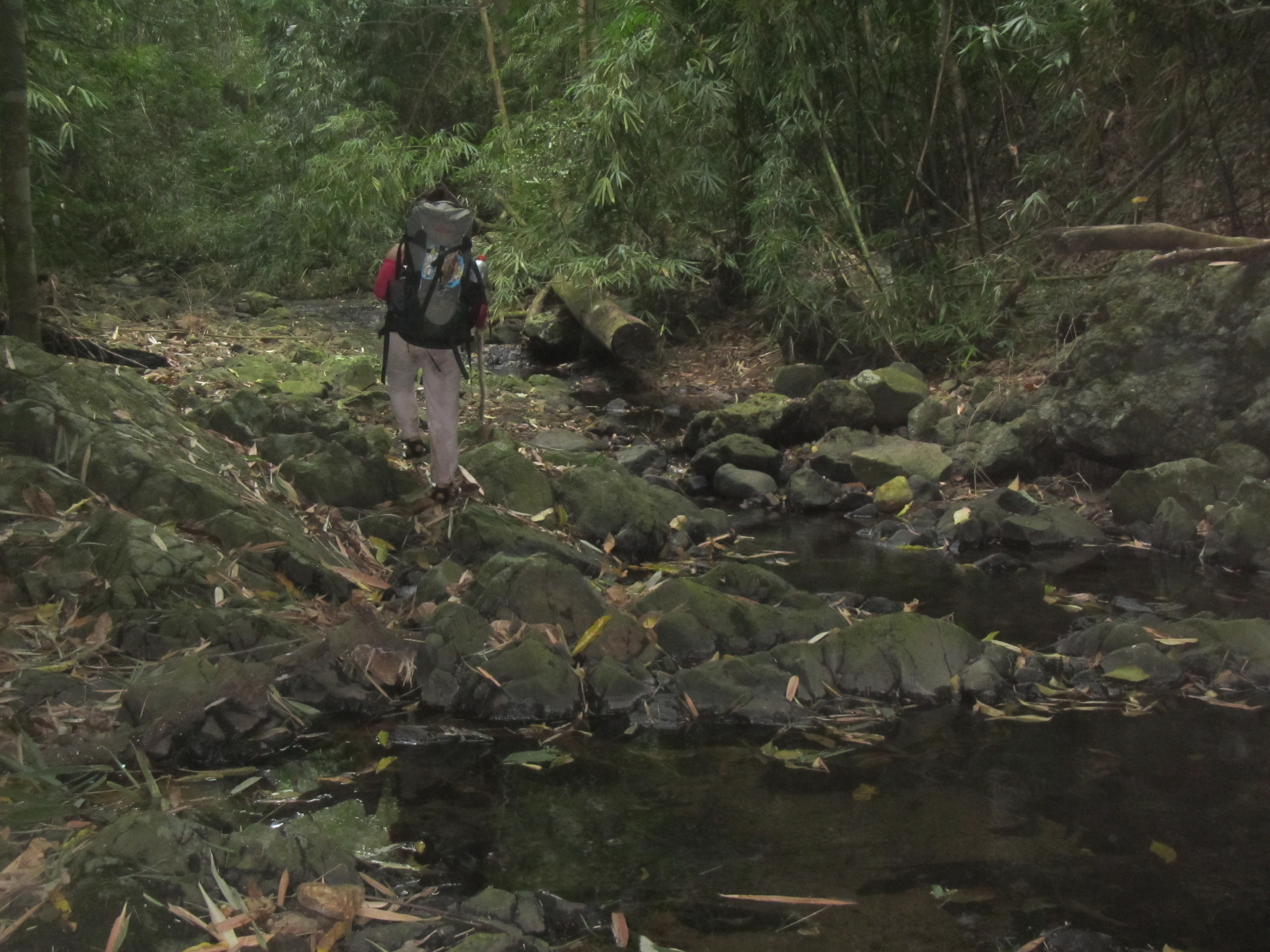
Anino River, a high-elevation, mid-jungle river at the center of the Mount Palay-Palay - Mataas na Gulod Protected Landscape

A 38.3 kilometres (23.8 mi) trail traversing the mountains of the protected landscape has been mapped and established by a five-man expedition team in 2014, to which the trail starts at Barangay Ramirez of Magallanes, Cavite passing through Mataas na Gulod, Dos Picos, Kalanggaman, and ends at Mount Palay-Palay towards the exit at Barangay Papaya in Nasugbu, Batangas. The trail passes through Anino River, a high-elevation river between the mountains of Dos Picos, Kalanggaman and Mataas na Gulod.

== See also ==
- Luzon rainforest
