= Dark-eared brown dove =

Dark-eared brown dove has been split into two species:

- Tawitawi brown dove, Phapitreron cinereiceps
- Mindanao brown dove, Phapitreron brunneiceps
