= Tawitawi brown dove =

Conservation status
- Endangered (IUCN 3.1)

Scientific classification
- Kingdom: Animalia
- Phylum: Chordata
- Class: Aves
- Order: Columbiformes
- Family: Columbidae
- Genus: Phapitreron
- Species: P. cinereiceps

Binomial name
- Phapitreron cinereiceps (Bourns & Worcester, 1894)

Species of bird

The Tawitawi brown dove (Phapitreron cinereiceps), also dark-eared brown dove, is a threatened species of bird in the family Columbidae noted for its orange-peach breast. It is endemic to forests in the Sulu Archipelago (islands of Tawi-Tawi and Sanga-Sanga) in the Philippines. Until recently it was considered conspecific with the Mindanao brown dove and collectively called the dark-eared brown dove. Although threatened by habitat loss, the rate of loss significantly reduced from 2004 to 2007, and it was thus downlisted from Critically Endangered to Endangered status in the 2007 IUCN Red List.

== Description and taxonomy ==
It was formerly conspecific with the Mindanao brown dove but differs greatly in plumage and voice. This species has a gray crown, an orange belly and a light brown vent and undertail.

== Ecology and behavior ==
Almost nothing is known about this species but it is presumed to be a frugivore feeding on seeds and fruits. A male in breeding condition was collected in April.

== Habitat and conservation status ==
Its natural habitats are tropical moist lowland secondary forests and forest edge with it being less common in primary forest. It being more common in these areas shows that it is tolerant of degraded forests.

The IUCN Red List classifies this bird as an endangered species with population estimates of 500–2,500 mature individuals. This species' main threat is habitat loss, with wholesale clearance of forest habitats as a result of legal and illegal logging, mining and conversion into farmlands through slash-and-burn agriculture. Hunting and trapping also may threaten this species.

There are no protected areas in the archipelago, and there are no species specific conservation programs in place for this bird.
