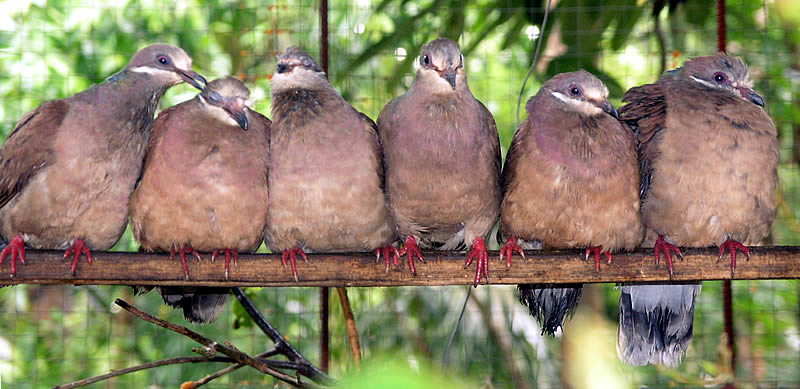
- White-eared brown dove (P. leucotis)

Scientific classification
- Kingdom: Animalia
- Phylum: Chordata
- Class: Aves
- Order: Columbiformes
- Family: Columbidae
- Subfamily: Raphinae
- Genus: Phapitreron; Bonaparte, 1854

Type species
- Columba leucotis Temminck, 1823

= Brown dove =

Genus of birds

Brown doves are members of the genus Phapitreron in the pigeon family. Their common name refers to their overall brown coloration. They are endemic to the Philippines. All brown doves are tree-dwellers, but the different species occupy different types of wooded habitats; some are more restricted to old-growth forest while other make use of secondary forest and other woodland. Their main diet is fruit. They tend to be solitary in their habits and can be elusive. Some species in this genus have conspicuous black and white stripes on their faces and iridescent neck feathers. Males and females look alike.

== Taxonomy ==
The genus Phapitreron was introduced in 1854 by the French naturalist Charles Lucien Bonaparte for the white-eared brown dove (Phapitreron leucotis). The genus name Phapitreron combines the genus name Phaps introduced by the English naturalist Prideaux John Selby in 1835 for the bronze-wing pigeons with the Ancient Greek trērōn meaning "pigeon".

The genus contains four species:

- White-eared brown dove (Phapitreron leucotis)
- Amethyst brown dove (Phapitreron amethystinus)
- Tawitawi brown dove (Phapitreron cinereiceps)
- Mindanao brown dove (Phapitreron brunneiceps) – split from the Tawitawi brown dove

Some ornithologists have split two of the above species:

- Buff-eared brown-dove (Phapitreron nigrorum) – split from the white-eared brown dove
- Short-billed brown-dove (Phapitreron brevirostris) – split from the white-eared brown dove
- Cebu brown-dove (Phapitreron frontalis) – split from the amethyst brown dove; listed as an EDGE species by the Zoological Society of London and Critically Endangered by the IUCN.
- Grey-breasted brown-dove (Phapitreron maculipectus) – split from the amethyst brown dove
