= Mount Pico de Loro =

Mountain in Luzon, Philippines

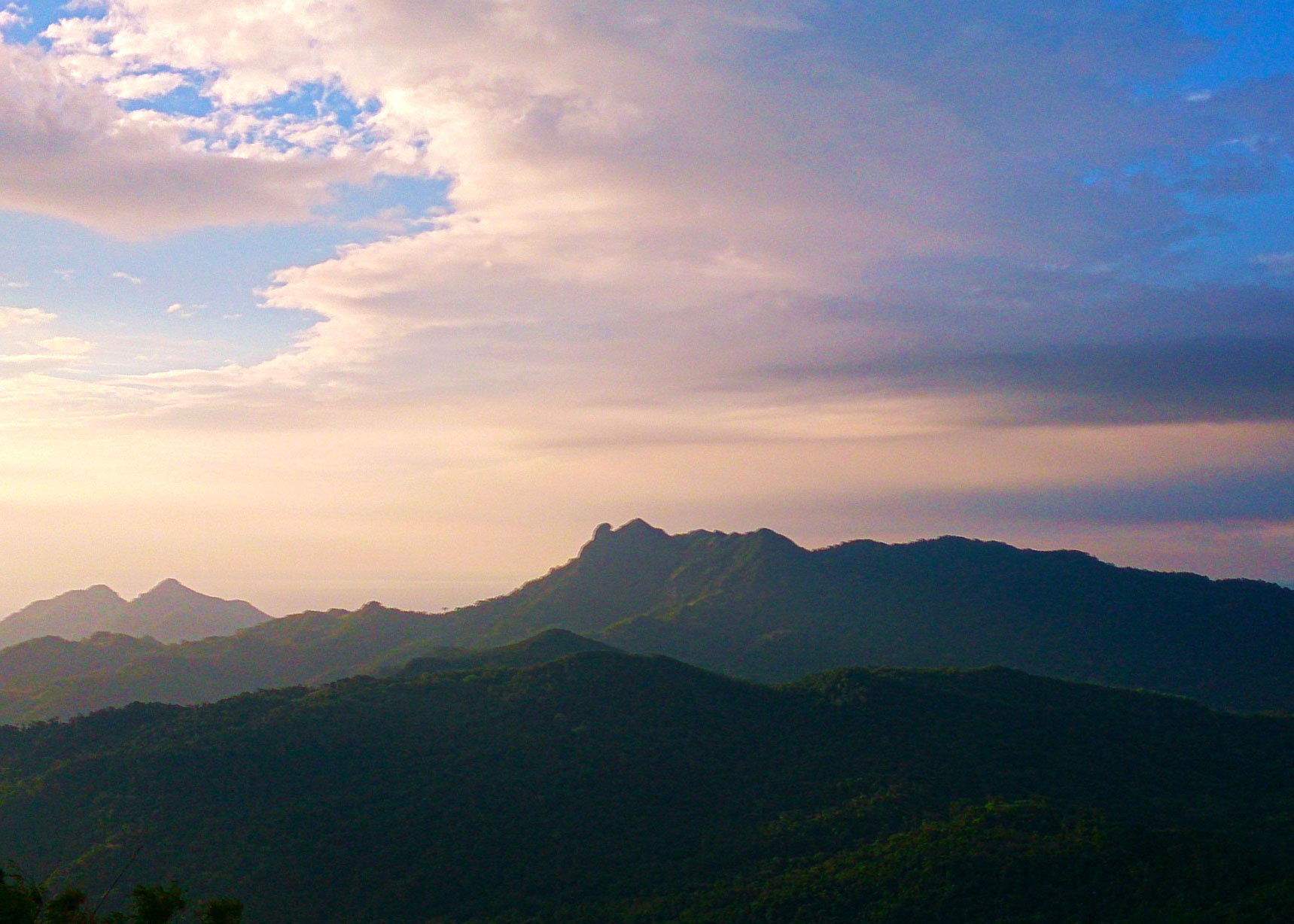

Highest point
- Elevation: 2,257 ft (688 m)
- Prominence: 1,640 ft (500 m)
- Coordinates: 14°12′51″N 120°38′47″E

Geography
- Location within Luzon Location within Philippines
- Location: Mounts Palay-Palay–Mataas-na-Gulod Protected Landscape, Luzon
- Country: Philippines
- Region: Calabarzon
- Provinces: Batangas; Cavite
- Municipalities: Maragondon; Nasugbu

Geology
- Mountain type: Stratovolcano
- Volcanic arc: Bataan Arc
- Last eruption: Unknown

Mount Pico de Loro, also known as Mount Palay-Palay, is a dormant volcano located on the border of Cavite and Batangas, in the island of Luzon, Philippines. It is the highest mountain in the province of Cavite, with an elevation of 2,257 ft (688 m) above sea level and the highest peak of the Mounts Palay-Palay–Mataas-na-Gulod Protected Landscape. The mountain is one of the ancient volcanic features of Bataan Arc.

== History ==
Pico de Loro was first named by Spanish sea-farers which means "Parrot's Beak" as its pointed summit resembles the shape of a parrot's beak from afar and it is commonly used as a signal by sea-farers to turn east to get to Manila Bay.

== Governance ==
Under the Proclamation No. 1315 s. 2007 of the Philippine government, the Mounts Palay-Palay–Mataas-na-Gulod Protected Landscape is placed under the protection and jurisdiction of the Department of Environment and Natural Resources.

== Geology ==
Pico de Loro is found within the Talahib Andesite rock formation (Avila, 1980). This is seen as being comparable to the Nasugbu Volcanic Complex (MGB, 2005). The Talahib Andesite is visible in western, central, and southeastern Batangas. It is overlain by the Mapulo Limestone (Avila, 1980), which is regarded to be identical to the Calatagan Formation in the upper sections of Talahib River's western branch and also along the Laiya River. The andesite crystal structure is vesicular and amygdaloidal, with flow banding. Additionally, fine-grained, porphyritic, and medium-grained equigranular phases are included. Intercalated with the flows are thin pyroclastic strata. Propylitization of andesite is widespread, resulting in the formation of chlorite and epidote. Generally, moderate silicification and pyritization occur along shear zones. This unit appears to be equivalent to Wolfe and others' (1980) Banoy Volcanics, which they date to the Middle to Late Miocene.

== Hiking activity ==
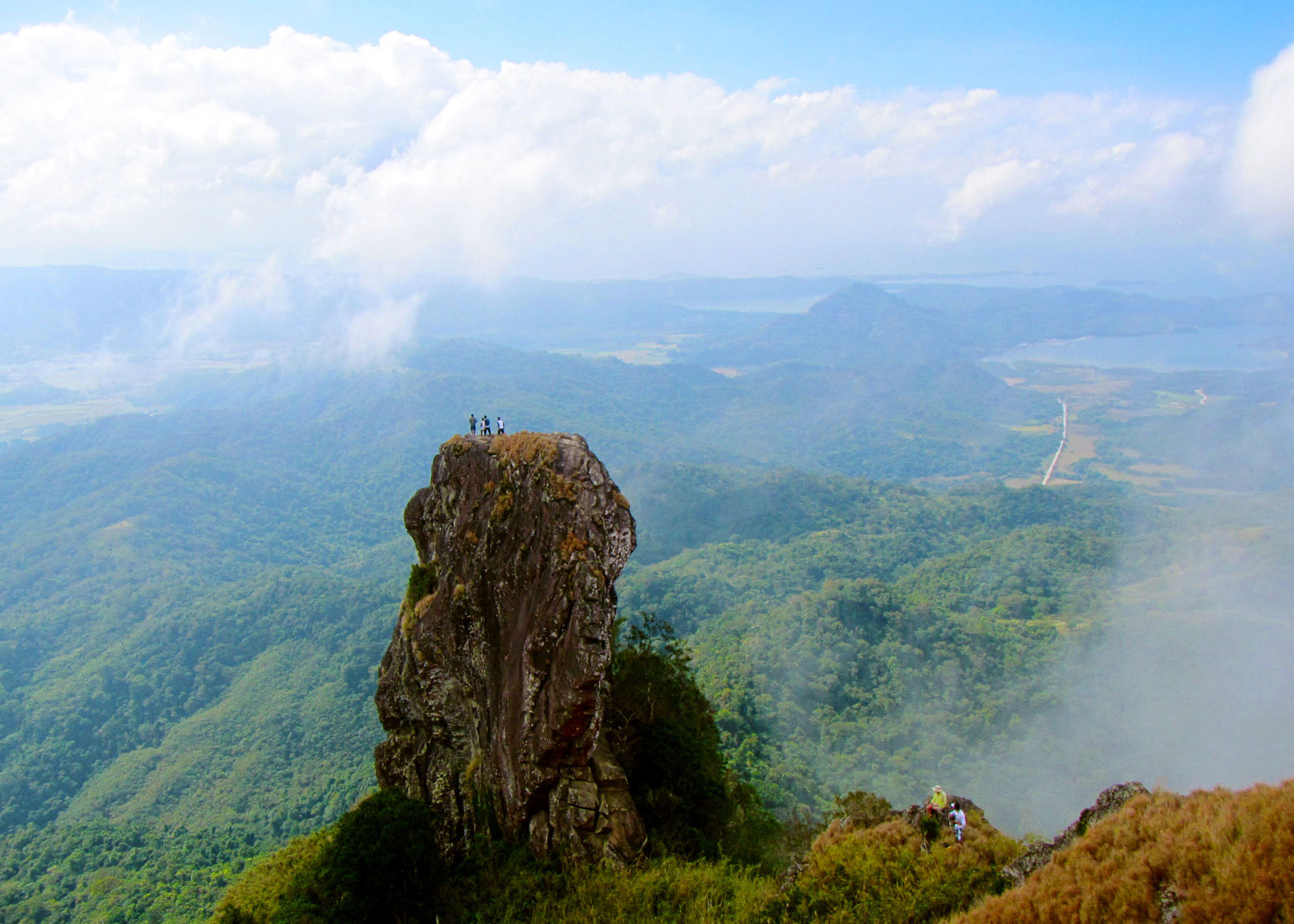
At the summit of Mt. Pico de Loro is a monolith. Also known as the Parrot's beak.

Near its summit is a lone vertical cliff feature called the Parrot's Beak or the Monolith that offers a 360-degree view of the protected landscape and the shores of Limbones Cove. Hiking has been closed for rehabilitation purposes since October 1, 2016. Hiking was still prohibited during the COVID-19 pandemic in 2020, which was extended until the middle of 2022 due to trail damage caused by Typhoon Jolina in 2021, and it was under renovation. On December 21, 2022, the Protected Area Management Board of Mounts Palay-Palay–Mataas-na-Gulod Protected Landscape declared a soft opening of hiking activities via online booking with limited participants. The full-open hiking activity is scheduled for January 12, 2023.

== See also ==
- List of mountains in the Philippines
- List of national parks of the Philippines
