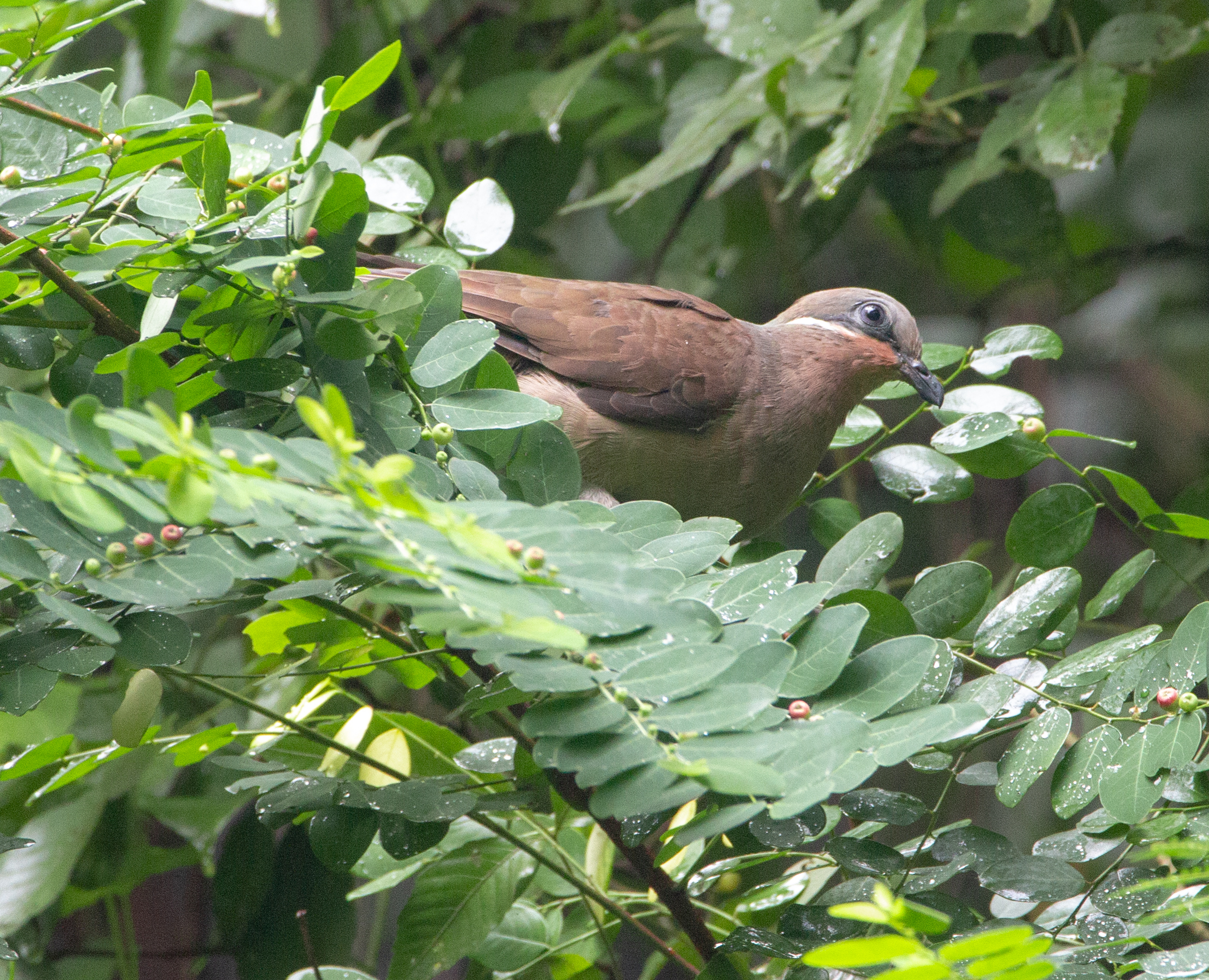
- P. l. leucotis
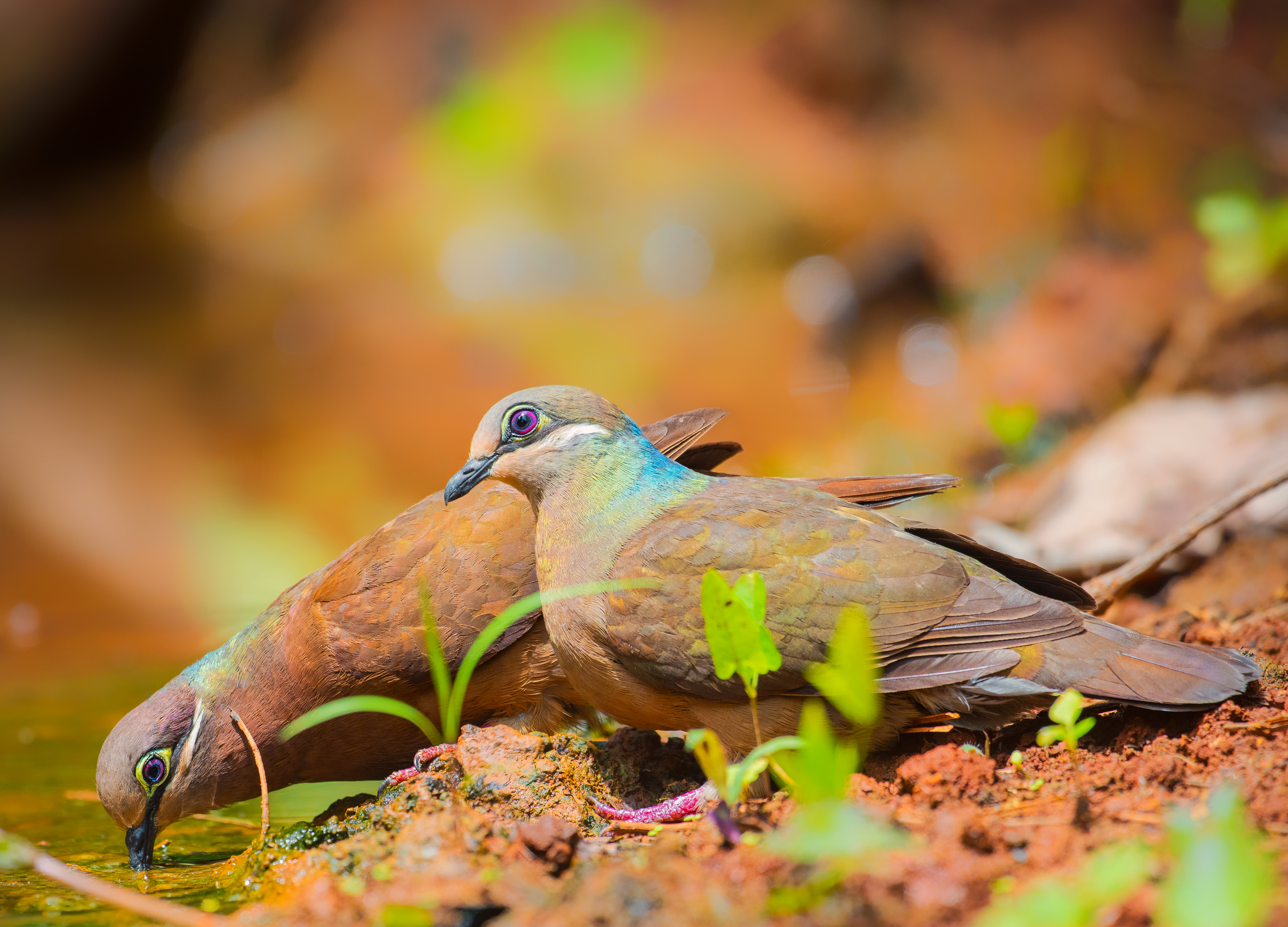
- P. l. brevirostris group

Conservation status
- Least Concern (IUCN 3.1)

Scientific classification
- Kingdom: Animalia
- Phylum: Chordata
- Class: Aves
- Order: Columbiformes
- Family: Columbidae
- Genus: Phapitreron
- Species: P. leucotis

Binomial name
- Phapitreron leucotis (Temminck, 1823)

= White-eared brown dove =

Species of bird

The white-eared brown dove (Phapitreron leucotis) is a species of bird in the family Columbidae. It is endemic to the Philippines where it is found across most of the country except Palawan, Sulu and Batanes. Its habitat is in lowland and montane forests. This species population is decreasing in number due to habitat loss, hunting and the capture for the illegal wildlife trade.

It is illegal to hunt, capture or possess white-eared brown doves under Philippine Law RA 9147.

== Description and taxonomy ==
=== Subspecies ===
Four subspecies are recognized:

- P. l. leucotis— Found on Luzon, Polillo, Alabat, Catanduanes, Lubang, Verde, Mindoro and Marinduque.
- P. l. nigrorum — Found on Tablas, Sibuyan, Ticao, Masbate, Panay, Calagnaan, Guimaras, Negros and Cebu; shorter bill, green-glossy nape, more metallic mantle, buff chin and throat, gray iris and a glossy gold-green breast
- P. l. brevirostris — Found on Samar, Biliran, Leyte, Calicoan, Bohol, Siquijor, Camiguin Sur, Dinagat, Siargao, Mindanao; whitish throat and forecrown, pink on nape and a brighter metallic blue mantle and has a shortbill
- P. l. occipitalis — Found on Basilan and Sulu; similar to but with a rich purple nape and warm brown iris

The Handbook of the Birds of the World recognizes it as three separate species leucotis as White-eared brown dove, nigrorum as Buff-eared brown dove brevirostris and occipitalis as Short-billed brown dove.

== Behaviour and ecology ==
Diet consists of seeds and fruits. Usually seen alone or in pairs but also may congregate in fruiting trees. Breeding season believed to be from March to June. Nest is a typical lazily built dove nest of lose arrangement of twigs on a branch. Lays 2 glossy white eggs.

== Habitat and conservation status ==
Its natural habitats at tropical moist lowland and montane primary forest and secondary forest up to 2,300 meters above sea level.

The IUCN Red List recognizes the three species but all are assessed as least-concern species. This is heavily trapped for the pet-trade and hunted for its meat yet remains locally common.
