= Howard and Moore Complete Checklist of the Birds of the World =

Book by Richard Howard

The Howard and Moore Complete Checklist of the Birds of the World
- The cover of the third edition
- Author: Richard Howard and Alick Moore
- Language: English
- Publisher: Christopher Helm
- Publication date: 2003
- Publication place: U.K.
- Media type: Print (Hardback)
- ISBN: 0-7136-6536-X
- OCLC: 59367637
- LC Class: QL677 .H75 2003

The Howard and Moore Complete Checklist of the Birds of the World is a book by Richard Howard and Alick Moore which presents a list of the bird species of the world. It was the first single-volume world bird list to include subspecies names, and until the publication of the 5th edition of James Clements' Checklist of Birds of the World was the only one to do so.

It is currently in its fourth edition (2013), and is published by Aves Press in the UK.

== First edition ==
The first edition was published in 1980, with a foreword by Leslie Brown. A revised edition was published in 1984.

== Second edition ==
Front cover of the second edition

The second edition was published in 1991, and a reprint was issued in 1994, and included an appendix with a further 282 changes.

The jacket paintings are by Martin Woodcock.

== Third edition ==
The third edition was published in 2003. It was edited by Edward C. Dickinson, with the assistance of four other regional compilers: David Pearson (covering Africa), James Van Remsen, Jr. (The Americas), Kees Roselaar (the Palearctic region) and Richard Schodde (Australasia); Dickinson himself acted as the regional consultant for Asia.

This edition starts with a foreword from Richard Howard (Alick Moore having died prior to this edition being prepared). A seven-page introduction is followed by a six-page chapter entitled "Avian Higher-level Phylogenetics and the Howard and Moore Checklist of Birds" by Joel Cracraft, F. Keith Barker and Alice Cibois, after which is a summary of the family structure used in this edition, in tabular form, giving numbers of genera and species. The bulk of the book, from pages 31 to 826 is the systematic list. A references list from pages 832 to 883 lists 3000 references used in the compilation of the checklist.

== Fourth edition ==
The fourth edition was published in two volumes in 2013 and 2014. The first volume (covering the non-passerines) was edited by Edward C. Dickinson and James Van Remsen, Jr. while the second volume (passerines) was edited by Edward C. Dickinson and Les Christidis. The volumes are available for download.
