= HBW and BirdLife International Illustrated Checklist of the Birds of the World =

Bird checklist

HBW and BirdLife International Illustrated Checklist of the Birds of the World is a list of the birds of the world published by Lynx Edicions in association with BirdLife International in two volumes in 2014 and 2016. It follows the 16-volume Handbook of the Birds of the World and is used as a base for the birds in the IUCN Red List of Threatened Species and many other organizations.
