= Mount Buntis =

Mountain in Luzon, Philippines

- Mt. Buntis
- Location within Luzon Location within Philippines

Highest point
- Elevation: 280 m (920 ft)
- Coordinates: 14.2381°N 120.7102°E

Geography
- Location: Luzon
- Country: Philippines
- Region: Calabarzon
- Province: Cavite
- Municipality: Maragondon

Mount Buntis is a mountain in Maragondon, Cavite, Philippines.

The mountain is part of the historical landscape connected with the execution of Philippine revolutionary leader Andrés Bonifacio and his brother Procopio Bonifacio in 1897. The precise location of their execution has been disputed, with historical accounts identifying nearby locations including Mount Buntis, Mount Nagpatong, and Mount Hulog. The Bonifacio Shrine and Eco-Tourism Park, which commemorates their execution, stands at the foot of Mount Nagpatong and Mount Buntis.
