= Polytechnic University of the Philippines Maragondon =

Public university in Cavite, Philippines

Polytechnic University of the Philippines Maragondon Campus
- Politeknikong Unibersidad ng Pilipinas, Sangay ng Maragondon (Filipino)
- Motto: Tanglaw ng Bayan
- Motto in English: Light of the Nation
- Type: Satellite campus
- Established: 1987
- President: Manuel Muhi
- Director: Agnes Y. Gonzaga
- Faculty: 60 (2026)
- Students: 1,910 (2026)
- Location: Maragondon, Cavite, Philippines; 14°16′33″N 120°44′02″E
- University Hymn: Imno ng PUP (PUP Hymn)
- Colors: Maroon and Gold
- Website: www.pup.edu.ph
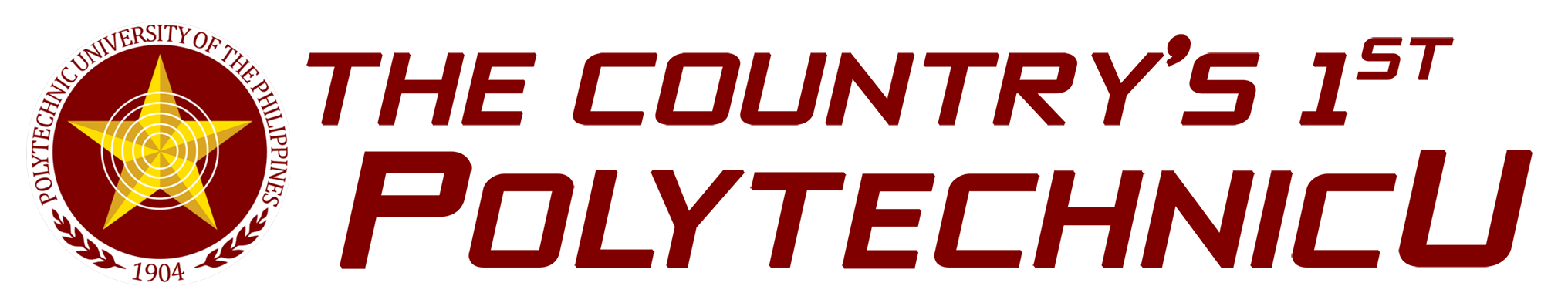

- Location in Luzon Location in the Philippines

The Polytechnic University of the Philippines - Maragondon Campus (Filipino: Politeknikong Unibersidad ng Pilipinas, Sangay ng Maragondon) is one of the two satellite campuses of the university system in Cavite. By 2026, they offer a total of 7 Bachelor programs and 3 Diploma courses. There are currently 60 faculty members and a total of 1,910 students enrolled within the university.

== History ==
In 1987, the by then PUP President Nemesio Prudente envisioned to build the university at his hometown in Rosario, Cavite, Hon. Teodoro C. Ramirez who is a friend of Prudente convinced him to bring the university instead to his town. Polytechnic University of the Philippine was established in Maragondon, Cavite.

In 2013, Polytechnic University of the Philippines - Alfonso Campus was established originally as an extension campus under the by then PUP - Maragondon Branch before operating as an autonomous campus.

== Undergraduate programs ==
College of Accountancy (CA)

- Bachelor of Science in Accountancy (BSA)**Defunct

College of Business (CB)

- Bachelor of Science in Business Administration - Major in Financial Management (BSBA-FM)
- Bachelor of Science in Business Administration - Major in Human Resource Management (BSBA-HRM)
- Bachelor of Science in Entrepreneurship (BSEntrep)

College of Education (COED)

- Bachelor of Science in Secondary Education Major in English (BSE-English)

College of Engineering (CE)

- Bachelor of Science in Electronics Engineering (BSEcE)
- Bachelor of Science in Mechanical Engineering (BSME)
- Bachelor of Science in Electrical Engineering (BSEE)

College of Technology (CT)

- Diploma in Office Management Technology (DOMT)
- Diploma in Information Technology (DIT)
- Diploma in Electrical Engineering Technology (DEET)

== Accredited Student Organizations ==
=== Governing Organizations ===
- Central Student Council (CSC)
- Junior Council Officers (JCO)

=== Constitutional Commissions ===
- Commission on Student Organizations and Accreditations (COSOA)
- Student Council Commission on Audit (COA)
- Student Council Commission on Election (COMELEC)

=== Student Publication ===
- The Forum

=== Academic Organizations ===
- Alliance of Entrepreneurship Students (AES)
- Association of Electrical Engineering Students (AEES)
- Association of Technology Students (ATS)
- College of Education Students' Society (CESS)
- Junior Financial Executives Institute of the Philippines (JFINEX)
- Junior Institute of Electronic Engineers of the Philippines (JIECEP)
- Junior People Management Association of the Philippines (JPMAP)
- Junior Philippine Society of Mechanical Engineers (JPSME)
- Junior Philippine Institute of Accountants (JPIA)**Defunct

=== Non-Academic Organizations ===
- Kalasag Christian Fellowship (KCF)
- Kaunlaran Dance Artist (KDA)
- Manga, Anime, and Gaming Enthusiasts (MAGE)
- Madagundong Chorale (MADACHOR)
- Musika ng mga Iskolar ng Bayan (MUSIKOLAR)
- Membership for Outstanding Development, Eco servitude, and Love for Others (MODELO)
- Radio Engineering Circle (REC)
