= Maragondon Church =

Roman Catholic church in Cavite, Philippines

- Our Lady of the Assumption Parish Church
- Parroquia de Nuestra Señora de la Asunción (Spanish)
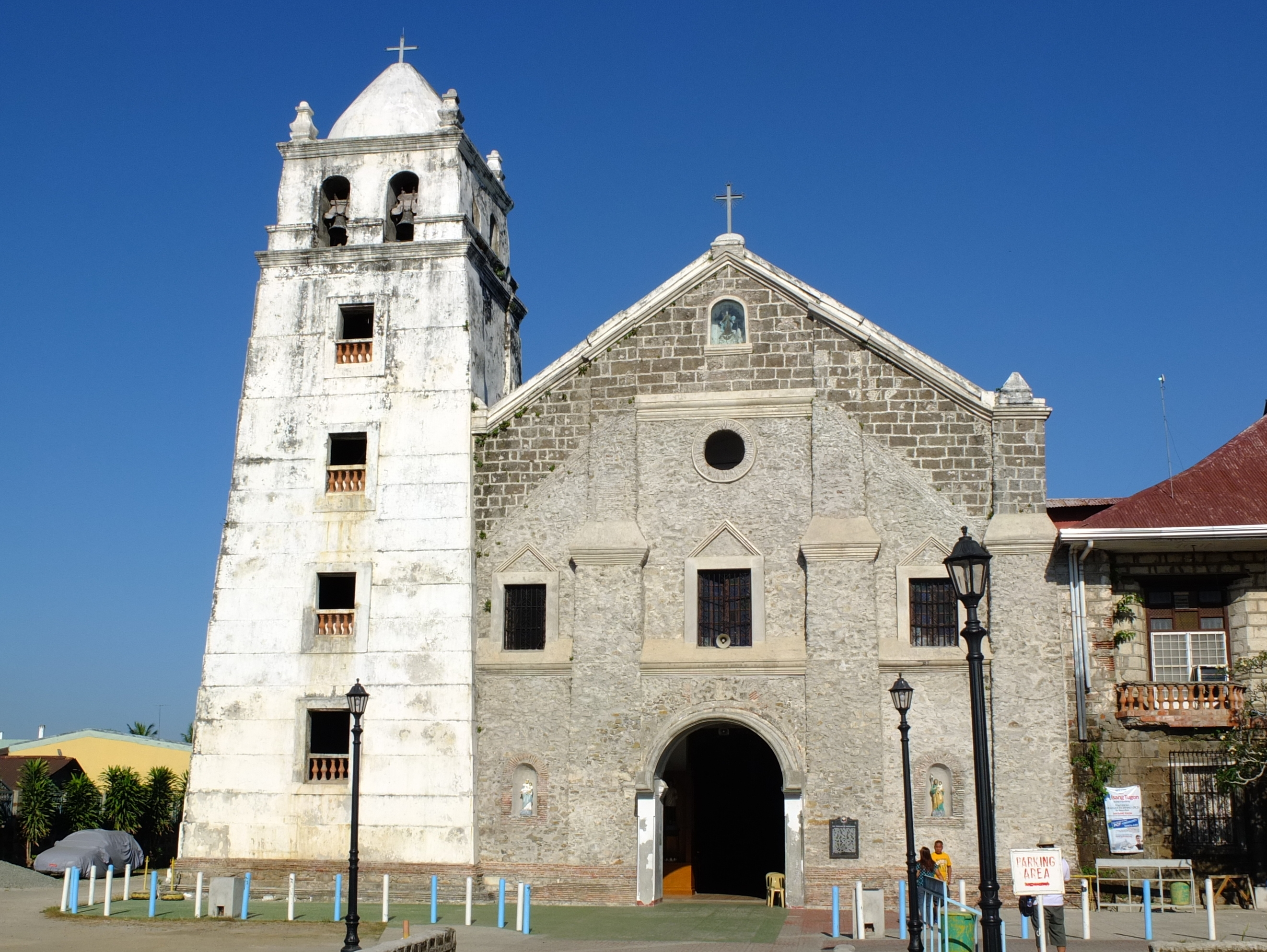
- Church façade in 2015

- Location in Luzon Location in the Philippines
- 14°16′26″N 120°44′00″E
- Location: Maragondon, Cavite
- Country: Philippines
- Denomination: Roman Catholic

History
- Status: Parish
- Dedication: Our Lady of Assumption
- Consecrated: 1581

Architecture
- Functional status: Active
- Heritage designation: National Cultural Treasure
- Architectural type: Church building
- Style: Baroque
- Completed: 1714

Specifications
- Materials: Masonry

Administration
- Archdiocese: Roman Catholic Archdiocese of Manila
- Diocese: Roman Catholic Diocese of Imus

Clergy
- Priest: Jerry C. Belen

Our Lady of the Assumption Parish Church, commonly known as Maragondon Church, is a Roman Catholic church and in the municipality of Maragondon, Cavite, Philippines declared by the National Museum as a National Cultural Treasure. It is under the jurisdiction of the Diocese of Imus.

== History ==
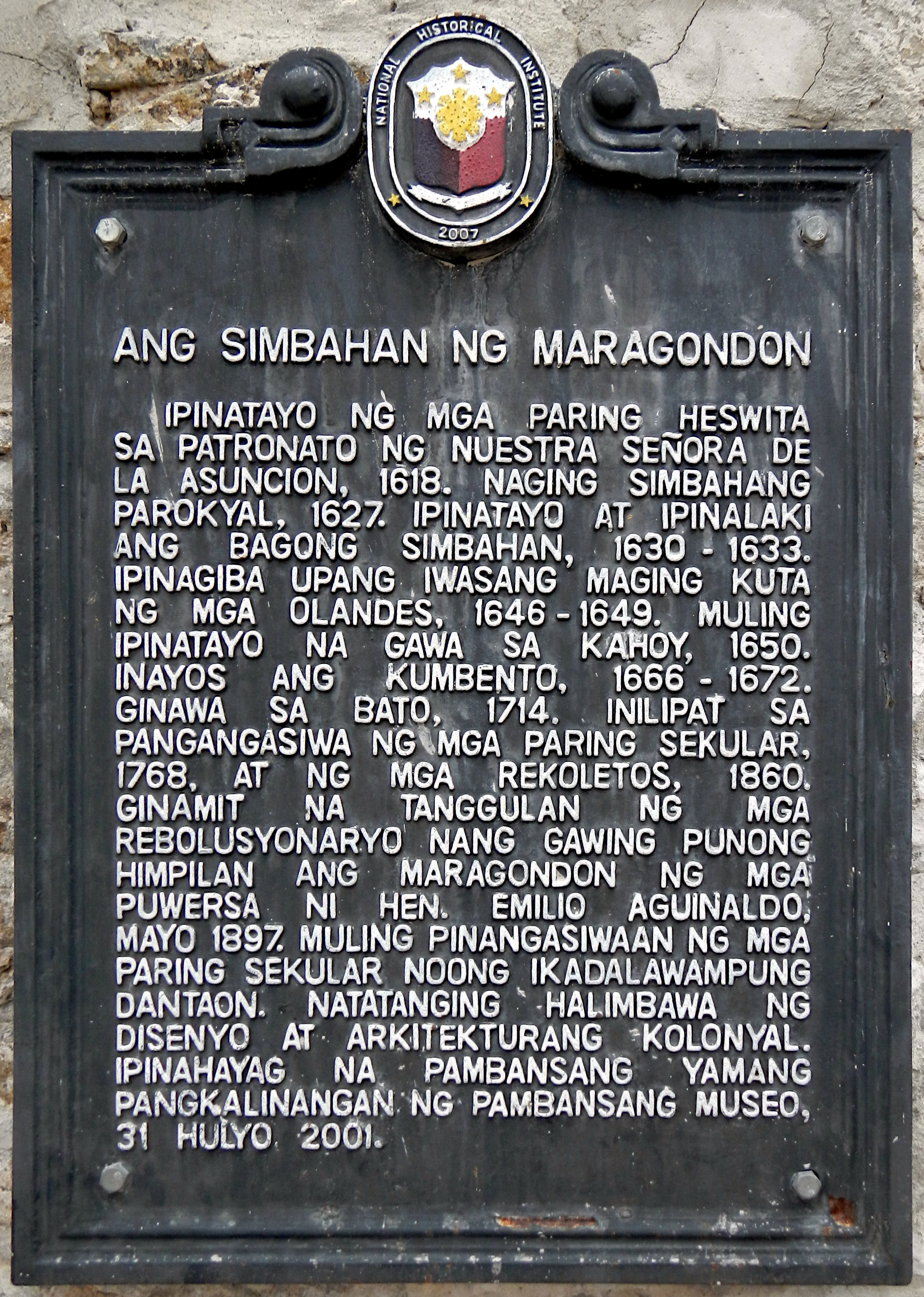
Church NHI historical marker installed in 2007

Before 1611 Maragondon was established as a separate town from Silang by the Jesuit Angelo Armano. Before this year the Franciscans were already actively evangelizing the area. In 1630 a second church with more elaborate furnishings was completed. During this year hacienda in Looc, straddling the boundaries of Batangas and Cavite, bequeathed to the Jesuits’ Colegio de Manila, was added to Maragondon's jurisdiction. In 1633 a new and bigger church was built to replace the older and smaller one, the church stone for some time between 1646 and 1649. The government ordered its demolition for fear that the Dutch, who were at war with Spain, would use it and other churches near Manila for fortification. The orders were apparently implemented because on May 16, 1650, a license was given to the Jesuits to build a house and church of wood in Maragondon to replace the one that had been demolished.

Repairs were made on the convent between 1666 and 1672. In 1687 another church was begun although the construction was interrupted; only in 1714 was it completed. The church was repaired a number of times but data on the renovation are sketchy. After 1860 the Recollect added windows with colored glass panes, and set these in a wooded frame decorated with a quail on a plate, the attribute of San Nicolas de Tolentino. ”

The secular priest de los Reyes also did some repairs probably during the convocation of the second Vatican Council which was commemorated in the Philippines with a jubilee year. To commemorate the event, a roof beam was emblazoned with inscriptions. ”

During the Philippine Revolution, revolutionary leader Andres Bonifacio and his brother Procopio Bonifacio were detained at the church following their court-martial in Maragondon before being executed in May 1897.

In 2025, the church’s pulpit, which dates from the 18th century, was destroyed after its supporting beams gave way, causing it to fall and break apart.

== Architectural details ==
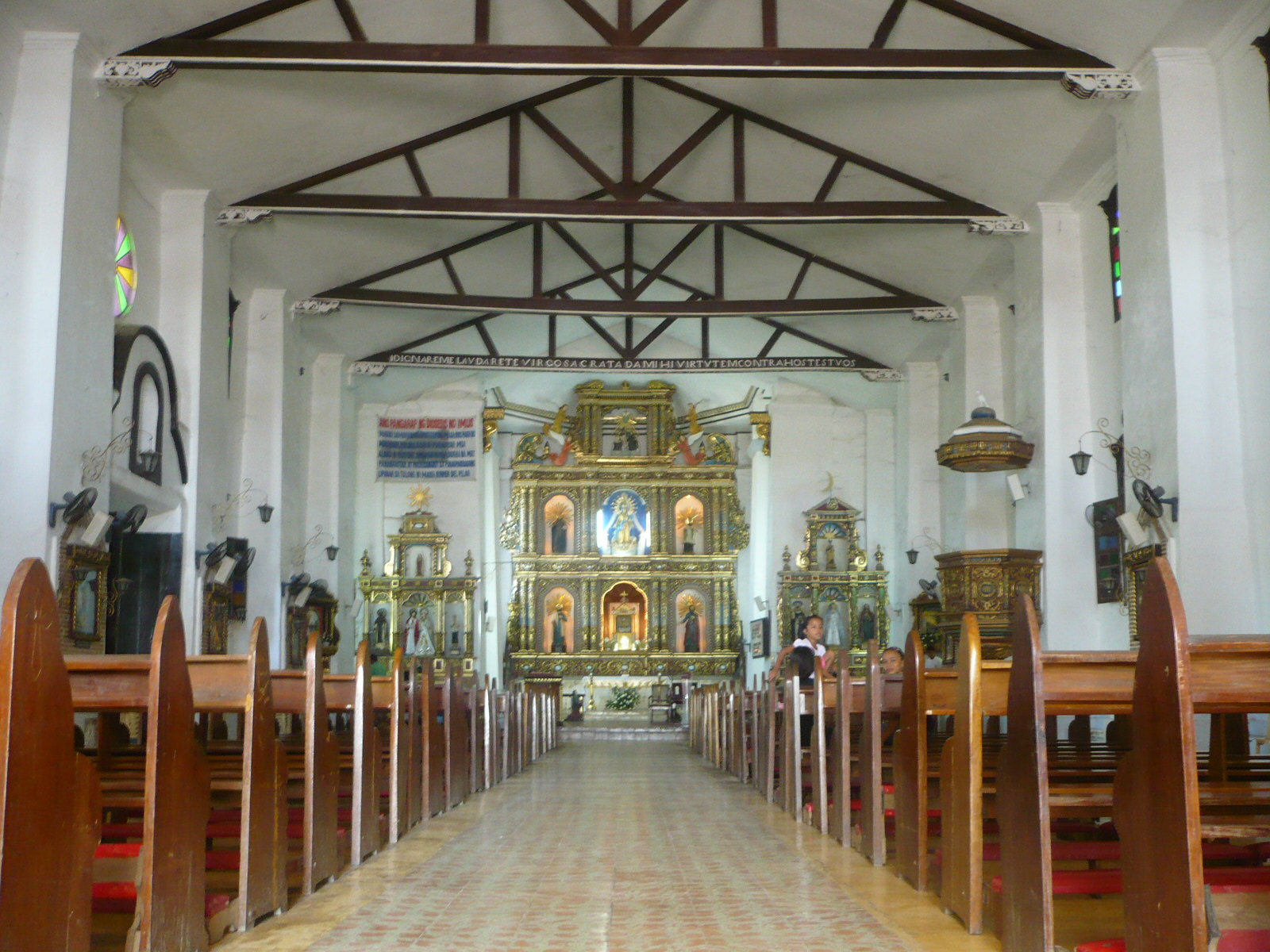
Church interior in 2011

Maragondon is unique among Jesuit churches for its proportion. The façade is narrow but tall, not squatty as in other churches. To the left of the façade is the taller bell tower with no clear divisions between the stories. The bell tower has a quadrilateral shaft that tapers upward with four corners ending with finials.

In contrast to the simplicity of its façade is the ornate door, divided into boxes, with floral designs of different shapes and ships and castles carved on it. Both in and out, the church fabric made of river stones are covered with a layer of paletada (stucco).

The elevation found in the façade is emphasized in the interior by the use of pilasters that taper the upwards. This produces a dizzying effect, as the pillars appear to soar up and sway. The main roof beams are exposed and emblazoned with biblical and commemorative captions. The door leading from sanctuary to sacristy is also carved with flowers enclosed in boxes.

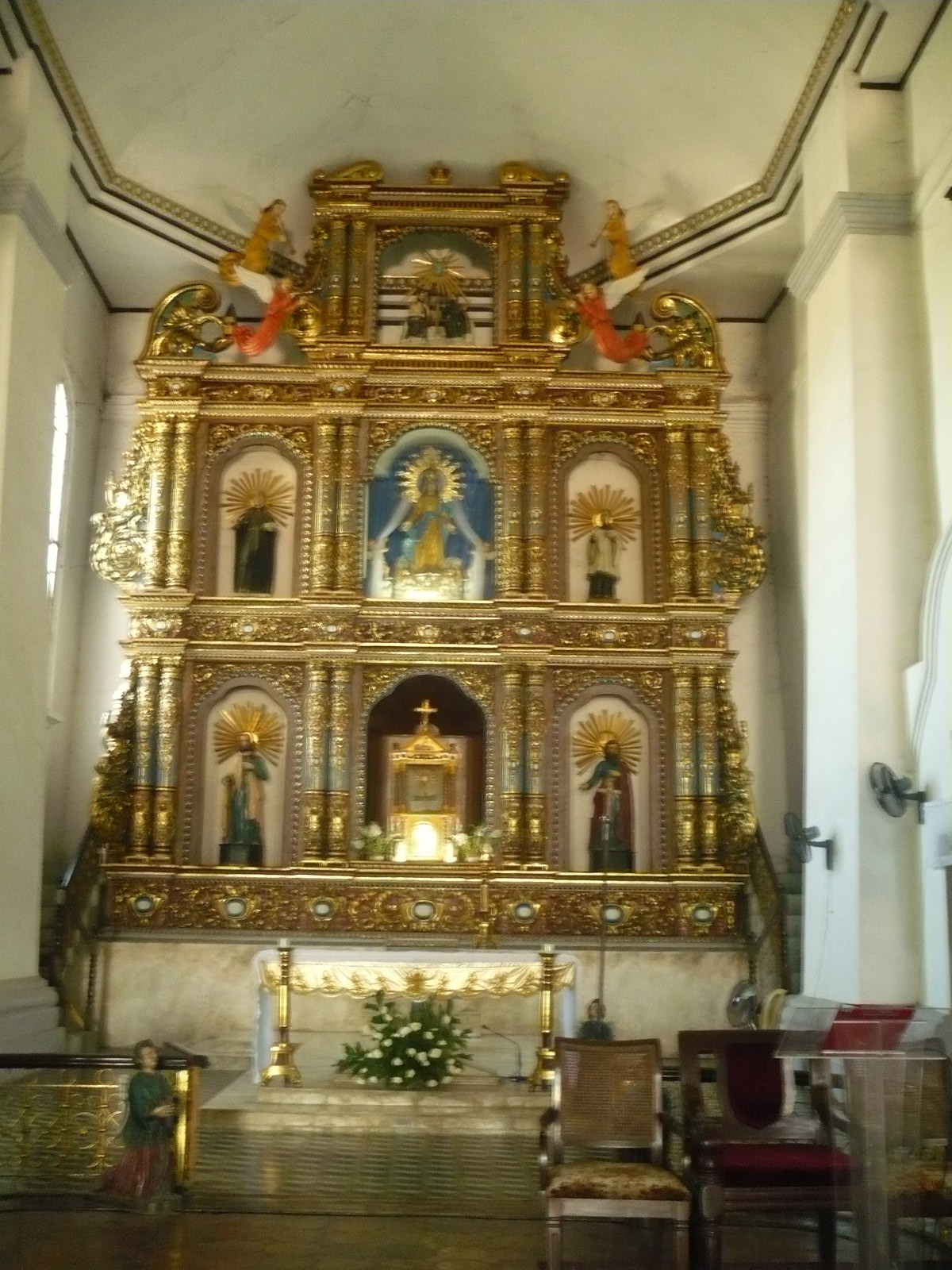
Retablo mayor

There are three church retables, all brightly polychromed. The image of the Assumption of Mary is placed in the main retable, in the main niche. An image of San Ignacio (St. Ignatius Loyola) to the left and an image of San Luis Gonzaga (St. Aloysius Gonzaga) to the right are also in the main retable. The main retable was decorated using salomonica columns, foliage, and angels with trumpets.

Also polychromed in red, blue, gold, and green, is an octagonal pulpit, located at the right side of the church. Its panel decoration includes the names of Jesus and Mary in monograms. The bottom of the pulpit is decorated with swirling foliage that end in an inverted pineapple.

A cross, dated 1712, is found near the church's main entrance. Part of the convent looks older than the rest. The older part is made of rubble while the newer part is cut stone brick. An elegant staircase of stone and tile are found in the older part. A newer sacristy was added. There are remains of an old defensive wall and a blockhouse that surrounds the quadrangle formed by the church and convent.

== Gallery ==
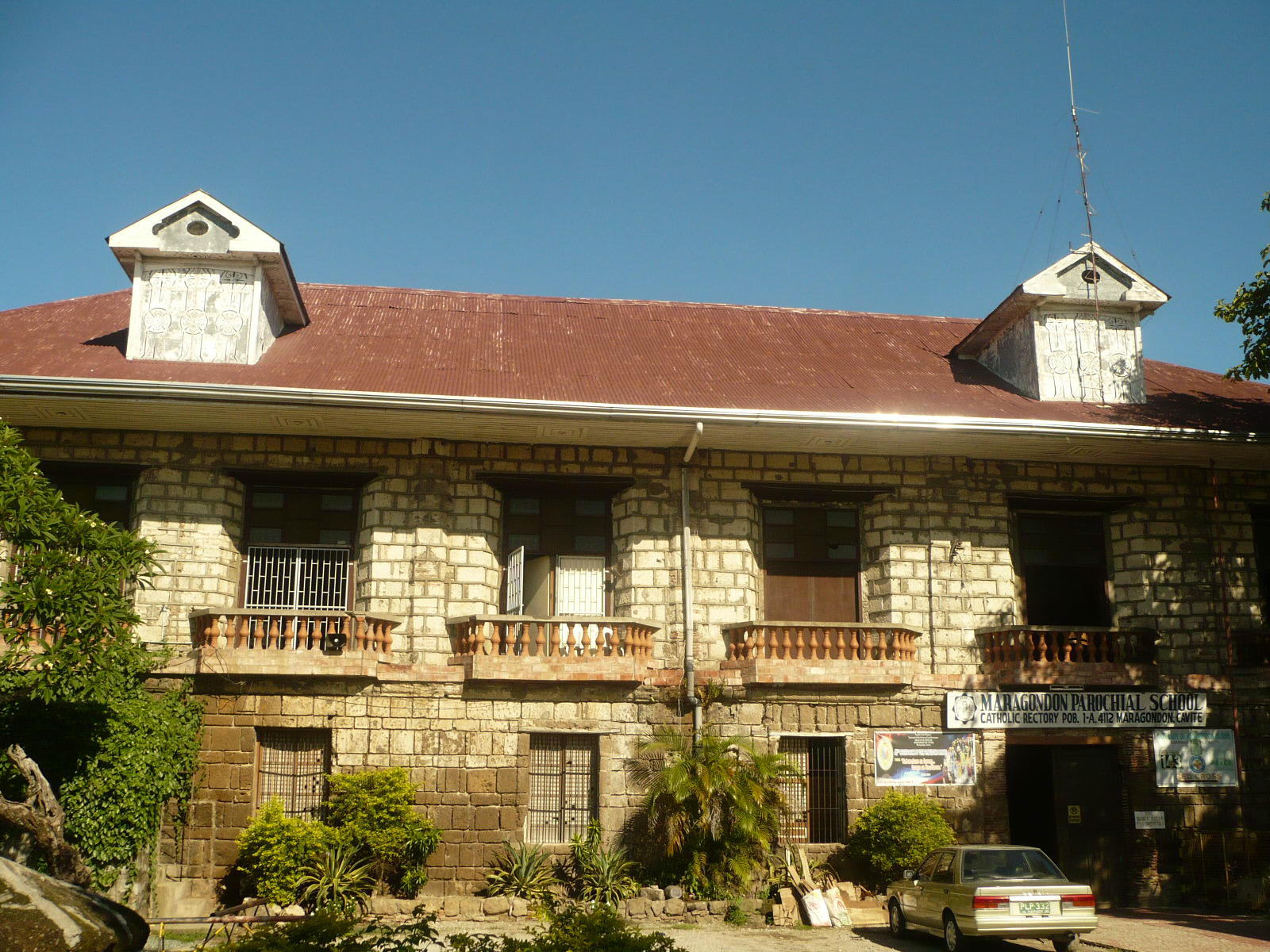
Convent

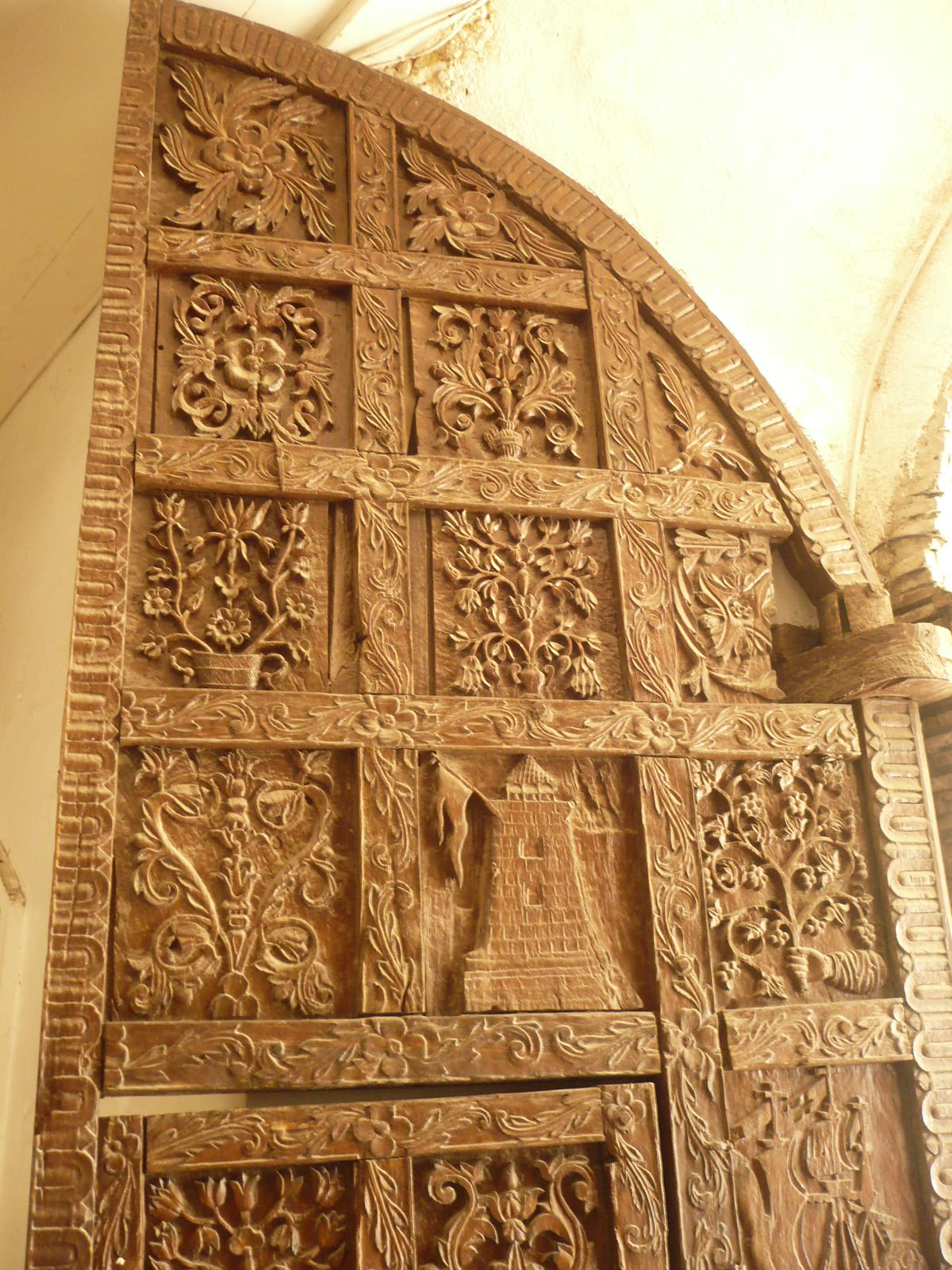
Main door

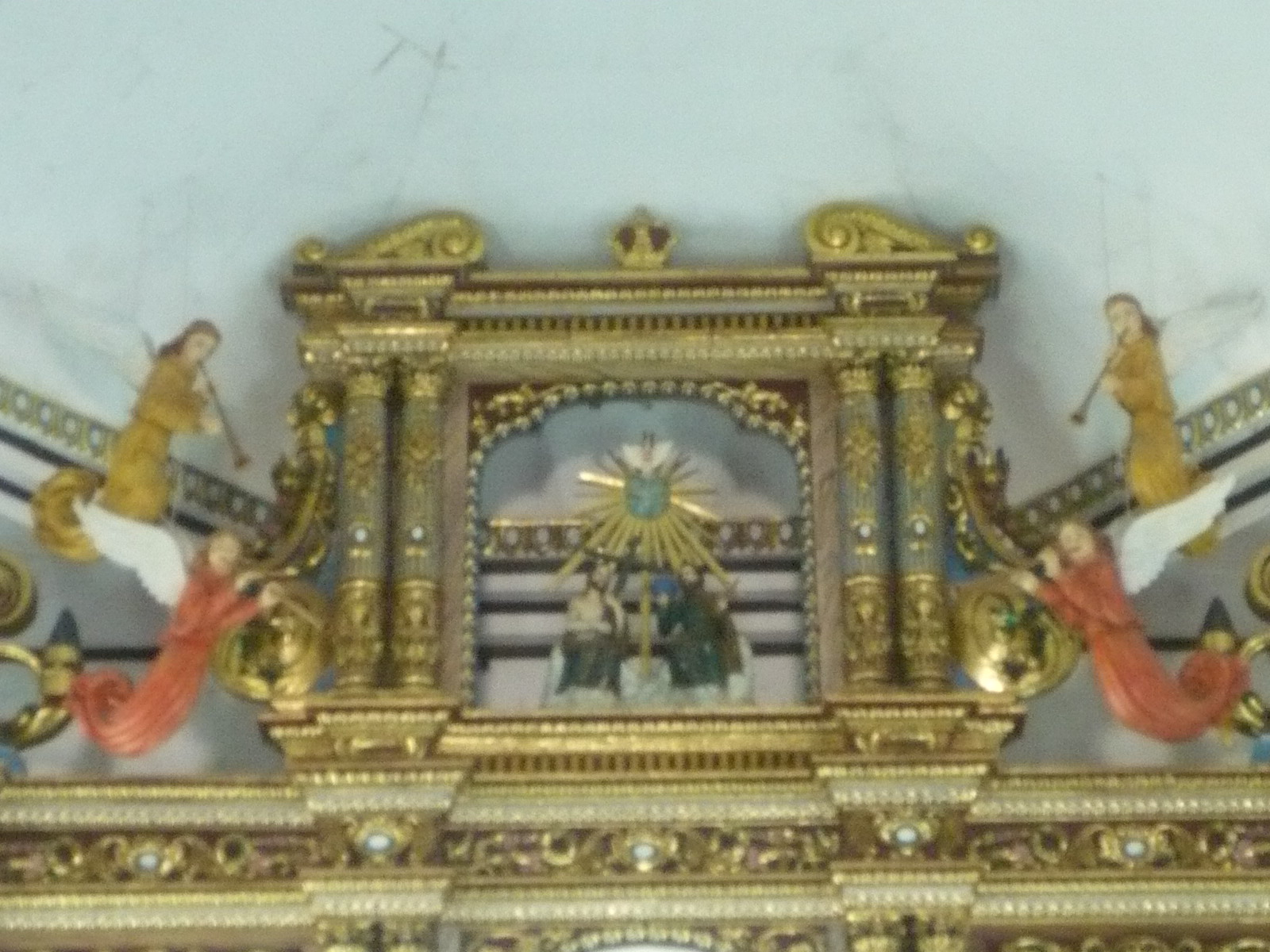
Holy Trinity detail on the polychromed retablo

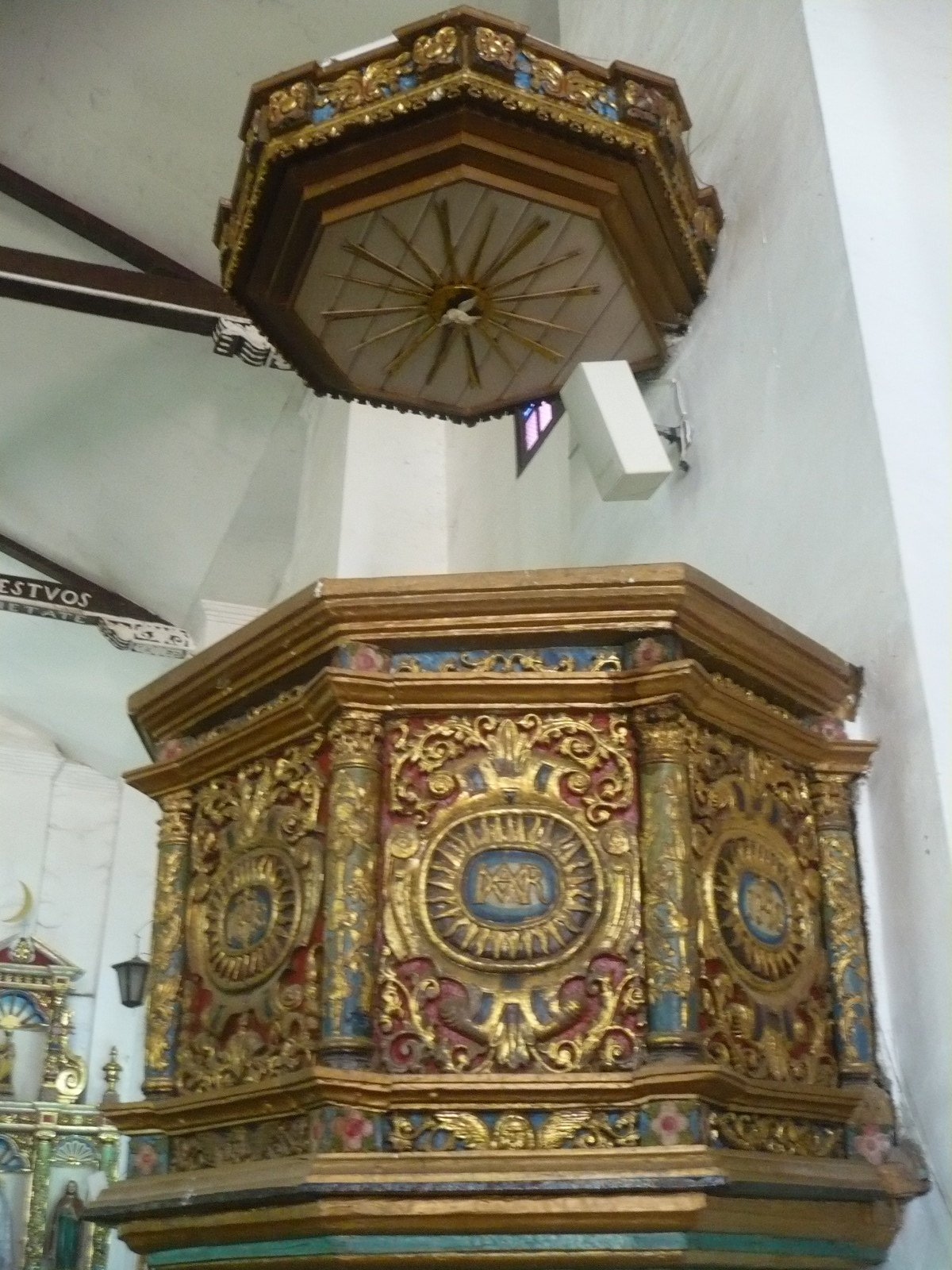
Church pulpit

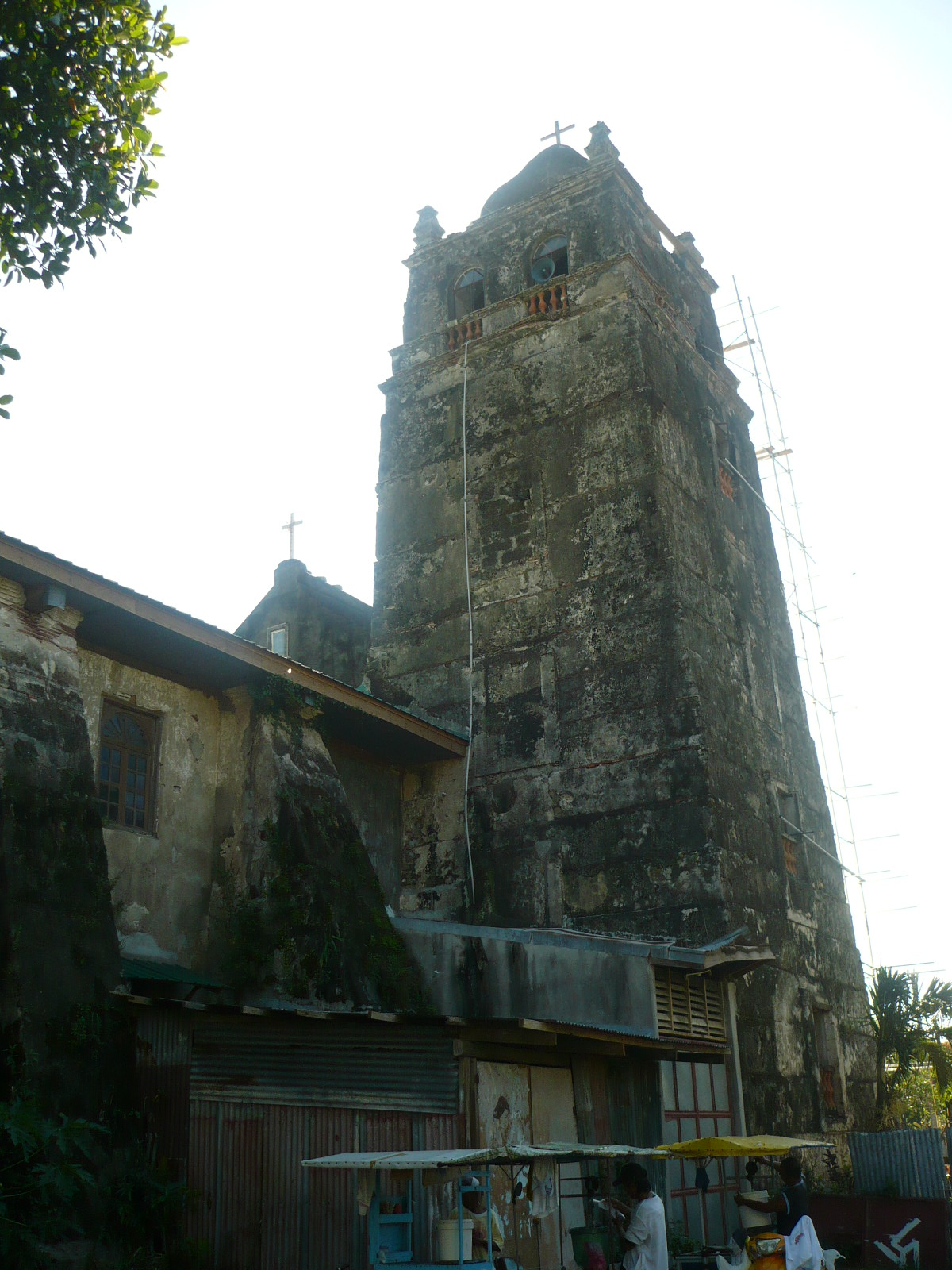
Bell tower
