= Bonifacio Shrine and Eco-Tourism Park =

Memorial shrine and eco-tourism park in Cavite, Philippines

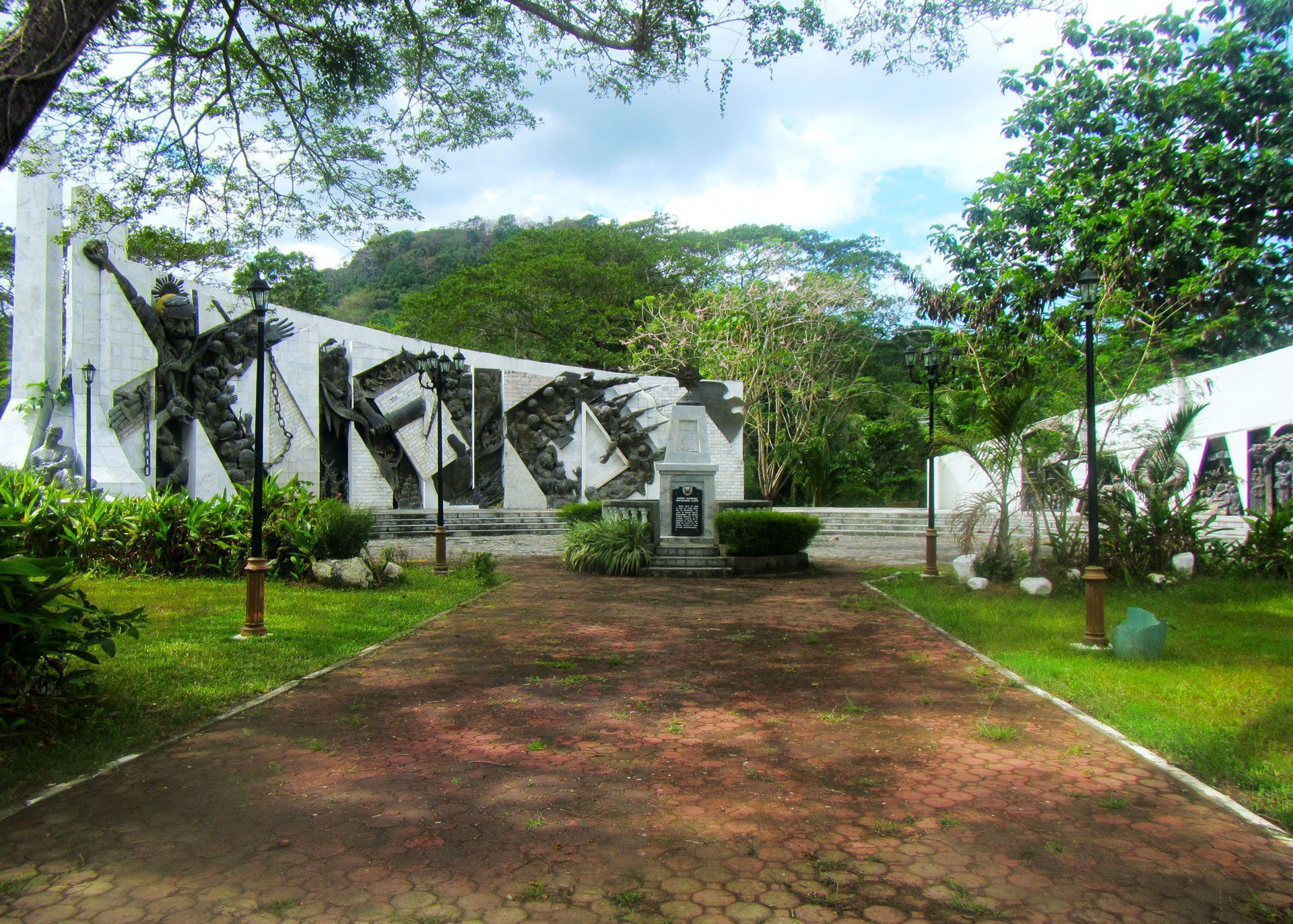
- Interactive map of Bonifacio Shrine and Eco-Tourism Park
- Type: Shrine and eco-tourism
- Location: Maragondon, Cavite, Philippines
- Coordinates: 14°15′46″N 120°43′05″E
- Designated: 2023

Bonifacio Shrine and Eco-Tourism Park is a historical and ecological landmark located at the foot of Mount Nagpatong and Mount Buntis in Maragondon, Cavite, Philippines. The shrine is dedicated to Filipino revolutionary leader Andrés Bonifacio (1863–1897). It marks the site where Bonifacio and his brother, Procopio, were executed in 1897.

== History ==
The Bonifacio Shrine and Eco-Tourism Park has long been built, and was only rehabilitated in 2023 by Tourism Infrastructure and Enterprise Zone Authority.

The shrine was believed to be the site where Bonifacio and his brother Procopio were executed. It hosts a historical marker that the Philippines Historical Committee, now the National Historical Commission of the Philippines (NHCP), installed in 1953 to denote the site of execution.

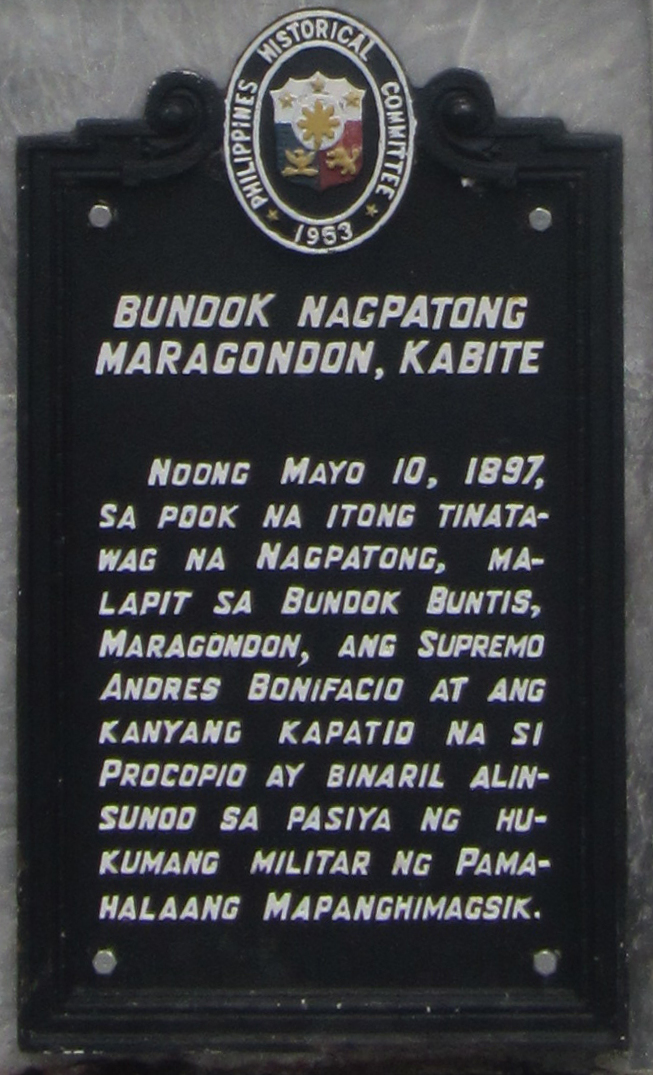
Historical marker
