= Maragondon =

Municipality in Cavite, Philippines

- Municipality
- Municipality of Maragondon
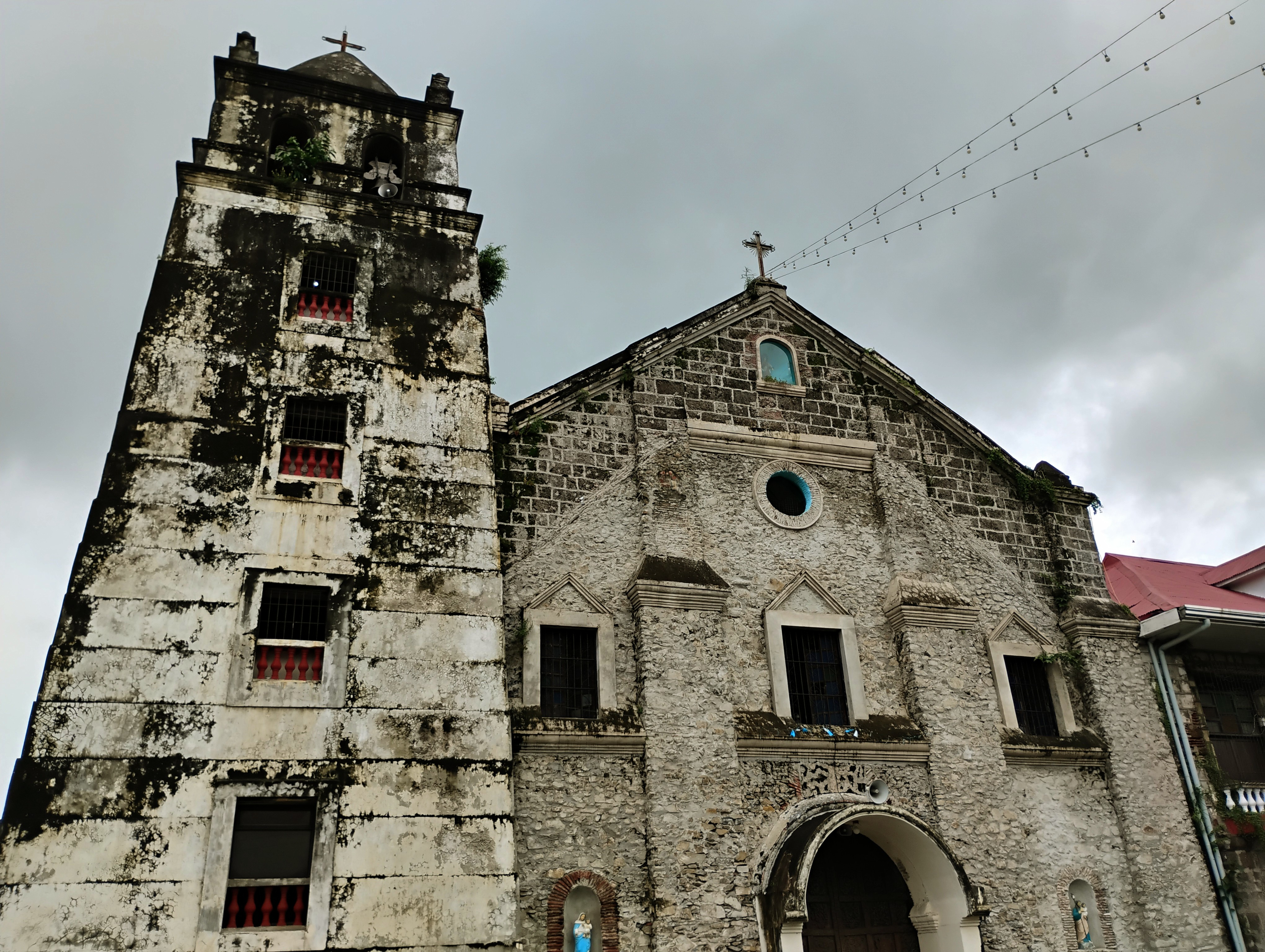
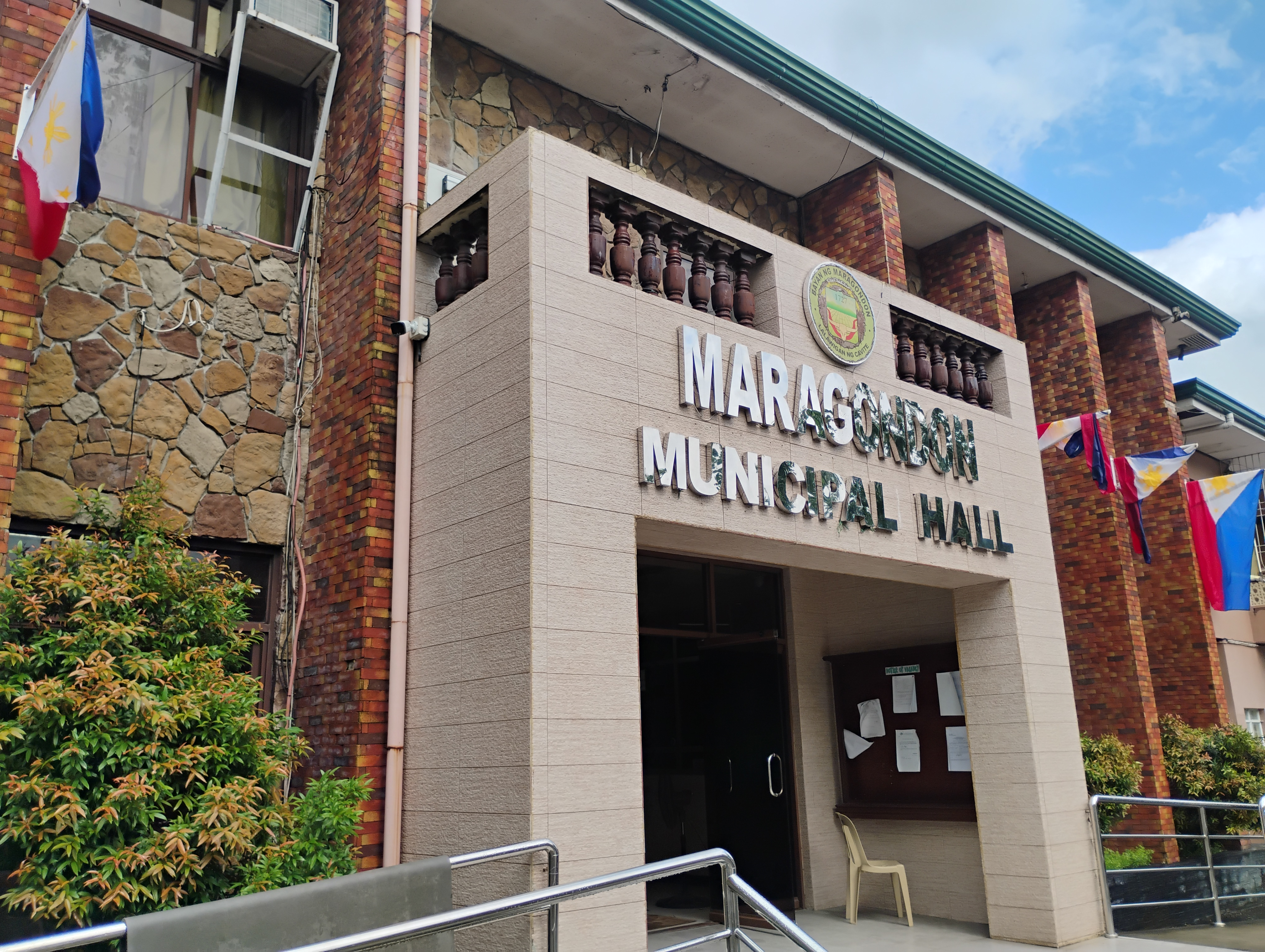
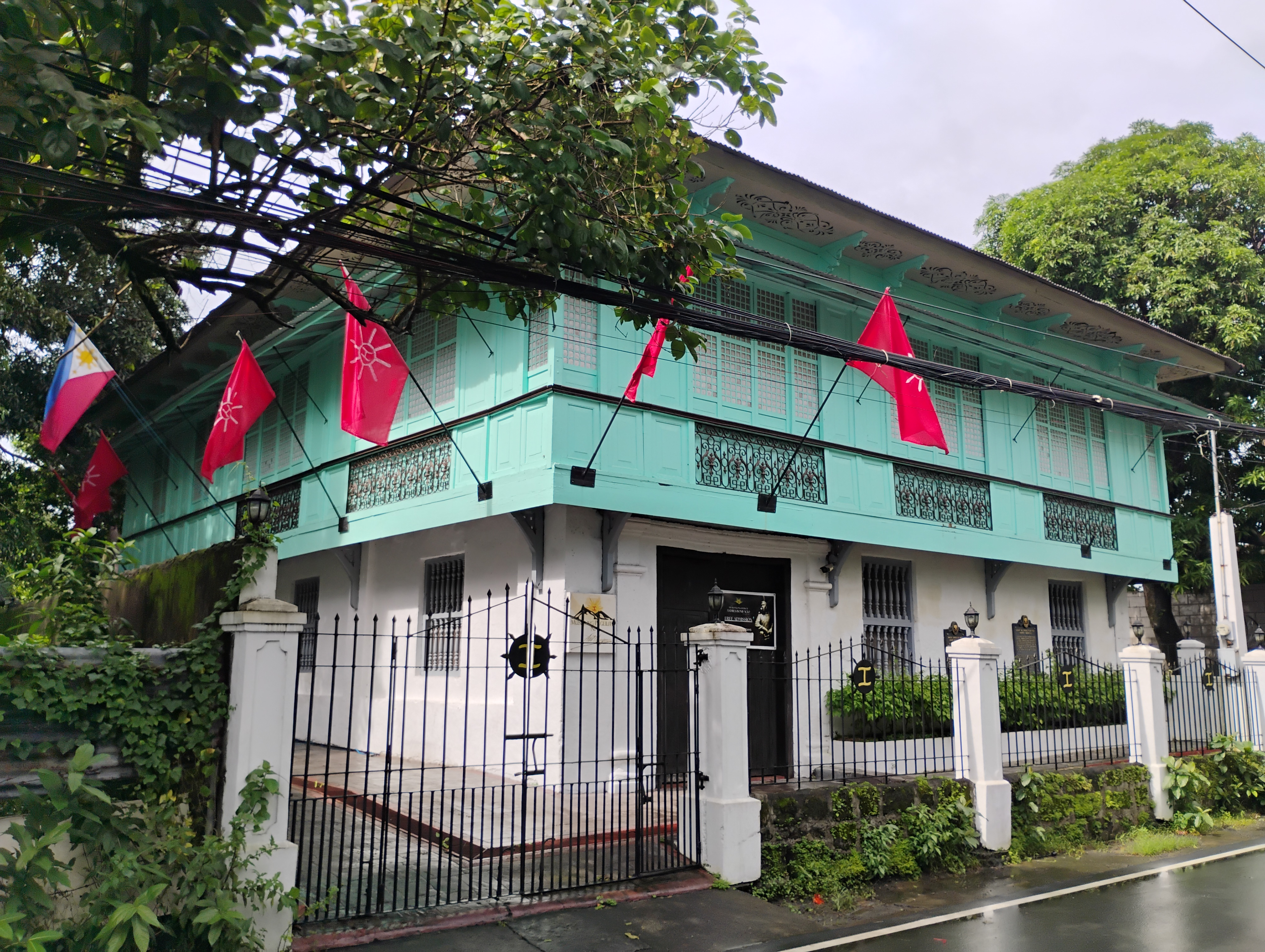
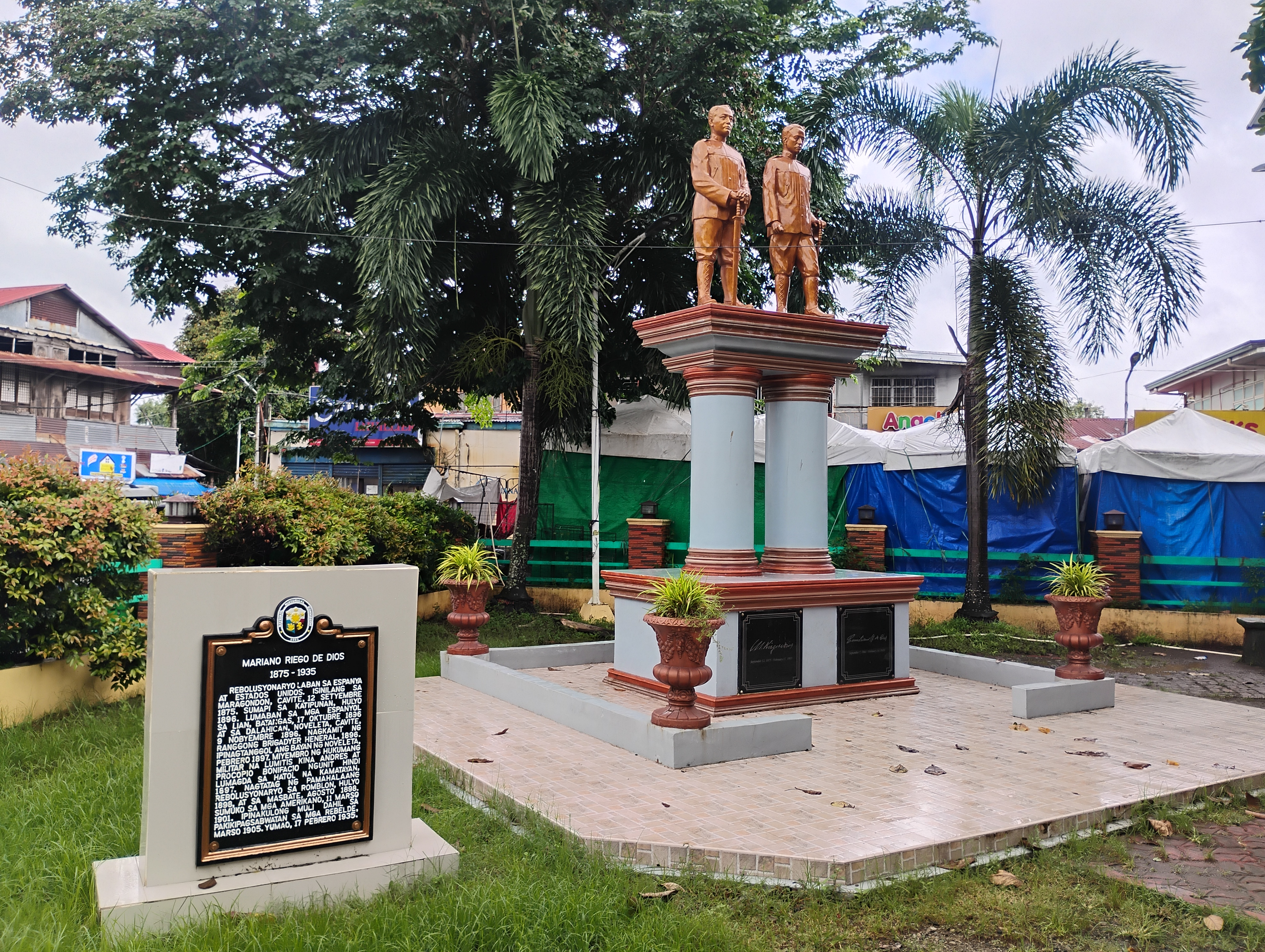
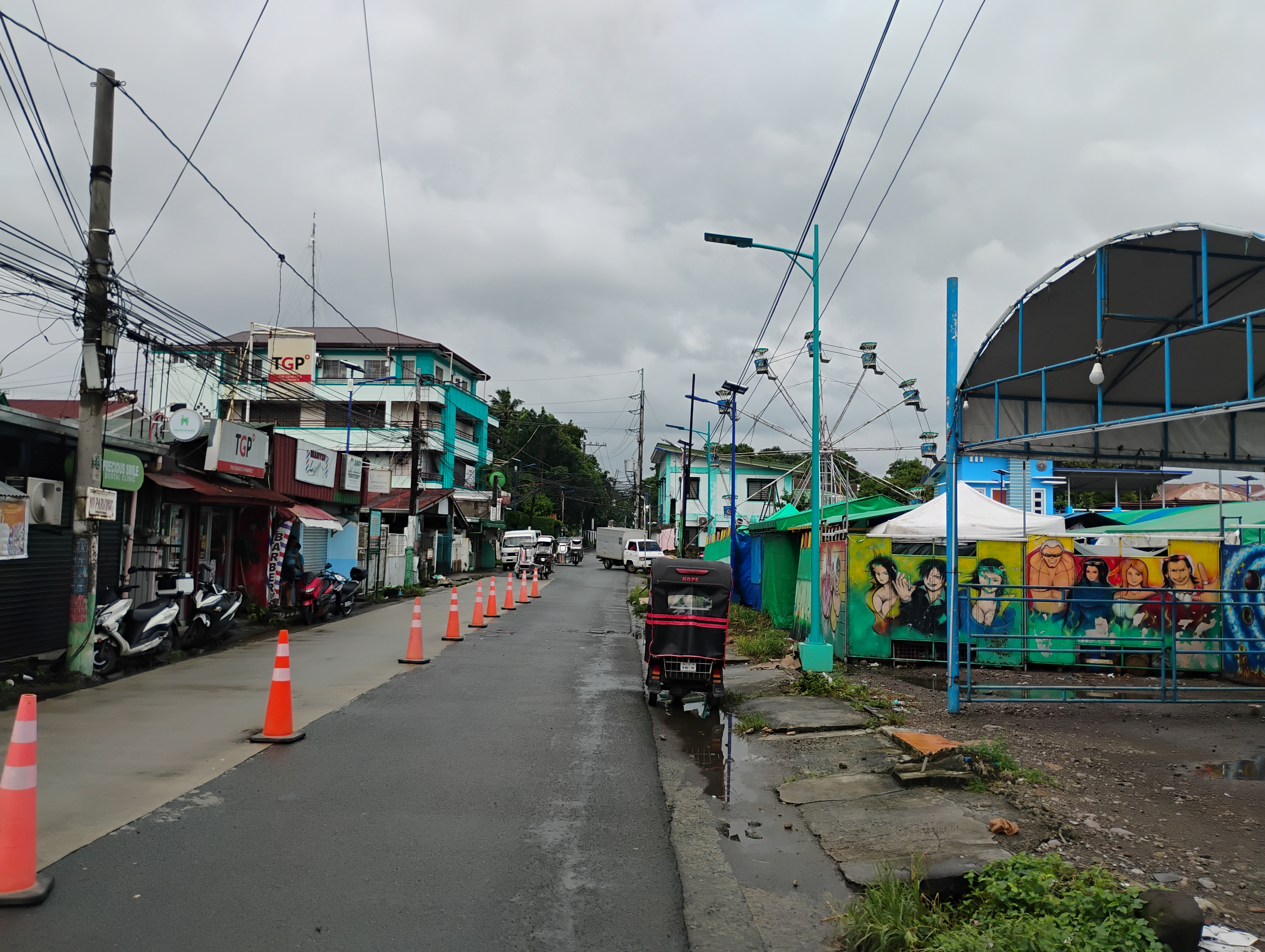
- Our Lady of the Assumption Parish Church Maragondon Municipal Hall Bonifacio Trial House Maragondon Town Plaza Maragondon Town Proper

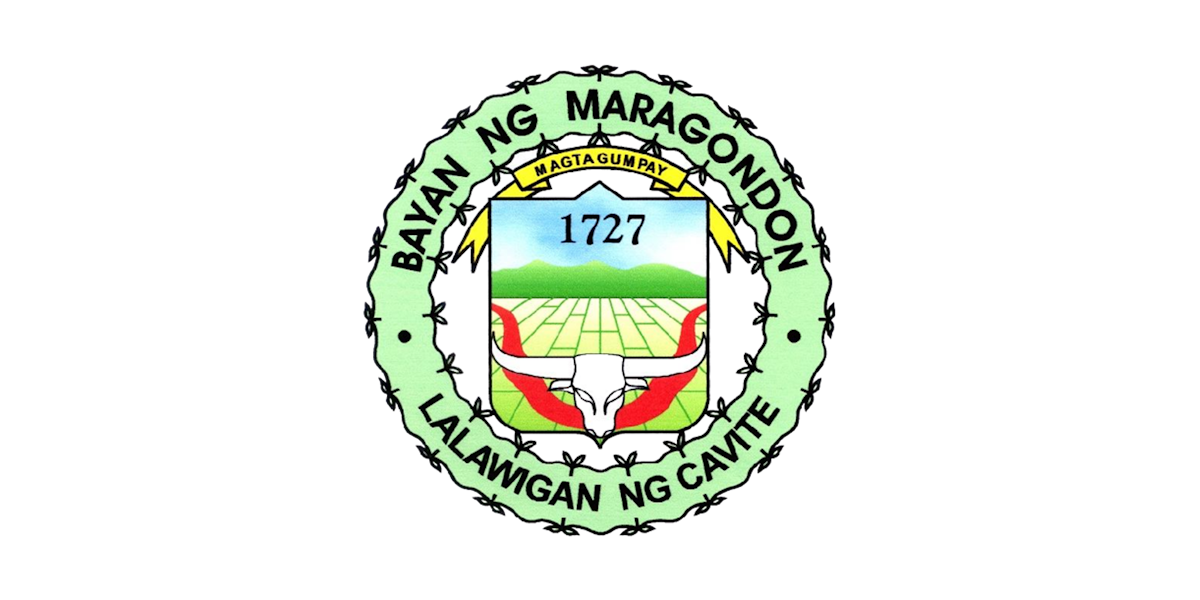
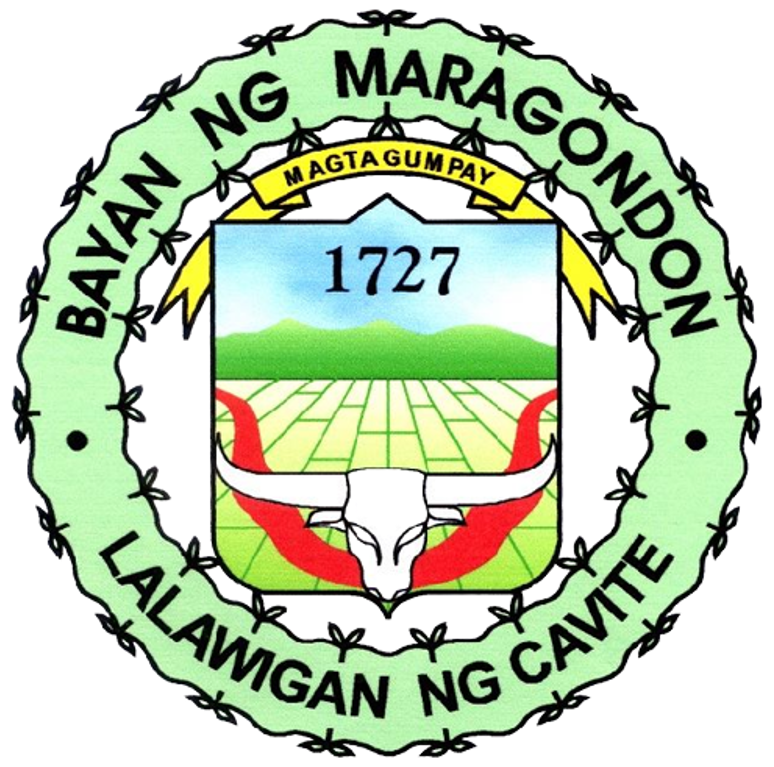
- Flag Seal
- Nickname: Historic Town & Wildlife Sanctuary
- Map of Cavite with Maragondon highlighted
- Interactive map of Maragondon
- Location within the Philippines
- Coordinates: 14°16′26″N 120°44′06″E
- Country: Philippines
- Region: Calabarzon
- Province: Cavite
- District: 8th district
- Founded: 1611
- Barangays: 27 (see Barangays)

Government
  - Type: Sangguniang Bayan
  - Mayor: Lawrence N. Arca
  - Vice Mayor: Aldous S. Angeles
  - Representative: Aniela Bianca D. Tolentino
  - Municipal Council: Members: Lorenzo Miguel U. Arca; Irineo C. Angeles; Bonn B. Rillo; Emil P. Digal; Joel D. Angue; Alexander Alan S. Angeles; Joel A. Perio; Ehmil Reden C. Sena
  - Electorate: 33,872 voters (2025)

Area
  - Total: 164.61 km^{2} (63.56 sq mi)
- Elevation: 77 m (253 ft)
- Highest elevation: 1,409 m (4,623 ft)
- Lowest elevation: 0 m (0 ft)

Population (2024 census)
  - Total: 41,977
  - Density: 255.01/km^{2} (660.47/sq mi)
  - Households: 9,770

Economy
  - Income class: 2nd municipal income class
  - Poverty incidence: 15.34% (2023)
  - Revenue: ₱ 217.1 million (2024)
  - Assets: ₱ 665.8 million (2024)
  - Expenditure: ₱ 101.7 million (2024)
  - Liabilities: ₱ 86.37 million (2024)

Service provider
  - Electricity: Manila Electric Company (Meralco)
- Time zone: UTC+8 (PST)
- ZIP code: 4112
- PSGC: 0402113000
- IDD : area code: +63 (0)46
- Native languages: Tagalog
- Major religions: Roman Catholicism; Aglipayan Church; Protestantism
- Feast date: August 15
- Catholic diocese: Diocese of Imus
- Patron saint: Our Lady of Assumption
- Website: www.maragondon.gov.ph

Maragondon, officially the Municipality of Maragondon (Tagalog: Bayan ng Maragondon), is a municipality in the province of Cavite, Philippines. According to the 2024 census, it has a population of 41,977 people.

The town is famous for its bamboo crafts, Mounts Palay-Palay–Mataas-na-Gulod Protected Landscape which includes Mount Pico de Loro, and various ancestral houses and structures important to Philippine history and culture such as Maragondon Church and the execution site and trial house of national hero Andres Bonifacio.

== Etymology ==
The name "Maragondon" is a Spanish approximation of the Tagalog maragundóng or madagundóng ("having a rumbling or thunderous sound"). This referred to the noise coming from the Kay Albaran River in the village of Capantayan, which was the initial location for the town. However, due to the floods caused by the frequent overflowing of the river, the town was later moved to its present site.

== History ==
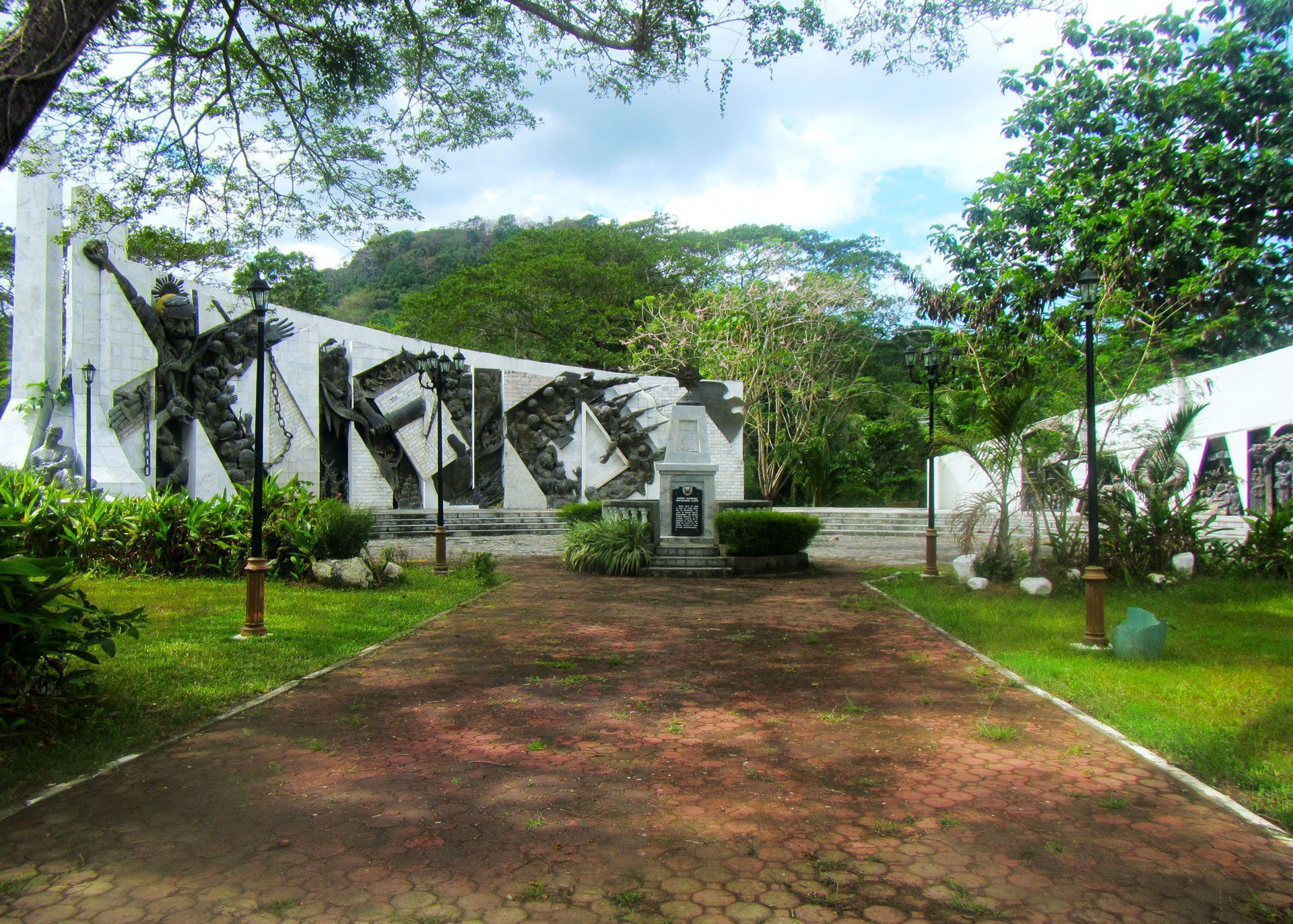
Bonifacio's monument at the foot of Mount Nagpatong and Mount Buntis in Maragondon, believed to be where he was executed with his brother upon orders of Emilio Aguinaldo on May 10, 1897.

Maragondon has three foundation dates, namely:

1. 1611 – When Franciscans from Silang established their first visita (sub-mission);
2. 1690 – The fundación ecclesiastica (founding of a regular parish) by the Jesuits, dedicated to Our Lady of the Assumption;
3. 1727 – The fundación civil, when the barrio of Maragondon was separated from Silang under the Recollects and converted into an independent municipality, with Gregorio Silvestre as the first gobernadorcillo.

Maragondon belonged to the corregimiento of Mariveles (now part of Bataan) until 1754, when Governor-General Pedro Manuel de Arandía abolished the politico-military administration and returned Maragondon to Cavite province. Alongside Silang, the town's territory was very large in its early decades.

In the second half of the 19th century, the towns of Ternate, Magallanes, Bailen, Alfonso, and Naic were barrios of Maragondon. Ternate was the first town separated on March 31, 1857, under an agreement signed on behalf of the people of that town by Tomás de León, Félix Nigosa, Pablo de León, Florencio Niño Franco and Juan Ramos.

Bailen (now Gen. Emilio Aguinaldo) and Alfonso were separated from Maragondon in 1858, then Naic in 1869. Magallanes was the last village to be excised, founded on July 15, 1879 by an agreement signed by Crisóstomo Riel representing Maragondon and by Isidro Bello and company representing Magallanes.

During the Philippine Revolution, on May 4, 1897, revolutionary leader Andres Bonifacio and his brother Procopio Bonifacio were court-martialled and sentenced to death convened in the house of prominent resident, Teodorico Reyes, following the brothers' arrest for defying the authority of Emilio Aguinaldo. They were then held at Maragondon Church until May 10, 1897, when they were executed somewhere in the Maragondon mountain range.

Amid political violence in Cavite, the town's mayor, Severino Rillo, was assassinated on September 2, 1952, along with the town's police chief and several police officers in the Maragondon Massacre. The killings were committed by gangster Leonardo Manecio, better known as "Nardong Putik", upon orders from local politicians.

== Geography ==
Maragondon is 44 kilometers (27 mi) from Imus, the provincial capital, and 54 kilometers (34 mi) from Manila, the national capital.

=== Barangays ===
Maragondon is politically subdivided into 27 barangays, as indicated below. Each barangay consists of puroks and some have sitios.

- Bucal 1
- Bucal 2
- Bucal 3A
- Bucal 3B
- Bucal 4A
- Bucal 4B
- Caingin Pob.
- Garita 1A
- Garita 1B
- Layong Mabilog
- Mabato
- Pantihan 1 (Balayungan)
- Pantihan 2
- Pantihan 3 (Pook na Munti)
- Pantihan 4 (Pulo ni Sara)
- Patungan
- Pinagsanhan A (Ibayo)
- Pinagsanhan B (Ibayo)
- Poblacion 1A
- Poblacion 1B
- Poblacion 2A
- Poblacion 2B
- San Miguel A (Caputatan)
- San Miguel B (Caputatan)
- Talipusngo
- Tulay Silangan (Mabacao)
- Tulay Kanluran (Mabacao)

=== Climate ===
Climate data for Maragondon, Cavite
Month	Jan	Feb	Mar	Apr	May	Jun	Jul	Aug	Sep	Oct	Nov	Dec	Year
Mean daily maximum °C (°F)	29 (84)	30 (86)	32 (90)	34 (93)	32 (90)	31 (88)	29 (84)	29 (84)	29 (84)	30 (86)	30 (86)	29 (84)	30 (87)
Mean daily minimum °C (°F)	20 (68)	20 (68)	21 (70)	22 (72)	24 (75)	24 (75)	24 (75)	24 (75)	24 (75)	23 (73)	22 (72)	21 (70)	22 (72)
Average precipitation mm (inches)	10 (0.4)	10 (0.4)	12 (0.5)	27 (1.1)	94 (3.7)	153 (6.0)	206 (8.1)	190 (7.5)	179 (7.0)	120 (4.7)	54 (2.1)	39 (1.5)	1,094 (43)
Average rainy days	5.2	4.5	6.4	9.2	19.7	24.3	26.9	25.7	24.4	21.0	12.9	9.1	189.3
Source: Meteoblue

== Demographics ==
Population census of Maragondon
Year	Pop.	±% p.a.
1903	7,191	—
1918	7,266	+0.07%
1939	9,449	+1.26%
1948	8,465	−1.21%
1960	9,994	+1.39%
1970	12,743	+2.46%
1975	14,785	+3.03%
1980	18,018	+4.03%
1990	22,814	+2.39%
1995	25,828	+2.35%
2000	31,227	+4.15%
2007	33,604	+1.02%
2010	35,289	+1.80%
2015	37,720	+1.28%
2020	40,687	+1.61%
2024	41,977	+0.75%
Source: Philippine Statistics Authority

In the 2024 census, the population of Maragondon was 41,977 people, with a density of 260 inhabitants per square kilometer or 670 inhabitants per square mile.

== Economy ==
Poverty incidence of Maragondon (%)

Source: Philippine Statistics Authority

== Government ==
=== Elected officials ===
The following are the elected officials of the town elected last May 12, 2025 which serves until 2028:

Position	Official
Mayor	Lawrence N. Arca (NPC)
Vice Mayor	Aldous S. Angeles (NUP)

Sangguniang Bayan Members	Party
Lorenzo Miguel U. Arca	NPC
Irineo C. Angeles	NPC
Bonn B. Rillo	NPC
Emil P. Digal	NPC
Joel D. Angue	NPC
Alexander Alan S. Angeles	Independent
Joel A. Perio	NPC
Ehmil Reden C. Sena	NPC
ABC President
Ciriaco Angeles
SK Federation President
Jan Robby Tañagras

== Education ==
The Maragondon Schools District Office governs all educational institutions within the municipality. It oversees the management and operations of all private and public, from primary to secondary schools.

=== Primary and elementary school ===
- Balayungan Elementary School
- Bucal I Elementary School
- Bucal II Elementary School
- Layong Mabilog Elementary School
- Living Word Christian School
- Mabato Elementary School
- Maragondon Elementary School
- Maragondon Parochial School
- Marcelo D. Samaniego Elementary School
- Pantihan II Elementary School
- Pantihan III Elementary School
- Pinagsanhan Elementary School
- Pulo ni Sara Elementary School
- San Miguel Elementary School
- Sta. Mercedes Elementary School
- Talipusngo Elementary School
- Tulay Elementary School

=== Secondary schools ===
- Bucal National Integrated School
- Bucal National High School - Sta. Mercedes Annex
- Cavite Science Integrated School
- Cavite State University - Maragondon Campus Laboratory Science High School
- Maragondon National Integrated School
- Pulo ni Sara Integrated School

=== Higher educational institution ===
- Polytechnic University of the Philippines Maragondon

== Notable people ==
- Emiliano Riego de Dios - Capitan Municipal of Maragondon and General of the Philippine Revolution
- Mariano Riego de Dios - General of the Philippine Revolution
- Vicente Riego de Dios - Colonel of the Philippine Revolution
- Simon Camacho - Basketball Player
- Estanislao Martin de Angeles - Gobernadorcillo of Maragondon (1860) and clerk of court of Binondo, Manila

== Images ==
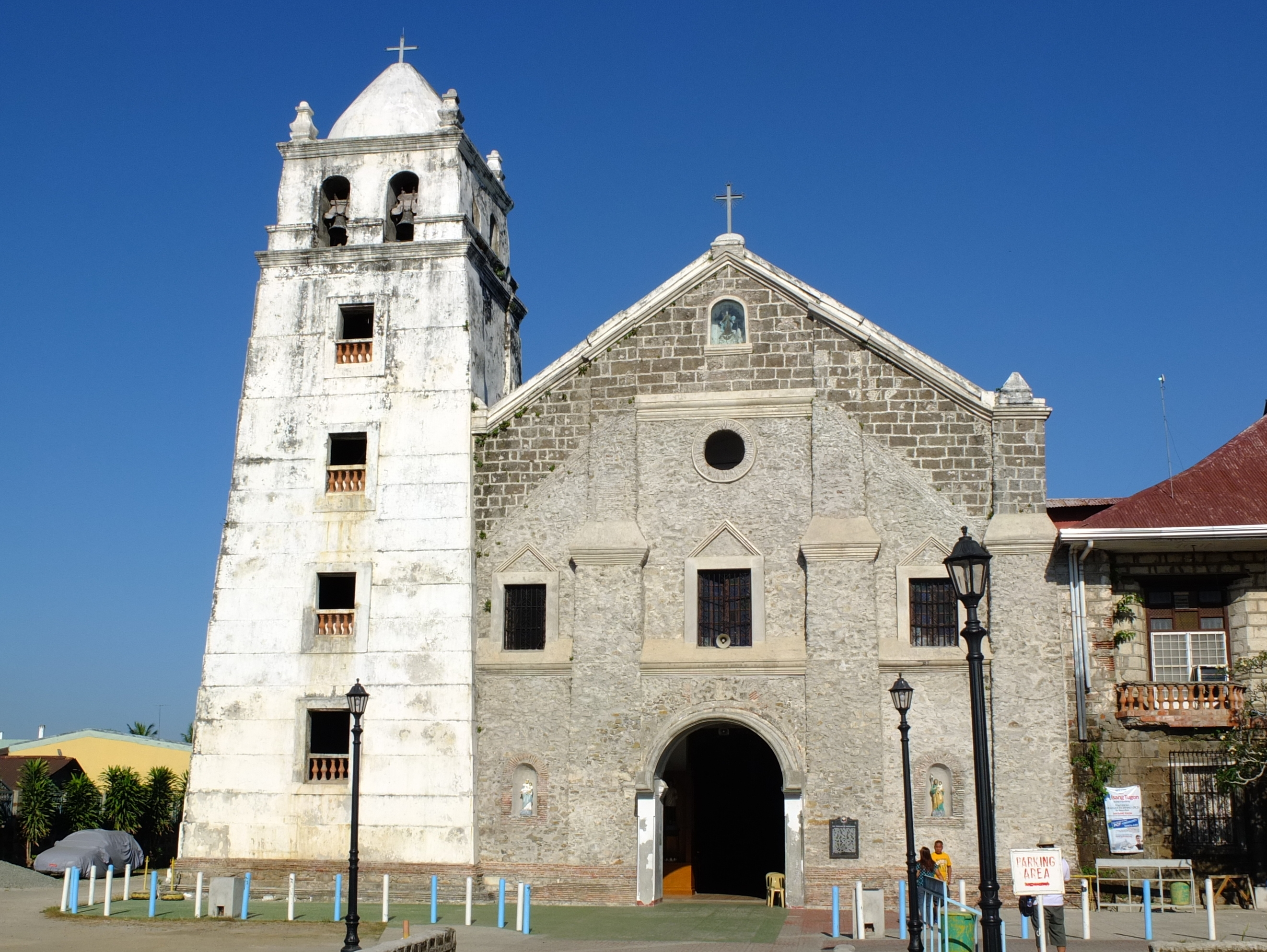
Our Lady of the Assumption, Maragondon

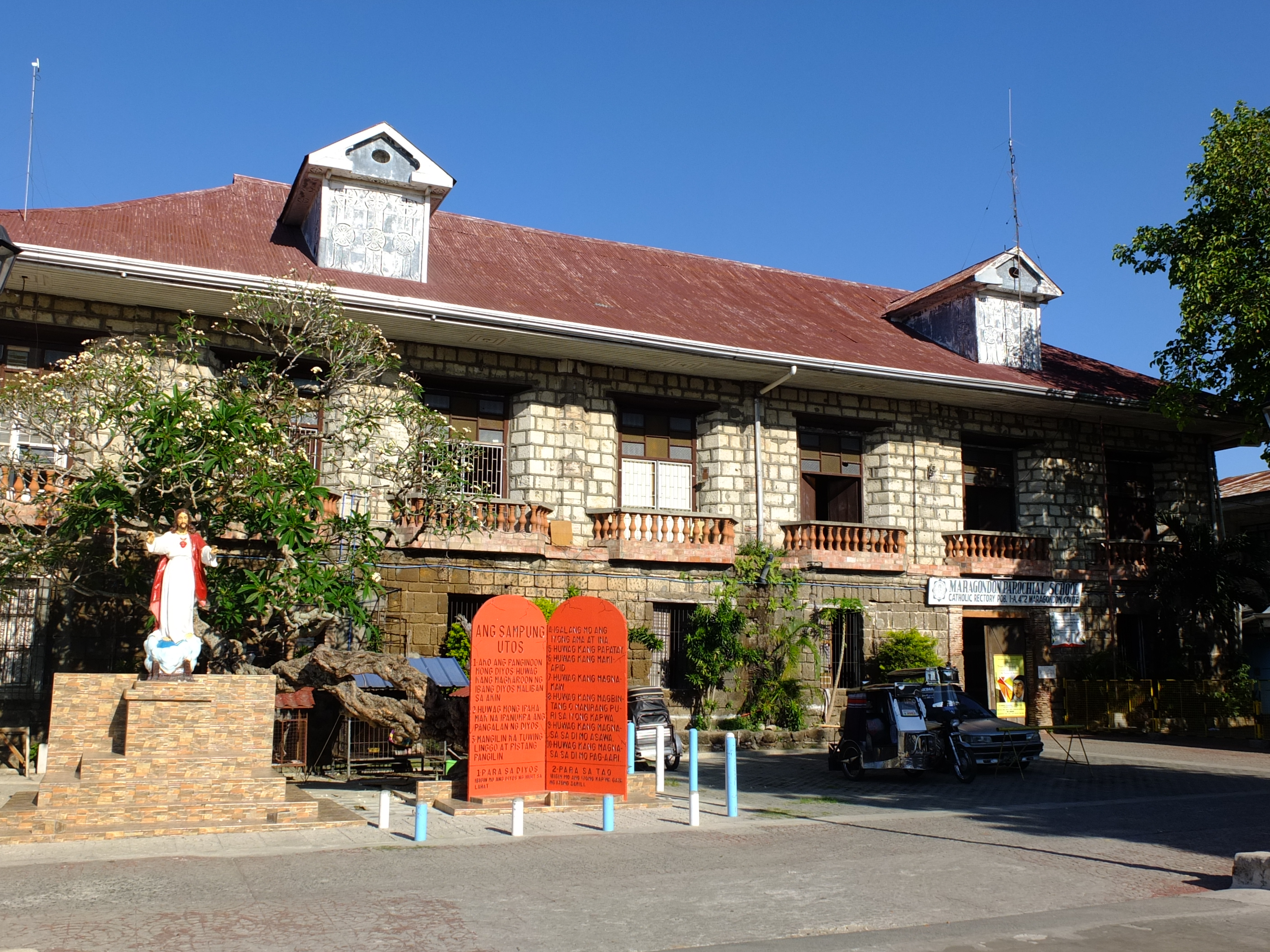
Maragondon Parochial School

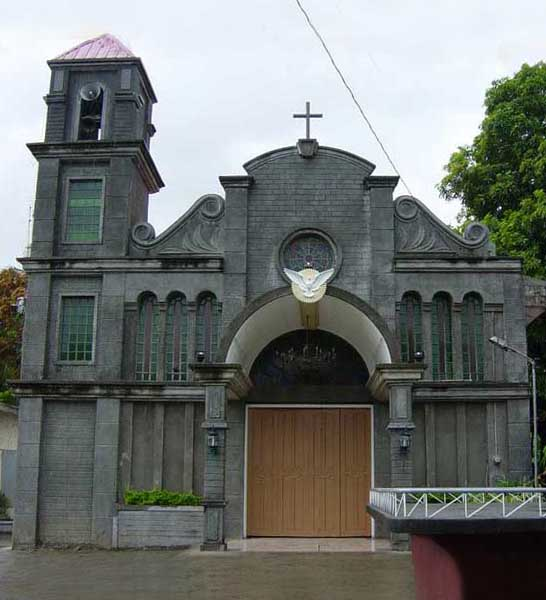
Iglesia Filipina Independiente (Aglipayan) Parish of the Virgin of the Assumption in Maragondon, Cavite.

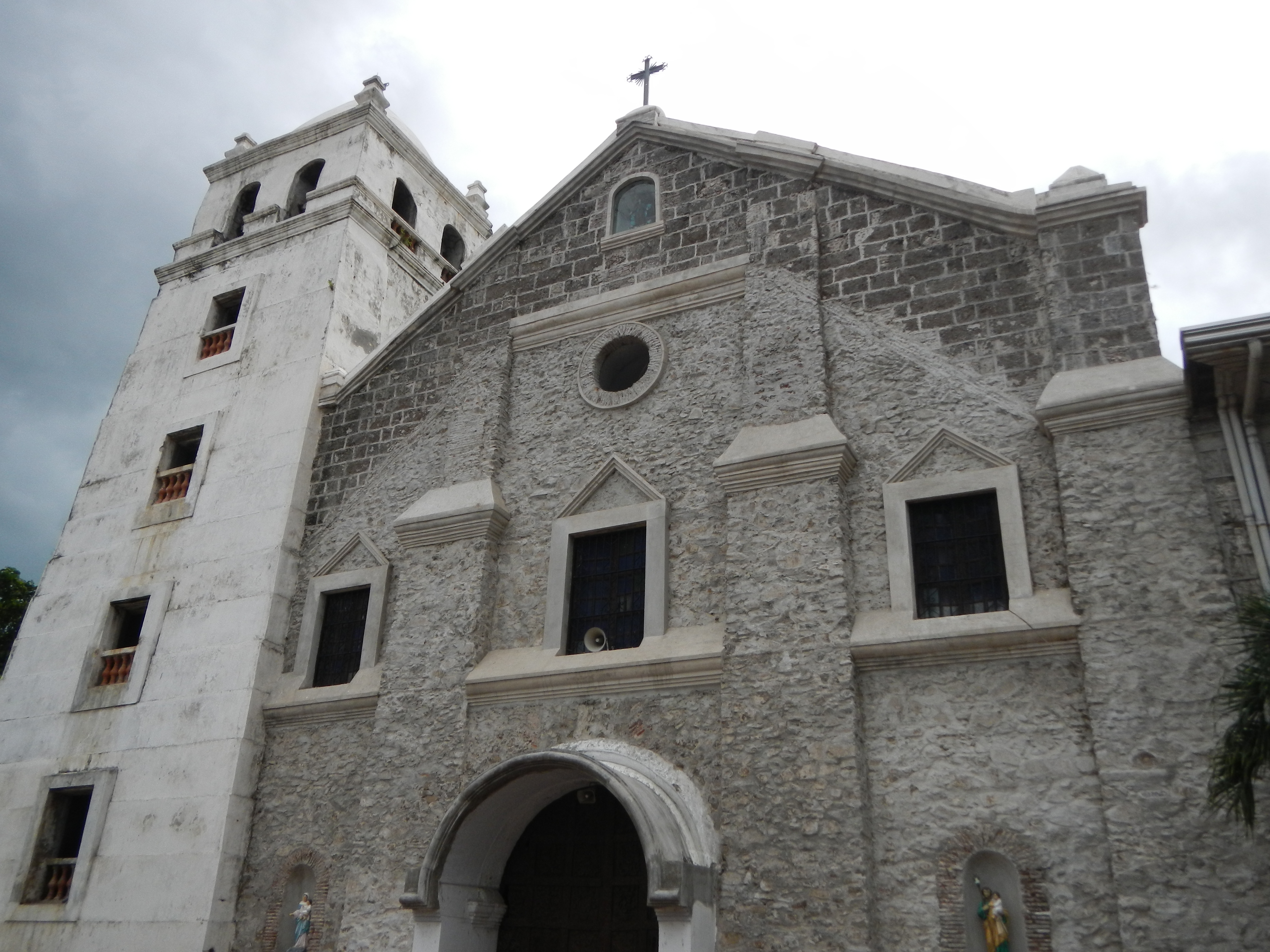
Our Lady of the Assumption Parish Church

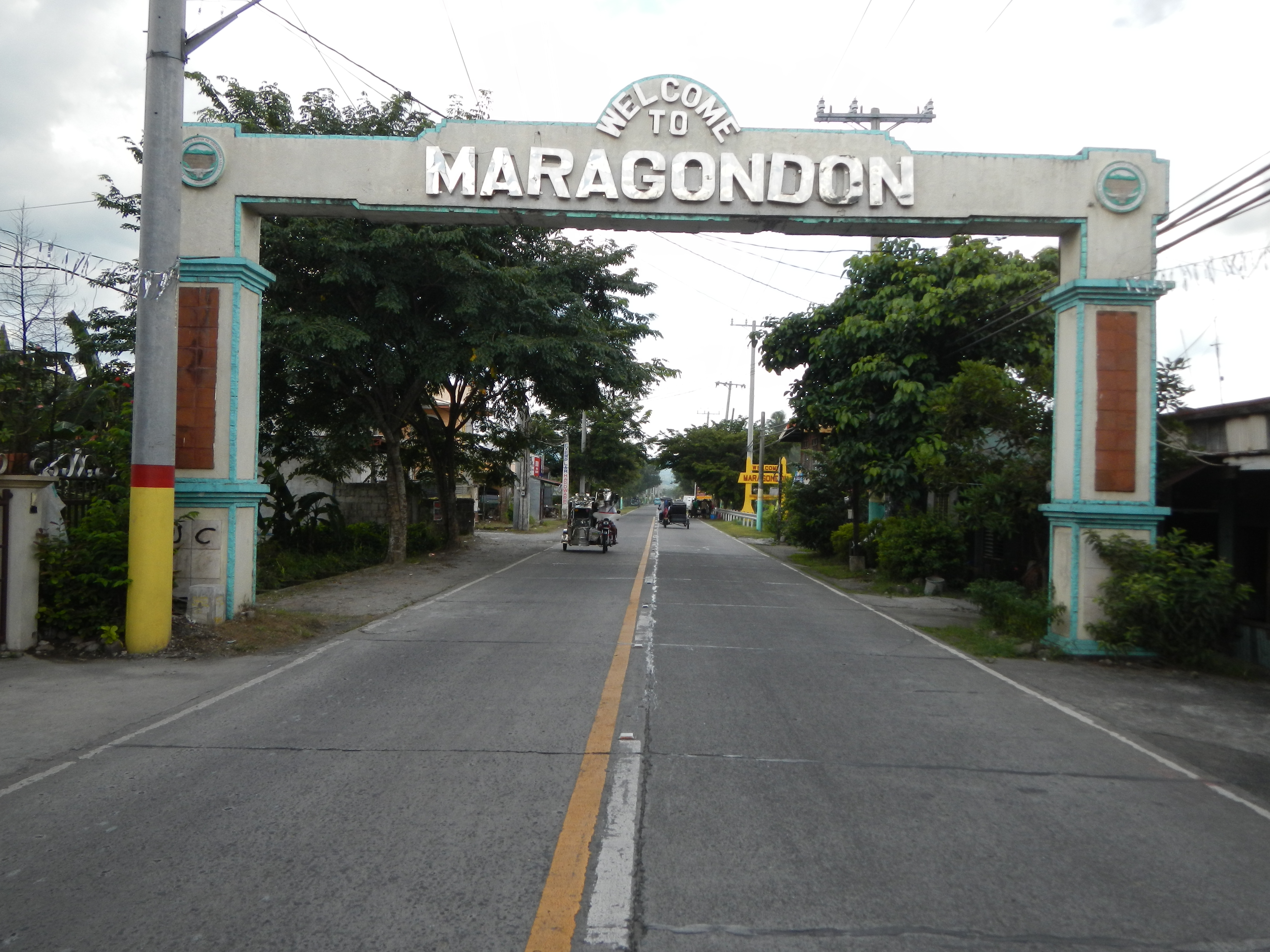
Welcome arch

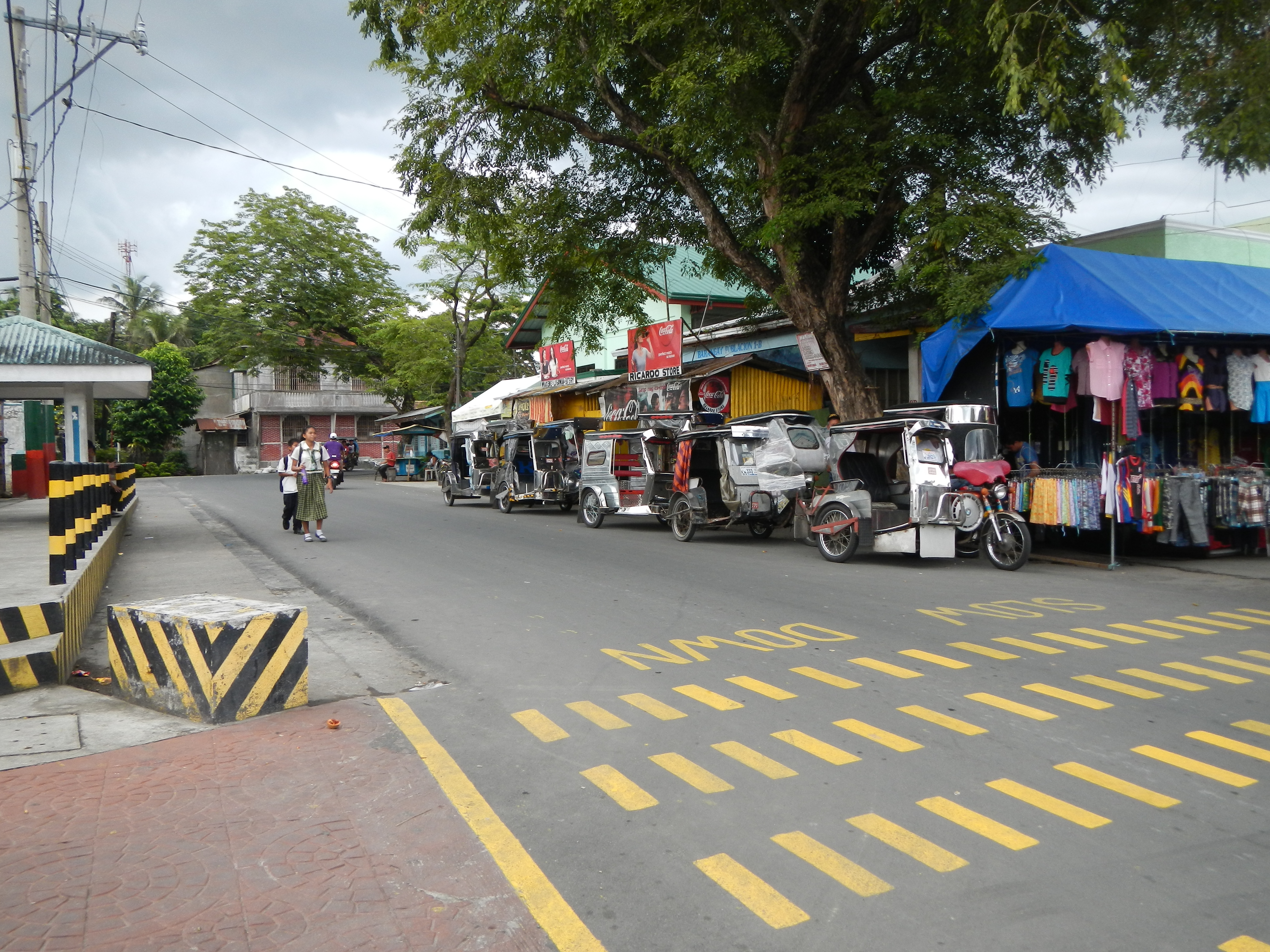
Barangay Poblacion 1-B

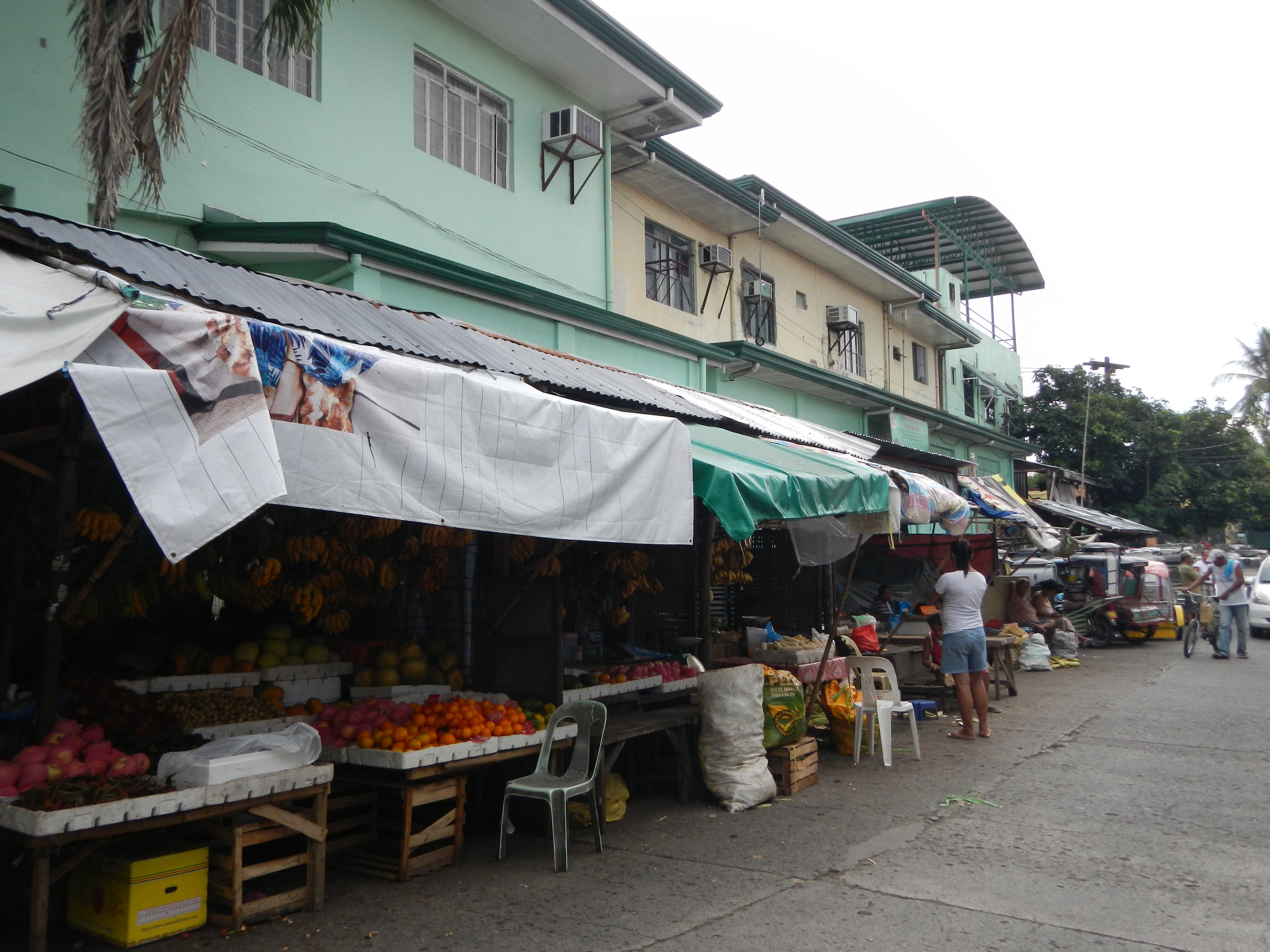
Public market

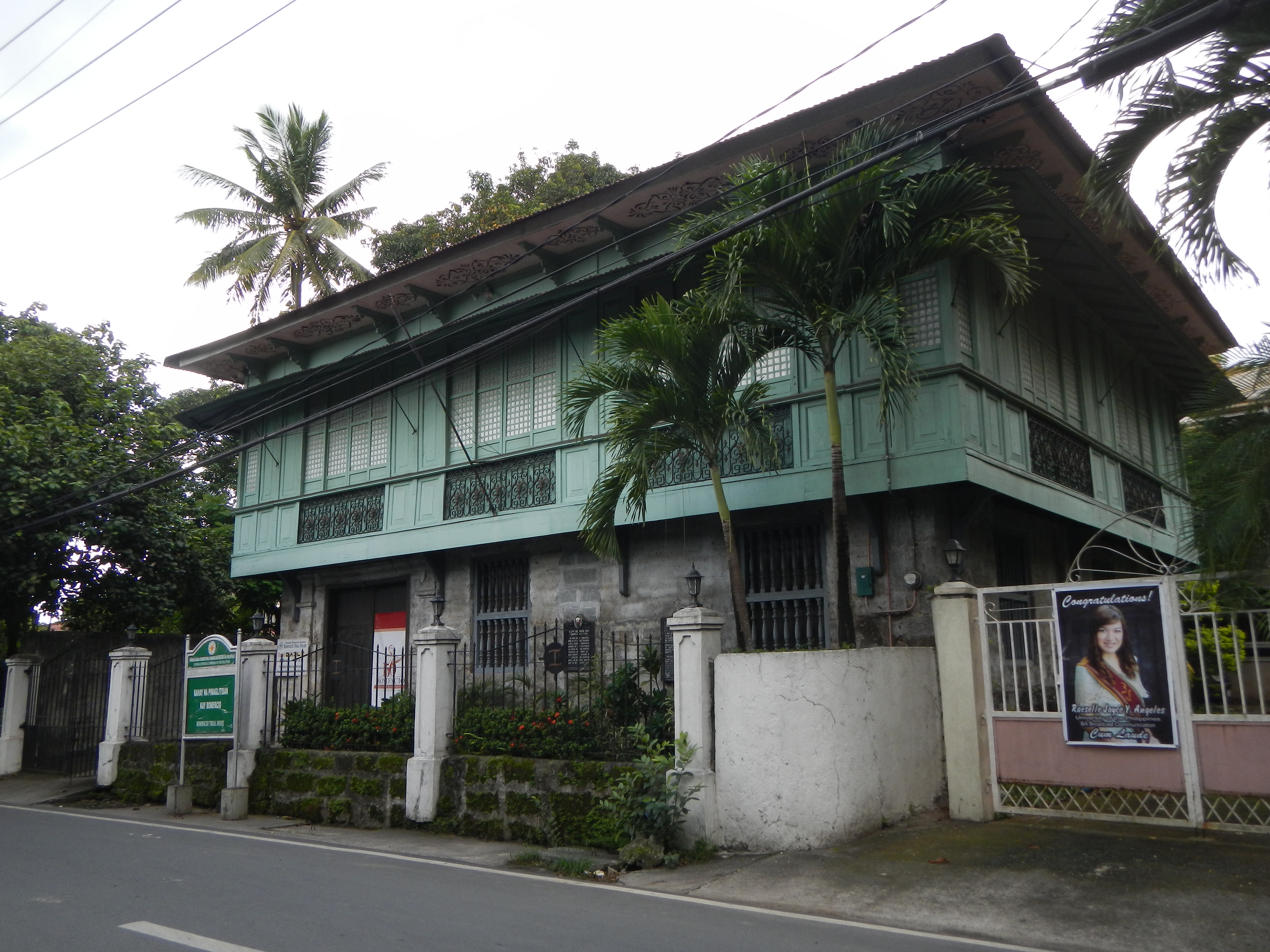
Bonifacio Trial House

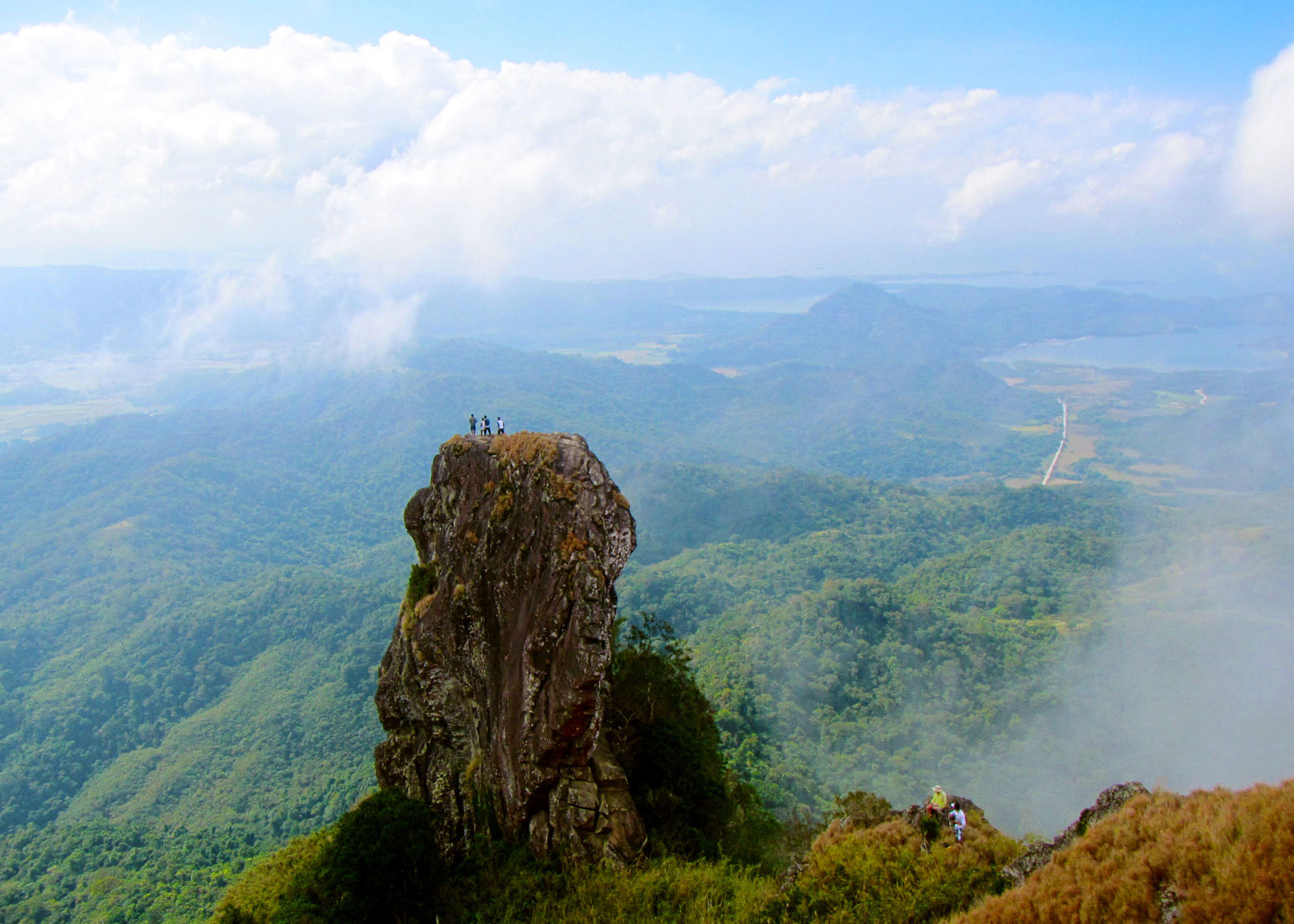
Mt. Pico De Loro Monolith

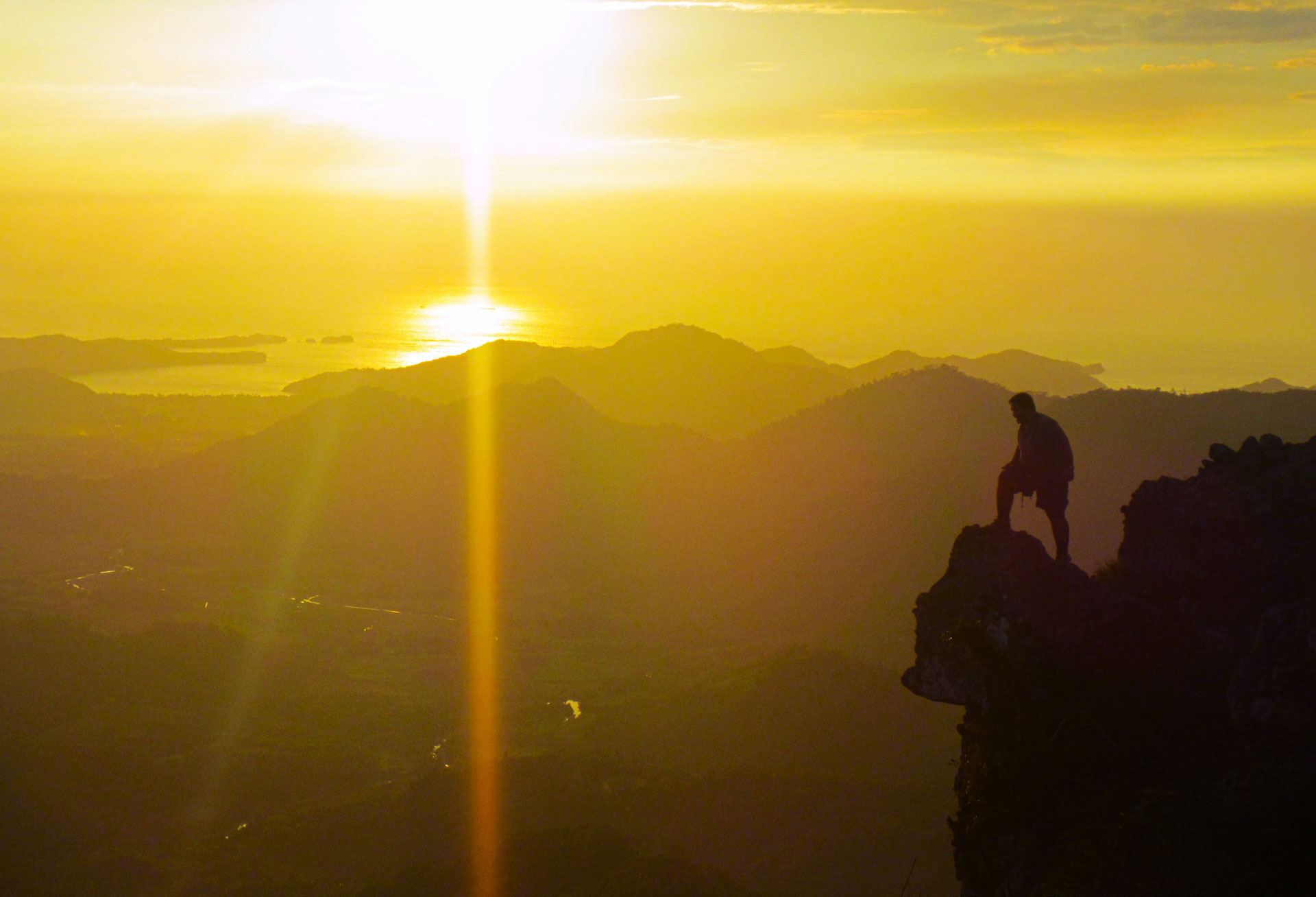
Silyang Bato of Mt. Marami

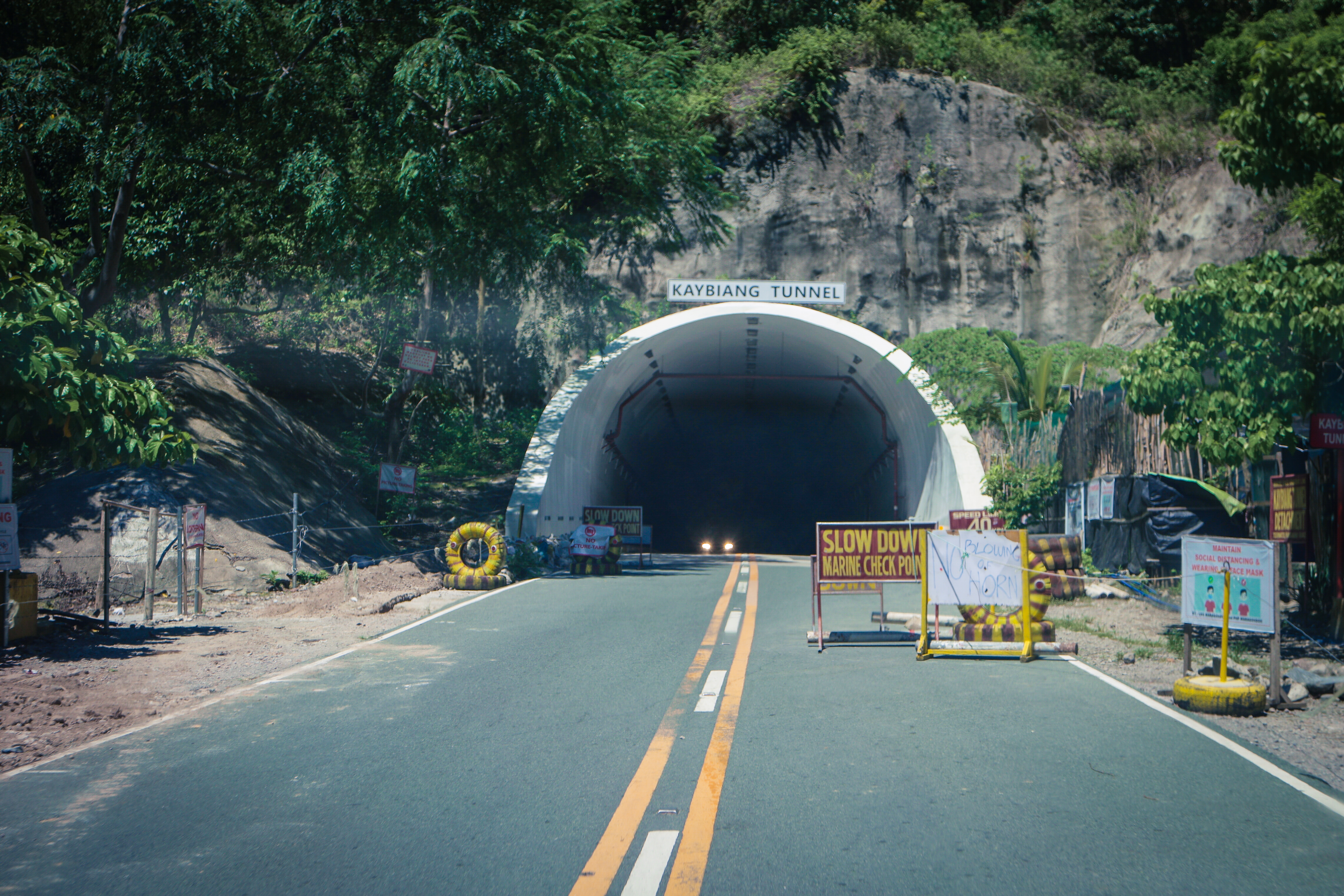
Kaybiang Tunnel

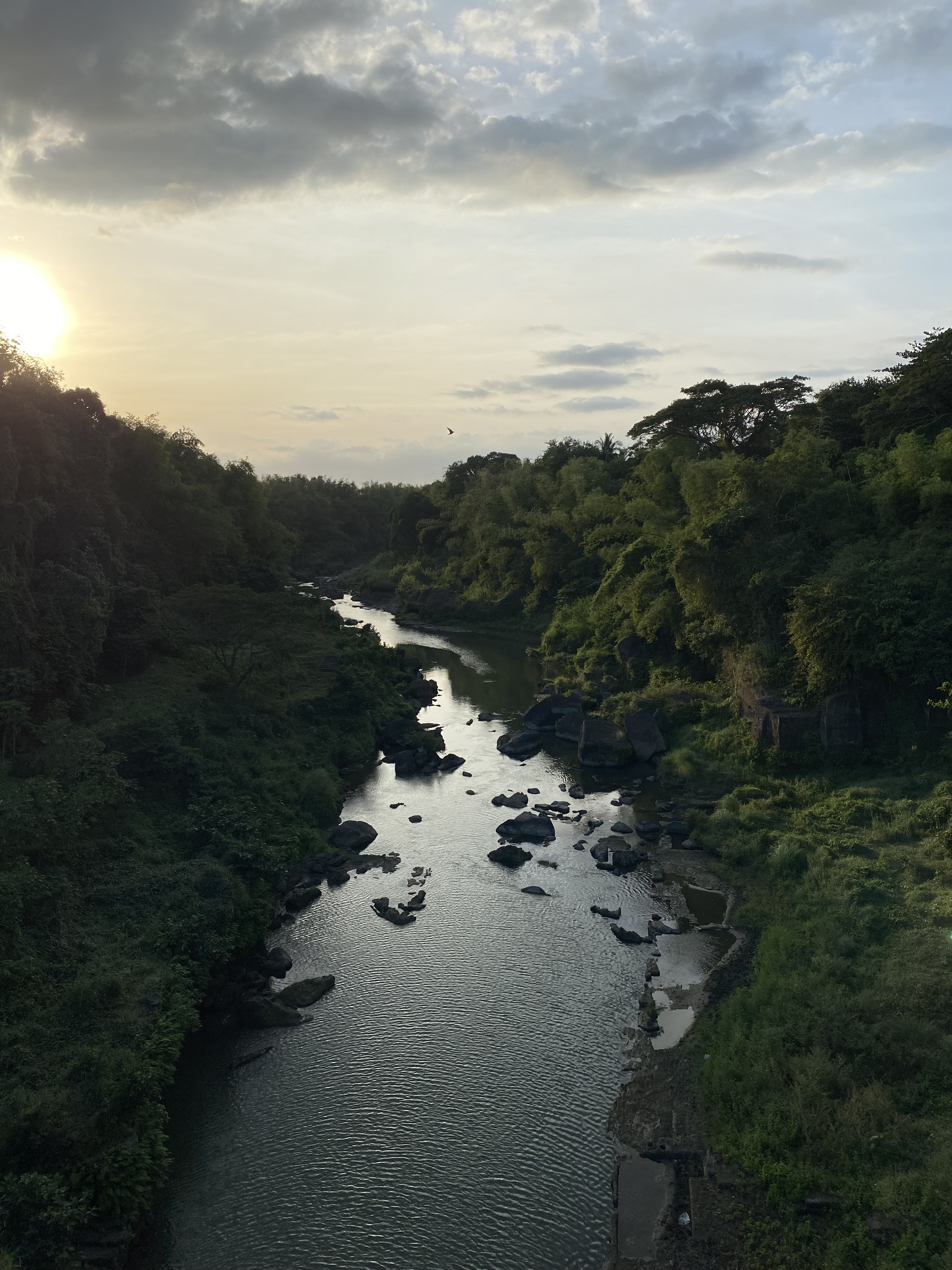
Maragondon River at dusk
