= Louis J. Van Schaick =

US Army officer (1875-1945)

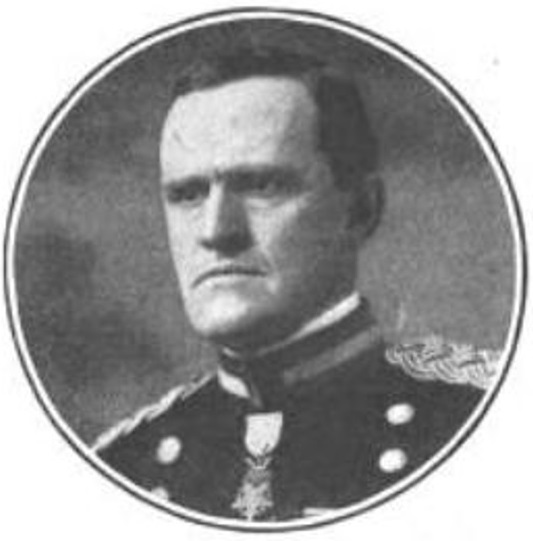
- Born: Louis Joseph Van Schaick; July 1, 1875; Cobleskill, New York, U.S.
- Died: February 14, 1945 (aged 69); Baguio, Philippines
- Spouse: Nellie Mae Van Schaick
- Relatives: John van Schaick Jr. (brother); John Van Schaick (father)
- Military career
- Allegiance: United States of America
- Branch: United States Army
- Service years: 1899–1934
- Rank: Colonel
- Unit: 4th U.S. Infantry
- Conflicts: Philippine–American War; Border War; World War I
- Awards: Medal of Honor; Purple Heart

Louis Joseph Van Schaick (July 1, 1875 – February 14, 1945) was an officer in the United States Army and the Medal of Honor recipient for his actions in the Philippine–American War.

== Biography ==
Van Schaick was born on July 1, 1875, in Cobleskill, New York, to John Van Schaick and the former Frances Elizabeth Shaver. Among his siblings was John van Schaick Jr., who later married Julia Asenath Romaine (a daughter of Benjamin F. Romaine of New York City).

Van Schaick attended West Point as a member of the 1900 class but left one year before graduating to join the army. While serving in the Philippines, he held the governorships of Cavite (1905–1907) and Mindoro (1908–1912). In 1906, he assisted Colonel Harry Hill Bandholtz in carrying out the capture of the notorious Filipino bandit leader, Macario Sakay.

He later went on to fight with General John J. Pershing in pursuit of Pancho Villa and (as a lieutenant colonel) was part of the 1st expeditionary force sent to France, again with General Pershing. He was retired for disability in August 1934 with the rank of colonel.

He was later imprisoned during the Japanese occupation of the Philippines and died shortly after his release on February 14, 1945. He was buried at Manila American Cemetery and Memorial.

== Medal of Honor citation ==
Rank and organization: First Lieutenant, 4th U.S. Infantry. Place and date: Near Nasugbu, Batangas, Philippine Islands, November 23, 1901. Entered service at: Cobleskill, N.Y. Birth: Cobleskill, N.Y. G.O. No.: 33, 1913. Date of issue: Unknown.

=== Citation ===
While in pursuit of a band of insurgents was the first of his detachment to emerge from a canyon, and seeing a column of insurgents and fearing they might turn and dispatch his men as they emerged one by one from the canyon, galloped forward and closed with the insurgents, thereby throwing them into confusion until the arrival of others of the detachment.

== See also ==
- List of Medal of Honor recipients
- List of Philippine–American War Medal of Honor recipients
