= Milton Terry =

American theologian and minister (1840-1914)

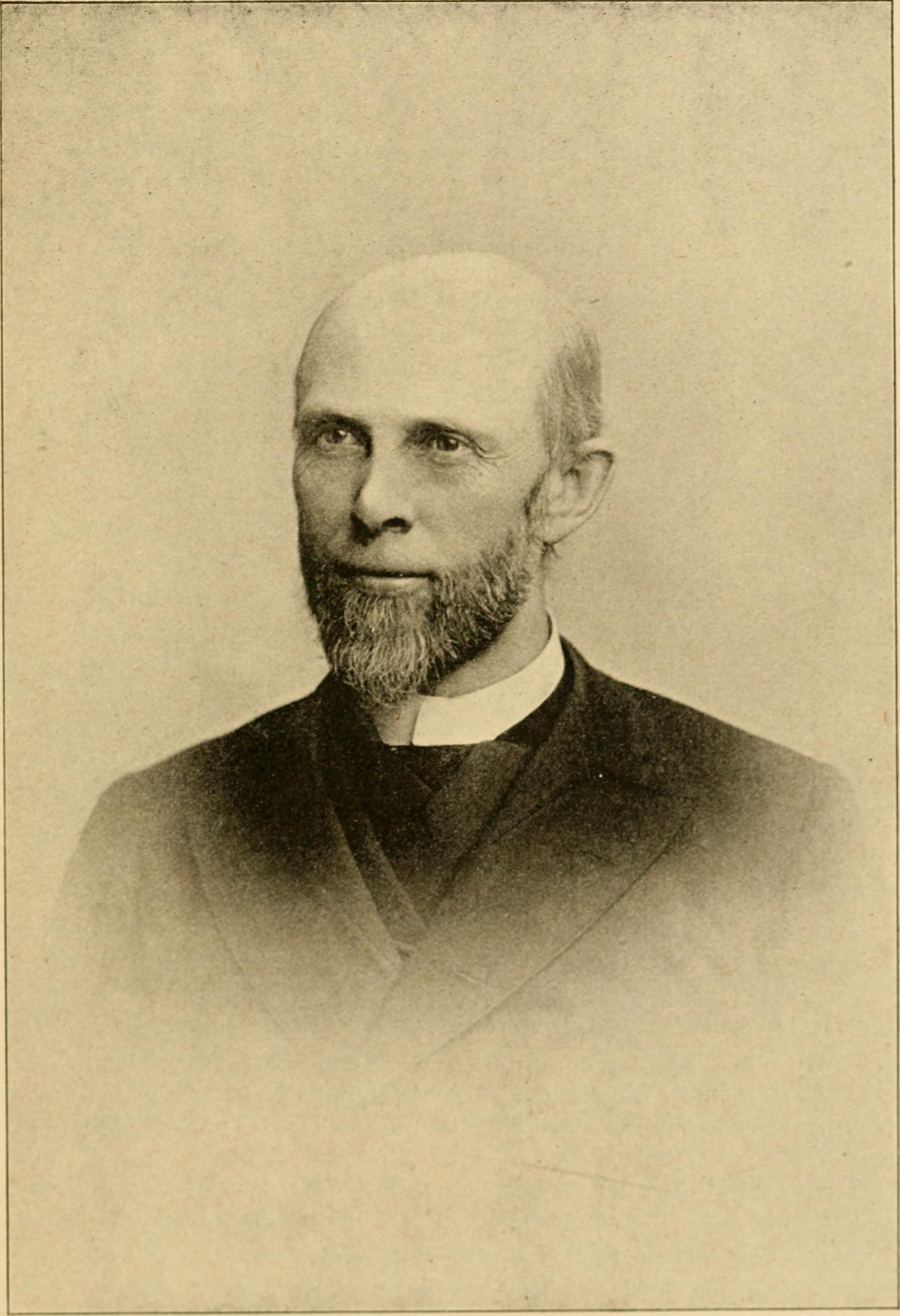
Milton Terry in 1891

Milton Spenser Terry (February 22, 1840 – July 13, 1914) was an American theologian and minister.

Terry was born in Coeymans, New York and was educated at the New York Conference Seminary in Charlotteville, New York and Yale Divinity School. He served as a minister in the Methodist Episcopal Church from 1863 to 1884 before he became Professor of Old Testament Language and Literature at Garrett Biblical Institute. He became Professor of Christian Doctrine in 1897, and stayed in that position until his death in 1914.

Terry was a prolific writer, and wrote commentaries on Genesis, Exodus, Joshua, Daniel, and Revelation. He also wrote a book on Shintoism and translated the Sibylline Oracles. His magnum opus was a trilogy consisting of Biblical Hermeneutics (1883), Biblical Apocalyptics (1898), and Biblical Dogmatics (1907). Robert L. Thomas suggests that Biblical Hermeneutics was "viewed as the standard work on biblical hermeneutics for most of the twentieth century."

Terry was an advocate of postmillennialism and preterism.
