= Charlotteville Seminary =

Coordinates: 42.5452°N 74.6647°W

The New York Conference Seminary in Charlotteville, Schoharie County, New York, also known as Charlotteville Seminary, was a school operated under the auspices of the New York Conference of the Methodist Episcopal Church. It was founded in 1850 with Alonzo Flack as the principal.

One of the school buildings was destroyed by fire in 1856, but the school continued through the purchase and renovation of a hotel. It finally closed in 1875.

== Notable alumni ==
- John Emory Andrus
- Frederick J. Bancroft
- Owen Vincent Coffin
- Henry C. Connelly
- Alonzo B. Coons
- Lorenzo Crounse
- Mary Gage Day
- Lansing Hotaling
- Joshua S. Salmon
- Milton Terry
- John Van Schaick
- Lewis Waterman
