= John Van Schaick =

American politician

Member of the New York State Senate
- In office January 1, 1884 – December 31, 1885
- Preceded by: Addison P. Jones
- Succeeded by: Henry C. Connelly

Personal details
- Born: July 28, 1840 Sharon, New York, U.S.
- Died: June 9, 1923 (aged 82) Cobleskill, New York, U.S.
- Party: Democratic
- Spouse: Frances Elizabeth Shaver (m. 1871; died 1923)
- Children: 6, including John, Louis
- Parent(s): Joseph Wilson Van Schaick; Elizabeth Slingerland Van Schaick
- Education: Williston Seminary
- Alma mater: Williams College; Albany Law School

John Van Schaick (July 28, 1840 – June 9, 1923) was an American lawyer and politician from Schoharie County, New York.

== Early life ==
Van Schaick was born on July 28, 1840, in Sharon in Schoharie County, New York. He was a son of Joseph Wilson Van Schaick (1804–1880) and Elizabeth (née Slingerland) Van Schaick (1808–1890). His siblings included Koert VanSchaick, Elizabeth (née Van Schaick) Hutton, Mary Van Schaick, Catherine Van Schaick, Slingerland Van Schaick, Sarah Van Schaick and Emily Van Schaick.

He attended Charlotteville Seminary (in his native Schoharie County) and Williston Seminary in Massachusetts before attending Williams College which he left to attend Albany Law School where he graduated in 1864.

== Career ==
Van Schaick worked as a teacher, a School Commissioner, and had a law office in Cobleskill where he was known as the "Nestor of the Schoharie County Bar". In 1883, he was elected to the New York State Senate and began serving on January 1, 1884, in the 107th New York State Legislature replacing fellow Democrat Addison P. Jones. He served through the 108th Legislature until December 31, 1885, when he was replaced by Henry C. Connelly.

== Personal life ==
On May 25, 1871, Van Shaick was married to Frances Elizabeth Shaver (1851–1923), who was born at Hyndsville and was the daughter of Charles H. Shaver and Salina (née Hynds) Shaver, a descendant of the prominent Schuyler family of Albany. Together, they were the parents of:

- Charles Shaver Van Schaick (1872–1928), who worked for the Mercantile Agency.
- John Van Schaick Jr. (1873–1949), a prominent minister of the Universalist National Memorial Church who married Julia Asenath Romaine (a daughter of Benjamin F. Romaine of New York City).
- Louis Joseph Van Schaick (1875–1945), an officer in the U.S. Army who received the Medal of Honor for his actions in the Philippine–American War. Later during World War II, Col. Van Schaick was taken prisoner by the Japanese. Although he was released, he died in the Philippine Islands. He married Nellie Mae Kellogg, niece of Will Keith Kellogg, founder of the Kellogg Company.
- Jessie Van Schaick (1877–1962), who married Arden Lathrop Norton.
- George Slingerland Van Schaick (1883–1968), an attorney who married Blanche LeFevre, a graduate of Vassar College who was a founder and former president of the League of Women Voters.
- Francis Van Schaick (1892–1946), who married Katherine Mallette Hardwick in 1916.

He also served as secretary of the Schoharie County Anti-Horse Thief Society, president of the Cobleskill Agricultural Society, member of Holland Society of New York. He was the first Sachem of the Improved Order of Red Men in Cobleskill and was a Mason.

Van Shaick died on June 9, 1923, in Cobleskill, also in Schoharie County, New York. His widow died a few months later in August 1923.

New York State Senate
Preceded by Addison P. Jones	New York State Senate; 14th District; 1884–1885	Succeeded by Henry C. Connelly
