= Henry C. Connelly =

American politician

Henry Cantine Connelly (September 25, 1832 in Phoenicia, Ulster County, New York – October 8, 1912 in Kingston, Ulster County, New York) was an American merchant, manufacturer, banker and politician from New York.

== Life ==
He was the son of William Connelly (1807–1890) and Margaret Ann (Terpenning) Connelly (1810–1882). The family removed to Esopus when Henry was still an infant. He attended the common schools, and for one year Charlotteville Seminary in Summit. Then he became a clerk in a store owned by his father and a cousin of his in Rondout. On April 12, 1854, he married Cornelia A. Aldrich (died 1857). In 1856, he became a partner in the store, and later engaged extensively in the manufacture of Rosendale cement. In 1858, he married Lucinda Manning, and they had nine children. He was also President of the Kingston Savings Bank and the Kingston National Bank.

He was Supervisor of the Town of Esopus from 1867 to 1870, and a member of the New York State Senate (14th D.) in 1874 and 1875; and again in 1886 and 1887.

Chief Justice Charles Evans Hughes was his nephew.

== Sources ==
- Life Sketches of Government Officers and Members of the Legislature of the State of New York in 1875 by W. H. McElroy and Alexander McBride (pg. 51f) [e-book]
- Ex-State Senator H. C. Connelly in NYT on October 10, 1912
- The History of Ulster County by Alphonso T. Clearwater (1907; Vol. 2; pg. 576; re-published 2007)

New York State Senate
Preceded by William F. Scoresby	New York State Senate; 14th District; 1874–1875	Succeeded by Augustus Schoonmaker, Jr.
Preceded by John Van Schaick	New York State Senate; 14th District; 1886–1887	Succeeded by John J. Linson
