= Central Azucarera Don Pedro =

Sugar company based in the Philippines

- Founded: 1927; 98 years ago in Nasugbu, Batangas, Philippine Islands
- Defunct: March 29, 2024; 17 months ago
- Headquarters: Makati, Philippines (Note: Office location; sugar mill location is situated in Nasugbu, Batangas)
- Products: Raw sugar; refined sugar
- Parent: Roxas Holdings Inc.

Central Azucarera Don Pedro Incorporated was a sugar company based in the Philippines. It was established in 1927 and closed in March 2024 after roughly 97 years of operations.

== History ==
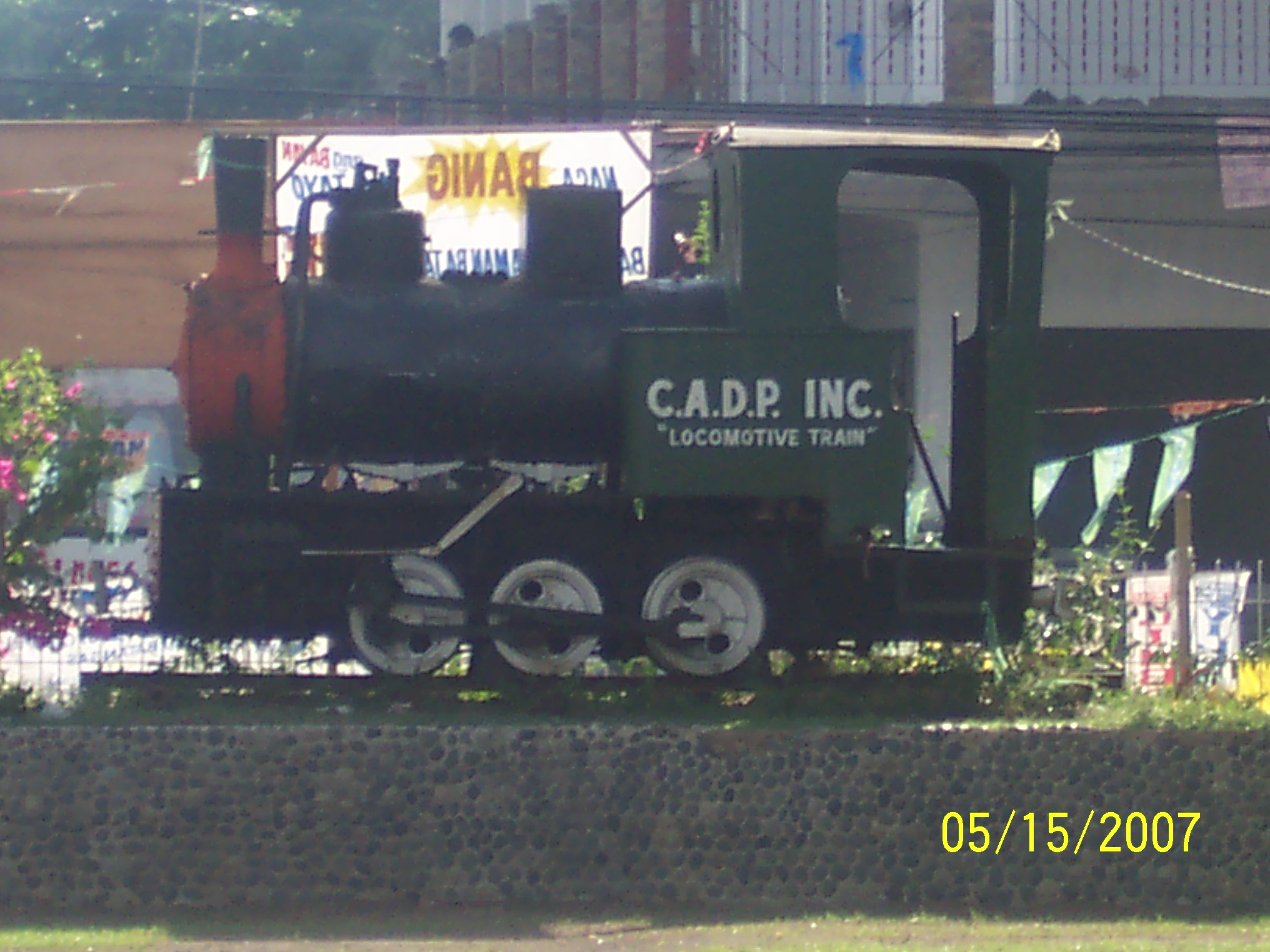
CADP Locomotive

Central Azucarera Don Pedro was established in 1927 during the American colonial era becoming, one of the first sugar milling companies in the Philippines. This was when the business' first sugar mill in Nasugbu, Batangas was built.

The sugar mill business would be incorporated three years later. A bigger sugar mill would be built, still in Nasugbu in 1950.

In the 2000s, CADPI's parent company Roxas Holdings Inc. was selected by the Sugar Regulatory Administration to oversee the government's modernization program of Luzon's sugar industry.

=== Closure ===
CADPI filed for permanent closure on December 15, 2022 starting the process of its disestablishment. This decision was met with protests urging the company to compensate workers who lost jobs and the government to intervene to reopen the mill instead of relying on sugar importation.

On February 28, 2024, due to huge losses affected by the national government's refined sugar importation in the past years, the company decided to cease business operations which became effective on March 29, 2024.

== Ownership ==
CADPI would become a subsidiary of the Roxas Holdings Inc. (RHI) at some point of its history. The First Pacific Company Limited of Hong Kong, co-established by Manny Pangilinan along with Anthoni Salim, acquired 34 percent of RHI in 2013. By 2015, it secured majority stake of RHI.

== Products and clients ==
CADPI sold raw and refined sugar, molasses, and other products. Among its clienteles were the Philippine chapters of multinational food and beverage companies such as Coca-Cola and Nestlé, as well as pharmaceutical companies such as Unilab.
