= Punta Fuego =

Flame-shaped headland on the island of Luzon in the Philippines

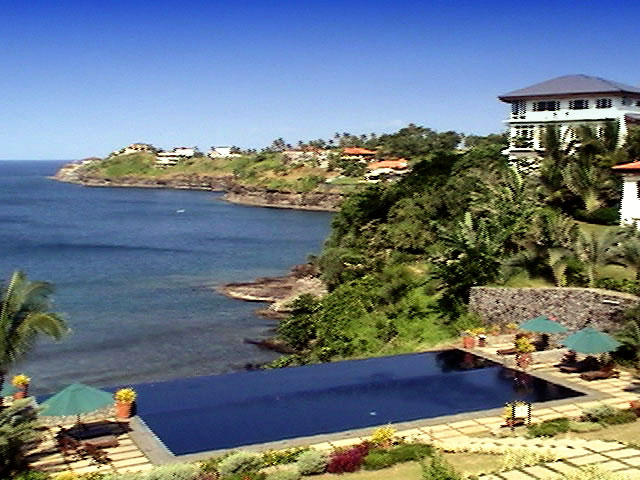
- Peninsula de Punta Fuego, a resort and beach community on Punta Fuego.

- Location within Philippines

Geography
- Coordinates: 14°7′58″N 120°35′13″E
- Area: 88 ha (220 acres)
- Highest elevation: 49 m (161 ft)

Administration
- Philippines
- Region: Calabarzon
- Province: Batangas
- Town: Nasugbu

Fuego Point, commonly known as Punta Fuego, is a flame-shaped headland located in western Batangas province on the island of Luzon in the Philippines. It extends as a 2.9 kilometres (1.8 mi) long promontory into the South China Sea overlooking Fortune Island and Nasugbu and Calayo bays in the municipality of Nasugbu. It is home to the exclusive Club Punta Fuego and Peninsula de Punta Fuego resort and seaside community.

== Geography ==
Punta Fuego is moderately high and rocky, with an islet off its north side. Two other islets, connected by a reef, lie southeast of the point and have a pinnacle rock, awash at low water, on their eastern side. The 88-hectare residential resort has several private beaches, a golf course, marina and a heliport developed in 1995 by Landco Pacific and Roxaco Land. The entire area is administered as part of the Nasugbu barangay of Balaytigue.

== History ==
Punta Fuego was the site of the Battle of San Diego between the Spanish and Dutch forces in the prelude to the Battles of La Naval de Manila in 1600. It is believed that the name of the place may have originated from this naval battle, when the early inhabitants heard the word Fuego! ("Fire!" in English), the command given by the Spanish naval vessel captain to fire cannons against the enemy.

== See also ==
- San Diego (ship)
