= Bute–Warner–Truax Farm =

- U.S. National Register of Historic Places
- U.S. Historic district
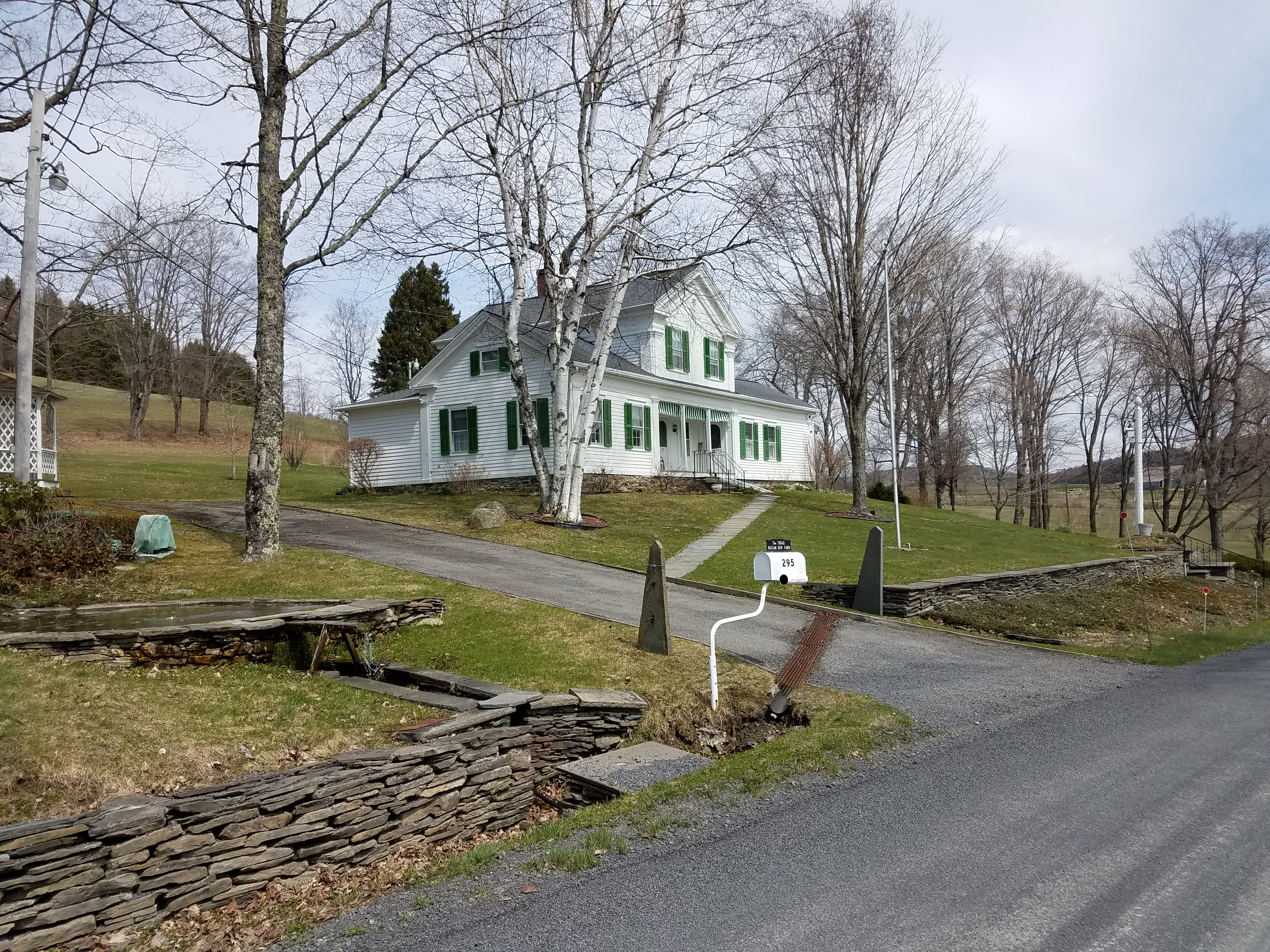
- Farmhouse at Blue-Warner-Truax Farm

- Location within New York Location within the United States
- Nearest city: Charlotteville, New York
- Coordinates: 42°34′22″N 74°39′29″W
- Area: 103 acres (42 ha)
- Built: 1853
- Architectural style: Greek Revival
- NRHP reference No.: 85001611
- Added to NRHP: July 25, 1985

Bute–Warner–Truax Farm is a historic farm complex and national historic district located at Charlotteville in Schoharie County, New York. The district includes three contributing buildings, one contributing site, and two contributing structures. It includes a Greek Revival style farmhouse built about 1853. Also included is a milk house (ca. 1910), auto garage (ca. 1920), fire pond (ca. 1920), and 19th-century family burial plot.

It was added to the National Register of Historic Places in 1985.

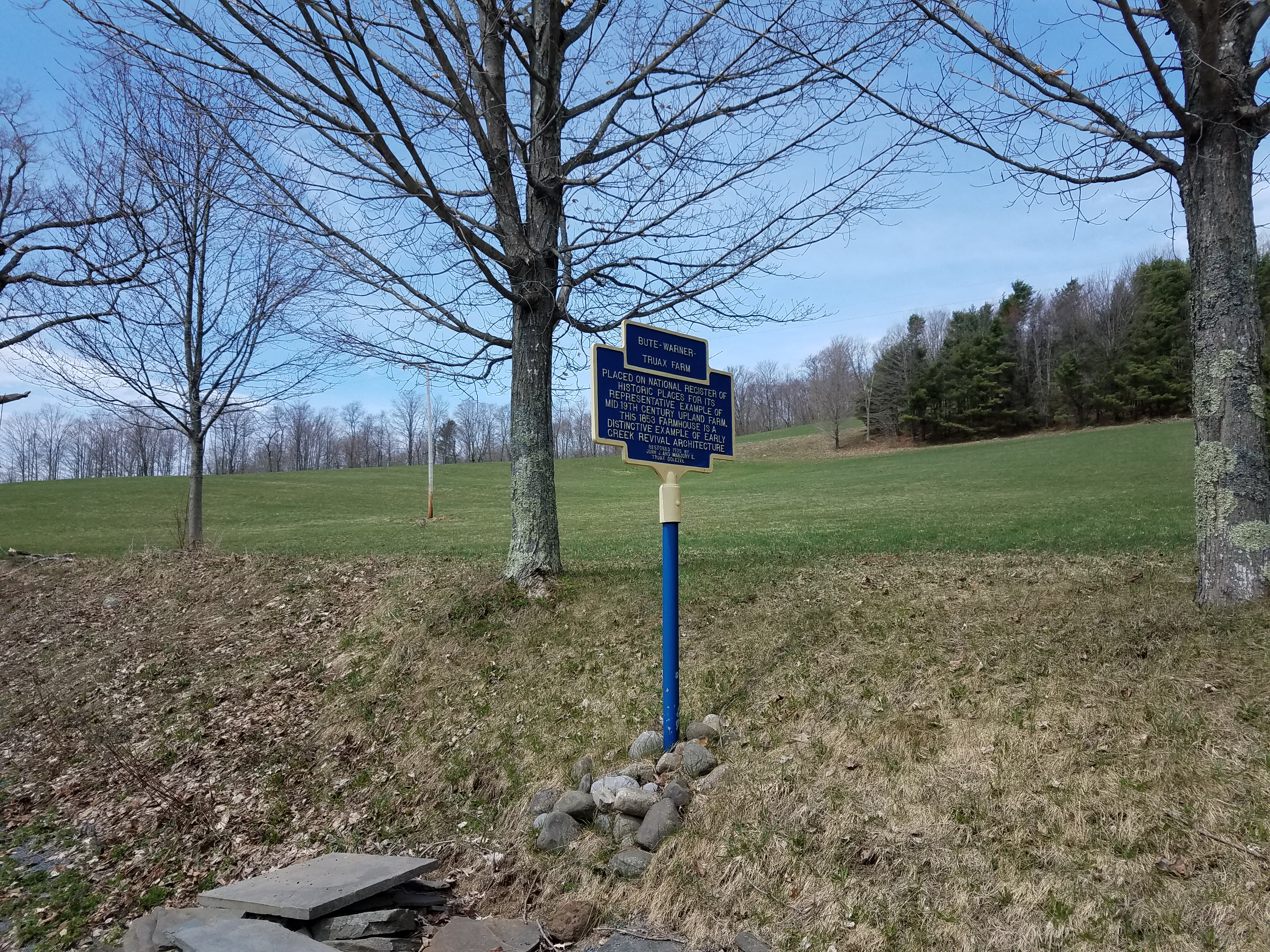
Farm's National Register sign
