= Lansing Hotaling =

American lawyer and politician (1839–1909)

Lansing Hotaling (April 17, 1839 – July 22, 1909) was an American lawyer and politician from Albany, New York.

== Life ==
Hotaling was born on April 17, 1839 in Albany, New York, the son of David I. Hotaling and Ellen Hillebrant. His father was a contractor and builder.

Hotaling attended Albany public schools, the Charlotteville Seminary, and the State Normal School. He graduated from the latter in 1856. In 1857, he began reading law with Oliver M. Hungerford. He was admitted to the bar in 1859, after which he practiced law in Albany. In 1861, he formed a partnership with Hungerford that lasted until Hungerford's death in 1888. He was elected district attorney of Albany County and served in that office for three years.

In 1884, Hotaling was elected to the New York State Assembly as a Republican, representing the Albany County 2nd District. He received the nomination the Saturday before the election, when the two Republican candidates running in that district withdrew from the race He served in the Assembly in 1885.

Hotaling was a trustee of the Albany County Savings Bank and a director of the Albany County Bank. He never married.

By the end of his life, Hotaling lived with his sister Mrs. John B. Slingerland, his only surviving relative. He died at his home there from heart disease on July 22, 1909. His funeral was conducted at his home by Rev. Lewis M. Lomsberry, pastor of the Trinity Methodist Church. He was buried in the Albany Rural Cemetery.

New York State Assembly
Preceded by Hiram Becker	New York State Assembly; Albany County, 2nd District; 1885	Succeeded by Smith O'Brien
