= John van Schaick Jr. =

American clergyman

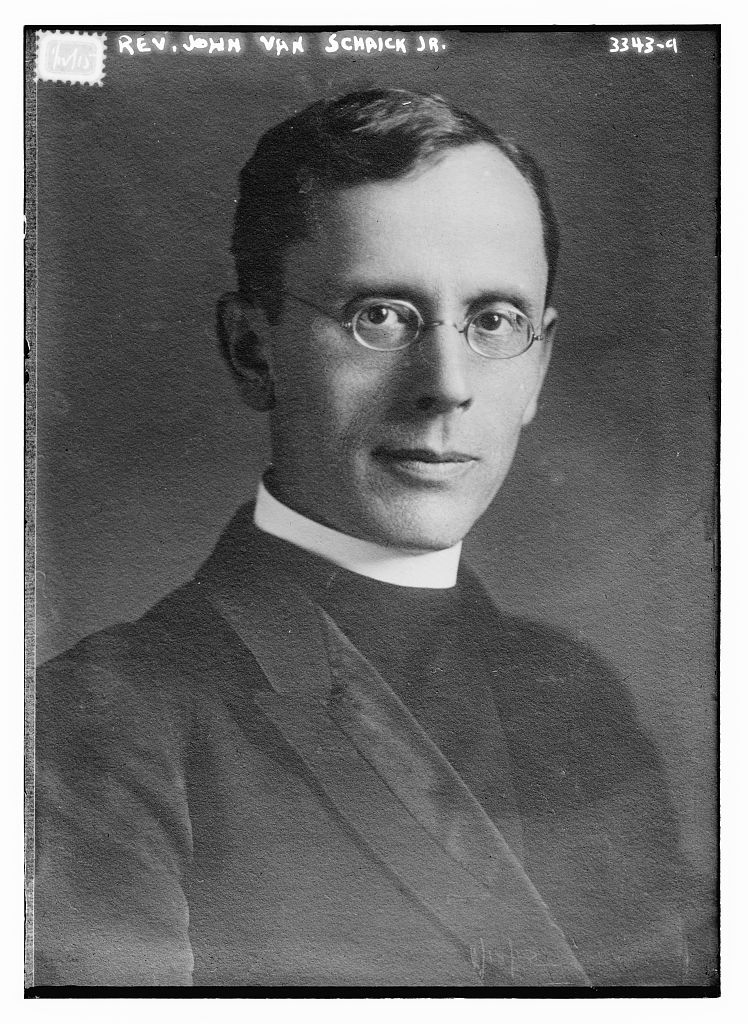
- Born: November 18, 1873; Cobleskill, New York
- Died: May 16, 1949 (aged 75); Washington, DC
- Father: John Van Schaick
- Relatives: Louis J. Van Schaick (brother)

John van Schaick Jr. (November 18, 1873 - May 16, 1949), was a minister of the Universalist National Memorial Church from 1900 to 1918, and again from 1920 to 1922.

== Biography ==
He was born in Cobleskill, New York, on November 18, 1873, to John van Schaick Sr. and Frances Elizabeth Shaver. He attended Union College in Schenectady, New York, from 1891 to 1894. He was principal of Sharon Springs Academy in Kansas, then was employed for a year as a history teacher at Emporia College.

He was ordained in 1900 at the Universalist National Memorial Church and was a minister there from 1900 to 1918, and again from 1920 to 1922.

He died on May 16, 1949, in Washington, D.C. His widow died in 1955.
