= Nasugbu =

Municipality in Batangas, Philippines

- Municipality
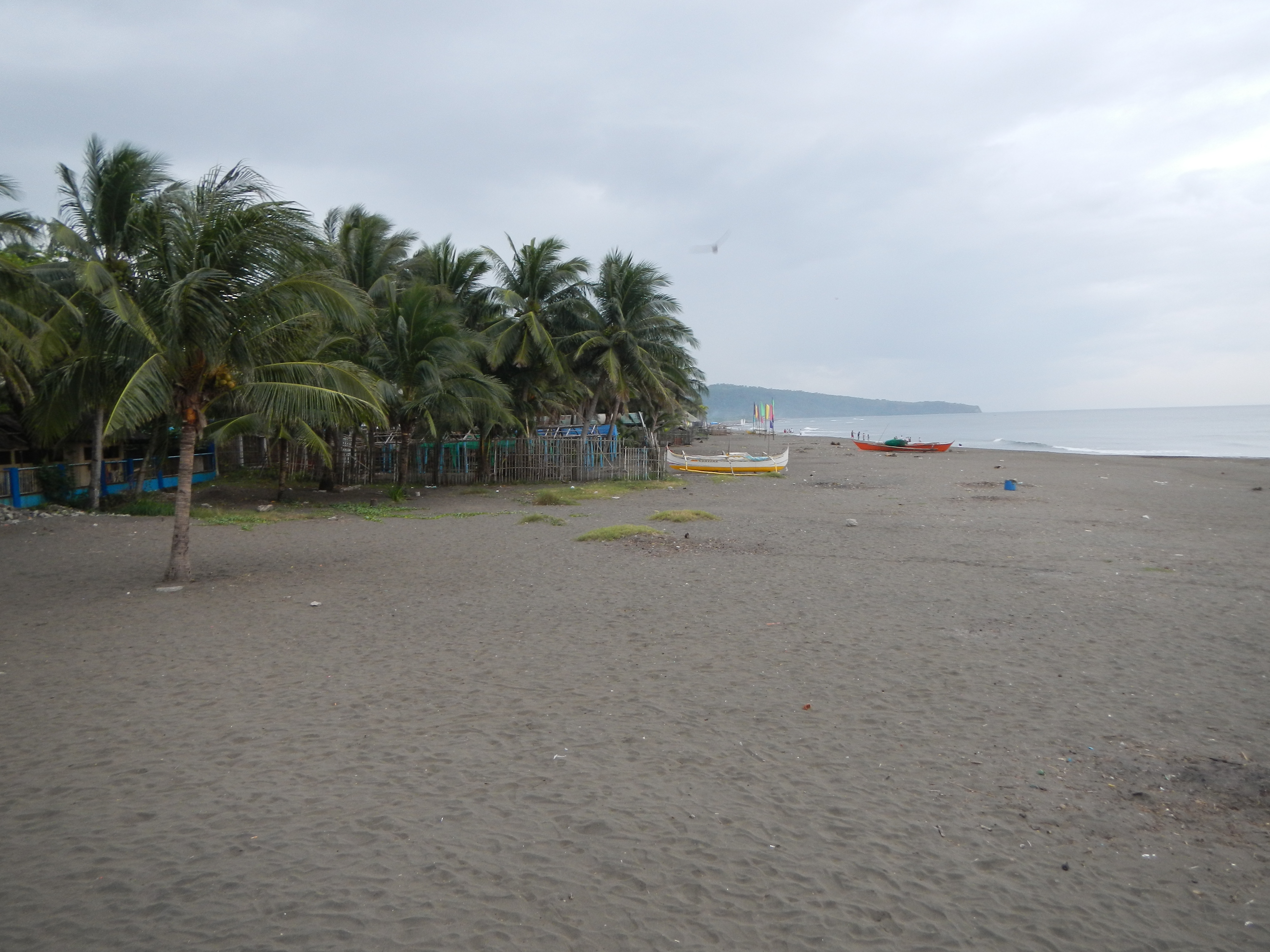
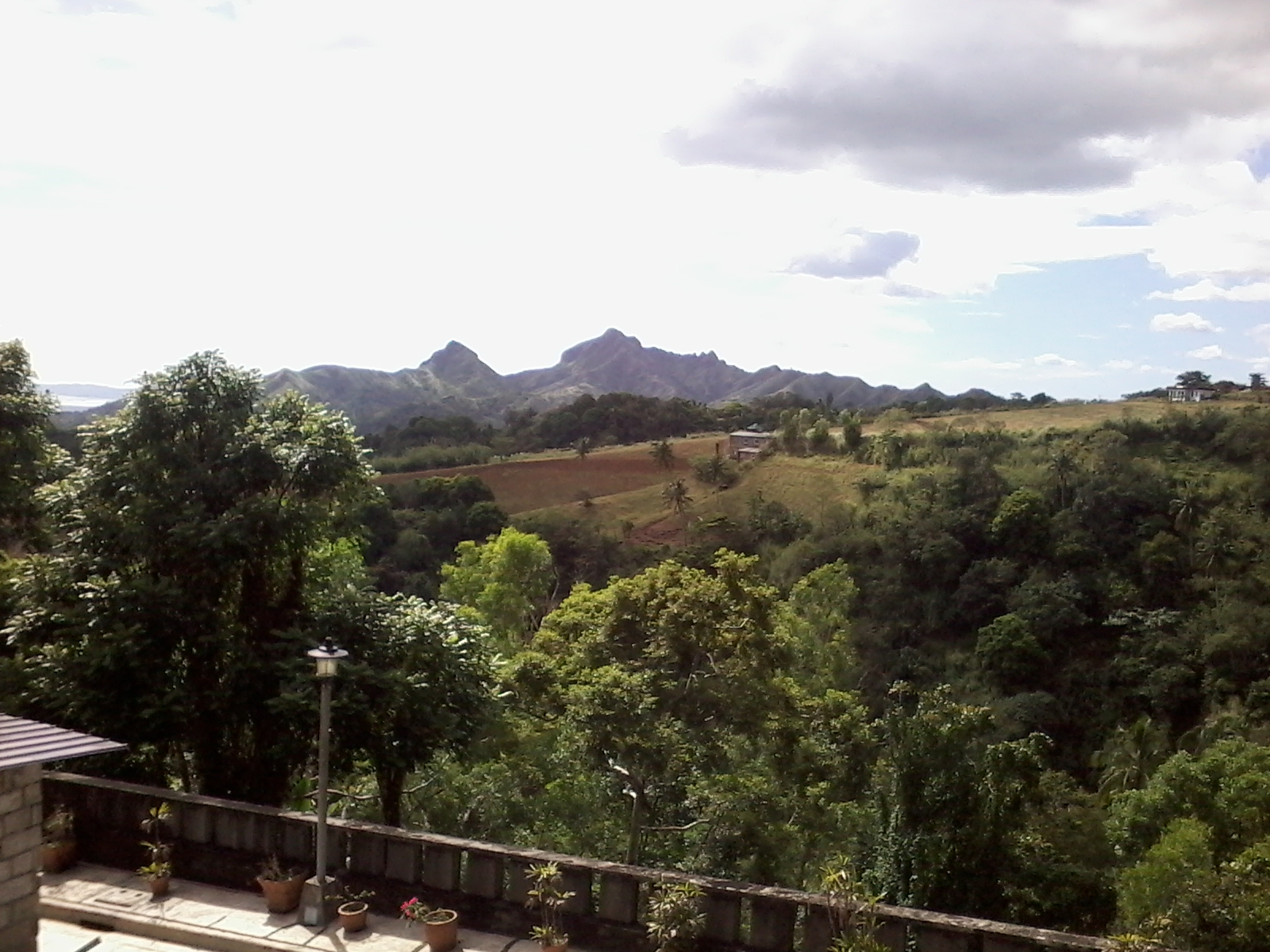
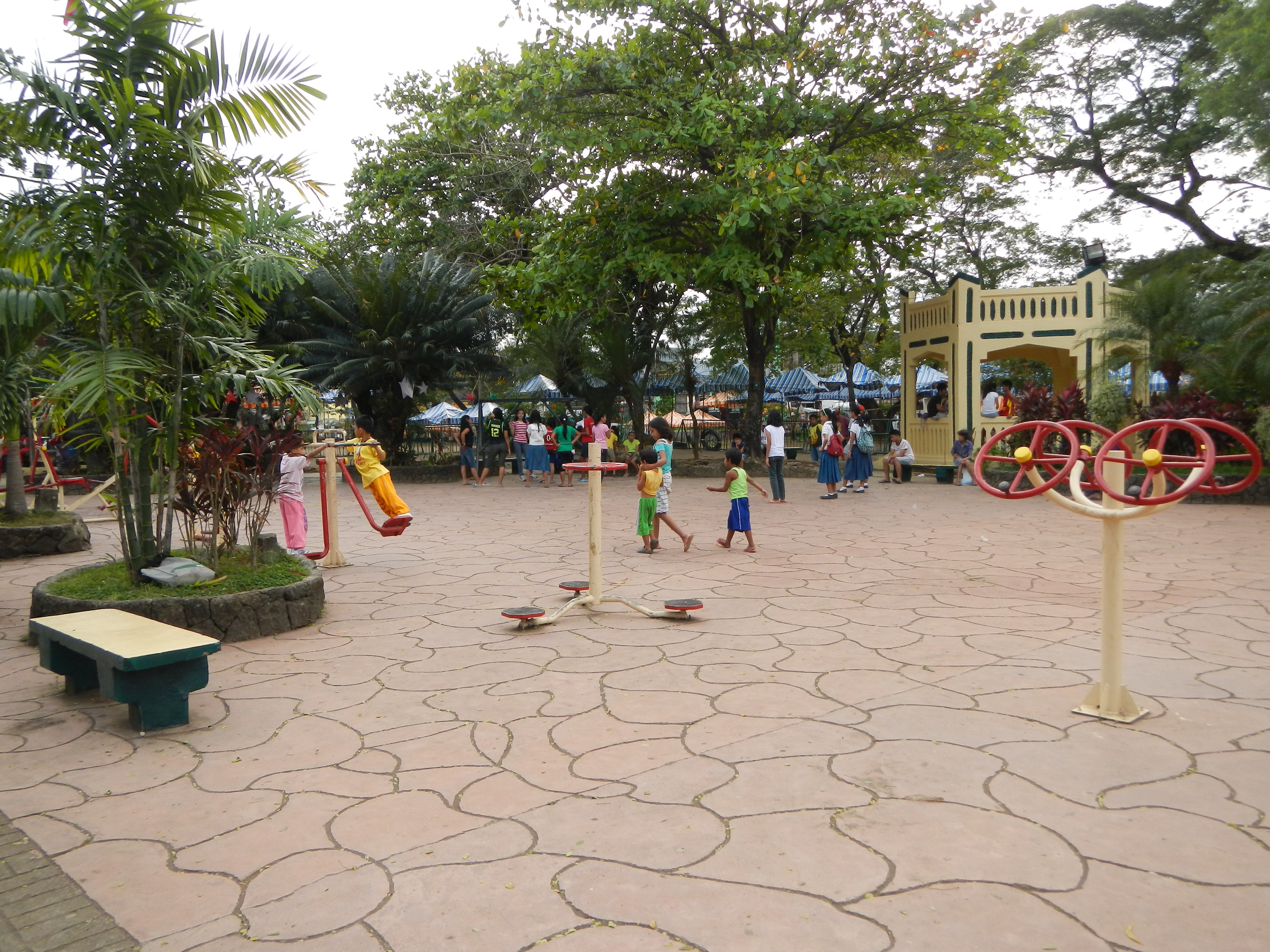
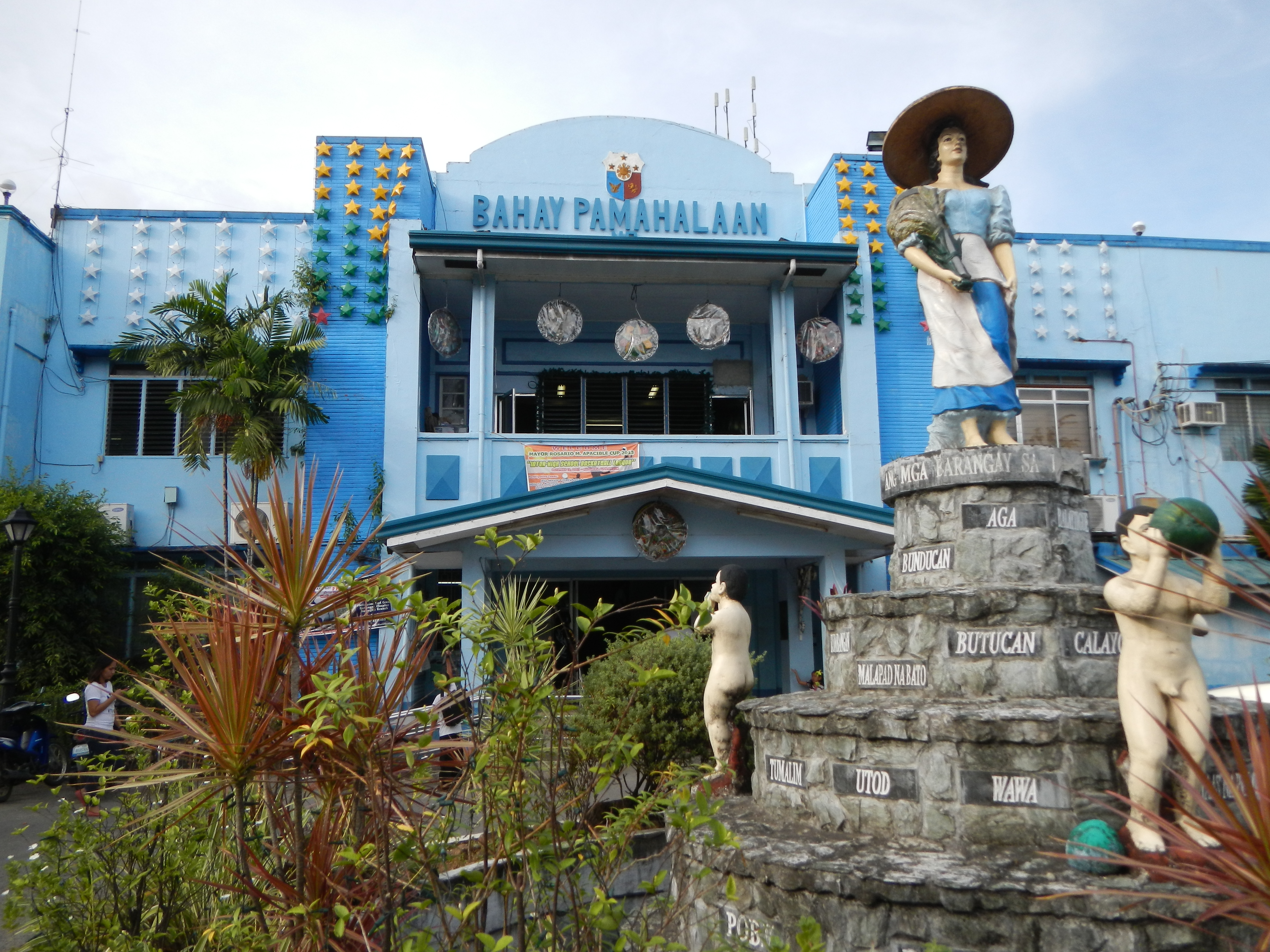
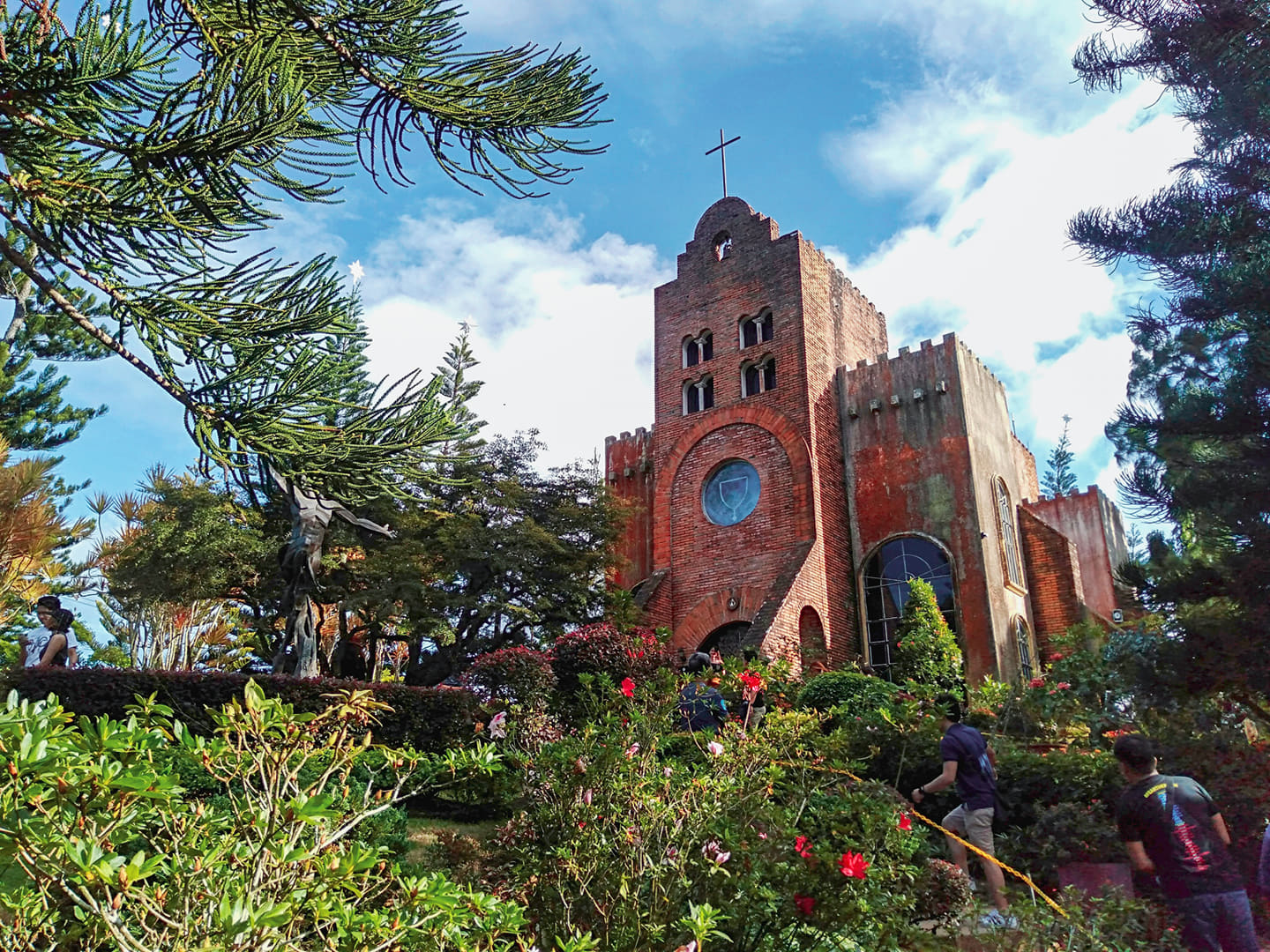
- Clockwise from top: Beach, Mount Batulao, Nasugbu Municipal Hall, Caleruega Church, Nasugbu Landing Monument, Plaza de Roxas

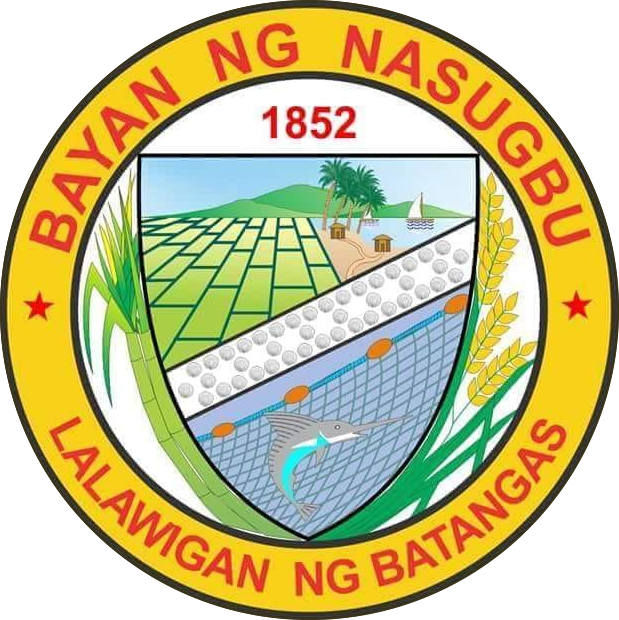
- Seal
- Nickname: Batangas' Last Frontier
- Motto: Bayan Ko, Mahal Ko (English: My Town, My Love)
- Map of Batangas with Nasugbu highlighted
- Interactive map of Nasugbu
- Location within the Philippines
- Coordinates: 14°04′N 120°38′E
- Country: Philippines
- Region: Calabarzon
- Province: Batangas
- District: 1st district
- Founded: 1808
- Barangays: 42 (see Barangays)

Government
  - Type: Sangguniang Bayan
  - Mayor: Antonio Jose A. Barcelon
  - Vice Mayor: Larry D. Albanio
  - Representative: Leandro Antonio L. Leviste
  - Municipal Council: Members: Arlene R. Chuidian; Marcos H. Guevarra; Anne Linette A. Vivas; Dionisio B. Botobara; Jehiel B. Barcelon; Jose Mari S. Bautista; Wilfredo V. Limboc; King W. Gumba
  - Electorate: 89,379 voters (2025)

Area
  - Total: 278.51 km^{2} (107.53 sq mi)
- Elevation: 55 m (180 ft)
- Highest elevation: 761 m (2,497 ft)
- Lowest elevation: 0 m (0 ft)

Population (2024 census)
  - Total: 141,063
  - Density: 506.49/km^{2} (1,311.8/sq mi)
  - Households: 32,881

Economy
  - Income class: 1st municipal income class
  - Poverty incidence: 10.34% (2023)
  - Revenue: ₱ 669.5 million (2024)
  - Assets: ₱ 3,927 million (2024)
  - Expenditure: ₱ 301.7 million (2024)
  - Liabilities: ₱ 1,688 million (2024)

Service provider
  - Electricity: Batangas 1 Electric Cooperative (BATELEC 1)
- Time zone: UTC+8 (PST)
- ZIP code: 4231
- PSGC: 0401019000
- IDD : area code: +63 (0)43
- Native languages: Tagalog
- Website: www.nasugbu.gov.ph

Nasugbu, officially the Municipality of Nasugbu (Tagalog: Bayan ng Nasugbu), is a municipality in the province of Batangas, Philippines. According to the 2024 census, it has a population of 141,063 people. It is the largest municipality in Batangas, with an area of 278.51 square kilometres (107.53 sq mi).

== History ==
=== Precolonial period ===
Nasugbu was known as Manisua and were inhabited by Tagalogs. However, some areas like modern-day Catandaan were inhabited by Aetas.

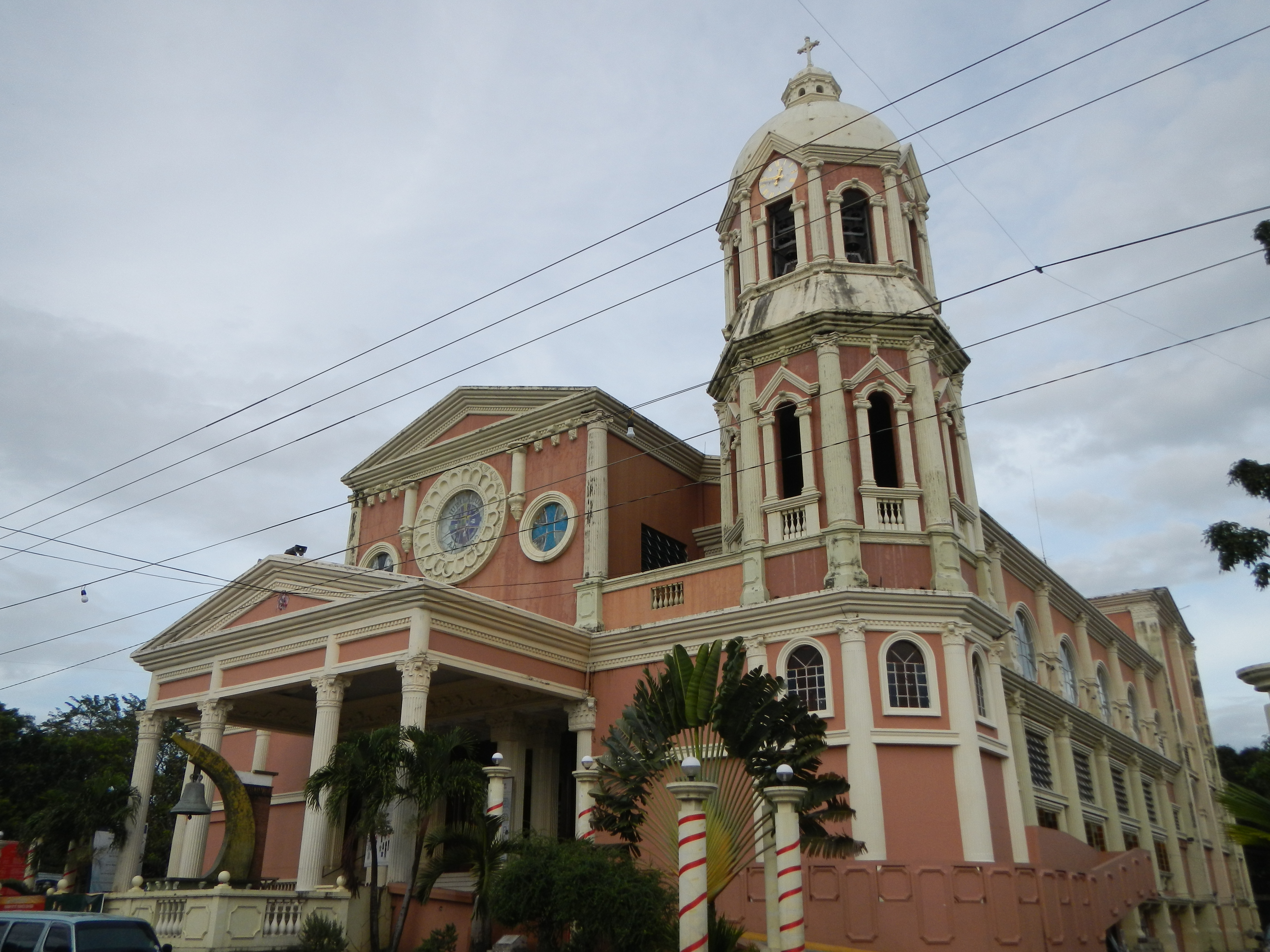
The romanesque façade of St. Francis Xavier Parish Church along J. P. Laurel Street.

=== Spanish period ===
Nasugbu was founded in 1580 by the name of Manisua after the Tagalogs of the region converted to Christianity through missionary work. By 1591, it was handed to the Jesuits. The center of the town was at a site now known as Lumang Bayan. The Spaniards played a crucial role in developing the town by creating schools and markets within the town. However, excessive tributes and hard labor caused hardships for the people. In 1852, the Jesuits founded the Parish of St. Francis Xavier in 1852 for the Christians of the town. During this period, Nasugbu did not become an important commercial center due to the proximity of Balayan.

==== Nasugbu Revolt ====
A native tribesman, known only as Matienza, led his fellow Nasugbugueños, together with some natives from the nearby Lian, led a revolt against a large land grant to the Roxases. This revolt failed. This happened in the latter part of the 19th century.

=== Revolutionary period ===
In 1896, during the Philippine Revolution, Nasugbu was one of the many towns that revolted against Spanish rule. When the revolution officially started in Batangas in September, an organized revolt also broke out in the town of Nasugbu, together with the towns of Balayan, Lian, Talisay, and Lemery seven weeks later. The Revolt of Nasugbu was led by Luciano San Miguel and was one of the largest revolts in the province. However, on 12 December 1896, San Miguel unknowingly led his men into a trap, and Nasugbu suffered the greatest number of casualties in the revolution. They retreated and reorganized in Barrio Bunducan under the leadership of Generals Eleuterio and Francisco Marasigan. They were again defeated, causing the people in the area to evacuate. As an act of vengeance, the Spanish forces burned over 500 homes in Nasugbu, killing 500 people who were unable to leave the town.

On 12 June 1898, the town of Cauit (Kawit) in Cavite declared independence from Spanish rule. This made the life of the Caviteños more tumultuous than before. Due to this, the people of the nearby town of Alfonso invaded the Roxas estate and started to harass the tenants there. Although the municipal officials of Nasugbu responded quickly and complained to their counterparts in Cavite, the citizens were already defying authority.

Nasugbu was not as much irrigated as the fields of nearby towns, making it one of the towns that suffered much when the town of Lipa was besieged on 18 June 1898. Ten days later the effects for the people of Nasugbu were so dire that the Gobernadorcillo authorised taking 1,000 pesos from the treasury of Lipa to provide a rice subsidy for the people of Nasugbu.

By 1899, the center of the town was relocated to a higher place due to floods. The town composed primarily of people working for hacienderos who owned most of the land in the town.

=== American period ===
During times of war, Batangas was administered by the Governor General and the right of habeas corpus was suspended, resulting in more casualties.

On 28 March 1903, the adjacent municipality of Lian was merged with Nasugbu. It later separated from Nasugbu effective 1 January 1915 by virtue of Executive Order No. 127 signed by Governor-General Francis Burton Harrison four days prior, restoring its independent municipality status.

=== World War II ===
After the Imperial Japanese Army arrived in Nasugbu in the first week of January 1942, they committed various atrocities in the town causing the people from the Poblacion and Lumbangan to retreat to Calayo. During the Japanese occupation, a guerilla group called the Blue Eagle Command set up its headquarters in Barrio Banilad within the town.

In 1943, banditry was rampant in the barrios of Dayap and Latag. After wealthy merchants had sought refuge in Dayap, the barrio was attacked by bandits under a Moro leader. The invaders were repulsed after a firefight by locals, led by a local leader named Ariston Ularte. They killed three of the intruders, including their leader. The outlaws never returned.

After American forces landed on the shores of Nasugbu on 31 January 1945, soldiers of the Japanese Imperial Army, as they retreated, they committed atrocities and murdered the inhabitants who were found in their homes.

=== Contemporary period ===
During the 1970s, the hacienderos decided to sell their holdings to the people over a 10-year period.

=== Archeological significance ===
==== The Nasugbu Cow ====
The Dark Age of Nasugbu was compensated by a great archaeological discovery. According to the National Museum of the Philippines, a group of scientists found a wooden cow a year before the Second World War. Knowing that it was of great significance to the history of the country, the cow was immediately handed over the National Museum, but it did not survive the destruction of the war. However, a year after the war, a new archaeological artifact was excavated in the nearby town of Calatagan, which in turn became the most important prehistoric artifact of the country.

== Geography ==
According to the Philippine Statistics Authority, the municipality has a land area of 278.51 square kilometers (107.53 sq mi) constituting 8.93% of the 3,119.75-square-kilometer (1,204.54 sq mi) total area of Batangas. It is 77 kilometres (48 mi) from Batangas City, 95 kilometres (59 mi) from Manila, and 85 kilometres (53 mi) from Imus.

=== Topography ===
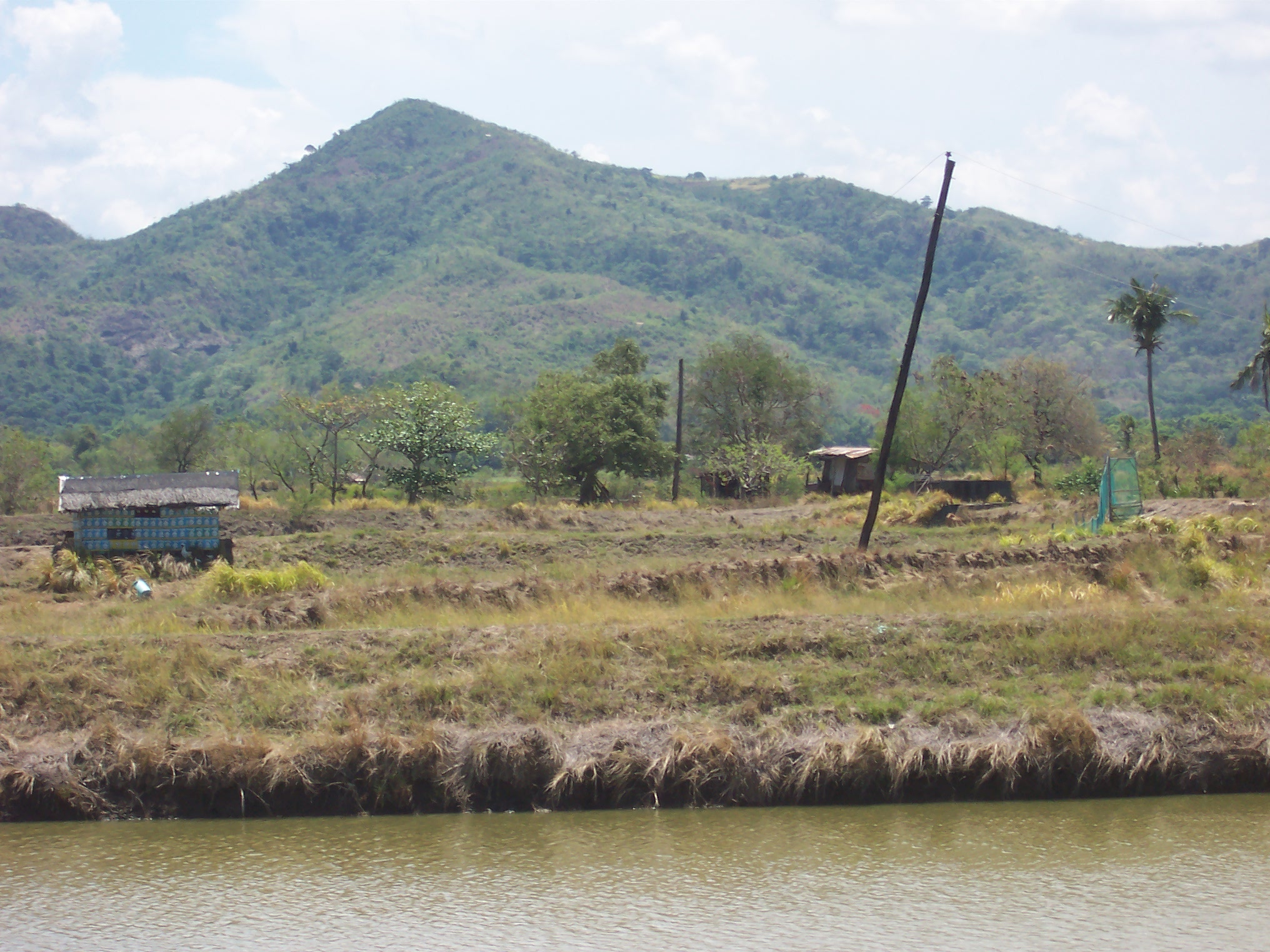
Nasugbu is characterized by rolling hills, wide plains, and farmlands.

Nasugbu is bounded on the north by the municipalities of Maragondon, Magallanes and Alfonso in the province of Cavite; on the east by the Batangas municipalities of Laurel, Calaca, and Balayan; on the south by the Batangas municipalities of Lian and Tuy; and on the west by the South China Sea.

Entering the town proper via the national highway, one passes fields of sugar cane, corn, and rice fields; hills and mountains. The terrain slopes downwards to the South China Sea. Because of its rolling terrain and coastline location, agriculture (sugarcane, rice, corn, vegetables, coconut, fruits), and aquaculture are Nasugbu's main industries.

=== Barangays ===
Nasugbu is politically subdivided into 42 barangays, as shown in the matrix below. Each barangay consists of puroks and some have sitios.

Currently, there are 3 barangays which are classified as urban (highlighted in bold).

PSGC	Barangay	Population			±% p.a.	
		2024		2010		
041019001	Aga	4.7%	6,577	5,889	▴	0.77%
041019002	Balaytigui	3.1%	4,426	4,059	▴	0.60%
041019003	Banilad	3.6%	5,072	4,585	▴	0.70%
041019004	Barangay 10 (Poblacion)	0.8%	1,074	981	▴	0.63%
041019005	**Barangay 11 (Poblacion)**	2.0%	2,846	2,844	▴	0.00%
041019006	Barangay 12 (Poblacion)	1.7%	2,398	2,299	▴	0.29%
041019007	Barangay 2 (Poblacion)	1.2%	1,750	1,485	▴	1.15%
041019008	**Barangay 3 (Poblacion)**	0.9%	1,283	1,160	▴	0.70%
041019009	Barangay 4 (Poblacion)	1.1%	1,554	1,412	▴	0.67%
041019010	**Barangay 5 (Poblacion)**	1.4%	2,028	2,016	▴	0.04%
041019011	Barangay 6 (Poblacion)	1.7%	2,450	2,368	▴	0.24%
041019012	Barangay 7 (Poblacion)	1.0%	1,463	1,446	▴	0.08%
041019013	Barangay 8 (Poblacion)	0.9%	1,302	1,188	▴	0.64%
041019014	Barangay 9 (Poblacion)	0.6%	902	891	▴	0.09%
041019015	Bilaran	4.8%	6,831	5,022	▴	2.16%
041019016	Bucana	3.0%	4,253	3,841	▴	0.71%
041019017	Bulihan	2.0%	2,845	2,534	▴	0.81%
041019018	Bunducan	1.5%	2,144	1,778	▴	1.31%
041019019	Butucan	1.5%	2,112	2,108	▴	0.01%
041019020	Calayo	1.8%	2,574	2,340	▴	0.66%
041019021	Catandaan	1.4%	2,018	1,845	▴	0.62%
041019022	Kaylaway	5.2%	7,270	6,377	▴	0.91%
041019023	Kayrilaw	1.2%	1,630	1,546	▴	0.37%
041019024	Cogunan	3.3%	4,608	3,933	▴	1.11%
041019026	Dayap	1.4%	1,945	1,644	▴	1.17%
041019027	Latag	1.9%	2,727	2,515	▴	0.56%
041019028	Looc	3.0%	4,204	3,970	▴	0.40%
041019029	Lumbangan	4.8%	6,823	6,579	▴	0.25%
041019032	Malapad na Bato	0.9%	1,330	1,210	▴	0.66%
041019033	Mataas na Pulo	1.2%	1,736	1,726	▴	0.04%
041019035	Maugat	0.9%	1,242	1,117	▴	0.74%
041019036	Munting Indan	2.2%	3,141	2,992	▴	0.34%
041019037	Natipuan	1.8%	2,474	2,063	▴	1.27%
041019039	Pantalan	2.7%	3,831	3,686	▴	0.27%
041019041	Papaya	1.9%	2,628	2,519	▴	0.29%
041019042	Putat	2.2%	3,060	2,751	▴	0.74%
041019044	Reparo	1.5%	2,119	1,987	▴	0.45%
041019045	Talangan	2.1%	2,897	2,673	▴	0.56%
041019046	Tumalim	2.8%	4,003	3,937	▴	0.12%
041019047	Utod	1.0%	1,410	1,175	▴	1.27%
041019048	Wawa	10.9%	15,328	14,352	▴	0.46%
041019049	Barangay 1 (Poblacion)	1.3%	1,805	1,640	▴	0.67%
	**Total**		141,063	122,483	▴	0.99%

=== Climate ===
Climate data for Nasugbu, Batangas
Month	Jan	Feb	Mar	Apr	May	Jun	Jul	Aug	Sep	Oct	Nov	Dec	Year
Mean daily maximum °C (°F)	29 (84)	30 (86)	31 (88)	33 (91)	32 (90)	30 (86)	29 (84)	29 (84)	29 (84)	29 (84)	29 (84)	29 (84)	30 (86)
Mean daily minimum °C (°F)	20 (68)	20 (68)	21 (70)	22 (72)	24 (75)	24 (75)	24 (75)	24 (75)	24 (75)	23 (73)	22 (72)	21 (70)	22 (72)
Average precipitation mm (inches)	11 (0.4)	13 (0.5)	14 (0.6)	32 (1.3)	101 (4.0)	142 (5.6)	208 (8.2)	187 (7.4)	175 (6.9)	131 (5.2)	68 (2.7)	39 (1.5)	1,121 (44.3)
Average rainy days	5.2	5.0	7.4	11.5	19.8	23.5	27.0	25.9	25.2	23.2	15.5	8.3	197.5
Source: Meteoblue

The climate of Nasugbu falls under the first type of classification, Type I, characterized by two pronounced seasons: Dry season from November to April and wet season for the rest of the year. The annual average temperature in the municipality is 27.3 °C (81.1 °F). January is the coolest month having an average temperature of 25.8 °C (78.4 °F), while April is the warmest month registering an average temperature of 29 °C (84 °F).

== Demographics ==
Population census of Nasugbu

Year	Pop.	±% p.a.
1903	6,680	—
1918	12,423	+4.22%
1939	19,820	+2.25%
1948	23,668	+1.99%
1960	34,845	+3.28%
1970	46,849	+3.00%

Year	Pop.	±% p.a.
1975	50,822	+1.65%
1980	59,405	+3.17%
1990	75,515	+2.43%
1995	83,874	+1.99%
2000	96,113	+2.96%
2007	113,926	+2.37%

Year	Pop.	±% p.a.
2010	122,483	+2.67%
2015	134,113	+1.74%
2020	136,524	+0.38%
2024	141,063	+0.79%

Source: Philippine Statistics Authority

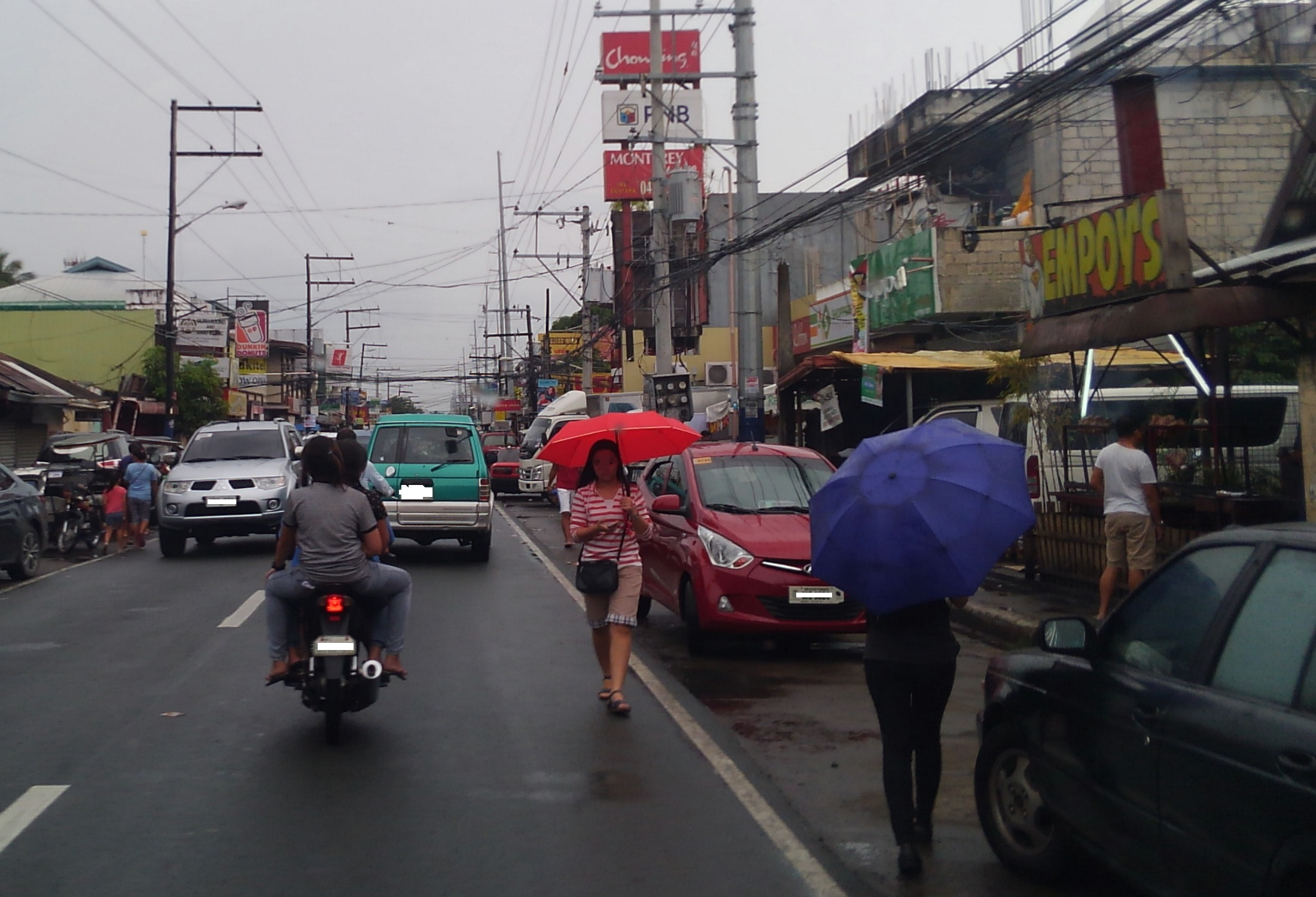
Town center

In the 2024 census, Nasugbu had a population of 141,063 people. The population density was 510 inhabitants per square kilometer (1,300/sq mi).

=== Ethnic groups and languages ===
Most of the people in Nasugbu are Tagalogs. In recent years, there's been a noticeable increase of Visayans in Barangay Wawa and other barangays. The main language spoken is Tagalog, and a significant number now speaks Cebuano and Hiligaynon. Due to the historic relevance of the town, a small number of families speak Spanish. Many among the educated class speak English.

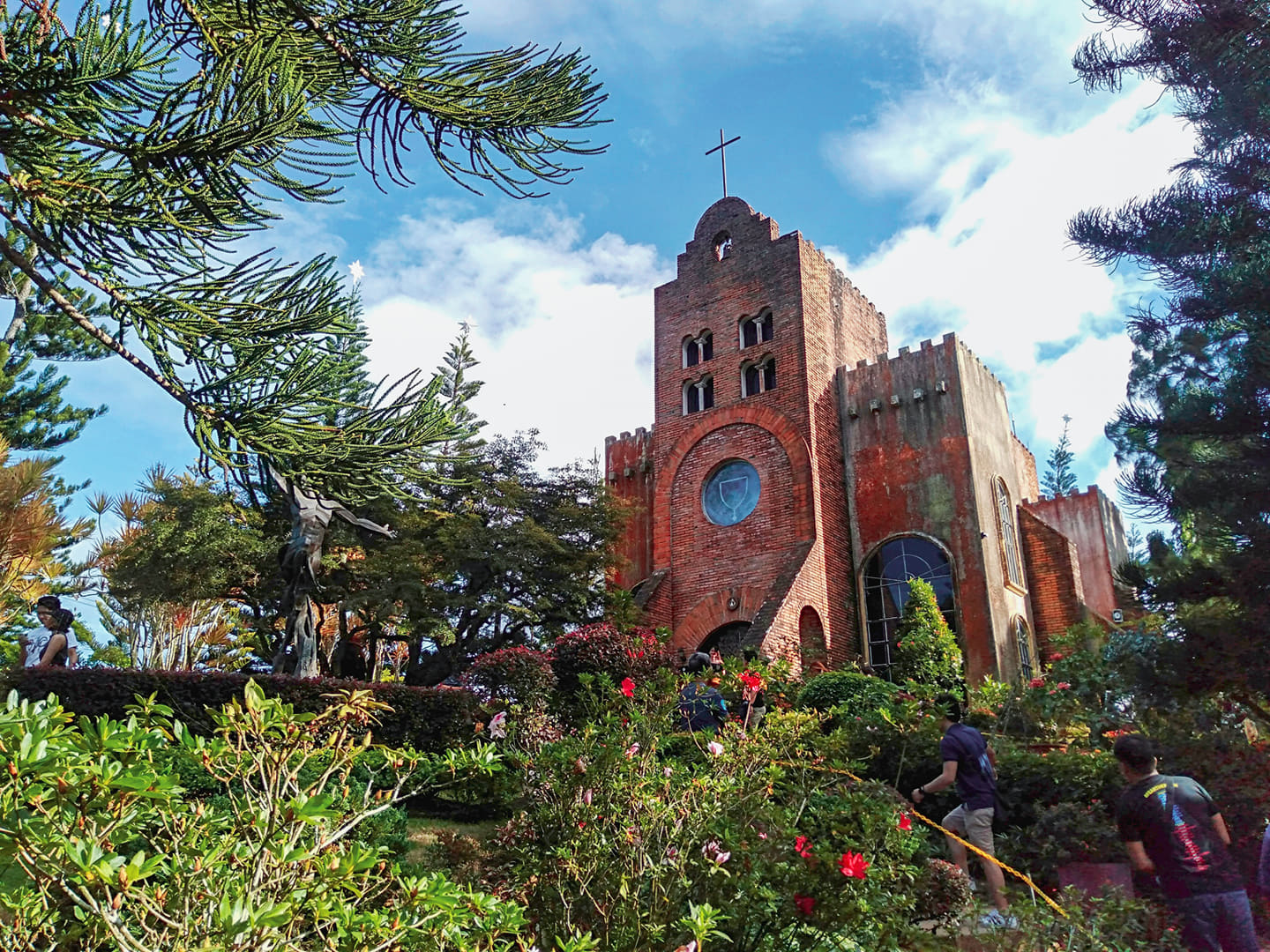
Caleruega Church

=== Religion ===
A great majority of Nasugbugueños are Catholics. Although there is a legislated separation of church and state in the Philippines, the town fiesta on December 3 is a holiday. Nasugbu is also one of the most important centres of the Roman Catholic Church in the Archdiocese of Lipa. Though officially called Vicariate I, it is sometimes called the Vicariate of San Francisco Xavier in honour of the town's patron saint. Some barangays have their own respective patron saints and celebrate a feast day other than that of Saint Francis Xavier's.

With the growing number of Catholic faithfuls in the town, it has been proposed that Saint Francis Xavier Parish would be divided into two. The proposed new parish is to be called the Parish of San Antonio de Padua and would have its parochial church at barangay Kaylaway. As of today, San Antonio de Padua functions as parish with its own council and ministries.

The minority belong to other minor religions like the indigenous Iglesia ni Cristo; The Church of Jesus Christ of Latter-day Saints (Mormons); Evangelical Christianity; and the UCCP.

== Economy ==
Poverty incidence of Nasugbu (%)

Source: Philippine Statistics Authority

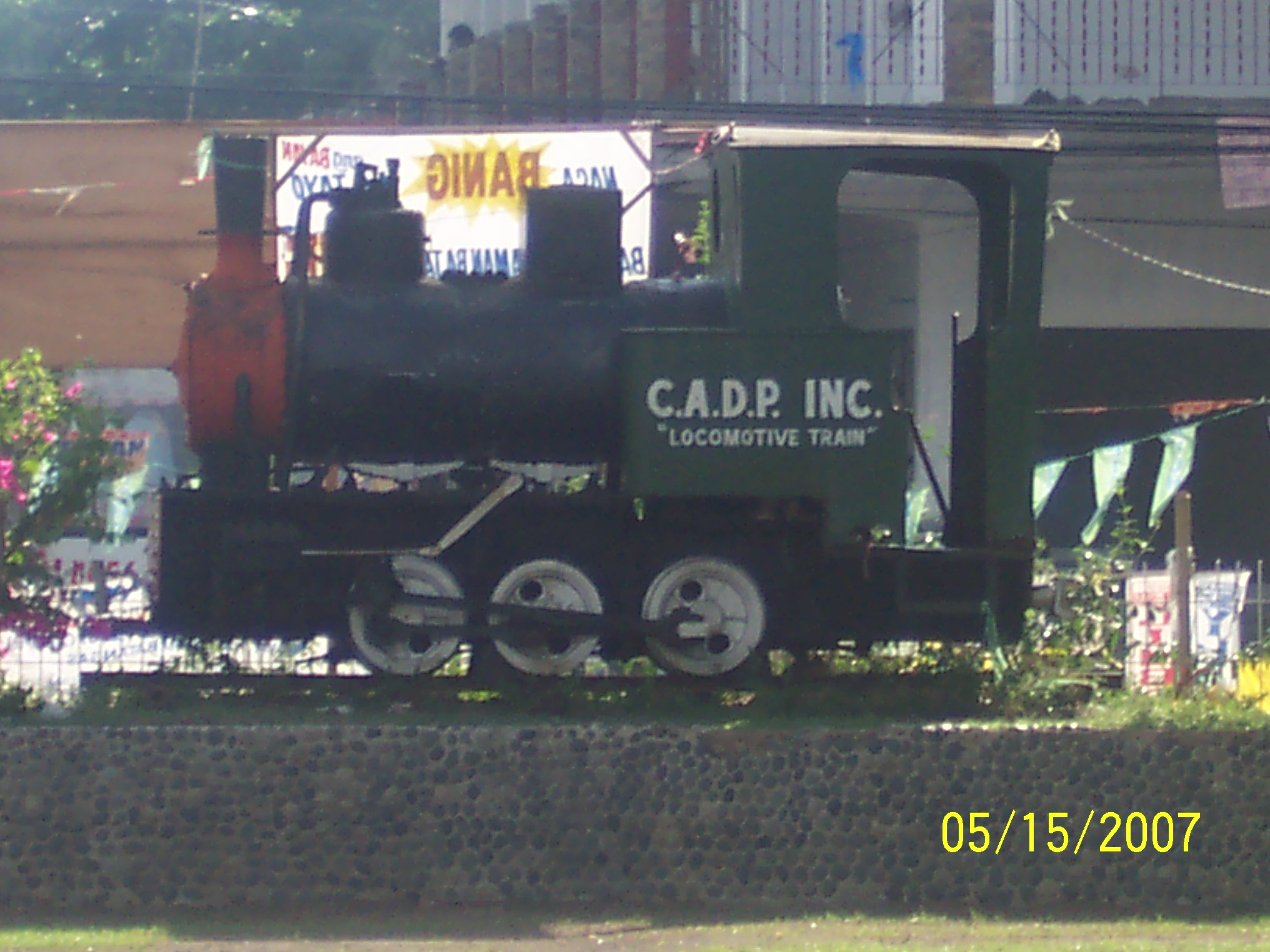
An example of the locomotive used by the Central Azucarera Don Pedro during their early days. CADP was one of the largest sugar mills in the Philippines.

In Presidential Decree 1520, president Ferdinand Marcos declared some areas of the municipality as a potential tourism area. Since then, Nasugbu has had a tourism industry focused primarily on its beaches. Its proximity to Manila makes it a popular choice.

Some economic highlights are the development of Nasugbu's agro-industrial industry (feed mills, meat processing, and poultry-growing) by building more farm-to-market roads. Hiking in the mountains and virgin forests around Nasugbu is popular. One particular spot, Karakawa, is a series of multi-tiered naturally formed rock pools hewn out of the mountain. The smallest pool is about the size of a Jacuzzi, while the biggest measures about 25 square meters (270 sq ft). The pools are more than 6 meters (20 ft) deep, and one can catch fish in the pools.

=== Agriculture ===
At the moment, because of its rolling terrain and coastline location, agriculture (sugarcane, rice, corn, vegetables, coconut, fruits), and aquaculture are Nasugbu's main industries. It was home to the Central Azucarera Don Pedro, one of the country's largest sugar producers. Roxas Holdings Incorporated on March 29, 2024, permanently closed its wholly owned subsidiary, the 97-year-old Central Azucarera Don Pedro in Nasugbu where Manny Pangilinan is vice-chairman. Founded in 1927, CADPI's "serious business losses" resulted in the termination of all its employees. In 2023, it shut down its milling operations and sold its sugarcane mill in Nasugbu, Batangas to Universal Robina Corporation, which operates a sugar mill in nearby Balayan, Batangas.

Being home to one of the largest sugar milling companies of the country, the production of sweets is a significant portion of the local economy. Nasugbu is the only town in Luzon which hosts a bibingkahan (rice cake area) in its public market. There are at least 10 kinds of rice cakes that are found only in Nasugbu, in addition to the varieties that could be found elsewhere in the country. Many Nasugbugueños, even those who do not do much cooking, take pride in making a variety of sweets such as sweetened yam, sweetened coconut, and similar products.

=== Tourism ===
St. Francis Xavier and St. Lorenzo Ruiz, the two patrons of the Town.

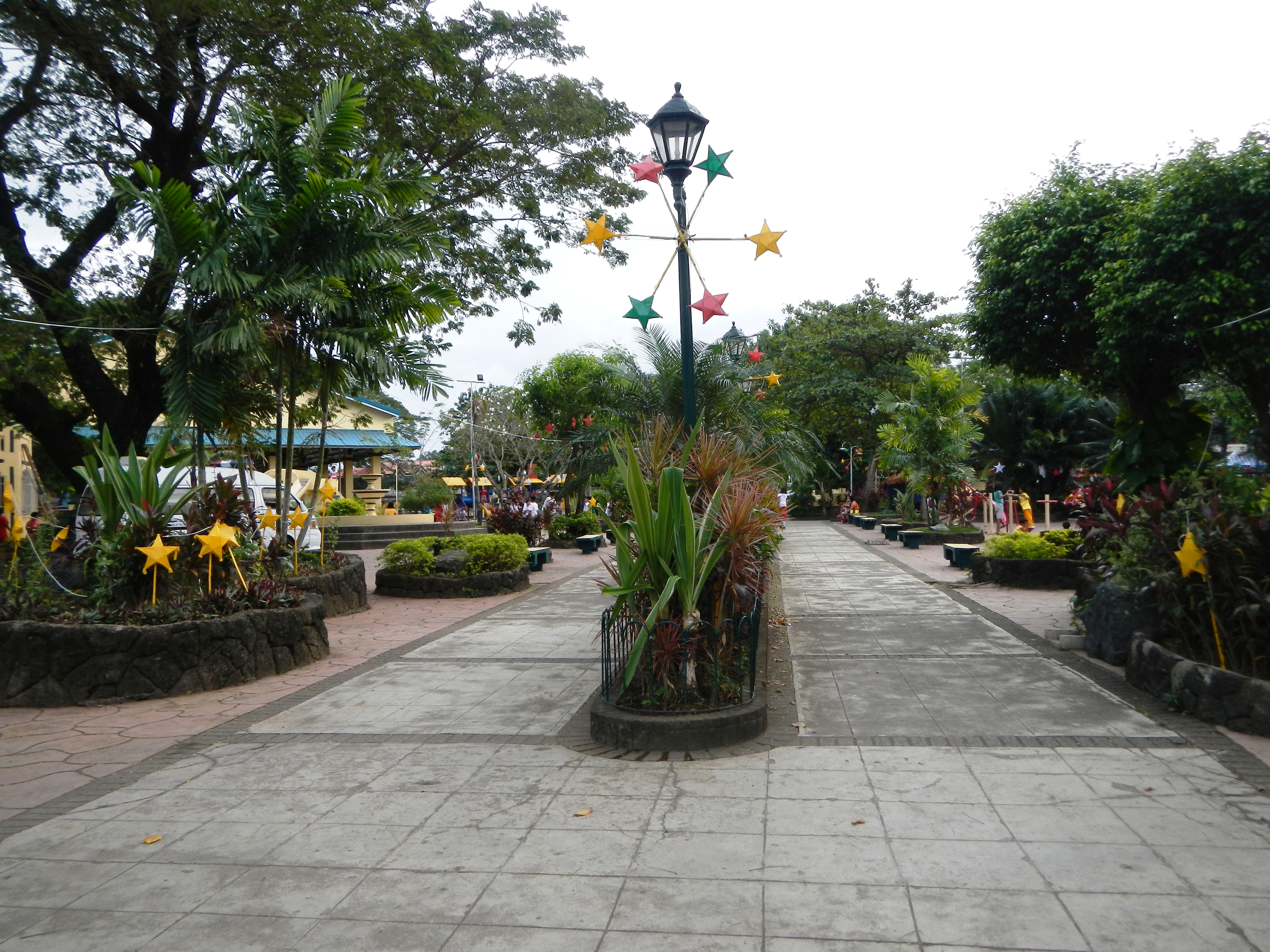
Plaza de Roxas

Nasugbu has built a reputation as a resort town known for its beaches.

On August 3, 2007, by Executive Order 647, President Gloria Macapagal Arroyo declared Nasugbu, known for its white sand beach resorts, a special tourism zone, mandating the formation of a private sector-led "Nasugbu eminent persons group" to oversee development. The Nasugbu Special Tourism Zone will cover areas included in the Nasugbu Tourism Development Plan prepared by the municipal government and validated by the Philippine Tourism Authority (PTA). SM Investments Corp. (SMIC) built a 59 km^{2} (23 sq mi) resort, the Hamilo Coast, at the NSTZ. Also included in the tourism zone are Punta Fuego and Mounts Palay-Palay–Mataas-na-Gulod Protected Landscape where Mount Pico de Loro is located.

== Government ==
=== Local government ===
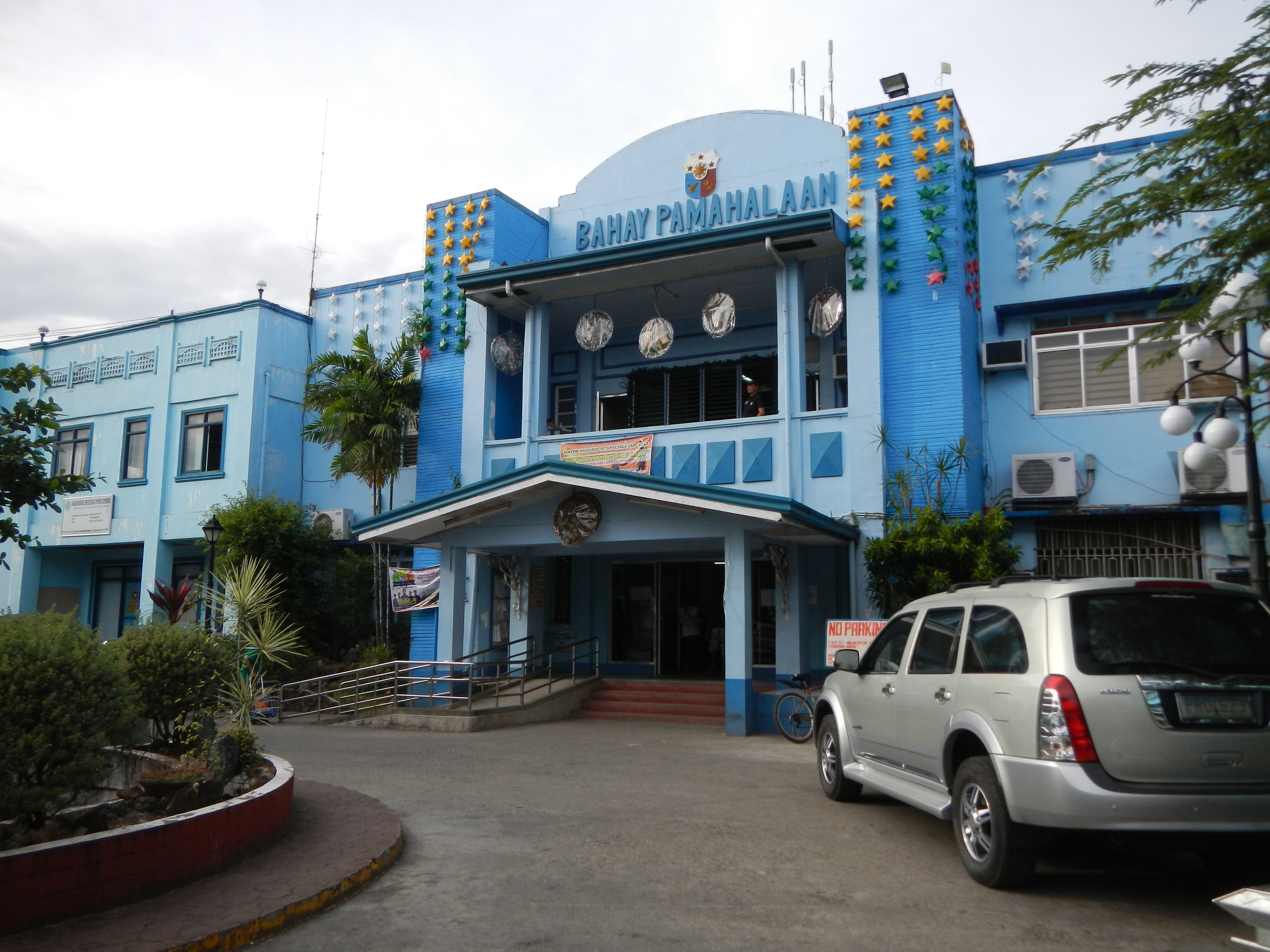
Municipal hall

In the May 2019 elections, Antonio "Tony" Barcelon won the mayoralty seat. Just like other municipalities, the local government is headed by the mayor, with the vice mayor serving as the deputy and the presiding officer of the eight-seat Nasugbu Municipal Council.

== Education ==
There are two schools district offices which govern all educational institutions within the municipality. They oversee the management and operations of all private and public, from primary to secondary schools. These are the Nasugbu East Schools District Office, and Nasugbu West Schools District Office.

Nasugbu West Central School is the largest elementary school in the Southern Tagalog region. Other elementary schools in the town proper include Lourderette School, Pedagogia, Saint Paul's, RB Cordero Academy and Creative Dreams School. Most barangays have their own grade schools, and some in recent years also have high schools, as in Bilaran and Kaylaway.

Nasugbu Institute, founded in 1932, is a private high school. Nasugbu also hosts the high school campus of the Batangas State University, known locally as the Apolinario R. Apacible School of Fisheries (or simply "Fisheries"). It was formerly a fishery school with courses including Fish Culture, Fish Capture, and Fish Preservation, but was later attached to the Batangas State University. Presently, aside from Fishery courses, the school also offers other courses like Nutrition and Dietetics, Nursing, Education, and Tourism. Other relatively new high schools are Nasugbu Christian Faith Academy, Adelaido A. Bayot Memorial School, and the RB Cordero Academy. Other schools in Nasugbu include Nasugbu East Central School, Nasugbu West Central School, Nicolites Montessori School, Pantalan Elementary School, and Bilaran Elementary School and many others.

The town is home to the Nasugbu Auditorium, where many cultural activities regularly are held. It is the town's primary theatre and showcases not only plays but also concerts of popular artists and bands.

=== Primary and elementary schools ===
- Academia De San Francisco Javier Batangas
- ACCPI-Jeremiah Learning Center
- Aga Elementary School
- Balaytigue Elementary School
- Balokbalok Elementary School
- Bayabasan Elementary School
- Bilaran Elementary School
- Bucana Primary School
- Bulihan Elementary School
- Bunducan Elementary School
- Calayo Elementary School
- Catandaan Elementary School
- Cogonan Elementary School
- Creative Dreams School
- Dayap Elementary School
- Kaylaway Elementary School
- Kaylaway II Elementary School
- Kayrilaw Elementary School
- Latag Elementary School
- Looc Elementary School
- Malapad Na Bato Elementary School
- Mataas Na Pulo Elementary School
- Maugat Elementary School
- Nasugbu Christian Faith Academy
- Nasugbu East Central School
- Nasugbu West Central School
- Natipuan Elementary School
- Nicolites Montessori School
- Paaralang Elementarya ng Banilad
- Pantalan Elementary School
- Panuca Elementary School
- Papaya Elementary School
- Pingkian Elementary School
- RBCordero Academy
- Tala Elementary School
- Tumalim Elementary School
- Utod Elementary School
- Wawa Elementary School

=== Secondary schools ===
- Balaytigue National High School
- Banilad National High School
- Bilaran National High School
- Bunducan National High School
- Catandaan Yabut National High School
- Dr. Crisogono B. Ermita Sr. Memorial National High School
- Kaylaway National High School
- Looc National High School
- Lumbangan National High School
- Malapad na Bato National High School
- Nasugbu East Senior High School
- Pantalan Senior High School
- Tala National High School
- Tala Senior High School
- Tumalim National High School

=== Higher educational institutions ===
- Batangas State University-Apolinario R. Apacible School of Fisheries
- Dr. Francisco L. Calingasan Memorial Colleges Foundation
- St. Paul Foundational Learning & Excellence Centre

== Transportation ==
Several bus services provide transportation to and from Nasugbu. Jeepneys from Tagaytay also enter and leave the town at a scheduled time. Within the town, tricycles are the main mode of transport.
