= Charlotteville, New York =

- hamlet
- Location within New York
- Coordinates: 42°32′43″N 74°39′53″W
- Country: United States
- State: New York
- County: Schoharie
- Elevation: 1,604 ft (489 m)
- Time zone: UTC-5 (Eastern (EST))
  - Summer (DST): UTC-4 (EDT)
- ZIP code: 12036
- Area code: 518
- GNIS feature ID: 946420

Charlotteville is a hamlet in the town of Summit, Schoharie County, New York, United States. Charlotteville is 8 miles (13 km) southwest of Richmondville. The community has a post office with ZIP code 12036.

The Bute-Warner-Truax Farm, which is listed on the National Register of Historic Places, is located in Charlotteville.
