= Padre Burgos =

Padre Burgos may refer to:

- José Burgos, a martyred Filipino Catholic priest
- Padre Burgos Avenue, a road in Manila, Philippines
- Padre Burgos, Quezon, Philippines
- Padre Burgos, Southern Leyte, Philippines
- Padre Burgos, a 1949 biographical film directed by Gerardo de León
