= GomBurZa (film) =

2023 historical biographical film by Pepe Diokno

- Theatrical release poster
- Directed by: Pepe Diokno
- Written by: Rodolfo C. Vera; Pepe Diokno
- Produced by: Pauline Mangilog-Saltarin; Ernestine Tamana
- Starring: Dante Rivero; Cedrick Juan; Enchong Dee
- Cinematography: Carlo Mendoza
- Edited by: Benjamin Tolentino
- Music by: Teresa Barrozo
- Production companies: Jesuit Communications; MQuest Ventures; CMB Film Services
- Distributed by: Solar Pictures
- Release date: December 25, 2023
- Running time: 112 minutes
- Country: Philippines
- Languages: Filipino; Spanish
- Box office: ₱53 million

GomBurZa is a 2023 Philippine historical drama film co-written and directed by Pepe Diokno. Starring Dante Rivero, Cedrick Juan, and Enchong Dee, it features and follows the lives of the Gomburza, three native Filipino Roman Catholic priests executed during the latter years of the Spanish colonial era in the Philippines.

Produced by Jesuit Communications, MQuest Ventures, and CMB Film Services, and distributed by MQ Worldwide and Solar Pictures, it serves as an official entry to the 49th Metro Manila Film Festival, garnering the most number of awards for that year, and was released in cinemas nationwide on December 25, 2023.

== Plot ==
During the Spanish colonization of the Philippines, secular priest Pedro Pelaez retells the story of Apolinario de la Cruz, a native who got executed by the Spaniards for founding a sect due to him being rejected for priesthood because of his race, to his student, Jose Burgos, and fellow secular priest Mariano Gomez. The trio fights the attempts by the friars from the religious orders led by Fr. Mosqueda to take over parishes administered by predominantly Filipino secular priests. Pelaez later dies in the 1863 Manila earthquake, while Burgos finishes his studies for the priesthood.

In 1869, Burgos is a teacher at the University of Santo Tomas and develops a close relationship with his students, Felipe Buencamino and Paciano Mercado. They rejoice at the arrival of the liberal Governor-General, Carlos Maria de la Torre, and Felipe and Paciano form a student association. However, they are disillusioned when Felipe is arrested, and Dela Torre tells Burgos to tone down his liberal advocacies in exchange for Buencamino's freedom.

In 1871, de la Torre is replaced by the repressive Rafael Izquierdo, who asks the friars about Burgos' activities. He also lifts tax exemptions for native soldiers at Fort San Felipe, prompting a failed mutiny the following year by Sergeant Fernando La Madrid, who had been paid to launch the rebellion by a group of radicalised Filipino elites through their intermediary, Francisco Zaldua. Gomez, Burgos and another priest, Jacinto Zamora, are arrested for their alleged involvement in the mutiny and are subjected to a hurried court-martial during which they are subjected to numerous judicial injustices. In contrast, the real instigators of the mutiny (excluding Zaldua) are sentenced to exile.

During the trial, Zamora suffers a nervous breakdown after a written invitation he made to a card game is misconstrued to be a letter about an arms delivery, while Gomez and Burgos denounce the trial as a sham as Zaldua, bearing signs of torture, falsely implicates Burgos in the mutiny. The three priests, along with Zaldua, are convicted and sentenced to death by garrote. After witnessing the course of the trial, Fr. Mosqueda realises that they have been used by the Spanish government to absolve itself of responsibility and voices regret at how history will blame them for their impending deaths.

Izquierdo requests that Manila Archbishop Gregorio Meliton Martinez strip the cassocks of the priests for their crimes, but the latter refuses, believing in their innocence and insisting that they will die as priests, and restores their cassocks, which had been confiscated during their arrest. Paciano, along with his brother Pepe, Felipe, and others, witness the execution at Bagumbayan. Zaldua is scorned by the crowd as a traitor as he is being executed. A catatonic Zamora is lifted to the scaffold, followed by a nonchalant Gomez, while Burgos, after accepting an apology from his executioner, protests his innocence as he is killed. The crowd kneels in grief over their execution as Archbishop Martinez lets the church bells toll for their deaths.

In an epilogue, an adult Pepe, also known as Jose Rizal, is shown dedicating his second novel, El Filibusterismo, to the three priests, and is executed in 1896 at the same place where they died, while a former servant of Fr. Mosqueda, who witnessed the execution of the three priests, joins the Katipunan in their fight for independence against the Spaniards.

== Cast ==
- Dante Rivero as Padre Mariano Gomez de los Ángeles: A member of the Gomburza.
- Cedrick Juan as Padre José Apolonio Burgos y García: A member of the Gomburza.
- Enchong Dee as Padre Jacinto Zamora y del Rosario: A member of the Gomburza.
- Ketchup Eusebio as Francisco Zaldúa: A civilian who is implicated and executed alongside the Gomburza.
- Piolo Pascual as Padre Pedro Peláez: The mentor of Padre Burgos.
- Elijah Canlas as Paciano Rizal Mercado y Alonzo Realonda: One of Padre Burgos's students and the older brother of José Rizal.
- Tommy Alejandrino as Felipe Buencamino: One of Padre Burgos's students.
- Jaime Fábregas as Gregorio Melitón Martínez, Archbishop of Manila
- Khalil Ramos as José Rizal: The younger brother of Paciano.
  - Alexandre Lucas Martín as young José Rizal (aged 10)
- Ronnie Lázaro as Francisco Rizal Mercado: The father of Paciano and José. Lázaro reprises his role in the 1998 film, José Rizal.
- Sue Prado as Teodora Alonso Realonda: The mother of Paciano and José.
- Neil Ryan Sese as Máximo Inocencio
- Epy Quizon as Joaquín Pardo de Tavera
- Brian Sy as Crisanto delos Reyes
- Paolo O'Hara as Antonio Regidor
- Bombi Plata as Enrique Paraiso
- Leo Rialp as Padre José Mosqueda
- Nanding Josef as Padre Miguel de Laza
- Arnold Reyes as Sergeant Fernando la Madrid
- Jomari Ángeles as Lt. Manuel Montesinos
- Giovanni Baldeserri as General Felipe Ginovés
- Carlos Siguion-Reyna as Bishop Francisco Gainza
- Jerry O'Hara as Bishop Romualdo Jimeno
- Kuya Manzano as Padre Tressera
- Jon Achaval as Padre Corominas
- Sheenly Gener as Zaldúa's wife
- Danna Simbre as Inocencio's wife
- Marco Lobregat as Carlos María de la Torre y Navacerrada
- Borja Saenz De Miere as Rafael Izquierdo y Gutiérrez
- Timothy Castillo as Sergeant Bonifacio Octavo
- DMs Boongaling as Recoleto main servant
- Gerardo Kaimo as Rafael Echague
- Dylan Ray Talon as “Hermano Pule” (real name: Apolinario de la Cruz)
- Gary Guarino as Andrés Bonifacio
- Floyd Tena as Executioner

== Production ==
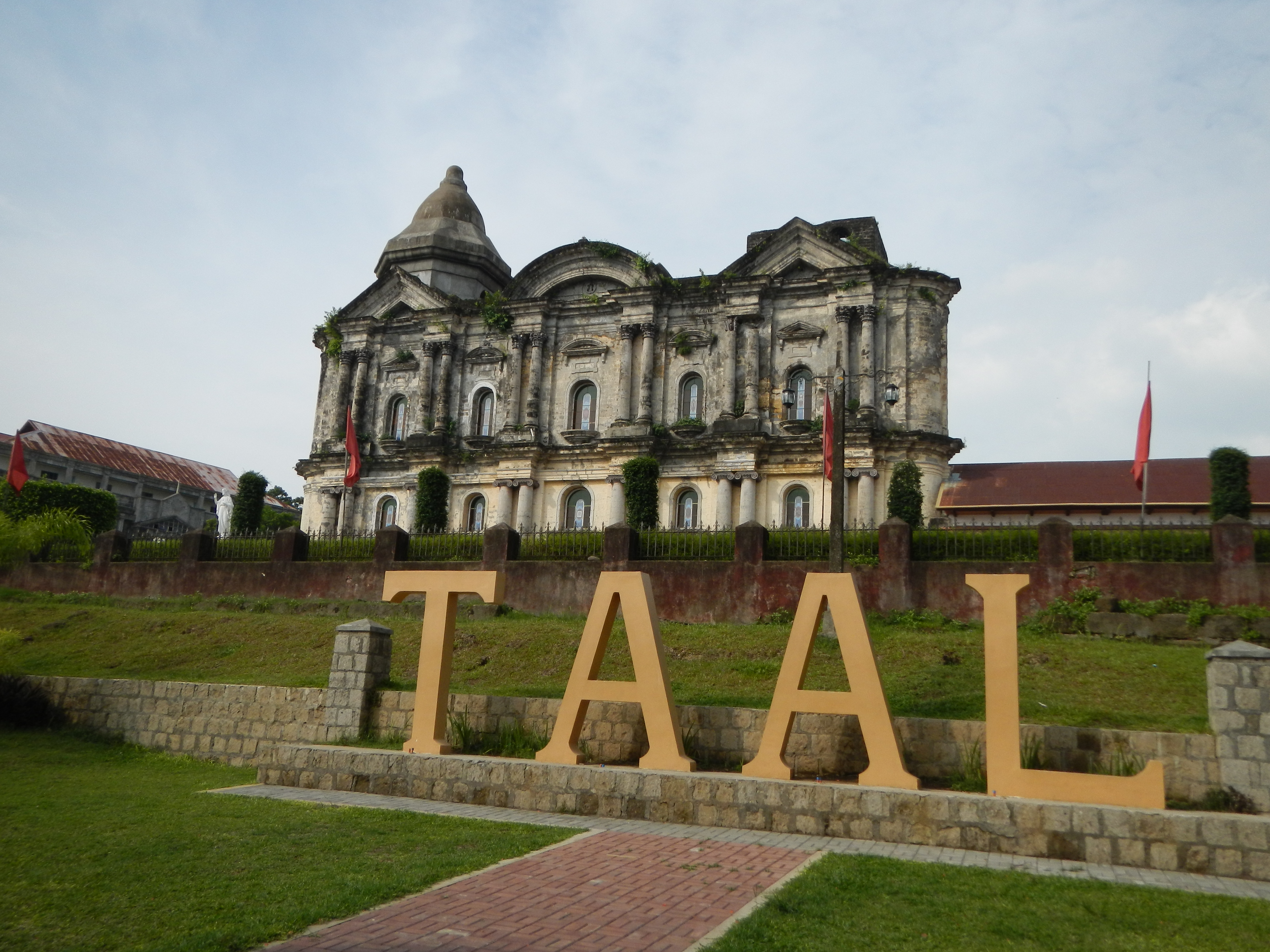
Taal Basilica, Batangas

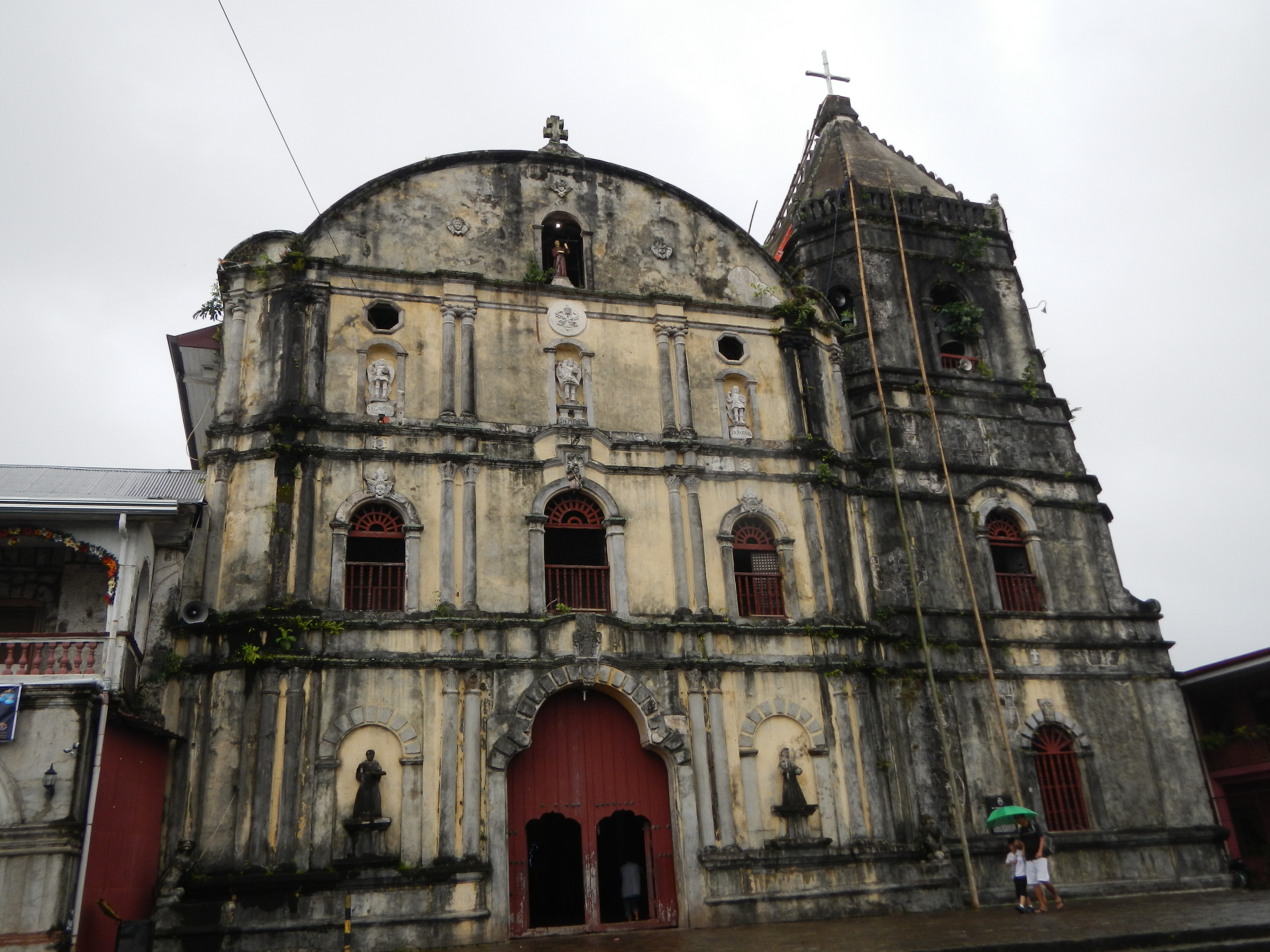
Tayabas Basilica, Quezon

Some filming locations of GomBurZa

GomBurZa was produced under Jesuit Communications and MQuest Ventures, in collaboration of CMB Film Services. Pepe Diokno is the director, who was motivated by patriotism to create the film.

The film focuses on the rise of the secularization movement led by Roman Catholic priest Pedro Pelaez in the Spanish Philippines as well as the struggles and execution of the eponymous trio priests, the Gomburza. This was his first historical film.

The production team said they gave focus on historical accuracy for GomBurZa. They coordinated with historians and the Jesuits in creating the film. Among them was Jesuit priest and Ateneo de Manila University professor René Javellana.

Director Diokno, however, added that they have to utilise some creative liberties to fill in the gaps, such as the portrayal of Francisco Zaldua, who was killed alongside the Gomburza, whose role in history is still debated.

Filming locations include Intramuros, Tayabas Basilica, and Taal Basilica. Several battle and prisons scenes were shot in Intramuros. Filming took 17 days to complete. The garrote scene was shot for one day in Tayabas. Diokno remarked that the weather coincided with their filming, as the clouds darkened and strong winds occurred in the afternoon Actors were also not allowed to work on another project during filming. Actors also had to learn Spanish, which Diokno found as a challenge in casting. In one scene, Piolo Pascual delivers a monologue in Spanish for around five minutes.

== Release ==
GomBurZa premiered in cinemas in the Philippines on December 25, 2023, as one of the official entries of the 2023 Metro Manila Film Festival.

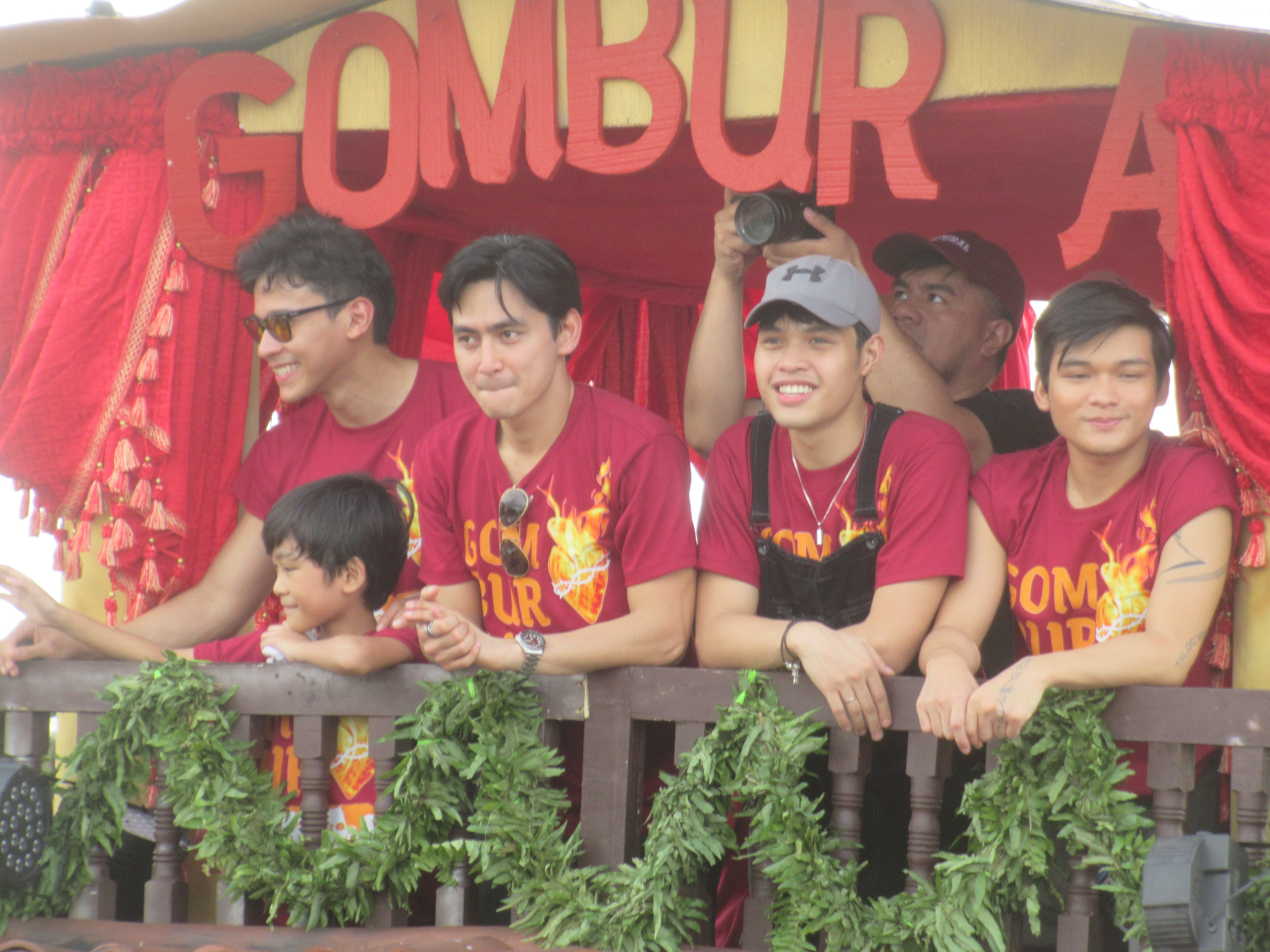
Float Parade of Casts

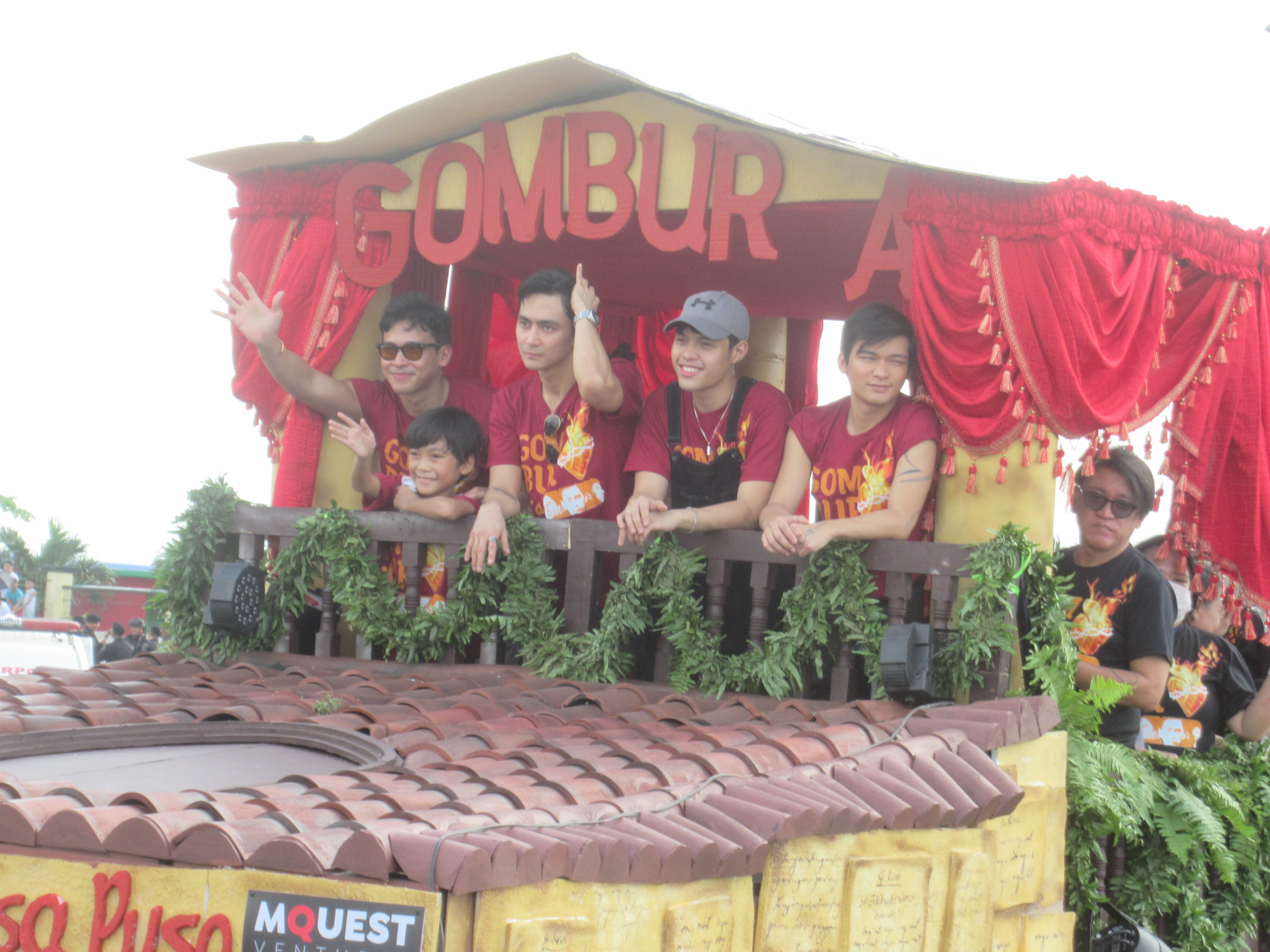
Float Parade of Stars

On April 9, 2024, GomBurZa was released on Netflix as the second entry from the 2023 Metro Manila Film Festival.

== Soundtrack ==
There are numerous theme songs in the movie. These are "Sa Duyan ng Bayan" by Noel Cabangon, Ebe Dancel and Gloc-9, "Gabing Kulimlim" by Rey Malipot and Bituin Escalante, and "Iyong Hilumin".

== Reception ==
=== Box office ===
GomBurZa ranked 4th in the box office sales for the 2023 Metro Manila Film Festival.

=== Critical reception ===
A 2025 study by Senior High School (SHS) students of De La Salle University revealed general acceptance among Baby boomers and Generation Z viewers on the film's dominant messages on injustice, nationalism, and resistance. Nicol Latayan of the International Cinephile Society notes that the film successfully manages to avoid portraying the Gomburza as heroes who should be worshipped, but instead shows them as catalysts that would spark change.

Lé Baltar of Rappler criticized the film's direction as replete with details and locations that, at times, end up uninterrogated, if not fly over one’s head. Stephanie Mayo of the Daily Tribune, meanwhile, believes that the film never deviates from its objective. Kristine Purnell of The Philippine Star saw balance in the film's treatment of its chosen themes, never coming to a point that it comes off preachy or self-righteous.

=== Accolades ===
Accolades received by GomBurZa
Award	Date of ceremony	Category	Recipient(s)	Result	Ref.
2023 Metro Manila Film Festival	December 27, 2023	Best Picture	GomBurZa	2nd	
2023 Metro Manila Film Festival	December 27, 2023	Best Director	Pepe Diokno	Won	
2023 Metro Manila Film Festival	December 27, 2023	Best Actor	Cedrick Juan	Won	
2023 Metro Manila Film Festival	December 27, 2023	Best Supporting Actor	Enchong Dee	Nominated	
2023 Metro Manila Film Festival	December 27, 2023	Best Supporting Actor	Dante Rivero	Nominated	
2023 Metro Manila Film Festival	December 27, 2023	Best Screenplay	Rodolfo Vera and Pepe Diokno	Nominated	
2023 Metro Manila Film Festival	December 27, 2023	Best Cinematography	Carlo Mendoza	Won	
2023 Metro Manila Film Festival	December 27, 2023	Best Production Design	Ericson Navarro	Won	
2023 Metro Manila Film Festival	December 27, 2023	Best Sound	Melvin Rivera and Louie Boy Bauson	Won	
2023 Metro Manila Film Festival	December 27, 2023	Best Visual Effects	Brian Galagnara, Danilo Handog, and John Kenneth Paclibar	Nominated	
2023 Metro Manila Film Festival	December 27, 2023	Gatpuno Antonio J. Villegas Cultural Award	GomBurZa	Won	
