= Pedro Pelaez =

Roman Catholic archbishop

Servant of God Pedro Peláez
- Reverend
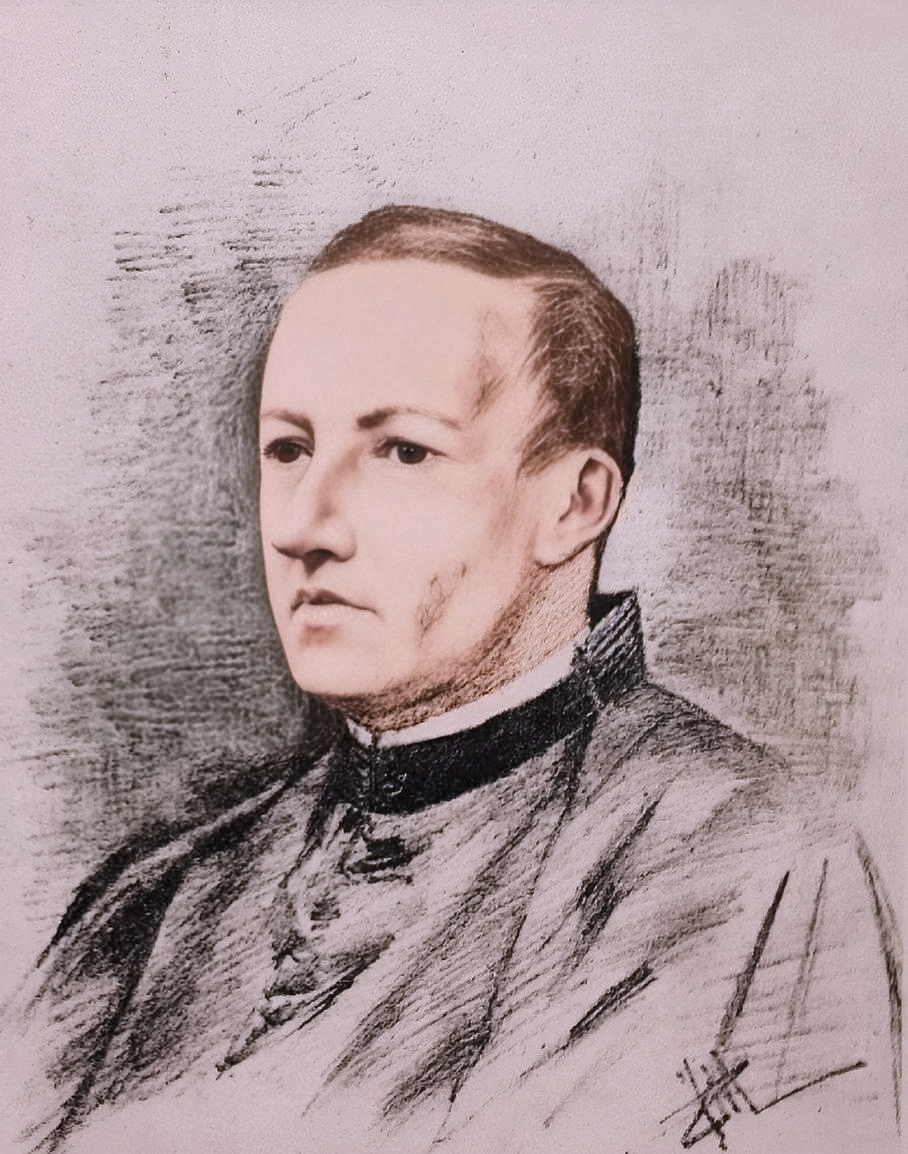
- An illustration of Peláez, from the encyclopaedia KASASAYAN: the Story of the Filipino People.
- Archdiocese: Archdiocese of Manila

Orders
- Ordination: 1837

Personal details
- Born: Pedro Pablo Peláez y Sebastián; June 29, 1812 Pagsanjan, La Laguna, Captaincy General of the Philippines
- Died: June 3, 1863 (aged 50) Intramuros, Manila, Captaincy General of the Philippines
- Denomination: Catholic
- Profession: Priest, Diocesan administrator, teacher
- Education: University of Santo Tomas
- Known for: Secularization of Catholic parishes, defense of Filipino clerical rights

Pedro Pablo Peláez y Sebastián (June 29, 1812 – June 3, 1863) was a Filipino Catholic priest who favored the rights for Filipino clergy during the 19th century. He was diocesan administrator of the Archdiocese of Manila for a brief period of time. In the early 19th century, Peláez advocated for the secularization of Filipino priests and is considered the "Godfather of the Philippine Revolution." His cause towards beatification has been initiated, and he is designated with the title "Servant of God."

== Life ==
Pedro Pablo Peláez was born on June 29, 1812, to José Peláez Rubio, the Spanish alcalde (mayor) of Laguna and his wife Josefa Sebastián, a Filipino from Manila. As was common custom, he was baptised for the day of his birth, which was the Feast of Saints Peter and Paul. When both of his parents died in 1823, he was taken in by Dominican friars in Manila, who sent him to study at the Colegio de San Juan de Letrán where he obtained a Bachelor of Arts degree. He then enrolled at the University of Santo Tomás to finish his studies for the priesthood. Among his professors was Francisco Ayala.

Peláez was ordained in 1837, and although he chose to be a secular priest, he kept close ties with the Dominicans all his life. A gifted theologian, he served at the Metropolitan Cathedral of the Immaculate Conception, and was sometime the Diocesan administrator of the Archdiocese of Manila.

From 1836 to 1839, he taught philosophy at the Colegio de San José, and later various subjects at his alma mater, the University of Santo Tomás, from 1843 to 1861.

== Defense of local clergy ==
In the mid-19th century, the Philippines was still a Spanish possession despite the empire losing territory to independence movements. Travel between the metropole and the colony became easier due to the 1859 opening of the Suez Canal. An increase of Peninsulares from the Iberian Peninsula threatened the secularization of the Philippine churches. In state affairs, Criollos, known locally as Insulares (lit. "islanders"), were displaced from government positions by the Peninsulares, whom the Insulares regarded as foreigners.

In 1849, a royal decree removed a few parishes from control of the secular clergy, which was mainly Filipinos, and gave those parishes to the Recollects and Dominicans. Peláez countered that these parishes had been successfully managed for the past eighty years, and the parishioners were happy. Along with Father Mariano Gómez, Peláez began organizing activities calling for the return of these churches to secular priests, considered among the first signs of Filipino nationalist awakening.

Seeking to have the royal decree withdrawn or amended, Peláez anonymously published a long formal protest titled El Clero Filipino (“The Filipino Clergy”) in the Spanish newspaper, El Clamor Público, in 1850. The seculars lost further parishes when the Jesuits returned to the Philippines in 1861 decades after their suppression and expulsion. Together with Francisco Gaínza, Peláez founded El Católico Filipino, the first Catholic newspaper in the Philippines. With his knowledge of canon law, Peláez wrote against this policy, criticising both secular and regular clergy, Spaniards or Filipinos when appropriate.

Peláez died in the collapse of the Manila Cathedral during the deadly 1863 earthquake in Manila.

== In popular culture ==
- Peláez was portrayed by Piolo Pascual in the 2023 period film, GomBurZa.

== See also ==
- List of Filipinos venerated in the Catholic Church
- Mariano Gómez
- Philippine revolts against Spain

== Sources ==
- Karnow, Stanley (1989). "Pedro Pelaez". In Our Image: America's Empire in the Philippines. Random House. ISBN 978-0394549750.
