= Jacinto Zamora =

Filipino Catholic priest

The Reverend Father Jacinto Zamora
- Church: Catholic Church

Personal details
- Born: August 14, 1835 Pandacan, Manila, Captaincy General of the Philippines, Spanish Empire
- Died: February 17, 1872 (aged 36) Bagumbayan, Manila, Captaincy General of the Philippines, Spanish Empire
- Denomination: Roman Catholic
- Parents: Venancio Zamora; Hilaria Zamora (née del Rosario)

Jacinto Zamora y del Rosario (August 14, 1835 – February 17, 1872) was a Filipino Catholic priest, part of the Gomburza, a trio of priests who were falsely accused of mutiny by the Spanish colonial authorities in the Philippines in the 19th century.

== Early life ==
Born on August 14, 1835, to Venancio Zamora and Hilaria del Rosario, he began his early education in Pandacan and later at the Colegio de San Juan de Letran. He was classified as a Filipino mestizo under the Spanish caste system prevailing at that time. He later transferred to the University of Santo Tomas after finishing his Bachiller en Artes. Zamora graduated on March 16, 1858, with the degree of Bachelor of Canon and Civil Laws. He became a student preparing for the priesthood in the Seminary of Manila.

== Pastoral life ==
After being ordained, Zamora handled parishes in Mariquina, Pasig, Mandaloyon (now Mandaluyong), San Pedro Macati (now Makati), Pasay, Muntinlupa, Las Piñas, and Batangas. He was also assigned to manage the Manila Cathedral on December 3, 1864.

Upon the refusal of fellow priest José Burgos to become a member of the Comision Permanente de Censura, Zamora, for unknown reasons, accepted the position in June 1869. The seculars had been occupying these parishes since fifty years prior, when there was a shortage of priests from Spain. Few of the Spanish priests like the idea of coming to the wilds of the Philippines, and the local church authorities were forced to train natives to become priests and administer the parishes. since then they were to be demoted to mere auxiliaries and sacristanes while the friars were to take over as heads of the parishes. In almost all instances, however, there was virtually no transfer of work: the native priests still carried on the actual work of the curas, while the friars, enjoying the privileges of curas, only took charge of the soft job of receiving the moneys due the curates from the parishioners. The archbishop, as head of the parishes, naturally sided with the seculars and warned that the controversy had better be resolved to their satisfaction if it was desired to stave off a deterioration of the situation with unfortunate results. Because the seculars were native priests, mestizos or creoles, and the regulars were peninsulars, the dispute over the parishes was eventually to take on racial overtones.

The Royal Order was issued to recompense the Recollects for loss of benefices in Mindanao which had been given to the Jesuits, just returned from exile.

The secular priests' reason is racial discrimination but the regular priests' (the Spanish priests that has joined a religious order such as the Franciscans or the Dominicans) reasons are; first, there are few secular priests and, second, the secular priests do not know all the things a priest must do.

However, they were limited to missionary work, and in the Islands were assigned to Mindanao, then in the administration of the Recollects. To compensate the Recollects, they were awarded the lucrative parishes in Manila and Cavite at the expense of the native clergy which had hitherto been holding them.

Despite the high score and passing of the test, Zamora was not given a permanent position on the grounds that he was just a "Indio".

Zamora joined the reform committee composed of the Filipino Liberals.

The reformist newspaper of El Eco Filipino became the organ of the champions for secularization of the churches and later of civil reforms. Burgos and his followers argued that the turning over of the parishes to the regulars contravened the provisions of the Council of Trent agreement which expressly prohibited the friars from holding curates. Under the Trent agreement, only secular priests were supposed to hold parishes and administer the spiritual needs of the populace while regulars were to live in their monasteries and devote their time to religious contemplation and to missionary and educational work.

Zamora he editor newspaper of La Integridad (the Integrity) to voice of Propaganda movement, law of degree against the Spaniards, that exposed the abuses of the liberal government secularization and the Colonizers of the Indios.

He is remembered for leading a campaign against the abusive Spanish friars and fighting for equal rights among priests. He is considered to be a true patriot in fighting against Spanish colonization.

== Death ==
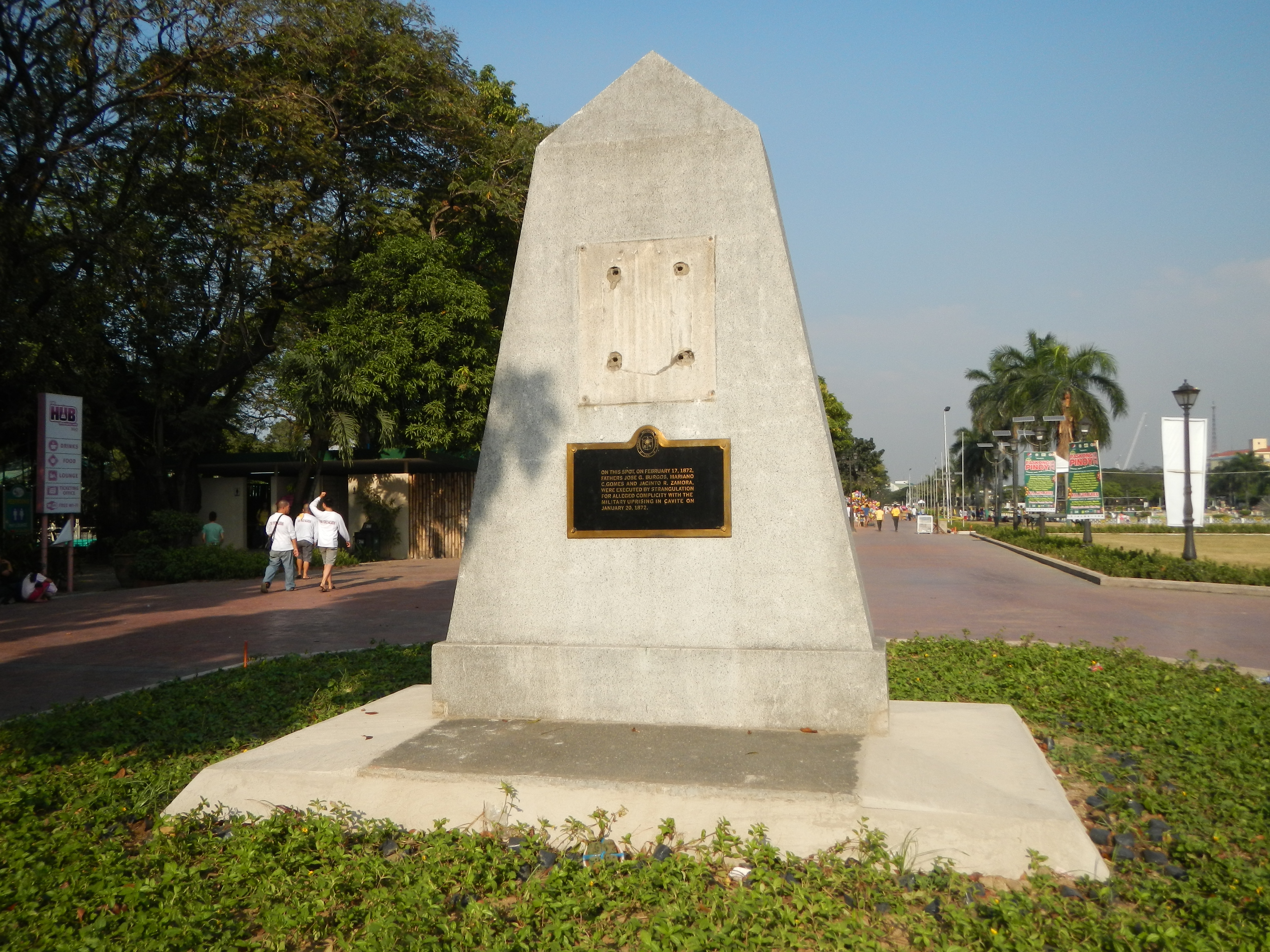
Execution site and marker of Gomburza

Zamora had a habit of playing cards after saying Mass. Once, he received an invitation stating that his friend had "Powder and Munitions"; in a gambler's language, "Powder and Munitions" meant that the player had much money to gamble with. This invitation fell into the hands of the Spaniards which coincided with the night of the Cavite mutiny led by a Filipino soldier, Sgt. La Madrid. This invitation was used by the Spaniards as evidence against Jacinto Zamora. The court accused them of inciting the revolt, even though the evidence was not adequate. They were found guilty and sentenced to death by garrote. The execution was carried out on February 17, 1872, at Bagumbayan Field in Manila. It has been said by the witnesses that Zamora was disoriented during his last days. As a result, he did not give any last words.

== In popular culture ==
- Portrayed by Bodie Cruz in the official music video of GMA Network's production of Lupang Hinirang in 2010.
- Portrayed by Dennis Marasigan in an episode of Bayani in 1996 and in the 2014 film, Bonifacio: Ang Unang Pangulo.
- Portrayed by Enchong Dee in the 2023 film, GomBurZa.

== See also ==
- Gomburza
- José Burgos
- Mariano Gomez
- Cavite mutiny
