= Mariano Gomez (priest) =

Filipino Catholic priest

The Reverend Don Mariano Gómes de los Ángeles Father of Bacoor
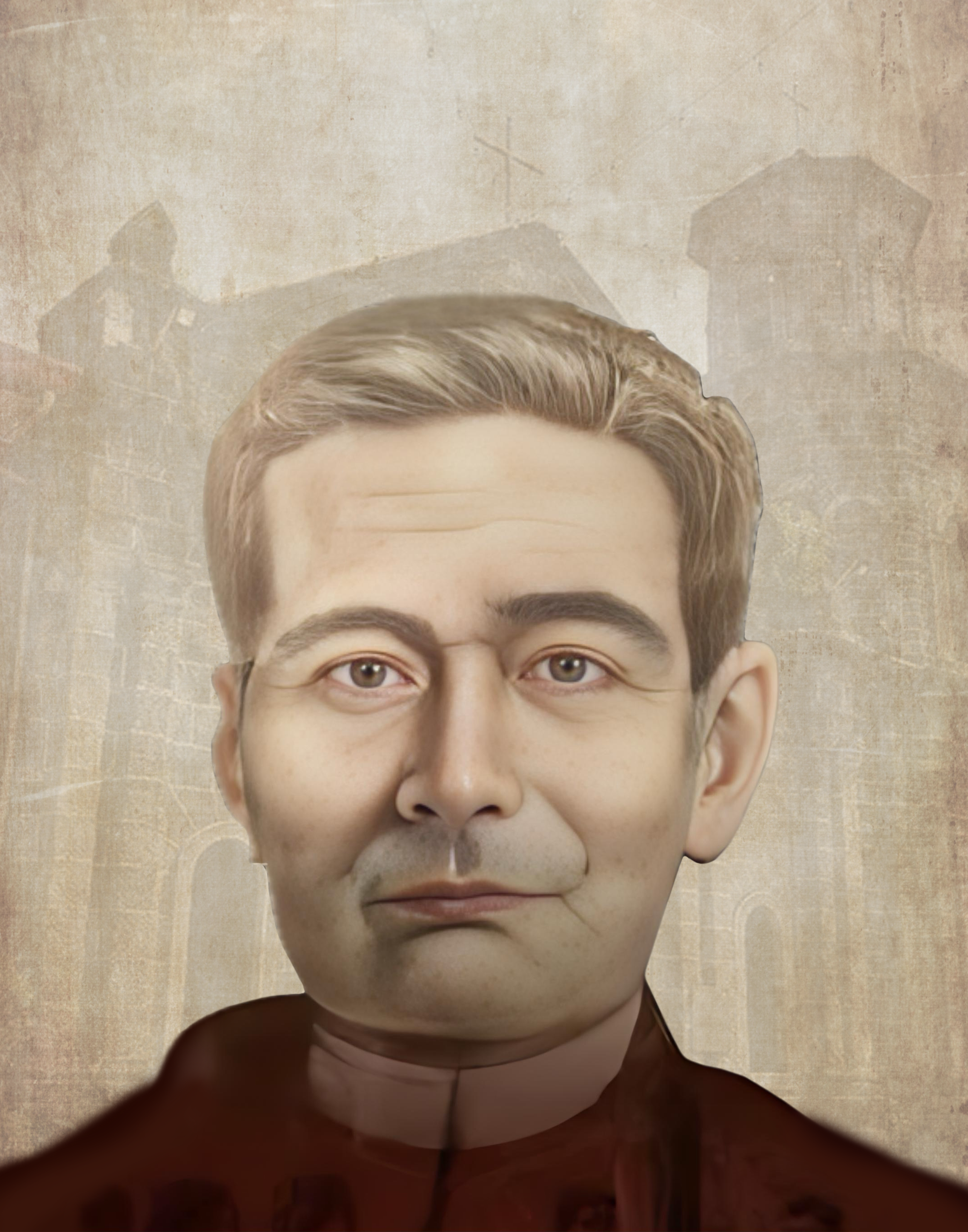
- An enhanced portrait of Fr. Mariano Gomez similar to the likeness of his 1923 and 2021 monuments in Bacoor, Cavite.
- Church: Catholic Church

Orders
- Ordination: 21 September 1822 by Fray Juan Antonio de Zulaybar, O.P.

Personal details
- Born: Mariano Gómez y Custodio; August 2, 1799 Santa Cruz, Manila, Captaincy General of the Philippines, Spanish Empire
- Died: February 17, 1872 (aged 72) Bagumbayan, Manila, Captaincy General of the Philippines, Spanish Empire
- Denomination: Roman Catholic
- Parents: Francisco Gómez; Martina Custodia
- Education: San Carlos Seminary; University of Santo Tomas

Mariano Gómes de los Ángeles (Spanish: [ˈmaˈɾjano ˈɣomes]; August 2, 1799 – February 17, 1872), often known by his birth name Mariano Gómez y Custodia or Mariano Gomez in modern orthography, was a Filipino Catholic priest who was falsely accused of mutiny by the Spanish colonial authorities in the Philippines in the 19th century. He was placed in a mock trial and summarily executed in Manila along with two other clergymen collectively known as the Gomburza. Gomes was the oldest of the three priests and spent his life writing about abuses against Filipino priests.

== Early life ==
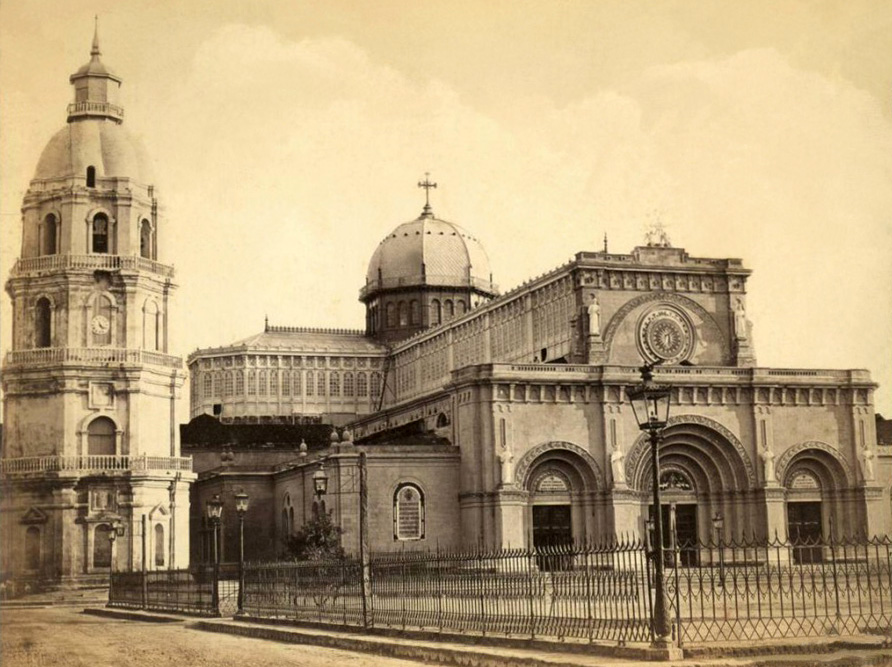
Fr. Gomes was appointed the sacristan of the Manila Cathedral in 1822

Gomes was born on August 2, 1799, in the suburb of Santa Cruz, Manila. He was a tornatrás, one born of mixed Austronesian, Chinese and Spanish ancestries. His parents were Don Alejandro Francisco Gómez and Doña Martina Custodia. After studying in the Colegio de San Juan de Letrán, he attended the University of Santo Tomás for degrees in Canon Law in 1818 and Sacred Theology in 1823. He was a student preparing for the priesthood in the San Carlos Seminary of Manila when he was assigned by the Archbishop to be its president in 1822. In the same year, he won the chaplainship of the Capellania of Doña Petrona De Guzman, which was a pious grant given to its chaplain for life in exchange of saying Masses for the soul and intentions of its foundress. He served faithfully as its chaplain until his death in 1872. As a deacon in 1822, he took the synodal examinations that allowed him to be appointed the sacristan of the Manila Cathedral in 1822. These three concurrent responsibilities of Fr. Gomes convinced the Archbishop to grant his confident application for ordination, giving him dispensation for being a year younger than the required age to be ordained to the priesthood on September 21, 1822. His first Mass was celebrated in his home parish in Santa Cruz.

== Assignment in Cavite ==
In 1824, the parishes of Biñan and Quiapo became vacant with the death of their parish priests. The young Fr. Gomes then took the required examinations in applying to be granted his own proprietary parish. He was within the top three of the examinees for the two parishes, but was not successful in winning either one. However, the parishes of Cavite el Viejo and Bacoor in Cavite soon had vacancies too with their respective parish priests winning the parishes from the previous examinations. He once again took the examination, and this placed him on the top spot and was granted the parish of Bacoor, Cavite. He took possession of his parish on June 2, 1824. In this capacity, he was appointed cura de propriedad, meaning his term as curate of Bacoor was for life. Knowing this, he took his entire family including his mother, his brother, and three sisters to Cavite as the position was permanent. Gomes also helped in maintaining a harmonious relationship among his other priests. He fought for equal rights for native priests against the abuses of their Spanish counterparts, founding the newspaper La Verdad (Spanish: "The Truth") to voice out their concerns and support for secularization.

As a parish priest, he was one of the active members of the secularization movement, working with Fr. Pedro Pelaez. They were vocal against the 1849 royal decree reassigning three (3) churches to the Recollects and four (4) to the Dominicans. Included in the list was the Church of Bacoor, which Fr. Gomes defiantly did not vacate. He also had a quarrel with a Recollect priest from Imus who tried to take four barrios from the territory of his parish. Fr. Gomes led the initiative to raise their concerns through the newspapers in Spain, receiving donated funds that came from priests in different provinces and Manila. The plea of Fr. Pelaez and Fr. Gomes was published in the Madrid newspaper El Clamor Público on March 8, 1850. This article defended the native clergy from false allegations, attested to their capabilities, and reiterated their loyalty to Spain. However, the progress of their efforts were suddenly affected by the death of Fr. Pelaez in the 1863 Manila Earthquake

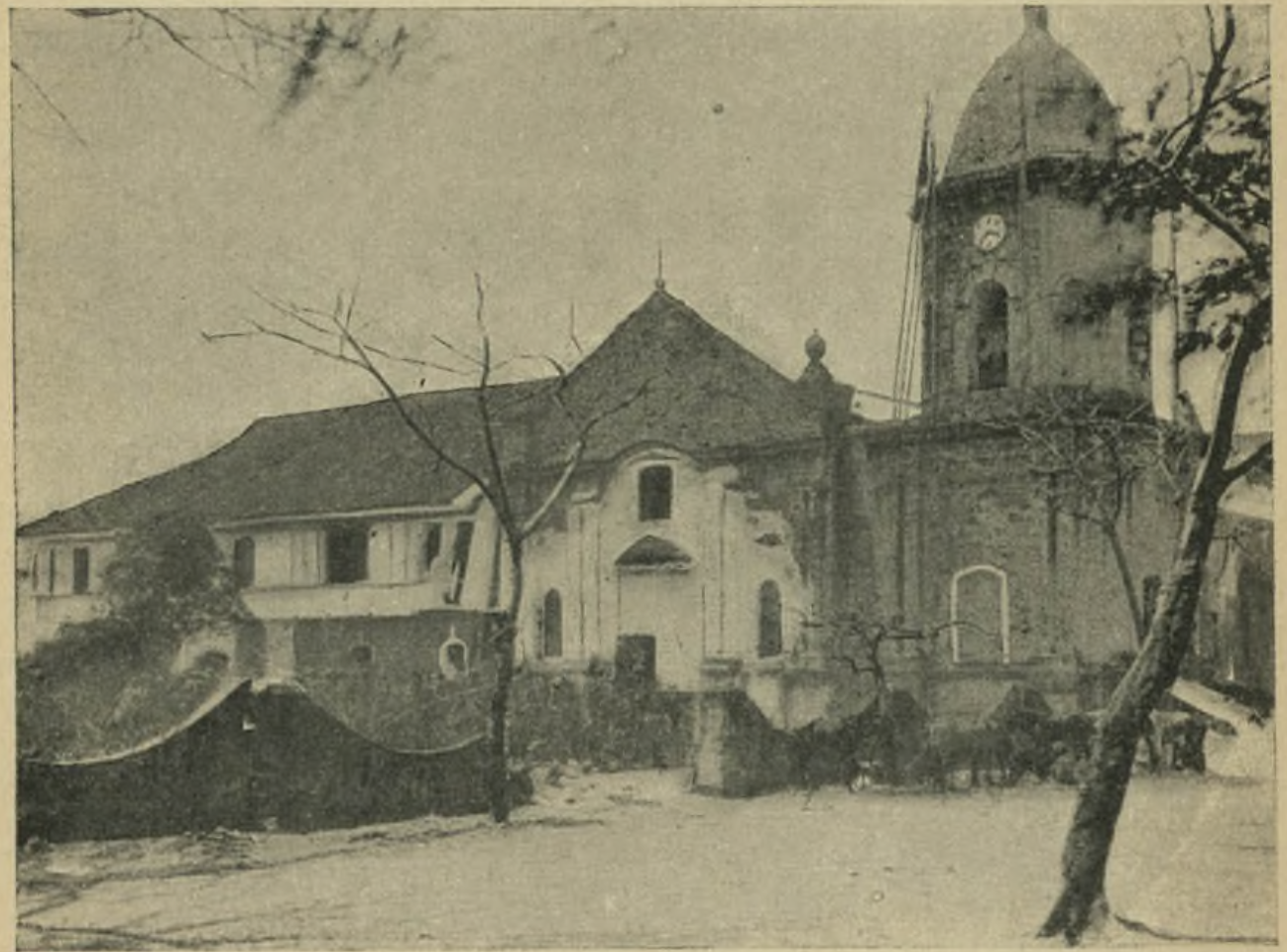
The original structure of Bacoor Church built under Fr. Gomes

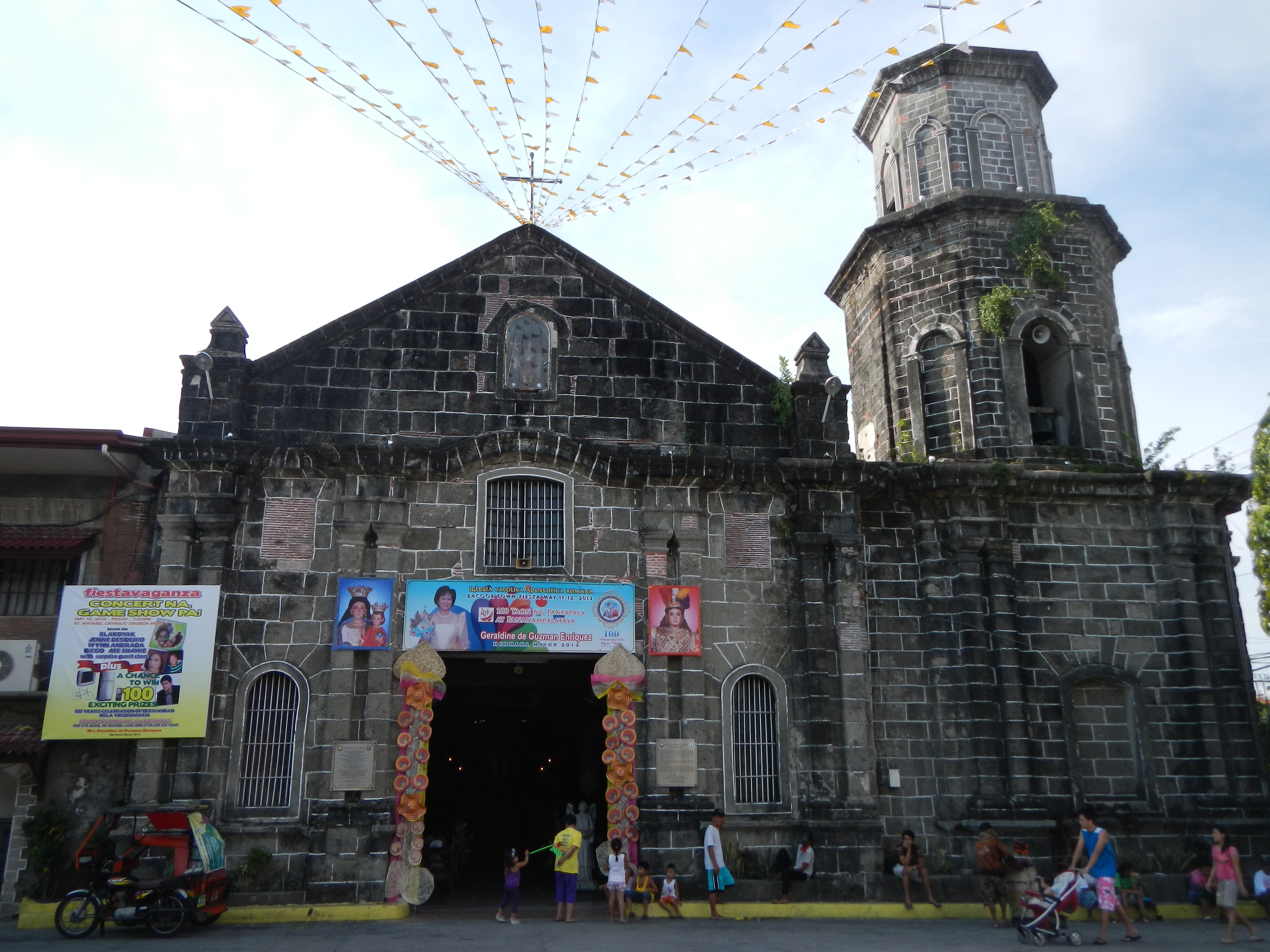
The current structure of Bacoor Church

In Bacoor, his most lasting project is the current structure of the Parish of St. Michael the Archangel which was originally facing the sea. Being a seaside town, it was decided to reorient the church inland to prevent the entry of sea water during high tides. For this, he worked with Felix Rojas, the architect who would later design the neo-Gothic church of Santo Domingo in Manila.

He was appointed permanent Vicar Forane of the Eccelesiastical Province of Cavite. This role led to him having regular correspondence with the Archbishop of Manila as he was responsible for the secular priests in the province. However, he was also reporting to the archbishop on matters of priest assignments, incident reports, requests from clergy, even that of the friars. Two of the parishes whose decrees of erection were relayed by him were the parishes of Bailen and Ternate, Cavite. As the parish priest of Bacoor, his responsibilities also extended to works of government, being the primary negotiator with the bandits led by Luis Parang in Bacoor, who were fighting due to friar abuses. His efforts led to the surrender of the bandits in 1828 and the subsequent "Tratado de Malacañang" where the Governor General of the Philippines granted them amnesty and concessions.

Fr. Gomes' work also extended to the livelihood of the people of Bacoor, where he taught them agricultural practices and salt-making. The salt industry of the town would be one of the biggest in the province well into the late 20th century. The reorganization of the roads of the town of Bacoor would be headed as well by Fr. Gomes, leading to the Spanish Governor of Cavite, Col. Juan Salcedo, praising this effort and the work that was done. Fr. Gomes was also very supportive of the Bacooreños' efforts to start businesses and industries such that he personally lent his own money to them.

=== Name change from Gómez to Gómes ===
When Gomes took up parochial work, he discovered that he shared the name "Mariano Gómez" with a Spanish friar in Cavite and a priest from Cabuyao, Laguna. So he changed his last name from Gómez to Gómes, with the change from the letter "z" to the letter "s" meant to reflect his being Tagalista, meaning he was proficient in the Tagalog language. He also appended the honorific "de los Ángeles" ("of the Angels") to his surname as he was born on the feast of Our Lady of the Angels, August 2.

As such, his name formally became "Mariano Gómes de los Ángeles," and he signed his name "Mar Gómes de los Ángeles." This was the name he officially signed in his last will and testament.

== Arrest and death ==
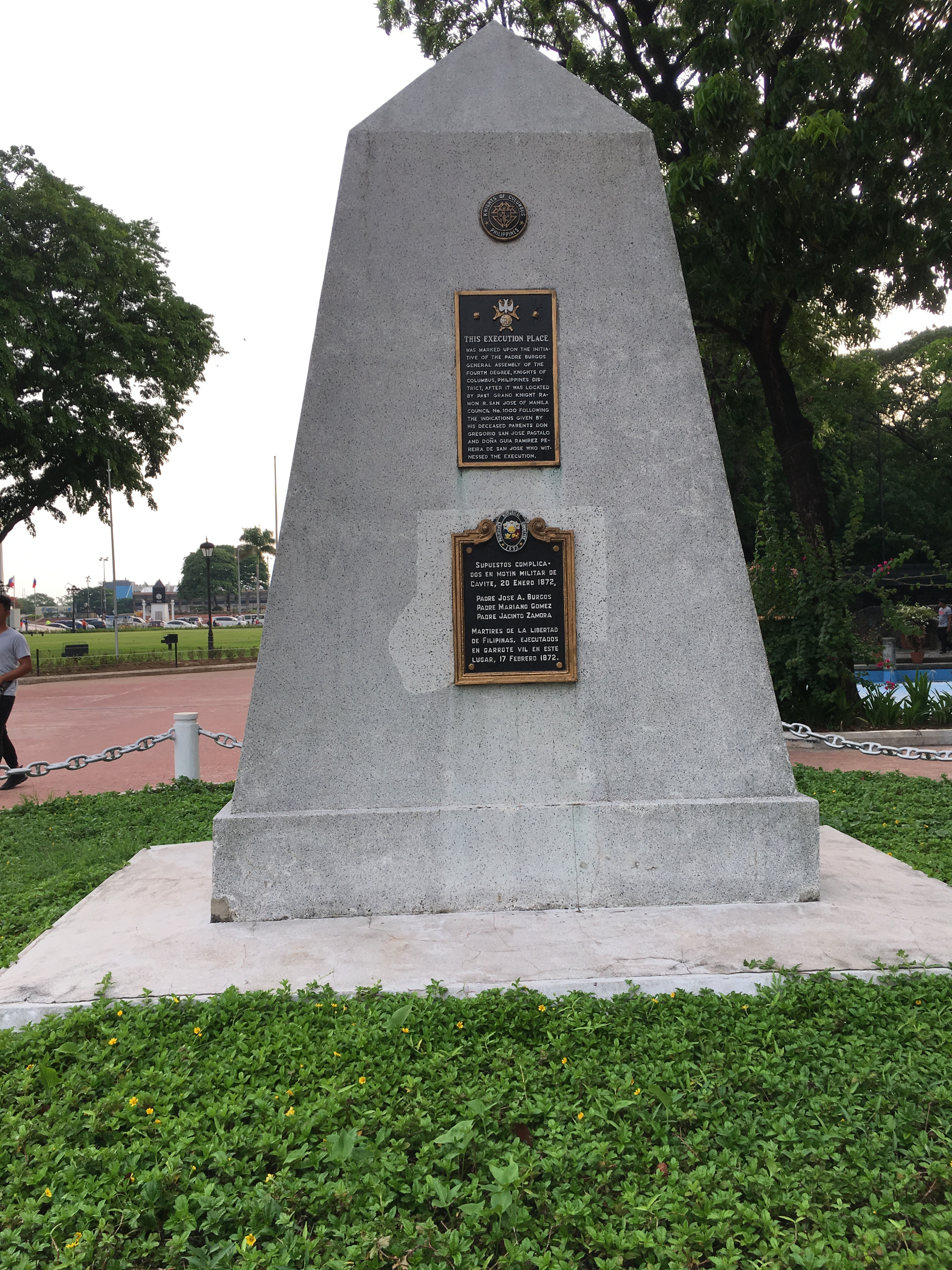
Historical marker of the Gomburza execution site at Luneta

Gomes was accused of treason, sedition, and taking active part in the Cavite mutiny of 1872. He was arrested in the convent of Bacoor together with his nephew, Fr. Feliciano Gomez, who had been staying with his uncle due to dysentery. At the time of his arrest, the people of Bacoor converged onto the convent to rescue their beloved priest, bringing bolos with them with a threatening attitude towards the arresting soldiers and blocking the carriage with arms crossed. The calm and peaceful character of Fr. Gomes emerged and, knowing the faithful obedience of his flock, said to the townspeople, "Hijos míos, no perdáis el juicio, retirad a vuestras casas que yo volveré pronto" (My children, do not lose your senses. Retire to your homes, and I will return soon). The people of Bacoor followed submissively his simple words as they had done for 48 years. He never returned to Bacoor again.

He was sent to jail along with Joaquín Pardo de Tavera, Máximo Paterno, and the secular priests José Burgos and Jacinto Zamora. Governor-General Rafael de Izquierdo requested the Archbishop of Manila Meliton Martinez to strip the priests of their cassocks. However, the Archbishop defied him and gave back the priests their cassocks as a symbol of their priesthood and innocence even in death. The three priests were executed by garrote on February 17, 1872, at Bagumbayan field; and have been known since then by the acronym composed of their collective surnames – Gomburza. The Archbishop ordered the bells in Manila to be tolled in sorrow for their execution. The three martyr-priests were buried together in the Paco Cemetery. At the age of 72, he was the oldest of the three priests.

After his death, his coadjutor Fr. Cornelio Ignacio primarily ministered to his parish in Bacoor until his close friend, the Augustinian Recollect Fray Juan Gómez took over as parish priest. According to his last will, Fray Gómez was Fr. Gomes' friend and his confessor. Despite the Recollect takeover, the secular Fr. Ignacio remained as coadjutor. The position of Vicar Forane of Cavite was soon given to the Recollect parish priest of Imus, Fray José Varela. Bacoor would be held by the Recollect friars until the Philippine Revolution, after which it was returned to the secular clergy.

== Legacy ==
The people of Bacoor would dedicate a monument to him in the town plaza on May 8, 1923, which is the Feast of the Apparition of St. Michael at Mount Gargano. This was erected through public subscription through the efforts of the monument committee led by parish priest of Bacoor, Fr. Gregorio Florencio. Multiple national and local officials financially contributed to this monument, including then-Senate President Manuel Quezon, then-House Speaker Sergio Osmeña, and former president and revolutionary leader, Emilio Aguinaldo

In 1972, as part of the centennial commemoration of the martyrdom of the Gomburza, the National Historical Commission of the Philippines presented a marker in his honor to the town of Bacoor through its municipal mayor, and his great grand-nephew, Pablo Gomez Sarino. A replica of the Gomburza National Monument in Manila was supposed to be received by Bacoor but never materialized. The 1972 historical marker would later be replaced in 2021 with an expanded text and a bust monument in front of the church convent.

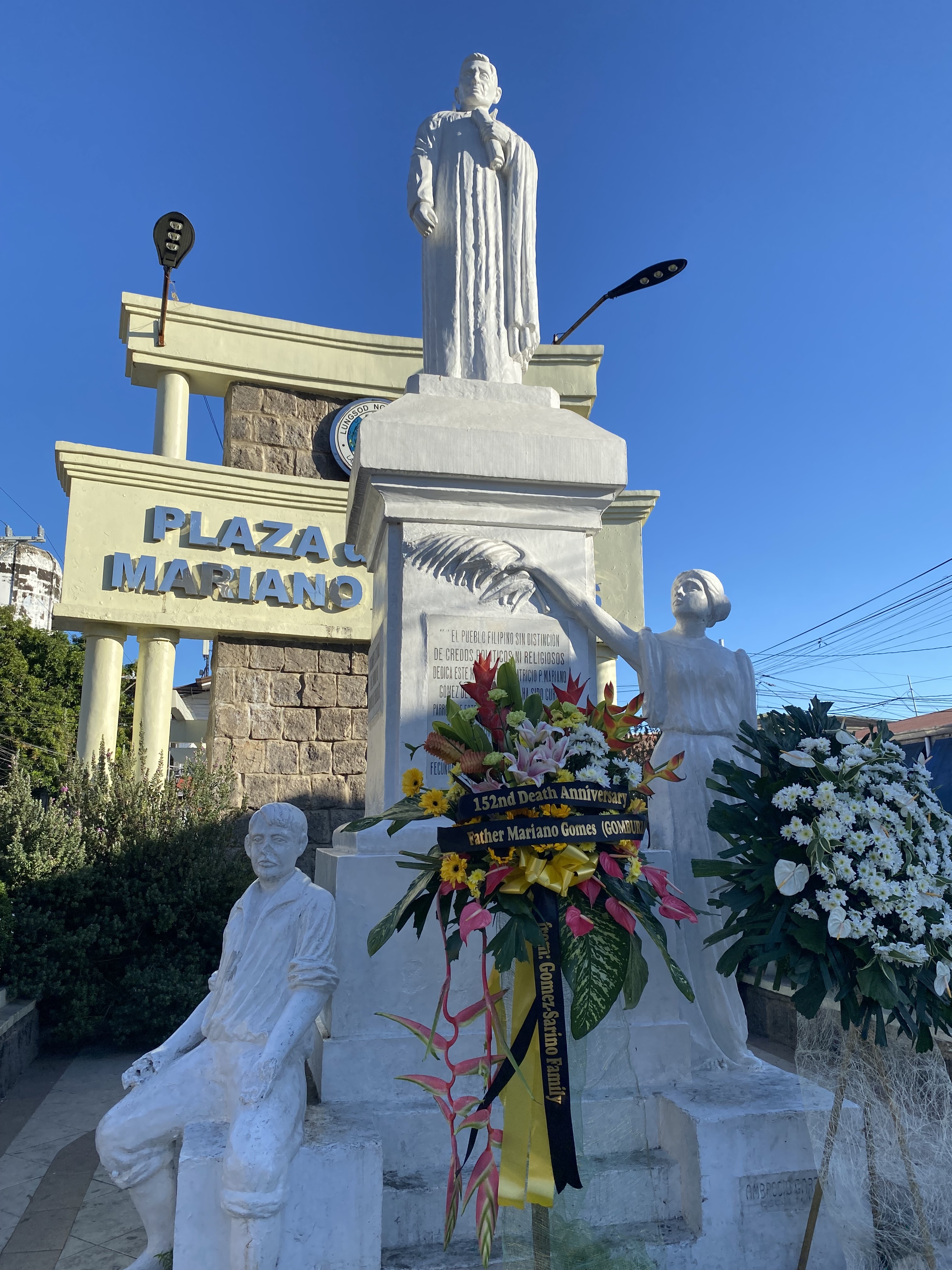
The 1923 monument for Fr. Mariano Gomes in the town plaza of Bacoor

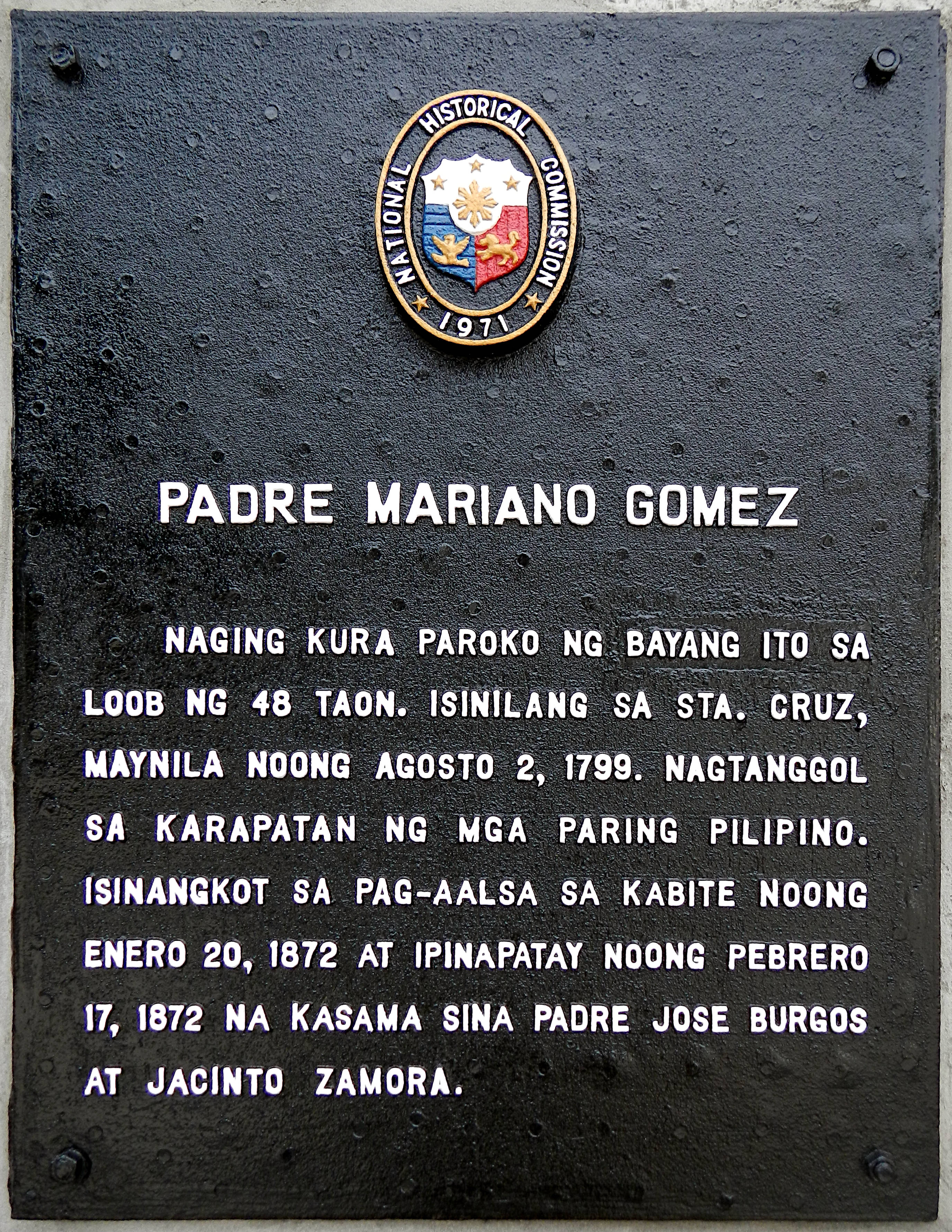
The 1972 historical marker presented during the Gomburza Centennial commemoration

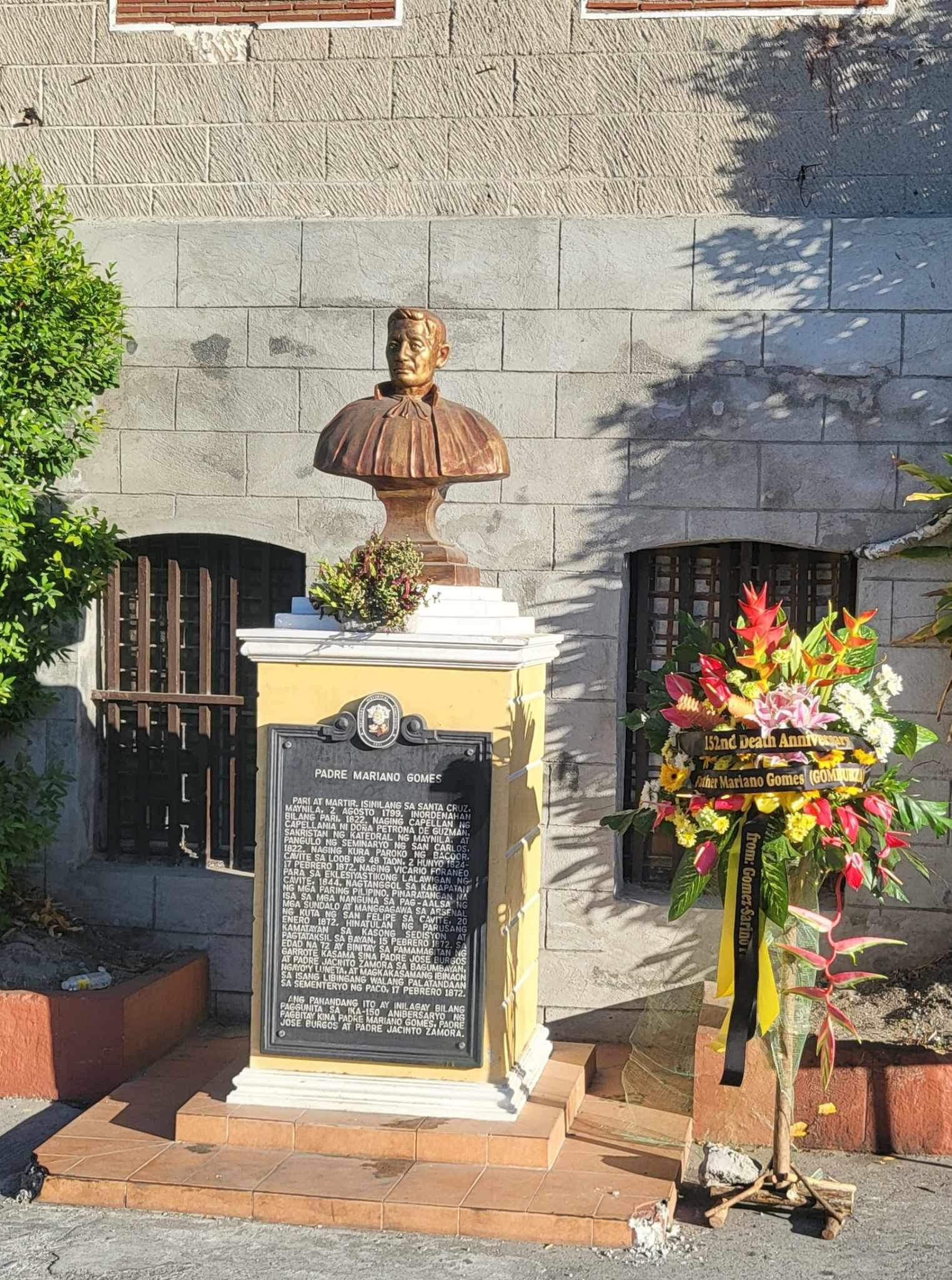
The 2021 Bust Monument of Fr. Mariano Gomes in the Bacoor Church grounds

The Bacoor National High School-Annex in the town proper was later renamed Mariano Gomes National High School in 2023.

== Personal life ==
With his parochial assignment, Fr. Gomes moved to Cavite Province together with his siblings and mother. He had one brother, José, and three sisters: Maria Dolores, Paula, and Tomasa. José Gómez and Tomasa Gómez settled in Bacoor, while Maria Dolores was known to have married José Trias of San Francisco de Malabon (now General Trias, Cavite). His only brother José, baptized José de la Cruz Gómez, was the father of Padre Feliciano Gómez, a fellow secular priest who was recorded to have been arrested with him in 1872. His sister, Tomasa, married Domingo de Cuenca who also hailed from the same town of Bacoor with whom she had daughters. He had another priest-nephew, Padre Manuel Trias, through his sister, Maria Dolores. Fr. Trias was the celebrant of the Mass in San Francisco de Malabon on June 12, 1898 when the Marcha Nacional Filipina was first played publicly as the elevation hymn, replacing the Spanish Marcha Real. According to Fr. Gómes' last will, he also revealed that he had a son prior to his ordination named Modesto De La Torre, who was known until then as his nephew.

Fr. Gomes' family ties in the province would later connect him by blood to other prominent Caviteños. Two of these, Gen. Mariano Trias (1868-1914), the 1st Vice President of the Philippines, and Rafael F. Trias, former Governor of Cavite, were the direct grandson and great-grandson of his sister Maria Dolores. As for his beloved town, he was the uncle of the gobernadorcillo of Bacoor in 1881 and 1890, D. Epifanio Gómez, and the great-granduncle of Mayor Pablo Gomez Sarino (1911-1987), the longest serving mayor of Bacoor, who were the son and direct great-grandson of his brother José, respectively. Mayor Sarino would lead the Gomburza Centennial Celebrations and Fr. Gomes' birth anniversary in Bacoor in 1972

== In popular culture ==
- Portrayed by Koko Trinidad in an episode of Bayani in 1996
- Portrayed by Victor Aliwalas in the official music video of GMA Network's production of Lupang Hinirang in 2010.
- Portrayed by Rommel Padilla in the 2014 film, Bonifacio: Ang Unang Pangulo.
- Portrayed by Dante Rivero in the 2023 film, GomBurZa.

== See also ==
- Gomburza
- José Burgos
- Jacinto Zamora
- Cavite mutiny
