= Gomburza =

Group of three Filipino martyred priests

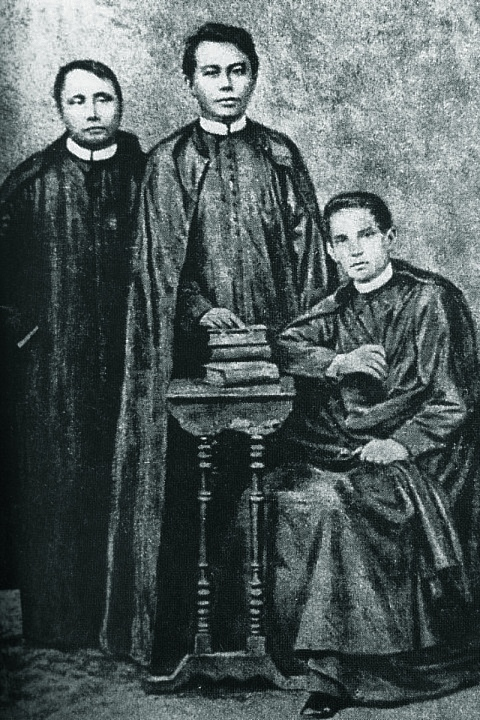
Mariano Gómes, José Burgos, and Jacinto Zamora

Gomburza, alternatively stylized as GOMBURZA or GomBurZa ("Gom" for Gómes, "Bur" for Burgos, and "Za" for Zamora), refers to three Filipino Catholic priests, Mariano Gómez, José Burgos, and Jacinto Zamora, who were executed by a garrote on February 17, 1872, in Bagumbayan, Philippines by Spanish colonial authorities on charges of subversion arising from the 1872 Cavite mutiny. The name is a portmanteau of the priests' surnames.

Gomburza incurred the hatred of Spanish authorities for fighting for equal rights among priests and leading the campaign against the Spanish friars. They fought on the issues of secularization in the Philippines that led to the conflict of religious and church seculars.

Their execution had a profound effect on many late 19th-century Filipinos; José Rizal, later to become the country's national hero, would dedicate his novel El filibusterismo to their memory. Mutiny by workers in the Cavite Naval Yard was the pretext needed by the authorities to redress a perceived humiliation from the principal objective, José Burgos, who threatened the established order.

Burgos was a Doctor of Philosophy and Arts whose prominence extended even to Spain, such that when the new Governor and Captain-General Carlos María de la Torre arrived from Spain to assume his duties, he invited Burgos to sit beside him in his carriage during the inaugural procession, a place traditionally reserved for the archbishop and who was a Peninsular Spaniard. The arrival of the liberal de la Torre was opposed by the ruling minority of friars, regular priests who belonged to an order (Dominicans, Augustinians, Franciscans, etc.) and their allies in civil government. It was supported by the secular priests, most of whom were mestizos assigned to parishes and far-flung communities, who believed that the reforms and the equality that they wanted with peninsular Spaniards were finally coming. Not all orders opposed nativization like the Jesuits and Recollects; the Jesuits being suppressed in several European empires for their support of anticolonial Native Americans in the Paraguay Missions and the Recollects having given their parishes to native Filipinos when the Jesuits were expelled and Recollects transferring to former Jesuit territory in the Philippines. In less than two years however, de la Torre was replaced by Rafael de Izquierdo.

== Background ==
Mariano Gómes de los Angeles was a well-known Roman Catholic priest during their time, part of the trio accused of mutiny by Spanish colonial authorities in the Philippines in the 19th century. Gómez was the child of Alejandro Francisco Gómez and Martina Custodia. He was born in the suburb of Santa Cruz, Manila on August 2, 1799. He was a Tornatrás, one born from mixed native (Filipino), Chinese, and Spanish ancestries. He studied at the Colegio de San Juan de Letrán and later studied theology at the University of Santo Tomas, preparing himself for the priesthood in the Seminary of Manila. Gómez was designated as the head priest of Bacoor, Cavite on June 2, 1824. He also taught for the agriculture and cottage industries aside from taking care of spiritual necessities. He fought for the rights of his fellow native priests against Spanish abuses. He was also active in the publication of the newspaper La Verdad. The publication served as the voice of Filipino Propaganda, where Law of High degree against the Spanish colonizers.

José Apolonio Burgos y García was born in Vigan, Ilocos Sur on February 9, 1837, and was baptized on the 12th of the same month. His parents were José Burgos, a Spanish lieutenant in the Spanish militia of Ilocos, and Florencia García, a native of Vigan. During his early teenage years, he studied at the Colegio de San Juan de Letrán and later went to the University of Santo Tomas, receiving a Bachelor of Philosophy in 1855, Bachelor of Theology in 1859, Licentiate in Philosophy in 1860, Licentiate in Theology in 1862, Doctor of Theology, and Doctor of Canon Law in 1868. He curated Parishes at Manila Cathedral and the Parish of St. Peter. The group's goal was to seek reforms, listed in Eco de Filipinas, which was published in Madrid. He founded the editor newspaper of La Nación (The Spanish Nation), this publication served when the voice of Filipino Propaganda was eagerly opposing the Spanish colonizers.

Jacinto Zamora y del Rosario was born on August 14, 1835, in Pandacan, Manila. His parents were Venancio Zamora and Hilaria del Rosario. He studied at the Colegio de San Juan de Letrán and graduated with a degree of Bachelor of Arts. He later transferred to the University of Santo Tomas and obtained a degree of Bachelor of Canon and Civil Laws. He prepared for the priesthood in the Seminary of Manila. He had dreamt of becoming a priest at a young age. After being given ministerial and priestly authority, Zamora was able to establish parishes in Marikina, Pasig, Makati, Mandaluyong, San Juan del Monte, Pasay, Muntinlupa, Las Piñas Taguig and Batangas and was also assigned to oversee Manila Cathedral on December 3, 1864. The reformist newspaper of El Eco Filipino became the organ of the champions for secularization of the churches and later of civil reforms. Zamora he editor newspaper of La Integridad (the Integrity) to voice of Propaganda movement, law of degree against the Spaniards, that exposed the abuses of the liberal government secularization and the Colonizers of the Indios.

== Martyrdom ==
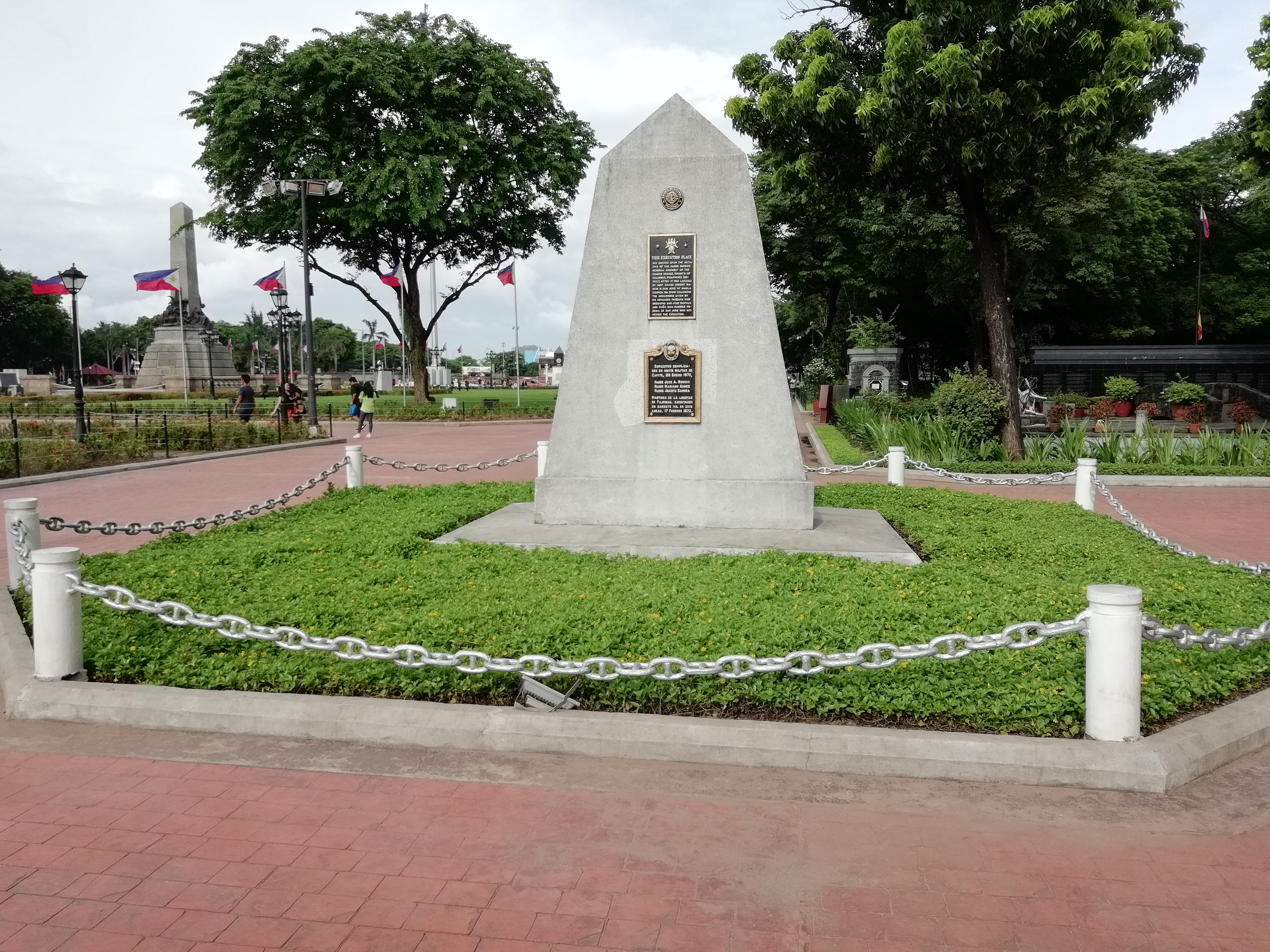
Monument marking the execution site of the Gomburza in Rizal Park

The execution of Gomburza remains one of the most controversial issues deeply embedded in Philippine history. However, their tragic end led to the dawn of Philippine Nationalism in the 19th century, intensified by Dr. José P. Rizal, in dedicating his second novel entitled El Filibusterismo which condemned the Spanish rule and the elite Filipinos. In his novel, Rizal wrote, "To the memory of the priests, Don Mariano Gómez (72 years old), Don José Burgos (35 years old), and Don Jacinto Zamora (37 years old). Executed in Bagumbayan Field on the 17th of February, 1872. The church, by refusing to degrade you, has placed in doubt the crime that has been imputed to you; the government, by surrounding your trials with mystery and shadows, causes the belief that there was some error committed in fatal moments; and all the Philippines, by worshiping your memory and calling you martyrs, in no sense recognizes your capability. In so far, therefore, as your complicity in the Cavite Mutiny is not proved, as you may or may not have been patriots, and as you may or may not cherish sentiments for justice and liberty, I have the right to dedicate my work to you as victims of the evil which I undertake in combat." However, Rizal's account was erroneous in detail as the execution took place on February 17, 1872, not on February 28, 1872, as Rizal mistakenly mentions. Additionally, the ages of the priests were listed inaccurately. At the time of the execution, Gómez was 72 years old, Burgos was 35 years old, and Zamora was 36 years old.

Their deaths were facilitated in a public execution at Bagumbayan (Luzon) using a garrote due to false accusations charged against them by Spanish authorities. Their alleged crimes included treason and sedition for being the supposed masterminds of the insurrection of Indios (native Filipinos) working in the Cavite arsenal. Furthermore, according to the Spanish military tribunal, they were believed to have been a part of a clandestine movement aimed at overthrowing the Spanish government, making them a threat to the Spanish clergy. The execution has since been labeled the Terror of 1872 and is recognized as a pivotal event contributing to the later Philippine Revolution from 1896 to 1898.

=== Historical times ===
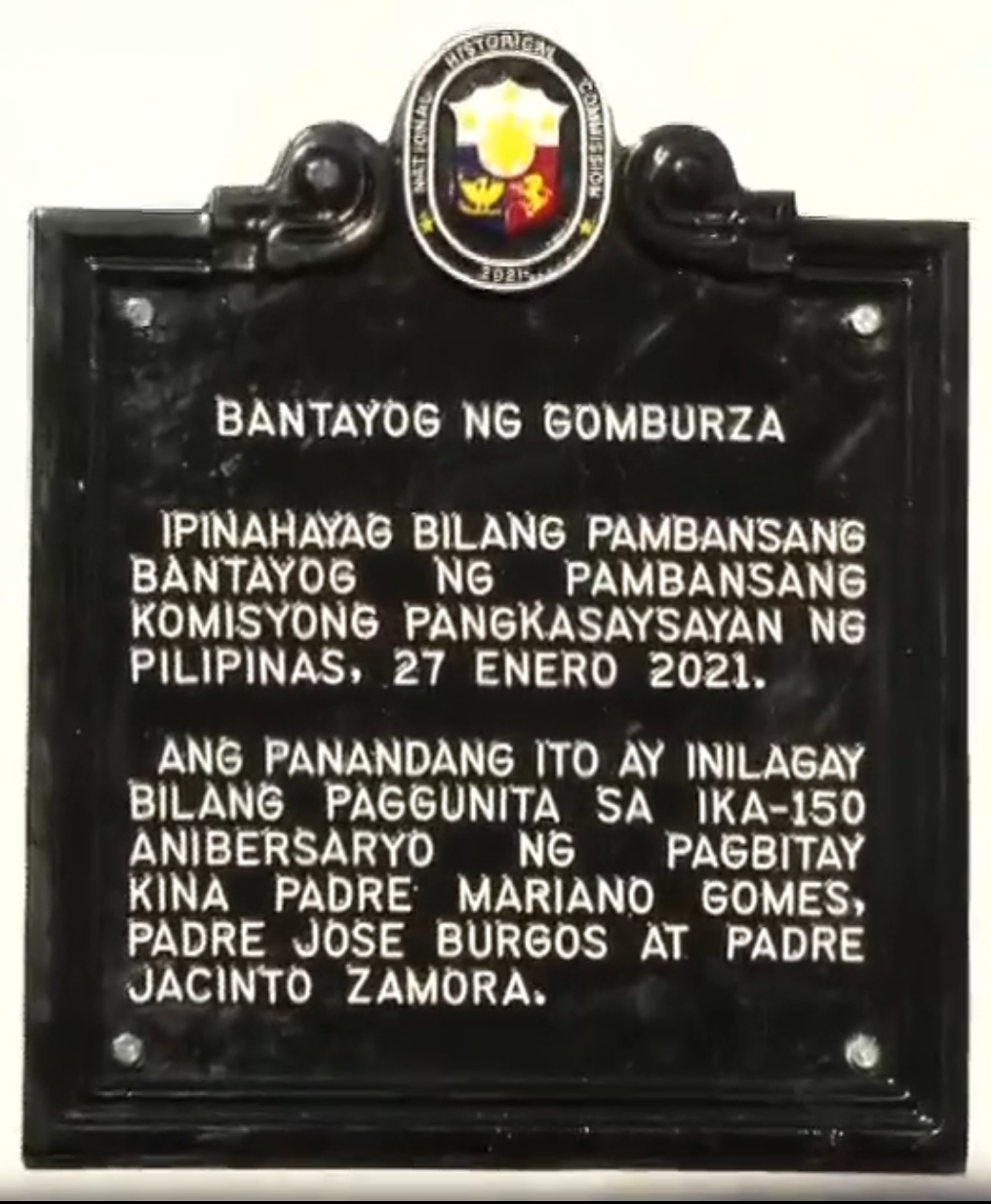
NHCP historical marker for the Gomburza National Monument in Manila

The Execution of Gomburza was documented by a Spanish historian named José Montero y Vidál who wrote the book, Historia General de Filipinas that centers on a Spaniard's perspective of the Cavite Mutiny. The inclusion of a biased story detailing the reasons for the execution of Gomburza later gained widespread criticism.

Vidal's account was corroborated by the then Governor-General Rafael Izquierdo y Gutiérrez. In his report, he narrated that the abolition of privileges enjoyed by the workers of Cavite arsenals caused the "revolution". He also blamed the media, specifically the Spanish press, regardless of democratic, liberal, or republican affiliation, for the circulation of unrestrained media. The latter is said to have featured propaganda such as overthrowing a secular throne, which allegedly inspired the Indios (native Filipinos) to organize the mutiny. General Izquierdo also mentioned the native clergy being a part of the rebels who were against the Spanish friars. The clergy supposedly wanted to end the hold of Spain over the Philippines to elect a new Harì who would rule the land and named Fathers José Burgos and Jacinto Zamora to be the ones responsible. The accounts of these two Spaniards supported one another, thus pointing to a planned conspiracy among educated leaders, mestizos, abogadillos, Manila and Cavite residents, and native clergy. Furthermore, on June 20, 1872, the patronal feast of Our Lady of Loreto was celebrated in the district of Sampaloc, and had a traditional fireworks display. However, according to Izquierdo and Vidál, the fireworks misled those in Cavite, causing them to attack Spanish officers, fulfilling republican wishes to eradicate the Spanish presence. There was also a mass murder of friars, which made the arrest of Gomburza legal. Through a quick court trial, they were sentenced to death by strangulation.

However, much speculation arose with their swift end that stirred the public, with some of the controversies published by the Philippine News Agency. The reports stated that the Spanish prosecutors bribed a witness to testify against the three priests who were charged with sedition and treason, which led to their death by garrote. Moreover, according to Edmund Plauchut, as quoted by Jaime Veneracion, late on the night of February 15, 1872, the three priests were found guilty of treason as instigators of mutiny in the Cavite Navy yard and were sentenced to death by Spanish Court martial. The judgement of the court was read to the priest in Fort Santiago the next morning, and they were told that they would be executed the following day (February 17, 1872). After they heard the sentence, Burgos broke into sobs, Zamora lost his mind and never recovered it, and only Gómez listened impassively.

Almost forty thousand Filipinos, who were at different places surrounding the platform, witnessed the execution of the Filipino priest and saw Saldua (the artilleryman who testified for the conviction of the priest). Gómes was the first of the three to be executed, witnesses describe him as calm and composed, accepting his death with dignity. His last words were: "Father, I know that not a leaf falls to the ground but by the will of God. Since He wills that I should die here, His holy will be done." Zamora was second to face execution and had already lost his mind, most regarded him as dead before even being executed. Last was Burgos, the youngest of the three, Burgos was deeply distressed and reportedly shed tears of anguish as he faced his execution. He is reported to have shouted his innocence prompting his confessor, a Recollect priest to calm him down saying that "Even Christ was innocent". The bells of Manila Cathedral tolled mournfully after the death of the three priests as ordered by Archbishop Melitón Martínez, who also believed in the innocence of the three.

Nonetheless, Dr. Trinidad Hermenegildo Pardo de Tavera, a Filipino scholar and researcher, informed the world of the Filipino side of the controversy. According to him, it was a mere mutiny by the laborers of the Cavite arsenal for their dissatisfaction with the abolition of their privileges due to the orders of General Izquierdo on January 20, 1872. About 200 men, including soldiers, laborers, and residents of Cavite, headed by Sergeant Lamadrid, assassinated all Spanish officers in sight, including the commanding officer. But then, Gen. Izquierdo, along with the friars, exaggerated the event to alarm the Spanish Government in order to delay installing reforms for the native Filipinos. Such reforms included the establishment of a school of arts and trades, which aimed to improve the education of Filipinos but would mean that the friars would lose their power in the government. Gen. Izquierdo took advantage of the event to instill fear in the minds of native Filipinos. Unfortunately, the Spanish Government in Spain relied on the report of Gen. Izquierdo and made no more attempts to investigate the issue. They believed that the said movement was indeed a big and well-planned conspiracy to dissolute the Spanish Sovereignty in the Philippines.

== Cavite mutiny ==
The so-called Cavite Mutiny of workers in the arsenal of the naval shipyard over a pay reduction produced a witness willing to implicate the three priests, each of whom was summarily tried and sentenced to death by garrote on February 17, 1872. The bodies of the three priests were buried in a common, unmarked grave in the Paco Cemetery, in keeping with the practice of burying enemies of the state. Notably, in the archives of Spain, there is no record of how Izquierdo, a liberal, could have been influenced to authorize these executions. Gregorio Melitón Martínez, Archbishop of Manila (who had also ordained Saint Ezequiél Moreno y Díaz), refused to defrock the priests, as they did not break any canon law. He ordered the bells of the cathedral and every church to be rung in honor of the executed priests, this had such an effect on the future Philippine hero José Rizal who was a witness to their execution. The aftermath of the investigation produced scores of suspects, most of whom were exiled to Guam in the Marianas.

== Remains ==
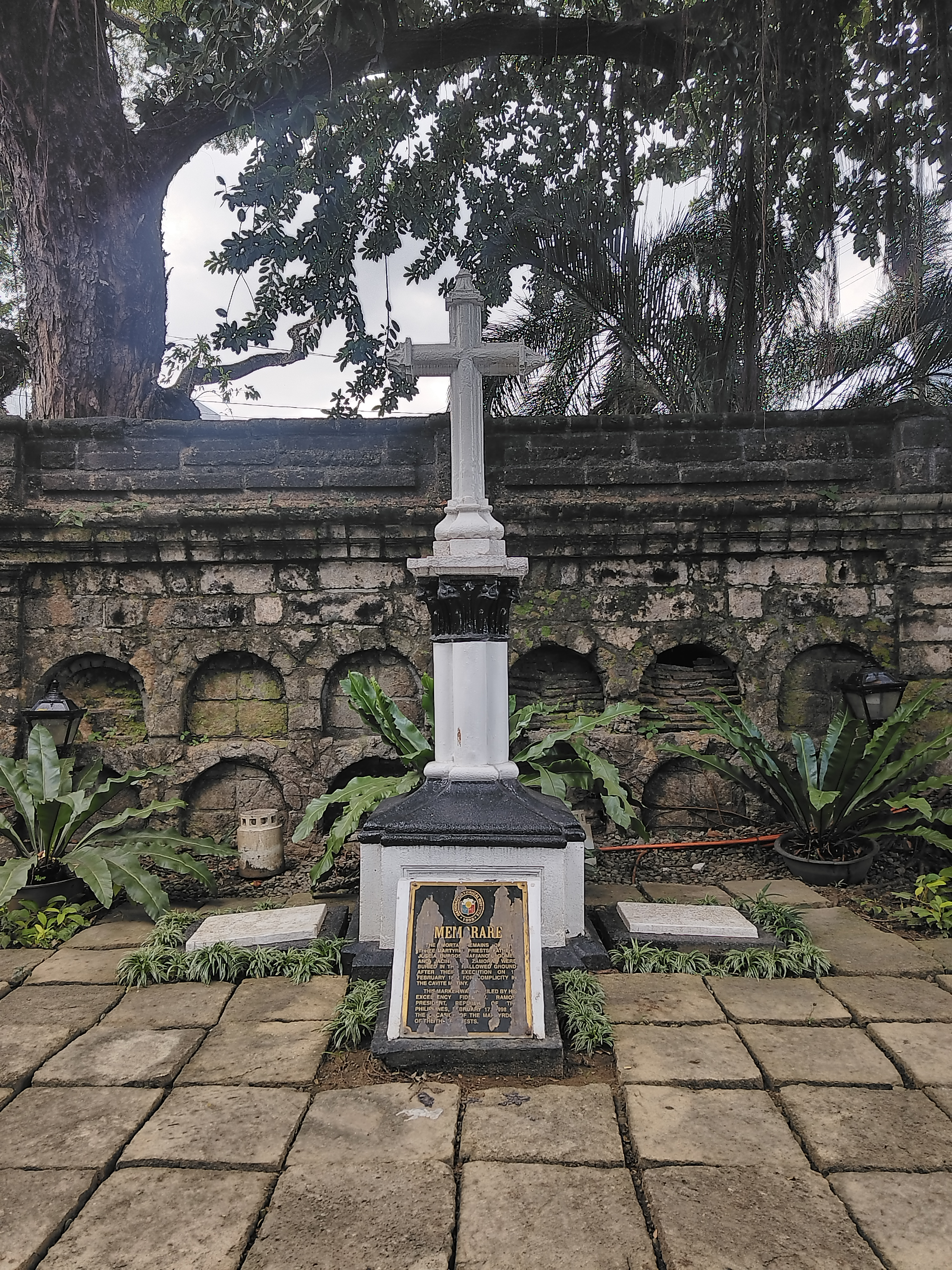
Gomburza's Grave at Paco Park

In 1978, remains believed to belong to the three priests were discovered at the Paco Park Cemetery by the Manila City Engineers Office. A gravesite commemorating the trio was then erected at the site.

== In popular culture ==
The following films are about the trio, or at least one of them:

- Padre Burgos (1949)
- Gomburza (1977)
- GomBurZa (2023) — Dante Rivero as Gomez, Cedrick Juan as Burgos, Enchong Dee as Zamora
- Isang komedya sa langit (2025)

In a segment of a 2022 episode of Pinoy Big Brother: Kumunity Season 10 where Robi Domingo was conducting a history quiz bee, contestants Kai Espenido and Gabb Skribikin, mistakenly referred to the trio as "MaJoHa", combining their first, instead of their last, names. The incident went viral and the public condemned the state of history education in the Philippines because of it. In 2024, President Bongbong Marcos lamented the youth's lack of knowledge on the trio.

The Filipino novel Revolution: 80 Days (2022) featured the Gomburza as key figures in the life of its protagonist Juan Ruiz, a former soldier turned migrant worker.
