= 1872 Cavite mutiny =

Filipino uprising against Spanish rule

Cavite mutiny
- Part of the Philippine revolts against Spain
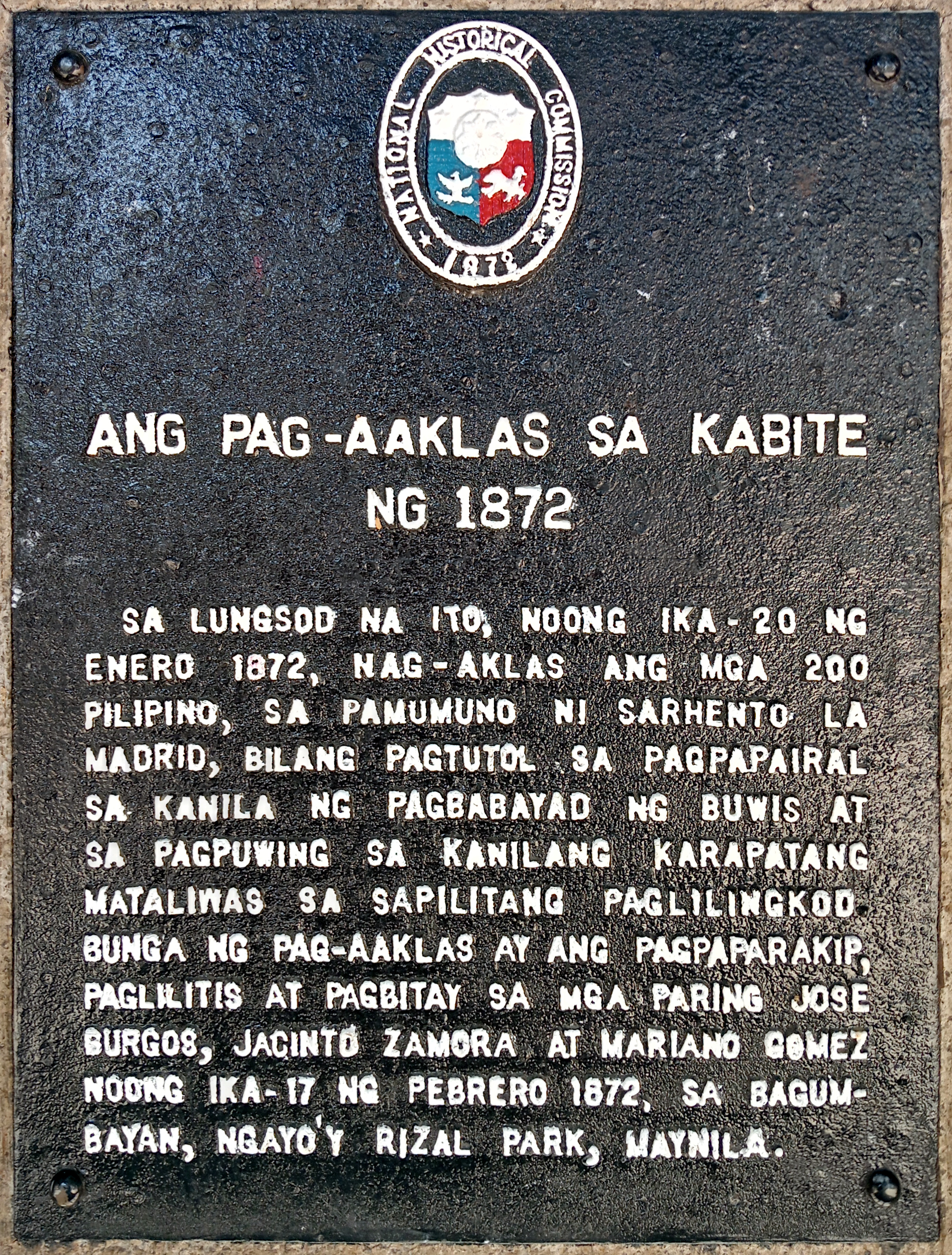
- A historical marker installed in 1972 by the National Historical Commission at Samonte Park to commemorate the mutiny
Date	January 20, 1872
Location	Fort San Felipe, Cavite, Spanish East Indies (Philippine Islands)
Result	Spanish victory: Execution of Gomburza; Forced exile of many Philippine liberals to Hong Kong, Japan, the Marianas and other places; Beginning of Filipino nationalism leading to the Philippine Revolution (1896–1898) and later the Philippine–American War (1899–1902)

Belligerents
(Spain) Spanish Empire: Captaincy General of the Philippines	Filipino mutineers

Commanders and leaders
(Spain) Felipe Ginovés	Fernando La Madrid

Strength
One regiment, four cannons	Around 200 soldiers and laborers

The Cavite mutiny (Spanish: Motín de Cavite; Filipino: Pag-aaklas sa Kabite) was an uprising of Filipino military personnel of Fort San Felipe, the Spanish arsenal in Cavite, Philippine Islands (then also known as part of the Spanish East Indies) on January 20, 1872. Around 200 locally recruited colonial troops and laborers rose up in the belief that it would elevate to a national uprising. The mutiny was unsuccessful, and government soldiers executed many of the participants and began to crack down on a burgeoning Philippines nationalist movement. Many scholars believed that the Cavite mutiny was the beginning of Filipino nationalism that would eventually lead to the Philippine Revolution.

== Causes of the Cavite mutiny ==
The causes of the Cavite Mutiny can be identified through examining the different accounts in this historic event.

=== Filipino accounts of the mutiny ===
==== Account of Trinidad Pardo de Tavera ====
The event was just a simple mutiny since up to that time the Filipinos have no intention of separation from Spain but only secure materials and education advancements in the country. However, the mutiny was used at a powerful level. Also, in this time, the central government deprived friars of the powers of involvement in civil government and in governing and handling universities. This resulted in the friars' fear that their leverage in the Philippines would be a thing in the past, lazebo took advantage of the mutiny and reported it to the Spanish government as a broad conspiracy organized throughout the archipelago with the object of abolishing Spanish sovereignty. The Madrid government without any attempt to investigate the real facts or extent of the alleged revolution reported by Izquierdo and the friars believed the scheme was true.

=== Spanish accounts of the mutiny ===
José Montero y Vidal was a Spanish historian who interpreted that the mutiny was an attempt to remove and overthrow the Spanish colonizers in the Philippines. His account, corroborated with the account of Governor-General Rafael Izquierdo, the governor-general of the Philippines at the time of the mutiny. Both mentioned that the mutiny was powered by a group of native clergy.

==== Account of Jose Montero y Vidal ====
The Cavite Mutiny was a plot by the natives to remove the Spanish government from the Philippines, due to the removal of privileges enjoyed by the laborers of the Cavite arsenal at Fort San Felipe, such as exemption from the tribute and forced labor (polo y servicio). The democratic and republican books and pamphlets, the speeches and preaching of the apostles of these new ideas in Spain and the outburst of the American publicists and the cruel policies of the insensitive governor whom the reigning government sent to govern the country. Native Filipinos put into action these ideas where the occurring conditions which gave rise to the idea of achieving their independence.

==== Account of Governor-General Izquierdo ====
Governor-General Izquierdo insisted that the mutiny was stimulated and prepared by the native clergy, mestizos and lawyers as a signal of objection against the injustices of the government such as not paying provinces for tobacco crops, pay tribute and rendering of forced labor. It is not clearly identified if the natives planned to inaugurate a monarchy or a republic because according to Izquierdo they do not have a word in their own language to describe this different form of government, whose leader in Filipino would be called "pinuno". However, it turned out that they would set at the supreme of the government a priest and that the leader selected would be José Burgos or Jacinto Zamora, which was the plan of the rebels who guided them; and the means they counted upon its realization.

=== Other foreign accounts of the mutiny ===
==== Account of Edmund Plauchut ====
Plauchut traced the immediate cause to a peremptory order from the Governor-General Izquierdo, exacting personal taxes from the Filipino laborers in the engineering and artillery corps in the Cavite arsenal, and requiring them to perform forced labor like ordinary subjects. Until then, these workers in the arsenal had been enjoying exemptions from both taxes and forced labor. January 20, the day of the revolt, was payday and the laborers found the amount of taxes as well as the corresponding fee in lieu of the forced labor deducted from their pay envelopes. It was the last straw. That night they mutinied. Forty infantry soldiers and twenty men from the artillery took over command of Fort of San Felipe and fired carronades to announce their moment of triumph. It was a short-lived victory. Apparently, the mutineers had expected to be joined by their comrades in the 7th infantry company assigned to patrol the Cavite plaza. They became terror-stricken, however, when they beckoned to the 7th infantry men from the ramparts of the fort and their comrades did not make any move to join them. Instead, the company started attacking them. The rebels decided to bolt the gates and wait for morning when support from Manila was expected to come. He gave a dispassionate account of it and its causes in an article published in the Revue des Deux Mondes in 1877. He traced that the primary cause of the mutiny is believed to "be an order from Governor-General Carlos de la Torre (Izquierdo's predecessor) to subject the soldiers of the Engineering and Artillery Corps to personal taxes, from which they were previously exempt. The taxes required them to pay a monetary sum as well as to perform forced labor called, polo y servicio. The mutiny was sparked on January 20, 1872, when the laborers received their pay and realized the taxes as well as the falla, the fine one paid to be exempt from forced labor, had been deducted from their salaries.

Different accounts in the Cavite mutiny also highlighted other probable causes of the "revolution" which included a Spanish revolution which overthrew the secular throne, dirty propagandas proliferated by unrestrained press, democratic, liberal and republican books and pamphlets reaching the Philippines, and most importantly, the presence of the native clergy who out of animosity against the Spanish friars, "conspired and supported" the rebels and enemies of Spain.

In addition, accounts of the mutiny suggest that the Glorious Revolution in Spain during that time added more determination to the natives to overthrow the current colonial Spanish government.

== Battle ==
Their leader was Fernando La Madrid, a mestizo sergeant. They seized Fort San Felipe and killed eleven Spanish officers. The mutineers thought that Filipino native soldiers in Manila would join them in a concerted uprising, the signal being the firing of rockets from the city walls on that night. Unfortunately, what they thought to be the signal was actually a burst of fireworks in celebration of the feast of Our Lady of Loreto, the patron of Sampaloc. The plan was to set fires in Tondo in order to distract the authorities while the artillery regiment and infantry in Manila could take control of Fort Santiago and use cannon shots as signals to Cavite. All Spaniards were to be killed, except for the women. News of the mutiny reached Manila, supposedly through the lover of a Spanish sergeant, who then informed his superiors, and the Spanish authorities feared for a massive Filipino uprising. The next day, a regiment led by General Felipe Ginovés besieged the fort until the mutineers surrendered. Ginovés then ordered his troops to fire at those who surrendered, including La Madrid. The rebels were formed in a line, when Colonel Sabas asked who would not cry out, "Viva España", and shot the one man who stepped forward. The rest were imprisoned.

== Aftermath ==
In the immediate aftermath, some Filipino soldiers were disarmed and later sent into exile on the southern island of Mindanao. Those suspected of directly supporting the mutineers were arrested and executed. The mutiny was used by the colonial government and Spanish friars to implicate three secular priests, Mariano Gomez, José Burgos, and Jacinto Zamora, collectively known as Gomburza. They were executed by garrote in Luneta, also known in Tagalog as Bagumbayan, on February 17, 1872. These executions, particularly those of the Gomburza, were to have a significant effect on people because of the shadowy nature of the trials. José Rizal, whose brother Paciano was a close friend of Burgos, dedicated his work, El filibusterismo, to these three priests.

On January 27, 1872, Governor-General Izquierdo approved the death sentences on 41 of the mutineers. On February 6, eleven more were sentenced to death, but these were later commuted to life imprisonment. Others were exiled to other islands of the colonial Spanish East Indies such as Guam, Mariana Islands, including Joaquin Pardo de Tavera, Antonio M. Regidor y Jurado, Pio Basa, and José María Basa. The most important group created a colony of Filipino expatriates in Europe, particularly in the Spanish capital of Madrid and Barcelona, where they were able to create small insurgent associations and print publications that were to advance the claims of the seeding Philippine Revolution.

Finally, a decree was made, stating there were to be no further ordinations/appointments of Filipinos as Catholic parish priests. In spite of the mutiny, the Spanish authorities continued to employ large numbers of native Filipino troops, carabineros and civil guards in their colonial forces through the 1870s–1890s until the Spanish–American War of 1898.

=== Behind the story of Cavite mutiny ===
During the short trial, the captured mutineers testified against Father Burgos. The state witness, Francisco Zaldua, declared that he had been told by one of the Basa brothers that the "government of Father Burgos" would bring a navy fleet of the United States to assist a revolution with which Ramón Maurente, the supposed field marshal, was financing with 50,000 pesos. The heads of the friar orders held a conference and decided to get rid of Burgos by implicating him to a plot. One Franciscan friar disguised as Burgos and suggested a mutiny to the mutineers. The senior friars used an una fuerte suma de dinero or a banquet to convince Governor-General Izquierdo that Burgos was the mastermind of the coup. Gómez and Zamora were close associates of Burgos, so they too were included in the allegations. Also, Zaldua had been the principal informer against the three priests. His statement had been the main basis for the convictions and he had been promised pardon in exchange for his testimony, however, he was condemned along with the three. He was the first to be executed among them on February 17, 1872.

The Central Government in Madrid proclaimed that they want to deprive the friars of all the power of intervention in matters of civil government and direction and management of educational institutions. The friars feared that their dominance in the country would become a thing of the past, and that they needed something to justify their perpetuation, with the mutiny providing such an opportunity. However, the Philippine Institute was introduced by the Spanish government as an educational decree fusing sectarian schools once ran by the friars. This decree aimed to improve the standard of education in the Philippines by requiring teaching positions in these schools to be filled by competitive examinations, an important step welcomed by most Filipinos.

== Execution of Gomburza ==
On February 15, 1872, the Spanish colonial authorities charged the Fathers Burgos, Gomez and Zamora with treason and sedition, and subversion; and were sentenced to death by garrote at Bagumbayan, Philippines. They were executed two days after their verdict. The charge against the three was their alleged complicity in the uprising of workers at the Cavite Naval Yard. It was believed by Governor-General Izquierdo that the Filipinos will create its own government and allegedly, the three priests were nominated as the leader of the planned government in order to break free of the Spanish government.

The death of Gomburza awakened strong spirits of anger and resentment among the Filipinos. They grilled Spanish authorities and demanded reforms due to the prejudicial governance of the authorities. The martyrdom of the three priests, ironically, assisted in the creation of the Propaganda Movement which aimed to seek reforms and inform the Spanish people on the abuses of its colonial authorities in the Philippine Islands.

Besides from Gomburza execution on January 28, 1872, the military court also sentenced 41 mutineers to death. However, the next day Izquierdo pardoned 28 mutineers and the rest were confirmed to sentence. On February 6, 1872, 11 mutineers were sentenced to death but Izquierdo commuted their death sentences to life imprisonment. Together with execution of the three martyrs, Enrique Paraiso, Maximo Innocencio and Crisanto de los Reyes were imposed ten years imprisonment.

Furthermore, there were people being sentenced by the military court of Spain to exile them to the Marianas (now Guam): Fr. Pedro Dandan, Fr. Mariano Sevilla, Toribio H. del Pilar (brother of Marcelo H. del Pilar), Agustin Mendoza, José Guevara, Miguel Lasa, Justo Guazon, Fr. Aniceto Desiderio, Fr. Vicente del Rosario, Joaquín Pardo de Tavera, Antonio Ma. Regidor, José Basa y Enriquez, Mauricio de Leon, Pedro Carillo, Gervasio Sanchez, José Ma. Basa, Pío Basa, Balvino Mauricio, Maximo Paterno (father of Pedro Paterno) and Valentín Tosca.

On the orders of Governor-General Izquierdo, a number of priests and laypeople were detained as a result of the uprising in Cavite. Among the priests detained in the days that followed were Fathers Jose Burgos, Jacinto Zamora, Mariano Gomez, and several Filipino lawyers and merchants. In Guam, further Filipinos were punished. The three priests, however, received a garrote death sentence.

The three priests were judged guilty of treason as the leaders of the mutiny by the Spanish court on the evening of February 15, 1872. Early the next morning, the verdict was announced at Fort Santiago.

An estimated 40,000 Filipinos gathered around the execution platforms on February 17, 1872. Father Burgos accepted his fate, Father Zamora had vacant eyes, and Father Gomez was holding his head high during the execution. Along with them, Saldua, an artilleryman, was put to death.

Public outrage over their executions eventually gave rise to the Propaganda Movement, a late 19th-century political reform movement in the Philippines that aimed to address issues including representation in the Spanish Cortes and the secularization of the clergy. In the Spanish colonial government, the movement aimed to promote more autonomy and representation for Filipinos.

== Cultural references ==
- The Filipino novel Revolution: 80 Days (2022) featured the 1872 Cavite Mutiny as a pivotal event in the life of its protagonist Juan Ruiz, a former soldier turned migrant worker.
