= José Burgos =

Filipino Catholic priest (1837 to 1872)

The Reverend Father José Apolonio Burgos
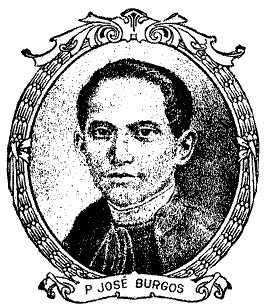
- José Apolonio Burgos
- Church: Catholic Church

Personal details
- Born: José Apolonio Burgos y García; February 9, 1837 Vigan, Ilocos Sur, Captaincy General of the Philippines, Spanish Empire
- Died: February 17, 1872 (aged 35) Bagumbayan, Manila, Captaincy General of the Philippines, Spanish Empire
- Denomination: Roman Catholic
- Parents: José Tiburcio Burgos; Florencia Burgos (née García)

José Apolonio Burgos y García (February 9, 1837 – February 17, 1872) was a Filipino Catholic priest, accused of mutiny by the Spanish colonial authorities in the Philippines in the 19th century. He was tried and executed in Manila along with two other clergymen, Mariano Gomez and Jacinto Zamora, who are collectively known as the Gomburza.

== Early life ==
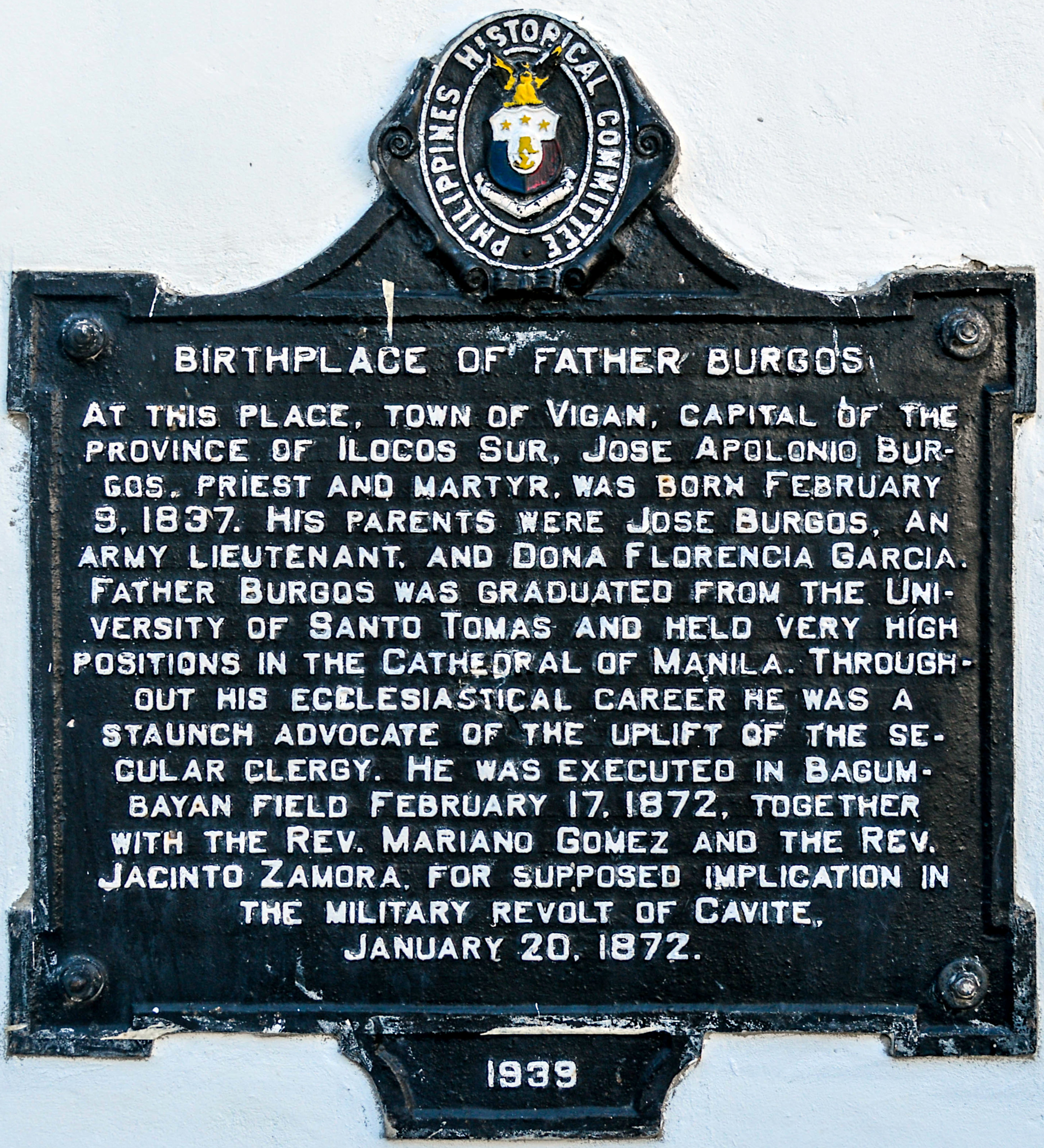
Historical marker installed in 1939 in Vigan

José Burgos, baptized José Apolonio Burgos y García, was born in Vigan, Ilocos Sur on February 9, 1837, to a Spanish officer, Don José Tiburcio Burgos y Calderón, and a Filipino mestiza mother named Florencia García. He obtained three undergraduate degrees with honors, two master's degrees and two doctorate degrees from the Colegio de San Juan de Letran and from the University of Santo Tomas. He conducted his first mass in Intramuros.

== Contributions ==
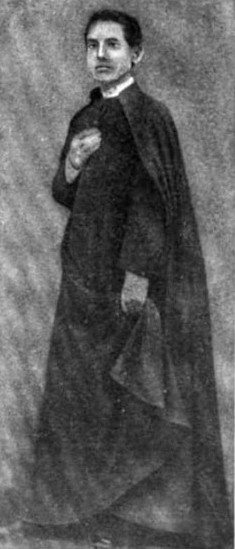
Portrait of Burgos from the Lineage, Life and Labors of José Rizal, Philippine Patriot by Austin Craig, published 1913

Burgos' nationalist views, codified in editorial essays, championing political and ecclesiastic reforms in favor of empowering more native clergymen, made him a target of opposition to civil authorities.

Occurred as a parish priest at the Manila Cathedral where he became a dean.

He received these degrees while acting as a curate of the Parish of St. Peter which comprised the Walled City. Having taken all these courses, he became a member of the examining board for priests.

His studies finished and having passed a competitive examination to secure an office in the Manila Cathedral, he was ordained second priest of the Cathedral, Fiscal of the Ecclesiastical Court, and Professor and Master of Ceremonies of the University of Santo Tomas.

Young Filipinos studied serving mustering ground for national unity in the schools in the city of Manila. They are the one who encouraged the spread of education which led to the formation of an intelligent middle class. Sooner, these Filipinos became the leaders of the movement for the reform and greater participation in the government. In that time there were two group of leaders: the laymen and the priests. The laymen were composed of businessmen, lawyers, physicians, and proprietors where in, they desired to end all legislation that discriminated the Filipinos. While the priests, they bonded together so as to achieve reforms.

The overall demand for reform at the time had its religious just as its political aspects, and under the initiative of Father Burgos, the local church started to demand their equitable rights and to demand that duly trained secular priests, the greater part of whom were locals and who were oppressed by the religious authorities, be again allowed to hold areas, a right they had once delighted in, yet which had been removed. Father Burgos thusly made ground-breaking adversaries among the friars.

Witnessing the treatment of his peers by the Spanish clerical authorities, Burgos became a prominent advocate for ecclesiastical and national reform. Despite holding several significant positions, he dedicated his efforts to securing rights and support for the secular clergy.

In 1864, an anonymous pamphlet was published in Manila, criticizing the prejudice in the Church, and providing rebuttals against several canards against the native clergy. Although the document was unsigned, historians believe the author to be Burgos, based on its style and content. Burgos also penned several signed articles later in his life, in response to a series of anonymous written attacks on the Filipino clergy. Though Burgos offered few new ideas, his name caught the attention of Spanish authorities, who would report that the native clergy was becoming separatist.

In 1869, Felipé Buencamino, a young student and an acquaintance of Burgos, was charged with spreading nationalist propaganda in the form of leaflets scattered throughout his school's campus, demanding academic freedom. This accusation was given credence by a protest he staged several months prior in opposition to being required to speak Latin in classes. Consequently, Buencamino and some of his associates were sent to jail. With the aid of Burgos, Buencamino was freed four months later, only to be told that having missed school for four months, he would have to find a tutor who would help him make up for the classes he missed. Buencamino chose Burgos.

By this time, Burgos had established a reputation as a defender of the native clergy. His debates over the rights of native priests had extended to include questions of race and nationalism. This reputation would eventually cause him to be implicated in a mutiny in Cavite.

== Secret Society of Reformers ==
José Burgos was a member of a confraternity, which met in the Santa Cruz home of Padre Mariano. It was presided over by José María Basa, and included Agustín Mendoza, Máximo Paterno, and Ambrosio Rianzares Bautista. The group's goal was to seek reforms, listed in Eco de Filipinas, which was published in Madrid. He founded the newspaper of La Nacion (The Spanish Nation), this is publication served when the voice of Filipino Propaganda where eager devoted high degree against the Spanish colonizers, however expose to abuse the Liberal Spanish government in Secularism of Insulares y Indios. On June 27, 1864, he written in this paper list of Manifesto, was published in Spain and written by an anonymous author called for clerical equity and denounced Spanish prejudices and discrimination towards the Filipinos.

== Death ==
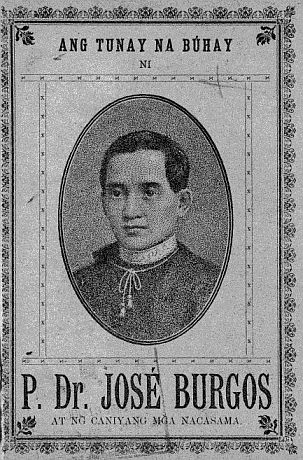
José Apolonio Burgos on the cover of the book Ang Tunay na Buhay ni P. Dr. Jose Burgos ("The True Life of P. Jose Burgos")

After the Cavite Mutiny on January 20, 1872, the trial of mutineer sergeant Bonifacio Octavo revealed that a man named Zaldua had been recruiting people for an uprising. Octavo testified that this man claimed to be under the orders of Burgos, but inconsistent details during Octavo's cross-examinations called into question the validity of his testimony. Nevertheless, governor-general Rafael Izquierdo reported to Madrid that the testimony had confirmed his suspicions, and pinned the blame on Burgos and two other priests, Jacinto Zamora and Mariano Gomez, for sedition.

On February 17, 1872, they were garroted in the middle of Bagumbayan field (now Luneta Park).

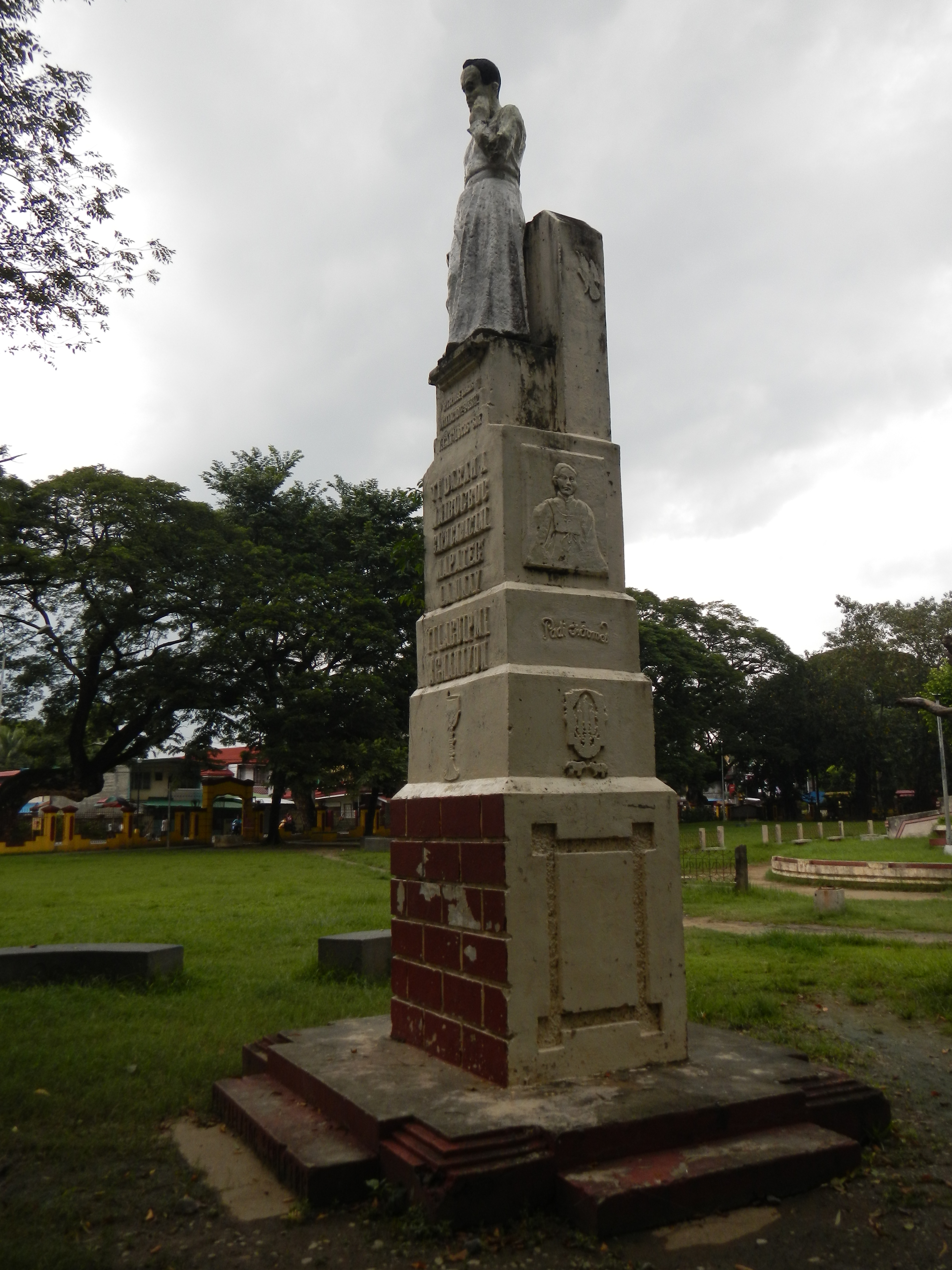
Monument at Asingan, Pangasinan

== Influence ==
Burgos was a close friend and associate of Paciano Rizal, José Rizal's older brother and mentor. Burgos's execution - along with Gómez's and Zamora's - deeply affected José, who was inspired to write his second novel, El Filibusterismo.

Several towns in the Philippines were named in his honor. These include:

- Burgos, Ilocos Norte
- Burgos, Ilocos Sur
- Burgos, Isabela
- Burgos, La Union
- Burgos, Pangasinan
- Padre Burgos, Quezon
- Padre Burgos, Southern Leyte
- Burgos, Surigao del Norte

== In popular culture ==
- Portrayed by Jaime de la Rosa in the 1949 film, Padre Burgos
- Portrayed by Toby Alejar in an episode of Bayani in 1996.
- Portrayed by Paolo Paraiso in the official music video of GMA Network's production of Lupang Hinirang in 2010.
- Portrayed by Isko Moreno in the 2014 film, Bonifacio: Ang Unang Pangulo.
- Portrayed by Cedrick Juan in the 2023 film, GomBurZa.
