= Capital punishment in the Philippines =

Capital punishment in the Philippines (Filipino: Parusang kamatayan sa Pilipinas) was abolished in 2006. The death penalty as a form of state-sponsored repression was introduced and widely practiced by the Spanish East Indies government in the Philippines. A substantial number of Filipino nationalist figures like Mariano Gómez, José Burgos, and Jacinto Zamora (collectively known as GomBurZa ), the Thirteen Martyrs of Cavite (Trece Mártires), the Thirteen Martyrs of Bagumbayan, the Fifteen Martyrs of Bicol (Quince Mártires de Bicolandia), the Nineteen Martyrs of Aklan, and José Rizal were among those executed by the Spanish colonial government.

Numerous Philippine parks, monuments, learning institutions, roads, and local government units are named after José Rizal and those executed by the Spanish as a reminder of colonial atrocities using the death penalty. After the 1946 execution of Imperial Japanese Army General Tomuyuki Yamashita in Los Baños after World War II and the formal establishment of the Third Republic, capital punishment was mainly a deterrent against widespread crime that dominated, until the imposition of Martial Law in 1972.

The Philippines and Cambodia are the only Association of South East Asian Nations (ASEAN) member states that have abolished the death penalty.

== Spanish and American colonial rule ==
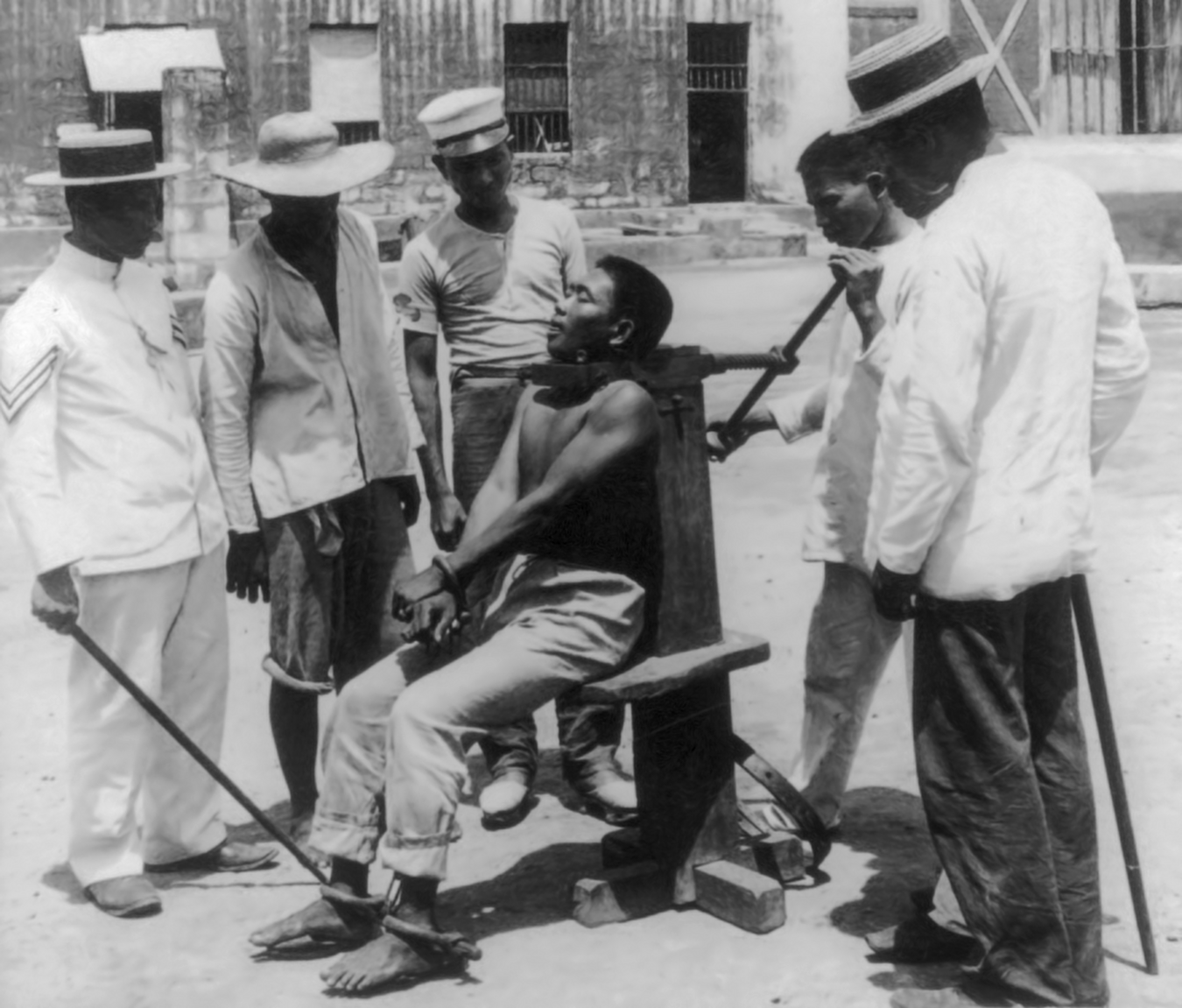
A 1901 execution at the Old Bilibid Prison, Manila, Philippines

During Spanish colonial rule, the most common methods of execution were death by firing squad (especially for treason/military crimes, usually reserved for independence fighters) and garrote.

A notable case of execution through garrote by the repressive Spanish government in the Philippines is the execution of three Filipino Catholic martyr priests, Mariano Gomez, José Burgos, and Jacinto Zamora, also known as Gomburza. The execution is often cited as an example of injustice during Spanish colonial rule and is considered a significant turning point in the Philippine struggle for independence.

Death by hanging was another popular method of execution.

Another prominent example is the execution of Philippine nationalist reformer José Rizal, who was executed by firing squad on the morning of December 30, 1896, in the park that now bears his name. The execution hastened the independence movement that led to the 1898 independence of the Philippines from Spanish colonial rule.

In 1902, the Philippine Commission abolished the use of garrote as a means of executing criminals and substituted in place thereof execution by hanging.

In 1926, the electric chair (Spanish: silla eléctrica; Filipino: silya eléktrika) was introduced by the United States' colonial Insular Government, making the Philippines the only other country to employ this method. The last colonial-era execution took place under Governor-General Theodore Roosevelt Jr. in February 1932. There were no executions under Manuel L. Quezon, the first President of the Commonwealth.

== Japanese occupation during WW2 ==
Despite the United States of America being a neutral country at the beginning of World War II, in early December 1941 the military of the Empire of Japan began the brutal Japanese occupation of the Philippines in which an estimated 1 million Philippine citizens died. Although there are few records of formal "capital punishment" sentences being handed down by Japanese military tribunals, extensive evidence exists of outright summary executions and massacres by both the Imperial Japanese Army and the Kempeitai, such as the Manila massacre and the Bataan Death March.

== Post WW2 era (1946 to 1986) ==
After the Philippines regained full sovereignty in July 1946 via the Treaty of Manila, capital crimes punishable by death were murder and treason. As a result of World War II Philippine war crimes trials, 17 Japanese war criminals were hanged between 1948 and 1950. However, no civilian executions took place until April 25, 1950, when Julio Gullien was executed for attempting to assassinate President Manuel Roxas. Rape would later be listed as a capital crime in 1960.

Former Governor of Negros Occidental, Rafael Lacson, with 22 of his allies, were sentenced to death in August 1954 for the murder of a political opponent. Ultimately, Lacson was never executed. Other notable cases include gang leader Marciál "Baby" Ama, electrocuted at the age of 16 on October 4, 1961, for murders committed while in prison for lesser charges. Ama notably became the subject of a 1976 film adaptation, Bitayin si... Baby Ama? (Execute... Baby Ama?).

Until 1961, a total of 51 people were electrocuted. Execution numbers climbed under President Ferdinand Marcos, who himself was sentenced to death in 1939 for the murder of his father Mariano's political rival Julio Nalundasan but was acquitted on appeal. A controversial triple execution took place on May 17, 1972, when Jaime José, Basílio Pineda, and Edgardo Aquino were electrocuted for the 1967 abduction and gang rape of young actress Maggie de la Riva. The state ordered the executions be broadcast on nationwide radio.

Under the Marcos dictatorship, drug trafficking also became punishable by death by firing squad, as was the case with Lim Seng. His execution on January 15, 1973, was ordered broadcast on national television; present was then-Chief of the Philippine Constabulary General Fidel V. Ramos (later himself a President).

The electric chair was used until 1976, when it was replaced by the firing squad as the sole execution method. Under Marcos’ 20-year authoritarian rule, however, many people were summarily executed, tortured, or disappeared for opposing his regime.

=== 1987 Constitution abolishment ===
After Marcos was deposed in February 1986, the newly drafted 1987 Constitution prohibited the death penalty but allowed Congress to reinstate it “hereafter” for “heinous crimes”. This made the Philippines the first Asian country to abolish capital punishment, replacing it with reclusión perpetua.

When the death penalty was still enforced, male death row inmates were held at New Bilibid Prison in Muntinlupa, while female death row inmates were held at Correctional Institution for Women (Mandaluyong). The death chamber for electrocutions was in Building 14, within the Maximum Security Compound of New Bilibid. The present Bureau of Corrections (BuCor) Museum previously served as the lethal injection chamber.

=== Post-independence executions by President ===
- Elpidio Quirino (1948–1953): 13
- Ramon Magsaysay (1953–1957): 6
- Carlos P. Garcia (1957–1961): 14
- Diosdado Macapagal (1961–1965): 2
- Ferdinand Marcos, Sr (1965–1986): 32
- Joseph Estrada (1998–2001): 7

== 1993 re-introduction of the death penalty ==
=== Republic Act 7659 ===
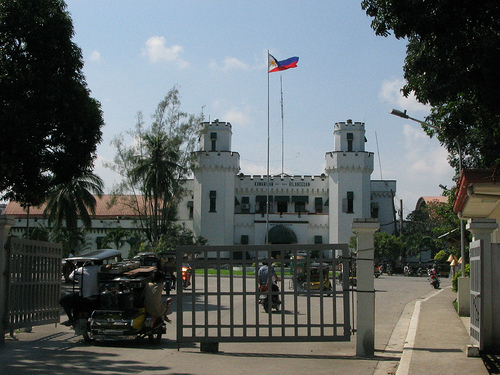
New Bilibid Prison once held male death row inmates

President Fidel V. Ramos promised in his campaign during the 1992 elections that he would support re-introducing of the death penalty, in response to high crime rates and increasing levels of drug addiction. Republic Act 7659, drafted by Ramos himself, was passed in 1993 and capital punishment was restored on December 31, 1993. The law provided for use of the electric chair until the gas chamber (chosen by the government to replace electrocution) could be used. In 1996, Republic Act 8177 was passed, prescribing the use of lethal injection as an execution method.

Under Republic Act 7659, the commission of the following offences may have resulted in the death penalty:

- Kidnapping - mandatory if committed for ransom, or the victim is killed, or the victim is tortured
- Rape - mandatory if the victim is below 7 years old or the offender is a law enforcement officer
- Qualified Bribery - mandatory if a public official demands financial rewards
- Piracy - that endangers life or results in death
- Treason
- Murder
- Drug Trafficking

Regarding drug offences, a person caught in possession of the following quantities of narcotics was deemed to be trafficking a capital amount:

- 40 grams or more of cocaine
- 40 grams or more of opium
- 40 grams or more of morphine
- 40 grams or more of heroin
- 50 grams or more of cannabis resin
- 200 grams or more of methamphetamine
- 750 grams or more of marijuana

=== Reinstatement and moratorium ===
Executions resumed in 1999 under President Joseph Estrada when Leo Echegaray was put to death by lethal injection, marking the first execution after the reinstatement of the death penalty. The next execution, that of convicted child rapist Eduardo Agbayani, saw an embarrassing mishap when President Estrada decided to grant a last-minute commutation but failed to reach prison authorities in time to stop the execution. Following a personal appeal by his spiritual advisor, Teodoro Bacani, now Bishop Emeritus of Novaliches, President Estrada called for a moratorium in 2000 to honor the bimillennial anniversary of Christ's birth. The last execution in the Philippines prior to the enactment of Republic Act 9346 took place on January 4, 2000, with the execution of rapist Alex Bartolome.

== 2006 Abolishment ==
=== Republic Act 9346 ===
President Gloria Macapagal Arroyo was a vocal opponent of the death penalty, approving a moratorium on capital punishment. On June 7, 2006, Congress overwhelmingly voted to abolish the death penalty, with President Arroyo signing Republic Act 9346 on June 24. The penalties of life imprisonment and reclusión perpetua (detention of indefinite length, often a minimum of 30 years), replaced the death penalty. Critics of President Arroyo’s initiative called it a political move meant to placate the Catholic Church, which had sectors increasingly vocal in their opposition to her rule.

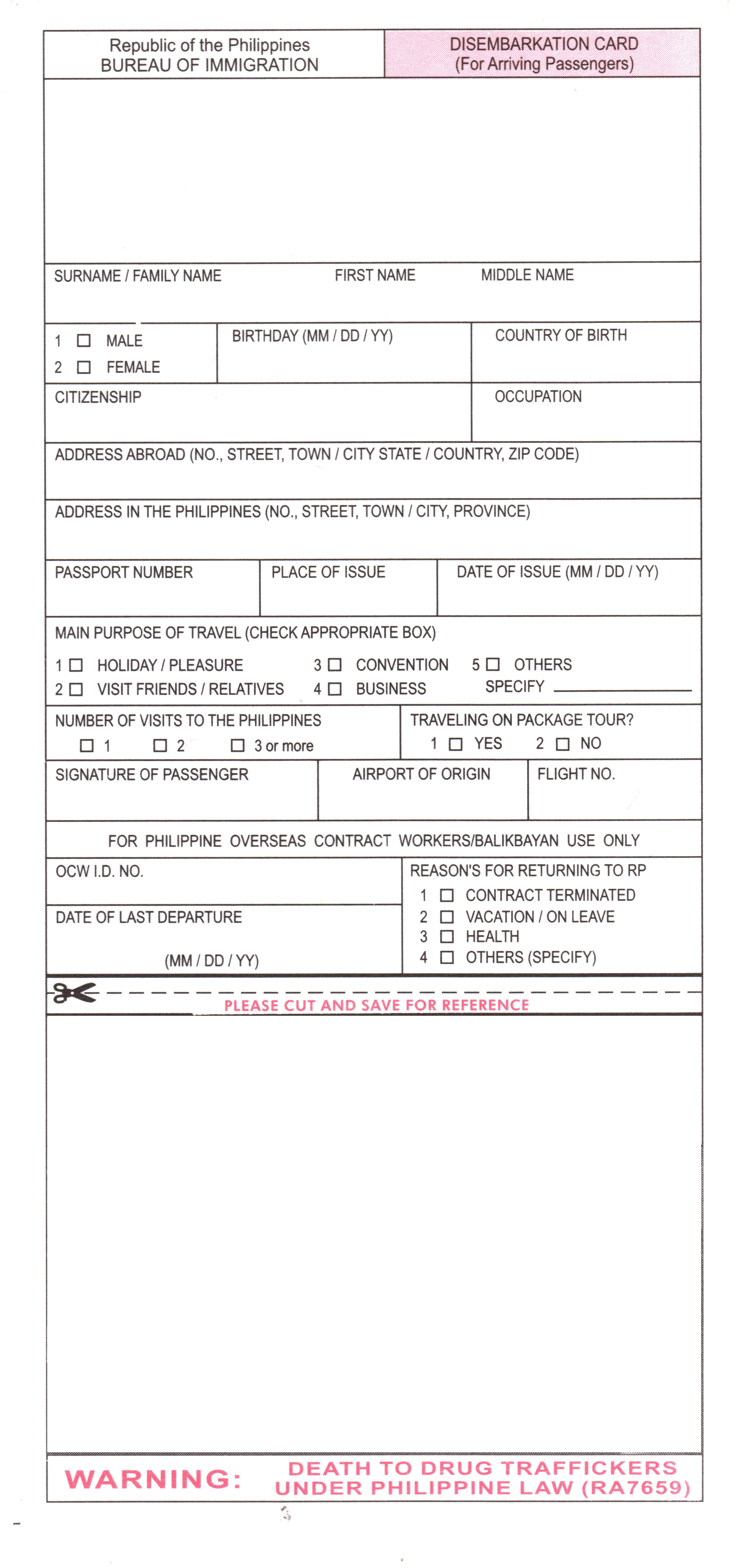
An old Philippine embarkation card (erroneously) warning visitors of the death penalty for drug trafficking after the abolition. The caveat has since been deleted in subsequent versions.

On April 15, 2006, the sentences of 1,230 death row inmates were simultaneously commuted to life imprisonment, which Amnesty International believes to be the "largest ever commutation of death sentences".

=== Protocol to the International Covenant on Civil and Political Rights ===
In 2007, the Philippines became a party to the Second Optional Protocol to the International Covenant on Civil and Political Rights concerning the abolition of the death penalty. The Optional Protocol commits its members to the abolition of the death penalty within their borders.

The Philippines signed the Second Optional Protocol to the International Covenant on Civil and Political Rights on September 20, 2006, and ratified it on November 20, 2007.

President Arroyo granted many pardons during her rule, including a 2009 blanket pardon for all living convicts involved in the 1983 assassination of former Senator and opposition leader Ninoy Aquino

== Proposed reintroduction ==
After Australian child rapist Peter Scully was arrested in February 2015, several Filipino prosecutors called for the death penalty to be reintroduced for violent sexual crimes. During the 2016 election campaign, presidential candidate and frontrunner Davao City Mayor Rodrigo Duterte promised to restore the death penalty in the Philippines. Duterte theatrically vowed "to litter Manila Bay with the bodies of criminals."

During the second presidential debate in March 2016, Duterte and Senator Grace Poe were the only candidates who favored partial restoration of the death penalty. Duterte supported the restoration of the death penalty by hanging for criminals involved in illegal drugs, gun-for-hire syndicates, and those who commit "heinous crimes" such as rape, robbery or car theft where the victim is murdered. Poe stated that capital punishment should be applied to criminals convicted of "drugs and multiple crimes where involved people can no longer be rehabilitated."

In December 2016, the bill to restore capital punishment for certain "heinous offenses" passed at the justice committee level of the House of Representatives.

Zeid Ra'ad Al Hussein, the UN Commissioner for Human Rights, responded with an open letter addressed to the Speaker of the House and the President of the Senate saying, "International law does not permit a State that has ratified or acceded to the Second Optional Protocol to denounce it or withdraw from it." Zaid asserted that there is no "denunciation clause" in the protocol, "thereby guaranteeing the permanent non-reintroduction of the death penalty by States that ratified the Protocol."

The bill passed the full House of Representatives in February 2017. That year, a Pulse Asia survey showed 67% of 1,200 Filipino respondents supported the death penalty. Actress and rape victim Maggie de la Riva expressed dismay in a 2017 interview that only drug-related crimes were included in crimes subject to the death penalty, and that heinous crimes such as rape were not included in the proposed bill.

The bill reinstating the death penalty stalled in Senate in April 2017, where it did not appear to have enough votes to pass.

In July 2019, bills seeking to reinstate capital punishment in the Philippines were revived in the Senate ahead of the opening of the 18th Congress.

After the 2020 Tarlac shooting, Senators Ronald dela Rosa and Manny Pacquiao urged considering the revival of the death penalty.

In 2025, Zamboanga City 1st District representative Khymer Adan Olaso filed House Bill 11211, proposing that all public officials convicted by the Sandiganbayan of graft and corruption, malversation of public funds, and plunder should be executed by firing squad. The proposed bill was criticized by La Union 1st District representative Francisco Paolo Ortega V as "medieval".

== Methods ==
The Philippines was the only country aside from the United States that used the electric chair, which had been introduced during the American colonial period. Until its first abolition in 1987, the country had reverted to using death by firing squad.

After the re-introduction of the death penalty in 1993, the country switched to lethal injection as its sole method of execution.

== See also ==
- Extrajudicial killings and forced disappearances in the Philippines
