= Trece Mártires (disambiguation) =

Trece Mártires (Spanish for Thirteen Martyrs) may refer to:

- Thirteen Martyrs of Cavite, Philippine nationalists executed by the Spanish in 1896
  - Trece Martires City, Cavite, Philippines, named after them.
- Thirteen Martyrs of Bagumbayan, executed in 1897
