= Máximo Inocencio =

Filipino architect and businessman

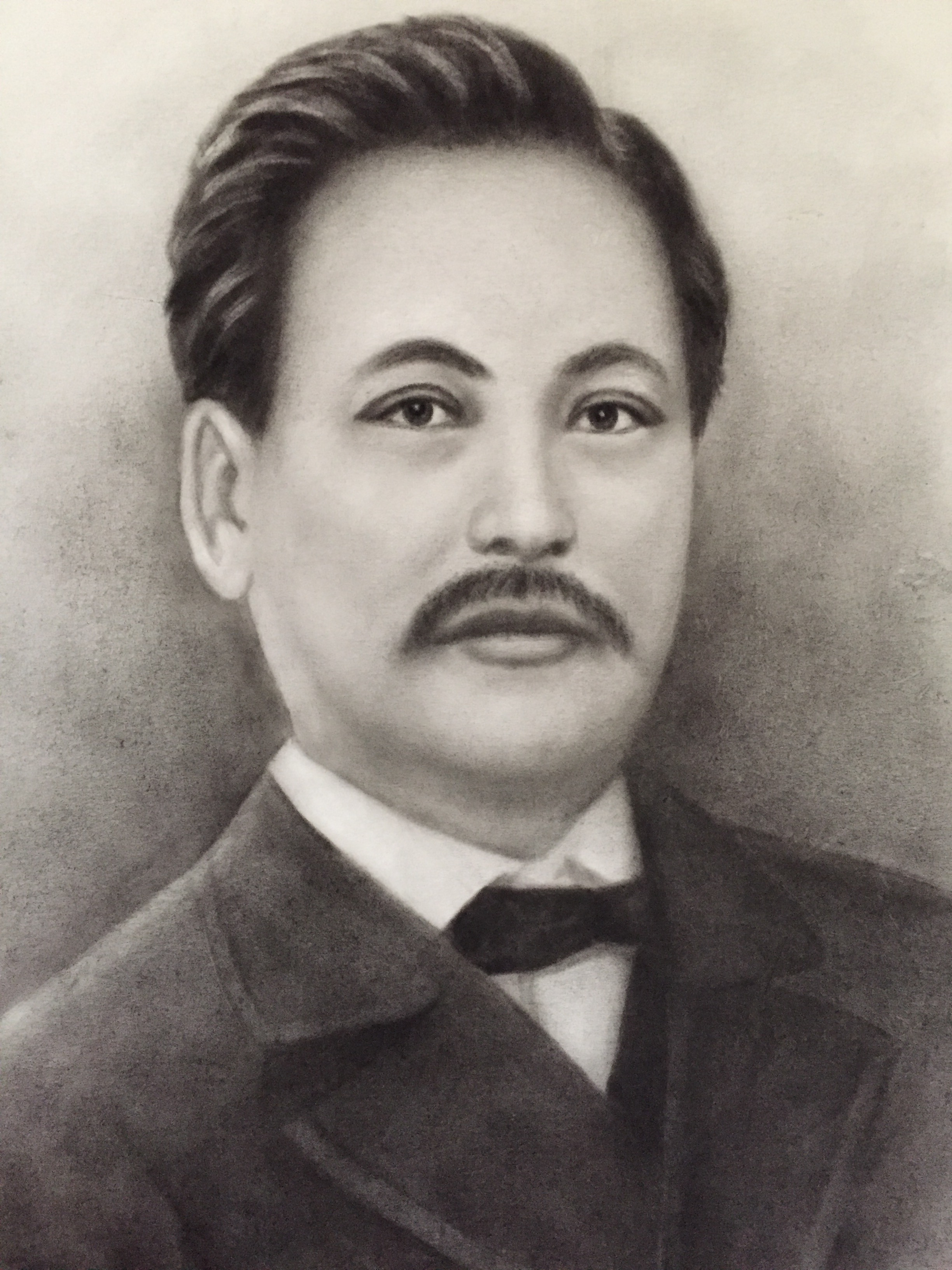
- Born: November 18, 1833; San Roque de Cavite, Captaincy General of the Philippines
- Died: September 12, 1896 (aged 62); Cavite, Captaincy General of the Philippines
- Burial place: San Agustin Church in Intramuros
- Spouse: Doña Narcisa Francisco

Máximo F. Inocencio (18 November 1833 – 12 September 1896) was a Filipino architect and businessman involved in construction, shipping, trade and lumber. He figured in the 1872 Cavite mutiny and was a financial supporter of the Philippine Revolution, leading to his execution by the Spaniards in 1896. Consequently, he and the other Filipinos executed came to be known as the Thirteen Martyrs of Cavite.

== Early life ==
Máximo Inocencio was born in San Roque de Cavite (now Cavite City). His parents were Ana Marie and Tranquilino Inocencio. His mother was a direct descendant of the Spanish family Franco. His father was a seaman who made voyages to and from Mexico. He was still a young boy when his father died.

Although one source identifies Inocencio as an architect and a carpenter by profession, little is known about his schooling. He pursued an independent occupation as an apprentice in a carpentry shop of the Cavite Arsenal. He later became a contractor and erected churches, bridges, buildings, and other public works in Cavite. His shop was located at San Roque, employing about 25 men.

== Cavite Mutiny ==
Máximo Inocencio had an established business and was a well-known citizen of means when the Cavite Mutiny of 1872 took place. Three priests – Mariano Gomez, Jose Burgos, and Jacinto Zamora – were executed on suspicion that they had plotted the mutiny. A historian states that Inocencio had nothing to do with this uprising, but because he was a Freemason, he was implicated in it. He was sentenced to 10 years imprisonment and deported to Ceuta, a penal colony of Spanish Morocco.

Inocencio was deported together with Pedro Paraiso and Crisanto de los Reyes. Later on, under Paraiso's leadership of, Inocencio crossed the border to France. From Marseille, he obtained his pardon and freedom after 10 years in exile.

== Business career ==
Back in the Philippines, Inocencio resumed his business activities such as a building and bridge contractor, shipbuilder, sawmill operator, and wood deliverer. His construction company built the Tejeros Bridge, the provincial capitol, the Cavite elementary and high schools, the cathedral and parochial house of San Pedro and the Inocencio mansion La Casa Grande. The company also repaired the church in Naic and the Dominican church in Cavite. He also constructed bancas, cascos and sailboats. He did business with the Spanish Navy and maintained a yard where repairs on small boats were done. Later, he established a sawmill and lumberyard.

He had three sailboats, Dos Hermanos La Luz, Amparo, and Aurea, which he used for hauling logs and transporting firewood from Mindoro, Mariveles, and from as far as Lagingmanok (renamed Padre Burgos), in Tayabas (now Quezon province) and also imported goods from China and Vietnam. He also regained his social prestige. In 1895, he was one of the members of the junta inspectora of the Hospicio de San Jose in Cavite, an honorary office headed by the parish priest. He was also a proprietor of a large store and was a contractor of the arsenal.

== Philippine Revolution ==
Inocencio joined the Katipunan and continued to support political causes including the Propaganda Movement abroad. In the Philippine Revolution of 1896, he offered his house as a hiding place for General Emilio Aguinaldo. Following Inocencio's death, the latter used Inocencio's mansion as his residence and headquarters before transferring to Bacoor on July 4, 1898. It was here that Aguinaldo established the Dictatorial Government on May 24, 1898. It was also here that Julián Felipe was asked by Aguinaldo to compose, and later play, a march that would become the Philippine national anthem. Bearing the Hong Kong-made first Filipino flag, Aguinaldo left La Casa Grande shortly after lunch on June 12, 1898, and headed to Kawit to proclaim Philippine Independence from the central window of his ancestral home.

The Spanish government began its crackdown on suspected revolutionaries when a seamstress told the governor's wife of her suspicion that Severino Lapidario, Alfonso de Ocampo and Luis Aguado were hatching a plot to overthrow the Spanish government. These three men were arrested, tortured and their statements were the basis of the arrests in the next few days.

Inocencio was implicated together with other prominent citizens of Cavite. He was the leader and financial supporter of the Katipunan revolt. In his declaration, Alfonso de Ocampo revealed that Inocencio, Francisco Osorio, Aguado and Lapidario were the leaders of the planned uprising in Cavite. The signal was to come from fireworks to be shot from Inocencio's camarin or warehouse. This testimony led to Inocencio's arrest on September 4, 1896.

The Spaniards confiscated all of his wealth and expelled his family from their home because he was accused and found guilty of funding the revolution.

== Thirteen Martyrs of Cavite ==
He was among 13 Caviteños who were found guilty of rebellion on September 11, 1896, after a hasty trial by a Spanish military court lasting only four hours. Their defense counsels were officers of the Spanish Army who immediately admitted their guilt instead of proving the insufficiency of evidence to convict them. The families of the 13 defendants were not informed of the verdict. They were not given the chance to say goodbye to their families. Their trial was kept a secret.

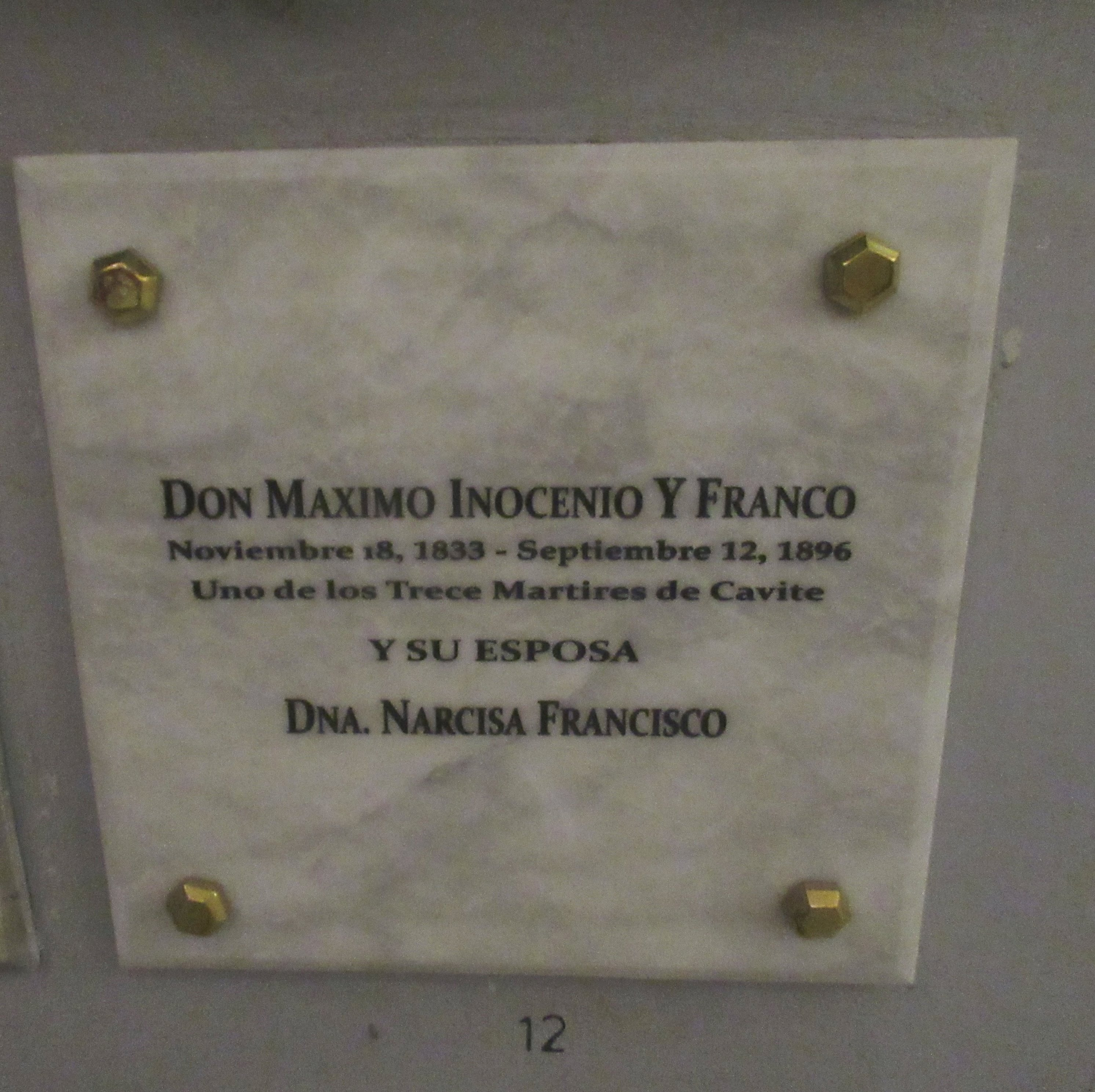
Narcisa Francisco & Inocencio's grave at San Agustin Church (Manila).

At 12:45 p.m. the following day, the 13 convicts were brought out of their cells and taken to the Plaza de Armas outside Fort San Felipe, made to line up, kneel facing the wall, their hands tied at their back and executed by firing squad. At age 63, Maximo was the oldest of the 13.

After the execution, bullet-ridden bodies were loaded into carabao-drawn carts and dumped in a common grave at the Catholic cemetery at the village of Caridad. Later, the bodies of seven of the victims, including Inocencio, were exhumed and interred in separate niches by Fr. Celedonio Mateo, a friendly Recollect friar as requested by their families. The rest remained unclaimed in the common grave. Inocencio's remains were placed in a niche at the Porta Vaga Church then later transferred to the San Agustin Church in Intramuros.

The execution was a warning to discourage the spread of the uprising. Within a week after their deaths however, all the towns of Cavite rose up in arms.

== Legacy ==
It is said of Inocencio that “with chisel and hammer he worked his way to wealth amassing one of the largest fortunes in the province.” He had been variously described as a diligent and hard worker, and a charitable citizen who did not fail to lend a helping hand to the needy.

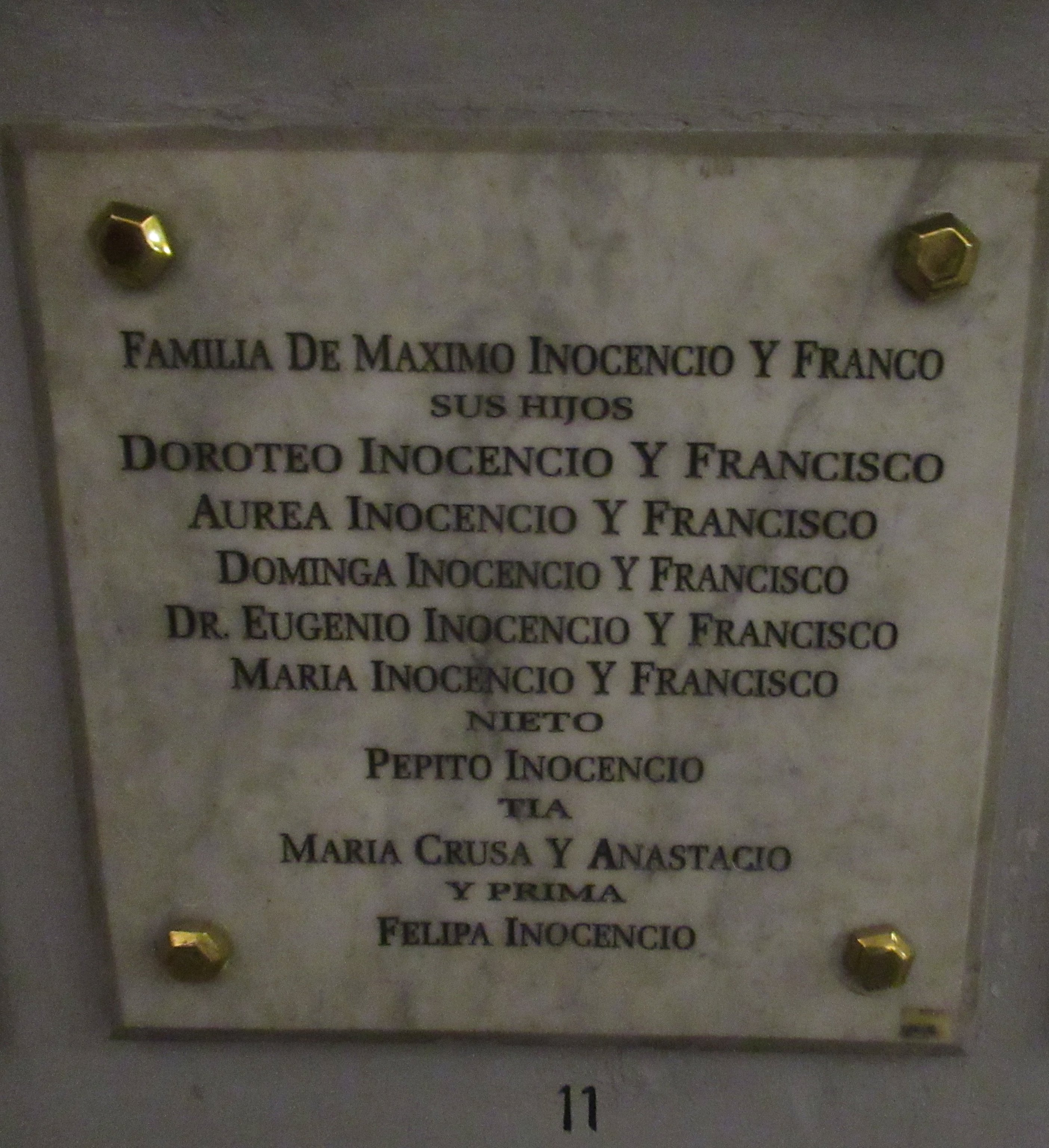
Inocencio's family niche at the Crypt of San Agustin Church (Manila).

He had nine children by his wife, Doña Narcisa Francisco, four of whom reached maturity. One of his granddaughters, Amalia Inocencio Jaime, married the war hero Gen. Benito Alejandrino Natividad.

Unfortunately, many of his projects were destroyed by aerial bombing during World War II, among them the Cavite provincial government building, the former provincial high school, the cathedral and parochial house of San Pedro and his residence, La Casa Grande on Calle Arsenal (now P. Gomez Street).

The city of Trece Martires, Cavite is named after the thirteen martyrs. There are life size statues of Inocencio and the other martyrs in a memorial erected in their honour.

Barangay Inocencio in Trece Martires is named in his honour.

== In popular culture ==
- Portrayed by Soliman Cruz in the 2012 film El Presidente.
- Portrayed by Neil Ryan Sese in the 2023 film GomBurZa.
