= Crispulo Zamora =

Filipino silversmith, engraver, and sculptor

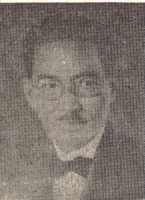
- Born: June 10, 1871; Sampaloc, Manila, Captaincy General of the Philippines
- Died: November 10, 1922 (aged 51)
- Resting place: Manila North Cemetery
- Known for: silversmithing, engraving, sculpting
- Style: Classical, Modernist, Art Nouveau, Art Deco
- Spouse: Pelagia Gotianquin Mendoza (until 1922, his death)
- Children: 8

Crispulo de Guzman Zamora (1871–1922) was a Filipino silversmith, engraver, and sculptor.

== Early life and education ==
Zamora was born on June 10, 1871.

The Zamoras were a prominent family of metalcrafters based in Quiapo, Manila. Tomas Zamora, a relative, runs the Taller de Plateria, Escultura y Grabados in the district.

He would learn the craft where he will be famous in from his own father and became his apprentice. He would get his private education in the arts from a certain Jose Flores and later take formal education at the Academia de Dibujo, Pintura y Grabado (the predecessor of the University of the Philippines College of Fine Arts). His mentors included Lorenzo de Icaza Rocha (painter of Mujer Filipina) for painting, and Melecio M. Figueroa (whose works are depicted and featured in Philippine coins during the Insular, and Commonwealth eras, as well as the Third Republic after American independence) for engraving.

Zamora would later take further studies under painter Felix Lorenzo Martinez at the Escuela Practica y Profesional de Artes Oficios in Manila for the art of casting. After graduating, he would first work with his brothers in their father's workshop. After his father died, he made a name for himself in a separate workshop at Calle Crespo (now Felix R. Hidalgo St.), also in Quiapo, founded in 1890.

== Career ==
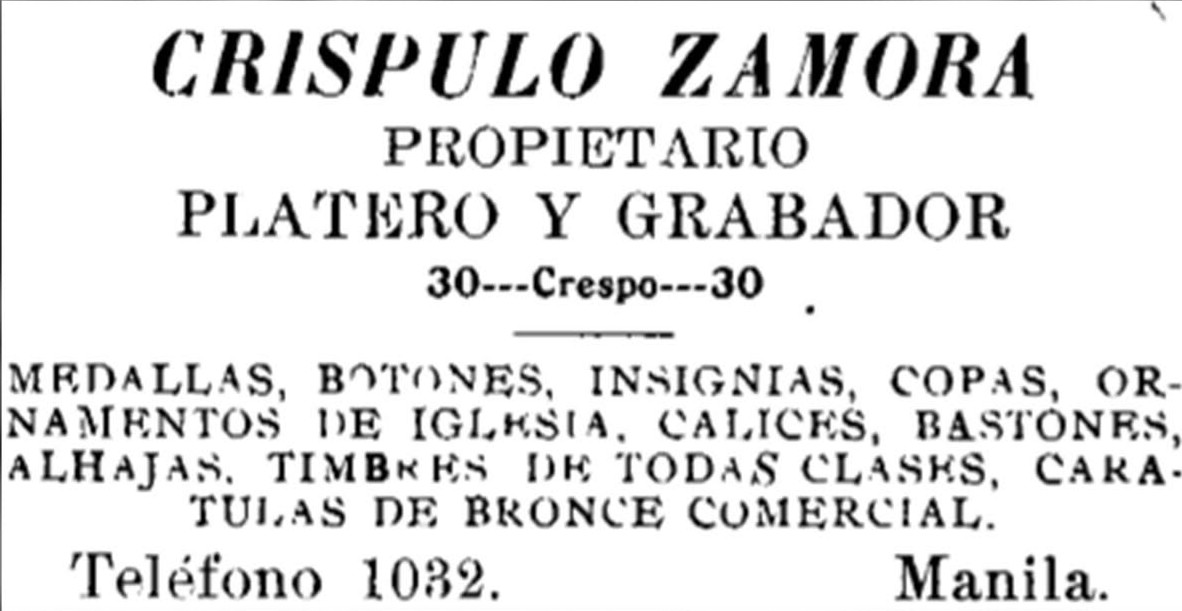
A callcard of the metalcrafting workshop of Crispulo Zamora, 1909

He first dabbled with religious pieces but later focused on medal making. When the Philippine Revolution erupted, Zamora took advantage of the situation and made insignias and decorations for the revolutionary forces. During the Insular, and Commonwealth eras, he designed and manufactured medals for the US Army, the Philippine Constabulary (the country's gendarmerie force, who will later form the core of the present-day Armed Forces of the Philippines), and different units of the Reserve Officers' Training Corps across the nation.

On the sidelines, he also created plaques with images of noted public figures such as American Presidents Theodore Roosevelt, and Woodrow Wilson, the King Alfonso XIII of Spain, and the Taisho Emperor of Japan.

Some of his silverwares were exhibited in the 1904 Louisiana Purchase Exhibition.

He would mark his works, especially in medals, with his full name in two lines, or more discreetly, with his initials "CZ".

Zamora was commissioned to make the bulk of the medals, trophies, and crowns for the Manila Carnival. The most prominent of which were those made for the 1913 edition, which were featured in the newspaper El Renacimiento. He conceptualized a design in which the three regional beauties, each representing the three major island groups of the Philippines, looked radiant as the three stars of the Philippine flag; each of their crowns, therefore, was topped with a star.

In the years that followed, Zamora would hold the monopoly of medal commissions from the organizing body of the Manila Carnival, the Philippine Carnival Association.

His workshop would later be turned into a government-accredited mint, authorized to mass-produce government awards, military insignias, and public monuments. With such distinction, Zamora cemented his name as a gold standard, being a brand people, public or private, can trust when it comes to visual arts.

== Personal life and death ==
Zamora married Pelagia Gotianquin Mendoza (born June 9, 1867), who is historically recognized as the first female sculptor in the Philippines. Zamora met her during his study years at the Academia at 21 years old.

When they married, they decided to merge their talents instead of running two independent careers, by studying the latest technological advancement in the field, which allowed them to modernize their business far beyond the traditional Spanish-colonial methods they learned and applied.

They had eight sons, including Vicente, and Clemente.

Zamora died on October 11, 1922, and was buried at the Manila North Cemetery.

Pelagia and her sons will take over her husband's workshop upon his passing, aptly named Viuda e Hijos de Crispulo Zamora (Widow and Sons of Crispulo Zamora). Pelagia introduced modern techniques she learned from her travels abroad, and leading the business to even greater acclaim, winning multiple awards locally, and internationally.

Pelagia died on March 13, 1939.

The firm, last known to be named as simply Crispulo Zamora & Sons, was awarded as "Engraver of the Year" in 1952.

The Crispulo Zamora & Sons' workshop is last addressed at 431 Sales St., Sta. Cruz, Manila, under the management of 3rd-generation descendant, Eduardo "Dan" Zamora.

== Notable works (self-made, and company-made) ==
=== Religious/Sacramental ===
- the chanter of the Manila Cathedral
- the crown of Our Lady of Penafrancia, Naga City
- the 18-karat gold scepter of Our Lady of La Naval, Manila (now in Quezon City) (1908)

=== Historical/Political/Military ===
- various medals and insignias for the Philippine Revolutionary Army (1896–1898)
- silver, and bronze medals commemorating the First Philippine Assembly, and the visit of then-Secretary of War William Howard Taft (1907)
- the bust of President Manuel L. Quezon at the Quezon Institute
- various Rizal Day commemorative coins
- the Quince Martires Monument, Naga City
- various medals, and crowns of the Manila Carnival
- the third version of the Medal of Valor, the Philippine military's highest award for bravery (1935)
- Japanese commemoration medals for their capture of Bataan and Corregidor, commissioned by General Masaharu Homma during World War II (1942); these were believed to be struck over salvaged silver coins that Filipino and American forces threw into Manila Bay, which was ordered by the Japanese to be salvaged.
- Philippine flag pins in celebration of the Second Philippine Republic (1943)
- the inaugural coat of arms of the Central Bank of the Philippines (1949)
- the bronze marker of the Gomburza National Monument, Plaza Roma, Intramuros, Manila (later moved outside Intramuros, near in front of the National Museum of Fine Arts) (1972)

=== Commercial/Private ===
- bust relief of Don Ildefonso Tambunting/Tan Bun Ting (of the Tambunting Pawnshop fame), Tambunting Family Mausoleum, Manila Chinese Cemetery
- the National Collegiate Athletic Association Season 31 basketball championship trophy (won by San Beda College) (1955)
