= Fort San Felipe (Cavite) =

Military fortress in Cavite, Philippines

- La Fortaleza de San Felipe
- Part of Naval Base Cavite
- Cavite City in the Philippines
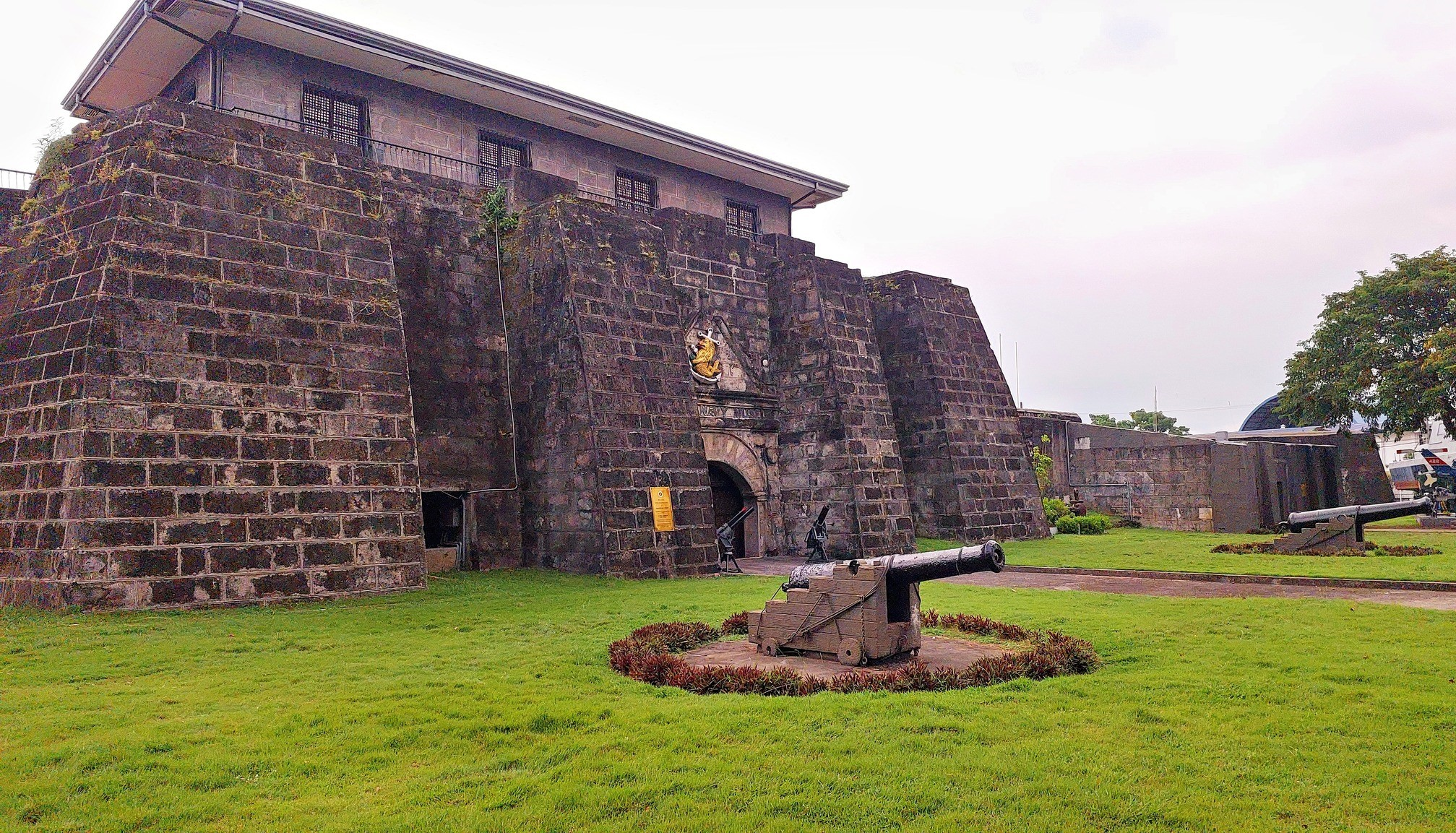
- Fort San Felipe circa 2024

Site information
- Type: Fortress
- Owner: Government of the Philippines
- Controlled by: Philippine Navy
- Open to the public: No
- Condition: Partly demolished in the early 20th century

Location
- Location of Fort San Felipe in the Philippines Fort San Felipe (Luzon) Fort San Felipe (Philippines)
- Coordinates: 14°28′54.5″N 120°55′0″E

Site history
- Built: 1609
- Built by: Spanish East Indies
- Materials: Granite and concrete
- Battles/wars: Battle of Manila Bay
- Events: Cavite mutiny of 1872; Execution of the Thirteen Martyrs of Cavite in 1896

Fort San Felipe (Spanish: Fortaleza de San Felipe; Filipino: Moog ng San Felipe Neri) is a military fortress in Cavite City, Philippines. It was constructed by the Spanish military in 1609 in the first port town of Cavite, the historic core of the present and larger Cavite City, for its protection. Less than half of the original historic structure survives today. The remaining structure is made of granite blocks with 30-foot high walls and features a wide stairway leading to the top of the bastions and remaining walls. Naval memorabilia including antique cannons and cannonballs decorate the lawns of the fortification. Fort San Felipe is located within the 9-hectare (22-acre) Naval Base Cavite of the Philippine Navy and is not open to the public.

At present, the name Fort San Felipe also refers to the area of the present Cavite City where the first historic port town Cavite (also known as Cavite Nuevo then Cavite Puerto) and the Cavite Arsenal (now Naval Base Cavite) were located. It is now part of the San Roque district of Cavite City.

== History ==
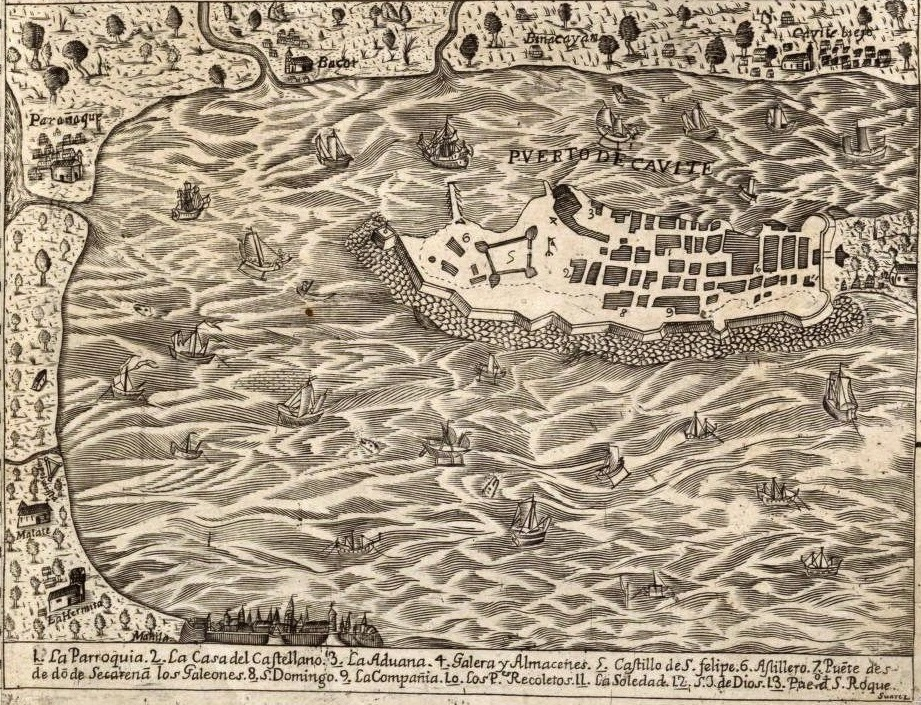
Illustration of the Port of Cavite from the Carta Hydrographica y Chorographica de las Yslas Filipinas (1734). Fort San Felipe is the diamond-shaped structure.

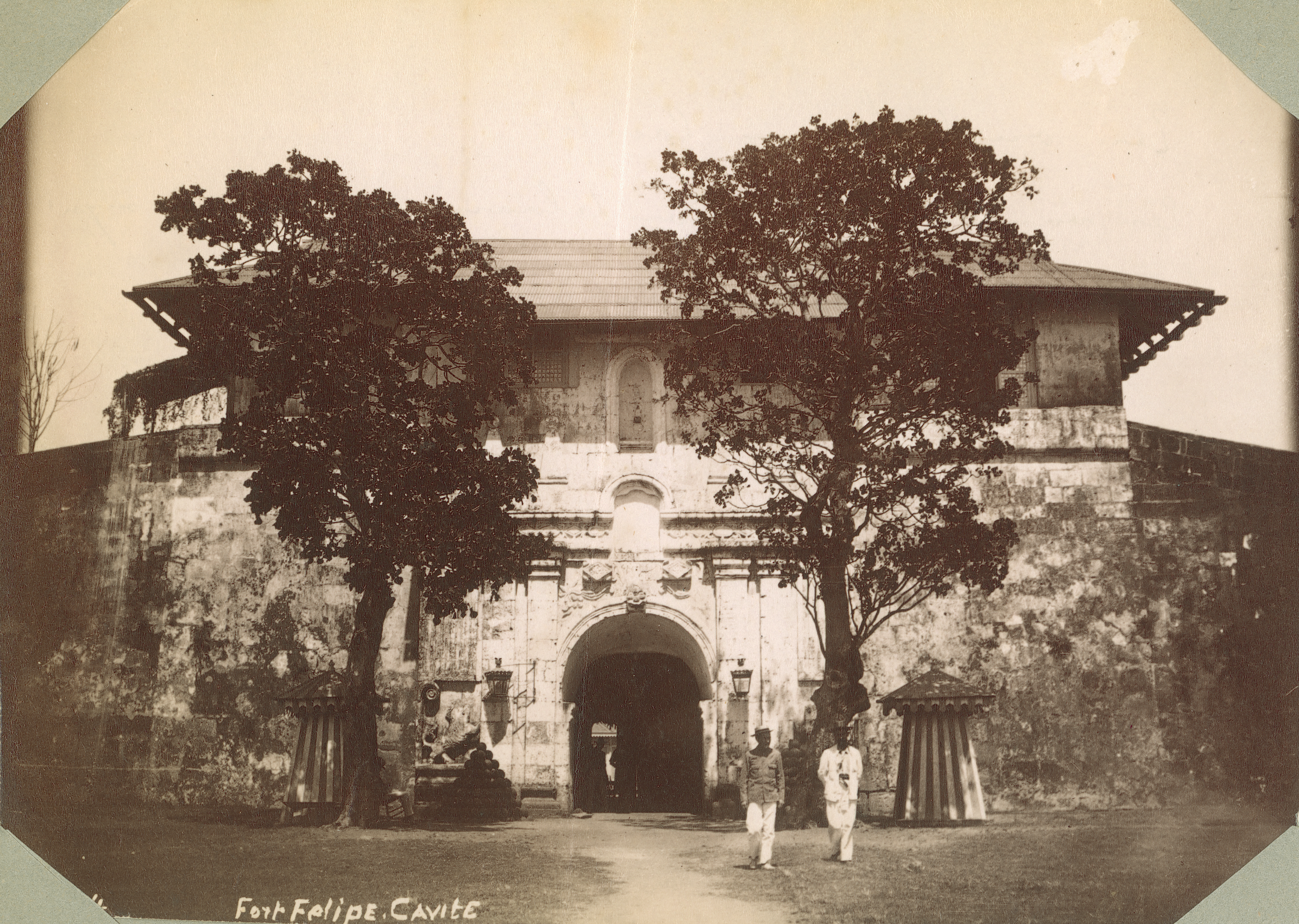
Fort San Felipe, circa pre-1900

As early as 1591, Governor-General Gómez Pérez Dasmariñas recognized the strategic importance of Cavite Puerto as the gateway to the City of Manila and moved toward its fortification. It was in fact at this isthmus, two decades earlier, that Miguel López de Legazpi hid his ships prior to the attack in Manila.

=== Construction ===
Constructed between 1609 and 1616, Fort San Felipe is the first military fortress built in the province of Cavite during the time of Governor Juan de Silva. According to a report in 1659 of Governor Sabiniano Manrique de Lara: "it was quadrilateral in form, with four corner bastions, and had a perimeter of 220 feet (67 m). It was built to face the Cavite Port and Manila. Furthermore, a cube or platform enough for 10 cannons and named Santa Catalina the Martyr was nearby. Facing San Felipe were the ruins of the casa real which had another low platform for eight cannons. However, it was in bad state and had to be repaired."

In August 1663, Governor Sabiniano Manrique de Lara ordered the construction of a platform at the entrance of Fort San Felipe that would handle 10 cannons. After some years, four more platforms followed, each named after Catholic saints.

From 1679 to 1688, the fort was used as a prison for Fernando de Valenzuela, former valido to Queen Regent Mariana of Austria.

=== Cavite mutiny of 1872 ===
The Cavite Mutiny of 1872 was an uprising of military personnel of the Spanish arsenal in Cavite including Fort San Felipe, on January 20, 1872. Around 200 soldiers and laborers led by Sergeant Francisco La Madrid rose up in the belief that it would elevate a national uprising. The event led to the killing of the governor of the fort but was quickly suppressed on January 22. Government troops executed many of the participants and began to crack down on a burgeoning nationalist movement The uprising also resulted in the unjust implication and the tragic execution by garrote of Filipino priests Mariano Gómez, José Burgos, and Jacinto Zamora on February 17, 1872.

Many scholars believe that the Cavite Mutiny of 1872 was the beginning of Filipino nationalism that eventually lead to the Philippine Revolution of 1896.

=== The Cavite conspiracy ===
On September 12, 1896, at 12:45 p.m., thirteen Filipino patriots were taken to the Plaza de Armas, outside Fort San Felipe, and were executed by musketry. The thirteen were leaders of the foiled uprising planned at the Cavite Arsenal on September 3. After the Spanish authorities learned about the plan from a Filipino dressmaker, they immediately arrested Severino Lapidario, Alfonso de Ocampo and Luis Aguado. The rest were rounded up on September 3 after their names were revealed by De Ocampo after being tortured. The group of heroes is now collectively known as the Thirteen Martyrs of Cavite.

Among the revolutionaries captured were musician Julián Felipe (who would compose the Philippine national anthem the following year). Felipe was incarcerated for nine months at Fort San Felipe. Also subsequently released were Pablo and Marcos José, and Juan Castañeda of Imus.

=== American colonial period ===
During the early years of the American occupation, the only remaining parts of the fort were the façade, the main entrance with flanking curtain walls, and the two bastions at the ends. The rest were demolished by the Americans in the early 20th century to make way for a naval station. The fort is presently located inside Naval Base Cavite, which is off limits to the general public.

== See also ==
- Philippine Navy
- Armed Forces of the Philippines
- Naval Base Manila
