= Fifteen Martyrs of Bicol =

Group killed by Spain in the Philippines in 1897

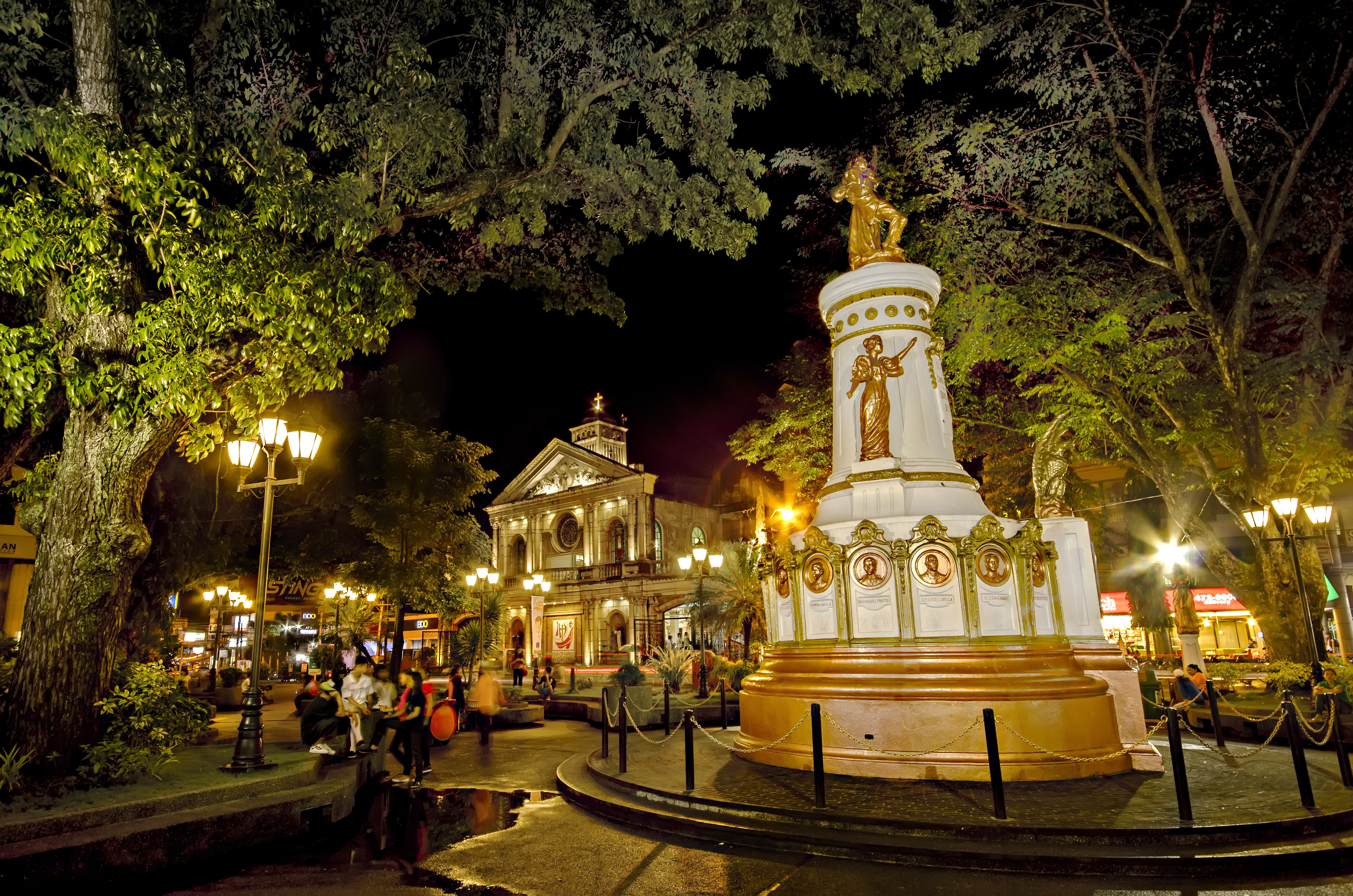
A monument dedicated to "Ang Quince Martires ng Bicol

The Fifteen Martyrs of Bicol (Spanish: Quince Martires del Bicolandia) were Filipino patriots in Bicol, Philippines who were executed by firing squad on January 4, 1897, for cooperating with the Katipunan during the Philippine Revolution against Spain.

== The Martyrs ==
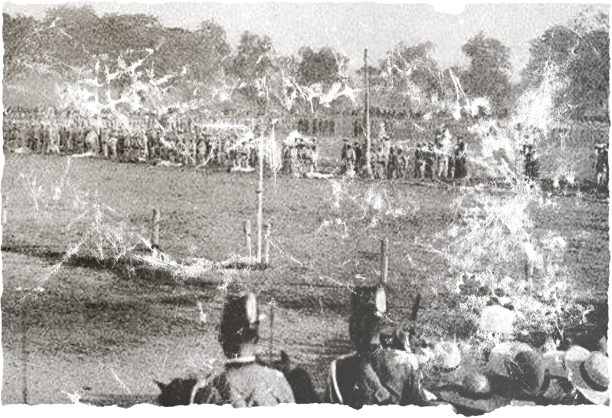
A photograph that depicts the execution of the 11 Martyrs of Bicol

11 of the 15 were executed at the Luneta in Manila.

- Inocencio Herrera - a native of Pateros, he grew up in the Bicol Region and enrolled in the seminary of Nueva Caceres (now Naga, Camarines Sur). He was a brilliant young man and had always topped his class. Gifted with a good voice, he became the choir master of the Metropolitan Cathedral of Nueva Caceres. He was only 23 years old when the Spaniards executed him.
- Gabriel Prieto - He demonstrated unusual wit and intelligence. He was a consistent scholar at the Holy Rosary Seminary, where he studied for the priesthood. After his ordination, he was appointed by Herrera as his adviser and confidential secretary. Prieto was denounced by the Spanish friars for his liberal and independent ideas.
- Severino Diaz - He was born in Bulan, Sorsogon of poor but hardworking parents. He was a model student at the seminary and later as parish priest of Nueva Caceres. He attended to his flock with extraordinary zeal. People remember him as the man who rebuilt and improved the Naga Cathedral. The Spanish friars were jealous of him for becoming the first Filipino Cura Paroco of Nueva Caceres. He was 45 years old when he was executed at the Luneta.
- Manuel Abella - A native of Catanauan, Quezon, was a wealthy Bicolano rice and abaca farmer and trader known for his philanthropic activities among the poor and underprivileged. He was 60 years old when he faced the firing squad in Bagumbayan.
- Domingo Abella - A son of Manuel Abella and a large landowner in Bicol. Frank and outspoken, he took every opportunity to denounce the abuses and arrogance of the Spaniards. He was only 25 when he was executed at the Luneta.
- Camilo Jacob - A commercial photographer and native of Polangui, Albay. Like Domingo Abella, he was open-hearted. Suspected of conniving with the revolutionists, Jacob was tortured and starved to death in prison.
- Tomas Prieto - A brother of Gabriel Prieto. A pharmacist, he was popular with the common people for his liberal and progressive ideas. He was executed at the age of 30.
- Florendo Lerma - A theater owner and playwright from Quiapo, Manila, he went to Bicol at the age of 15 and established the first movie house in Naga.
- Macario Valentin - He was chief of the night patrol in Naga. He took advantage of his position by siding with the revolutionists, whom he supplied with valuable information about the activities of the Spanish militia.
- Mariano Melgarejo - A native of Naga. In his diary, he wrote: "I look forward to the day when Filipinas takes her place among the free nations of the world."
- Cornelio Mercado - An employee in the public works department of Nueva Caceres.

The four Bicolano freedom fighters who were either exiled or died in prison were:

- Leon Hernandez - A resident of Libmanan, Camarines Sur, who was well-to-do and highly influential. He was thrown into the municipal jail in Nueva Caceres, where he was tortured to death for denying participation in the revolutionary movement.
- Ramon Abella - Also a son of Manuel Abella, who was executed at the Luneta. He was a strong advocate of the progressive and independent aspiration of his father.
- Mariano Arana - A government surveyor who died in exile on Bioko Island (then Fernando Po).
- Mariano Ordenanza - A clerk in the Bureau of Public Works. He died in jail in Manila shortly after he was sentenced to 20 years imprisonment by the Spanish Council of War.

== Legacy ==
While the heroic deeds and martyrdom of secular priests Mariano Gomez, Jose Burgos and Jacinto Zamora are well-known across the Philippines, the memory of the 15 martyrs of Bicolandia is confined to Naga City, the heart of Bicol. For more than 70 years, the people of Naga City and nearby municipalities have been paying tribute to these martyrs every fourth day of January. During the incumbency of the late Camarines Sur Governor Julian Ocampo, a monument was erected in Naga City in memory of the Quince Martires del Bicolandia. The monument, located in the heart of the city, was formally dedicated on November 30, 1923, and was sculpted by the firm of Crispulo Zamora of Quiapo, Manila.

Official recognition of the 15 martyrs of Bicolandia came only on February 20, 1950 when the director of the Department of Education added to the list of significant dates in Philippine history January 4, 1897, the day when Filipino freedom fighters from the Bicol region were executed.

== Gallery ==
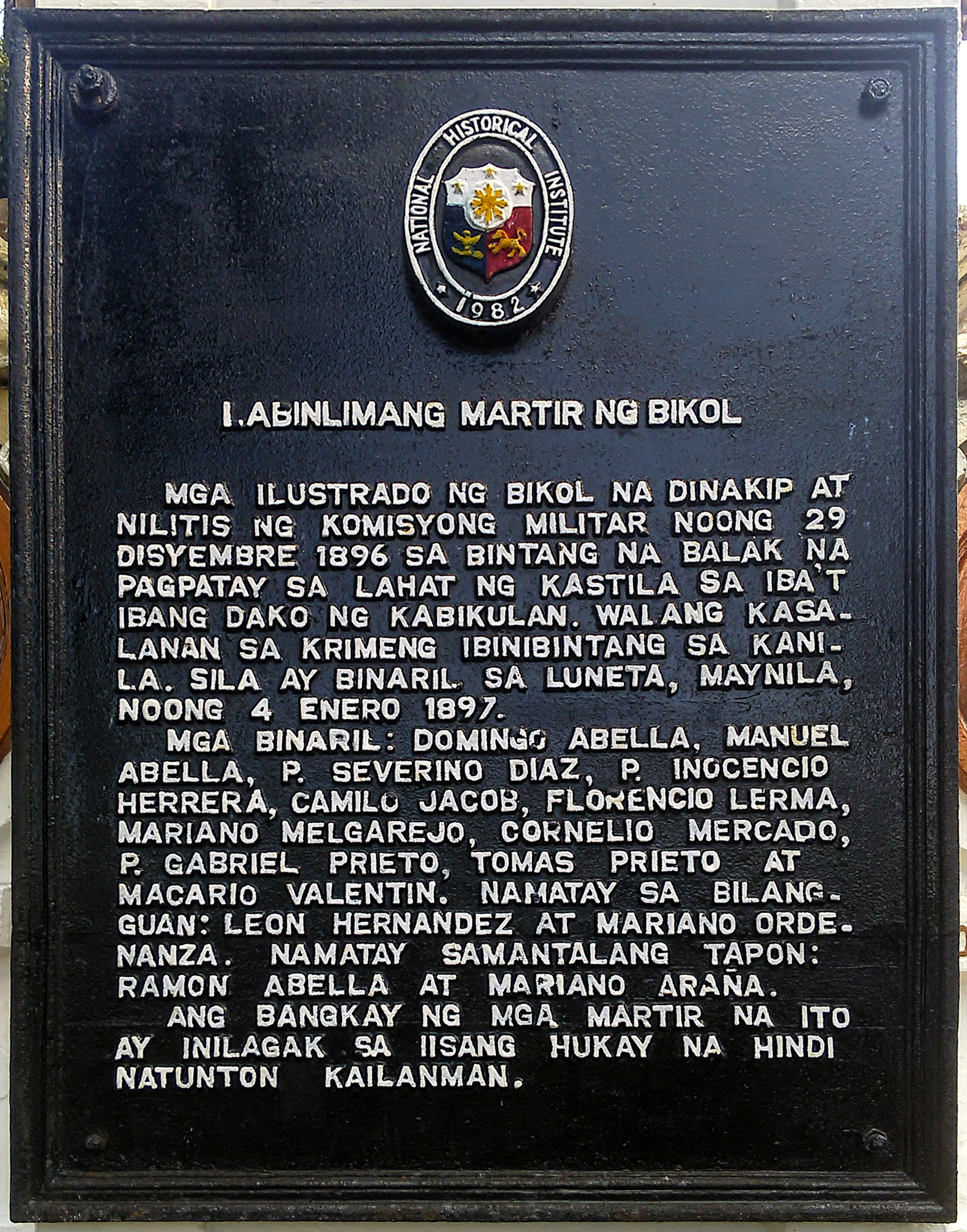
Quince Martires Monuments NHI marker

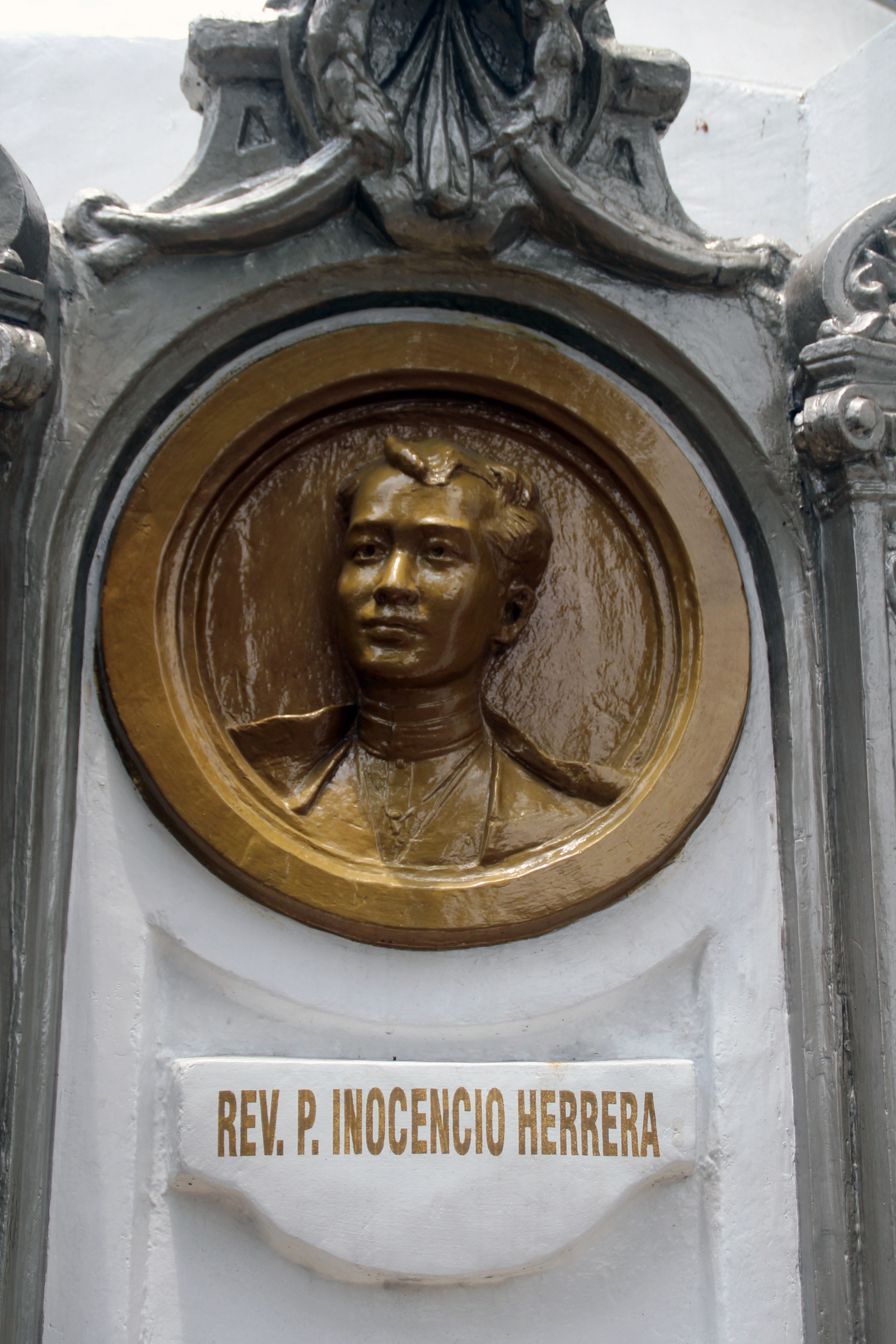
Rev P Inocencio Herrera

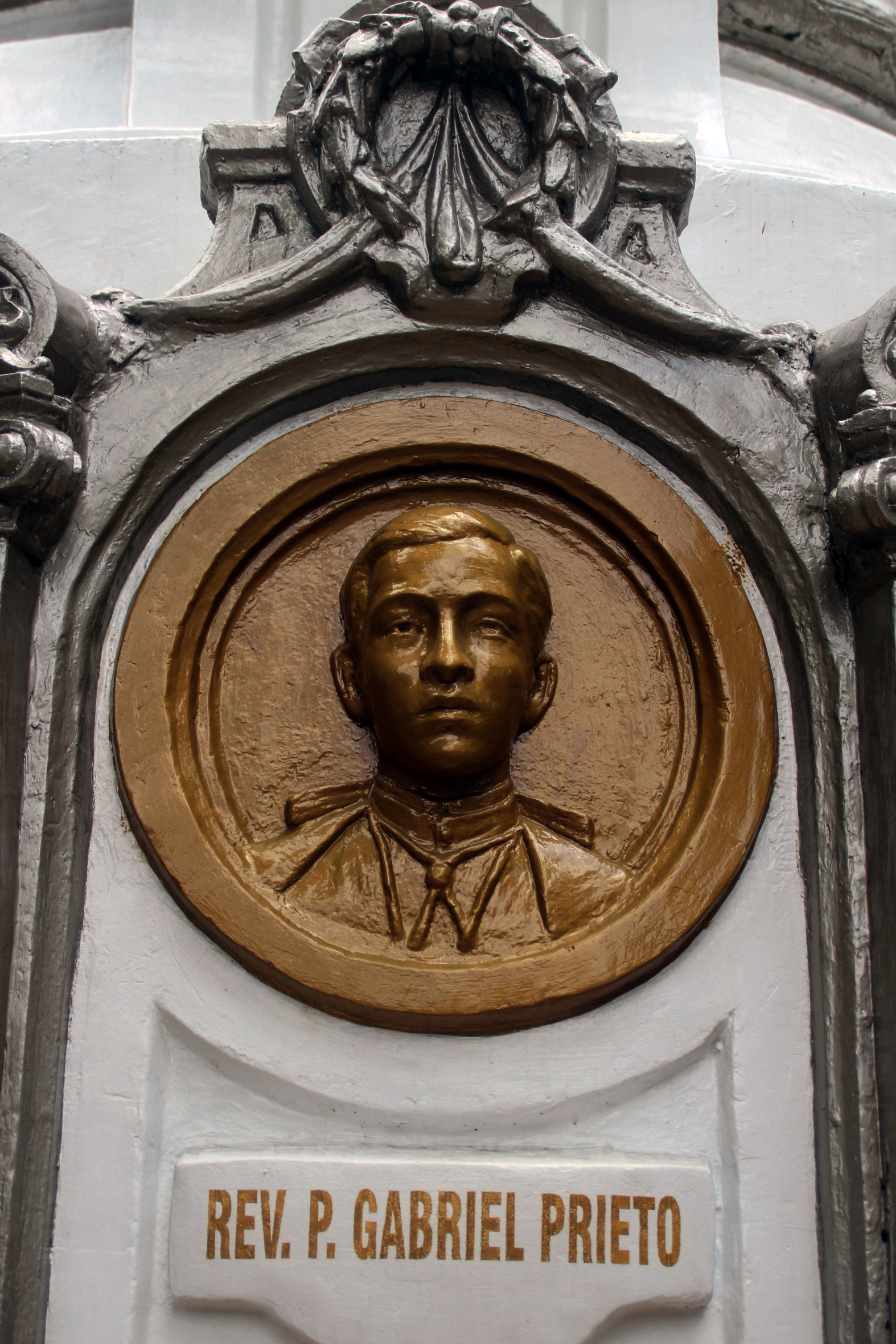
Rev P Gabriel Prieto

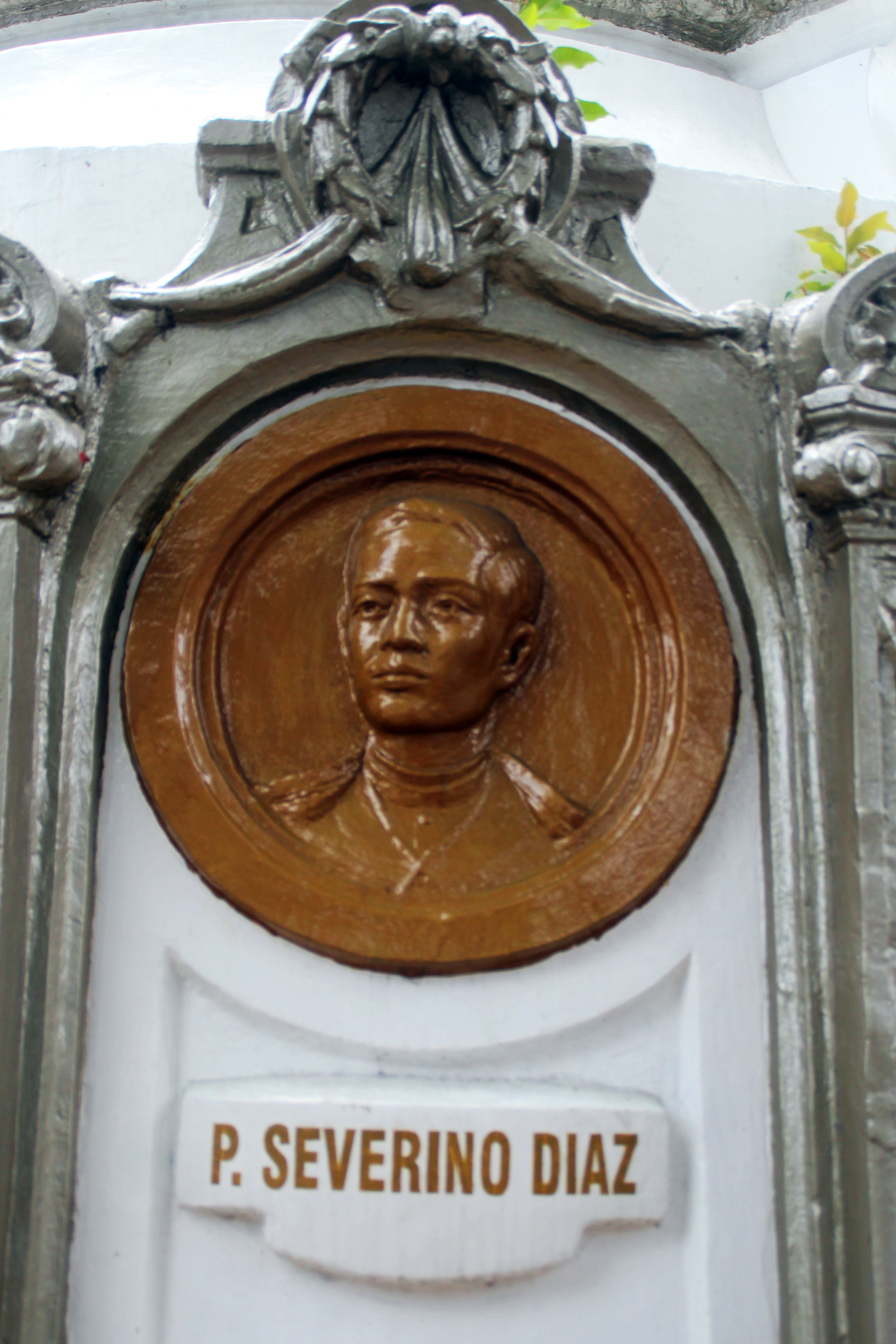
P Severino Diaz

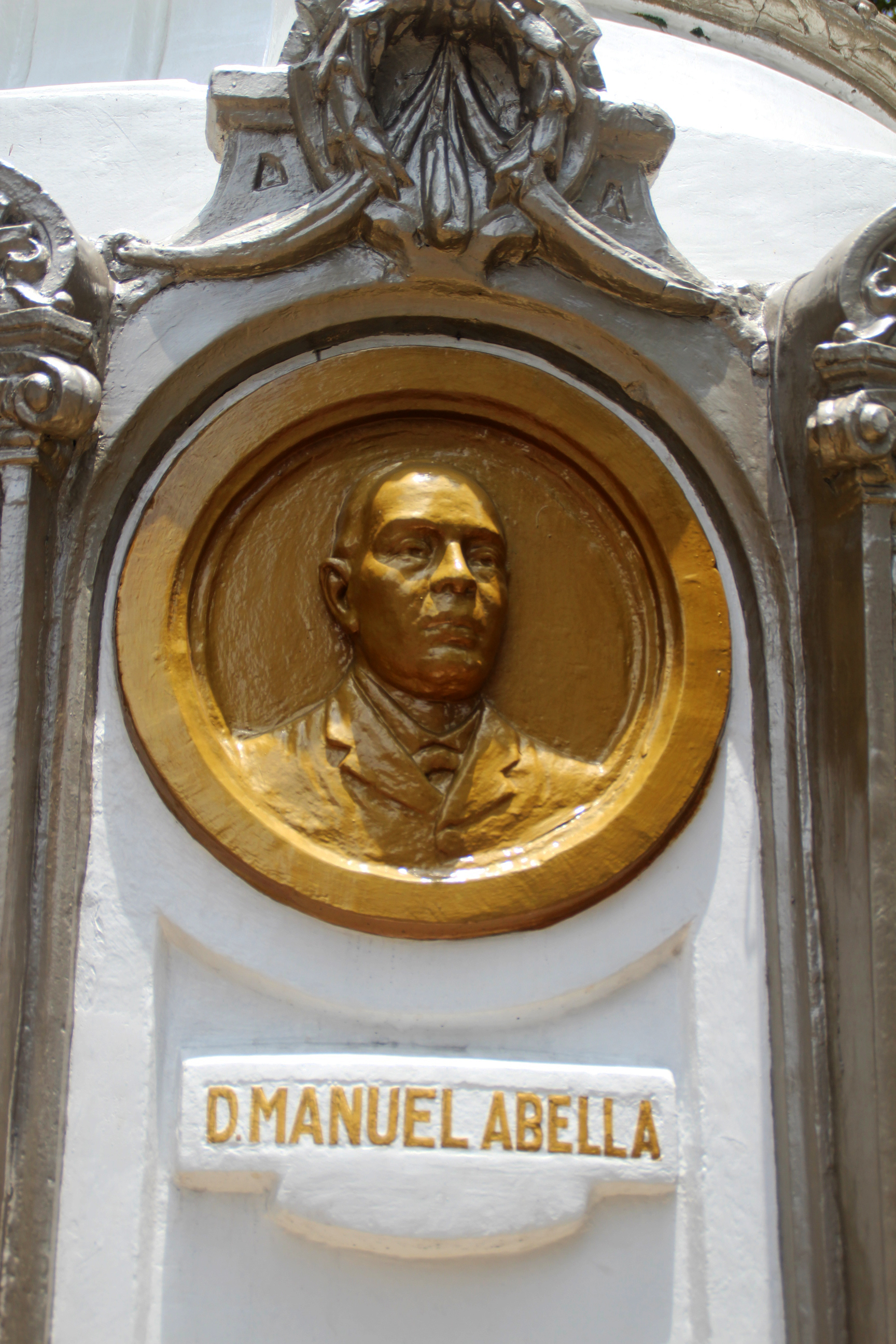
Don Manuel Abella

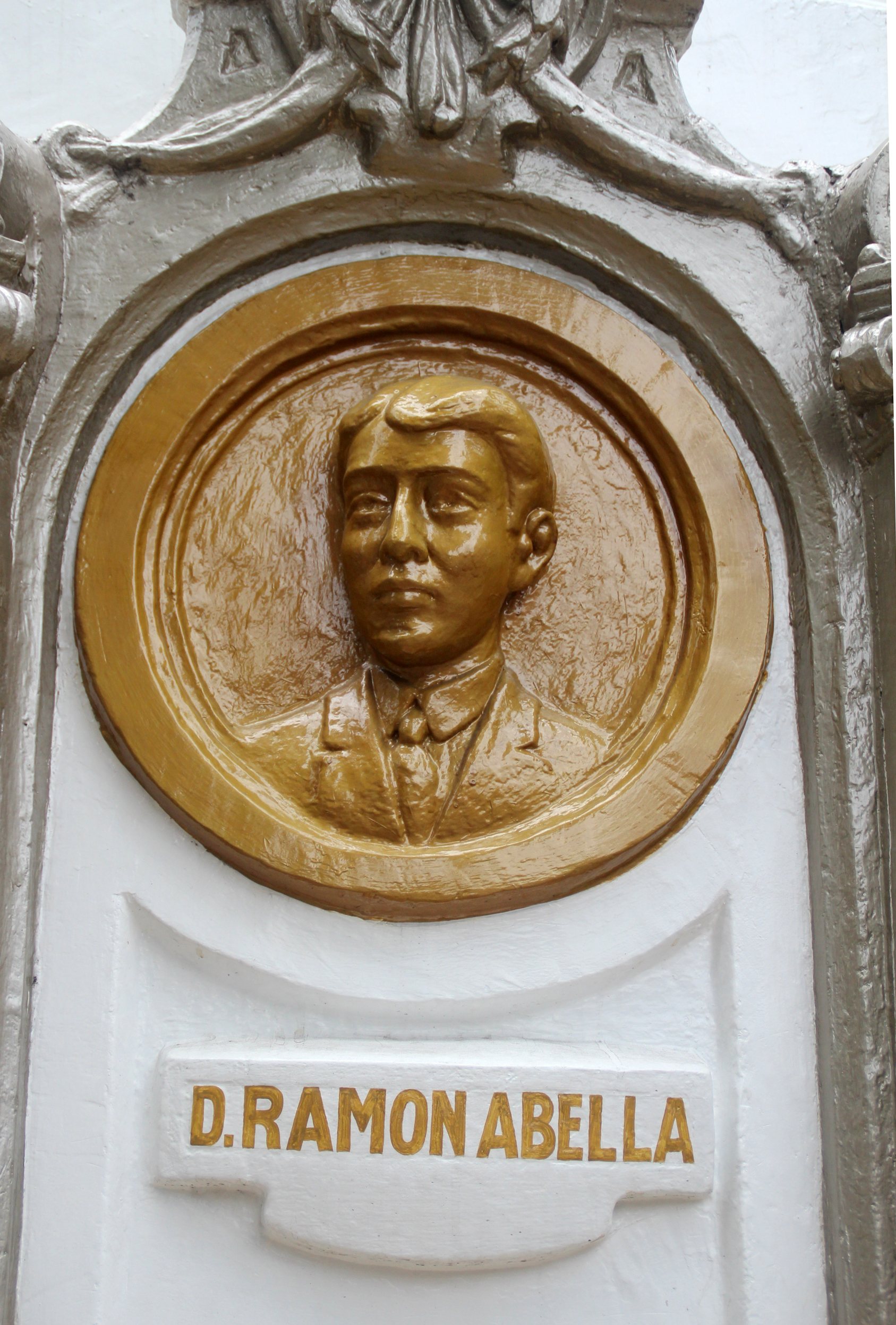
Don Ramon Abella

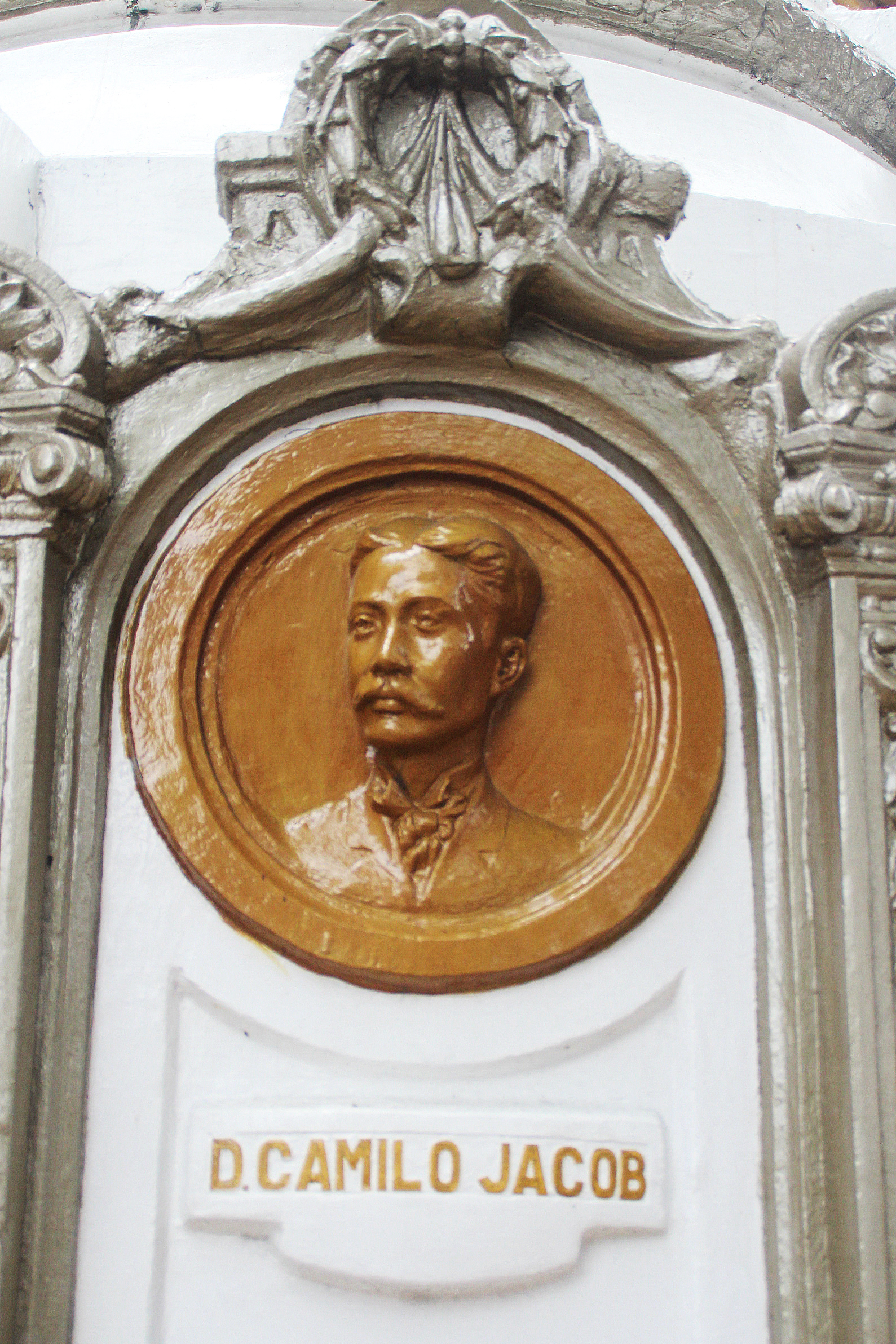
Don Camilo Jacob

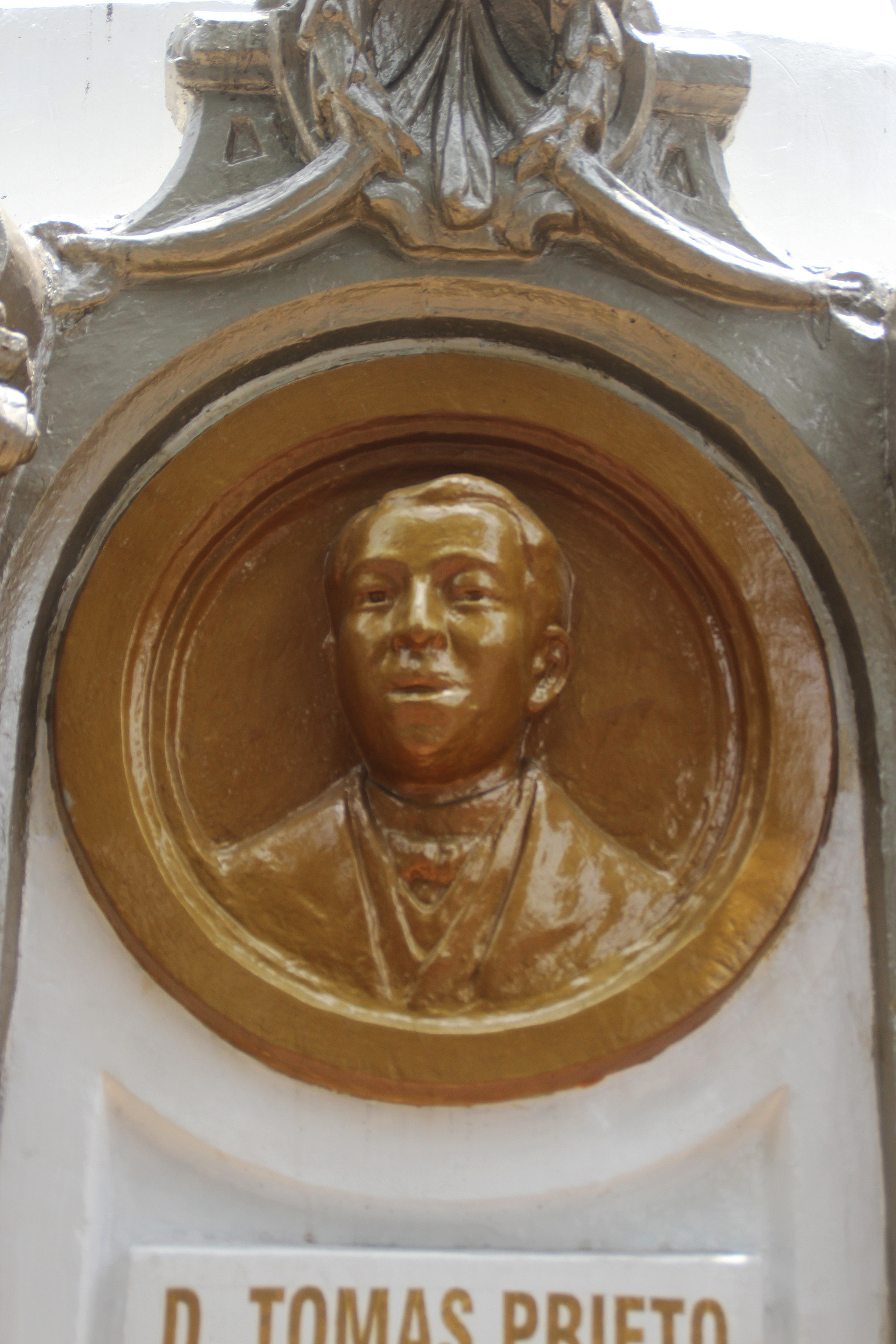
Don Tomas Prieto

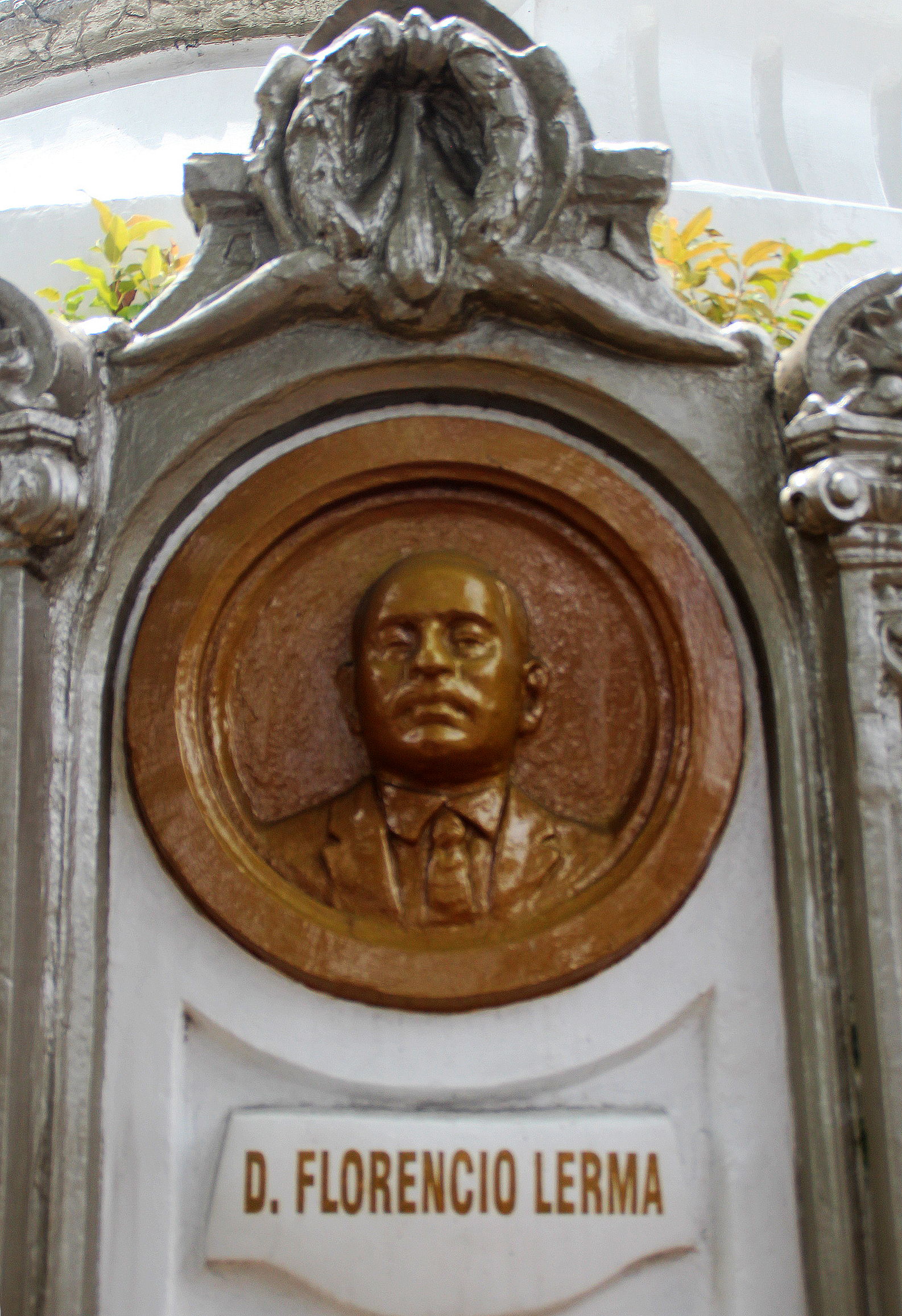
Don Florencio Lerma

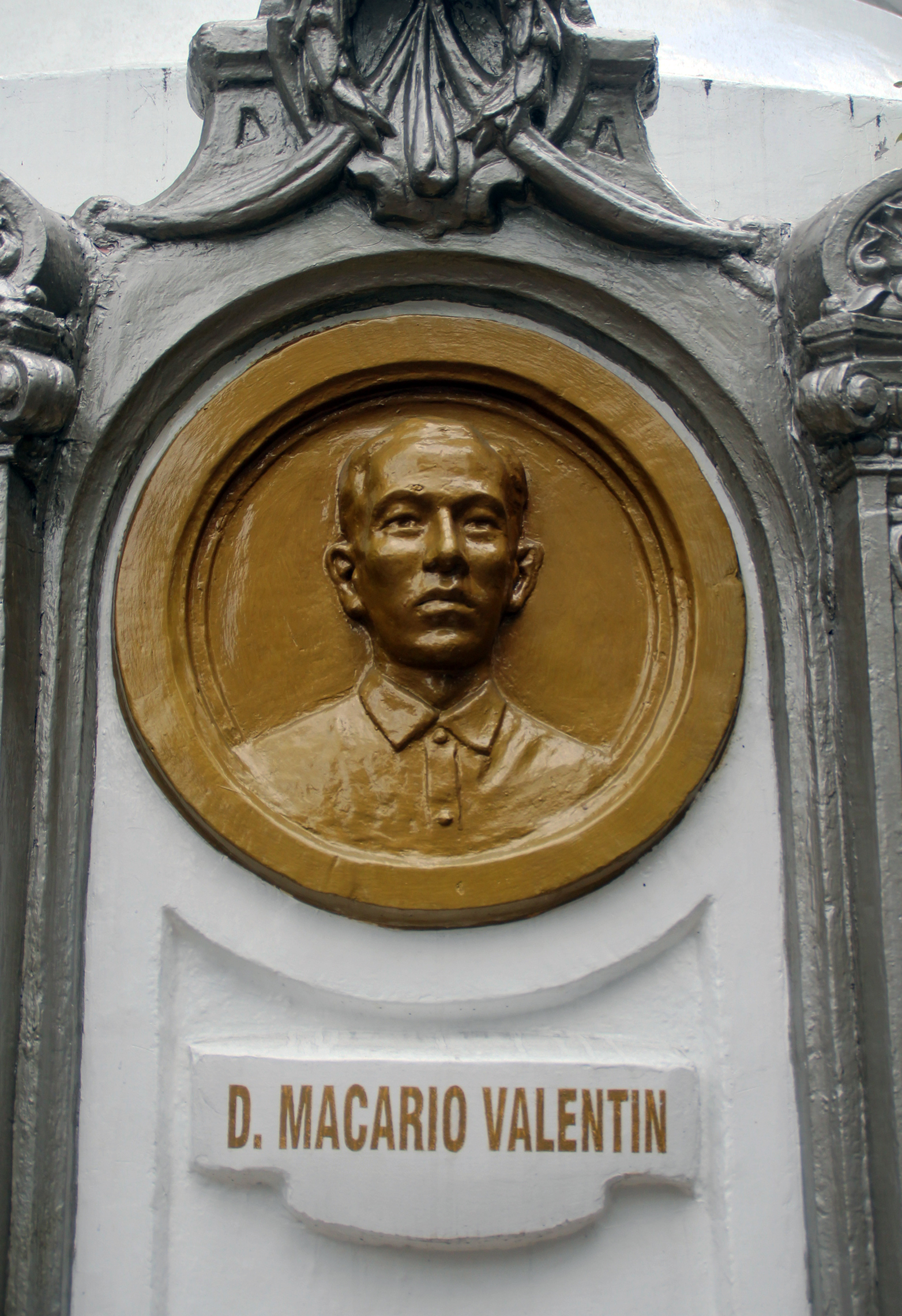
Don Martin Valentin

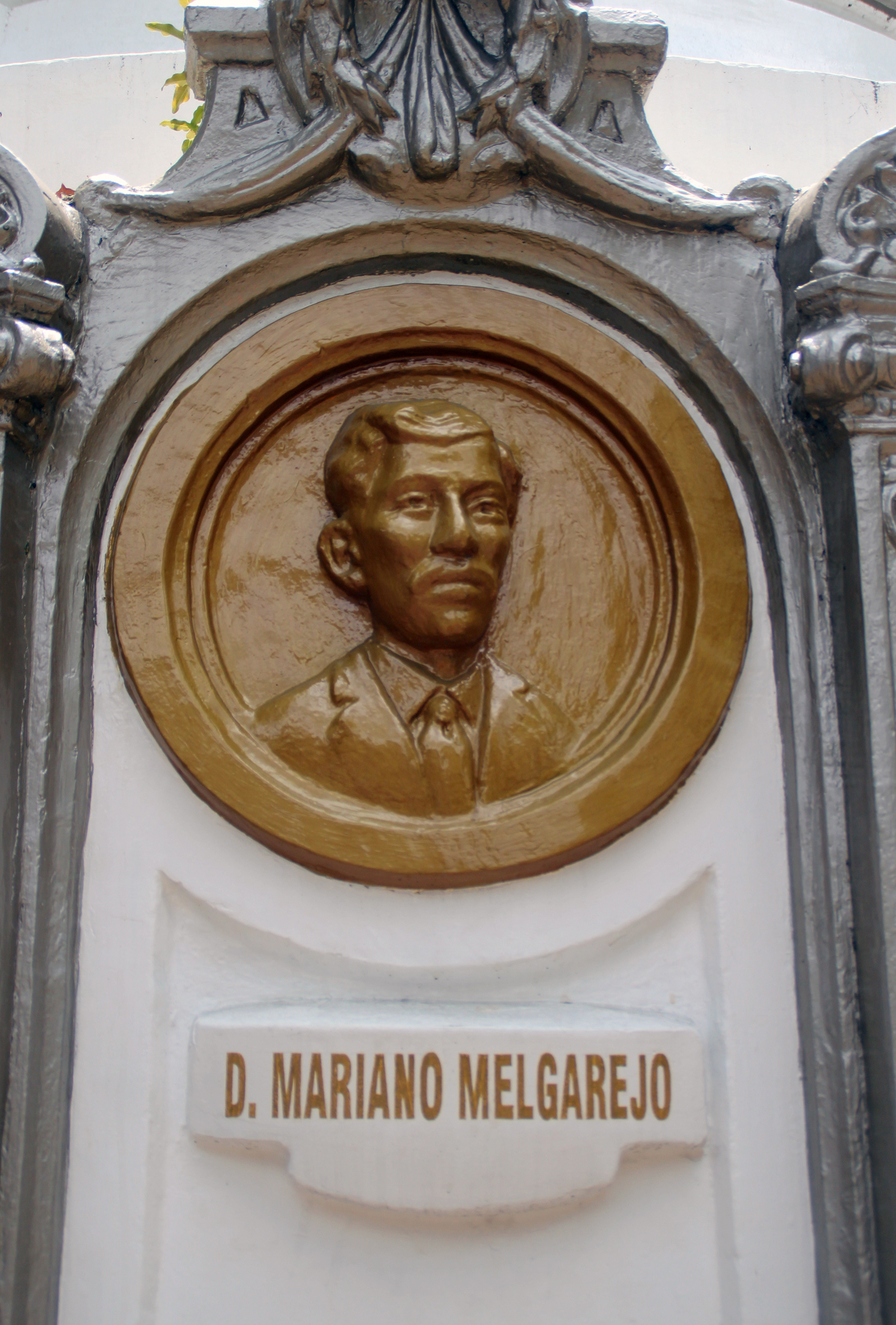
Don Mariano Melgarejo

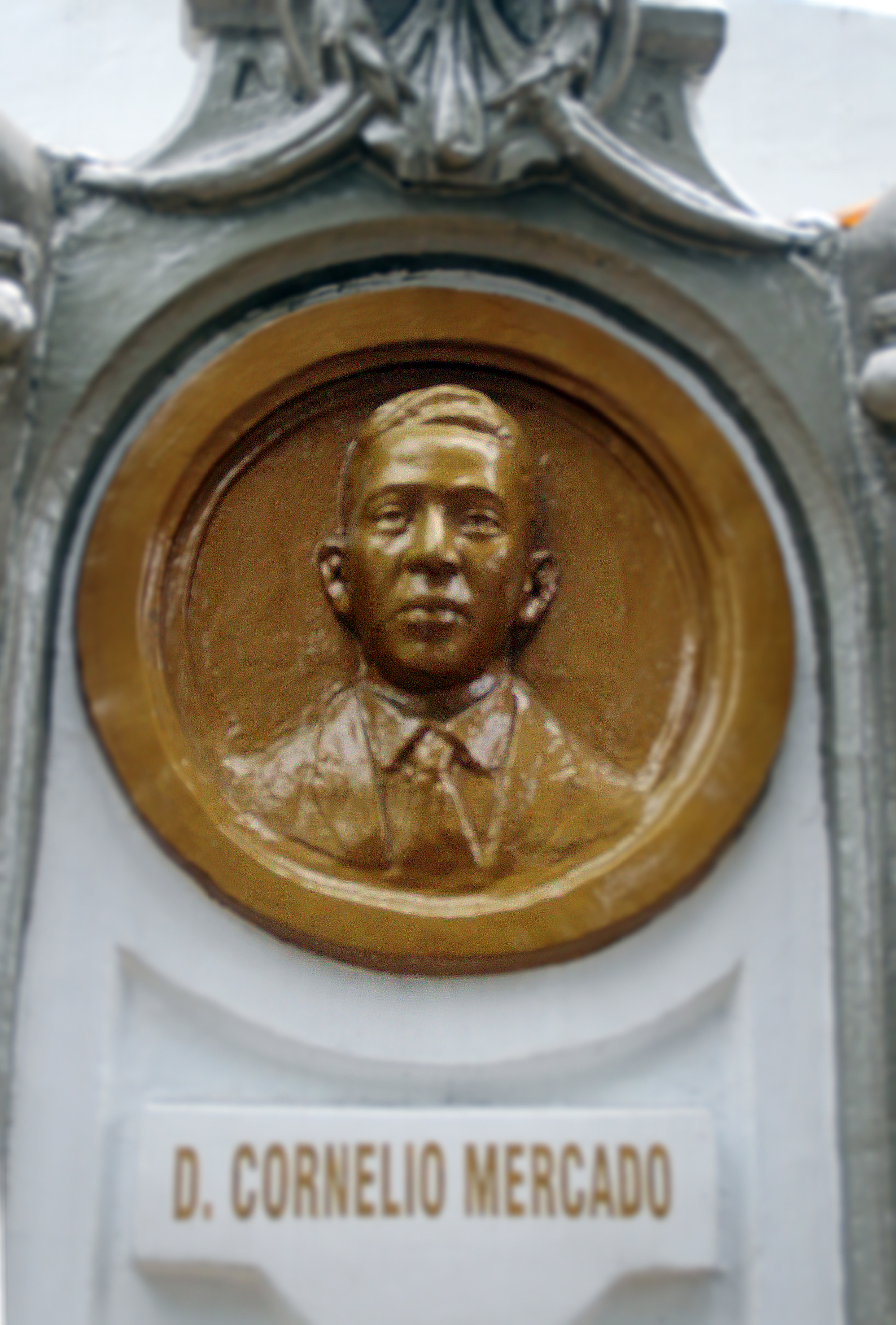
Don Cornelio Mercado

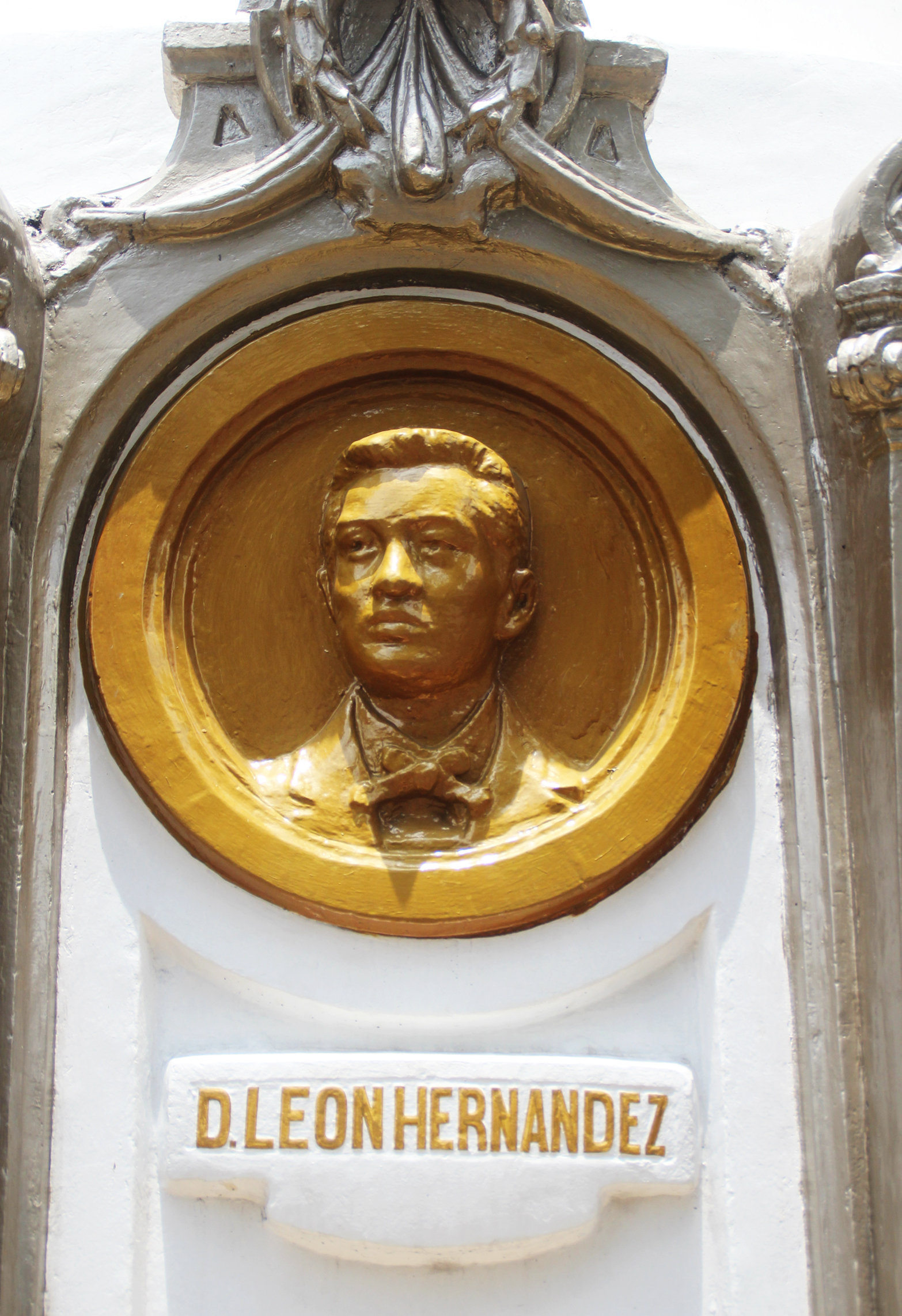
Don Leon Hernandez

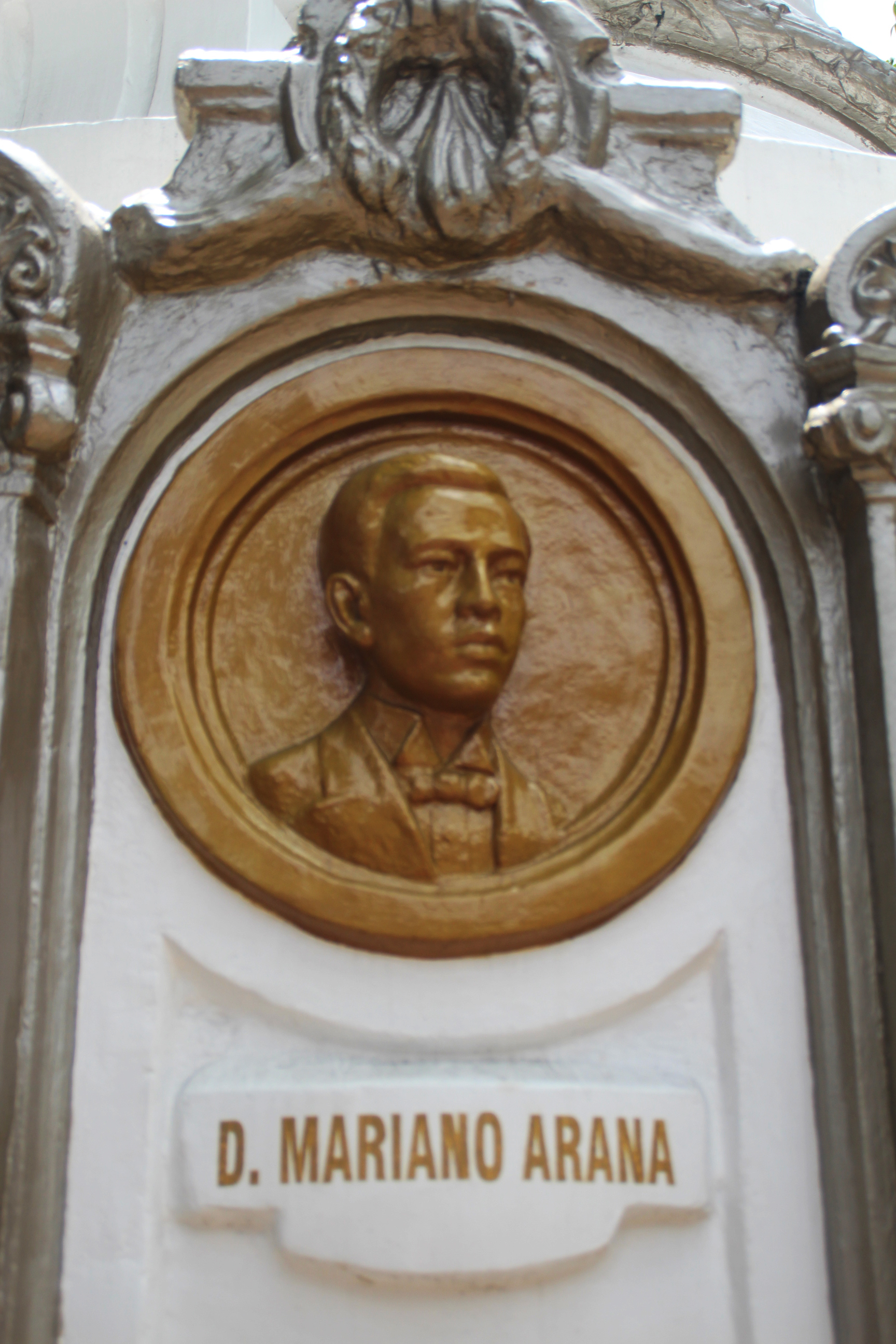
Don Mariano Arana

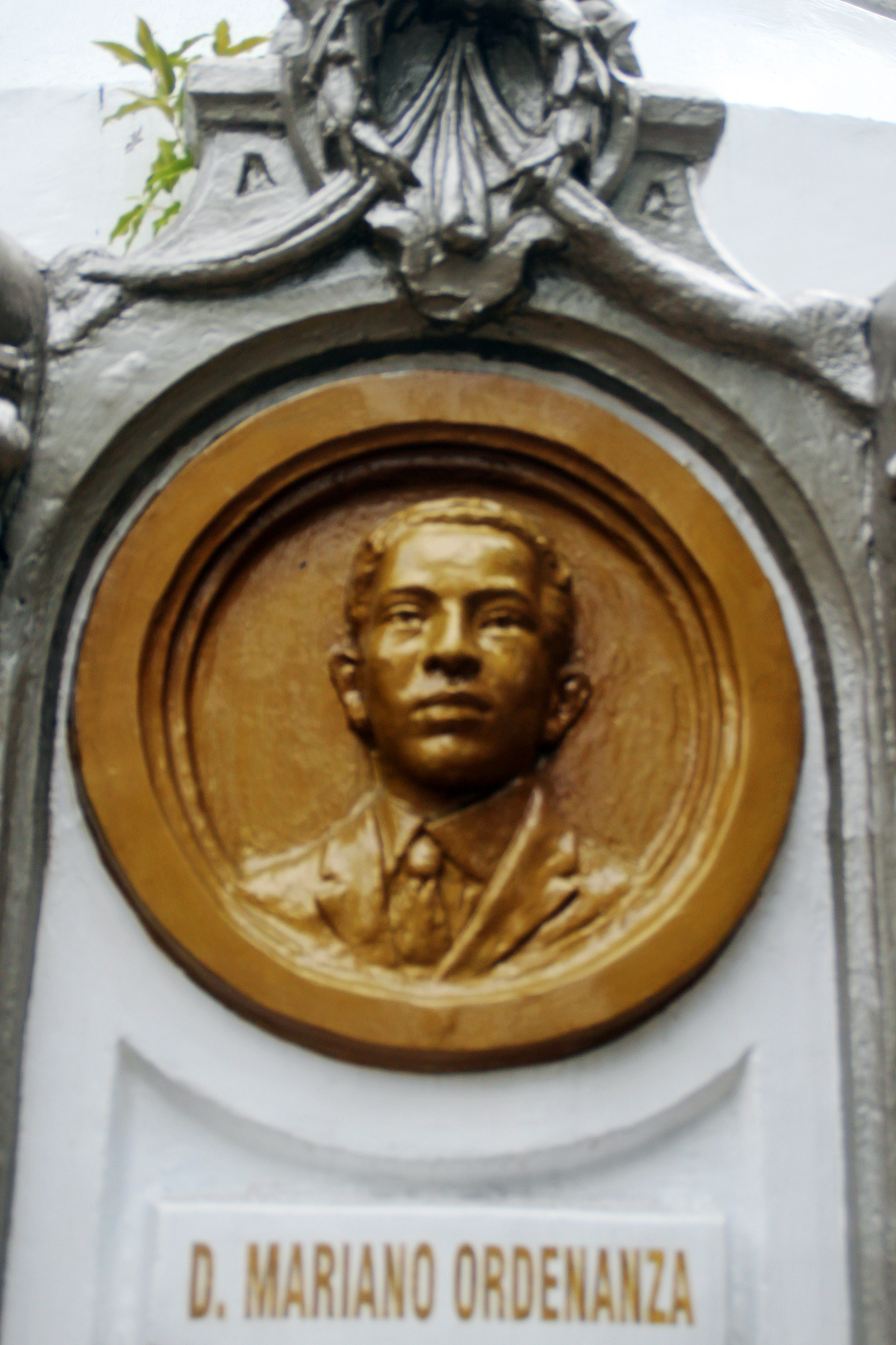
Don Mariano Ordenanza

== See also ==
- Philippine Revolution
- Thirteen Martyrs of Cavite
- Thirteen Martyrs of Bagumbayan
- Nineteen Martyrs of Aklan
