= Thirteen Martyrs of Cavite =

Philippine nationalists executed in 1896

The Thirteen Martyrs of Cavite (Filipino: Labintatlong Martir ng Kabite; Spanish: Trece Mártires de Cavite) were Filipino patriots in Cavite, Philippines who were executed by firing squad on September 12, 1896, for cooperating with the Katipunan during the Philippine Revolution against Spain. The de facto capital city of Trece Martires in Cavite is named after them.

== The martyrs ==
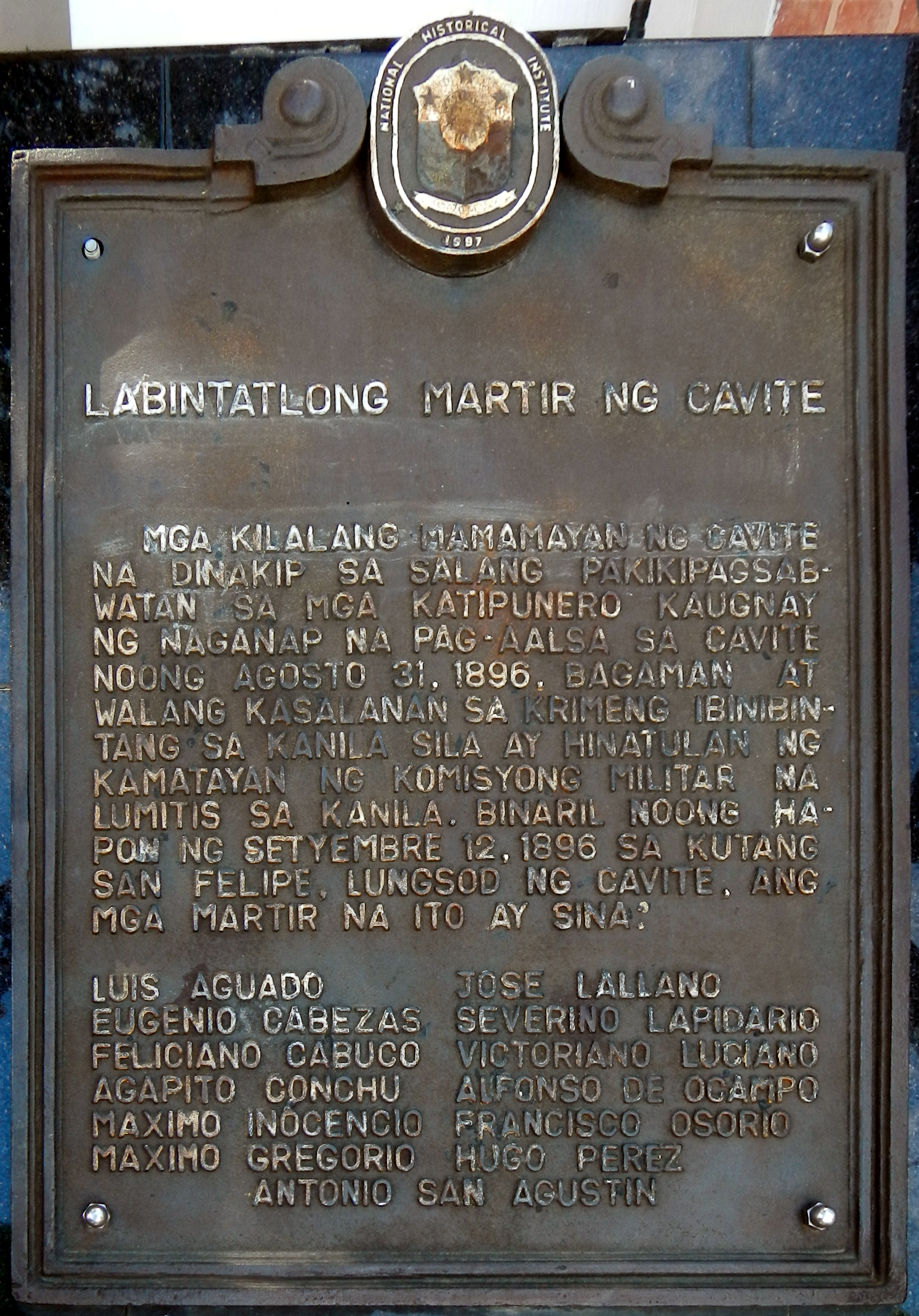
The historical marker of the monument in Trece Martires

The Thirteen Martyrs	Birthdate	Birthplace	Notes
Luis Aguado	1863	Bacoor, Cavite	He was the son of a captain in the Spanish Navy. He would later become supply chief of the Spanish arsenal in Fort San Felipe in the town of Cavite (now Cavite City). He was married to Felisa Osorio, sister of Francisco Osorio and oldest daughter of Antonio Osorio, a Chinese-Filipino businessman reputed to be the richest man in Cavite at that time. Aguado's widow would later marry Daniel Tirona.
Eugenio Cabezas	1855	Santa Cruz, Manila	He was a goldsmith who was a Freemason and Katipunero. He was married to Luisa Antonio of Cavite by whom he had seven children. He owned a jewellery and watch repair shop on Calle Real (now called Trece Martires Avenue) in Cavite which was used by the Katipunan as a meeting place.
Feliciano Cabuco	June 9, 1865	Caridad, Cavite Puerto	He was born to a wealthy family in Cavite el Viejo (now Kawit). He worked in a hospital. He was married to Marcela Bernal of Caridad by whom he had two sons.
Agapito Conchu	August 18, 1860	Guagua, Pampanga	A native of Binondo, Manila who migrated to Cavite and became a schoolteacher, musician, photographer, painter and lithographer.
Alfonso de Ocampo	1860	Cavite	He was a Spanish mestizo, who had been sergeant in the Spanish army before his appointment as assistant provincial jail warden. He was both a Freemason and Katipunero. He was married to Ana Espíritu by whom he had two children.
Máximo Gregorio	November 18, 1856	Pasay, Manila	He was drafted into the Spanish colonial army while he was studying at the Colegio de San Juan de Letrán. After training in San Antonio, Cavite, he was inducted into the 72nd Regiment of the Spanish Army and dispatched to Jolo, Sulu to fight Moro insurgents. Upon his return from Mindanao, was appointed chief clerk of the Comisaría de Guerra in Cavite where he worked for 20 years. He became a Freemason and joined the Katipunan in 1892. He was the founder of two Katipunan branches, namely, Balangay No. 1 named Marikít ("bright") in Barrio San Antonio, Cavite, and Balangay No. 2 called Lintík ("lightning") in Barrio San Rafael, Cavite. Among the people he initiated into the Katipunan were the jail warden Severino Lapidario, Feliciano Cabuco, tailor José Lallana, watchmaker Eugenio Cabezas and tailor Eulogio Raymundo. He was married to Celedonia Santiago, with whom he had four children.
Máximo Inocencio	November 18, 1833	Cavite	He was the oldest of the martyrs. Being a Freemason, he was implicated in the Cavite Mutiny of 1872 and was subsequently exiled to Ceuta in Spanish Morocco or Cartagena, Spain for ten years. Upon his return, he rebuilt his fortune from building and bridge contracting, shipbuilding, sawmilling, logging and trading. He was married to Narcisa Francisco with whom he had nine children.
José Lallana	1836	Cavite	He was a tailor whose shop was used by the Katipunan as a meeting place. Lallana was married to Benita Tapawan of Imus, by whom he had two children, Clara and Ramón. Ramón would later join the Revolution to avenge his father's death, but he never returned and is believed to have been killed in action.
Severino Lapidario	January 8, 1847	Imus, Cavite	He was a corporal in the Spanish Navy Marines who was implicated in the Cavite Mutiny of 1872. He later regained the confidence of the Spanish colonial authorities who named him warden of the Cavite provincial jail in 1890.
Victoriano Luciano III	March 23, 1863		He was a pharmacist and freemason who was recognised for his formulae of rare perfumes and lotions, and was a member Colégio de Farmaceuticos de Manila. He studied at the Colegio de San Juan de Letrán and University of Santo Tomas. He owned a pharmacy, Botica Luciano along Calle Real (now Trece Martires Avenue) in Cavite which was also a meeting place of the Katipunan.
Francisco Reyes Osorio	1860		He was the scion of a wealthy and well-connected family in Cavite. he was a pharmacist, businessman co-founder of Philippine First Insurance Co., Inc. (formerly Yek Tong Lin Fire & Marine Insurance Co.), a Freemason nor a Katipunero, Brother-in-law of Luis Aguado one of the Thirteen Martyrs of Cavite and brother of Cavite Late Governor Leonardo Reyes Osorio.
Hugo Pérez	1856	Binondo, Manila	He was a doctor of medicine. There is little biographical information about Pérez except that he was a Freemason.
Antonio San Agustín	March 8, 1860	San Roque, Cavite	He was a scion of a wealthy family. He studied at Colegio de San Juan de Letran and University of Santo Tomas. He was married to Juliana Reyes. He owned La Aurora, the only bookstore in town, which was used as a meeting place by the Katipunan's local members.

== The Cavite Conspiracy ==
Shortly before the Katipunan was uncovered, Emilio Aguinaldo was planning to attack the Spanish arsenal at Fort San Felipe and he enlisted other Katipuneros to recruit enough men so they could overrun the Spanish garrison. Their meetings were held at the house of Cabuco.

Aguinaldo and the other Katipuneros agreed that they would arm the inmates of the provincial jail who were made to work at the garrison. The task of recruiting the inmates was given to Lapidario, who was also the warden of the provincial jail. Aguado was to supply Lapidario with money to buy arms.

According to their plan, the uprising would be signaled by fireworks from the warehouse of Inocencio. Other leaders of the uprising were Luciano, Conchu, Pérez, Pablo José, Marcos José, and Juan Castañeda. The revolt was to start on September 1.

On August 26, Aguinaldo received a letter from Andrés Bonifacio who reported that a Katipunan assembly in Balintawak on August 24 decided to start the revolution on August 30, to be signaled by a blackout at the Luneta, then known as Bagumbayan. On the appointed day, Bonifacio and his men attacked the Spanish powder magazine in San Juan. Later that same day, the Spanish authorities declared martial law in Manila and the provinces of Cavite, Laguna, Batangas, Bulacan, Pampanga, Tarlac and Nueva Ecija.

Aguinaldo learned of the declaration of martial law in a meeting with Spanish Governor Fernando Pargas on the morning of August 31, 1896. He then went to Cabezas' haberdashery and asked him to inform Lapidario that they had no alternative but to rise in arms. Cabezas was the one who enlisted Lapidario for the planned uprising.

But Cabezas was not in favor of starting the revolt on August 31, 1896 so they discussed the uprising further. They decided to postpone the attack to September 3. However, the Spanish learned of the plan from a dressmaker named Victoriana Sayat and they immediately arrested Lapidario, de Ocampo and Aguado. The three were held incommunicado in the boat Ulloa and interrogated. They are presumed to have been tortured.

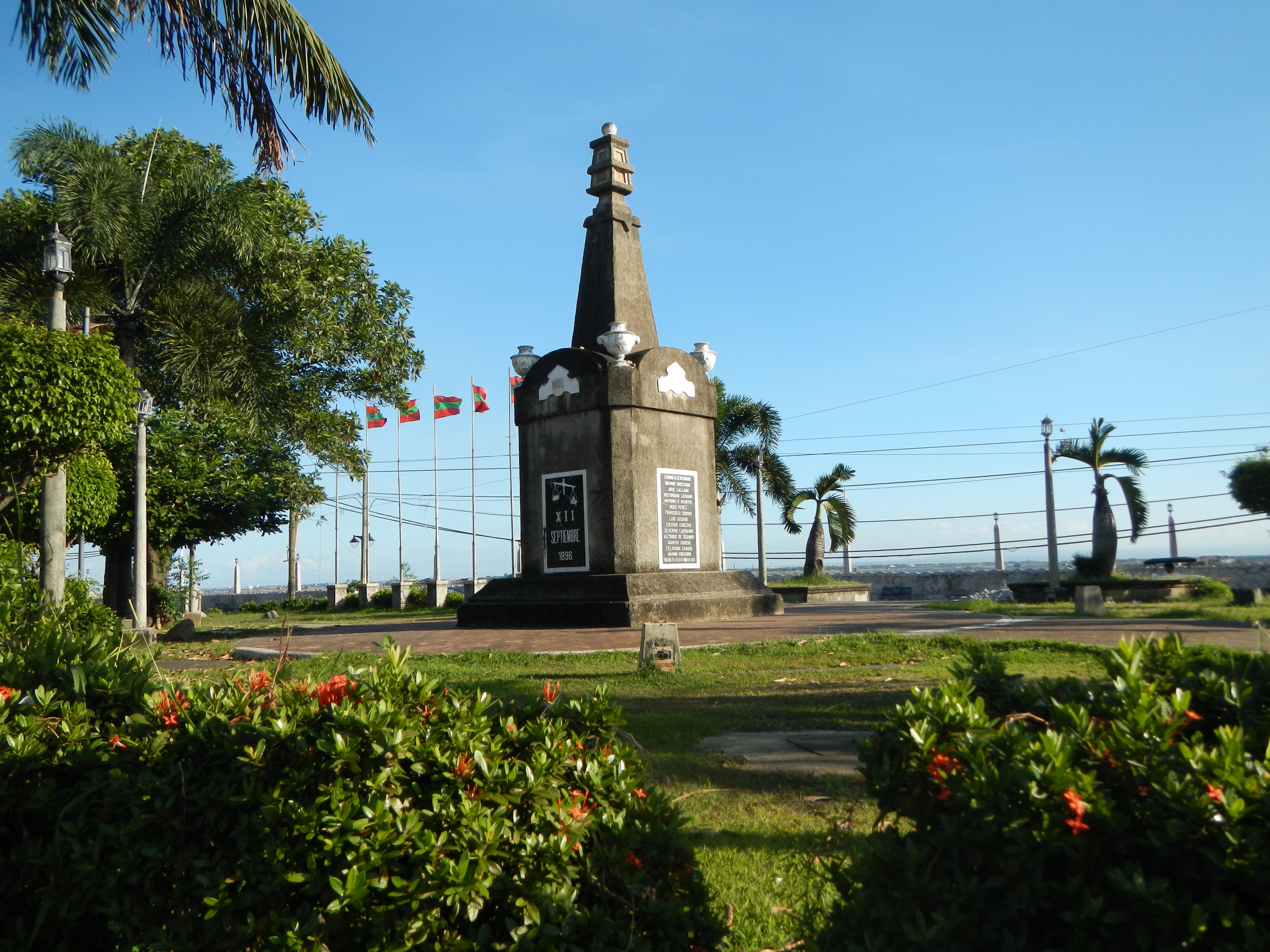
The Thirteen Martyrs Monument in Cavite City

De Ocampo revealed the names of his companions and the thirteen suspects were rounded up on September 3 along with dozens of other Cavite leaders, including the musician Julián Felipe, who would compose the Philippine national anthem the following year. Felipe was incarcerated for nine months at Fort San Felipe. Also subsequently released were Pablo and Marcos José, and Juan Castañeda of Imus, who are also believed to have been involved in the uprising.

While awaiting trial, guilt-stricken de Ocampo tried to commit suicide by slashing his stomach with a piece of broken glass. However, he was included in the indictment for treason before a military court which found them guilty on September 11 after a four-hour trial.

At 12:45 p.m. the following day, the thirteen patriots were brought out of their cells and taken to the Plaza de Armas, outside Fort San Felipe, and executed by musketry. Their bodies were later buried in a common grave at the Catholic cemetery at the village of Caridad.

Later, the bodies of seven of the martyrs—Máximo Inocencio, Victorino Luciano, Francisco Osorio, Luis Aguado, Hugo Pérez, José Lallana, and Antonio San Agustín—were exhumed and reburied elsewhere. But the rest—Agapito Conchu, Máximo Gregorio, Alfonso de Ocampo, Eugenio Cabezas, Feliciano Cabuco, and Severino Lapidario remained unclaimed in their common grave.

In 1906, a monument to the Thirteen Martyrs was erected at the San Roque district of Cavite City, at the head of the San Roque causeway. Their families reinterred the remains of their loved ones at the foot of the monument. The monument is located at the intersection of M. Valentin St., Lopez Jaena Rd, Zulueta Rd and the P. Burgos Ave.

== Legacy ==
In 1954, the capital of Cavite was transferred to a newly created city situated near the center of the province, and it was named Trece Mártires in their honor. Each of its 13 barangays were named for each of the martyrs. On May 24, 2004, a new monument of the thirteen patriots was inaugurated in Trece Martires near the City Hall.

== See also ==
- Philippine Revolution
- Fifteen Martyrs of Bicol executed on January 4, 1897
- Thirteen Martyrs of Bagumbayan executed on January 11, 1897
- Nineteen Martyrs of Aklan executed on March 23, 1897
