= Thirteen Martyrs of Bagumbayan =

Filipinos executed by Spain in 1897

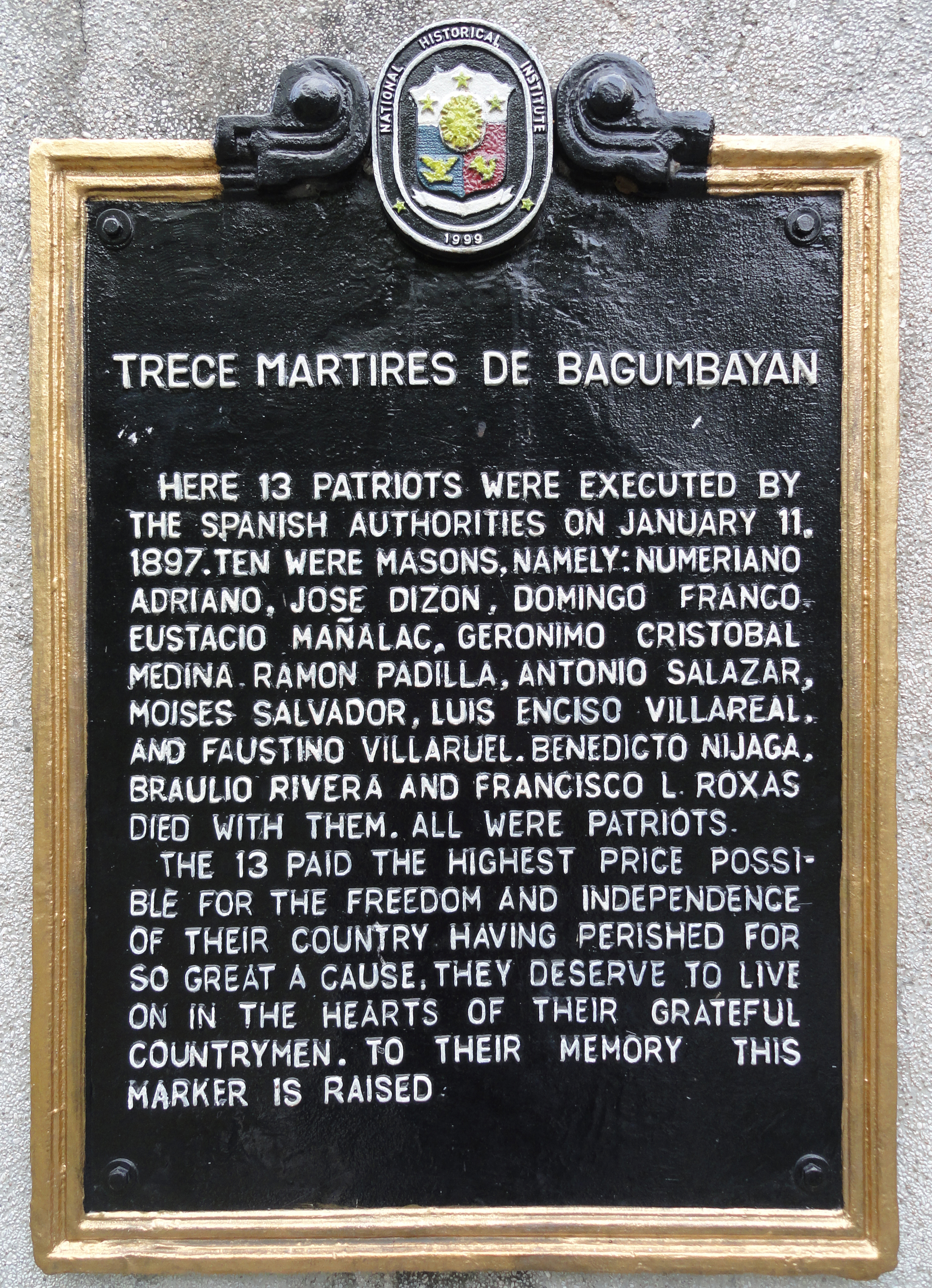
Historical marker installed by the National Historical Institute in Rizal Park to commemorate the martyrs.

The Thirteen Martyrs of Bagumbayan (Spanish: Trece mártires de Bagumbayan) were Filipino patriots in the Philippines who were executed by musketry on January 11, 1897, for cooperating with the Katipunan during the Philippine Revolution against Spain.

== The Martyrs ==
- Jose M. Dizon – was a Filipino patriot who was among those who founded the Katipunan that sparked the Philippine Revolution. Dizon was born in Binondo, Manila. In April 1892, he was inducted into the freemasonic lodge founded by Pedro Serrano Laktaw. That same year, he founded the lodge Taliba in Trozo (present part masangkay street corner mayhaligue street of Tondo District 2), Manila and served as its venerable master. He was also among the officers of the grand regional council that included Apolinario Mabini.
- Domingo Franco – Born in Mambusao, Capiz, Franco was the third among the six children of Juan Franco and Ciriaca Tuason. His father worked as procurador judicial, or solicitor, in the local justice of the peace court. He kept in his care the documents of the La Liga Filipina as ordered by Jose Rizal.
- Numeriano Adriano – A reformist, Adriano was one of those executed by the Spaniards soon after the revolution in 1896 broke out. He was the eldest of the seven children of Pioquinto Adriano and Agapita Resurreccion of Beata, Pandacan, Manila. Adriano enrolled in the University of Santo Tomas, but it is not known whether he finished a degree. For twenty years, he worked in the third branch of the Court of the First Instance as clerk of court.
- Moises Salvador – was a contractor, mason, and propagandist. Salvador was born in San Sebastian which was formerly a part of Quiapo, Manila. He was the son of Ambrosio Salvador, founding president of the La Liga Filipina, and Acosta Francisco.
- Faustino Villaruel – a merchant from Pandacan, Manila. A mason and one of the founding member of the La Liga Filipina, and supporter of the propaganda movement.
- Francisco L. Roxas – was a businessman, musician and a second cousin of one of the richest men in the Philippines at that time, Don Pedro Pablo Roxas. He was born in Binondo, Manila.
- Luis Enciso Villareal – was a member of the Propaganda Movement. Villareal was born in Daraga, Albay. His father, Francisco Villareal, was known to be a “wonderful fiddler” and a graceful dancer. Meanwhile, his mother was Maria Espinas. His parents own an abaca plantation. He was initially enrolled in the town school but was later sent to a seminary in Naga, Camarines Sur where he finished with a bachelor of arts degree.
- Geronimo M. Cristobal – He was an infantry corporal in the regiment known by the nickname “Burgos.” As he stood there facing the array of guns pointed menacingly at him and his companions, he must have thought it rather unreal that he should meet his fate at the hand of his former comrades-in-arms, some of whom could be his friends.
- Antonio Salazar – Salazar y San Agustin was one of the 13 Masons and revolutionaries who were executed by the Spanish authorities.
- Ramon Padilla – Padilla at the time of the outbreak of the Revolution in 1896 was said to be a clerk at the Comandancia de la Marina (Navy).
- Braulio Rivera – Born in Gitna (now renamed after him), Tondo, Manila near the corner of Zabala and Sto. Cristo Streets. Rivera was the son of Jose Rivera, a worker at the tobacco monopoly administration. Little is known of his early background: although only an elementary graduate, he was employed as a clerk at the “Sub-inspeccion General de Montes”. He had an exceptional singing voice thus, was inclined to singing. He was also an able musician who played three instruments – the guitar, violin and flute.
- Faustino Mañalac – He was a clerk in the Port of Manila administration and headed the Ilog Pasig council of the KKK in Binondo. A son of a carpenter at the naval shipyard in San Roque, Cavite, he became a member of the KKK Supreme Council using the alias "Mayon". Married to Marta Saldaña, who was a member of the KKK women's section along with Gregoria de Jesus, Maria Dizon, Josefa and Trinidad Rizal, Mañalac is listed among those who visited the Pamitinan caves with Andres Bonifacio, Emilio Jacinto, Aurelio Tolentino, Guillermo Masangkay on Good Friday, 1895 and wrote about Philippine independence on the walls of the cave.
- Benedicto "Biktoy" P. Nijaga – During a raid of a printing press in Binondo, the Spaniards found and confiscated subversive documents including a list of members of the Katipunan. Benedicto Nijaga was on the list as a collector of revolutionary funds. Upon the order of Gov. Polavieja to arbitrarily arrest all suspected members of the Katipunan, Nijaga was arrested while he was campaigning for revolutionary funds. He is one of the notable people of Calbayog.

== See also ==
- Rizal Park or Luneta Park of Bagumbayan
- Thirteen Martyrs of Cavite
- Fifteen Martyrs of Bicol
- Nineteen Martyrs of Aklan
