= Camilo =

Camilo is both a given name and a surname. Notable people with the name include:

== Given name ==
- Camilo (footballer, born 9 March 1986), Fernando Camilo Farias, Brazilian football midfielder
- Camilo (footballer, born 22 March 1986), Camilo de Sousa Vieira, Brazilian football goalkeeper
- Camilo (footballer, born 1999), Camilo Reijers de Oliveira, Brazilian football midfielder
- Camilo Albornoz (born 2000), Argentine footballer
- Camilo Alonso Vega (1899–1971), Spanish military officer during Francoist era
- Camilo Arenivar (born 1967), American ordained minister for LGBT couples
- Camilo Ayala (born 1986), Colombian footballer
- Camilo Ballesteros (born 1987), Chilean communist politician
- Camilo Becerra (born 1980), Colombian freestyle swimer
- Camilo Benítez (born 1999), Ecuadorian footballer
- Camilo Bonilla (born 1971), Honduran footballer
- Camilo Capiberibe (born 1972), Brazilian politician
- Camilo Carrillo (1844–1898), Peruvian naval captain
- Camilo Cascolan (born 1964), Filipino law enforcement officer
- Camilo Castelo Branco (1825–1890), Portuguese writer
- Camilo Castiblanco (born 1988), Colombian cyclist
- Camilo Catrillanca (1994–2018), Chilean farmer killed by police
- Camilo Ceballos (born 1984), Colombian footballer
- Camilo Cerviño (1928–2017), Argentine footballer
- Camilo Cienfuegos (1932–1959), Cuban revolutionary
- Camilo Coba (born 1986), Ecuadorian filmmaker
- Camilo Daza (1898–1975), Colombian aviator
- Camilo de Sousa (born 1953), Mozambican filmmaker
- Camilo Delgado (1927–2005), Puerto Rican television show host and producer
- Camilo Diaz Gregorio (1939–2018), Filipino Roman Catholic bishop
- Camilo Domingos (1965–2005), Santomean singer
- Camilo Doval (born 1997), Dominican baseball relief pitcher for the San Francisco Giants
- Camilo Echevarría (born 1990), Argentine racing driver
- Camilo Echeverry (born 1994), Colombian singer who records under the mononym "Camilo"
- Camilo Egas (1889–1962), Ecuadorian painter
- Camilo Eifler (born 1998), American football linebacker
- Camilo Escalona (born 1955), Chilean politician
- Camilo Estévez (bishop) (died 1999), Spanish bishop of the Palmarian Catholic Church
- Camilo Estévez (handball) (born 1970), Puerto Rican handball coach
- Camilo Gaínza (born 1993), Chilean footballer
- Camilo García de Polavieja (1838–1914), Spanish colonial general
- Camilo Gómez (born 1984), Colombian cyclist
- Camilo González (born 1947), Colombian chemical engineer
- Camilo Henríquez (1769–1825), Chilean priest, author and politician
- Camilo Jacob (1856–1897), Filipino revolutionary
- Camilo Jiménez (born 1996), Peruvian footballer
- Camilo José Cela Conde (born 1946), Spanish writer
- Camilo José Cela y Trulock (1916–2002), Spanish Nobel prize winner
- Camilo José Vergara (born 1944), Chilean-born American writer
- Camilo Lammawin, Filipino politician
- Camilo López (born 1969), Paraguayan sports organizer
- Camilo Lorenzo Iglesias (1940–2020), Spanish Roman Catholic bishop
- Camilo Luzuriaga (born 1953), Ecuadorian film producer
- Camilo Machado (born 1999), Colombian footballer
- Camilo Marin (1913–1988), Cuban jockey agent
- Camilo Marks (born 1948), Chilean human rights lawyer
- Camilo Mayada (born 1991), Uruguayan footballer
- Camilo Mayr (born 1991), German archer
- Camilo Mejía (born 1975), Nicaraguan-born former U.S. Army soldier
- Camilo Melivilú (born 1993), Chilean footballer
- Camilo Mena (born 2002), Colombian footballer
- Camilo Menéndez Tolosa (1899–1971), Spanish general
- Camilo Miettinen (born 1986), Colombian-born Finnish ice hockey player
- Camilo Minero (1917–2005), Salvadoran painter
- Camilo Monroy (born 1998), Colombian footballer
- Camilo Morán (born 1990), Chilean politician
- Camilo Mori (1896–1973), Chilean painter
- Camilo Moya (born 1998), Chilean footballer
- Camilo Nogueira Román (born 1936), Spanish politician and engineer
- Camilo Nvo (born 1986), Equatoguinean footballer
- Camilo Ortega (1950–1978), Nicaraguan revolutionary
- Camilo Osías (1889–1976), Filipino politician
- Camilo Ospina Bernal (born 1959), Colombian lawyer and politician
- Camilo Pascual (born 1934), Cuban baseball player
- Camilo Pedro (born 1932), Hong Kong sports shooter
- Camilo Peña (born 1992), Chilean footballer
- Camilo Pérez (boxer) (born 1990), Puerto Rican boxer
- Camilo Pérez (footballer) (born 1985), Colombian footballer
- Camilo Pessanha (1867–1926), Portuguese symbolist poet
- Camilo Pino (born 1970), Venezuelan novelist
- Camilo Ponce (born 1991), Chilean footballer
- Camilo Ponce Enríquez (1912–1976), former president of Ecuador
- Camilo Pontoni (born 1995), Chilean footballer
- Camilo Prieto Valderrama, Colombian surgeon, researcher, and professor
- Camilo Quiason (1925–2014), Filipino lawyer
- Camilo R. Gomez (born 1960), American neurologist
- Camilo Ramírez Puente (born 1959), Mexican politician
- Camilo Rencoret (born 1991), Chilean footballer
- Camilo Reyes Rodríguez, Colombian diplomat
- Camilo Rivas (1898–????), Argentine track and field athlete
- Camilo Rodríguez (born 1995), Chilean footballer
- Camilo Romero (footballer) (born 1970), Mexican footballer
- Camilo Romero (politician) (born 1976), Colombian journalist, politician and diplomat
- Camilo Ruspoli, 4th Duke of Alcudia and Sueca (1904–1975), Spanish aristocrat
- Camilo Sabio (born 1936), Filipino lawyer
- Camilo Saldaña (born 1999), Chilean footballer
- Camilo Salvo (born 1935), Chilean lawyer and politician
- Camilo Santana (born 1968), Brazilian engineer and politician
- Camilo Sanvezzo (born 1988), usually referred to simply as Camilo, Brazilian footballer
- Camilo Sesto (1946–2019), Spanish singer, songwriter
- Camilo Soares Machado, Paraguayan government minister
- Camilo Tiqui, Canadian politician
- Camilo Torres Restrepo (1929–1966), Colombian Roman Catholic priest
- Camilo Torres Tenorio (1766–1816), Colombian politician
- Camilo Ugo Carabelli (born 1999), Argentine tennis player
- Camilo Valenzuela, Chilean army general
- Camilo Vargas (born 1989), Colombian footballer
- Camilo Varona, Cuban baseball player
- Camilo Velozo (born 1996), Chilean karateka
- Camilo Venegas (born 1967), Cuban journalist
- Camilo Villegas (born 1982), Colombian golfer
- Camilo Viveiros, American political activist
- Camilo Vives (1940s–2013), Cuban film producer
- Camilo Ynitia (1803–1850s), Native American tribal chief

== Surname ==
- Dimas Camilo (born 1989), Mexican canoeist
- Francisco Camilo (1610–1671), Spanish painter
- Janet Camilo (born 1971), Dominican lawyer and politician
- Michel Camilo (born 1954), Dominican jazz-Latin pianist and composer
- Tiago Camilo (born 1982), Brazilian judoka
- Wallace Camilo (born 1992), Brazilian footballer

== Fictional Characters ==
- Camilo Madrigal, a supporting character in the 2021 Disney film Encanto

== See also ==
- Camila (disambiguation)
- Camillo (disambiguation)
