= Polangui =

Municipality in Albay, Philippines

- Municipality
- Municipality of Polangui
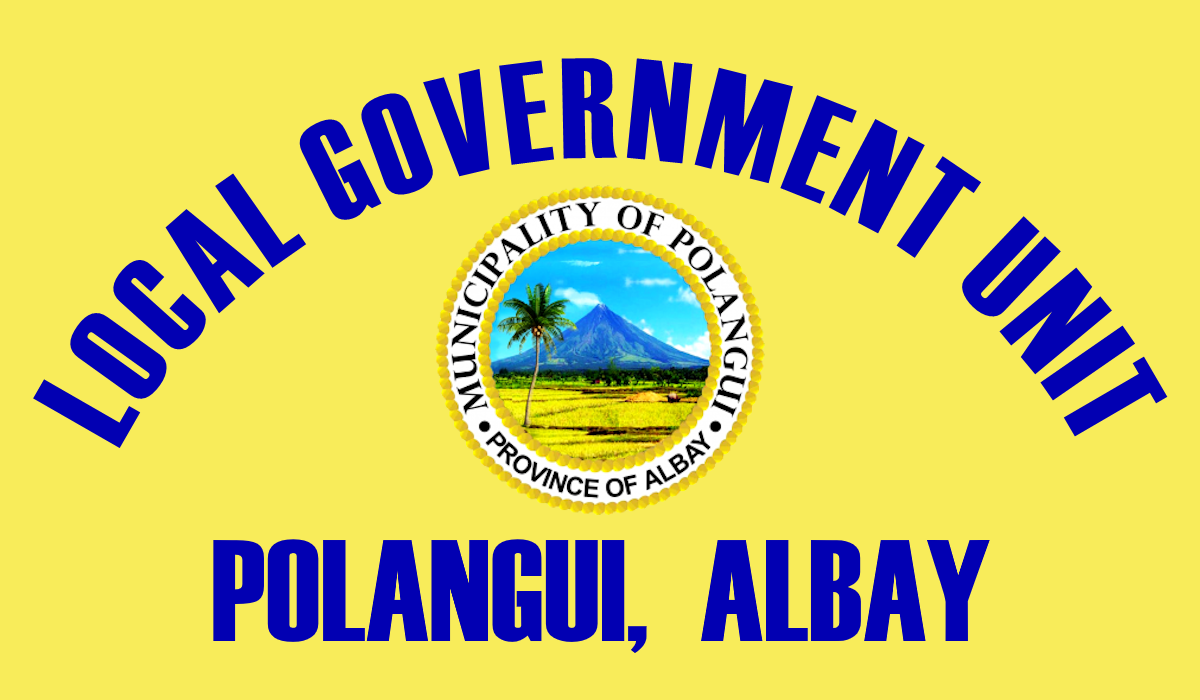
- Flag

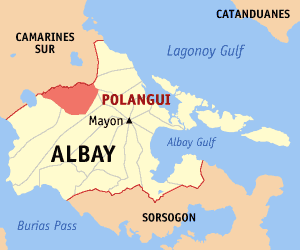
- Map of Albay with Polangui highlighted
- Interactive map of Polangui
- Location within the Philippines
- Coordinates: 13°17′32″N 123°29′08″E
- Country: Philippines
- Region: Bicol Region
- Province: Albay
- District: 3rd district
- Founded: 1584
- Founder: Fray Baltazar de la Magdalena, OFM
- Barangays: 44 (see Barangays)

Government
  - Type: Sangguniang Bayan
  - Mayor: Jesciel Richard G. Salceda
  - Vice Mayor: Cherilie M. Sampal
  - Representative: Raymond Adrian E. Salceda
  - Municipal Council: Members: Kristel Louise S. Pasia; Eugene L. Arrive; Mark Thet N. Sabando; Bernie S. Broncano; Niño Adonis B. Rebeta; William H. Buendia, Sr.; Rizaldy B. Recierdo; Kenny Edren R. Siguenza
  - Electorate: 63,009 voters (2025)

Area
  - Total: 145.30 km^{2} (56.10 sq mi)
- Elevation: 59 m (194 ft)
- Highest elevation: 320 m (1,050 ft)
- Lowest elevation: 12 m (39 ft)

Population (2024 census)
  - Total: 89,176
  - Rank: 115 out of 1,488
  - Density: 613.74/km^{2} (1,589.6/sq mi)
  - Households: 20,382
- Demonym(s): Polangueño (male); Polangueña (female)

Economy
  - Income class: 1st municipal income class
  - Poverty incidence: 24.81% (2023)
  - Revenue: ▲PHP 378.299 million (2022)
  - Expenditure: ▲PHP 276.786 million (2022)
  - Assets: ▲PHP 1,082.316 million (2022)
  - Liabilities: ▲PHP 323.799 million (2022)

Service provider
  - Electricity: Albay Electric Cooperative (ALECO)
  - Water: Polangui Waterworks Services Administration (POWASA)
- Time zone: UTC+8 (PST)
- ZIP code: 4506
- PSGC: 0500514000
- IDD : area code: +63 (0)52
- Native languages: Rinconada Bikol; Central Bikol; Tagalog
- Major religions: Roman Catholicism
- Feast date: June 29
- Catholic diocese: Diocese of Legazpi
- Patron saint: Saints Peter and Paul
- Website: www.polangui.gov.ph

Polangui, officially the Municipality of Polangui (Central Bikol: Banwaan kan Polangui; West Miraya Bikol: Banwaan nin Polangui; Rinconada Bikol: Banwaan ka Polangui; Tagalog: Bayan ng Polangui), is a municipality in the province of Albay, Philippines. According to the 2024 census, it has a population of 89,344 people.

== Etymology ==
The origin of the name Polangui has many versions. The foremost and seemingly more accepted version is, "that of a giant robust tree which existed majestically in the early municipal settlement". The natives of the settlement called the "Oyangue", which also served as the early landmark of the area whereby new settlers looked upon in their wandering. Similarly, the early Spanish frontier settlers found this tree and it became their famous settlement landmark. The settlement was then called "Binanuaan" but often referred to as "Oyangue" by nearby settlers. As more settlers came to dwell and engage in trade endeavors with the indigenous inhabitants, the more was the settlement known in distant areas by the name "Oyangue" (referring to the tree landmark) which was more widely accepted than "Binanuaan". The passing of generations corrupted the word "Oyangue" into several acronyms. Most acceptable and widely used before was "Polangue" and later "Polangui" which has remained today.

Another legend is about the story of a maiden named "Pulang Angui" which means "Red Maria" (Angui is the nickname for Maria) who loved red colors for dress and whose beautiful body, face and red lips became the object of affection by the males to the point of adoration. She was modest in her ways, talented for possessing various skills, with happy disposition, showing love of arts and religion. She would lead the tribe in festivities. When the Spaniards came, the soldiers who first set foot in Polangui asked for the name of the place. The native thought the foreigners was asking for the name of "Pulang Angui" and said so. The Spaniards recorded the name of the place as Pulangui, a concoction of the name which was later on, as years went by, was converted to Polangui.

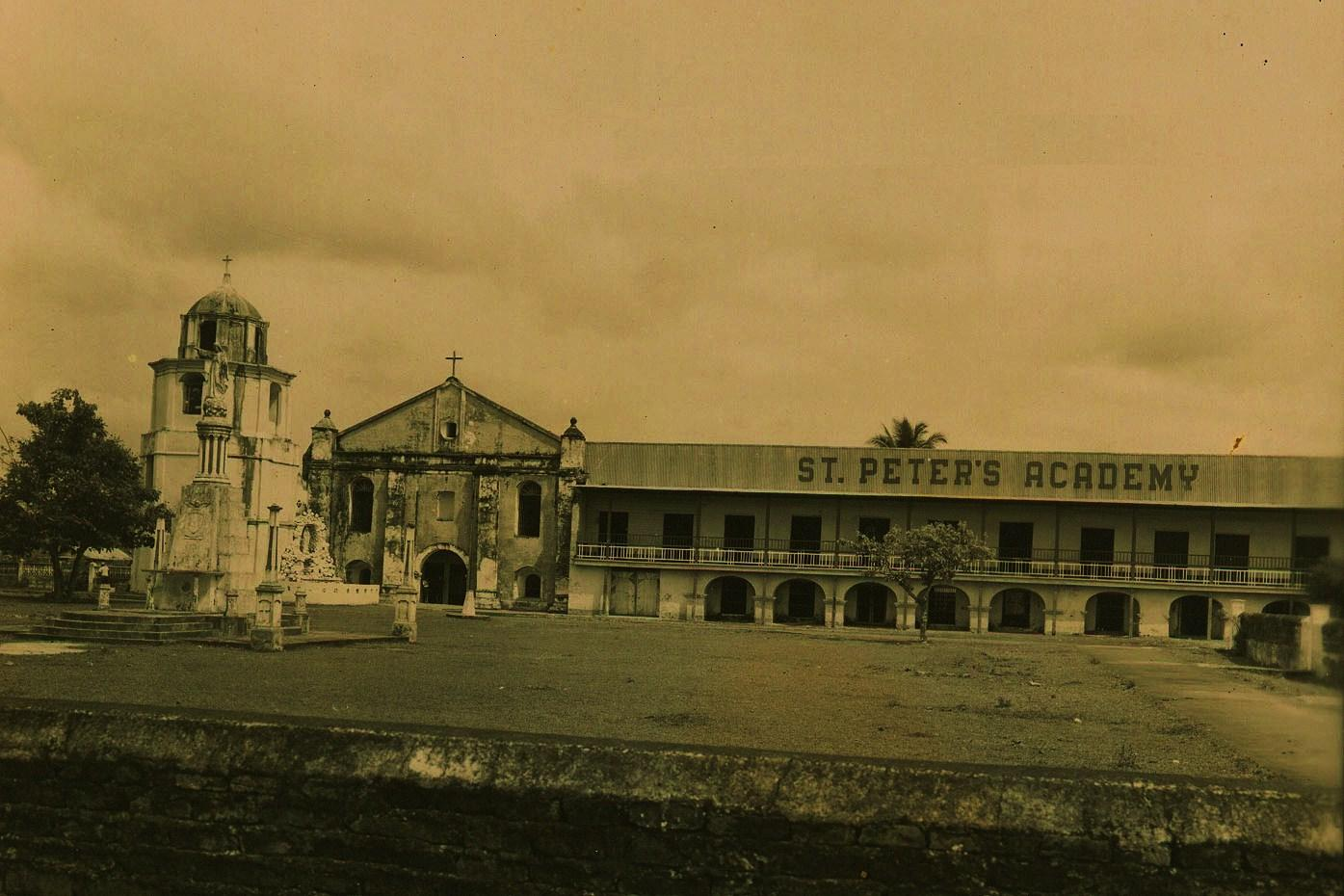
Sts. Peter and Paul Parish Church (circa 1966)

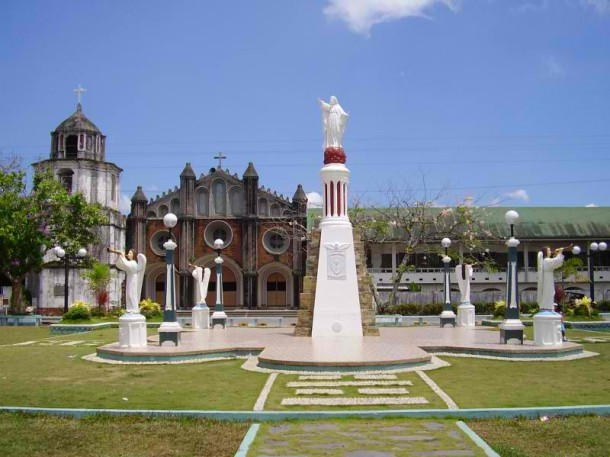
Sts. Peter and Paul Parish Church (circa 2010)

== History ==
=== Precolonial period ===
Pre-colonial Polangui was a fertile valley cradled by the virgin forests of Mount Masaraga. It was formed out of five settlements ruled by the Datu of Ponso till the late 1583. The center of the settlements was called Banwang gurang, meaning "old town" and is now known as Magurang.

In 1584, Fray Baltazar de la Magdalena, left Ambos Camarines and stumbled upon this place west of Mount Masaraga. He found that each of the five settlements had about 100 inhabitants. In the same year, he founded a settlement within the fertile valley and established a ranch, which he called "Binanuaan". Being inland and strategically situated, the town was spared from the frequent raids of sea pirates as well as from the occasional destruction caused by the eruption of Mayon Volcano.

Polangui became a visita, or outreach village under the jurisdiction of the Villa Santiago de Libon, which was established in 1573 by Juan de Salcedo, the grandson of the Spanish conquistador Miguel Lopez de Legazpi. The villa, which lies south-west of Polangui, would be known as the fourth of its kind in the entire archipelago.

Fray de la Magdalena was credited with the founding of Polangui. Old manuscripts in the Archives of Manila and in the Franciscan Convent in Manila point to 1584 as the year Polangui was founded, and thus considered as one of the oldest municipalities in the Philippines.

=== Spanish regime ===
By 1654, the original settlement became considerably bigger when Fray Alonzo de San Juan, was assigned in Polangui as "Encargado". The settlement was expanded reaching the present barangay sites in Lanigay, Ponso and Balinad. The town proper was established in Lanigay where a church made of wood was erected adjacent to about 280 wooden dwellings and more than 1,000 nipa huts. Unfortunately, this church together with the dwelling units was razed by a fire to the ground.

With the coming of another missionary, Fray Juan Bautista Marza, a new church made of bricks and stones was completed in 1664. This church stood on a new elevated site and still stands to this day. Under the leadership of Fray Marza, roads and bridges were also initiated and schools were introduced simultaneously with the Christian Doctrine and Spanish culture.

Growth of the settlement was so fast that it became a Poblacion and finally recognized as a Pueblo in 1674. Owing to its steady growth, a link with nearby Libon and Oas became a necessity. Hence, Fr. Jose Arnao, parish priest and Encargado from 1832 until 1852, directed the construction of roads and bridges that would connect Polangui to neighboring towns, including upland Buhi in Camarines Sur.

During Spanish regime, a significant highlight is the construction of its parish church which took 10 years to be completed starting in 1654 by Fray Alonzo de San Juan and completed in 1664 by Fray Juan Bautista Marza.

Polangueño martyr, Camilo Jacob, who is a photographer, was executed on January 4, 1897, with other Bicolanos. They are now commemorated as the Quince Martires del Bicolandia. A year later, the Spanish rule in Bicol ended with the mutiny of Guardia Civil in Naga led by Elias Angeles.

=== American period ===
Sometime during the Philippine–American War, Polangui became the seat of the Provincial Government of Albay for a brief period under Governor Domingo Samson. When the Americans conquered Polangui in 1890 without firing a single shot, the form of government went through transition from military to civil government then Commonwealth system. The seat of the municipal government was in Ponso with Clemente Sarte as the acting Chief Executive. A few months later, the seat of the municipal government was transferred to Centro Occidental and still remains up to this day.

=== Japanese occupation ===
When the Japanese forces occupied Polangui on December 13, 1941, Cipriano Saunar, then vice mayor of the Commonwealth government was appointed mayor by the Japanese military administration. A secret civil government was established simultaneously headed by Julian Saunar which was supported by the people. Cipriano Saunar's successor was Manuel Samson Sr. and in turn was succeeded by Jesus Salalima who ruled from 1947 to 1960.

== Geography ==
Polangui is located at 13°17′32″N 123°29′08″E, in the north-eastern quadrant of the third district of Albay.

According to the Philippine Statistics Authority, the municipality has a land area of 145.30 square kilometres (56.10 sq mi) constituting 5.64% of the 2,575.77-square-kilometre- (994.51 sq mi) total area of Albay.

Polangui is bounded on the north by Buhi and Iriga City of Camarines Sur province, south by Libon, Oas and City of Ligao; and west by Malinao and the City of Tabaco. It is 37 kilometres (23 mi) from Legazpi and 490 kilometres (300 mi) from Manila.

=== Climate ===
Climate data for Polangui, Albay
Month	Jan	Feb	Mar	Apr	May	Jun	Jul	Aug	Sep	Oct	Nov	Dec	Year
Mean daily maximum °C (°F)	27 (81)	28 (82)	29 (84)	31 (88)	31 (88)	30 (86)	29 (84)	29 (84)	29 (84)	29 (84)	29 (84)	28 (82)	29 (84)
Mean daily minimum °C (°F)	22 (72)	22 (72)	22 (72)	23 (73)	25 (77)	25 (77)	25 (77)	25 (77)	25 (77)	24 (75)	23 (73)	23 (73)	24 (75)
Average precipitation mm (inches)	55 (2.2)	36 (1.4)	45 (1.8)	42 (1.7)	114 (4.5)	184 (7.2)	245 (9.6)	224 (8.8)	238 (9.4)	171 (6.7)	130 (5.1)	94 (3.7)	1,578 (62.1)
Average rainy days	13.0	9.5	11.8	12.7	21.3	25.3	28.3	26.5	26.4	24.2	19.9	16.1	235
Source: Meteoblue

Polangui has a general climate characterized by dry season with a very pronounced maximum rainfall from November to December. Prevailing wind is in the general direction from north-east to south-west.

=== Protected areas ===
==== Buhi Wildlife Sanctuary ====
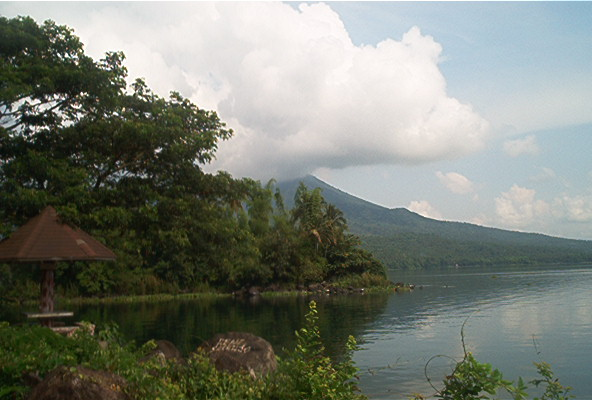
Lake Buhi and its surrounding watershed form the core of the Buhi Wildlife Sanctuary.

Lake Danao in Barangay Danao, one of the lake ecosystems within the Buhi Wildlife Sanctuary.

The tabios or sinarapan (Mistichthys luzonensis), a freshwater goby endemic to the Bicol Region and one of the sanctuary's key conservation species.

The Buhi Wildlife Sanctuary is a protected area located in the provinces of Camarines Sur and Albay. It encompasses Lake Buhi and several adjacent lakes and lakelets, including Lakes Manapao, Katugday, Makuwaw, and Danao, together with their associated watersheds and wetland ecosystems.

The sanctuary extends into portions of northeastern Albay, including Barangays Danao and Maysua in the Municipality of Polangui. It was recognized as a protected area under Republic Act No. 11038, otherwise known as the Expanded National Integrated Protected Areas System Act of 2018, which was approved on June 22, 2018.. The sanctuary now forms part of the National Integrated Protected Areas System (NIPAS) and is managed by the Department of Environment and Natural Resources (DENR).

One of the principal objectives of the sanctuary is the protection of the tabios or sinarapan (Mistichthys luzonensis), a species of freshwater goby endemic to the Bicol Region and regarded as the world's smallest commercially harvested fish. The species occurs in Lake Buhi and several nearby lakes and lakelets, including Lake Danao in Polangui. The conservation of these aquatic habitats is considered essential to the survival of the species, whose populations have been affected by overfishing, habitat degradation, and the introduction of non-native fish species.

The sanctuary's forested areas also contribute to watershed protection, biodiversity conservation, and ecological connectivity between the uplands of Albay and Camarines Sur. These habitats provide refuge for numerous native species and play an important role in regulating water flow and reducing soil erosion within the Lake Buhi watershed.

==== Mt. Masaraga Protected Landscape ====
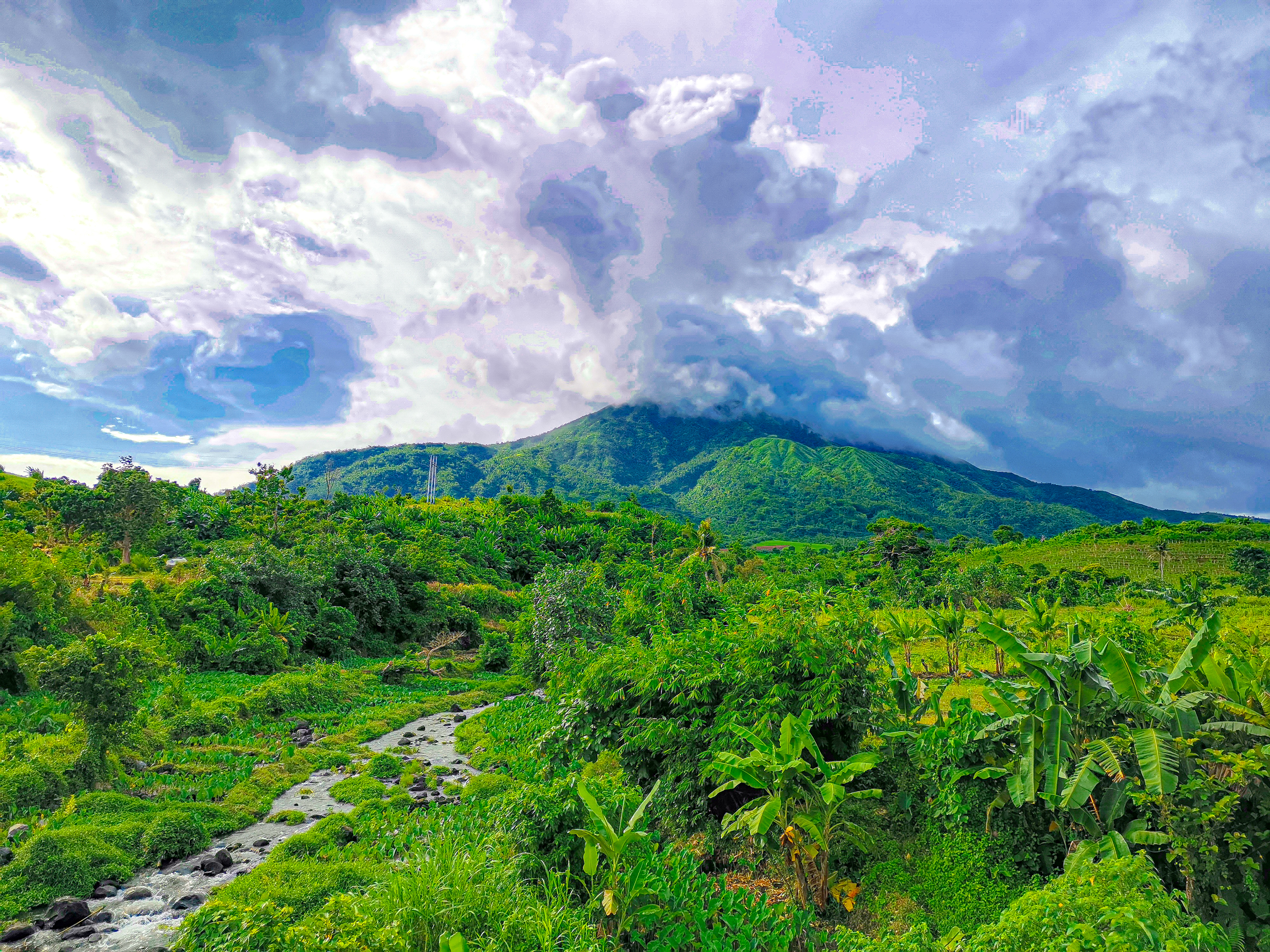
Mount Masaraga, the centerpiece of the protected landscape.

The Mt. Masaraga Protected Landscape is a protected area in the province of Albay centered on Mount Masaraga, an extinct stratovolcano. The protected landscape encompasses portions of the municipalities of Polangui and Oas and the cities of Ligao and Tabaco.

The area was established through Republic Act No. 12227, otherwise known as the Mt. Masaraga Protected Landscape Act, which was approved on July 9, 2025. The law declared approximately 840 hectares of public land as a protected landscape under the National Integrated Protected Areas System (NIPAS).

Within Polangui, the protected landscape covers portions of the upland barangays of Balaba, Balinad, and Maysua.

The protected landscape contains residual and secondary forests that serve as important watersheds for surrounding communities. Republic Act No. 12227 cites the area's biological richness, ecological importance, and role in the conservation of native flora and fauna as among the reasons for its protection.

=== Barangays ===
Polangui is politically subdivided into 44 barangays. Each barangay consists of puroks and some have sitios.

It is grouped into three divisions:

- Poblacion Barangays – 13 member barangays
- Rinconada Area Development Council (RADC) – 11 member barangays
- Upland Area Development Council (UADC) – 20 member barangays

Barangay	Land area (ha.)	Class	District	Etymology	Brief history
Agos	298.84	Rural	RADC	The old name of this sitio during the early Spanish rule was "Bato Lis Non". On the eastern side of the sitio was Sitio Matakot, or known to be later as Matacon. Because of the difficulty in remembering its former name, visitors and strangers to the sitio would easily remember the wide river that separates the province of Albay and Camarines Sur, the Agos River. Thus, as time passed by, the barangay was named Agos.	A certain Angel Servas was the first Teniente del Barrio to lead a group of 24 households in the early years of Spanish rule. Others to follow were: Antonio Mendoza, Paulino Segui, Vicente Epres, Eustaquio Seda, Pedro General (first to assume the position of Barangay Captain), Felicisimo Cagnayo Sr., and Rogelio Laynes.
Alnay	214.87	Urban	Poblacion	Unknown	A sitio of Barangay Ponso in the early days, it was a verdant place full of ricefields. In the latter part of the 1960s, Dr. Esteban Ante (deceased), a landowner, developed his ricefields into a subdivision, thus attracting people to reside in the place. With that development, Councilor Santiago M. Revale passed a resolution creating Alnay as an independent barangay. It was approved and concurred in by the Sangguniang Panlalawigan of Albay, headed then by Governor Felix Imperial.
Alomon	154.19	Urban	Poblacion	As old folks say, the place was inhabited by people who are very industrious, that even in the evening they work at their farms. There was then a visitor in the barrio, a foreigner, who greeted the workers in the ricefields, and jokingly greeted the bright moon in this way: "Hello Moon!". Thinking that the stranger was naming the place, the residents remembered it as "Hello Moon". As the time passed by, the place was named as Alomon.	During the early years, Alomon was a sitio of Barrio Kinale. Its first Teniente del Barrio was Domingo Satorre, who was responsible for its establishment as an independent barrio in 1972.
Amoguis	147.13	Rural	UADC	Unknown	As old folks used to tell, there were only three barangays that comprised Polangui then in the year 1654 when Father Alonzo de San Juan founded the pueblo of Binanuaan. Amoguis and several other settlements were part of Barangay Layugay (now known as Lanigay). With the passing of time, these sitios became independent barangays through RA 2370 or the Barrio Charter enacted during the term of President Carlos P. Garcia on June 20, 1959.
Anopol	200.32	Rural	UADC	The barangay got its name from a vine called "anopol", with the leaves that climb on tall trees and are commonly found along river banks, creeks and natural springs.	Anopol was a former sitio of Barrio Lanigay. It became an independent barrio pursuant to RA 3590 or the Revised Barrio Charter enacted during the term of President Carlos P. Garcia on June 22, 1963. Its first administrator was Bienvenido Cellona.
Apad	455.76	Rural	RADC	A sitio of Barrio Lanygay during the early years of Spanish rule, it was the center of convergence of several upland sitios namely: Kinuartelan, La Medalla, Upper Santicon, San Roque and several other sitios. During that time, the only means of transportation was the "RailBoss" of the Ferrocarril de Manila-Dagupan (predececcor of the Philippine National Railways). The "railbos" had its terminal located in Apad, thus becoming known as "Parada". As years passed by, the word was corrupted until it became Apad.	A sitio of Barrio Lanigay during the early years of Spanish rule, it was the center of convergence of several upland sitios namely: Kinuartelan, La Medalla, Upper Santicon, San Roque and several other sitios.
Balaba	510.40	Rural	UADC	Old folks traces the name Balaba from the word "balabag na dalan", or the crookedness of its road due to the steepness of its slope leading to the settlement.	Formerly a sitio of Barangay Balinad, it became an independent barrio in 1967. Councilwoman Benigna Calpe was the sponsor of the resolution creating Balaba. First appointed Teniente del Barrio was Carlos Sangat, serving from 1948 to 1951.
Balangibang	269.95	Urban	Poblacion	'The early residents put the name of these two capital towns Balanga and Iba together to retrieve the name of early Chieftain of their tribe, Balang aNd the princess of Zambales named Ibang. Thus the name Balangibang came to be.	As with other present barangays of Polangui, Balangibang was a sitio of Lanigay (the mother barangay in the early years of Spanish rule). It was a vast agricultural land owned by the Alsua/Buenviaje and Catalina vda. de Gloria families. With the implementation of the Comprehensive Agrarian Reform Law (CARL) during the term of President Diosdado Macapagal, these ricelands were distributed to the tenants tilling the lands. With the enactment of the Revised Barrio Charter in 1963, Balangibang became an independent barrio.
Balinad	727.65	Rural	UADC	The name Balinad originated from the name of a certain tree called "sorsogon" (locally known as "balinad"), which grew abundantly in the said place.	Barangay Balinad is one of the original mother barangays that was established when Polangui was founded.
Basud	116.34	Urban	Poblacion	As old folks narrated the story, Basud got its name when the earlier farmer settlers backfilled the lower portion of the fields with "basud" (sand). This was the area between the boundary of Polangui and Oas. Large tract of lands were filled with sand in the desire of the farmers to make the area productive. Due to that development, the place was known as Basud.	It used to be a part of Sitio Ubaliw that belongs to the mother barangay of Lanigay in the early settlement years of Spanish rule. When the center of Pueblo was transferred from Lanigay to the present poblacion, these two (Basud and Ubaliw) became independent barangays.
Buyo	220.11	Rural	UADC	The place derived its name from "buyo", a native name of a vine which is an ingredient for making "ikmo" or "nganga", which thrives abundantly in the place.	It was a sitio of mother barangay Lanigay in the early years. It was established as an independent barangay in the year 1946, under the administration of Mayor Manuel Samson, Sr.
Centro Occidental (seat of church and government)	191.82	Urban	Poblacion	Due to increased development in the area, this former sitio of Lanigay became a barangay of its own and was called Centro Occidental, as it is in the western portion of the Poblacion (centro). It is also popularly called "Ilaod". This is because when people go to the market, they would call it "Iraya" (meaning upstream) and when they go home, they would say Ilaod (meaning downstream).	Barangay Centro Occidental used to be a sitio of Barangay Lanigay. When the latter's settlement was hit by a conflagration in 1654 including the church, the encargado decided to transfer the church to the present site where it stands (now in present-day Centro Occidental). The church, municipal building and the market site were all eventually situated here, so the place was considered the centro of the Pueblo (divided into Centro Oriental or the eastern portion and Centro Occidental or the western portion). It was the center of commerce, seat of government and the center of religious activities. When the Revised Barrio Charter was enacted in 1963, Centro Oriental and Centro Occidental both became independent barangays. Years later, the Philippine National Railways (PNR) station was constructed at Barangay Basud. It was decided that the public market be transferred near the station. But because the seat of government and the parish church were still in place, Centro Occidental remains the de facto centro of the Municipality of Polangui. As population grew fast, development in the area grew fast too. More residential houses were constructed on the vast track of talahib. Elementary and secondary schools were also established.
Centro Oriental	29.12	Urban	Poblacion	Due to increased development in the area, this former sitio of Lanigay became a barangay of its own and was called Centro Oriental, as it is in the eastern portion of the Poblacion (centro).	When the settlement of Lanigay was hit by a conflagration in 1654 including the church, the encargado decided to transfer the church to the present site where it stands (now in present-day Centro Occidental). The church, municipal building and the market site were all eventually situated here, so the place was considered the centro of the Pueblo (divided into Centro Oriental or the eastern portion and Centro Occidental or the western portion). It was the center of commerce, seat of government and the center of religious activities. When the Revised Barrio Charter was enacted in 1963, Centro Oriental and Centro Occidental both became independent barangays.
Cepres	263.35	Rural	UADC	Old folks narrate that "two American strangers came and rested for a while, and saw people planting cypress shrubs and remarked that this place is safe to rest". The natives thought that the Americans were referring to the shrubs. From that time on, the place as known as Cepres.	Cepres was originally a sitio of mother barangay Lanigay. It was known as Cepres during the early years of 1930 during the term of Marciano Rosela as their Teniente del Barrio.
Cotmon	485.30	Rural	UADC	As the people of this barangay, the name was derived from the name of the tree that once thrived the place. That tree was called kutmon in the locality. Later, the form was changed and Hispanicized, thus the form being used today, as was with the naming of most places. The kutmon is katmon in the Filipino language's orthography.	
Cotnogan	231.13	Rural	RADC		In the early years of Spanish rule, there existed a river teeming with fish and one species is locally known as COTNOG which later became HIRABO. As the tale says: One day, a Guardia Civil arrived in their place and passed a group of residents fishing on that famous river. He approached the residents asking for the name of a place, but the natives did not fully understand what the Spaniards wanted. They answered COTNOG AN, COTNOG AN, (in rinconada accent) thinking of the name of the fish from that day the place became known as COTNOGAN.
Danao	383.50	Rural	UADC		The story about Danao lake can be traced in the year 1800. As narrated by old folks, there was this family whose daughter will be married that day. Near to their house was a brook shaped in a circular form and which is the bathing area for water buffalo. That brook was surrounded by tall trees and shrubs making the place dark. The mother ignored her, but the old woman approached the cook who gave her food. After eating, the old woman told the cook to leave the place, because something will happen. As soon as the cook left, the old woman disappeared. Then the sky & surroundings became dark & a tornado (buhawi in Tagalog) hit the place causing the formation of the lake now known as Danao lake. It was told that except for the cook, all the residents of the area perished.
Gabon	88.67	Urban	Poblacion		Barangay GABON came about as a settlement area that originated from a place grown with abundant trees. It was owned by one family only, the Orbon Family. The name of the barangay was coined after the word "GARABON" which means divide or occupy. After its formal establishment and creation as an independent political unit, Barangay Gabon experienced significant political, social and economic changes under the able administration of successive barangay officials.
Gamot	345.17	Rural	UADC		Barangay Gamot get its name in the times of Japanese regime where people of this barangay used to hide in roots (which is gamot in the Bicol language or dialect) of large trees, to escape slavery or death from the Japanese.
Itaran	312.09	Rural	UADC		After Japanese war and early 50's the Aeta's were lived in this place, then on mid-50's Spanish Mestizos Tu-anqui's clan came over and fired their guns on the air, the aeta's scared ran with fear and fled the place, the Tu-anqui's take over and pre-occupied the place and during this time Emili-ano Sabordo was chosen as the Cab-eza de Barangay and he named this “ AETARAN “ which he derived from Aeta's who live and Ran whom run-ning the place. On early 60's by the time of Kapitan Alejandro Victoria and named it ITARAN.
Kinale	176.39	Urban	Poblacion		
Kinuartelan	341.27	Rural	UADC		
La Medalla	368.27	Rural	RADC		According to the history of this barangay, the name “LA MEDALLA” was derived from their patroness saint “STA LA MEDALLA”. It was known during the early times that the barrio has vas and fertile agricultural land, and because of this, settlers from nearby places migrated to this barrio to venture in agricultural farming. One of the early settlers who migrated to this barrio came from barrio La Medalla, town of Iriga (now a City) of the Province of Camarines Sur; they were so industrious, hardworking and adventurous. They brought along with them their patroness saint, Sta, La Medalla as they settled in this place. And, as a token of gratitude, they donated their patroness saint to the barrio. And with this, the resident decided that Sta. La Medalla be their patroness saint in their barrio in the honor of her, thus, it became barrio La Medalla. The 1st Teniente del barrio” (now known as PABLO BALANG, followed in succession, by SANTOS LAYNES, SANTOS AMOROSO, NEMESIO RAMBOYONG, MARTIN CERVANTES, RESTITUTO BALANG, AMANDO BARRA & presently by OLIVA O. SALCEDO) Barangay La Medalla is situated at the North-Western part of Polangui with a distance of approximately 8.5 kilometers far from centro Poblacion, located along the North: Barangay Lourdes, South: Barangay Apad, Santicon, West: Barangay La Purisima & East: Barangay Kinuartelan. Its topography was plain, Mountainous (Bulod ) and Hilly. Its classification was Poblacion, coastals, along the highway & Interior. Barangay La Medalla is divided into (7) Puroks managed by Purok Leaders & Advisers. It has an exciting complete Elementary School established in 1933 and a high school established on 1992. It has a Barangay Hall, Health Center and a Day Care Center. Residents buy their daily basic provision in a few sari-sari stores but most of the time they prefer to but in a town proper during market day. Today, like other barangay in Polangui, La Medalla is loving forward for progress. The only problem which the residents are facing now is transportation wherein only motorcycle is the only means because of rough roads connecting the barangay to poblacion.
Lanigay	313.06	Rural	RADC		Barangay Lanigay located in the Municipality of Polangui, Province of Albay. According to the old folks, this place was known to be ” Mother Barangay”. It was once known as “Layugay”. The following barangays namely: Maysua, Lidong, Pintor, Cepres, and other places in the eastern part of Polangui reaching as far as La Purisima and some portions of Gabon, Sugcad, Ilaod, Kinale and Balangibang were once part of Lanigay. The term name Layugay refers to the “take-off portion received from the lowlands and the “landing portion” received from the upland areas. It was due to the terrain place that the name Layugay was derived. As years gone by, the Mother Barangay was divided and of its sitios was separated and became independent and comprises the Municipality of Polangui. The Mother Barangay became smaller as regards its territorial jurisdiction and area. What was left of the Mother Barangay renamed Lanigay from it former name Layugay by then Teniente Del Barrio, who facilitated said action with the members of Consejo Municipal. Early in 1654, Father Alonzo de San Juan followed by Magdalena and founded the barrios of Lanigay, Ponso, Balinad with 230 wooden houses and one thousand nipa. Fr. San Juan erected in Lanigay the town's first Polangui Church edifice which was made of wood and light materials. With these, Lanigay then became the town's center. The church edifice that Fr. San Juan built was razed ground by a conflagration that affected also the rest houses surrounding it. He constructed a new edifice this time made of bricks and stones. But because Lanigay flood-prone area, he relocated the edifice and construct new church edifice.
La Purisima	493.02	Rural	RADC		
Lidong	121.26	Rural	UADC	Lidong was the center of commerce back then. The 'saūd' or market, where the 'agtâs' bartered their goods with rice from the vast 'uma' or rice farms of 'Langtad' and 'Lidong', as well as with fresh-caught fish from Lake Buhi, was near where the two tributary rivers that meet to form one river. The water in the area where the rivers meet swirls so that when the traders from one side crosses with their 'balsa' gets 'nauseated' or in local term 'libūng'. Soon the corruption and Hispanicization of the word arrived to its present form.	
Lourdes	348.71	Rural	UADC		
Magpanambo	251.87	Rural	RADC		
Magurang	115.22	Urban	Poblacion		Literally, Magurang in English translation, means many old residents. Hence, maybe long before the coming of the Spaniards this Barangay was over-polluted by old people, such that the place was called such name. At least, this is one conception. I – HOW MAGURANG GOT ITS NAME It was in the early part of the year 1854, Rev. Father Alonzo de San Juan, an encargado, founded three barrios, namely; Lanigay, Ponso and Balinad. These were all planted with coconuts and abaca. When visiting these barrios from Lanigay to Ponso, he passed by a way which was so under develop. There were two rave wooden houses and a few number of nipa huts which were built far from each other, father Alonzo de San Juan called the place sitio. By the coming of Rev. Father Bautista Marza in the later part of the 19th century, roads and bridges were constructed. One day Father Marza passed by the under-constructed roads. H e greeted the people along the way and asked what the name of sitio is in Spanish Language. An old woman answered “kami mga gurang” (we are old already). Father Marza thought that the response of the old people was the real name of the place. From that time on, he called the Place “MAGURANG”. The Place MAGURANG was developed by Father Marza. People were baptized and converted to Christianity. Since then, MAGURANG become the name of the sitio.
Matacon	317.64	Urban	Poblacion		According to the legend, Barangay Matacon was used to be a no man's land. Long time ago, this place as known for its thick forest and people passing by to reach Polangui, Poblacion were being harassed by bandits. As years passed by the word of fear or “ MATAKOT” in Bicol dialect was instilled in the minds of the people when referring to this place. In the years that followed, people soon began to migrate and found out that the place was not “Matakot” anymore. Most of them soon have land holding means of livelihood that is soon became a community. The people did not find difficult in naming the place, they only had to changed “MATAKOT” to a better sounding word “MATACON”, hence the name was adopted by the people from that time on. Barangay Matacon is bounded on the North East, by Barangay Salvacion, on the South by the Kinale River, East by Barangay Balangibang, on the North-West by Barangay Cotnogan.
Maynaga	262.39	Rural	UADC		During the Spanish rule, this place was thickly forested areas inhabited by aetas. On how this place got its name, history says that, one day a Spaniard met an aeta and inquired where he got the vine "buyo" he was carrying, he told the Spaniard of the place "Pongol", a small stream where hundreds of narra trees ( "naga" in local dialect) thrives. With the natives answer "sa may naga", instilled in the mind of the Spaniard thus the place being remember and eventually name as sitio " Maynaga". Like other barangays in Polangui, Maynaga was once a sitio of barrio "layugay" (now barangay lanigay) in the early years of the Spanish rule.it was only during the implementation of the barrio charter in 1960's when it became an independent barangay through a resolution by then Municipal Councilor Iluminado Relleve, was principal author creating the barangay. "Sta. Del Rosario"is the patroness of barangay Maynaga. The chapel stand on the lot donated by the late Ignacio Tuanqui in 1951. Aside from a Roman Catholic group Maynaga has a (2) other religious sects. Iglesia Ni Cristo, the born again Christian ministry, but generally, Maynaga is a catholic barangay. In the late 80's, Maynaga elementary school was established, with the barangay itself purchasing a lot for the school site. The barangay at present has its own "barangay center where the barangay hall, barangay pavilion, police outpost, health center, and the day care center proudly stands. In terms of tourist attraction, barangay Maynaga has now a private owned and well developed resort, the " highlander watering hole resort, it has a big swimming pool supplied with fresh and cold free flowing water, a lodging house, and canteen.it can also be used as a reception area for various occasions. It caters not only to local but also to foreign tourist. Among those leaders who hold position and strived for the development of the barangay, are the following: as "Teniente Del Barrio" Pio Alcoy (first Teniente del barrio), Eutiquio Pinon, Estilitocanaria, and Toribio Aplaya. When the positionof barangay captain, toribio aplaya was the first elected barangay captain, followed by Isaac Esplana, Justino Ranada, Josefina Ranada, And Ruben S. Loyola, and presently by Barangay Captain Joel S. Loyola.
Maysua	430.15	Rural	UADC		
Mendez	165.90	Rural	UADC		
Napo	361.85	Rural	UADC		
Pinagdapugan	190.91	Rural	UADC		
Pintor (Binangbangan)	182.94	Rural	UADC		
Ponso	317.91	Urban	Poblacion		
Salvacion	175.99	Rural	RADC		
San Roque	301.32	Rural	RADC		Barangay San Roque is in Polangui, Albay and it was foundered in the year 1930 by the author Lorenzo Villar and other persons as cofounder namely; Cepriano Seletaria, Cenon Sayson, Julian Villar, Felipe Sayson, Roman Corporal, Cleto Barce all deceased. The named San Roque originated from the patron Saint San Roque was owned by the couple Mr. and Mrs. Lorenzo Villar. His wife Aurelia Villar bought the image from a peddler out of the money which was intended for their family consumption. Having no permission from her husband got so angry and uttered distasteful words to her about the image. The following day her husband felt bad and got bedridden for so many days. Such that he could not do his farm works which badly needed his tending and attention. All the herbal Doctors he sought failed to cure his ailment. His wife Aurelia suggested to him to ask for forgiveness from the image San Roque for the things he done and said. All of a sudden, he got well. Lorenzo Villar asked an apology to the image and after that his sickness was cured. The couple witnessed several miracles made by the image of San Roque. The couple decided to construct a chapel for the image with the help of the co-founders. They came to the consensus that the place he named SAN ROQUE, the honour the miraculous image. The land area has approximately 301.3161 hectares. San Roque has a total population of 1,635 people. The residents celebrate the Barangay Fiesta on the 16th day of August every year. Most of the people of San Roque depend on farming as their means of livelihood. They rais copra, palay, banana, root crops, cattle, swine, poultry and firewood. Because the soil of San Roque is no longer so fertile for farming. Some resident lead to migrate to Metro Manila to seek for employment at present there are a few who have the jobs as OFWs. The residents together with the local Officials requested the school authorities to the Bureau of Public Schools for a classroom and teacher to thought the Grade 1 pupils. In the year 1958 was the first graduation exercises held in this Elementary School. The school site was donated by Mrs. Igleceria Ibo Seletaria in 1941. At present the school has staff of 9 teacher headed by a head teacher,90 professional come from Barangay San Roque. San Roque has a tourist spot said to be KUMAKAWA or rounded hill.
Santicon	393.38	Rural	RADC		Prior to the establishment of Polangui, the first known “pueblo” was Lanigay. When the recognized town was named Polangui, Lanigay existed as one of its barrios. It had a wide area of coverage and Santicon was a part of it as a Sitio named after its patron saint, San Antonio. Early residents of the Barrio/Sitio correlated its name to two big places of stone striking each other at night time and because of friction it even produced a spark of light. Local term related by the people to the action of the stones was “santic”. The continuous action of the stones and use of the term by the people, it is changed to “Santicon” and thus the name Santicon came to being, as the name of the barrio. It was in 1928, when Santicon was separated from Lanigay and known to be a duly recognized barrio with 13 households. At the time of its separation, there were only 18 families who pioneered the inhabitants and they were the following; Sabaybay, Olicia, Sarion, Casiao, Carullo, Ravago, Seletaria, Salem, Dacara, Nepomuceno, Oliquino, Lacsina, Cao, Recaña, Carillo, Bertumen, Penetrante and Resureccion. Its separation/creation was made possible through the efforts of Vito Cao, the appointed Teniente and at the same time donated the lot where the chapel was erected. Heads of the barrio: (past to present and from Teniente to Captain Vito Cao, Timoteo Dacara, Gregorio Carullo, Francisco Resureccion, Enrique Sapiera, Rufino Olicia, Melicio Sanorjo, Vicente Olicia, Teodorico Casiao, Benito Quiquino, Felipe Ravago, Justiniano Nepomuceno, Rodrigo Vargas, Jose Lustan, Felicisimo Casiao and Arnulfo B. Penetrante from December 1, 2007(to date). And the first Barangay Captain Who finished the (3) consecutive terms. The school its development: Part of its development and progress, a public elementary school was opened in 1949. This took place because of the desire of the people to possibly make every resident of the barrio literate. It took the people much pains and sacrifices in trying to start the operation of the school, and out of their painstaking activation the glory is being present by the present generation. The school site was acquired through donation, June 3, 1949 (5000 sq. M) and purchase July 13, 1951 (5000 sq. M.) From Leodogario Resanes Sarion. Since its opening to present, there are the school heads resigned and through/contributed much to its improvement and progress. They are; Lauriano Ronda, Martin Sabio, Silvestre Salalima, Vito Salinel, Humberto Gonsales, Luz Vasquez, Juan Briones, Rizalina Bobis, Aludia Rempillo, Alberto S. Sapaula, Jimmy Camba, and Mr. Benjamin Rances, Milagros Sanorjo to date. Its linkage to the poblacion was made easier through the construction of roads and bridges, unlike before that the people had to stretch a trail. Transportation is no longer a problem. To give credit to all people/residents of Santicon, who made their Barangay as it is now. People who were ambitious, industrious, peace-loving, self-reliant and above all, Progress oriented.
Santa Cruz	280.51	Rural	UADC		
Santa Teresita	285.13	Rural	RADC		Barangay Sta. Teresita named of petroness, SAINT THERESE OF THE CHILD JESUS now Sta. Teresita. It was founded in 1955 with Davd B. dela Cruz serving as its First Teniente del Barrio and was assisted by, Raymundo Garcia, Teofilo Bagacina, Teofilo Borja Sr., Esteban Sanado, Victorino Nacario, Salustiano Corporal, Segundino Dacara. It is formerly a sitio of Magpanambo known as **MALAYAGAN** and become a 42nd Independent Barangay of Polangui, Albay in 1955. The Barangay Site and the School Site was donated by family of Patricio Dela Cruz, Other part of Barangay was derived from other neighboring Barangay*s (San Roque, La Medalla & La Purisima .The boundaries areas follows SOUTH Brgy. San Roque, EAST Brgy. La Purisima and Brgy. La Medalla and WEST Brgy. Magpanambo. The first Teacher was administered by the late Loreta Redada and the first Priest was Rev. Domingo Alberto.
Sugcad	372.85	Urban	Poblacion		
Ubaliw	221.44	Urban	Poblacion		The origin of the name UBALIW can be attributed to the presence of a creek that divides the Sitios of Centro Oriental and Ubaliw - known for other name during the early days. Centro then was the center of Poblacion, and Ubaliw then was known as BALIU. As told by older folks, the creek which used to be narrow became wider when Typhoon Jean hit the place in the 50s. In the early 1920, the place was still a forested area with about fifteen household. Wild pigs, carabaos, and other animals roamed freely, thus the place was known for its being dirty community. Ubaliw and Basud used to be a single barrio. Lupe Mirabueno was the First Teniente del Barrio. Among those who served as Teniente del Barrio were Placio Refelino, Leon Salinel, Emilio Refran Sr., and Pedro Sagrit. Then followed by Barangay Captain Adriana Santayana, Rizalina Sapo, Armando Sariba, Jose A. Zamora and Josefina D. Bejer.

== Demographics ==
Population census of Polangui
Year	Pop.	±% p.a.
1903	7,960	—
1918	13,327	+3.50%
1939	21,086	+2.21%
1948	27,623	+3.05%
1960	38,374	+2.78%
1970	48,586	+2.38%
1975	52,541	+1.58%
1980	55,610	+1.14%
1990	61,556	+1.02%
1995	67,314	+1.69%
2000	70,451	+0.98%
2007	77,122	+1.26%
2010	82,307	+2.40%
2015	88,221	+1.33%
2020	89,176	+0.23%
2024	89,344	+0.05%
Source: Philippine Statistics Authority

In the 2024 census, Polangui had a population of 89,344 people. The population density was 610 inhabitants per square kilometre (1,600/sq mi).

PSGC	Barangay	Population			±% p.a.	
		2024		2010		
050514001	Agos	4.1%	3,631	3,356	▴	0.54%
050514002	Alnay	2.7%	2,398	2,194	▴	0.61%
050514003	Alomon	1.4%	1,285	1,167	▴	0.66%
050514004	Amoguis	0.6%	506	518	▾	−0.16%
050514005	Anopol	1.3%	1,155	1,085	▴	0.43%
050514006	Apad	1.9%	1,665	1,323	▴	1.59%
050514007	Balaba	1.9%	1,697	1,355	▴	1.56%
050514008	Balangibang	1.9%	1,716	1,600	▴	0.48%
050514009	Balinad	3.6%	3,256	3,032	▴	0.49%
050514010	Basud	4.2%	3,752	3,408	▴	0.66%
050514011	Binagbangan (Pintor)	1.0%	922	918	▴	0.03%
050514012	Buyo	1.2%	1,066	990	▴	0.51%
050514013	Centro Occidental (Pob.)	4.0%	3,578	3,384	▴	0.38%
050514014	Centro Oriental (Pob.)	2.7%	2,393	2,264	▴	0.38%
050514015	Cepres	1.7%	1,529	1,414	▴	0.54%
050514016	Cotmon	0.7%	652	529	▴	1.45%
050514017	Cotnogan	1.8%	1,652	1,405	▴	1.12%
050514018	Danao	1.3%	1,131	879	▴	1.75%
050514019	Gabon	3.8%	3,381	3,223	▴	0.33%
050514020	Gamot	1.6%	1,424	1,395	▴	0.14%
050514022	Itaran	2.1%	1,902	1,740	▴	0.61%
050514023	Kinale	2.7%	2,402	2,204	▴	0.59%
050514024	Kinuartilan	0.7%	594	587	▴	0.08%
050514025	La Medalla	1.0%	855	841	▴	0.11%
050514026	La Purisima	0.6%	572	613	▾	−0.47%
050514027	Lanigay	4.3%	3,830	3,592	▴	0.44%
050514028	Lidong	1.7%	1,563	1,355	▴	0.99%
050514029	Lourdes	0.8%	733	594	▴	1.45%
050514030	Magpanambo	1.5%	1,342	1,361	▾	−0.10%
050514031	Magurang	4.3%	3,884	3,846	▴	0.07%
050514032	Matacon	4.9%	4,398	4,148	▴	0.40%
050514033	Maynaga	1.5%	1,349	1,361	▾	−0.06%
050514034	Maysua	1.1%	1,004	891	▴	0.82%
050514035	Mendez	1.1%	1,025	991	▴	0.23%
050514036	Napo	3.9%	3,448	3,113	▴	0.70%
050514037	Pinagdapugan	1.1%	969	888	▴	0.60%
050514039	Ponso	5.6%	5,039	4,927	▴	0.15%
050514040	Salvacion	1.4%	1,208	1,088	▴	0.72%
050514041	San Roque	1.9%	1,687	1,533	▴	0.66%
050514042	Santicon	3.2%	2,878	2,744	▴	0.33%
050514043	Santa Cruz	0.7%	639	652	▾	−0.14%
050514044	Santa Teresita	1.0%	855	927	▾	−0.55%
050514045	Sugcad	4.5%	3,986	3,637	▴	0.63%
050514046	Ubaliw	3.7%	3,270	3,235	▴	0.07%
	Total		89,344	82,307	▴	0.56%

=== Language ===
Bikol Polangueño is the main dialect in Polangui, classified under Oasnon/West Miraya Bikol language. The majority of the population speak Tagalog and English. Other languages/dialects spoken are Bicolano Viejo and Bikol Rinconada (Agos-Matacon Area).

=== Religion ===
Christianity is the predominant religion with Roman Catholicism having the biggest practitioners. The four (4) Roman Catholic Parishes of Polangui is grouped as part of the Third Vicariate under the Roman Catholic Diocese of Legazpi. The Parishes are:

- Sts. Peter and Paul Parish in Barangay Centro Occidental (main parish)
- St. Dominic Guzman Parish in Barangay Matacon
- St. Anthony of Padua Parish in Barangay Ponso
- Our Lady of Guadalupe Parish in Barangay Lidong

All of the barangays have their respective patron saints and barangay chapels.

Other Christian denominations present in the municipality include Protestants, Baptist, United Pentecostal Church, and Iglesia ni Cristo. Islam and Buddhism also have followers in the municipality.

== Economy ==
2020 Financial Highlights
Category	Value (in million PHP)
Total Assets	955.170
Total Liabilities	298.517
Total Equity	656.653
Total Revenues	334.342
Total Expenses	310.599
Excess Income Over Expenses	23.743

Poverty incidence of Polangui (%)

Source: Philippine Statistics Authority

Polangui is classified as a first-class municipality as per DOF Order No. 20-05, dated July 29, 2005.

=== Agriculture ===
Its economy is still heavily dependent on agriculture. Major crops include rice, corn, cacao, pili, root crops, vegetables, coconuts and abacá. Poultry and livestock raising are also very much alive.

=== Shopping centers ===
Major business commercial establishments include the Bicol's largest mall chain, Liberty Commercial Center (LCC). The municipality has also attracted investments from national retail chains such as the recently opened Xentro Mall Polangui.

== Tourism and culture ==
=== Attractions ===
Polangui provides a good view of Mount Mayon. The town hosts various historical and cultural tourism spots and other tourism-oriented recreation centers. Among these are:

==== Public parks ====
- Sabido Park
- Parish Patio
- Kiwanis Children's Park

==== Nature parks ====
- Lake Danao Natural Park in Barangay Danao is a small, scenic crater lake, located 15 kilometres (9.3 mi) from the town proper. It is nestled between Mount Malinao and Mount Masaraga. The rare tabios or sinarapan (Mystichtys luzonensis), the world's smallest fish, is also cultured here. The lake is a 30-minute hike through carabao trails and abaca plantations.
- Saint Expeditus Eco-Park is part of the Zepeda Leisure Estates, located at Barangay Agos. Its primary activities such as nature trailing, birdwatching, horseback riding and camping, among others.
- Bastian Wildlife Center

==== Leisure and sports parks ====
- Zepeda Leisure Estates situated at Barangay Agos, offers a variety of amenities and facilities such as the Albay's first golf course, a driving range, a spring resort, camping grounds, lodge cabin, a restaurant, picnic area and a nature trail. Aside from playing golf and throwing in a picnic, available activities also includes pitch and putt, birdwatching and horseback riding.
- Polangui Tennis Club at Barangay Centro Occidental
- JGL Gamefarm at Barangay Ubaliw
- Salceda Sports Complex at Barangay Centro Oriental

=== Festivals and events ===
- Polangui Town Fiesta — started as "Oyangui Festival" in 2003 and later became "Pulang Angui Festival". It is an annual celebration of Polangueños during the whole month of June.
- Semana Santa (Holy Week) — The procession of pasos (Holy images) during Viernes Santo (Good Friday) has attracted devotees and local tourist alike because of the colorful and grandiose life-sized rebultos (statues) depicting the Passion of Christ and His resurrection installed on top of ornately decorated and lighter carrozas or cars. Many of the images and sculpture are of great antiquity and of magnificent artistry. Some of them are even centuries-old, like the image of St. Peter which dates back to 1857 as an heirloom piece.
- Karangahan sa Polangui — is Polangui's adaptation of the month-long celebration of the province's Karangahan sa Pasko: Albay Green Christmas, usually starting during the last week of November throughout December. Karangahan originated from the Bicolano term, ranga, which pertains to a higher level of joy and contentment; a term of endearment. The festival is aimed at the safety of both families and environment by means of an environment-friendly celebration which can be achieved through continued propagation and adherence to its original campaign which is the "plastic-free, smoke-free and zero casualty" advocacy and objectives of the province. Before it was even called Karangahan sa Polangui, Polangueños are already celebrating it as Tia Angui Festival, a concoction of the name of the town's maiden, Angui (Tiya Angui), from which the town derived its name. Likewise, it may be interpreted as tiangge, a local term for "bazaar", which flood the town's public market during Christmas season. Usually, it is a tight gridwork of crowded stalls peddling Christmas decorations, fireworks, fresh fruits, assorted toys, discounted clothes, jewelry, accessories, electronics, and handicrafts, in the hallways and other empty spaces.

=== Local products and delicacies ===
- Calamay (sankaka) – also spelled kalamay which means "sugar", is a sticky sweet delicacy that is popular in many regions of the Philippines. It is locally known in Polangui as sankaka and is made of coconut milk, brown sugar, and ground glutinous rice. Kalamay can be eaten alone but is usually used as a sweetener for a number of Filipino desserts and beverages. The town's largest natural producer of sankaka is the Sarilla's Muscovado Milling Facility at Barangay Balaba.
- Rice Cakes
  - Ibos – is made from glutinous rice cooked in coconut milk, and often steamed wrapped in buli or buri palm (Corypha) leaves. It is usually eaten sprinkled with sugar.
  - Balinsuso – is a Bicolano suman made up of ground rice (ordinary or sticky rice), coconut milk, sugar and grated coconut. In other towns, they call it balisongsong.
  - Binûtong – is made up of glutinous rice with coconut cream, wrapped in banana leaves. This is often served as breakfast or merienda, and best paired with hot chocolate or coffee. The term itself, probably came from the root word "butok" or to "tie a knot" as the mouthwatering meal is wrapped and tied in layers of banana leaves in order to confine the flavors inside white it is being cooked. The banana leaves gives a wonderful flavor to the rice.
- Sinapot – is a local term for maruya. These are sliced bananas dipped in batter, deep fried and dredged in sugar. All are popular street food and is best eaten during merienda.
- Biniribid – is made from grated lukadon (young coconut)/coconut milk, and flour, topped with a mixture of kalamay and brown sugar. Its name is a Bikol term for twisted, as it is usually curled to form an eight much like twisted bread. Like the sinapot, it is also best eaten during merienda.
- Pili – Of the family Burseraceae, pili (Canarium ovatum) is native to the Philippines and can be found in especially in the Bicol region where it is an important crop and source of income of many families. Pili is a versatile nut being used for a variety of products. The nut kernel is the most important product. It can be eaten raw or roasted where its mild, nutty taste and tender-crispy texture can compare with and even found better than an almond. Pili kernel is also used in chocolate, ice cream, and baked goods. The young shoots and the fruit pulp are edible. The shoots are used in salads, and the pulp is eaten after it is boiled and seasoned. Boiled pili pulp resembles the sweet potato in texture, it is oily (about 12%) and is considered to have food value similar to that of avocado. Pulp oil can be extracted and used for cooking or as a substitute for cottonseed oil in the manufacture of soap and edible products. The stony shells are excellent fuel or growth medium for orchids and ornamental plants.

=== Cultural properties ===
==== Historical markers ====
This list contains an overview of the government-recognized historical markers installed by the National Historical Commission of the Philippines (NHCP) in Polangui that have been commemorated by cast-iron plaques permanently installed in publicly visible locations on buildings, monuments, or in special locations. While many cultural properties have historical markers installed, not all places marked with historical markers are designated into one of the particular categories of Cultural Properties.

Marker title
Camilo Jacob
Inscription

                                   CAMILO JACOB
                                   REBOLUSYONARYO AT ISA SA QUINCE MARTIRES NG BIKOL. ISINILANG SA POLANGUI, ALBAY, KALAGITNAAN NG IKA-19 NA SIGLO. NAGING KASAPI NG TRIANGULO, BIKOL, ISANG MASONERIYA SA CAMARINES NA NAGHANGAD NA MAPABUTI ANG KALAGAYAN NG BAYAN. DINAKIP AT NILITIS NG KORTE MILITAR DAHIL SA BINTANG NA REBELYON, 29 DISYEMBRE 1896.  BINARIL SA BAGUMBAYAN KASAMA ANG IBA PANG MGA BIKOLANONG NAHATULANG REBELDE NG MGA ESPANYOL, 4 ENERO 1897.

Category
Structure
Type
Monument
Description
One of the Fifteen Martyrs of Bicol. A mason from Camarines who sought better conditions for the country.
Barangay
Centro Occidental, in front of the Sangguniang Bayan building
Coordinates
13.293314°N 123.483979°E
Language
Filipino
Date Issued
March 7, 2017
Image

==== Religious landmarks ====
- The Saints Peter and Paul Parish Church is located at Barangay Centro Occidental. It is one of the oldest Catholic churches in the Philippines, which took 10 years to finish. The church construction was started in 1654 by Fr. Alonzo de San Juan and was finished in 1664 under the management of Fr. Juan Bautista Marza.
- Santo Entierro Shrine
- Angustia / La Pieta Shrine

==== Monuments ====
- The Pedro Sabido Monument was constructed as a dedication to former Philippine Senator, Pedro Sabido, who was born in Polangui on October 19, 1894, to Don Juan D. Sabido and Doña Maximina Ribaya. His monument is located at the Sabido Park, beside the Office of the Sangguniang Bayan. A provincial road, the Pedro Sabido Road, was also dedicated in his honor. It serves as a major transport road which connects the municipality of Polangui to the municipalities of Oas, the City of Ligao and the First District of Albay.
- The Veterans' Memorial was constructed as a dedication to the fallen sons of Polangui who died and shed their blood during the Japanese military occupation in World War II. The memorial is located in front of the Polangui Tennis Club.
- Cristo Rey

== Transportation ==
=== Airport ===
The nearest airport is in Bicol International Airport, about 39.1 kilometres (24.3 mi) from Polangui. It is served by Philippine Airlines and Cebu Pacific, with daily flights to and from Manila and Cebu. Since December 2, 2024, Cebu Pacific has also operated flights to Iloilo on Mondays, Wednesdays, and Fridays.

=== Seaport ===
Polangui is a landlocked municipality, entirely enclosed by land. The nearest ports from Polangui are Pantao Port in Libon, Pio Duran Port in Pio Duran, Legazpi Seaport in Legazpi City, and Tabaco International Seaport in Tabaco City.

=== Railways ===
In March 2012, the 10 1/2-hour Mayon Limited started traveling between Manila and Ligao City, but later ceased operations. In 2016, operation of the PNR Southrail Line resumed with one round trip between Naga City and Legazpi City, and served the town through the Polangui railway station. However, it was also stopped due to issues on maintenance and public safety.

=== Roads and bridges ===
==== Road network ====
Roads in Polangui are classified into:

- National roads
  - Maharlika Highway (AH26)
  - Matacon-Libon-Polangui Jct Rd (N638)
  - Albay West Coast Rd
  - Polangui Poblacion Rd
- Provincial roads
  - Senator Pedro R. Sabido Rd
  - Buhi-Polangui Rd
- Municipal roads
- Barangay roads

==== Mode of access ====
Polangui can be reached through land transport (by bus) from Manila in about 10 hours, two hours less if the new (Andaya Highway) route is taken. Main routes can be reached through by aircon buses, Garage to Terminal (GT) Vans and FX (location and access to is underway with the new Polangui Terminal), private cars, trimobiles, padyak and motorcycles.

In order to spur development in the municipality, the Toll Regulatory Board declared Toll Road 5 the extension of South Luzon Expressway. A 420-kilometer, four lane expressway starting from the terminal point of the now under construction SLEX Toll Road 4 at Barangay Mayao, Lucena City in Quezon to Matnog, Sorsogon, near the Matnog Ferry Terminal. On August 25, 2020, San Miguel Corporation announced that they will invest the project which will reduce travel time from Lucena to Matnog from 9 hours to 5.5 hours.

== Communication ==
=== Radio stations ===
A local FM Station, Hot FM Polangui DWJJ 97.9 MHz, broadcasts live updates, news and entertainment. The municipality also receives signal from all major radio stations from Legazpi City and even Naga City in Camarines Sur.

=== TV stations ===
There is one TV relay station operating in the municipality (ABS-CBN). However, local TVs get strong signals from nearby Legazpi City and Naga City relay stations. Cable services are also offered in the area by two companies:

- Dream Cable Television (DCTV)
- Estevez Cable Television (ESTV)

=== Telephone ===
There are two existing telephone lines in Polangui:

- Bayan Telecommunications (BayanTel)
- Philippine Long Distance Telephone Company (PLDT)

=== Cellular telephone sites ===
The municipality is served by the Philippines' three main mobile phone carriers:

- Smart Communications
- Globe Telecom
- Dito Telecommunity

== Education ==
There are two schools district offices which govern all educational institutions within the municipality. They oversee the management and operations of all private and public, from primary to secondary schools. These are the:

- Polangui North Schools District
- Polangui South Schools District

Presently, there are almost 20 Day Care Centers, 3 private pre-schools, 42 public elementary schools, 5 private elementary schools, 7 public high schools, 3 private high schools and 4 tertiary schools in the municipality.

=== Tertiary / vocational / technical education ===
The municipality has four tertiary schools:

- The Bicol University Polangui Campus (BUPC) is located in Barangay Centro Occidental, and used to be known as the School for Philippine Craftsmen and offered vocational courses. It was integrated into Bicol University, through R.A. 7722, R.A. 8292 & R.A. 8769, on December 14, 2000, and renamed as Bicol University Polangui Campus. From the five courses offered in 2000, it now offers fifteen courses including BS in Nursing, BS in Computer Engineering and BS in Electronics and Communications Engineering.
- The Polangui Community College (PCC) has four major program offerings: Associate in Hotel & Restaurant Management, Associate in Office Administration, Bachelor in Secondary Education and Bachelor of Science in Agribusiness.
- The Elite Fashion School, which offers technical and vocational courses. It is located at Barangay Centro Oriental, in front of the Land Bank of the Philippines- Polangui Branch.
- The Computer Arts and Technological (CAT) College, which was opened in 2012. It is located at the newly constructed commercial building at Barangay Ubaliw, beside the Polangui Terminal.

=== Secondary education ===
==== Public high schools ====
- The Polangui General Comprehensive High School is located in Barangay Centro Occidental, and started as Albay High School Polangui (AHSP) with Mr. Sisenando Reantaso as its first Principal (1948–1953). In 1963, President Diosdado Macapagal signed RA No. 3993 converting the AHSP into a community school, The Polangui General Comprehensive High School (PGCHS), a national secondary school patterned after the comprehensive high school in Detroit, Michigan U.S.A.
- Ponso National High School
- Matacon National High School
- Magpanambo National High School
- Itaran National High School
- La Medalla National High School
- Lanigay National High School
- Maysua High School
- Balangibang Integrated School
- Kinuartelan Integrated School

==== Private high schools ====
- Salle Learning Center at Barangay Centro Occidental
- Saint Peter's Academy at Barangay Centro Occidental
- Colegio de Santa Monica of Polangui, Inc. at Barangay Centro Occidental

=== Primary education ===
==== Public elementary schools ====
- Polangui South Central School at Barangay Centro Oriental, along the National Highway. It is the flagship school of the Polangui South District. Its satellite schools are the following:
- Agos Elementary School
- Alomon Elementary School
- Apad Elementary School
- Balangibang Integrated School
- Cotnogan Elementary School
- Kinale Elementary School
- Lanigay Elementary School
- La Medalla Elementary School
- La Purisima Elementary School
- Magpanambo Elementary School
- Magurang Elementary School
- Matacon Elementary School
- Santicon Elementary School
- Salvacion Elementary School
- San Roque Elementary School
- Santa Teresita Elementary School
- Polangui North Central School at Barangay Centro Oriental. It is the flagship school of the Polangui North District. Its satellite schools are the following:
- Alnay Elementary School
- Balaba Elementary School
- Balinad Elementary School
- Cepres Elementary School
- Cotmon Elementary School
- Dalogo Elementary School
- Danao Elementary School
- Itaran Elementary School
- Jose S. Duran Elementary School
- Kinuartelan Integrated School
- Lidong Elementary School
- Lourdes Elementary School
- Maynaga Elementary School
- Maysua Elementary School
- Mendez Elementary School
- Napo Elementary School
- Pinagdapugan Elementary School
- Pintor Elementary School
- Ponso North Elementary School
- Ponso South Elementary School
- Santa Cruz Elementary School
- Sugcad Elementary School
- Luis Severa Matza Elementary School

==== Private elementary schools ====
- Salle Learning Center at Barangay Centro Occidental
- Saint Peter's Academy at Barangay Centro Occidental
- Global Vision Excellence School at Barangay Basud
- Polangui SDA Multigrade School at Barangay Basud
- Colegio de Santa Monica of Polangui, Inc. at Barangay Centro Occidental
- Noah’s Learning Center Inc. at Barangay Magurang

=== Day care and pre-school ===
==== Private Pre-schools ====
- Salle Learning Center at Barangay Centro Occidental
- Saint Peter's Academy at Barangay Centro Occidental
- Global Vision Excellence School at Barangay Basud
- Saint Noah's Learning Center at Barangay Magurang
- Golden Wisdom Proverbial School at Barangay Gabon

== Public services ==
=== Healthcare ===
The present health services of the municipality are administered by 2 Municipal Health Officers, 2 Public Health Nurses, 1 Medical Technologist, 1 Dentist, and 12 Midwives.

Aside from the Municipal Health Office and Barangay Health Stations, there are 2 Private Hospitals (Isip General Hospital in Gabon and Perillo General Hospital in Magurang), and 14 clinics that provide alternative health services to the population of the municipality. Polangui is equipped with 6 ambulances- 1 in the Rural Health Unit (RHU), 2 in the municipal hall, and 3 in the health station centers in Balinad, Itaran and Matacon.

The Basic Emergency Obstetric and Newborn Care (BEmONC) Birthing Facility at RHU-Polangui specializes in maternal healthcare, along with several lying-in and birthing clinics. Polangui's BEmONC Birthing Facility is a PhilHealth-accredited institution and offers free services to cardholders.

A new medical establishment recently opened its doors- the Our Lady of Perpetual Help Diagnostic and Dialysis Center at Barangay Centro Oriental, in front of the Polangui South Central Elementary School. Polangui and Legazpi City are the only ones in Albay who have a dialysis facility.

=== Waste disposal ===
In dealing with solid waste management, the Municipality of Polangui has adopted the usual means of dumping garbage in an open-pit dumpsite. Garbage is collected from each barangay in the poblacion every Tuesday and Friday. The municipality has four garbage trucks to ensure that the garbage is collected and disposed in the waste disposal site located at Sitio Barobo, about 4-kilometre (2.5 mi) distance from the central business district.

=== Fire protection ===
The Polangui Fire Station, Bureau of Fire Protection is located at Barangay Centro Occidental, between the Municipal Hall and the Polangui Police Station.

=== Police and law enforcement ===
The Polangui District Jail is staffed by officers of the Bureau of Jail Management and Penology (BJMP).

=== Utilities ===
==== Power ====
The Albay Electric Cooperative (ALECO) Sub-Station 2 in Barangay Centro Occidental provides electricity to the majority of the town's barangays.

==== Water ====
Water supply is managed by the Polangui Waterworks Services Administration (POWASA), inaugurated by President Gloria Macapagal Arroyo, located at Barangay Balinad. Its present service area encompasses the poblacion and some of the other barangays. The rest of the residents, most especially those in the upland and rural areas are still dependent on shallow wells, deep wells or springwater.

=== Burial grounds ===
There are 7 cemeteries in the municipality:

- Polangui Catholic Cemetery in Barangay Sugcad
- Polangui Municipal Cemetery in Barangay Sugcad
- Our Garden of Faith Memorial Park in Barangay Sugcad
- Parish Ossuary in Barangay Centro Occidental
- Parish Cemetery in Barangay Lidong
- Parish Cemetery in Barangay Matacon
- Parish Cemetery in Barangay Ponso

== Government ==
=== Elected officials ===
2025–2028 Polangui Municipal Officials
Position	Name	Party
Mayor	Jesciel Richard G. Salceda +	Lakas
Vice Mayor	Cherilie M. Sampal ‹›	Lakas
Councilors	Kristel Louise S. Pasia ‹›	Lakas
Councilors	Eugene L. Arive ‹›	NUP
Councilors	Mark Thet N. Sabando ‹›	Lakas
Councilors	Bernie S. Broncano +	Lakas
Councilors	Niño Adonis B. Rebeta +	Independent
Councilors	William H. Buendia, Sr. +	Lakas
Councilors	Rizaldy B. Recierdo +	Independent
Councilors	Kenny Edren R. Siguenza (in place of Edna R. Siguenza †) *	Lakas
Ex Officio Municipal Council Members
ABC President	Jose Niño S. Zamora II (Ubaliw)	Nonpartisan
SK Federation President	Razel Allen S. Florin (Ubaliw)	Nonpartisan

Legend
1. A + indicates that the official is elected for the first term
2. A ‹› indicates that the official is re-elected to the same position
3. A * indicates that the official is appointed to the position

2022–2025 Polangui Municipal Officials
Position	Name	Party
Mayor	Raymond Adrian E. Salceda ♯	NUP
Vice Mayor	Cherilie M. Sampal +	NUP
Councilors	Kristel Louise S. Pasia +	PROMDI
Councilors	Mark Thet N. Sabando +	NUP
Councilors	Eugene L. Arive ‹›	PROMDI
Councilors	Juan Miguel Ricardo S. Salceda +	NUP
Councilors	Noli D. Samlero ‹›	NUP
Councilors	Remgildo C. Gonzales, Jr. ‹›	PROMDI
Councilors	Jose O. Villar, Jr. ‹›	NUP
Councilors	Edna R. Siguenza +	PROMDI
Ex Officio Municipal Council Members
ABC President	Bernie S. Broncano (Gamot)	Nonpartisan
SK Federation President	Razel Allen S. Florin (Ubaliw)	Nonpartisan

Legend
1. A + indicates that the official is elected for the first term
2. A ♯ indicates that the official is re-elected to a higher position
3. A ‹› indicates that the official is re-elected to the same position

=== Past Municipal Administrators ===
Spanish regime (1750–1895)
Inclusive years	Gobernadorcillo
1750–1752	Domingo dela Sarsa
1752–1753	Diego Langcauon
1753–1754	Antonio Santa Maria
1754–1755	Diego Bananakaw
1755–1756	Pantaleon dela Vinbria
1756–1757	Laureano Pangpaguon
1757–1758	Manuel Pimentel
1758–1760	Santiago Florencio
1760–1761	Jose Eusebio
1761–1762	Narciso delos Martires
1762–1763	Mariano Josorio
1763–1764	Diego San Agustin
1764–1765	Francisco Pasion
1765–1766	Narciso delos Martires
1766–1767	Agustin Dayauon
1767–1768	Pedro Magatas
1768–1769	Ignacio Duran
1769–1770	Miguel Josorio
1770–1771	Pedro Pasion
1771–1772	Agustin Dayauon
1772–1773	Pedro Magatas
1773–1775	Santiago Damas
1775–1802	None
1802–1803	Vicente Santo Domingo
1803–1804	Agustin San Pascual
1804–1805	Antonio San Pascual
1805–1806	Bernabe S. Buenaventura
1806–1807	Tomas Eleazar
1807–1808	Damaso de Valencia
1808-1808	Agustin San Pascual
1809–1810	Fernando Almazan
1810–1811	Fernando dela Cruz
1811–1812	Agustin San Pascual
1812–1813	Francisco S. Agustin
1813–1814	Rosendo dela Cruz
1814–1815	Remegio San Agustin
1815–1816	Estanislao Perez
1816–1817	Antonio Duran
1817–1818	Nicolas Bibiano
1818–1819	Jose Duran
1819–1820	Estanislao Perez
1820–1821	Manuel San Antonio
1821–1822	Pablo delos Angeles
1822–1823	Nicolas Perez
1823–1824	Salvador dela Soledad
1824–1825	Antonio Duran
1825–1826	Margarito Buenaventura
1826–1827	Agustin San Pascual
1827–1828	Pascual Mariano
1828–1829	Jose Pasion
1829–1830	Antonio Marcelo
1830–1831	Margarito Buenaventura
1831–1832	Francisco S. Nicolas
1832–1833	Austero Tadio
1833–1834	Gregorio del Castillo
1834–1835	Manuel S. Agustin
1835–1836	Miguel San Mateo
1836–1837	Miguel Santa Isabel
1837–1838	Miguel Santa Ana
1838–1839	Martin Victoria
1839–1840	Manuel Acasio
1840–1841	Jose Torres
1841–1842	Margarito Buenaventura
1842–1843	Pedro Nolasco
1843–1844	Pascual Borromeo
1844–1845	Juan dela Cruz
1845–1846	Lorenzo Roque
1846–1847	Jose Espinas
1847–1848	Juan Eusebio
1848–1849	Felizardo Florin
1849–1850	Vicente dela Cruz
1850–1851	Camilo Mella Silva
1851–1852	Jose Sale Duran
1852–1853	Francisco Florin Padie
1853–1854	Antonio Sabido Abad
1854–1855	Vicente Perez Santanez
1855–1856	Juan Duran
1856–1857	Gregorio Imperial
1857–1858	Sacramento Salvo
1858–1859	Tranquilino Hernandez
1859–1860	Bartolome Sarte
1860–1861	Gabriel Salaber
1861–1862	Pedro Sadia
1862–1863	Pedro Sabater
1863–1865	Teodoro Salvo
1865–1866	Antonio Lluc
1866–1867	Anastacio Lluc
1867–1869	Abraham Isaac
1869–1871	Valeriano Sarte Duran
1871–1873	Pablo Santor
1873–1877	Policarpio Del Valle
1877–1879	Nicomedes Sale Duran
1879–1881	Austero Sapalicio
1881–1885	Luis Duran
1885–1887	Pascual Salegumba
1887–1890	Margarito Sadueste
1890–1892	Valentin Saba
1892–1895	Juan Sadueste

Spanish regime (1895–1901)
Inclusive years	Capitan municipal
1895–1899	Agaton Saba
1899–1901	Macario Samson

American rule (1901–1941)
Inclusive years	Municipal president
1901–1902	Clemente Sarte (Acting Chief Executive) Lorenzo Duran (1st Municipal President)
1902–1904	Procopio Arbo
1904–1906	Clemente Sarte
1906–1908	Juan Florin
1908–1911	Ruperto Carreon
1911–1913	Juan Sarte
1913–1916	Rufino Tuanqui
1916–1919	Quirico Duran
1919–1928	Juan Florin
1928–1931	Ruperto Carreon
1931–1933	Gregorio Ante
1934–1935	Ruperto Carreon
1935–1941	Crisostomo Silo

Japanese occupation (1941–1947)
Inclusive years	Municipal Mayor
1941–1944	Cipriano L. Saunar (Vice Mayor of the defunct Commonwealth government, was appointed mayor by the Japanese government)
1944–1947	Manuel A. Samson, Sr.

Post-war period (1947-date)
Inclusive years	Municipal Mayor	Municipal Vice Mayor	SK Federation President	ABC President	Remarks
1947–1960	Jesus S. Salalima				
1960–1964	Conrado A. Sabater				
1964–1968	Mariano Sapalicio				
1968–1981	Conrado A. Sabater				Conrado A. Sabater was only Presiding Officer from 1976 to 1981
1981–1986	Irineo T. Sales, Jr.				
1986–1987	Romeo Gonzales	Honesto S. Borja			
1987–1988	Honesto S. Borja				Honesto S. Borja took the place as Municipal Mayor after the death of then incumbent Mayor Romeo Gonzales.
1988–1998	Rafael A. Lo	Jesus S. Salceda, Sr.			
1998–2001	Brett Joseph B. Salalima	Norberto S. Sabaybay			
2001–2010	Jesus S. Salceda, Sr.	Brando M. Sael (2001–2004) Renato S. Borja (2004–2010)	Shayne T. Samaniego (2002–2007) Josue L. Del Villar (2007–2010)	Jose A. Zamora (2004–2007) Lito S. Ret (2007–2010)	
2010–2019	Cherilie M. Sampal	Jesus S. Salceda, Jr. (2010–2013) Raul G. Lim (2013–2016) Herbert S. Borja (2016–2019)	Patricia Anne R. Magistrado (2010–2013)	William H. Buendia, Sr. (2010–2013) Lito S. Ret (2013–2014) Raymond Adrian E. Salceda (2014–2019)	Cherilie M. Sampal was the first female municipal mayor and sixth in Albay (next to Agnes P. Dycoco of Libon, Cielo Krisel L. Luistro of Tabaco City, Linda P. Gonzales of Ligao City, Imelda C. Roces and Carmen Geraldine B. Rosal of Legazpi City)
2019–2022	Andy A. Mariscotes	Restituto S. Fernandez, Jr. (2019–2022)	John Joseph G. Villar (2018–2023)	Raymond Adrian E. Salceda (2019–2022)	
2022–2025	Raymond Adrian E. Salceda	Cherilie M. Sampal	Razel Allen S. Florin (2023–present)	Bernie S. Broncano (2022–2025)	
2025-2028	Jesciel Richard G. Salceda	Cherilie M. Sampal	Razel Allen S. Florin (since 2023	Jose Niño S. Zamora II (2025–present)	

=== Awards and recognitions ===
Year	Award	Level	Award-giving body
2021	Albay for Beautification, Clean and Green Program (AFBCGP) Most Outstanding LGU	Provincial	Provincial Government of Albay
2021	Albay for Beautification, Clean and Green Program (AFBCGP) 2nd Most Outstanding Barangay (Brgy. Maysua)	Provincial	Provincial Government of Albay
2021	Albay for Beautification, Clean and Green Program (AFBCGP) Most Outstanding Municipal Agricultural Officer (Alfredo Mariscotes Jr.)	Provincial	Provincial Government of Albay
2019	2019 Seal of Good Local Governance	National	Department of the Interior and Local Government
2019	2019 Seal of Good Financial Housekeeping	National	Department of the Interior and Local Government
2018	2018 Seal of Good Financial Housekeeping	National	Department of the Interior and Local Government
2017	2017 Seal of Good Financial Housekeeping	National	Department of the Interior and Local Government
2016	Best LGU Rabies Program Implementer	National	Department of Agriculture - Bureau of Animal Industry
2014	Agri-Pinoy Rice Achievers Award (APRAA) Hall of Fame	National	Department of Agriculture
2012	Most Outstanding Kadunong Award for Best Practices in Education	Provincial	Provincial Government of Albay

== Notable personalities ==
- Pedro R. Sabido — Former Philippine Senator, Former Philippine Ambassador to Spain and the Vatican, Former Albay 3rd District Representative (1922–1934, 1935–1939)
- Jose Ma. Clemente "Joey" S. Salceda — Albay 2nd District Representative (2016–2025), Former Albay Provincial Governor (2007–2016), Former Albay 3rd District Representative (1998–2007), Malacañang Chief of Staff (February 10, 2007 – March 29, 2007)
- Reno G. Lim — Former Albay 3rd District Representative (2007–2010)
- Dianne Elaine S. Necio — Binibining Pilipinas International 2011, Binibining Pilipinas 2010 First Runner-up, Miss Tabak 2009, Mutya ng Bicolandia
- Rodolfo "Rudy" Agapay Salalima — First Secretary of the Department of Information and Communications Technology (DICT), Former Chief Legal Counsel and Senior Advisor of Globe Telecom.

== Sister cities ==
Local

- (Philippines) General Santos - signed on May 19, 2021
