= Polangui General Comprehensive High School =

Public high school in Albay, Philippines

- Pangkalahatang Mataas na Paaralang Komprehensibo ng Polangui

Location
- Centro Occidental; Polangui, Albay; Philippines
- Coordinates: 13°17′32″N 123°29′08″E

Information
- Type: Public Secondary
- Established: 1948
- Principal: Lourdes R. Bigcas, Ed.D
- Year Levels: Grades 7 to 12
- Enrollment: approx. 4,000
- Language: English, Filipino
- Campus: 48,708 sq.m.
- Colors: White; Gray; Blue
- Nickname: PG
- Newspaper: The Courier (English); Ang Taga-Ulat (Filipino)
- Hymn: PGCHS Hymn
- March: PGCHS March

Polangui General Comprehensive High School (PGCHS) is the flagship secondary school of the municipality of Polangui in the province of Albay. It has an average population of 4,000 students. PGCHS has seven present curricula. It is located along the Buhi-Polangui Road at Purok Earth, Centro Occidental, Polangui, Albay; having a total service area of 48,708 square meters. It is 39.1 kilometers away from the Department of Education (DepEd) Albay Division Office.

PGCHS is a cluster center for all private and public schools in the municipalities of Polangui, Oas, Libon, the city of Ligao and Bato, Camarines Sur. It is also one of the 54 regional leader schools in the country. It serves as a center for training and development of materials and staff in Home Management, Information Technology, Communication Arts, Sciences, and Social Studies.

== History ==
Polangui General Comprehensive High School began as the Albay High School of Polangui (AHSP). It was one of four high schools in the province of Albay when it opened in 1948. The others were Albay High School–Guinobatan (now Marcial O. Rañola Memorial School), Albay High School (now Bicol University College of Education Integrated Laboratory School), and Albay High School–Tabaco (now Tabaco National High School). The initial enrollment was 234 students, with nine teachers, a clerk, and a janitor. Mr. Sisenando Reantaso was the school's first principal.

AHSP held classes in the municipal building and a rented house for about two years. Following that, it purchased property in Barangay Centro Occidental, on the Buhi-Polangui provincial road leading to Barangay Lidong. The site was a 66,607 square meter lot purchased from Mr. Eleuterio Basquiez with funds raised by the PTA through municipal council representation in accordance with Resolution No. 76 passed on August 14, 1953. On September 3, 1953, the Provincial Government validated the sale through Resolution No. 141.

Under the authority of Resolution No. 93 approved November 13, 1956 by the municipal council of Polangui, duly certified and concurred with by the Division Superintendent of Schools, Pastor Escalante, on February 12, 1959, 17,899 square meters (Lot 2) provided campus for the School for Philippine Craftsmen (now Bicol University Polangui Campus).

Mrs. Aurora R. Encisa was the principal from 1963 to 1980. On June 18, 1964, President Diosdado P. Macapagal signed Republic Act 3993 into law, converting AHSP into Polangui General Comprehensive High School (PGCHS), a national secondary school. The "new" school was modeled after comprehensive high schools in Detroit, Michigan, United States. Mrs. Encisa was also in charge when PGCHS held its first extension classes in Ponso, Polangui in 1965.

Oas opened extension classes during the 1972–1973 school year. The latter was phased out in 1984 to make way for the establishment of the Oas Polytechnic School. In 1978–1979, an extension school was established in Balogo. Another extension school was established in La Medalla, Polangui, in 1991.

PGCHS has nearly 4,500 students, 142 regular teachers and employees, two librarians, a school nurse, a five-man security unit, a five-man janitorial and messengerial team, and an accounting, clerical, and property office with six employees, one driver, contractual and casuals.

Past School Administrators
Sisenando Reantaso, 1948–1953
Victor Pineda, 1953–1963
Aurora R. Encisa, 1963–1981
Vicente Batbat (OIC), 1981–1981
Felicitas Ll. Olondriz, 1982–1996
Wilfredo E. Pura, 1996–2004
Coreta O. Marollano, 2004–2005
Osias S. Monforte, 2005–2010
Sancita B. Peñarubia (OIC), 2010–2015
Emma R. Morasa, 2015–2017
Alicia R. Lim, 2017–2019
Lourdes R. Bigcas, 2019–2020
Alicia R. Lim, 2020–2023
Lourdes R. Bigcas, 2023-present

== Objectives ==
As embodied in the PGCHS Educational Development Plan, the PGCHS works to continue promoting the objectives of elementary education, discover and enhance the interests of the students, and to utilize not only the formal methods but also the non-formal methods of delivery of educational services.

== Present curricula ==
The school's present curriculum is based on the K to 12 Basic Education Curriculum (K-12 BEC). The implementation of the program is pursuant to Republic Act (RA) 10533 or the Enhanced Basic Education Act of 2013 signed by President Benigno Aquino III on May 15, 2013.

The overall design of Grades 1 to 12 curriculum follows the spiral approach across subjects by building on the same concepts. Teachers are expected to use the spiral/progression approach in teaching competencies. As early as elementary, students learn in areas such as Biology, Geometry, Earth Science, Chemistry, and Algebra.

== Homeroom sections ==
There are 77 homerooms as of School Year 2013–2014.^{3}

== Programs and services ==
Guidance services

Formal guidance counseling services as well as informal guidance counseling are provided to the students through frequent contacts.

Prefect of discipline

PGCHS' prefect of discipline recommends penalties to the principal.

Library services

Free library are available on the school.

Computer laboratory

The school has a computer laboratory and E-Library.

Health services

The school provides first aid in emergency cases.

Food services

The school has three canteens.

Science laboratory

The school has a science laboratory

TLE laboratories

These laboratories provide services to the students in TLE classes in the four curricular areas:

- Home Economics
- Agriculture
- Industrial Arts
- Entrepreneurship

Religious services

They conduct prayer sessions, class formation, Eucharistic celebration, meditations and readings of magazine, Bible and pamphlets in the Meditation Garden.

== Notable events hosted ==
- 2006 Regional Secondary Schools Press Conference (RSSPC)
- 9th Division Youth Congress in August 2007
- 2008 Cluster Secondary Schools Press Conference (CSSPC)
- 2008 Division Secondary Schools Press Conference (DSSPC)
- 2009 Division STEP Skills Development and Competition
- 2011 Division Science Competitions
- 2012 Regional Secondary Schools Press Conference (RSSPC)

== AHSP-PGCHS Annual Alumni Grand Homecoming ==
The annual tradition of PGCHS Alumni Homecoming was initiated was Batch 1976 in 2006. Since then, every Black Saturday, the gathering is being held where former students of the different batches return to PGCHS to reminisce old-time memories and to reunite with former batchmates and mentors. Election of the AHSP-PGCHS Alumni Association is conducted every 2 years.

=== Batch donations and initiatives ===
The Grand Annual Homecoming also provides a perfect time for the alumni to return the favor to their alma mater, through fundraising activities for the rehabilitation and further development of the campus. Several batches have already donated/provided for the construction of some school facilities.

Project	Donor	Remarks
PGCHS Chapel		
PGCHS Gate 1	PGCHS Batch 1973	Completed March 2024
Water Tank	PGCHS Batch 1982	
AHSP-PGCHS Alumni Building	PGCHS Bacth 1976	Completed in 2008
PGCHS Gate 2	PGCHS Batch 1980	Completed in 2010
Botanical Garden and Gazebo	PGCHS Batch 1984	Completed in 2011
Centralized Intercom with Amplifier and Repair of School Siren	PGCHS Batch 1988	Completed in 2018
Hand Washing Facility and CR Repair	AHSP-PGCHS Alumni Association	Brigada Eskwela 2018 project; completed in May 2018
Comfort Rooms (bedside the Stage)	PGCHS Batch 1972	Completed in 2019
New Comfort Room and Hand Washing Facility	AHSP-PGCHS Alumni Association	Proceeds of the pantomina dance during the Homecoming Night; completed in June 2019

== Notable alumni ==
- Reno G. Lim (Batch 1976)–Former Congressman, 3rd District of Albay (2007–2010)
- Dianne Elaine S. Necio (Batch 2007)–Binibining Pilipinas International 2011, Binibining Pilipinas 2010 First Runner-up, Miss Tabak 2009, Mutya ng Bicolandia

== Notes ==
1. Changed to Edukasyon sa Pagpapakatao (ESP) in the K-12 BEC.
2. Changed to Environmental Science in the K-12 BEC.
3. The K to 12 Basic Education Curriculum (K-12 BEC) and the Alternative Learning System (ALS) are excluded in the sectioning process.
4. Dissolved in 2006 due to the low performance of the incoming batch in the National Achievement Test (NAT). Reinstated in 2009 when the incoming batch achieved high scores in NAT.
5. Was also dissolved in 2006 consequent to the exclusion of III-Charles. Re-included in 2010.
6. Dissolved in 2011.
