= Camilo Pérez =

Camilo Pérez may refer to:

- Camilo Pérez (boxer) (born 1990), Puerto Rican boxer
- Camilo Pérez (footballer) (born 1985), Colombian footballer
- Camilo Pérez López Moreira (born 1969), Paraguayan sports organiser.
