= Gustavo Ramírez =

Gustavo Ramírez may refer to:

- Gustavo Ramírez (wrestler) (born 1941), Guatemalan wrestler
- Gustavo Ramírez Villarreal (born 1964), Mexican politician
- Gustavo Ramírez (footballer, born 1984), Paraguayan football forward
- Gustavo Ramírez (footballer, born 1990), Paraguayan football forward
