= George Wiley Center =

American non-profit organization

The George Wiley Center is an American non-governmental, non-profit organization founded in 1981. Named after chemist and civil rights activist George Wiley, the organization was founded by Henry Shelton, a social activist, and is based in Pawtucket, Rhode Island. Its stated mission is "local community organizing" to create "social and economic justice through changes in public policy".

The organization advocates on behalf of low-income residents of Rhode Island, primarily focusing on issues regarding utilities such as electricity and natural gas. In December 2013, the George Wiley Center organized a successful petition for the Rhode Island Public Utilities Commission to postpone a vote and hold further hearings on proposed changes to residential electricity and natural gas service regulations, which would have narrowed eligibility for "protected status" and shortened the Winter Moratorium, the period when utility customers are protected from having their utilities shut off. In December 2014, representatives from the organization were among the speakers questioning electricity rate increases at a hearing at the Rhode Island Public Utilities Commission's offices.

The Henry Shelton Act, named after its primary advocate and George Wiley Center founder Henry Shelton, was signed into law in July 2011. It went into effect on October 15, 2011. The law creates an "arrearage forgiveness program" for low-income households eligible for the federal Low Income Home Energy Assistance Program (LIHEAP) that have had or are scheduled to have their utilities shut off.

The organization has a staff of two people, in addition to a body of volunteers and interns. The Wiley Center's coordinator role was filled by Camilo Viveiros in 2016. He joined as an organizer in 2012 and has over 25 years of community organizing experience. On June 8, 2019, members of the George Wiley Center announced the formation of a new board reflective of the community. The new board looks forward to continued grassroots organizing in support of social, economic, and racial justice.
