= 4th federal electoral district of Nuevo León =

Federal electoral district of Mexico

Nuevo León's 4th
- Electoral district of the Chamber of Deputies of Mexico

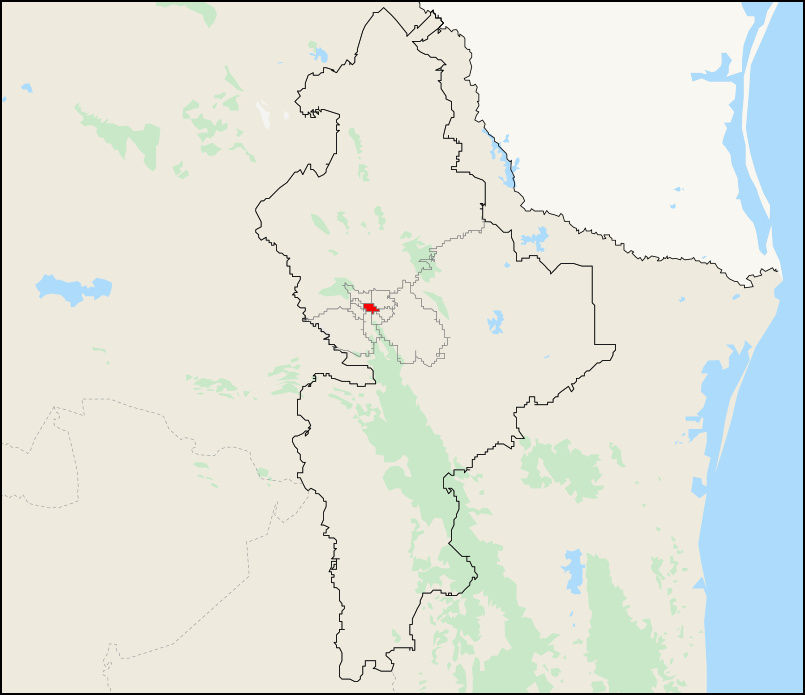

Incumbent
- Member: Lilia Olivares Castañeda
- Party: ▌National Action Party
- Congress: 66th (2024–2027)

District
- State: Nuevo León
- Head town: San Nicolás de los Garza
- Coordinates: 25°45′N 100°17′W
- Covers: San Nicolás de los Garza, General Escobedo (part)
- PR region: Second
- Precincts: 249
- Population: 423,298 (2020 census)

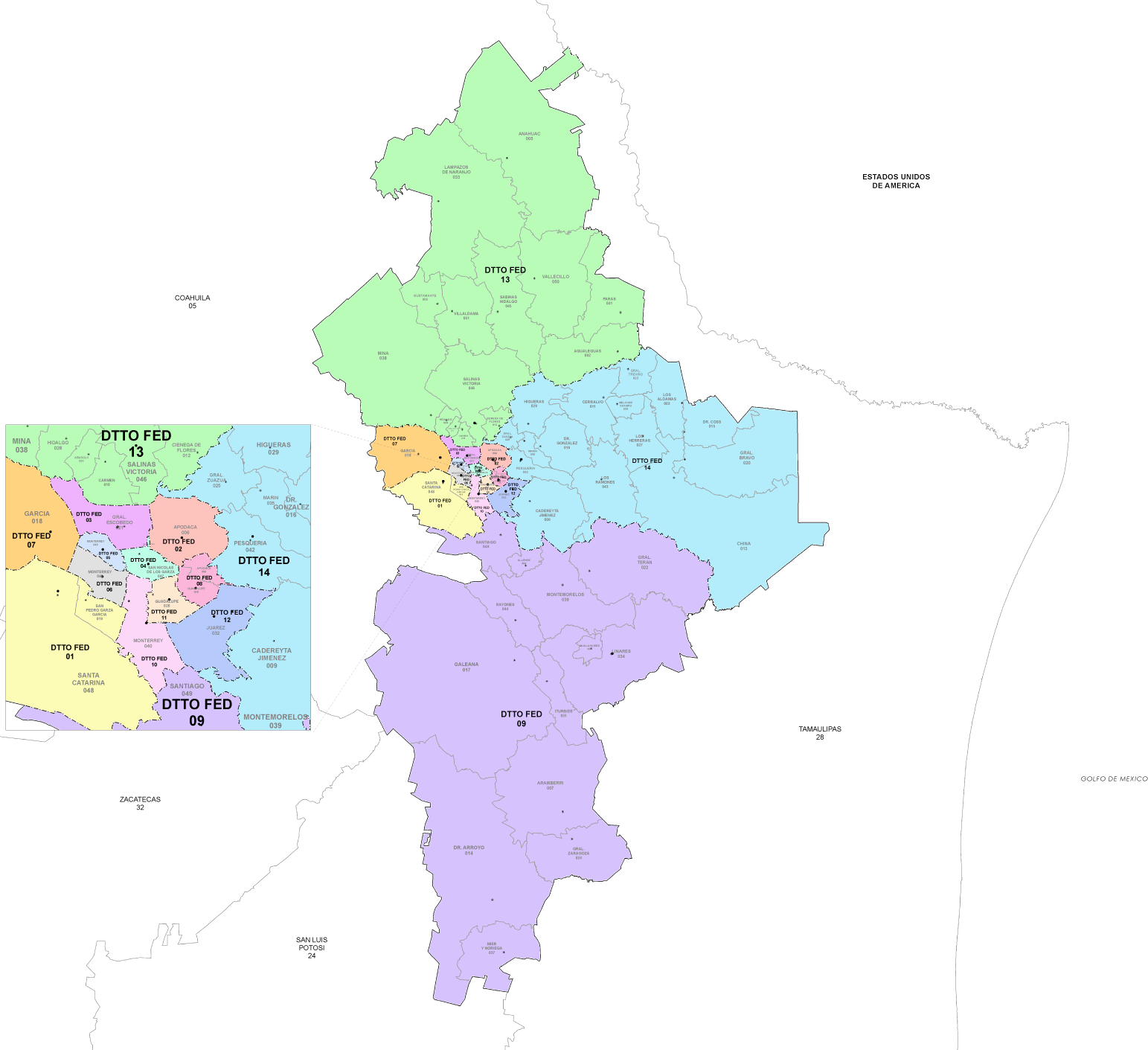
Nuevo León under the 2023 districting plan

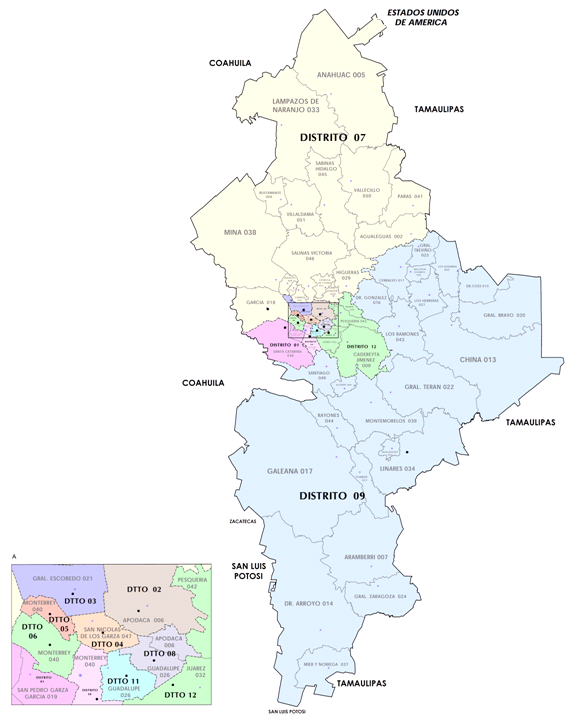
Nuevo León's districts in 2017–2022

The 4th federal electoral district of Nuevo León (Spanish: Distrito electoral federal 04 de Nuevo León) is one of the 300 electoral districts into which Mexico is divided for elections to the federal Chamber of Deputies and one of 14 such districts in the state of Nuevo León.

It elects one deputy to the lower house of Congress for each three-year legislative session by means of the first-past-the-post system. Votes cast in the district also count towards the calculation of proportional representation ("plurinominal") deputies elected from the second region.

The current member for the district, elected in the 2024 general election, is Lilia Olivares Castañeda of the National Action Party (PAN).

== District territory ==
Under the 2023 districting plan adopted by the National Electoral Institute (INE), which is to be used for the 2024, 2027 and 2030 federal elections, Nuevo León's congressional seat allocation rose from 12 to 14. The fourth district is in the centre of the Monterrey metropolitan area and covers two of the state's municipalities:

- The whole of San Nicolás de los Garza – 241 electoral precincts (secciones electorales) – and 8 precincts in General Escobedo. (Note: The remainder of General Escobedo is assigned to the 3rd district.)

The district's head town (cabecera distrital), where results from individual polling stations are gathered together and tallied, is the city of San Nicolás de los Garza.The district reported a population of 423,298 in the 2020 census.

== Previous districting schemes ==
Evolution of electoral district numbers
	1974	1978	1996	2005	2017	2023
Nuevo León	7	11	11	12	12	14
Chamber of Deputies	196	300				

2017–2022

Between 2017 and 2022, the district comprised the whole of San Nicolás de los Garza (238 precincts).

2005–2017

Under the 2005 districting plan, the district covered 164 precincts in the south-east of San Nicolás de los Garza. (The remainder of the municipality was assigned to the 3rd district.)

1996–2005

From 1996 to 2005, the district covered the southern portion of San Nicolás (151 precincts).

1978–1996

The districting scheme in force from 1978 to 1996 was the result of the 1977 electoral reforms, which increased the number of single-member seats in the Chamber of Deputies from 196 to 300. Under that plan, Nuevo León's seat allocation rose from 7 to 11. The 4th district was located in the Monterrey metropolitan area and covered a portion of the city of Guadalupe.

== Deputies returned to Congress ==
(Mexico) National parties
- Current
- PAN
- PRI
- PT
- PVEM
- MC
- Morena
- PAZ
- Somos
- Defunct or local only
- PLM
- PNR
- PRM
- PNM
- PP
- PPS
- PARM
- PFCRN
- CON
- PANAL
- PSD
- PES
- PES
- PRD

Nuevo León's 4th district
Election	Deputy	Party	Term	Legislature
1916	Ramón Gámez		1916–1917	Constituent Congress of Querétaro
...
1979	Filiberto Villarreal Ayala	Institutional Revolutionary Party	1979–1982	51st Congress
1982	Homero Ayala Torres	Institutional Revolutionary Party	1982–1985	52nd Congress
1985	Isaías Vázquez Mendoza	Institutional Revolutionary Party	1985–1988	53rd Congress
1988	Agustín Serna Servín	Institutional Revolutionary Party	1988–1991	54th Congress
1991	Juan Morales Salinas	Institutional Revolutionary Party	1991–1994	55th Congress
1994	Gerardo Macario Rodríguez Rivera	National Action Party (Mexico)	1994–1997	56th Congress
1997	Pablo Gutiérrez Jiménez	National Action Party (Mexico)	1997–2000	57th Congress
2000	Manuel Braulio Martínez Ramírez	National Action Party (Mexico)	2000–2003	58th Congress
2003	Norma Patricia Saucedo Moreno	National Action Party (Mexico)	2003–2006	59th Congress
2006	Gustavo Ramírez Villarreal	National Action Party (Mexico)	2006–2009	60th Congress
2009	Camilo Ramírez Puente	National Action Party (Mexico)	2009–2012	61st Congress
2012	Víctor Oswaldo Fuentes Solís (Note: Fuentes Solís resigned his seat on 12 February 2015 and was replaced for the remainder of his term by his alternate, Flores Suárez.); Ricardo Flores Suárez	National Action Party (Mexico)	2012–2015; 2015	62nd Congress
2015	Carlos Alberto de la Fuente Flores	National Action Party (Mexico)	2015–2018	63rd Congress
2018	Ricardo Flores Suárez	National Action Party (Mexico)	2018–2021	64th Congress
2021	Pedro Salgado Almaguer	National Action Party (Mexico)	2021–2024	65th Congress
2024	Amparo Lilia Olivares Castañeda	National Action Party (Mexico)	2024–2027	66th Congress

== Presidential elections ==
Nuevo León's 4th district
Election	District won by	Party or coalition	%
2018	Ricardo Anaya Cortés	Por México al Frente	40.9174
2024	Bertha Xóchitl Gálvez Ruiz	Fuerza y Corazón por México	44.6301
