= Norma Patricia Saucedo =

Mexican politician

- Born: 9 February 1972 (age 54); Monterrey, Nuevo León, Mexico
- Occupation: Politician
- Political party: PAN

Norma Patricia Saucedo Moreno (born 9 February 1972) is a Mexican politician affiliated with the National Action Party (PAN). In the 2003 mid-terms she was elected to the Chamber of Deputies to represent Nuevo León's 4th district during the 59th session of Congress.
