= Gustavo Ramírez Villarreal =

Mexican politician

- Born: 18 July 1964 (age 61); Nuevo León, Mexico
- Occupation: Politician
- Political party: PAN

Gustavo Ramírez Villarreal (born 18 July 1964) is a Mexican politician affiliated with the National Action Party (PAN). In the 2006 general election he was elected to the Chamber of Deputies to represent Nuevo León's 4th district during the 60th session of Congress.
