= Camilo (footballer, born 22 March 1986) =

Brazilian footballer

Personal information
- Full name: Camilo de Sousa Vieira
- Date of birth: March 22, 1986 (age 40)
- Place of birth: Ceres-GO, Brazil
- Height: 1.85 m (6 ft 1 in)
- Position: Goalkeeper

Team information
- Current team: sem clube

Youth career
- 2005: Brazlândia-DF

Senior career*
Years	Team	Apps	(Gls)
2006	Assisense-SP		
2007	Sport		
2007	Barueri		
2020-	Sousa		
- * Club domestic league appearances and goals

Camilo de Sousa Vieira (born March 22, 1986, in Ceres), or simply Camilo, is a Brazilian football goalkeeper, who plays for Sousa

== Contract ==
- May 6, 2009, to December 15, 2009
