= Camilo Viveiros =

American political activist

Camilo Viveiros is an American political activist.

== Early life ==
Camilo Vivieros was born and raised in Fall River, Massachusetts. His parents are working-class Portuguese immigrants. In 2009, Viveriros received a B.A. Sociology from University of Massachusetts Dartmouth.

== Organizing career ==
Viveiros is a community organizer based in the Rhode Island and Massachusetts area with at least 35 years of experience. Since 2016, he has worked as the Coordinator of the George Wiley Center in Pawtucket, Rhode Island. Related to this position are his activities advocating for utility and tenant justice. He is also a board member of the Somerville, Massachusetts based non-profit organization RESIST.

Viveiros is the Founder and Lead Trainer of independent organization, called Organizing2Activism. The organization conducts training for community organizers, with an emphasis on moving from "tactics-focused activism" to a "grassroots organizing" approach. Training and activities began in 2004. He is also the cofounder of Popular Praxis, which is also an active community organizing organization.

Viveiros is a staff member for the UMass Dartmouth Labor Education Center.

== Arrest ==
On August 1, 2000, police raided a building that Viveiros, along with many others, were using to prepare for demonstrations around the 2000 Republican National Convention. He was subsequently charged with aggravated assault of Police Commissioner John Timoney and threatened with jail time. Two others were also charged with assaulting police. In addition to assault, all three men were charged with multiple felonies and misdemeanors. During the convention, at least 400 people were arrested in what Viveiros' defense committee called the "largest single violation of civil rights since the Vietnam War." Viveiros was one of the few arrestees actively prosecuted, although no evidence could be found. He was acquitted. For nearly all those involved, their charges were dropped or they were acquitted. In an August 17 statement, Viveiros stated that "Basically the commissioner is making a symbol of me" and urged supporters "Don't let them criminalize protest!"

== Philosophy ==
The political philosophy of Viverios centers around organizing the unorganized. In February 2010, during a speech delivered in Boston, he said "Our present economic predicament resulted from years of oppression, fear, and division. Yet now is a moment where, if we organize, we can expand our movements in order to include larger segments of unemployed workers and more community members who are frustrated at corporate policies and government inaction." Viverios also emphasizes that activists can transform into organizers in order to be far more effective. The Activism2Organizing website, which Viveiros operates, states "We need to define the difference between activist approaches and organizing strategies to avoid paternalistic recruitment efforts and make sure that our organizing efforts go beyond rhetoric and events- or tactics-focused activism."
