= Camilo Jacob =

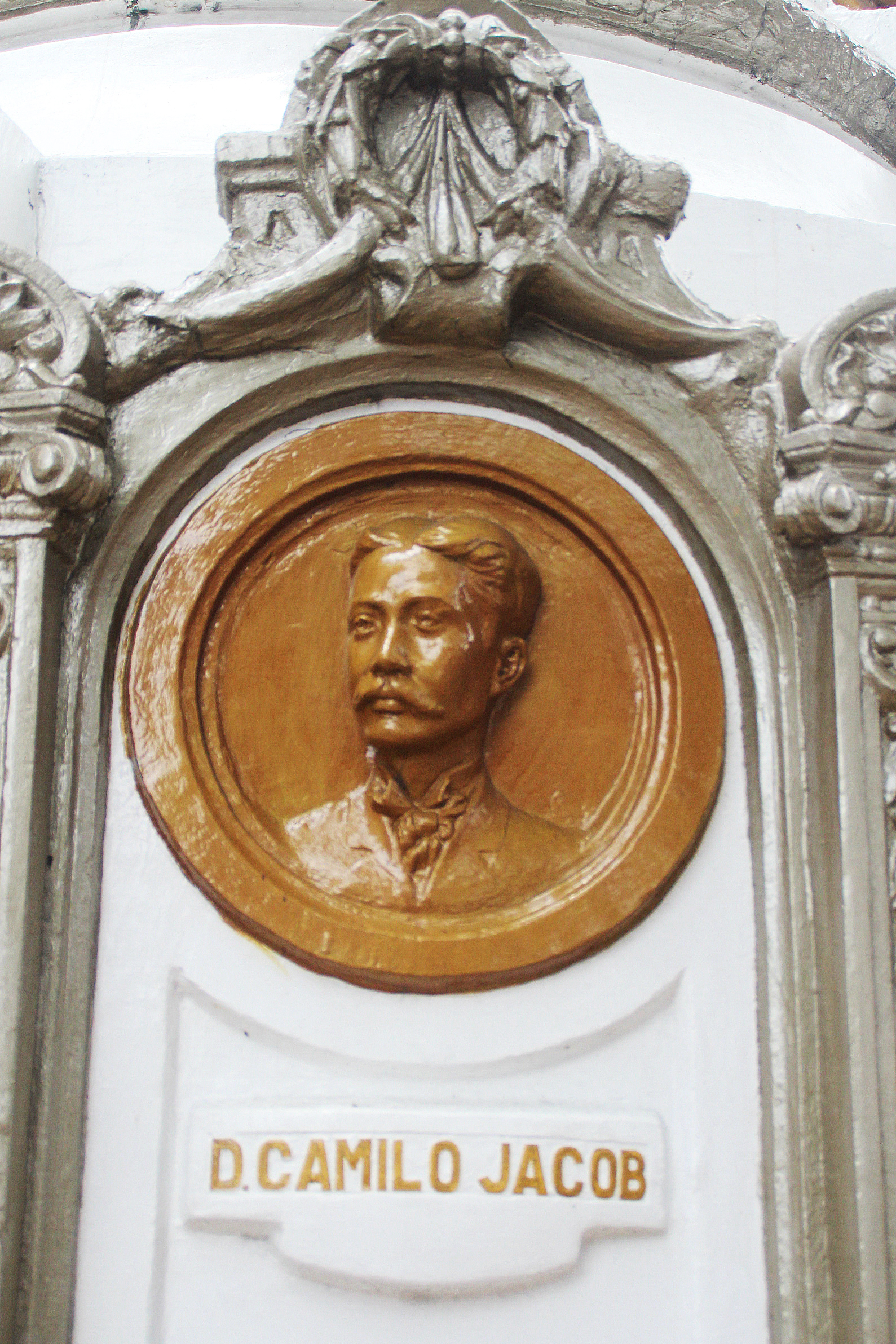
Don Camilo Jacob at Quince Martires Monument

Camilo Jacob y Soledad (1856 - January 4, 1897) was a Bicolano hero, martyr and revolutionary. He was also known as one of the 11 among the Fifteen Martyrs of Bicol who were executed in Bagumbayan (Luneta), now Rizal Park, by Spanish authorities at the end of 19th century during the Philippine revolution.

== Life ==
Being a native, he grew up and was raised in Polangui, in the province of Albay. At the time he was implicated, he was already pursuing a career as a successful professional, and commercial photographer, thereby maintaining his photographic studio at Nueva Caceres, now Naga City. Since at that time, photography was considered as novelty and as one of the luxuries, it made him well known amongst clients who were from families of government officials and businessmen who wanted their portraits taken.

== Involvement in the Philippine Revolution ==
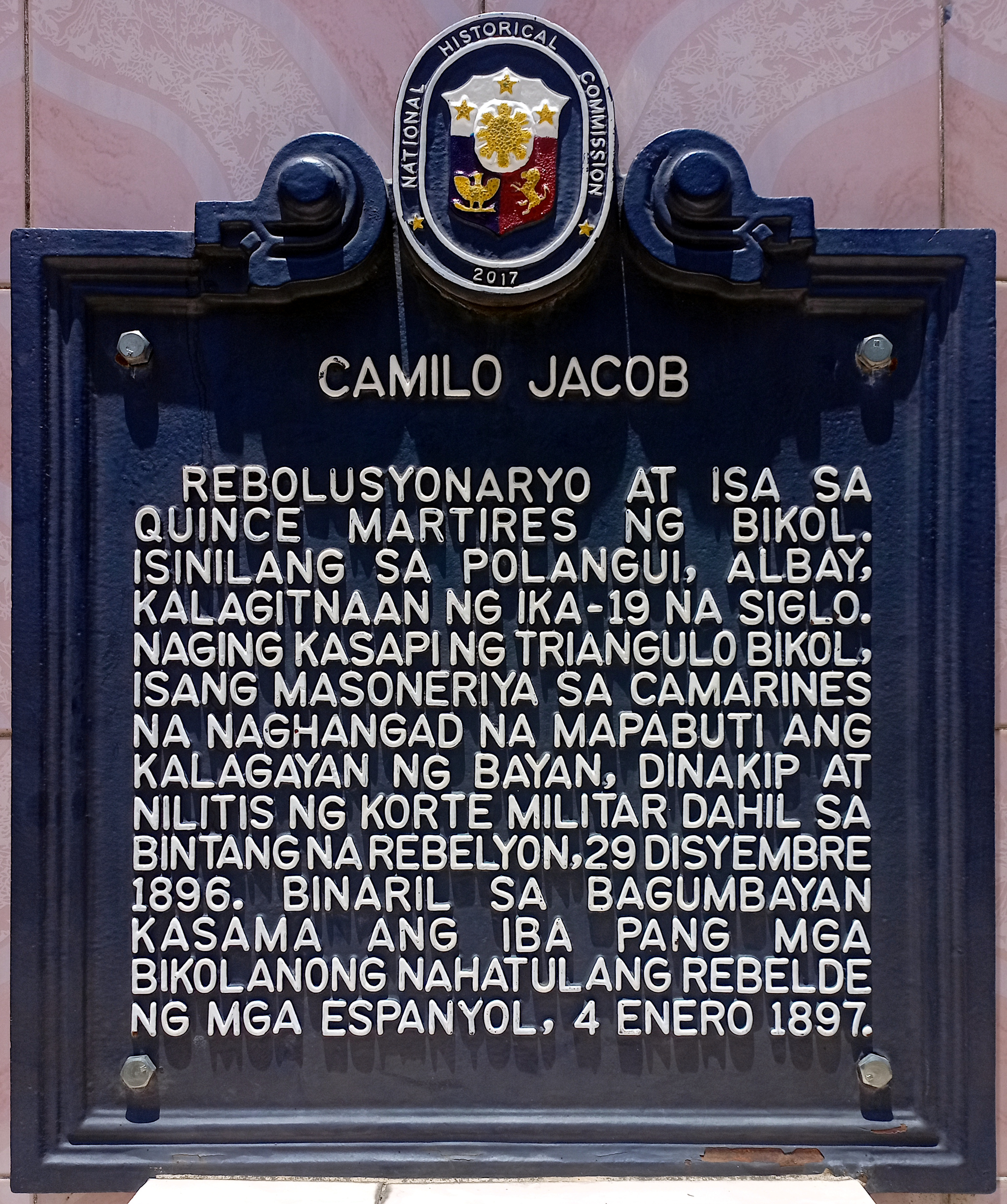
National historical marker installed at the Polangui municipal hall in 2017

The onset of Philippine revolution on the last part of 1896 raised concerns among the Spanish authorities of its possible outbreak in the Bicol region. Thus, those who were liberal-minded were bitterly persecuted on grounds of not just holding separatist ideologies but on advocating the overthrowing of Spain's authority in the Philippines. These persecutions involved businessmen and professionals, mostly adherents to Masonry and members of the clergy. Among the arrested was Vicente Lukban, head of Masonic chapter, Triangulo Bikol, belonging to the Masonic lodge, La Luz Oriente, which, upon interrogation, implicated Jacob as one of the active member and supporter of the Katipunan.

== Arrest, trials and execution ==
On September 19, 1896, he, along with many others accused with rebellion and sedition, he was arrested. Upon arrest, each of them were hung by their thumbs of fingers and beaten up, starved and insulted. Then they were sent and brought to Manila, for trial by the Provincial Junta of Camarines Sur headed by then Governor Julian Ocampo, on board steamer Isarog and imprisoned in Bilibid only to be tortured again. Even so, they were tortured and all, Jacob remained an exemplary as "the prisoner who suffered the most torture with great fortitude". After they were sentenced on accusations against them, on January 4, 1897, 5 days after Jose Rizal's execution, Jacob, along with 10 others were marched to the site and was executed with firing squad, as their families stood watch amongst the crowd. Then the Spanish authorities immediately ordered the families to bury them on that day to prevent outpouring sympathizers.

== Commemoration ==
On March 7, 2017, the National Historical Commission of the Philippines (NHCP) unveiled the Camilo Jacob Historical marker in Polangui, Albay and turned it over to the local government of Polangui.
