= Student Technologists and Entrepreneurs of the Philippines =

The Student Technologists and Entrepreneurs of the Philippines (STEP) is an organization formed by the consolidation of the former Future Farmers of the Philippines (FFP), Future Homemakers of the Philippines (FHP) and Future Agricultural Homemakers of the Philippines (FAHP) organizations. Its membership is composed mainly of high school students and out-of-school-youth (OSY).

== History ==
During one of the conferences and trainings conducted for the implementation of the Youth Entrepreneurship and Cooperativism in Schools (YECS) Program, the Regional TEPP Supervisors and the Center for Students and Co-curricular Affairs (CSCA), headed by Executive Director Joey G. Pelaez, reviewed the different existing organizations in the then Technology and Home Economics (THE), such as the Future Farmers of the Philippines (FFP), Future Homemakers of the Philippines (FHP) and the Future Agricultural Homemakers of the Philippines (FAHP), to assess the viability of their revival and revitalization. This was in pursuance of DECS Order No. 54, s. 2000 entitled "Revitalizing the FHP, FFP, and FAHP Organizations", dated 1 September 2000 and signed by Secretary Andrew Gonzalez, FSC, and DECS Memorandum No. 65, s. 2001 entitled "Significant Matters for the FFP, FAHP and FHP," dated 8 February 2001 and signed by Undersecretary Ramon C. Bacani. The main consideration for the revival and revitalization was to recognize the value and significance of the various skills and activities of the organizations concerned in enhancing and complementing the learning competencies of the work education and skills training program of the curriculum, more than recognizing the continued existence of the chapter organizations in the school, division and regional levels, although the same national organizations are wanting in legal existence due to its continued non‑operation for years in the national level for which the Securities and Exchange Commission (SEC) issued suspension orders of their respective Certificate of Registration, dated 27 October 1988 and 14 August 1990 pursuant to PD 902‑A as amended.

However, the proponents of the project decided not to revive the organizations. Instead, they opted to establish a new national organization to give a new lease and a clean slate on the initiatives being undertaken to strengthen the then THE subject area, which, until then, did not have a significant venue for showcasing students' skills and talents, and an organization that will propel and support its initiatives. Thus, pursuant to DECS Order No. 44, s. 2001, dated 14 August 2001 and signed by Undersecretary Ramon C. Bacani, the Student Technologists and Entrepreneurs of the Philippines (STEP) was created under the auspices of the Center for Students and Co‑Curricular Affairs of the Department of Education, unifying the FFP, FHP, FAHP and all other existing THE organizations, except the Youth Entrepreneurship and Cooperativism in Schools (YECS), into just one organization. All high schools, public and private, as well as schools with secondary program under the State Universities and Colleges (SUCs) and the Technical Education and Skills Development Authority (TESDA) were mandated to establish the STEP as a co‑curricular organization to enhance life‑long skills and support the learning competencies of the technical education and skills training program in the curriculum.

The first division and regional skills competitions and conferences were conducted immediately in the same school year following the issuance of the Department Order. Under the leadership of Secretary Edilberto de Jesus in the Department of Education and the support of Dr. Fe A. Hidalgo, Undersecretary for Programs and Projects, the First STEP National Skills Competition and Conference on January 29 to February 1, 2003 at the DepEd Ecotech Center, Cebu City, with DepEd Region VII, in cooperation with the DepEd Division of Cebu City and Abellana National School, as host was conducted in compliance with DepEd Memorandum No. 288, s. 2002 dated 13 December 2002.

== National Skills Development and Competitions ==
The 1st National Skills Conference and Competitions (as it was called then) was first held in Cebu City. The recently concluded 9th National Skills Development and Competitions were held in Baguio.

=== Hosts of the NSCC/NSDC ===
- 1st STEP-NSCC - Cebu City, Central Visayas
- 2nd STEP-NSCC - Ilo-Ilo City
- 3rd STEP-NSDC - Naga, Bicol Region
- 4th STEP-NSDC - General Santos, Soccsksargen
- 5th STEP-NSDC - Baguio, Cordillera Administrative Region
- 6th STEP-NSDC - Davao City, Davao Region
- 7th STEP-NSDC - Baguio, Cordillera Administrative Region
- 8th STEP-NSDC - Naga, Bicol Region
- 9th STEP-NSDC - Baguio, Cordillera Administrative Region
