= Camilo Minero =

Salvadoran artist

Camilo Minero Nochez (11 November 1917 – 6 May 2005) was Salvadoran painter, muralist, and an engraver. As a painter, he worked with oil painting, prints, serigraphs, watercolours, and murals. The color yellow is prevalent in his work, and his paintings often depicted the everyday lives of Latin Americans.

== Early life and education ==
Camilo Minero Nochez was born 11 November 1917 in Zacatecoluca, El Salvador to Camilo Minero, the owner of a funeral home, and Josefina Mochez de Minero, a fabric maker.

Minero started making art at an early age and studied drawing and painting with Marcelino Carballo. He later studied at the National School of Graphic Arts in El Salvador. Through a scholarship granted by the Salvadoran state, he obtained the opportunity to study in Mexico with great muralists such as Diego Rivera and David Alfaro Siqueiros. In Mexico he studied at the Instituto Politécnico Nacional and the Factory of Popular Graph. One of the murals of the building of the rectory at the University of El Salvador was painted by him.

== Career ==
Camilo Minero was known by the nickname "El pintor del pueblo" (English: the painter of the people), due to his leftist political ideals. However, his affiliation with the Farabundo Marti National Liberation Front ultimately led to his imprisonment and exile. While in exile, he traveled to Mexico and Nicaragua, teaching painting and engraving classes at the Polytechnic University of Nicaragua. He returned to El Salvador after the Chapultepec Peace Accords were signed in 1992.

In 1996, he was awarded the National Prize of Culture by the government of El Salvador.

He died from a heart attack in Sal Salvador on 6 May 2005.
