= Camilo Ramírez Puente =

Mexican politician (born 1959)

- Born: 17 July 1959 (age 66); San Luis Potosí, Mexico
- Occupation: Politician
- Political party: PAN

Camilo Ramírez Puente (born 17 July 1959) is a Mexican politician from the National Action Party (PAN). In the 2009 mid-terms he was elected to the Chamber of Deputies to represent Nuevo León's 4th district during the 61st session of Congress.
