= Camilo Ceballos =

Colombian footballer (born 1984)

Personal information
- Full name: Camilo Andrés Ceballos Zapata
- Date of birth: July 15, 1984 (age 42)
- Place of birth: Apartadó, Antioquia, Colombia
- Height: 1.83 m (6 ft 0 in)
- Position: Defender

Senior career*
Years	Team	Apps	(Gls)
2006–2008	Envigado	78	(4)
2009	Junior	36	(1)
2010–2012	Deportivo Cali	42	(1)
2013	Once Caldas	11	(0)
2014	Águilas Doradas	21	(4)
2015–2016	Deportivo Pasto	49	(1)
2017	Rionegro Águilas	2	(0)
2018	Real Cartagena	33	(1)
2019	Bogotá	6	(0)
- * Club domestic league appearances and goals

Camilo Andrés Ceballos Zapata (born 15 July 1984) is a retired Colombian football defender.
