= Camilo Soares Machado =

Paraguayan politician

Camilo Soares Machado has served as the Paraguayan Minister of Emergency Preparedness under President Fernando Lugo since 2008.

== Biography ==
At age 15, he founded the charity Casa de la Juventud (Youth House). In May 2006, he founded a socialist political party called Partido del Movimiento al Socialismo, and in November 2006 he became a councillor for Asunción. In 2008, he was appointed as Minister of Emergency Preparedness until May 28, 2010, when President Lugo issued decree 4418 to grant him unpaid leave, because he was being accused of embezzlement and counterfeit of invoices, causing damage for 4,290 million of guaraní. The case is still open and pending.
