= Camilo Coba =

Ecuadorian filmmaker and photographer

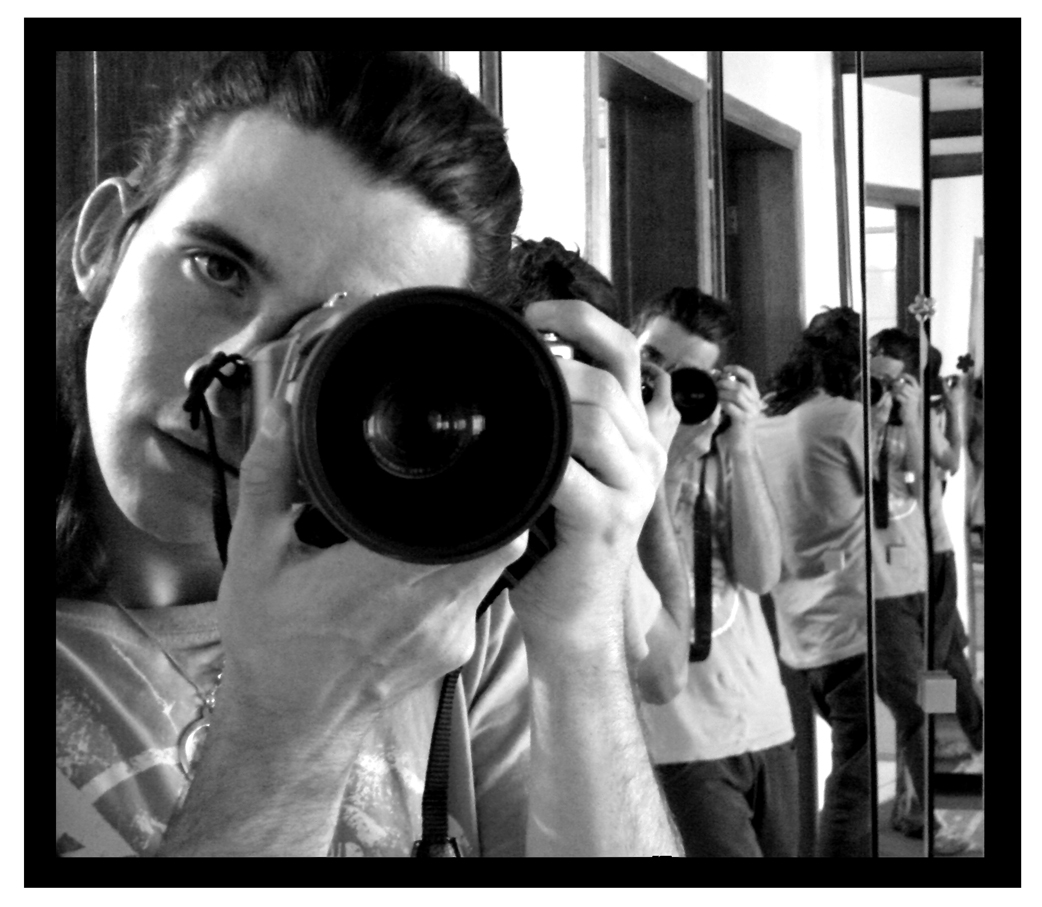
- Born: Quito, Ecuador
- Occupation: Film director

Camilo Coba is a filmmaker and photographer from Ecuador.

== Biography ==
Camilo Coba was born in Quito, Ecuador, on 7 September 1986. He studied film direction in Buenos Aires Argentina, under Argentine director Manuel Antín, where he won several awards for his individual and group works. He is currently attending the Movie and Video career programme at the Universidad San Francisco de Quito. His first film, El Silencio No Existe (The Silence Does Not Exist), received recognition from the Washington, DC International Film Festival.

He has participated in numerous short film projects in Argentina and Ecuador, mainly as director of photography and cinematographer. He represented Ecuador in the Dwight School I.B. Film Festival at the age of 17 years and was awarded the Special Jury Prize. This was the only short film selected from Latin America.

== Partial filmography ==
=== Buenos Aires, Argentina ===
Year	Film	Capacity	Notes
2005	No Somos Nada	Photographer	8 minutes
2005	Ausente – Presente	Photographer, director, editor	8 minutes
2005	Decadencia	Photographer, director	8 minutes
2005	Sub–Zero	Photographer	8 minutes
2005	Decline	Photographer, director	8 minutes
2005	Un Colchón y una pistola	Editor	8 minutes

=== Quito, Ecuador ===
Year	Film	Capacity	Length
2005	Mi Anillo	Photographer, director	8 minutes
2006	El Silencio No Existe	Photographer, director	Feature length
2007	Guardia – Vigilante	Photographer, director	12 minutes
2007	Drag Nights	Photographer, director	7 minutes
2007	Mary	Photographer, director	8 minutes
In production	Sin Nombre	Photographer, director	To be determined
In production	Quito – Toki	Photographer, director, editor	20 minutes

== Festivals and awards ==
- Festival I.B. de The Dwight School, New York 2004: Special Prize of the Jury for Popular quitumbe
- Programa Arte y Parte de la C.C.E., Quito 2004: Best Short film of the Week for El Chirisiqui
- Festival Mirada Joven, Cuenca 2004:
  - Best Director for El Chirisiqui
  - Best Photography for Zapatos Rotos
  - Best Short Subject for El Chirisiqui
  - Special Mention for Editing for Zapatos Rotos
  - Nomination for Best Photography for El Chirisiqui
  - Nomination for Best Experimental for El Chirisiqui
- Festival V.I.A.R.T., Caracas 2005: Nomination and Exhibition of El Chiriyacu, Obsesión and Ni Tu Ni Nadie
- Washington DC International Film Festival, Washington, D.C. 2007: Best Film in the Making, Sneak Preview, and

Official Selection for El Silencio No Existe
