= Mount Masaraga =

Volcano on the island of Luzon, Philippines

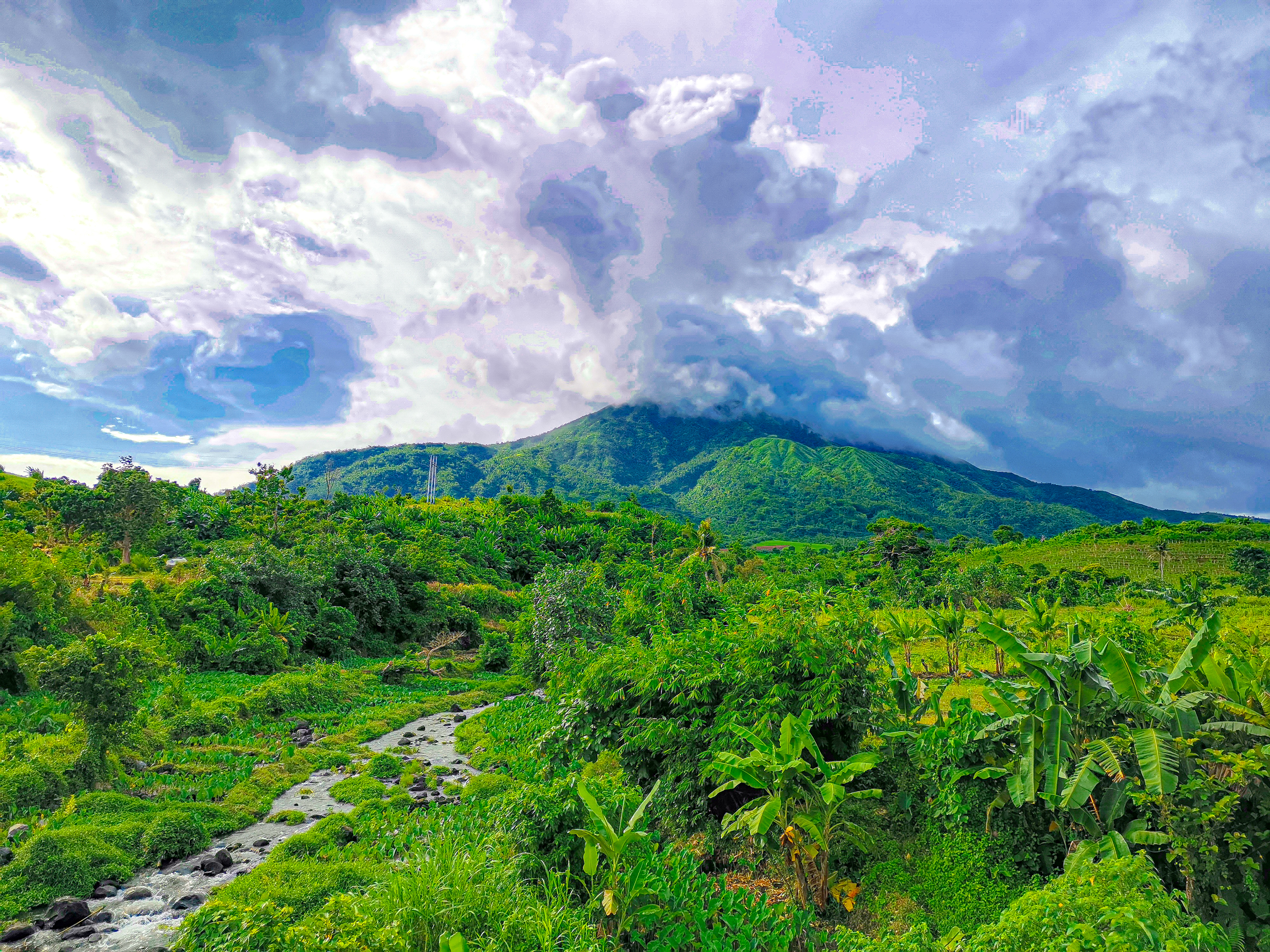

Highest point
- Elevation: 1,328 m (4,357 ft)
- Prominence: 1,003 m (3,291 ft)
- Listing: Inactive volcano Ribu
- Coordinates: 13°19′N 123°36′E

Geography
- Location within Albay Location within Luzon Location within Philippines
- Country: Philippines
- Region: Bicol Region
- Province: Albay
- City/municipality: Ligao

Geology
- Mountain type: stratovolcano
- Volcanic zone: Bicol Volcanic Chain
- Last eruption: Unknown / Holocene

Mount Masaraga is a stratovolcano located in Ligao City in the province of Albay, in the Bicol region, on Luzon Island, in the Philippines.

== Physical features ==
Mount Masaraga is a forested, sharp-topped, mountain with an elevation of 1,328 metres (4,357 ft) asl. It is adjacent and the closest to the perfect cone of Mayon Volcano.

== Eruptions ==
There are no historical eruptions from the volcano with the last eruptive activity dated as Holocene as reported by the Global Volcanism Program. Thick lava flows from that period are present on the flanks of Mount Masaraga, an understudied volcano in the Philippines.

== Geology ==
Rock type found on the mountain is andesite trending to rhyolite. Tectonically, Masaraga is part of the Bicol Volcanic Chain of volcanoes and part of the Pacific ring of fire.

== Listings ==
The Philippine Institute of Volcanology and Seismology (PHIVOLCS) lists the mountain as one of the inactive volcanoes of the Philippines.

== See also ==
- List of volcanoes in the Philippines
