= Camilo Pérez (boxer) =

Puerto Rican boxer

Personal information
- Nationality: Puerto Rico
- Born: December 9, 1990 (age 35) Carolina, Puerto Rico
- Height: 5 ft 5 in (165 cm)
- Weight: Super bantamweight

Boxing career

Boxing record
- Total fights: 11
- Wins: 9
- Win by KO: 4
- Losses: 2
- Draws: 0
- No contests: 0

Camilo Pérez
Medal record

Representing Puerto Rico

Men's Boxing

Central American and Caribbean Games
Gold medal – first place	Mayagüez 2010	Bantamweight

Camilo Pérez (born December 9, 1990) is a Puerto Rican professional boxer. As an amateur, he represented Puerto Rico in several international competitions, winning the bantamweight national title, 2010 Pan American Elite Championships and 2010 Central American and Caribbean Games.

== Amateur career ==
On June 10, 2010, Pérez was able to gain the final place in the national team, defeating youth competitor Félix Verdejo by points (14:3). The following week, he participated in the 2010 Pan American Elite Championships along his teammates, debuting with a victory over the competitor of the Dominican Republic. In the second round, Pérez defeated Elias Emigdio of Mexico (8:6). He went on to win the tournament, recording a 7:0 decision over Kenny Lally of Canada. At the 2010 Central American and Caribbean Games, Pérez debuted by defeating Alexander Millán of Venezuela (16:9). He advanced to the medal round with an 18:7 victory in a rematch against Emigdio. In the semifinals, he was paired against Jorge Nuñez of the Dominican Republic, winning by unanimous decision (11:3). In the finals, Pérez defeated Óscar Negrete of Colombia to win the gold medal.

== Professional career ==
On November 4, 2010, Pérez announced that he would sign a professional contract, closing his amateur career after 82 contests. On that date his trainer, José Bonilla, noted that he would move up to the super bantamweight division, citing difficulty to make the bantamweight professional limit of 118 pounds. Pérez debuted on February 25, 2011, defeating Jaime González by technical knockout in two rounds, following three knockdowns. He won his second contest a month later, dispatching Desi Williams in the first round. On May 6, 2011, Pérez fought Sigfredo Medina, who refused to answer the bell for the fourth and final round.

== See also ==
- List of Puerto Ricans
- List of Puerto Rican boxing world champions
