= 1872 =

1872 in various calendars
- Gregorian calendar: 1872; MDCCCLXXII
- Ab urbe condita: 2625
- Armenian calendar: 1321; ԹՎ ՌՅԻԱ
- Assyrian calendar: 6622
- Baháʼí calendar: 28–29
- Balinese saka calendar: 1793–1794
- Bengali calendar: 1278–1279
- Berber calendar: 2822
- British Regnal year: 35 Vict. 1 – 36 Vict. 1
- Buddhist calendar: 2416
- Burmese calendar: 1234
- Byzantine calendar: 7380–7381
- Chinese calendar: 辛未年 (Metal Goat); 4569 or 4362 — to — 壬申年 (Water Monkey); 4570 or 4363
- Coptic calendar: 1588–1589
- Discordian calendar: 3038
- Ethiopian calendar: 1864–1865
- Hebrew calendar: 5632–5633
- Hindu calendars
- Vikram Samvat: 1928–1929
- Shaka Samvat: 1793–1794
- Kali Yuga: 4972–4973
- Holocene calendar: 11872
- Igbo calendar: 872–873
- Iranian calendar: 1250–1251
- Islamic calendar: 1288–1289
- Japanese calendar: Meiji 5 (明治５年)
- Javanese calendar: 1800–1801
- Julian calendar: Gregorian minus 12 days
- Korean calendar: 4205
- Minguo calendar: 40 before ROC 民前40年
- Nanakshahi calendar: 404
- Thai solar calendar: 2414–2415
- Tibetan calendar: ལྕགས་མོ་ལུག་ལོ་ (female Iron-Sheep); 1998 or 1617 or 845 — to — ཆུ་ཕོ་སྤྲེ་ལོ་ (male Water-Monkey); 1999 or 1618 or 846

1872 (MDCCCLXXII) was a leap year starting on Monday of the Gregorian calendar and a leap year starting on Saturday of the Julian calendar, the 1872nd year of the Common Era (CE) and Anno Domini (AD) designations, the 872nd year of the 2nd millennium, the 72nd year of the 19th century, and the 3rd year of the 1870s decade. As of the start of 1872, the Gregorian calendar was 12 days ahead of the Julian calendar, which remained in localized use until 1923.

== Events ==
=== January ===
- January 12 – Yohannes IV is crowned Emperor of Ethiopia in Axum, the first ruler crowned in that city in over 500 years.
- January 20 – The Cavite mutiny was an uprising of Filipino military personnel of Fort San Felipe, the Spanish arsenal in Cavite, Philippine Islands.

=== February ===
- February 2 – The government of the United Kingdom buys a number of forts on the Gold Coast, from the Netherlands.
- February 4 – A great solar flare, and associated geomagnetic storm, makes northern lights visible as far south as Cuba.
- February 13 – Rex, the most famous parade on Mardi Gras, parades for the first time in New Orleans for Grand Duke Alexei Alexandrovich of Russia.
- February 17 – Filipino priests José Burgos, Mariano Gomez and Jacinto Zamora, collectively known as Gomburza, are executed in Bagumbayan Fields, Manila, Philippines by the authorities of New Spain, on charges of subversion arising from the 1872 Cavite mutiny.
- February 20 – The Metropolitan Museum of Art opens in New York City.
- February 22 – The Prohibition Party holds its first national convention in Columbus, Ohio, nominating James Black as its presidential nominee.

=== March ===
- March 1 – In the United States, Yellowstone National Park (once dubbed "Colter's Hell" after John Colter, of the Lewis and Clark Expedition) is established as the world's first national park.
- March 4 – The Boston Globe is founded in Boston, Massachusetts, as the largest newspaper of the New England region.
- March 5
  - George Westinghouse receives a United States patent for the "failsafe" automatic railway air brake.
  - The Tichborne case is decided in London against claimant Arthur Orton (who, as a result, is convicted of perjury in 1874).
- March 9 – Alfred B. Miller and Elmer Crockett found the South Bend Tribune newspaper in the United States.
- March 11 – Work begins on the Seven Sisters Colliery in South Wales, located on one of the richest coal sources in Britain.
- March 16 – 1872 FA Cup Final: In the first ever final of the FA Cup, the world's oldest football competition, Wanderers F.C. defeat Royal Engineers A.F.C. 1–0 at The Oval in Kennington, London.
- March 26 – The 7.4–7.9 M_{w} Lone Pine earthquake shakes eastern California, with a maximum Mercalli intensity of X (Extreme); 27 people are killed and 56 injured.

=== April ===
- April 10 – The first Arbor Day is celebrated in Nebraska.
- April – Japan introduces its first modern paper currency (designed by Italian engraver Edoardo Chiossone) in the form of Meiji Tsuho notes. These are initially worth up to 1 yen before higher denominations are printed/released in June and August.

=== May ===
- May 4 – The magazine Popular Science is first published in the United States.
- May 10 – Victoria Woodhull becomes the first woman nominated for President of the United States, although she is a year too young to qualify and does not appear on the ballot.
- May 14 – The Battle of Mañaria, near Bilbao, Spain during the Third Carlist War (1872–1876).
- May 15 – The New Zealand Wars end after 17 years, with the conclusion of Te Kooti's War; Maori spiritual leader Te Kooti Arikirangi Te Turuk crosses the Waikato River, and enters the territory of the Māori King Tāwhiao, where he is granted asylum.
- May 22
  - Reconstruction: U.S. President Ulysses S. Grant signs the Amnesty Act of 1872 into law, restoring full civil rights to all but about 500 Confederate sympathizers.
  - Georges Bizet's comic opera Djamileh is premièred at the Opéra-Comique in Paris, France.
- May – Rangers F.C., founded in March as an Association football club in Glasgow (Scotland) by brothers Moses and Peter McNeil, Peter Campbell and William McBeath, play their first ever game on the public pitches of Glasgow Green, a 0 to 0 draw against Callander.

=== June ===
- June 14 – Trade unions are legalised in Canada.
- June 15 – Thomas Hardy anonymously publishes his novel Under the Greenwood Tree in England.

=== July ===
- July 1
  - Thomas François Burgers becomes State President of the South African Republic.
  - Schenker, predecessor of DB Schenker, the worldwide logistics and freight operator, is founded in Vienna, Austria.
- July 4
  - The Society of Jesus is pronounced illegal in the German Empire.
  - Tsukuba University is founded in Japan, as a teacher training college.
- July 15 – Hochi Mail News, later Hochi Daily News, a Japanese language newspaper, is first published in Tokyo, although it changes coverage from general news to a sports newspaper from December 1949.

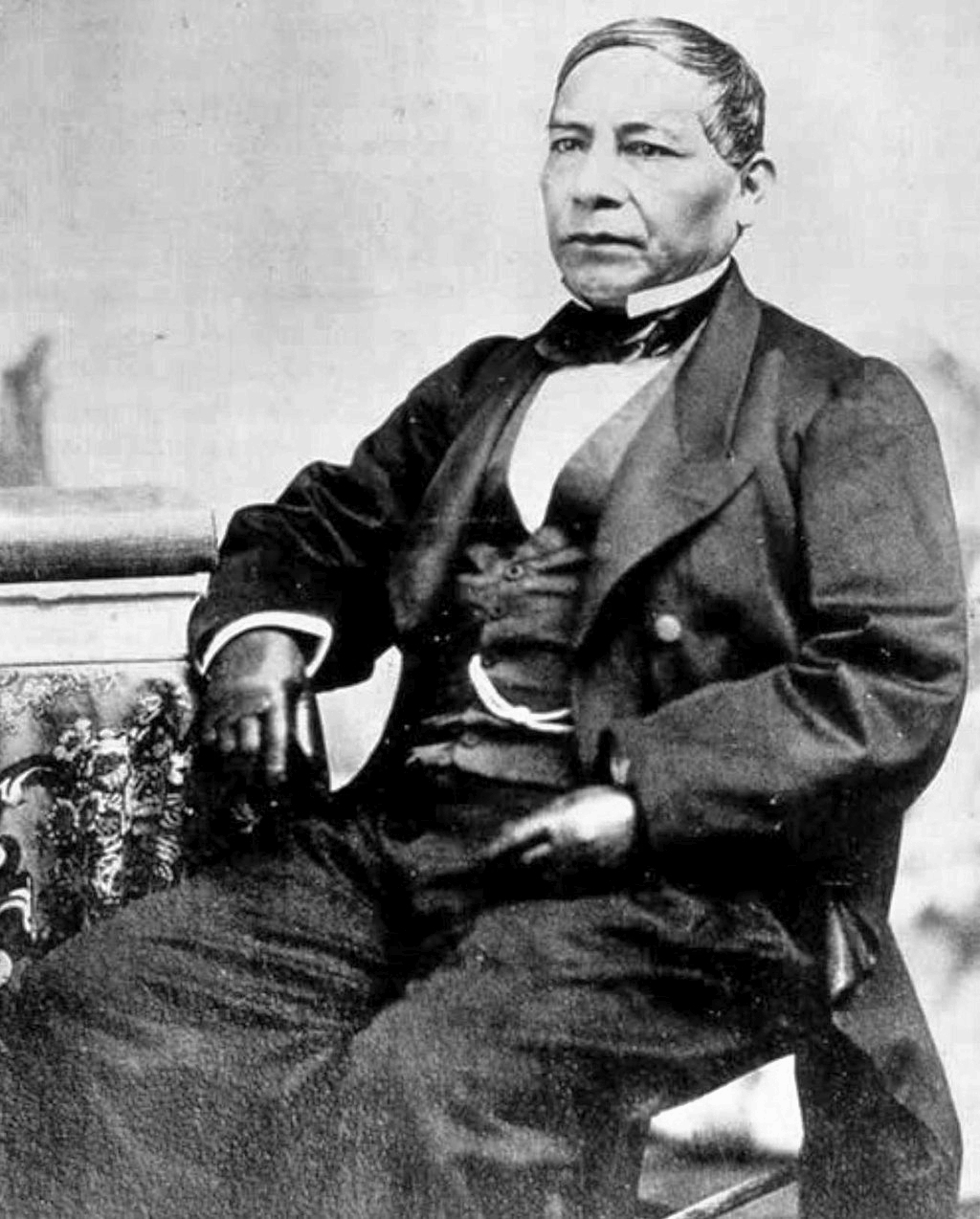
Daguerreotype of Benito Juárez as president of Mexico.

- July 18 – Mexican President Benito Juarez dies of a heart attack, and Sebastián Lerdo de Tejada becomes interim president.
- July 19 – Explorer William Gosse reaches Uluru in central Australia and names it Ayers Rock.

=== August ===
- August 22 – The Australian Overland Telegraph Line is completed, providing a telegraphic link between Australia and the rest of the world for the first time.

=== September ===
- September 1 – A group of Icaiche Maya under Marcos Canul attack the British garrison at Orange Walk Town in British Honduras.
- September 17 – Shiseido Pharmacy Shop, predecessor of Shiseido, a major worldwide cosmetics brand, is founded in Ginza, Tokyo, Japan.
- September 18 – Upon the death of King Charles XV and IV of Sweden-Norway, he is succeeded as King of both crowns by his brother Oscar II.
- September 26 – The first Shriners Temple (called Mecca) is established in New York City.

=== October ===
- October 1 – The Virginia Agricultural and Mechanical College begins its first academic session (the university is later renamed Virginia Tech). The first case is reported in Toronto, Ontario, Canada, of the Great Epizootic of 1872 (equine influenza, or the "horse flu") which will substantially disrupt life in North America by mid-December.
- October 15 – Tongzhi, The 8th Emperor of the Qing dynasty marries Lady Alute (Empress Jiashun)
- October 16 – University College Wales (later to become Aberystwyth University) begins its first academic session.

=== November ===
- November 5
  - 1872 United States presidential election: Ulysses S. Grant defeats Horace Greeley.
  - Women's suffrage: In defiance of the law, American suffragist Susan B. Anthony votes for the first time (on November 18 she is served an arrest warrant, and in the subsequent trial is fined $100, which she never pays).
- November 7 – The Mary Celeste sets sail from New York; bound for Genoa, Italy.
- November 9 – Great Boston Fire of 1872: In Boston, Massachusetts, a large fire begins to burn on Lincoln Street (the 2-day disaster destroys about 65 acres (0.26 km^{2}) of the city, 776 buildings, much of the financial district and causes US$60 million in damage).
- November 11 – U.S. government geologist Clarence King reveals the diamond hoax in Wyoming.
- November 12 – Dresdner Bank is founded in Dresden, Germany.
- November 13 – Claude Monet begins painting Impression, Sunrise (Impression, soleil levant, the painting that will give a name to Impressionism) as viewed from his hotel room at Le Havre in France.
- November 16 – The first ever Metropolitan Police strike in London.
- November 22 – "Spitzeder Swindle": Adele Spitzeder's pioneering Ponzi scheme in Munich collapses.
- November 27 – A meteor shower display of Andromedids is seen over France.
- November 29
  - American Indian Wars: The Modoc War begins with the Battle of Lost River.
  - Horace Greeley, President Ulysses S. Grant's opponent in this year's U.S. presidential election, dies. His electoral votes are divided among several candidates.
- November 30 – The first international Association football match to be recognised (retrospectively) by FIFA as "official" takes place at Hamilton Crescent, Scotland; the result is Scotland 0-0 England. Earlier international football matches have already taken place in 1870, in 1871 and again in 1872 at the Oval, London.

=== December ===
- December 1
  - Sebastián Lerdo de Tejada becomes constitutional President of Mexico.
  - Responsible government is granted to Cape Colony (South Africa). Sir John Molteno, first Prime Minister of the Cape of Good Hope, forms the first Cape Cabinet which immediately plans to establish Cape Government Railways and take over the operation of all private railways in the Colony.
- December 3 – Assyriologist George Smith presents the first translation of the Epic of Gilgamesh, to a meeting of the Society of Biblical Archaeology in London.
- December 4 – The now-crewless American ship Mary Celeste is found (still seaworthy) by the British brig Dei Gratia in the Atlantic.
- December 9 – In Louisiana, P. B. S. Pinchback becomes the first African-American to govern a U.S. state.
- December 14 – President Ulysses S. Grant establishes the San Carlos Apache Reservation, in southeastern Arizona.
- December 21 – Challenger expedition: HMS Challenger (1858) sails from Portsmouth, England, on the 4-year scientific expedition that lays the foundation for the science of oceanography.

=== Date unknown ===
- In the aftermath of the Paraguayan War, the new government of Paraguay makes peace with Brazil, granting reparations and territorial concessions.
- The Kolozsvári Egyetem, predecessor of the University of Szeged, is founded.
- Under Japan's Meiji Restoration:
  - A conscription law, modeled on the French version, is issued.
  - Universal public schools are called for.
- The first Marist Brothers travel to Australia.
- S. T. Dupont begins the manufacture of luxury leather goods in France.
- Kimberly, Clark and Co. is founded in Neenah, Wisconsin, by John A. Kimberly, Charles B. Clark, Havilah Babcock and Franklyn C. Shattuck.
- Essendon Football Club is founded in Melbourne, Australia.
- Summer: Swedish teacher, scholar, folklorist and museum director Artur Hazelius begins the Scandinavian-etnographic collection, which becomes the foundation to the Nordic Museum and Skansen open-air museum in Stockholm.

== Births ==
=== January–March ===
- January 6 – Alexander Scriabin, Russian composer (d. 1915)
- January 11 – Georg Karo, German archaeologist (d. 1963)
- January 14 – Kerstin Hesselgren, Swedish politician (d. 1962)
- January 20 – Julia Morgan, American architect (d. 1957)
- January 23 – Gotse Delchev, Bulgarian revolutionary (d. 1903)
- January 31 – Zane Grey, American writer (d. 1939)
- February 2 – Abul Kasem, Bengali politician (d. 1936)
- February 5 – Mateo García de los Reyes, Spanish admiral and minister of the navy, organizer and first chief of the Spanish Navy submarine force (d. 1936)
- February 6 – Robert Maillart, Swiss civil engineer (d. 1940)
- February 11 – Hannah Mitchell, English socialist, suffragette (d. 1956)
- February 19 – Johan Pitka, Estonian entrepreneur, sea captain, and admiral (d. 1944)
- February 27 – Alexandru Vaida-Voevod, 3-time prime minister of Romania (d. 1950)
- February 28 – Mehdi Frashëri, Albanian politician, 15th Prime Minister of Albania (d. 1963)
- March 3 – Willie Keeler, American baseball player (d. 1923)
- March 7 – Piet Mondrian, Dutch painter (d. 1944)
- March 18 – Ludwig Herzer, Austrian musician and composer (d. 1939)
- March 19 – Anna Held, Polish-born French actress (d. 1918)
- March 23 – Michael Joseph Savage, 23rd Prime Minister of New Zealand (d. 1940)
- March 28 – José Sanjurjo, Spanish general (d. 1936)

=== April–June ===
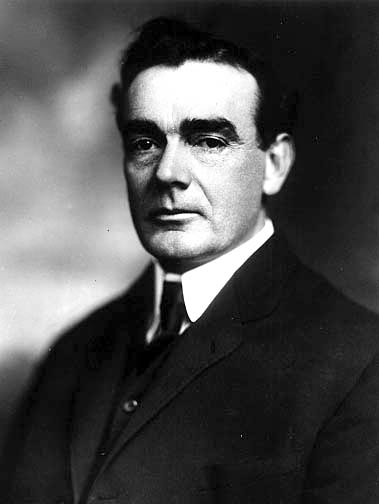
Ladislas Lazaro

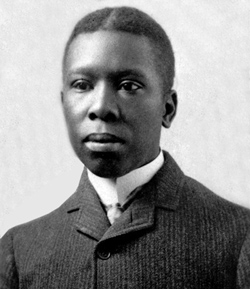
Paul Laurence Dunbar

- April 9 – Léon Blum, French politician, Prime Minister of France (d. 1950)
- April 14 – Abdullah Yusuf Ali, Indian-born Islamic scholar, translator (d. 1953)
- April 29 – Harry Payne Whitney, American businessman, horse breeder (d. 1930)
- May 1 – Sidónio Pais, 4th President, 66th Prime Minister of Portugal (d. 1918)
- May 2 – Ichiyō Higuchi, Japanese author (d. 1896)
- May 6 – William Bowie, American geodetic engineer (d. 1940)
- May 12 – Anton Korošec, Slovenian political leader (d. 1940)
- May 18 – Bertrand Russell, British philosopher and mathematician, recipient of the Nobel Prize in Literature (d. 1970)
- May 22 – Kim Gap-sun, bureaucrat and modern Korean businessman, politician, and realtor(d. 1961)
- May 31
  - Charles Greeley Abbot, American astrophysicist (d. 1973)
  - W. Heath Robinson, British cartoonist, illustrator (d. 1944)
- June 3 – Saburō Hyakutake, Japanese admiral (d. 1963)
- June 5 – Ladislas Lazaro, U.S. Representatives from Louisiana (d. 1927)
- June 6 – Alexandra Feodorovna (Alix of Hesse) (d. 1918)
- June 8 – Jan Frans De Boever, Belgian painter (d. 1949)
- June 22 – Charles Murray, American actor (d. 1941)
- June 27 – Paul Laurence Dunbar, American poet, publisher (d. 1906)

=== July–September ===
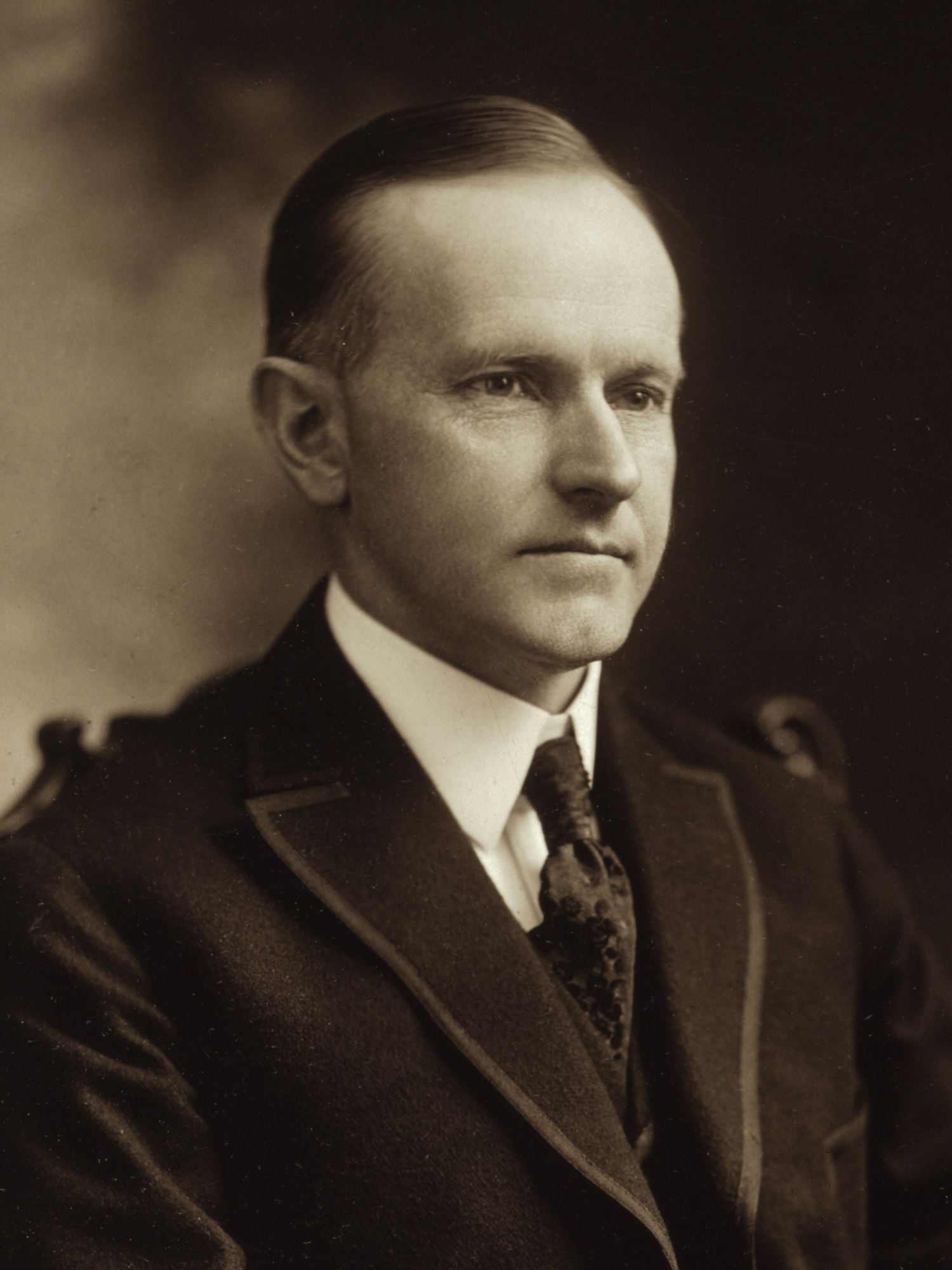
Calvin Coolidge

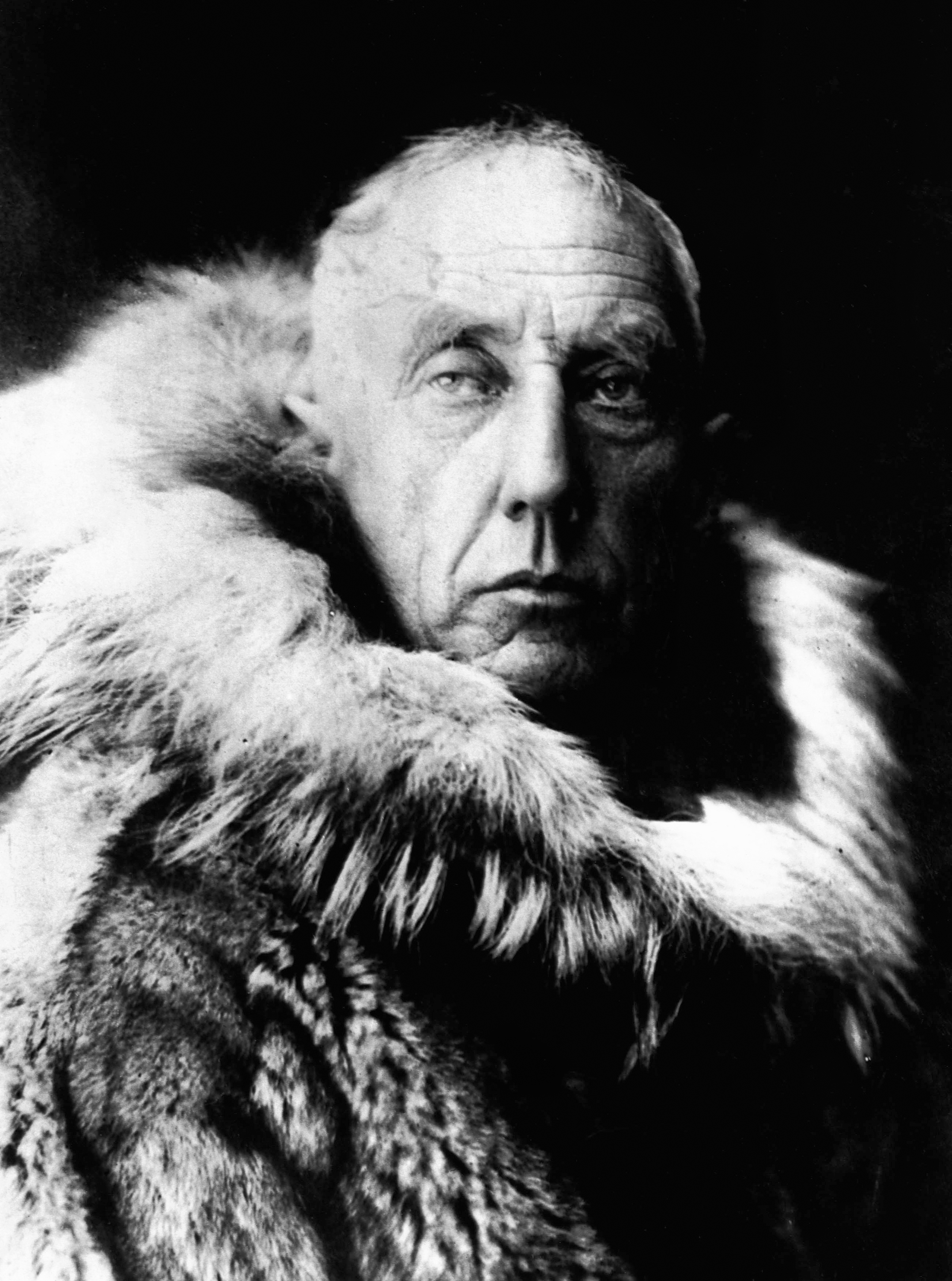
Roald Amundsen

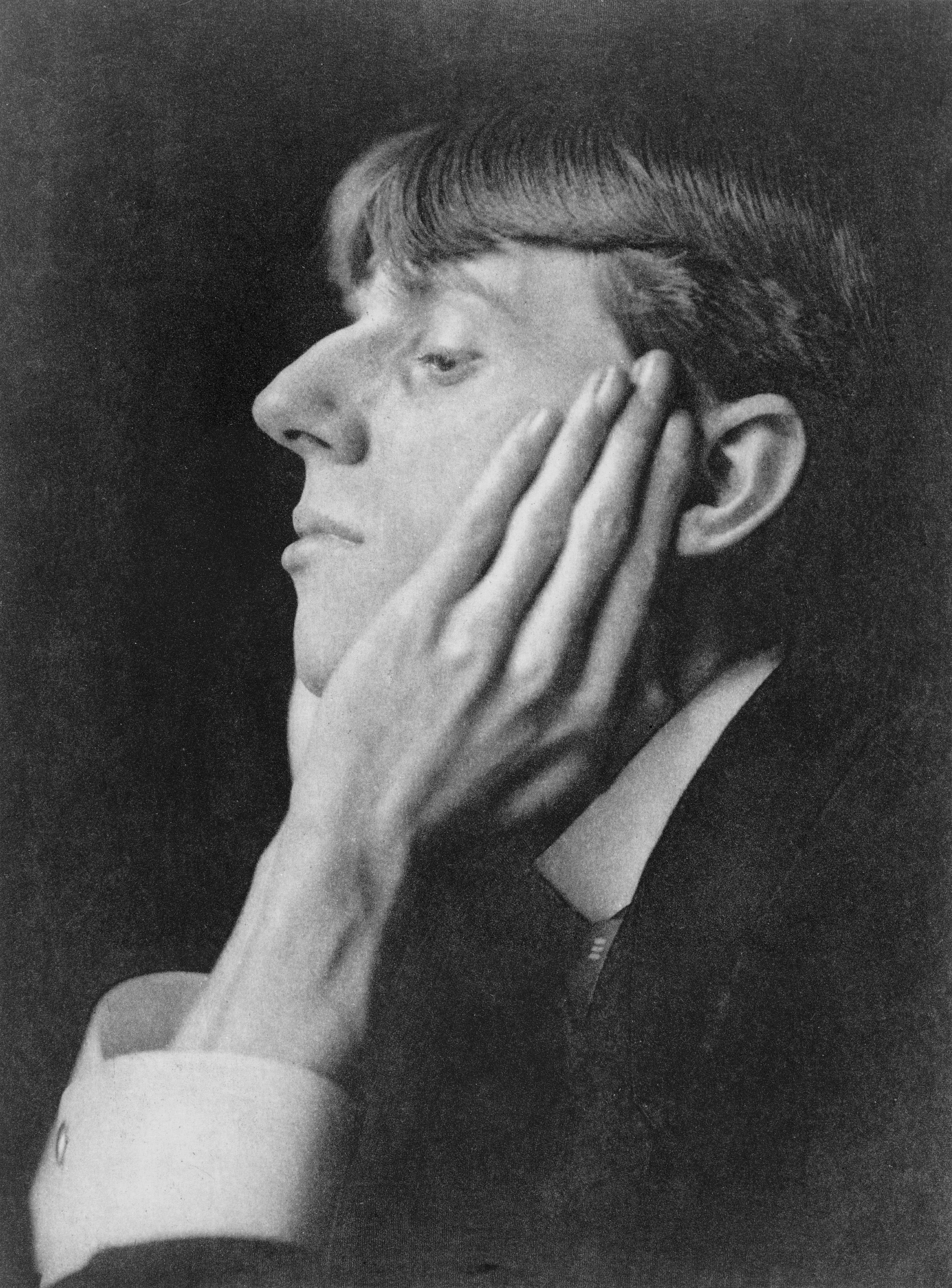
Aubrey Beardsley

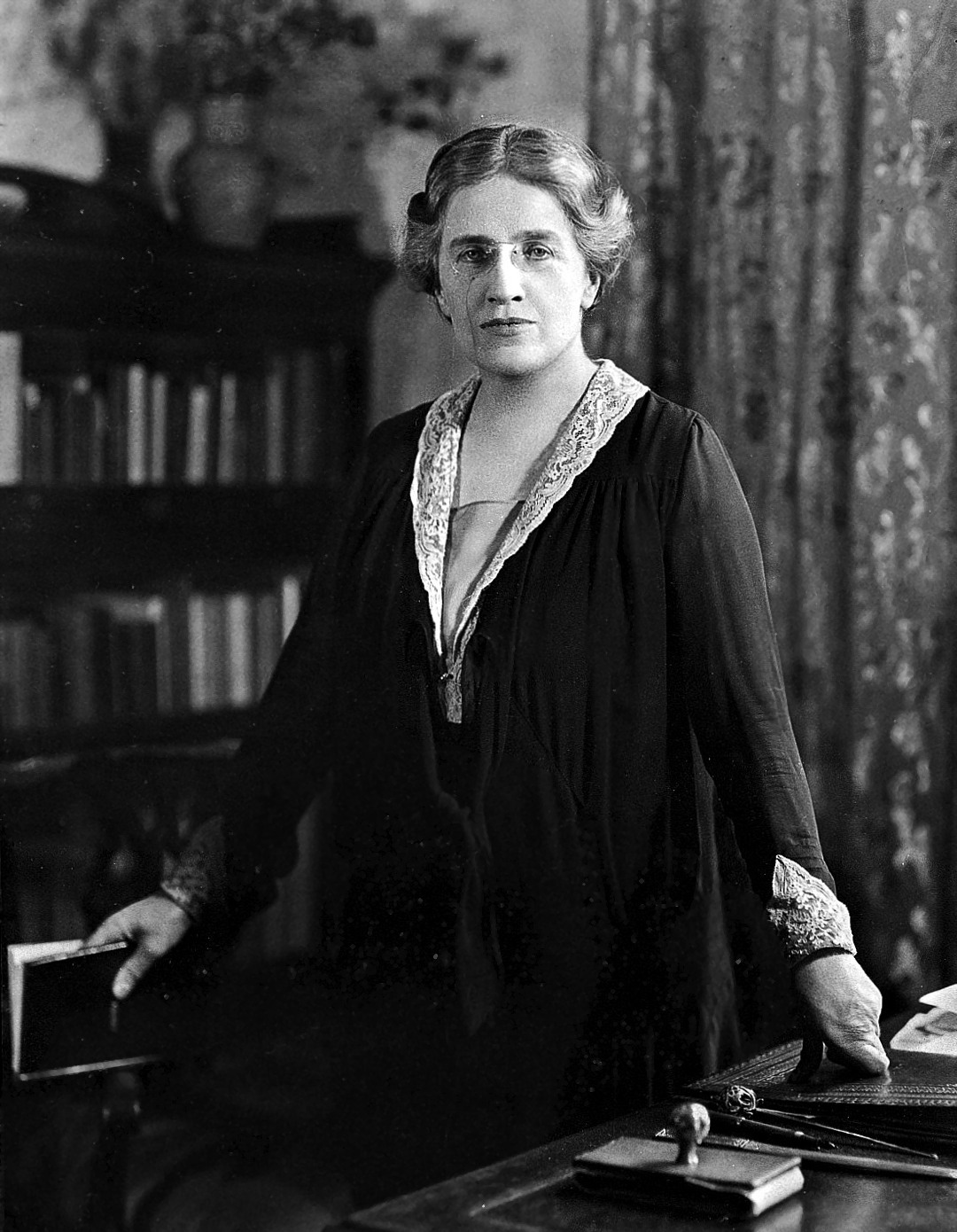
Louisa Martindale

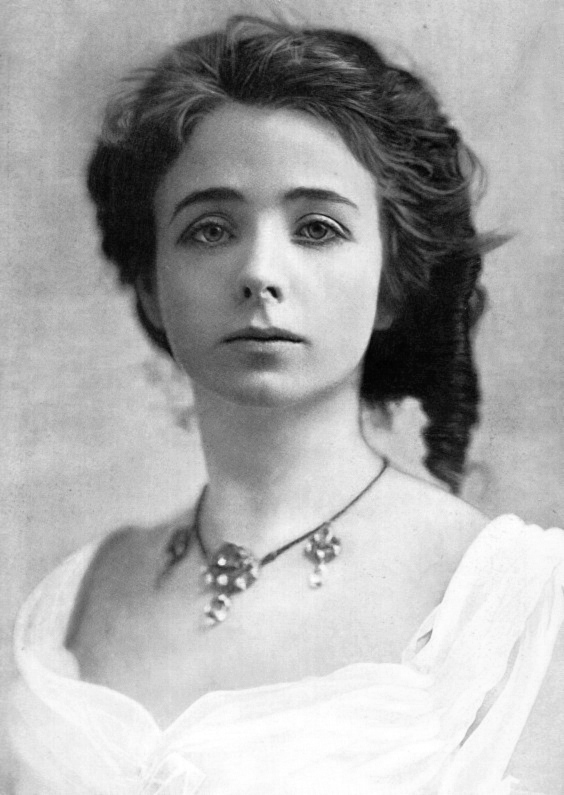
Maude Adams

- July 1 – Louis Blériot, French aviation pioneer (d. 1936)
- July 4 – Calvin Coolidge, 30th President of the United States (d. 1933)
- July 5 – Édouard Herriot, 3-time prime minister of France (d. 1957)
- July 12 – Emil Hácha, 3rd President of Czechoslovakia (d. 1945)
- July 16 – Roald Amundsen, Norwegian polar explorer (d. 1928)
- July 23 – Edward Adrian Wilson, English polar explorer (d. 1912)
- July 28 – Albert Sarraut, 2-time prime minister of France (d. 1962)
- August 3 – King Haakon VII of Norway (d. 1957)
- August 9 – Archduke Joseph August of Austria, Austrian field marshal (d. 1962)
- August 10 – William Manuel Johnson, American jazz double-bassist (d. 1972)
- August 13 – Richard Willstätter, German chemist, Nobel Prize laureate (d. 1942)
- August 15 – Sri Aurobindo, Indian nationalist, writer and mystic (d. 1950)
- August 21 – Aubrey Beardsley, English illustrator (d. 1898)
- August 23 – Egerton Reuben Stedman, Canadian politician (d. 1946)
- August 26 – Joseph Taylor Robinson, American politician (d. 1937)
- September 13 – Kijūrō Shidehara, 31st Prime Minister of Japan (d. 1951)
- September 20 – Maurice Gamelin, French general (d. 1958)
- September 21 – Henry Tingle Wilde, British mariner, Chief Officer RMS Titanic (d. 1912)
- September 28 – David Unaipon, Aboriginal Australian preacher, author and inventor (d. 1967)

=== October–December ===
- October 4 – Roger Keyes, 1st Baron Keyes, British admiral (d. 1945)
- October 6 – Carl Gustaf Ekman, 2-time prime minister of Sweden (d. 1945)
- October 11
  - Harlan F. Stone, Chief Justice of the United States (d. 1946)
  - Emily Davidson, English suffragist (d. 1913)
- October 12 – Ralph Vaughan Williams, English composer (d. 1958)
- October 15
  - Wilhelm Miklas, 3rd President of Austria (d. 1956)
  - Edith Wilson, First Lady of the United States (d. 1961)
- October 27 – Emily Post, American etiquette expert (d. 1960)
- October 30 – Louisa Martindale, British physician, writer, magistrate and prison commissioner (d. 1966)
- November 1 – Louis Dewis, Belgian Post-Impressionist painter (d. 1946)
- November 4 – Barbu Știrbey, 30th Prime Minister of Romania (d. 1946)
- November 11 – Maude Adams, American stage actress (d. 1953)
- November 20 – Joseph M. Reeves, American admiral (d. 1948)
- November 30 – John McCrae, Canadian soldier, surgeon and poet (d. 1918)
- December 3 – William Haselden, Spanish-born English cartoonist (d. 1953)
- December 7 – Johan Huizinga, Dutch cultural historian (d. 1945)
- December 8 – Mace Greenleaf, American actor (d. 1912)
- December 11 – René Bull, British illustrator, photographer (d. 1942)
- December 14 – John Smith Archibald, Canadian architect (d. 1934)
- December 16 – Anton Ivanovich Denikin, Imperial Russian Lieutenant General (d. 1947)
- December 21 – Lorenzo Perosi, Italian composer (d. 1956)
- December 26 – Norman Angell, English politician, recipient of the Nobel Peace Prize (d. 1967)

== Deaths ==
=== January–June ===
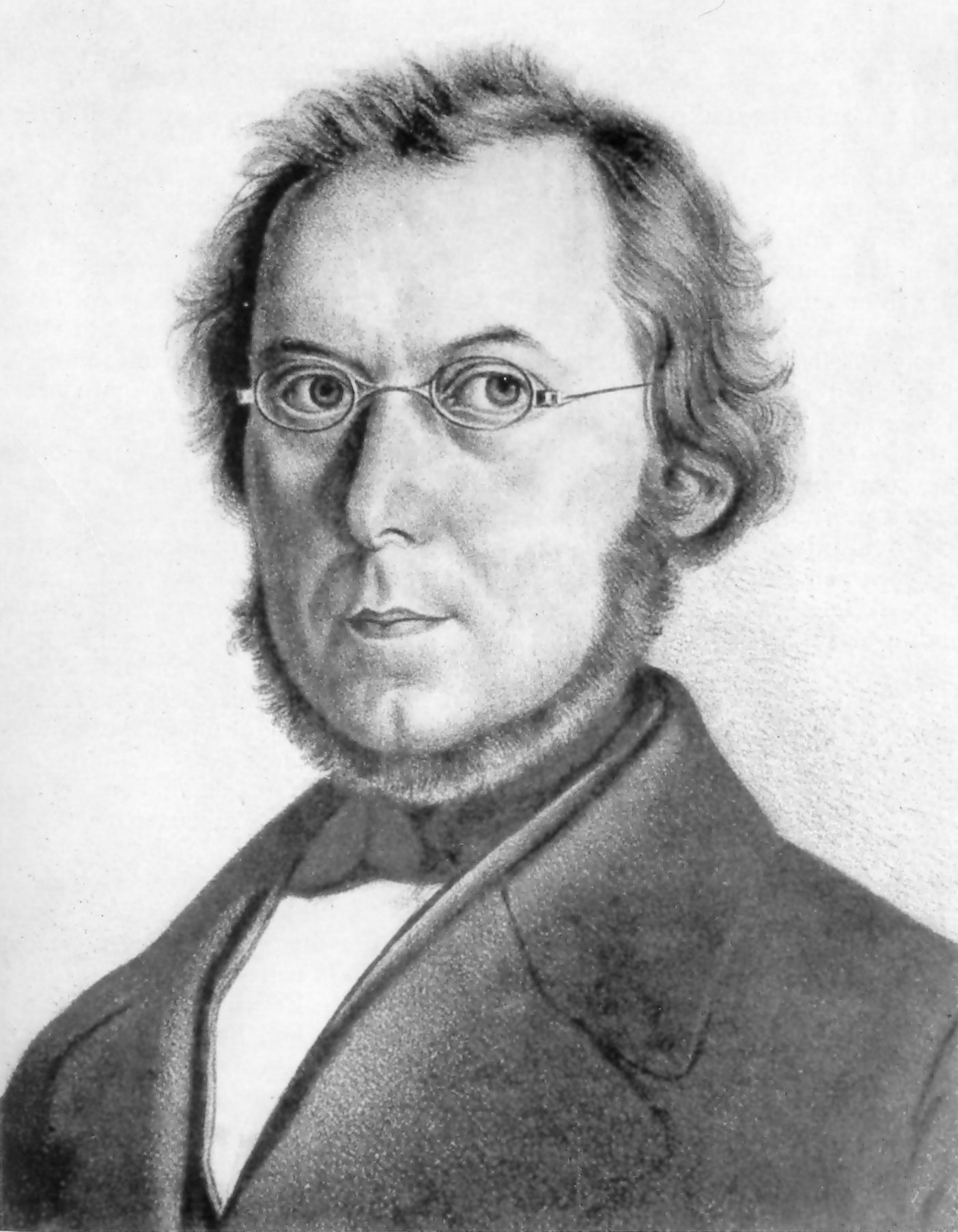
Hugo von Mohl

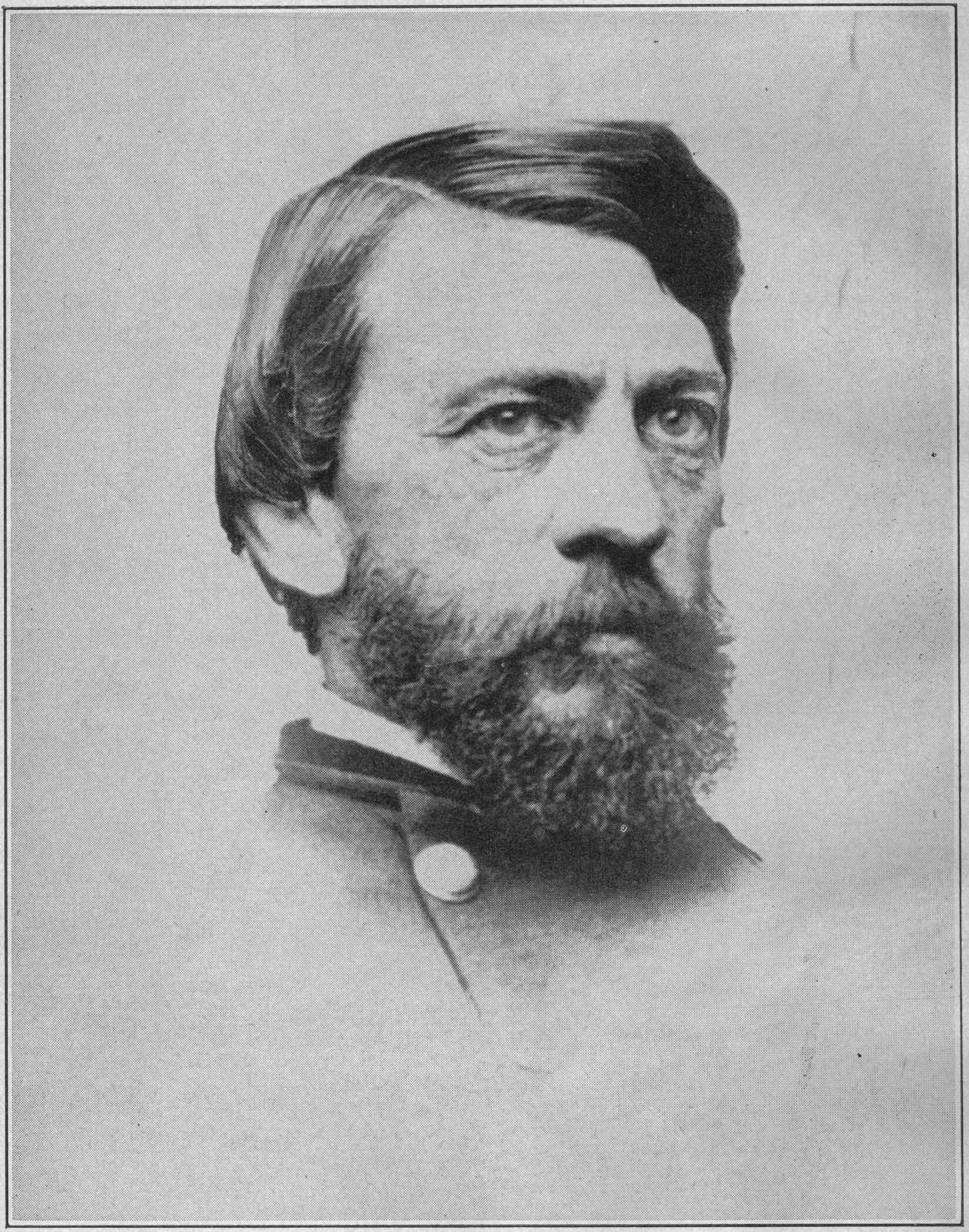
Jonathan Letterman

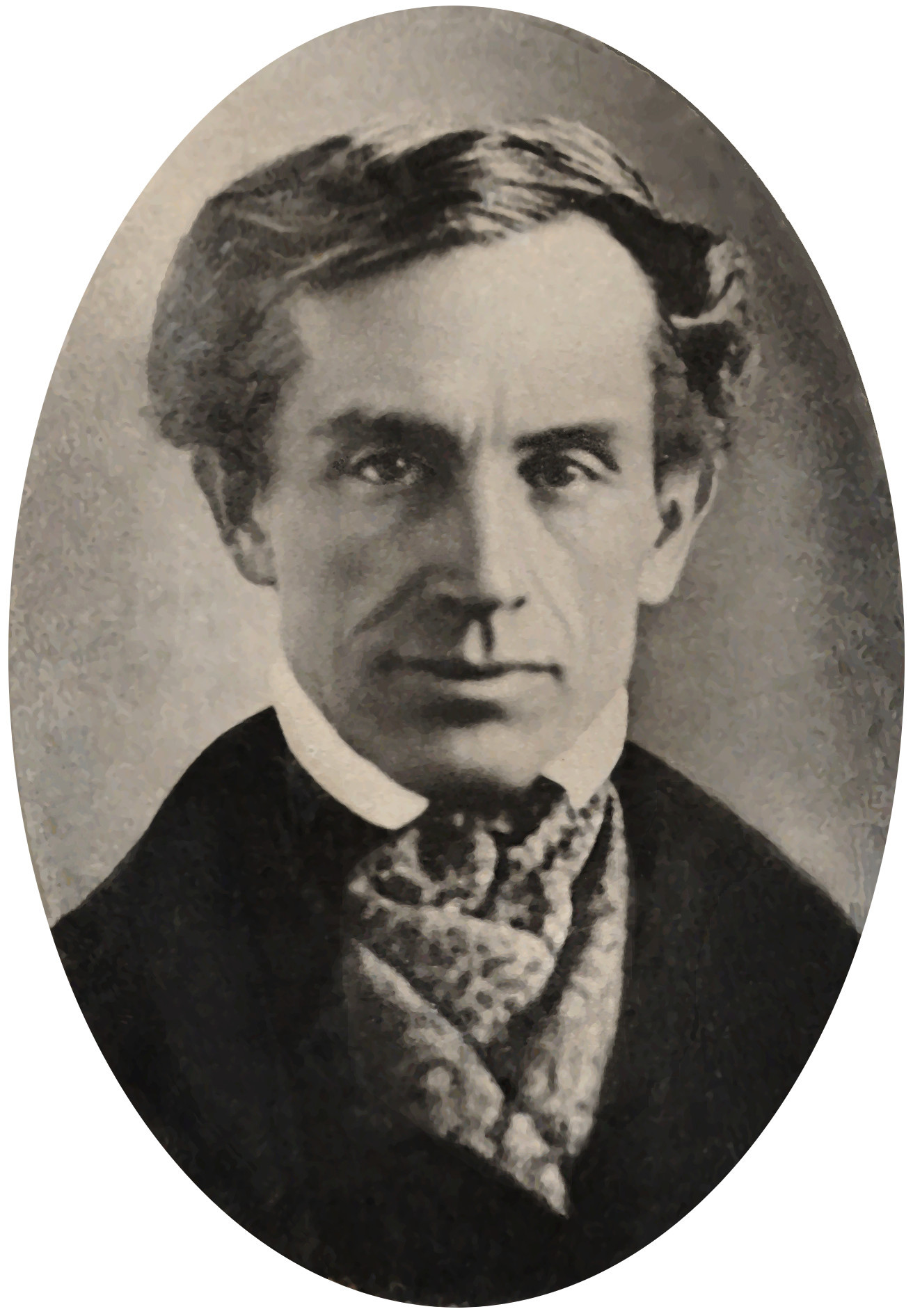
Samuel Morse

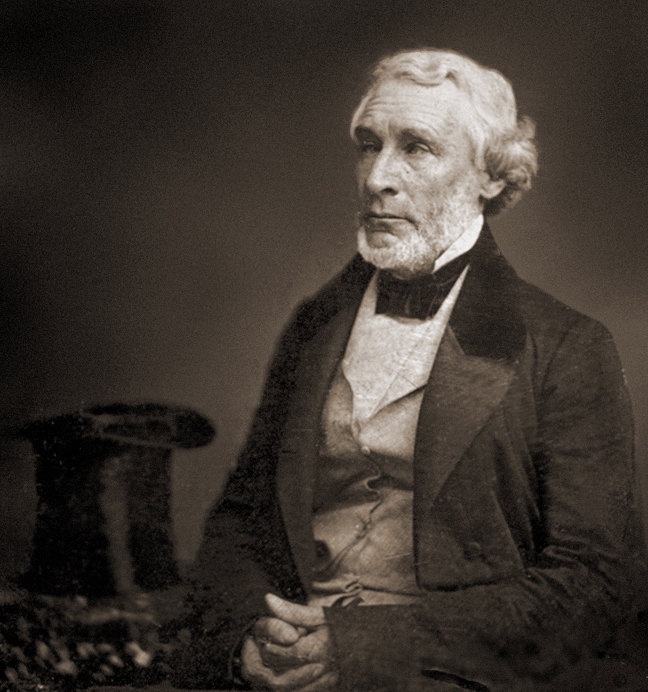
James Gordon Bennett Sr.

- January 7 – Big Jim Fisk, American financier (b. 1835)
- January 9 – Henry Halleck, American general (b. 1815)
- January 13 – William Scamp, English architect and engineer (b. 1801)
- January 21 – Franz Grillparzer, Austrian writer (b. 1791)
- February 4 – John L. Burns, American veteran of the War of 1812, civilian combatant for the Union Army during the American Civil War. (b. 1793)
- March or April – Mercator Cooper, American sea captain (b. 1803)
- March 8 – Priscilla Susan Bury, British botanist (b. 1799)
- March 11 – Emily Taylor, English schoolmistress (b. 1795)
- March 12 – Zeng Guofan (traditional Chinese: 曾國藩 ), Chinese official, military general and Confucian scholar (b. 1811)
- March 15 – Jonathan Letterman, American surgeon, "father" of battlefield medicine. (b. 1824)
- March 20 – William Wentworth, Australian explorer (b. 1790)
- April 1
  - Frederick Maurice, English theologian (b. 1805)
  - Hugo von Mohl, German botanist (b. 1805)
- April 2 – Samuel Morse, American inventor (b. 1791)
- April 16 – Adolf von Bonin, Prussian general (b. 1803)
- June 1 – James Gordon Bennett Sr., Scottish-American newspaper tycoon (b. 1795)
- June 4
  - Stanisław Moniuszko, Polish composer (b. 1819)
  - Johan Rudolph Thorbecke, Dutch politician (b. 1798)
- June 20 – Élie Frédéric Forey, Marshal of France (b. 1804)

=== July–December ===
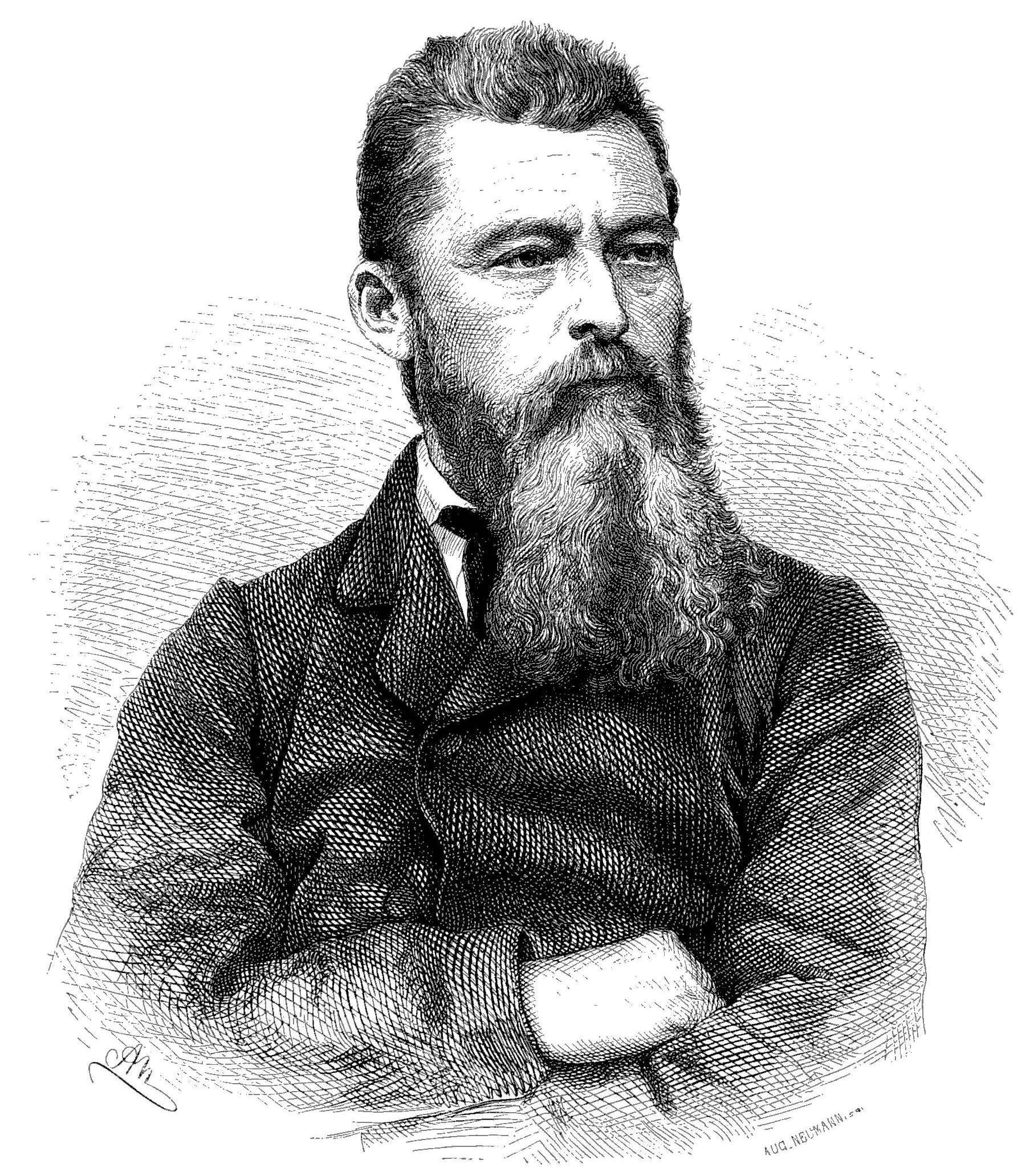
Ludwig Feuerbach

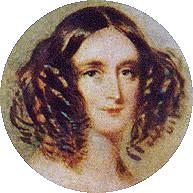
Lady Beaconsfield

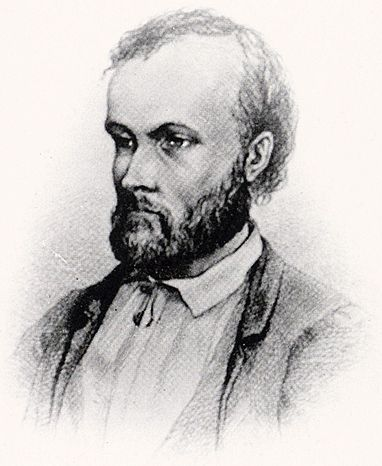
Aleksis Kivi

- July 15 – Mary Eliza Herbert, Canadian publisher and writer (b. 1829)
- July 18 – Benito Juárez, President of Mexico (1858-1872), of a heart attack (b. 1806)
- September 1 – Robert Gray, first Bishop of Cape Town (b. 1809)
- September 10 – Avram Iancu, Romanian Transylvanian insurgent (b. 1824)
- September 13 – Ludwig Feuerbach, German philosopher (b. 1804)
- September 18 – Charles XV, King of Sweden and Norway (b. 1826)
- September 18 – Ana María Martínez de Nisser, Colombian heroine, writer (b. 1812)
- October 4 – Vladimir Dal, Russian lexicographer (b. 1801)
- October 10 – William H. Seward, 24th United States Secretary of State (b. 1801)
- October 23 – Théophile Gautier, French writer (b. 1811)
- October 25 – William F. Johnston, American politician (b. 1808)
- November 6 – George Meade, American Civil War general (b. 1815)
- November 23 – Sir John Bowring, British colonial administrator, 4th Governor of Hong Kong (b. 1792)
- November 28 – Mary Somerville, British mathematician (b. 1780)
- November 29 – Horace Greeley, American newspaper editor, Democratic presidential candidate (b. 1811)
- December 15 – Lady Beaconsfield, wife of Benjamin Disraeli (b. 1792)
- December 31 – Aleksis Kivi, Finnish national author (b. 1834)

== Sources ==
- "American Annual Cyclopedia and Register of Important Events of the Year 1872". American Annual Cyclopedia and Register of Important Events of the Year. 12. New York: D. Appleton and Co.: 14 v. 1873. hdl:2027/umn.31951d00546906q. + via Google Books
