= 1812 =

1812 in various calendars
- Gregorian calendar: 1812; MDCCCXII
- Ab urbe condita: 2565
- Armenian calendar: 1261; ԹՎ ՌՄԿԱ
- Assyrian calendar: 6562
- Balinese saka calendar: 1733–1734
- Bengali calendar: 1218–1219
- Berber calendar: 2762
- British Regnal year: 52 Geo. 3 – 53 Geo. 3
- Buddhist calendar: 2356
- Burmese calendar: 1174
- Byzantine calendar: 7320–7321
- Chinese calendar: 辛未年 (Metal Goat); 4509 or 4302 — to — 壬申年 (Water Monkey); 4510 or 4303
- Coptic calendar: 1528–1529
- Discordian calendar: 2978
- Ethiopian calendar: 1804–1805
- Hebrew calendar: 5572–5573
- Hindu calendars
- Vikram Samvat: 1868–1869
- Shaka Samvat: 1733–1734
- Kali Yuga: 4912–4913
- Holocene calendar: 11812
- Igbo calendar: 812–813
- Iranian calendar: 1190–1191
- Islamic calendar: 1226–1227
- Japanese calendar: Bunka 9 (文化９年)
- Javanese calendar: 1738–1739
- Julian calendar: Gregorian minus 12 days
- Korean calendar: 4145
- Minguo calendar: 100 before ROC 民前100年
- Nanakshahi calendar: 344
- Thai solar calendar: 2354–2355
- Tibetan calendar: ལྕགས་མོ་ལུག་ལོ་ (female Iron-Sheep); 1938 or 1557 or 785 — to — ཆུ་ཕོ་སྤྲེ་ལོ་ (male Water-Monkey); 1939 or 1558 or 786

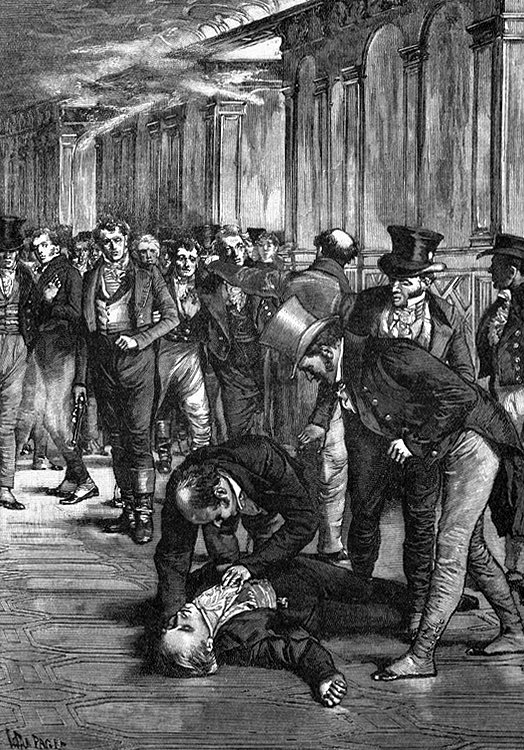
May 11: British Prime Minister Spencer Perceval is assassinated.

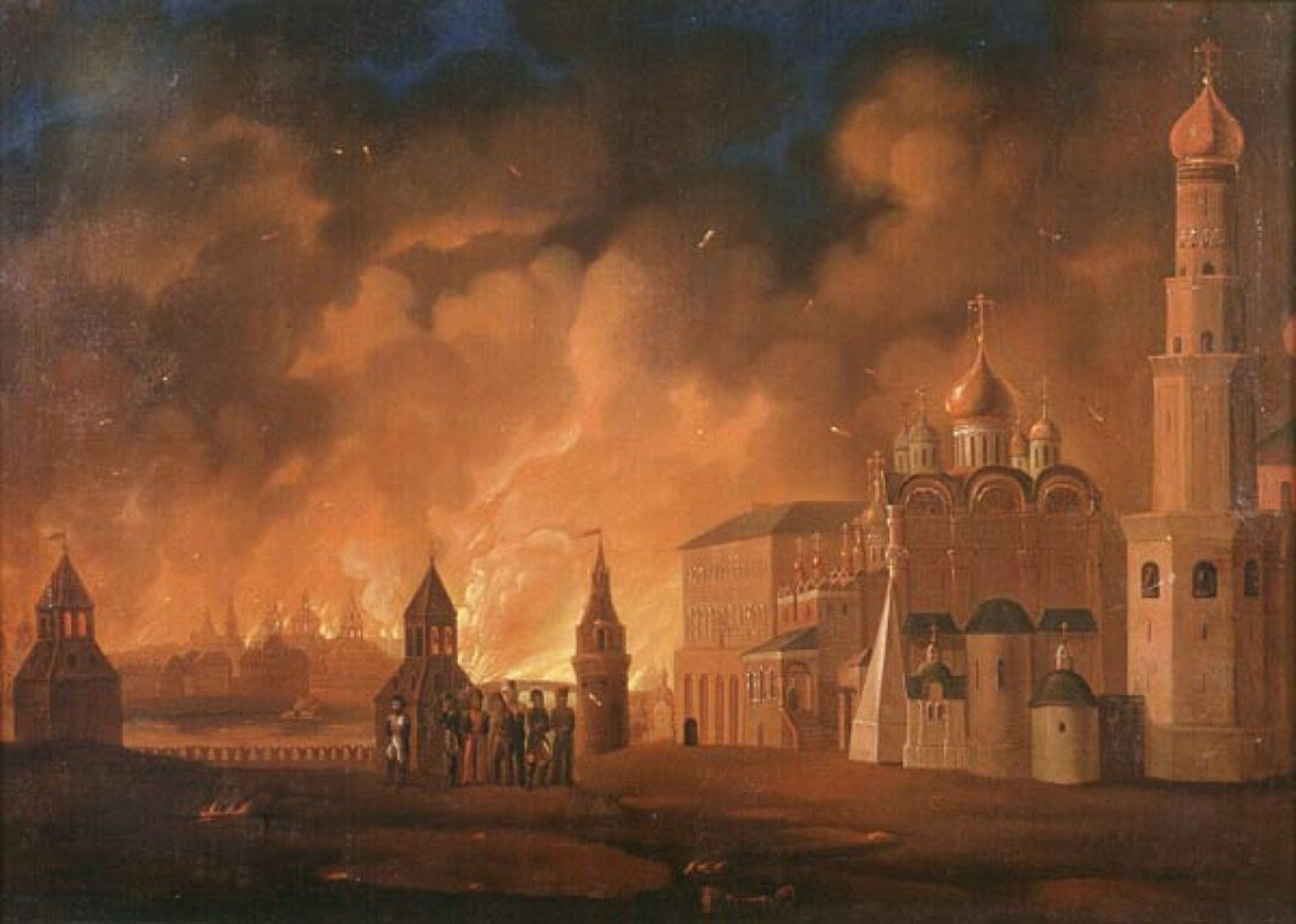
September 15: Moscow's Military Governor Rostopchin orders the Russian capital to be evacuated and burned down in advance of Napoleon's invasion.

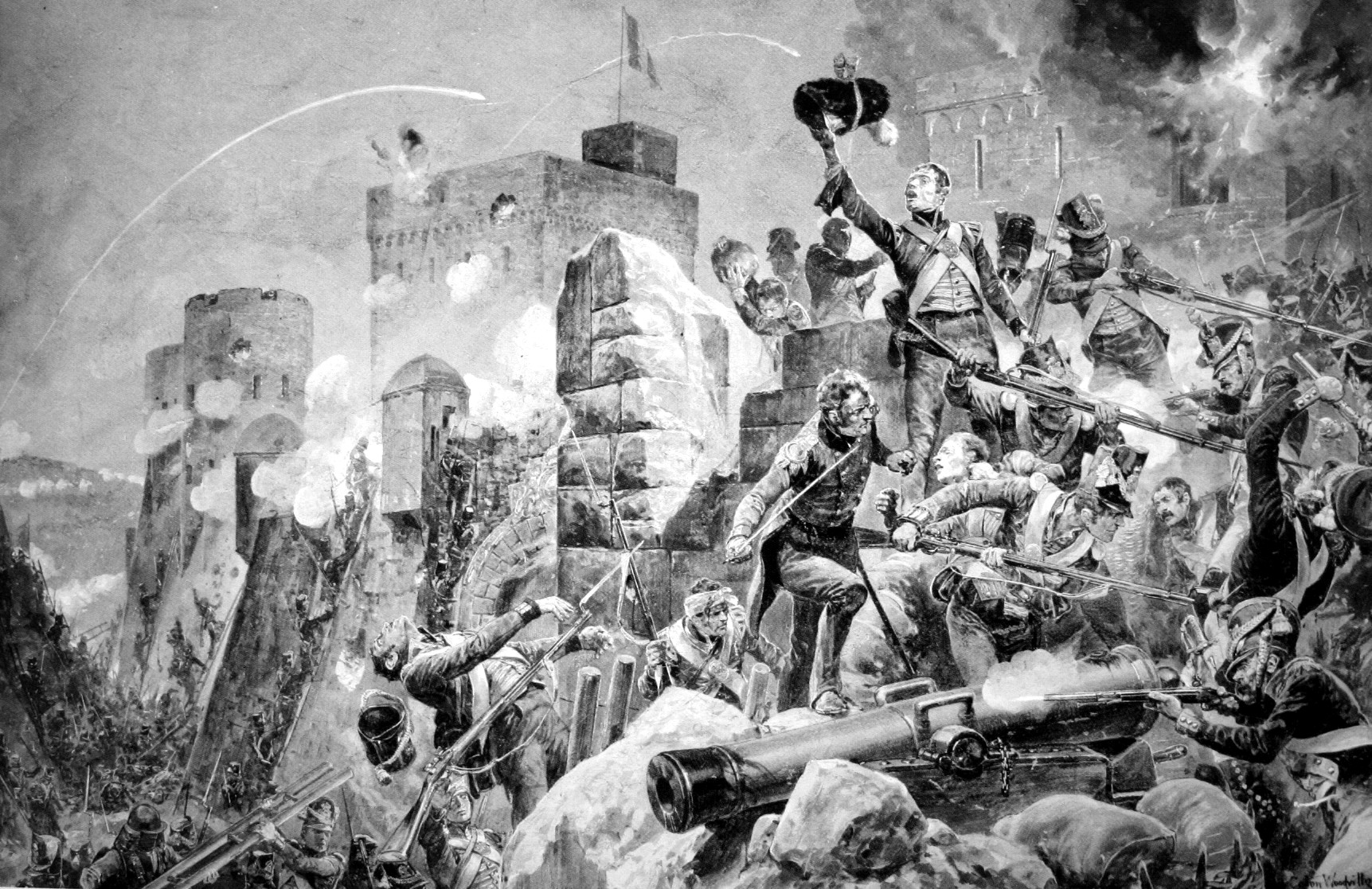
March 16 – April 6: Siege of Badajoz

1812 (MDCCCXII) was a leap year starting on Wednesday of the Gregorian calendar and a leap year starting on Monday of the Julian calendar, the 1812th year of the Common Era (CE) and Anno Domini (AD) designations, the 812th year of the 2nd millennium, the 12th year of the 19th century, and the 3rd year of the 1810s decade. As of the start of 1812, the Gregorian calendar was 12 days ahead of the Julian calendar, which remained in localized use until 1923.

== Events ==
=== January–March ===
- January 1 – The Allgemeines bürgerliches Gesetzbuch (the Austrian civil code) enters into force in the Austrian Empire.
- January 19 – Peninsular War: The French-held fortress of Ciudad Rodrigo is stormed by the Anglo-Portuguese Army, under the Earl of Wellington.
- February 7 – The last New Madrid earthquake strikes New Madrid, Missouri, with an estimated moment magnitude of over 8.
- February 12 – Napoleon I authorizes the usage of Mesures usuelles, the basis of the metric system.
- February 13 – The first Chilean newspaper Aurora de Chile deals with political philosophy, and stands in favor of the new national government.
- February 27
  - Argentine War of Independence: Manuel Belgrano raises the Flag of Argentina (which he designed) in the city of Rosario, for the first time.Luna, Félix (2004). Grandes protagonistas de la Historia Argentina: Manuel Belgrano (in Spanish). Argentina: Grupo Editorial Planeta. p. 77. ISBN 950-49-1247-8.
  - English poet Lord Byron gives his first address as a member of the British House of Lords, in defense of Luddite violence against industrialism, in his home county of Nottinghamshire.
- February 24 – Prussia and France sign the Treaty of Paris, a military alliance.
- March 14 – France and Austria sign the Treaty of Paris.
- March 15 – Luddites attack the wool-processing factory of Frank Vickerman in West Yorkshire.
- March 16–April 6 – Siege of Badajoz (Peninsular War): The Anglo-Portuguese Army, under the Earl of Wellington, besieges Badajoz, Spain and forces the surrender of the French garrison.
- March 19 – The Cortes of Cádiz creates the first modern Spanish constitution.
- March 26

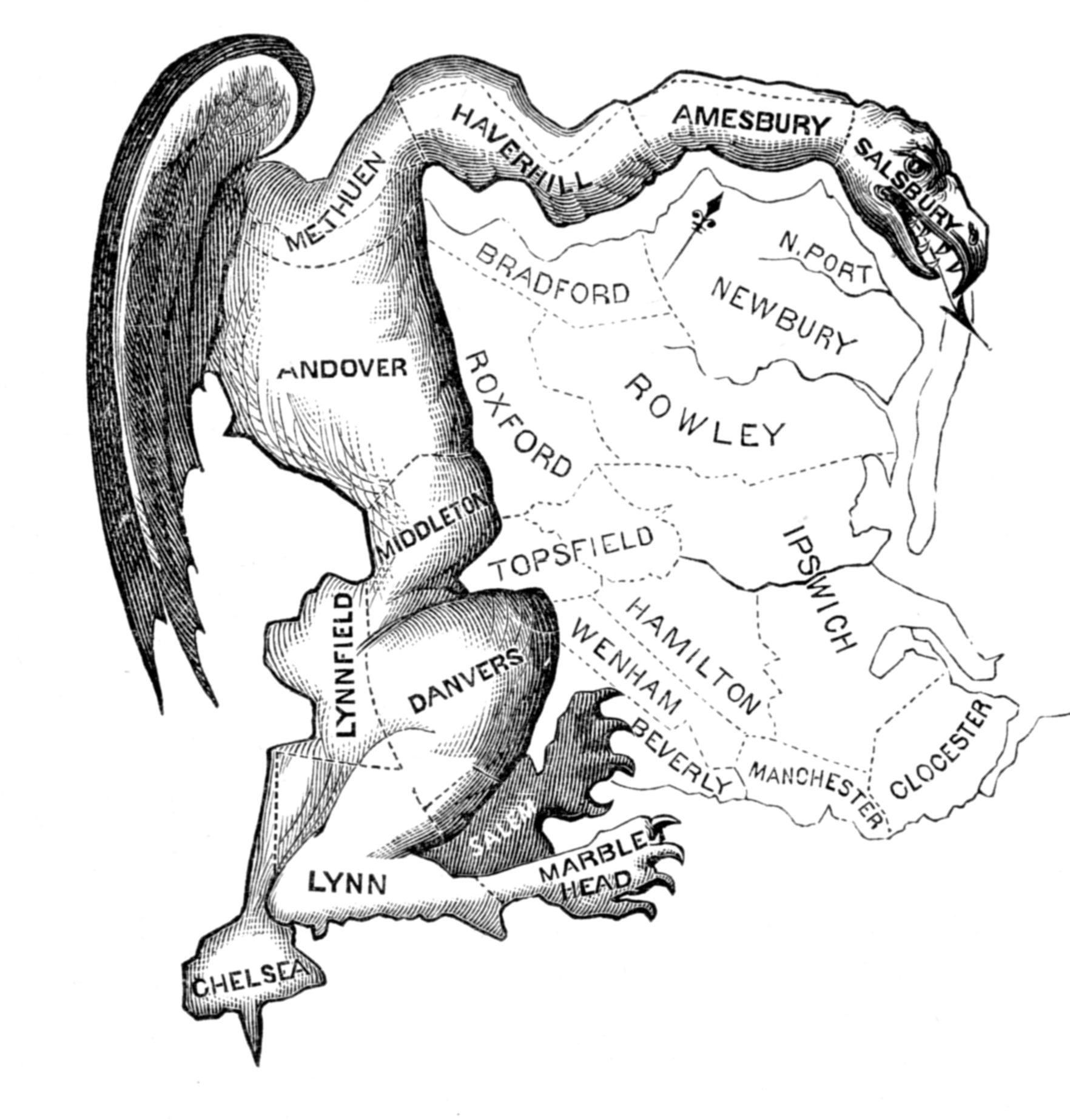
The original Gerrymander

  - In the United States, the Boston Gazette prints a political cartoon coining the term Gerrymander, after former Massachusetts Governor Elbridge Gerry's approval (on February 11) of legislation creating oddly shaped electoral districts, designed to help incumbents win re-election.
  - The 1812 Caracas earthquake destroys Caracas, capital of Venezuela.

=== April–June ===
- April 4 – U.S. President James Madison enacts a 90-day embargo on trade with the United Kingdom.
- April 8 – The capital of Finland is moved from Turku to Helsinki, when Russia's Tsar Alexander I signs an edict moving the Government Council of the Grand Duchy of Finland.
- April 30 – Louisiana is admitted as the 18th U.S. state.
- May 11 – Assassination of Spencer Perceval, the British Prime Minister, by John Bellingham, in the lobby of the British House of Commons in London.
- May 16 – Russian field marshal Mikhail Kutuzov signs the Treaty of Bucharest, ending the Russo-Turkish War (1806–12) and annexing Bessarabia to Imperial Russia.
- May 25 – Felling mine disaster: A mine explosion at the Felling colliery near Jarrow, England, leaves 96 dead.
- June 1 – War of 1812: U.S. President James Madison asks the U.S. Congress to declare war on the United Kingdom.
- June 4 – Following Louisiana's admittance as a U.S. state, the territory previously known by that name is renamed the Missouri Territory.
- June 16 – New York State charters the City Bank of New York (later Citibank).
- June 18 – The United States declaration of war upon the United Kingdom begins the War of 1812 between the U.S., Britain and Canada.
- June 20 – British troops under Robert Rollo Gillespie sack the Yogyakarta Royal Palace.
- June 22 – French declaration of war on Russia.
- June 24 – Napoleon's Grande Armée crosses the Neman River, and invades Russia.

=== July–September ===
- July 12 – Americans invade Canada at Windsor, Ontario.
- July 18 – Russia's Patriotic War – Battle of Klyastitsy: Kulnev defeats Oudinot, but sustains a mortal wound.
- July 19 – Beethoven and Goethe meet each other in Teplice, Bohemia.
- July 22 – Peninsular War – Battle of Salamanca: British forces led by the Earl of Wellington defeat French troops near Salamanca, Spain.
- August 5 – War of 1812: Tecumseh's Indian force ambushes Thomas Van Horne's 200 Americans at Brownstone Creek, causing them to flee and retreat.
- August 12 – Peninsular War: The combined English and Portuguese army under the command of Wellington enters Madrid, following the Battle of Salamanca.
- August 15 – War of 1812 – Battle of Fort Dearborn: Potawatomi warriors overrun the United States fort in Illinois Territory.
- August 16 – War of 1812: American General William Hull surrenders Fort Detroit, without a fight, to the British Army.
- August 16–18 – Battle of Smolensk: The Grande Armée (180,000 men) under Emperor Napoleon I defeats the Russian army on the road to Moscow.
- August 19 – War of 1812: USS Constitution defeats the British frigate Guerriere, off the coast of Nova Scotia. The British shot is said to have bounced off Constitution's sides, earning her the nickname "Old Ironsides".
- August 24 – Siege of Cádiz: Marshal Jean-de-Dieu Soult abandons the two-and-a-half-year siege at Cádiz. He withdraws eastward with his forces to join King Joseph Bonaparte and Louis-Gabriel Suchet in Valencia.
- September 7 – Napoleonic Wars – French invasion of Russia – Battle of Borodino: The bloodiest battle of the Napoleonic Wars so far ends in a tactical victory for Napoleon. There are at least 70,000 casualties, with a minimum of 6,562 dead from the French Grande Armée alone.
- September 14 – French invasion of Russia and Fire of Moscow: Napoleon's troops enter Moscow, which is deliberately set on fire by Muscovites, on orders of Fyodor Rostopchin. Later accounts report that France lost 40,000 troops during four days of fire between September 17 and 20, and that 20,000 Russian soldiers were killed in what would be described in 1876 as "the greatest example in history of national self-sacrifice for the destruction of an invader."

=== October–December ===
- October 9 – War of 1812: American naval forces under Lieutenant Jesse Duncan Elliott capture two British warships, HMS Detroit and HMS Caledonia.
- October 12 – The capital of the U.S. state of Pennsylvania is permanently moved from Lancaster to Harrisburg.
- October 13 – War of 1812 – Battle of Queenston Heights: As part of the Niagara campaign in Ontario, Canada, United States forces under General Stephen Van Rensselaer are repulsed from invading Canada by British and native troops, led by Sir Isaac Brock (who dies during the battle).
- October 18–20 – Second Battle of Polotsk – Russians attack and defeat a Franco-Bavarian force in Belarus.
- October 19 – Napoleon I begins his retreat from Moscow.
- October 21 – Siege of Burgos: British troops under Arthur Wellington are forced to abandon the siege of Burgos after a month. Meanwhile, Joseph Bonaparte makes plans to recapture Madrid. He assembles an army led by Louis-Gabriel Suchet and Jean-de-Dieu Soult to drive Wellington out of central Spain.
- October 23 – Malet coup of 1812: General Claude François de Malet attempts unsuccessfully to overthrow the Napoleonic régime in Paris.
- October 24 – Napoleonic Wars – Battle of Maloyaroslavets: An inconclusive encounter between the French vanguard and a Russian force leads Napoleon to decide to retreat along the same line as his advance, with disastrous results.
- November 3 – Napoleonic Wars – Battle of Vyazma: The rearguard of Napoleon's retreating army is defeated.
- November 5 – 1812 United States presidential election: James Madison defeats DeWitt Clinton.
- November 10 – 1812 United Kingdom general election: The Tory Party is victorious, under Robert Jenkinson, 2nd Earl of Liverpool.
- November 15–18 – Napoleonic Wars – Battle of Krasnoi: Napoleon's retreating army is again defeated in a series of skirmishes.
- December 8 – The M6.9–7.5 San Juan Capistrano earthquake affects Alta California with a maximum Mercalli intensity of VII (Very strong) to IX (Violent), killing 40 parishioners at Mission San Juan Capistrano.
- December 14 – The French invasion of Russia comes to an end as the remnants of the Grande Armée are expelled from Russia.
- December 18 – The first Spanish Christmas Lottery is drawn, in Cádiz; it will be continuing more than two centuries later. The first Lotería Nacional was drawn on March 4.
- December 20 – The first volume of Grimms' Fairy Tales is published in Germany.
- December 21 – The Ventura earthquake hits Alta California 13 days after the San Juan Capistrano earthquake but only one person is killed.
- December 29 – War of 1812: USS Constitution defeats the British frigate HMS Java, off the coast of Brazil.
- December 30 – The Convention of Tauroggen is signed.

=== Date unknown ===
- The Bishop James Madison Society is founded at the College of William & Mary, Williamsburg, Virginia.
- The Woodford Reserve Bourbon whiskey distillery, established in 1780 along Glenn's Creek in Woodford County, Kentucky, passes to the control of Oscar Pepper.
- The Ranikot Fort is reconstructed in Sindh.
- Approximate date – Battle of Shela: The people of Lamu Island are victorious against those from other parts of the Kenya coast.

== Births ==
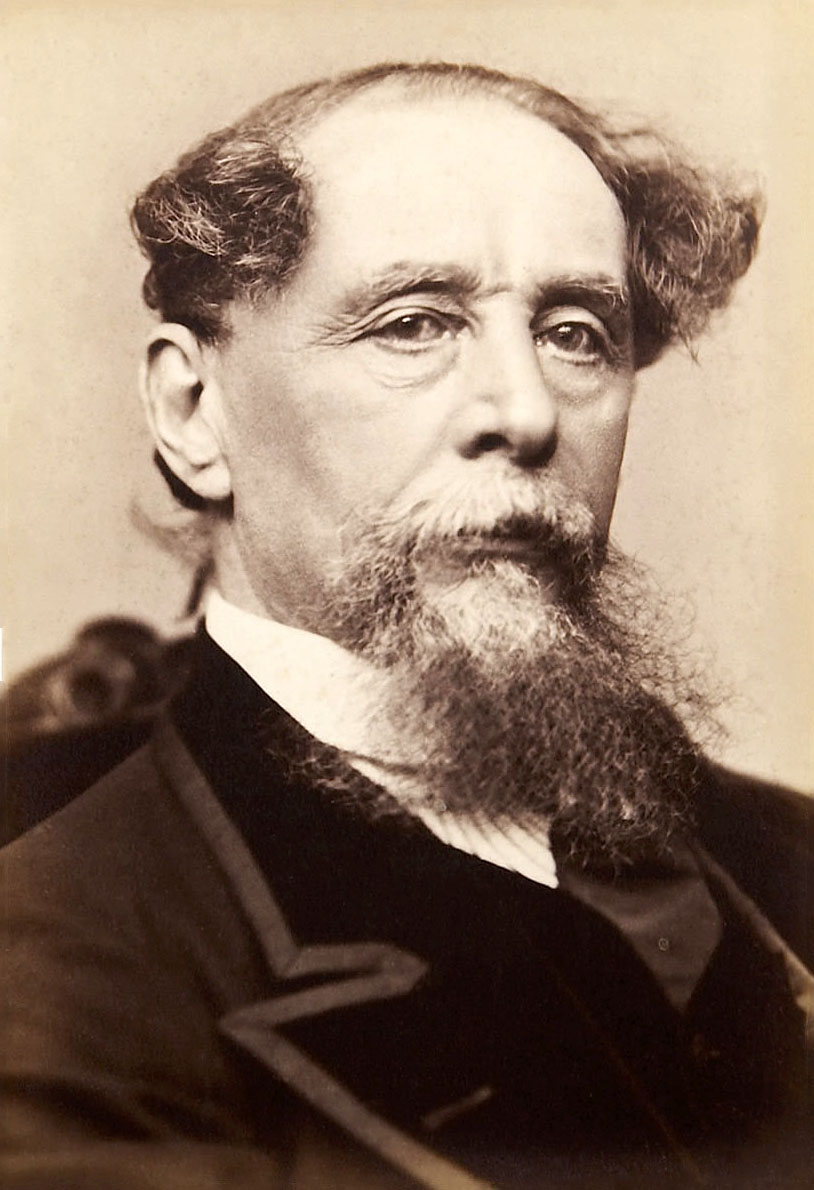
Charles Dickens

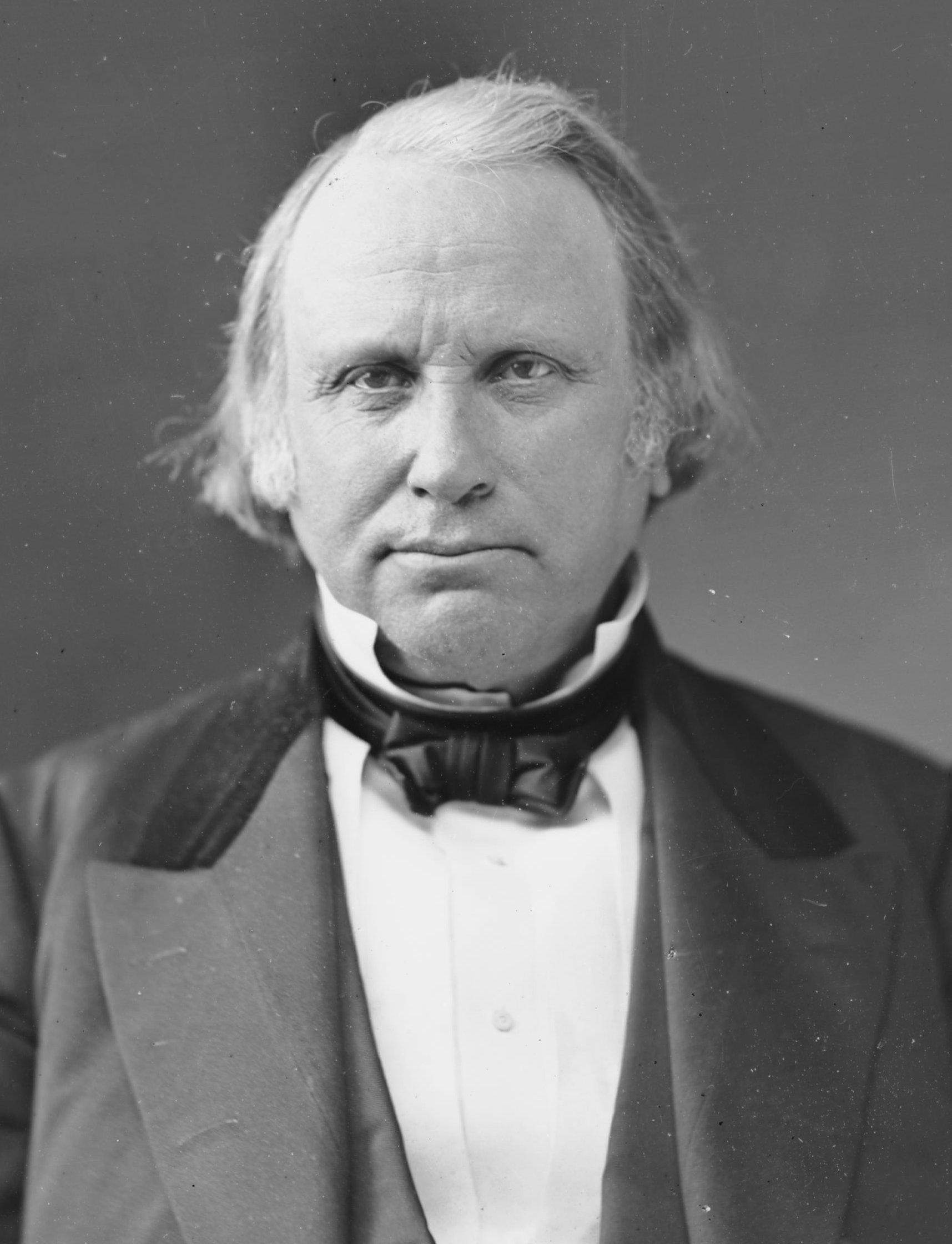
Henry Wilson

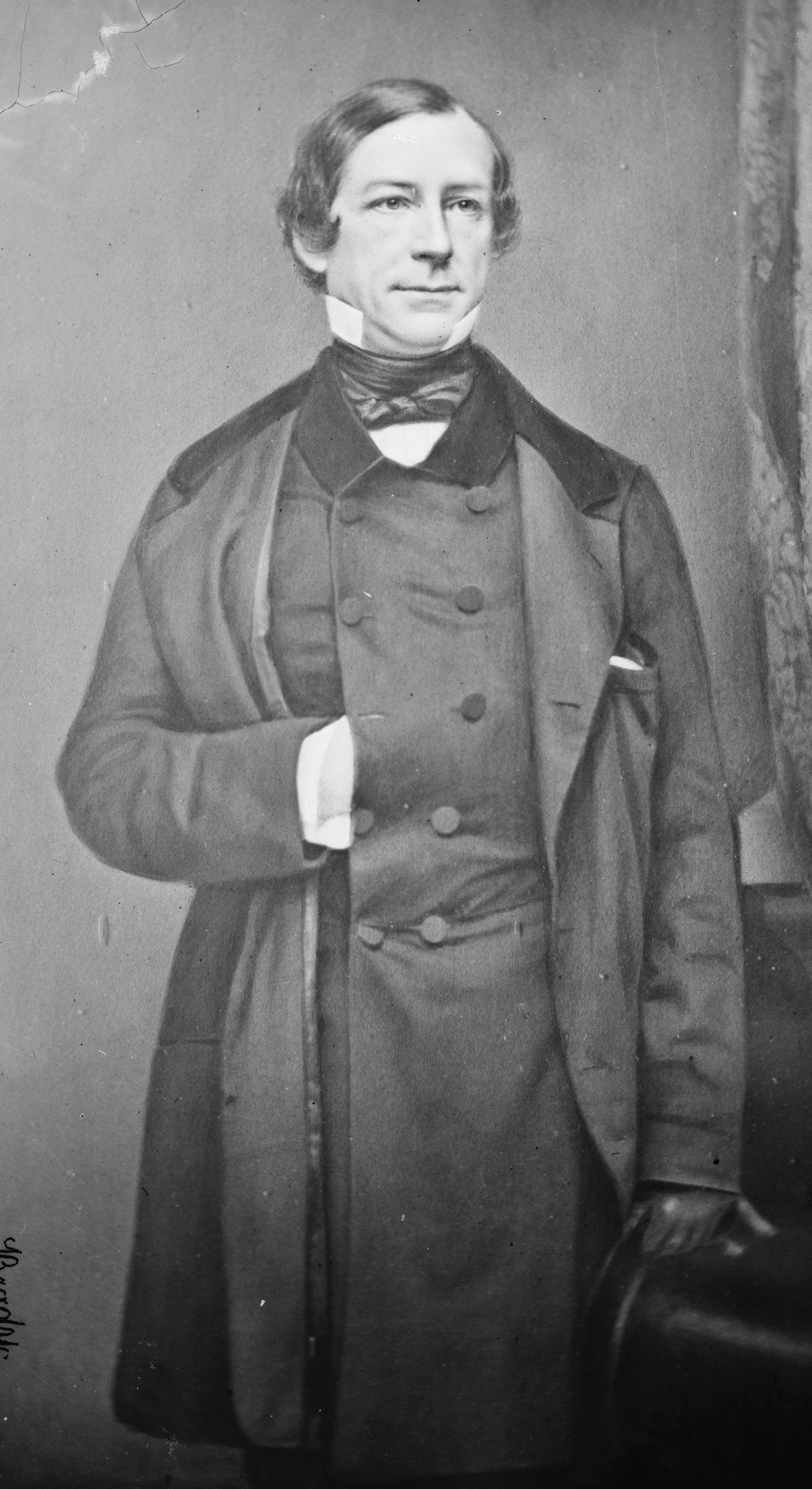
Fernando Wood

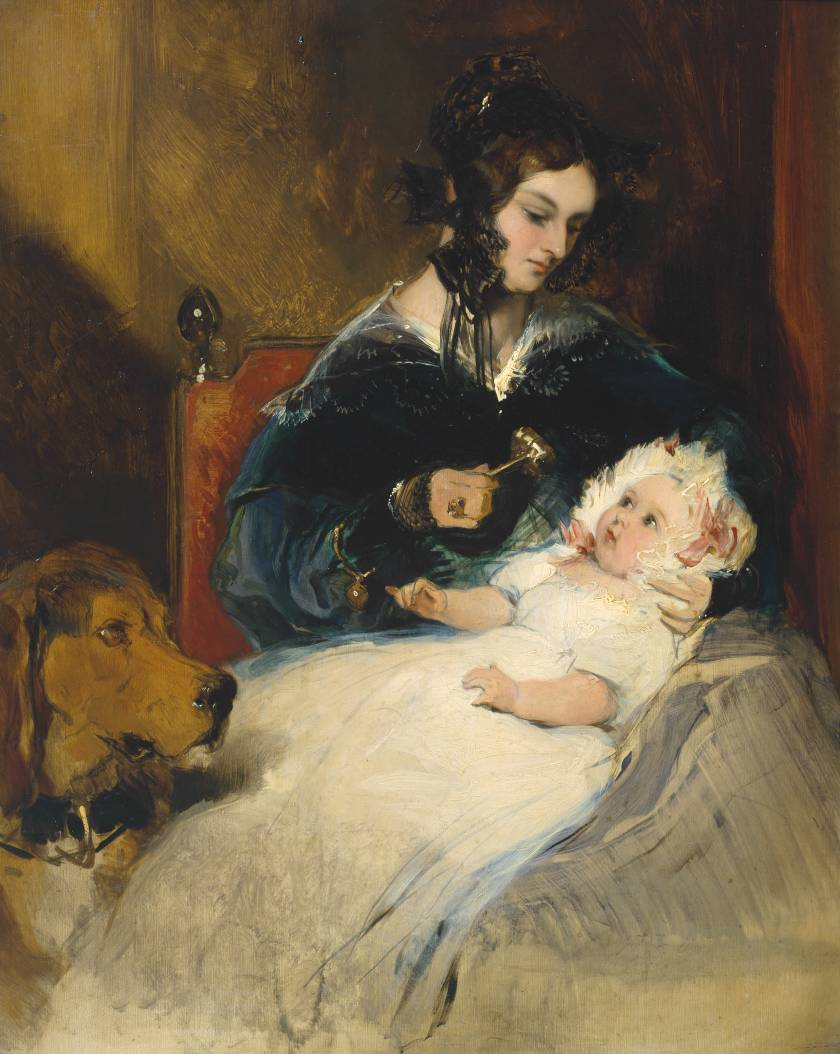
Louisa Hamilton, Duchess of Abercorn

- January 6 – Melchora Aquino, Filipino revolutionary hero (d. 1919)
- January 13 – Victor de Laprade, French poet, critic (d. 1883)
- February 3 – William Fraser Tolmie, Scottish-Canadian scientist, politician (d. 1886)
- February 7 – Charles Dickens, English novelist (d. 1870)
- February 11 – Alexander Hamilton Stephens, Vice President of the Confederate States of America (d. 1883)
- February 15 – Charles Lewis Tiffany, American jeweler, co-founder of Tiffany & Co. (d. 1902)
- February 18 – Nils Johan Berlin, Swedish chemist, professor (d. 1891)
- February 29 – Sir James Milne Wilson, Premier of Tasmania (d. 1880)
- March 1
  - Nicolae Kretzulescu, 2-time prime minister of Romania (d. 1900)
  - Augustus Pugin, English-born architect (d. 1852)
- March 6 – Aaron Lufkin Dennison, American watch manufacturer (d. 1895)
- March 22 – Stephen Pearl Andrews, American anarchist, abolitionist (d. 1886)
- March 27 – William Robinson (Canadian architect), Canadian architect and land surveyor (died 1894)
- April 14 – George Grey, Portuguese-born British colonial governor, 11th Premier of New Zealand (d. 1898)
- April 16 – Juraj Dobrila, Croatian bishop and national revivalist (d. 1882)
- April 20 – Pauline Åhman, Swedish harpist (d. 1904)
- April 22 – Solomon Caesar Malan, Genevan orientalist (d. 1894)
- April 23 – Frederick Whitaker, English-New Zealand lawyer, politician, 5th Prime Minister of New Zealand (d. 1891)
- April 27
  - Friedrich von Flotow, German composer (d. 1883)
  - William W. Snow, American politician (d. 1886)
- April 29 – Emilie Högquist, Swedish dramatic star (d. 1846)
- May 6 – Madame Restell, American abortion provider (d. 1878)
- May 7 – Robert Browning, English poet (d. 1889)
- May 12 – Edward Lear, English artist, nonsense poet (d. 1888)
- May 27 – George K. Teulon, English-Texian journalist and freemason (d. 1846)
- June 9 – Johann Gottfried Galle, German astronomer (d. 1910)
- June 13 – Gustavus H. Scott, American admiral (d. 1882)
- June 14 – Fernando Wood, American politician (d. 1881)
- July 2 – Nathaniel de Rothschild, French wine grower (d. 1870)
- July 3 – Selina Jenkinson, British aristocrat (d. 1883)
- July 8 – Louisa Hamilton, Duchess of Abercorn (d. 1905)
- July 31 – Amélie of Leuchtenberg, Empress consort of Brazil (d. 1873)
- August 8 – John Rodgers, American admiral (d. 1882)
- August 25
  - Percival Drayton, United States Navy officer (d. 1865)
  - Nikolay Zinin, Russian organic chemist (d. 1880)
- August 27 – Bertalan Szemere, 3rd Prime Minister of Hungary (d. 1869)
- September 2 – William Fox, 2nd Premier of New Zealand (d. 1893)
- September 18 – Herschel Vespasian Johnson, American politician (d. 1880)
- October 12 – Ascanio Sobrero, Italian chemist (d. 1888)
- October 20 – Austin Flint I, American cardiologist (d. 1886)
- November 14 – Aleardo Aleardi, Italian poet (d. 1878)
- November 19 – Edmond Jurien de La Gravière, French admiral, naval historian, and biographer (d. 1892)
- December 6 – Ana María Martínez de Nisser, Colombian heroine and writer (d. 1872)
- December 8 – Henry Varnum Poor, American financial analyst (d. 1905)
- December 14 – Charles Canning, 1st Earl Canning, British Viceroy of India (d. 1862)
- December 17 – Vilhelm Petersen, Danish painter (d. 1880)
- December 24 – Karl Eduard Zachariae von Lingenthal, German jurist (d. 1894)

== Deaths ==
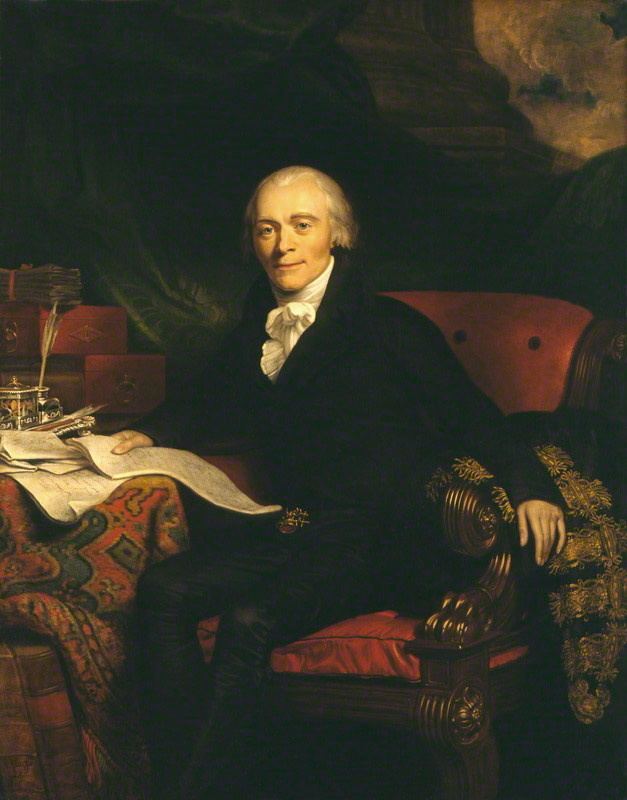
Spencer Perceval

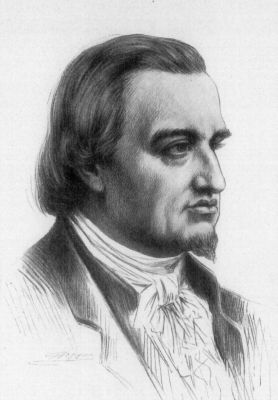
Mayer Amschel Rothschild

- January 23 – Robert Craufurd, British general (mortally wounded in battle) (b. 1764)
- February 2 – Isaac Titsingh, Dutch scholar, merchant-trader and ambassador (b. 1745)
- March 7 – Isaac Swainson, English botanist (b. 1746)
- March 11 – Philip James de Loutherbourg, English artist (b. 1740)
- April 14 – William Nicholas (officer), English army officer, at the Siege of Badajoz (b. 1785)
- April 15 – Michael Atkins, Irish actor and theatre manager (b. 1746)
- April 20 – George Clinton, 4th Vice President of the United States (b. 1739)
- April 25 – Edmond Malone, Irish scholar (b. 1741)
- May 11 – Spencer Perceval, Prime Minister of the United Kingdom (assassinated) (b. 1762)
- May 12
  - Martha Ballard, American diarist and midwife (b. 1734 or 1735)
  - Charles Sturt, English politician (b. 1763)
- May 18 – John Bellingham, British assassin of Spencer Perceval (b. 1769)
- May 27 – Manuela Gandarillas, Bolivian freedom fighter (born c. 1740s)
- July 4 – Victurnien-Jean-Baptiste de Rochechouart de Mortemart, French general and politician (b. 1752)
- August 1 – Yakov Kulnev, Russian military leader (b. 1763).
- August 12 – Anna Strong, Patriot spy during the American Revolutionary War (b. 1740)
- August 30 – George Mathews, American army officer and politician (b. 1739)
- September 2 – Cornélie Lebon (née de Brambilla), Belgian born French engineer (b. 1769)
- September 13 – Leonardo Bravo, Mexican general who fought in the Mexican War of Independence, father of Nicolas Bravo, executed (b. 1764)
- September 19
  - Auguste-Jean-Gabriel de Caulaincourt, French general (b. 1777)
  - Mayer Amschel Rothschild, German banker (b. 1744)
- September 21 – Emanuel Schikaneder, German dramatist, actor and singer (b. 1751)
- September 24
  - Pyotr Bagration, Russian general and prince of Georgian origin (b. 1765)
  - Juana Galán, Spanish heroine (b. 1787)
- October 13 – Isaac Brock, British general (killed in action) (b. 1769)
- December 15 – Schneur Zalman, Polish rabbi and founder of the Chabad-Lubavitch movement (b. 1745)
- December 20 – Sacagawea, Shoshone guide (b. ca. 1788)
- December 24 – George Beck, American artist and poet (b. 1749)
