= Declaration of war =

Formal act by which one state announces war against another

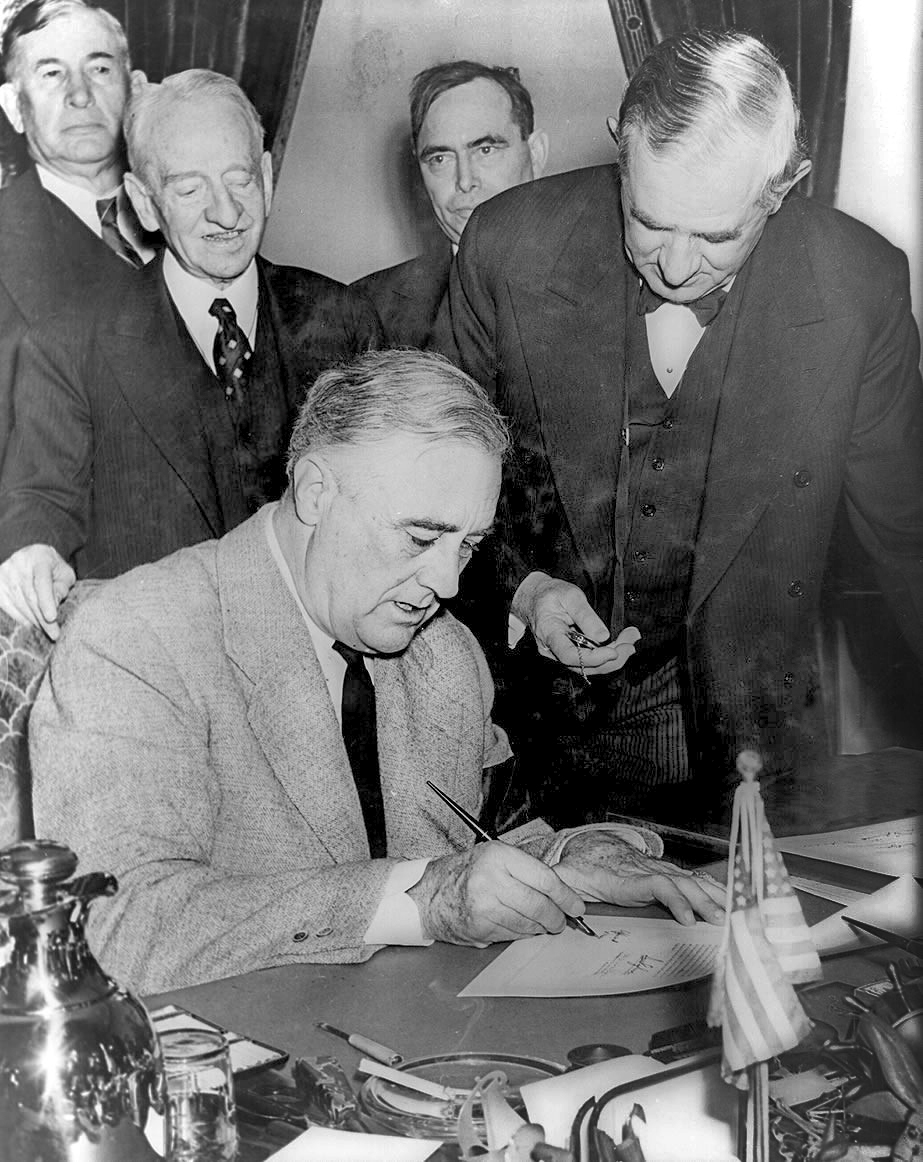
US President Franklin D. Roosevelt signs a declaration of war against Nazi Germany on 11 December 1941.

A declaration of war is a formal act by which one state announces existing or impending war activity against another. The declaration is a performative speech act (or the public signing of a document) by an authorized party of a national government, in order to create a state of war between two or more states.

The legality of who is competent to declare war varies between nations and forms of government. In many nations, that power is given to the head of state or sovereign. In other cases, something short of a full declaration of war, such as a letter of marque or a covert operation, may authorise war-like acts by privateers or mercenaries. The official international protocol for declaring war was defined in the Hague Convention (III) of 1907 on the Opening of Hostilities.

Since 1945, developments in international law such as the United Nations Charter, which prohibits both the threat and the use of force in international conflicts, have made declarations of war largely obsolete in international relations, though such declarations may have relevance within the domestic law of the belligerents or of neutral nations. The UN Security Council, under powers granted in articles 24 and 25, and Chapter VII of the Charter, may authorize collective action to maintain or enforce international peace and security. Article 51 of the United Nations Charter also states that: "Nothing in the present Charter shall impair the inherent right to individual or collective self-defence if an armed attack occurs against a state."

Declarations of war have been exceedingly rare since the end of World War II. Scholars have debated the causes of the decline, with some arguing that states are trying to evade the restrictions of international humanitarian law (which governs conduct in war) while others argue that war declarations have come to be perceived as markers of aggression and maximalist aims.

== History ==
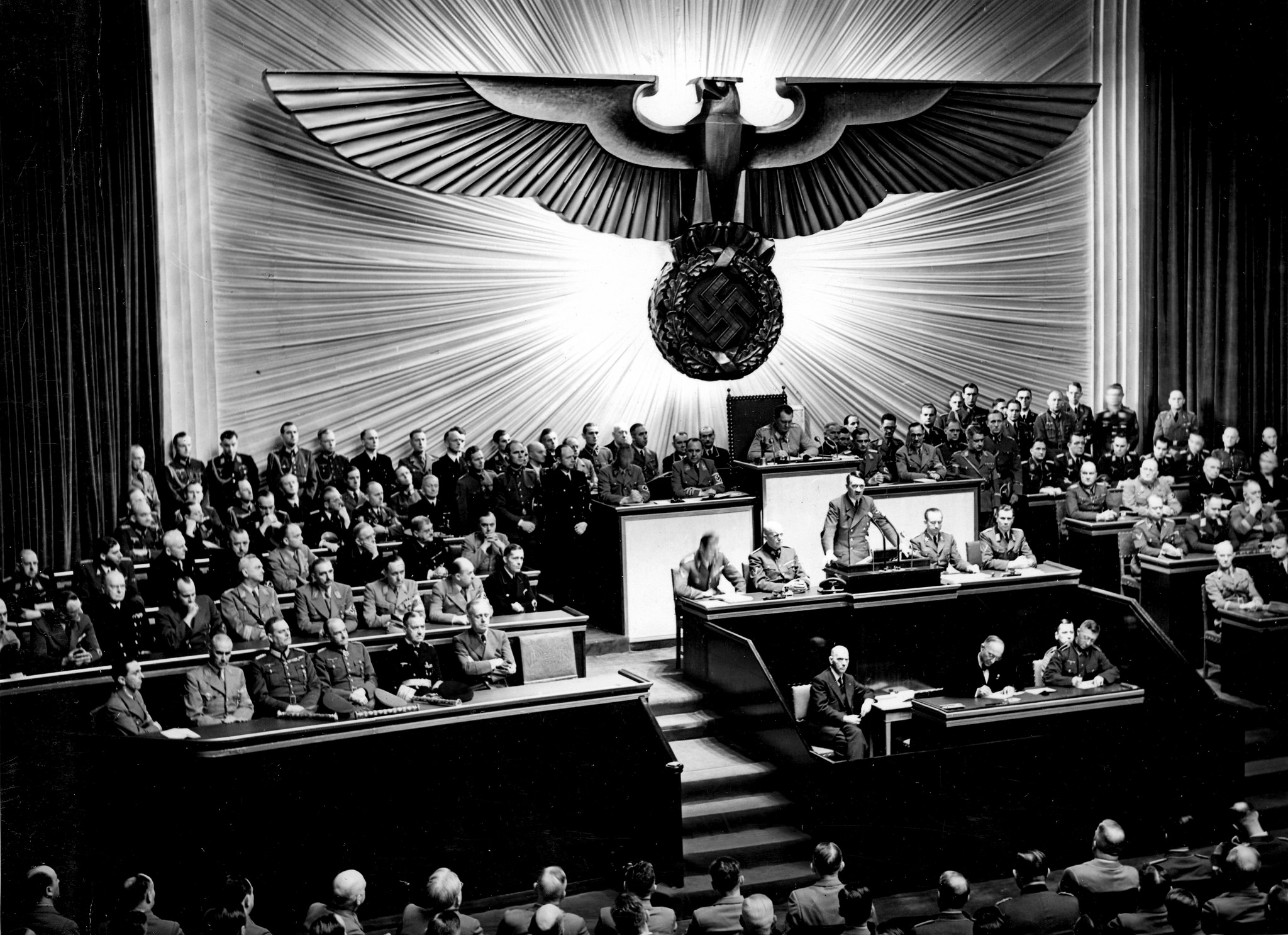
Adolf Hitler announcing the German declaration of war against the United States on 11 December 1941.

The practice of declaring war has a long history. The ancient Sumerian Epic of Gilgamesh gives an account of it, as does the Old Testament. The Roman Republic formalized the declaration of war by a special ceremony, the ritual of the Fetials, though the practice started to decline into the Imperial era.

However, the practice of declaring war was not always strictly followed. In his study Hostilities without Declaration of War (1883), the British scholar John Frederick Maurice showed that between 1700 and 1870 war was declared in only 10 cases, e.g. the 1812 French declaration of war on Russia or the Declarations of war by Great Britain and the United Kingdom, while in another 107 cases war was waged without such declaration (these figures include only wars waged in Europe and between European states and the United States, not including colonial wars in Africa and Asia).

In modern public international law, a declaration of war entails the recognition between countries of a state of hostilities between these countries, and such declaration has acted to regulate the conduct between the military engagements between the forces of the respective countries. The primary multilateral treaties governing such declarations are the Hague Conventions.

The League of Nations, formed in 1919 in the wake of the First World War, and the General Treaty for the Renunciation of War of 1928 signed in Paris, France, demonstrated that world powers were seriously seeking a means to prevent the carnage of another world war. Nevertheless, these powers were unable to stop the outbreak of the Second World War, so the United Nations was established following that war in a renewed attempt to prevent international aggression through declarations of war.

=== Denigration of formal declarations of war before WWI ===
In classical times, Thucydides condemned the Thebans, allies of Sparta, for launching a surprise attack without a declaration of war against Plataea, Athens' ally – an event that began the Peloponnesian War.

The utility of formal declarations of war has always been questioned, either as sentimental remnants of a long-gone age of chivalry or as imprudent warnings to the enemy. For example, writing in 1737, Cornelius van Bynkershoek judged that "nations and princes endowed with some pride are not generally willing to wage war without a previous declaration, for they wish by an open attack to render victory more honourable and glorious." Writing in 1880, William Edward Hall judged that "any sort of previous declaration therefore is an empty formality unless the enemy must be given time and opportunity to put himself in a state of defence, and it is needless to say that no one asserts such a quixotism to be obligatory."

=== Declared wars since 1945 ===
Declarations of war, while uncommon in the traditional sense, have mainly been limited to the conflict areas of the Western Asia and East Africa since 1945. Additionally, some small states have unilaterally declared war on major world powers such as the United States or Russia when faced with a hostile invasion and/or occupation. The following is a list of declarations of war (or the existence of war) by one sovereign state against another since the end of World War II in 1945. Only declarations that occurred in the context of a direct military conflict are included.

War(s)	Date	Titled	Belligerents		Ended	References
War(s)	Date	Titled	Declaring party	Opponent	Ended	References
Arab–Israeli War (1948–49); Suez Crisis (1956); Six-Day War (1967); War of Attrition (1967–70); Yom Kippur War (1973)	15 May 1948	Declaration of war	(Kingdom of Egypt) Egypt	Israel	26 March 1979	
Arab–Israeli War (1948–49); Suez Crisis (1956); Six-Day War (1967); War of Attrition (1967–70); Yom Kippur War (1973)	15 May 1948	Declaration of war	Jordan	Israel	26 October 1994	
Arab–Israeli War (1948–49); Suez Crisis (1956); Six-Day War (1967); War of Attrition (1967–70); Yom Kippur War (1973)	15 May 1948	Declaration of war	Syria, (Kingdom of Iraq) Iraq, Lebanon	Israel	Still technically at war	
India–Pakistan war of 1965	6 September 1965	Existence of a state of war	India	Pakistan	23 September 1965	
Six-Day War (1967)	June 1967	Existence of a state of war	Mauritania	Israel	1991	
India–Pakistan war of 1971	23 November 1971	Existence of a state of war	Pakistan	India	16 December 1971	
Uganda–Tanzania War	2 November 1978	Declaration of war	Tanzania	Uganda	3 June 1979	
Iran–Iraq War	22 September 1980	Declaration of war	Iraq	Iran	20 July 1988	
United States invasion of Panama	15 December 1989	Existence of a state of war	Panama	United States	31 January 1990	
Eritrean–Ethiopian War	14 May 1998	Existence of a state of war	Ethiopia	Eritrea	12 December 2000	
NATO intervention in Kosovo	24 March 1999	Existence of a state of war	Yugoslavia	NATO	25 June 1999	
Chadian Civil War	23 December 2005	Existence of a state of war	Chad	Sudan	15 January 2010	
Djiboutian–Eritrean border conflict	13 June 2008	Existence of a state of war	Djibouti	Eritrea	6 June 2010	
Russo-Georgian War	9 August 2008	Existence of a state of war	Georgia	Russia	16 August 2008	
Heglig Crisis	11 April 2012	Existence of a state of war	Sudan	South Sudan	26 May 2012	
Korean conflict (Frozen)	30 March 2013	Existence of a state of war	North Korea	South Korea	Still technically at war	
2014 Armenian–Azerbaijani clashes	08 August 2014	Existence of a state of war	Azerbaijan	Armenia		
Second Nagorno-Karabakh War	27 September 2020	Existence of a state of war	Azerbaijan	Armenia	10 November 2020	
Second Western Sahara War	14 November 2020	Declaration of war	SADR	Morocco	Still at war	
Gaza war	7 October 2023	Existence of a state of war	Israel	Hamas	Still at war	

=== Other unique cases ===
==== Russo-Ukrainian War ====
No formal declaration of war has been issued in the ongoing Russo-Ukrainian War. At the beginning of the Russian invasion of Ukraine, Putin gave a televised broadcast announcing the start of the invasion with the term "special military operation", side-stepping a formal declaration of war. The statement was, however, regarded as a declaration of war by the Ukrainian government and reported as such by many international news sources. While the Ukrainian parliament refers to Russia as a "terrorist state" in regards to its military actions in Ukraine, it has not issued a formal declaration of war on its behalf.

== Procedures ==
In Title II, Article 2 of the first Hague Convention of 1899, the signatory states agreed that at least one other nation be used to mediate disputes between states before engaging in hostilities:

In case of serious disagreement or conflict, before an appeal to arms, the signatory Powers agree to have recourse, as far as circumstances allow, to the good offices or mediation of one or more friendly Powers.

The Hague Convention (III) of 1907 called "Convention Relative to the Opening of Hostilities" gives the international actions a country should perform when opening hostilities. The first two Articles say:

Article 1

The Contracting Powers recognize that hostilities between themselves must not commence without previous and explicit warning, in the form either of a reasoned declaration of war or of an ultimatum with conditional declaration of war.

Article 2

The existence of a state of war must be notified to the neutral Powers without delay, and shall not take effect in regard to them until after the receipt of a notification, which may, however, be given by telegraph. Neutral Powers, nevertheless, cannot rely on the absence of notification if it is clearly established that they were in fact aware of the existence of a state of war.

=== The United Nations and war ===
In an effort to force nations to resolve issues without warfare, framers of the United Nations Charter attempted to commit member nations to using warfare only under limited circumstances, particularly for defensive purposes.

The UN became a combatant itself after North Korea invaded South Korea on 25 June 1950, which began the Korean War. The UN Security Council condemned the North Korean action by a 9–0 resolution (with the Soviet Union absent) and called upon its member nations to come to the aid of South Korea. The United States and 15 other nations formed a "UN force" to pursue this action. In a press conference on 29 June 1950, US President Harry S. Truman characterized these hostilities as not being a "war" but a "police action".

The United Nations has issued Security Council Resolutions that declared some wars to be legal actions under international law, most notably Resolution 678, authorizing the 1991 Gulf War which was triggered by Iraq's invasion of Kuwait. UN Resolutions authorise the use of "force" or "all necessary means".

== Legality ==
The legality of who is competent to declare war varies between nations and forms of government. In many nations, that power is given to the head of state or sovereign. The official international protocol for declaring war was defined in the Hague Convention (III) of 1907 on the Opening of Hostilities.

Since 1945, developments in international law such as the United Nations Charter, which prohibits both the threat and the use of force in international conflicts, have made declarations of war largely obsolete in international relations, though such declarations may have relevance within the domestic law of the belligerents or of neutral nations. The UN Security Council, under powers granted in articles 24 and 25, and Chapter VII of the Charter, may authorize collective action to maintain or enforce international peace and security. Article 51 of the United Nations Charter also states that: "Nothing in the present Charter shall impair the inherent right to individual or collective self-defence if an armed attack occurs against a state."

== Requirements by country ==
Declaring war is usually done through a process that involves prior approval before a formal announcement is made. This differs by country as some do not have a formal or codified pre-approval process, and in such a case, a given head of government can declare war with no pre-conditions.

Country	War declarer	Legal cause	Authorized by	Additional information
Australia	Governor-General	Section 61 and 68 of the Australian constitution	Governor-General (Note: While the constitution dictates that executive power is vested in the Governor General as the Monarchs representative, they act on the advice of ministers of the Australian Government who hold the de facto ability to declare war.) (de jure) Government (de facto)	Per the Australian Constitution executive powers relating to defence are vested in the Governor General as the representative of the Monarch of Australia, including the power to formally proclaim a state of war, which has only been used during World War 2, in contemporary day to day practice the deployment of forces and military action against hostile powers is the responsibility of the Prime Minister and Ministers under the Defence Act 1903 and other related acts.
Austria	Parliament	Article 38 and 40 of B-VG	Parliament	The President has to announce a declaration of war.
Belgium	Monarch	Article 167 of the Belgian Constitution	Monarch	
Brazil	President	Article 84 of the Brazilian constitution	Congress	The President of Brazil has the power to declare war, in the event of foreign aggression, when authorized by the National Congress or, upon its ratification if the aggression occurs between legislative sessions, and decree full or partial national mobilization under the same conditions.
Canada	Monarch	None	Monarch (de jure) (Note: While declaring war does not require the direct approval from the Parliament of Canada, such can be sought by the government.)	See: Declaration of war by Canada.
China	President	Article 62(15), 67(19) and 80	Congress (de jure) (Note: The NPC has been described as a rubber stamp legislature.)	The National People's Congress is vested with the power to decide "on issues concerning war and peace" while the President "in pursuance of the decisions of the National People's Congress...proclaims a state of war." The Standing Committee of the National People's Congress may "decide, when the National People's Congress is not in session, on the proclamation of a state of war in the event of an armed attack on the country or in fulfillment of international treaty obligations concerning common defense against aggression".
Finland	President	Article 93 of the Finnish constitution	Parliament	The President of Finland may declare war or peace, with permission from the Parliament of Finland.
France	Government	Article 35 of the French constitution	Parliament	The Parliament "authorize" the declaration of war.
Germany	Parliament	Article 115a GG	Parliament	A necessary requirement is a determination by a two-thirds majority in the lower house and a majority in the upper house that Germany is under armed attack or that such an attack is imminent. Exceptions apply if the bodies are unable to meet. If such a determination is made, the president may issue declarations relating to international law with the consent of the lower house.
Hungary	National Assembly	Article 1 of the Fundamental Law of Hungary	National Assembly	The National Assembly "shall decide to declare a state of war and to conclude peace".
India	President	Article 53(2) of the Constitution of India	Parliament	The president of India can declare war or conclude peace, subject to the approval of parliament and advice from select government officials.
Israel	Prime Minister	The Knesset: Article 40(a) and The Government: Article 3(a) of the Basic Laws of Israel	Prime Minister	Per article 40(a) of the Basic Law The Knesset, the state will declare war "pursuant to a government decision" with the prime minister to give notice to the Knesset "as soon as possible." Per article 3(a) of the Basic Law The Government, "the Government is comprised of the Prime Minister and Ministers."
Italy	President	Articles 78 and 87 of the Constitution of Italy	Parliament	The President shall make declarations of war as have been agreed by Parliament. Parliament has the authority to declare a state of war and vest the necessary powers into the Government.
Kuwait	Monarch	Article 68 of the Constitution of Kuwait	Monarch	The Emir declares defensive war by decree. Offensive war is prohibited.
Mexico	President	Article 89 § VIII of the Mexican Constitution	Congress	The President may declare war in the name of the United Mexican States after the correspondent law is enacted by the Congress of the Union.
Netherlands	States General	Article 96 of the Constitution of the Netherlands	States General	Majority vote in the state general is required, unless an act of war prevents the states general to convene.
New Zealand	Monarch	None	Governor-General	
Pakistan	President	Article 232 of the Constitution of Pakistan	President	Article 232 of the Constitution authorizes the President to issue a Proclamation of Emergency on account of war or external aggression, acting on the binding advice of the Prime Minister (Article 48).
Philippines	Congress	Article 6, Section 23 of the Constitution of the Philippines	President	Requires a two-thirds vote in a joint session of Congress, with each chamber voting separately.
Poland	Parliament	Article 116 of the Constitution of Poland	Parliament	If the Sejm cannot assemble for a sitting, the President of the Republic may declare a state of war.
Qatar	Monarch	Article 71 of the Constitution of Qatar	Monarch	Defensive war shall be declared by an Emiri decree and aggressive war is prohibited.
Russia	President	Article 71 and 86 of the Constitution of Russia	President	Per Article 71: "The jurisdiction of the Russian Federation includes [...] foreign policy and international relations of the Russian Federation, international treaties and agreements of the Russian Federation, issues of war and peace;" Per Article 86:a "The President of the Russian Federation shall: [...] govern the foreign policy of the Russian Federation;"
Saudi Arabia	Monarch	Article 61 of the Basic Law of Saudi Arabia	Monarch	
Serbia	National Assembly	Article 99 and 201 of the Constitution of Serbia	National Assembly	When the National Assembly is not in a position to convene, the decision on proclamation of the state of war shall be passed by the President of the Republic together with the President of the National Assembly and the Prime Minister.
Spain	Monarch	Article 63 of the Spanish constitution of 1978	Parliament	The King, with prior authorization by the Parliament, has the power to declare war and make peace.
Sweden	Cabinet	Section 15 § 14 entitled "Krigsförklaring" (2010:1408) of the Instrument of Government	Parliament	The Swedish cabinet (regeringen) may not declare Sweden to be at war without the parliament's (riksdagen) consent unless Sweden is attacked first.
Syria	President	Article 41 of the Constitutional Declaration	National Security Council	Article 41 states: "The President of the Republic declares general mobilization and war after the approval of the National Security Council."
Turkey	Parliament	Article 87 and 92 of the Constitution of Turkey	Parliament	The President may declare Turkey to be at war without the parliament's consent if the parliament is adjourned or in recess and Turkey is attacked first.
Ukraine	Parliament	Article 85 and 106 of the Constitution of Ukraine	President	
United Kingdom	Monarch	None	Monarch	See: Declarations of war by Great Britain and the United Kingdom.
United States	Congress	Article 1, Section 8 of the Constitution of the United States	President	See: Declaration of war by the United States.

== See also ==
- Ongoing wars (mostly undeclared)
- Frozen conflict
- List of wars extended by diplomatic irregularity
- Letter of protest
- State of emergency
- Undeclared war
- Feud letter
