= 1812 French declaration of war on Russia =

Beginning of Napoleon's invasion of Russia

French declaration of war on Russia
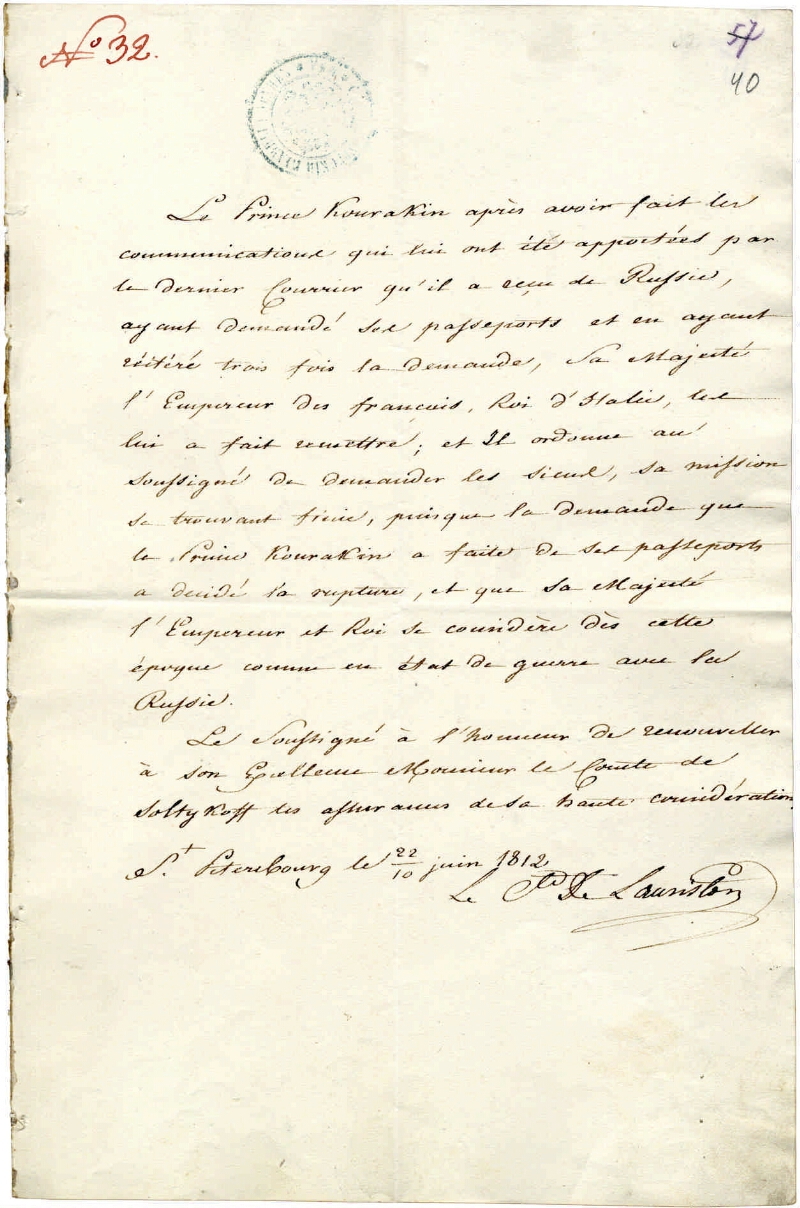
- The declaration of war
- Created: 22 June 1812
- Date effective: 22 June 1812
- Location: Archive of Foreign Policy of the Russian Empire, Moscow
- Commissioned by: Napoleon
- Author: Jacques Lauriston
- Signatories: Jacques Lauriston
- Media type: Manuscript
- Subject: France–Russia relations and the declaration of war

The First French Empire declared war on the Russian Empire on 22 June [O.S. 10 June] 1812, starting Napoleon's invasion two days later. The declaration of war was presented in a diplomatic note by French ambassador Jacques Lauriston to Russian Foreign Minister Alexander Saltykov in Saint Petersburg. The note, preceded by two years of deteriorating French–Russian relations, stated that the request for passports by Russian ambassador Alexander Kurakin meant a severance of diplomatic relations and that Napoleon "from now on considers himself at war with Russia".

Mainstream Russian historiography often maintains that the French invasion of Russia was undeclared.

== Background ==
The declaration of war was preceded by two years of deteriorating French–Russian relations. In early 1812 France brought under its influence the Kingdom of Sweden and Prussia. On 14 April 1812, the representatives of Russian Tsar Alexander I presented an ultimatum in Paris, demanding a French withdrawal from Prussia and fortified sites in order to keep a neutral buffer zone between France and Russia. The ultimatum was rejected. According to contemporary Russian historian Alexander Mikhailovsky-Danilevsky, Alexander I regarded Napoleon's refusal to withdraw from Prussia and Swedish Pomerania as an act of war and intended to proceed offensively in such case. In that scenario, according to the contingency plan, the Russian army would have crossed the border at the Neman in Olita, Merecha and Grodno. From April 1812, Kurakin started to demand passports for his recall and return, citing French Foreign Minister Hugues-Bernard Maret's avoidance of discussing the future Franco-Russian agreement on disputed matters proposed by Napoleon earlier in February. Napoleon put the blame on Russia's refusal to comply with the Treaty of Tilsit and of Erfurt.

As the French started to cross the Oder in April 1812, Russian Field Marshal Michael Andreas Barclay de Tolly asked for Alexander's I authorization to start offensive actions under the contingency plan, but Alexander I replied that further decisions will be made upon his arrival to Vilnius (Vilno at the time). Having arrived to Vilnius on 26 April [O.S. 14 April], Alexander I conducted a review of troops, finding them in good condition. At the end of April Alexander I received the French diplomat Louis, comte de Narbonne-Lara in Vilnius, to whom he presented the Russian rationale for taking proactive measures: the spread of French dominance in neighboring lands, approachment to the Russian borders and the French refusal to withdraw from Prussia and Swedish Pomerania. Danilevsky further describes Russian defensive plans in the event of French invasion, but notes that Napoleon's entry point into Russia was impossible to predict.

On 12 June 1812, Maret, in a correspondence with Kurakin, stated that France cannot accept Russian demands about French withdrawal behind the Elbe as a prerequisite to all peace negotiations and that France regards Kurakin's demand for passports as a declaration of war. On 22 June [O.S. 10 June], Alexander I wrote to Saltykov: "We expect to be attacked every hour. With full hope in the Almighty and in the courage of the Russian troops, we are preparing to repel the enemy".

== Declaration of war ==
On 22 June 1812, Lauriston, in response to Kurakin's repetitive demand for passports, handed the declaration of war to Saltykov and also requested passports for himself and the entire embassy in order to return to France. Contrary to instructions from Paris, Lauriston tried to delay the formal declaration of war on Russia.

On the same day, the second Bulletin of the Grande Armée was published, stating that "all means of effecting an understanding between the two empires became impossible". The bulletin further noted Kurakin's "arrogant and extraordinary" sine qua non demand that he would not offer explanations until France withdraws from its allied territories.

After the war, Napoleon remarked: "I did not wish to declare war against Russia, but I had the impression that Russia wanted to break with me. I knew very well the difficulties of such a campaign".

== Russian historiography ==
Early and modern Russian historiography often maintains that the French invasion of Russia was undeclared, despite Lauriston's note. Danilevsky stated that Napoleon regarded Kurakin's demand for passports and Russian refusal to receive Lauriston in Vilnius "as a sufficient rationale to invade Russia without the declaration of war". Similarly, Soviet historian Yevgeny Tarle did not mention Lauriston's note, considering instead Napoleon's later proclamation to the troops in Vilkaviškis Manor on 22 June as the declaration of war. The Research Institute of Military History at the Military Academy of the General Staff of the Armed Forces of the Russian Federation regards the invasion as having occurred "without prior declaration of war" on the basis that the note was delivered to Alexander I in Vilnius only three days later, after the start of the invasion.

Despite that, Lauriston's note was published in 1962 in the multivolume work The Foreign Policy of Russia of the 19th and the Beginning of the 20th Century by the Soviet Ministry of Foreign Affairs. Some Russian historians, such as Konstantin Zalessky and Alexander Podmazo, also acknowledged the declaration of war.
