= Amnesty Act =

1872 U.S. federal law

Amnesty Act of 1872
- Long title: An Act to remove political Disabilities imposed by the fourteenth Article of the Amendments of the Constitution of the United States.
- Nicknames: Amnesty Act of 1872
- Enacted by: the 42nd United States Congress

Citations
- Public law: Pub. L. 42–193
- Statutes at Large: 17 Stat. 142

Legislative history
- Introduced in the House as H.R. 2761 by Benjamin Butler (R–MA) on May 13, 1872; Passed the House on May 13, 1872 (voice vote); Passed the Senate on May 21, 1872 (38-2); Signed into law by President Ulysses S. Grant on May 22, 1872

The Amnesty Act of 1872 is a United States federal law passed on May 22, 1872, which removed most of the penalties imposed on former Confederates by the Fourteenth Amendment, adopted on July 9, 1868. Section 3 of the Fourteenth Amendment prohibits the election or appointment to any federal or state office of any person who had held any of certain offices and then engaged in insurrection, rebellion, or treason. However, the section provides that a two-thirds vote by each House of the Congress could override this limitation. The 1872 act was passed by the 42nd United States Congress and the original restrictive Act was passed by the United States Congress in May 1866.

Specifically, the 1872 Act removed office-holding disqualifications against most of the secessionists who rebelled in the American Civil War, except for "Senators and Representatives of the thirty-sixth and thirty-seventh Congresses, officers in the judicial, military, and naval service of the United States, heads of departments, and foreign ministers of the United States."

In the spirit of the act, then United States President Ulysses S. Grant, by proclamation dated June 1, 1872, directed all district attorneys having charge of proceedings and prosecutions against those who had been disqualified by the Fourteenth Amendment to dismiss and discontinue them, except as to persons who fall within the exceptions named in the act. President Grant also pardoned all but 500 former top Confederate leaders.

The 1872 law cleared over 150,000 former Confederate troops who had taken part in the American Civil War.

== Text ==
Be it enacted by the Senate and House of Representatives of the United States of America in Congress assembled (two-thirds of each house concurring therein), that all political disabilities imposed by the third section of the fourteenth article of amendments of the Constitution of the United States are hereby removed from all persons whomsoever, except Senators and Representatives of the thirty-sixth and thirty-seventh Congresses, officers in the judicial, military, and naval service of the United States, heads of departments, and foreign ministers of the United States.

== Legacy ==
The Amnesty Act of 1872 states that all political disabilities imposed by the Fourteenth Amendment "are hereby removed," but does not explicitly mention whether future disabilities under the same amendment are also to be considered removed. In March 2022, in the aftermath of the January 6 US Capitol attack, the US District Court for the Eastern District of North Carolina ruled that the Act applies even to current members of Congress, automatically removing the political consequences of any alleged violation of Section 3. The United States Court of Appeals for the Fourth Circuit unanimously reversed that ruling. A different federal district court ruled that the Act does not apply to current members of Congress, and that Section 3 is still applicable. The plaintiff's appeal to the United States Court of Appeals for the Eleventh Circuit was dismissed as moot after it was determined that she had not violated Section 3.

== See also ==
- Compromise of 1877
