= 1872 Metropolitan Police strike =

Pro ar(e)is et focis (caricature in Punch magazine, 1872)

The 1872 Metropolitan Police strike was a refusal to work by 180 men of 'D' (Marylebone), 'E' (Holborn) and 'T' (Kensington) Divisions of the Metropolitan Police of London on 16 November. The strike was held in protest at the dismissal of PC Henry or Harry Goodchild (1840-1899), who had acted as a secretary coordinating meetings amongst police who were demanding improvements over pay and conditions. It is considered the first strike by police in the United Kingdom.

The strike only lasted a few hours. Of the police who stopped work, 69 were dismissed from the force. The rest were allowed back on duty after having had apologised for their conduct. They gained improvements in pay and conditions, but did not form a trade union – most officers considered the police a quasi-military institution and so would not consider this. This action was significant for establishing a precedent for collective action by police in order to improve working conditions.
