= Manuela Gandarillas =

Manuela Eras de Gandarillas (c. 1740s – 27 May 1812) is one of the Heroinas de la Coronilla. She was a blind woman, who fought for her nation's independence (cerro San Sebastian-Coronilla-close to Cochabamba, Bolivia) on 27 May 1812.

Manuela found out that the Spanish soldiers, commanded by José Manuel de Goyeneche, were coming to attack Cochabamba. She encouraged other women to join her and stop the Spanish soldiers. Since there were no men present, Manuela said to the women – "Nuestra casa es divina", which means "our house is sacred" in Spanish.

There is now a statue to represent these 300 Bolivian women in the Colina de San Sebastián, Bolivia and also every 27 May Bolivia celebrates the Day of the Bolivian Mother (in Spanish, 'dia de la madre boliviana').

== Biography ==
Details about Gandarillas' early life and family are largely unclear. According to historian Edmundo Areze, Manuela's parents were Jose Aras and Gandarillas and Margarita Fernandez. It is assumed that her father fought for independent cause, and was shot. Some historians say she was the only girl in the family with 11 brothers. Her real date of birth is also in doubt, and is presumed to be in 1782 and not in 1752.
