= Kim Gap-sun =

Korean bureaucrat and slaver (1872–1961)

- Hangul: 김갑순
- Hanja: 金甲淳
- RR: Gim Gapsun
- MR: Kim Kapsun

Art name
- Hangul: 동우
- Hanja: 東尤
- RR: Dongu
- MR: Tongu

Courtesy name
- Hangul: 순갑
- Hanja: 淳甲
- RR: Sungap
- MR: Sun'gap

Kim Gap-sun (Korean: 김갑순; Hanja: 金甲淳; May 22, 1872 – 1961) was a Joseon bureaucrat and modern Korean businessman, politician, and realtor. He was a significant slaver and landowner in South Chungcheong Province during the Japanese colonial period.

In his early life he was successively Governor of Buyeo County (1902), Noseong County (1903–1905, 1907–1910), Gongju County (1906–1907, 1910), Kimhwa County (1908–1910), and Asan county (1910–1911). His art name was Sungap, and his courtesy name was Dongwu.

Each time he took office as county governor, the thing he was most interested in was real estate. For example, in the 1930s, the area of Daejeon-eup was 1,907,400m^{2} (578,000 pyeong), and the land owned by Kim Gap-sun was 220,000 pyeong. So, at that time, he owned close to 50% of the land in Daejeon.

After liberation, he was arrested and tried by the Special Investigation Committee on Anti-National Acts (반민족행위특별조사위원회) in January 1949, but was released on bail.
