= William Haselden =

British cartoonist (1872–1953)

William Kerridge Haselden
- Born: 3 December 1872; Seville, Spain
- Died: 25 December 1953 (aged 81); Aldeburgh, Suffolk, England

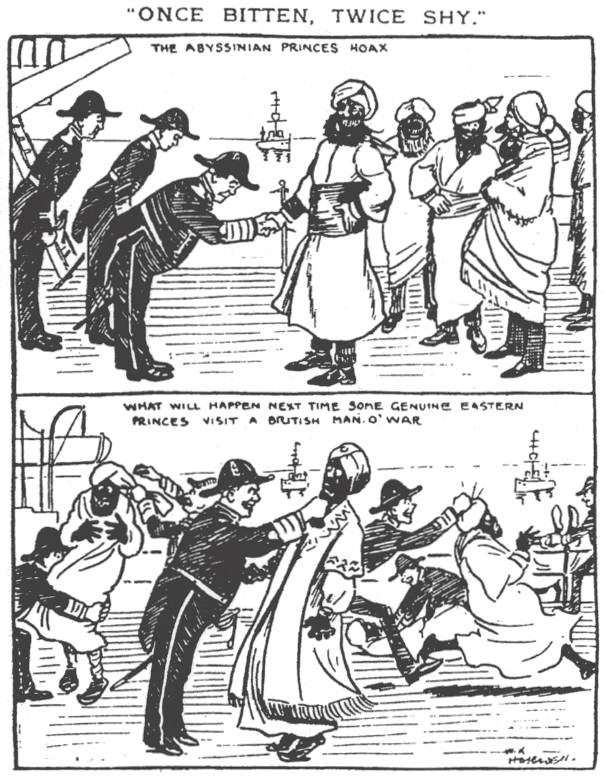
Haselden's comment in the Daily Mirror on the Dreadnought Hoax of February 1910

William Kerridge Haselden (3 December 1872 – 25 December 1953) was an English cartoonist and caricaturist.

== Early life and education ==
Haselden was born on 3 December 1872, and was the second of five children of Adolphe Henry Haselden, a civil engineer, and his wife Susan Elizabeth (née Kerridge). Haselden's parents were both English but met in Seville, Spain, where his father was director of the Seville Gasworks.

Haselden's father died during a family holiday to England in 1874, and the remaining family stayed in England, settling in Hampstead. The young William's education at a private school was cut short due to the family's financial problems, and he left school at the age of 16 with no formal artistic training.

== Career ==
He worked unhappily as an underwriter at Lloyd's in London for thirteen years before some of his sketches were accepted for the periodical The Sovereign. When this ceased publication a few months later, he obtained some freelance work on the Tatler and St. James's Gazette. After approaching the offices of Alfred Harmsworth in 1903, Haselden managed to obtain a full-time post on Harmsworth's new venture, the Daily Mirror. Here he remained until his retirement in 1940.

At the Daily Mirror, Haselden originally started with political cartoons, but soon settled into his trademark style of gentle, conservative social commentary reflecting on middle-class fashions and manners. His cartoons usually consisted of a single frame divided into a number of panels, for which he has been viewed as the father of British strip cartoon.

During World War I, Haselden established a popular reputation with his only truly sustained attempt at political caricature, the adventures of "Big and Little Willie", a satirical comic strip mocking Kaiser Wilhelm and his son, the Crown Prince. A compilation, The Sad Adventures of Big and Little Willie, was published in 1915; the same year the first British tank prototype would be named Little Willie.

Haselden often lampooned social and technological trends of the time by making bold predictions about how the future would transpire, including fashion, camera phones and feminism.

From 1906, Haselden contributed to Punch as a theatrical caricaturist, retiring in 1936 due to increasing deafness. Haselden's work for the Daily Mirror was published in 29 volumes of Daily Mirror Reflections between 1906 and 1935. His work drew praise from celebrities including Margot Asquith, Stanley Baldwin, Paul Nash, Walter Sickert.

== Personal life and death ==
In 1907 Haselden married Eleanor Charlotte Lane-Bayliff (1875–1944). They had two children, Celia Mary and John Kerridge Haselden. Haselden spent most of his working life resident in London, but from the mid-1930s spent more time at the family's holiday home in Aldeburgh, Suffolk, to which he eventually retired. He died of natural causes on Christmas Day, 1953.

== Legacy ==
His obituary in The Times recalled the hallmark of his work as its "unfailing amiability". Its editorial of the same day complimented his work as a sourcebook for the social historian, adding that "the man who could avoid the cartoonist's two pitfalls of cruelty and insipidity was no small artist, even in a small field".

== Bibliography ==
Works by Haselden, or featuring cartoons by Haselden:

- Haselden, W.K. (with Charles Harrison), Accidents will happen; or the tribulations of Mr and Mrs Boffles under the Employers' Liability Act, 1907 (London: David Nutt, 1907)
- Daily Mirror reflections; being 100 cartoons (and a few more) culled from the pages of the "Daily Mirror". 29 vols (London: Daily Mirror Newspapers, 1906–1935) (Note: published annually. Reflections changed their name to Daily Mirror reflections in Wartime for 1915–1919 (i.e. published 1914–1918).
- The Globe by the way book: a literary quick-lunch for people who have only got 5 minutes to spare (London, 1908)
- "How I began as an artist", T.P.'s Weekly (19 May 1914)
- The sad experiences of Big and Little Willie during the first six months of the Great War, August 1914 – January 1915; as portrayed by W.K. Haselden in "The Daily Mirror" (London: Fine Art Society / Chatto & Windus, 1915)
- Tweedie, E.B., America as I saw it; or America revisited; with 54 illustrations, including 16 cartoons by W.K. Haselden (London: Hutchinson & Co., 1913)

Other works: interviews, obituaries, books etc.:

- Obituaries in the Times (29 December 1953) and Punch (6 January 1954)
- Bryant, M. and Heneage, S., Dictionary of British cartoonists and caricaturists, 1730–1980 (London: Scolar Press, 1994)
- Cudlipp, H., Publish and de damned! (London: Andrew Dakers, 1953)
- Edelmann, M., The Mirror: a political history (London, 1966)
- Little, D.J., "Images of Germany as portrayed in the cartoons of W.K. Haselden, 1905–1918", unpublished M.A. thesis, University of Kent (1996).
- Low, D., British cartoonists, caricaturists and comic artists (London, 1942)
- Nash, P, 'English humorous draughtsmen", The week-end review (18 July 1931)
- Pound, R. and Harmsworth, G., Northcliffe (London: Cassell, 1959)
- Scott, E. Clement, "W.K. Haselden and his work", The London Magazine, vol. 25, no. 147 (1910)
- Sitwell, O., A free house! Or, artist as craftsman; being the writings of Walter Richard Sickert (London: Macmillan & Co., 1947)
