= Ana María Martínez de Nisser =

Colombian soldier and diarist (1812-1872)

Ana María Martínez de Nisser (December 6, 1812 – September 18, 1872) was a Colombian fighter and writer.

Martínez de Nisser was born in Sonsón, Antioquia in 1812. Eventually, she married a Swedish immigrant, Pedro Nisser. During the War of the Supremes, she learned that her husband had been captured by rebels. At age 28, driven both by her desire to rescue her husband and her intense patriotism, she cut her hair, got together a uniform, and volunteered to fight for the government's side; she took part in the Battle of Salamina on 5 May 1841.

She later published her diary recounting her experiences.
