= Siege of Santa Cruz =

- Part of Philippine Revolution
Date	24 June – 30 August 1898 (2 months, 6 days)
Location	Santa Cruz, Laguna, Philippines
Result	Filipino victory
Territorial changes	Filipino revolutionaries liberate Laguna

Belligerents
Dictatorial Government of the Philippines	Spanish Empire

Commanders and leaders
Paciano Rizal; Severino Taiño; Jacinto Talcon	Mariano Albertí; Don Antonio del Rio

Strength
10,000 men	700 cazadores infantry 2 gunboats

Casualties and losses
Unknown, heavy	Entire force surrendered 2 gunboats surrendered

The siege of Santa Cruz was launched by Filipino forces led by General Paciano Rizal, brother of political activist and writer Jose Rizal against a Spanish garrison in Santa Cruz, Laguna, Philippines. The siege took place until the garrison finally surrendered to the besieging Filipino force. It took place between 24 June and 30 August 1898, during the waning days of the Philippine Revolution.

== Prelude ==
When Filipino forces led by Emilio Aguinaldo liberated all of Cavite from Spanish control by the end of May 1898, the nearby provinces including Laguna were set to be next. Accordingly, starting June, Laguneño insurgents who joined the war of liberation in Cavite returned after its liberation, and as they returned to their home province their numbers were subsequently increased as huge numbers of local Laguneños rose up in rebellion.

Just a year before, disgusted and disillusioned with the death of his brother, Paciano Rizal joined the revolutionary movement and was subsequently appointed by Aguinaldo as brigadier general and was elected Secretary of Finance in the Departmental Government of Central Luzon. As the war once again intensified concurrently, he would use his position as the provincial revolutionary chief commander to organize an army to liberate Laguna. His efforts paid off when he captured his hometown Calamba with his army, and with reinforcements forthcoming he soon set his sights on the provincial capital of Santa Cruz, the last town in Laguna still remaining in Spanish control.

== Siege ==
Gen. Paciano Rizal marched to Santa Cruz and were later joined by other forces led by Severino Taiño. Don Jacinto Talcon, and several other Laguneño commanders. They arrived at the town by June 24. The combined size of their forces amount to a total of 10,000 men under arms. Meanwhile, Santa Cruz was defended by a detachment of 700 cazadores marksmen led by Lieutenant Colonel Mariano Albertí Leonés, with the provincial governor Don Antonio del Rio assisting them. It was also defended from Lake Bay by two gunboats, Otalora and Oceania. For more than 2 months, Filipino forces attempted to storm the town but each time were repulsed. The Spanish garrison only surrendered to the besiegers on August 30 once their commanders realized that further resistance was futile especially with the Philippine provisional revolutionary government in control of all provinces across the islands save for Manila. Favorable terms were secured and agreed on, including the surrender of the whole remainder of the garrison and two gunboats.

== Aftermath ==
With the fall of the provincial capital of Santa Cruz, all of Laguna is now under Filipino control.
