= Saint John the Baptist Parish Church (Calamba) =

Roman Catholic church in Laguna, Philippines

Calamba Church
- Saint John the Baptist Parish Church
- Simbahan ng Parokya ni San Juan Bautista (Filipino)
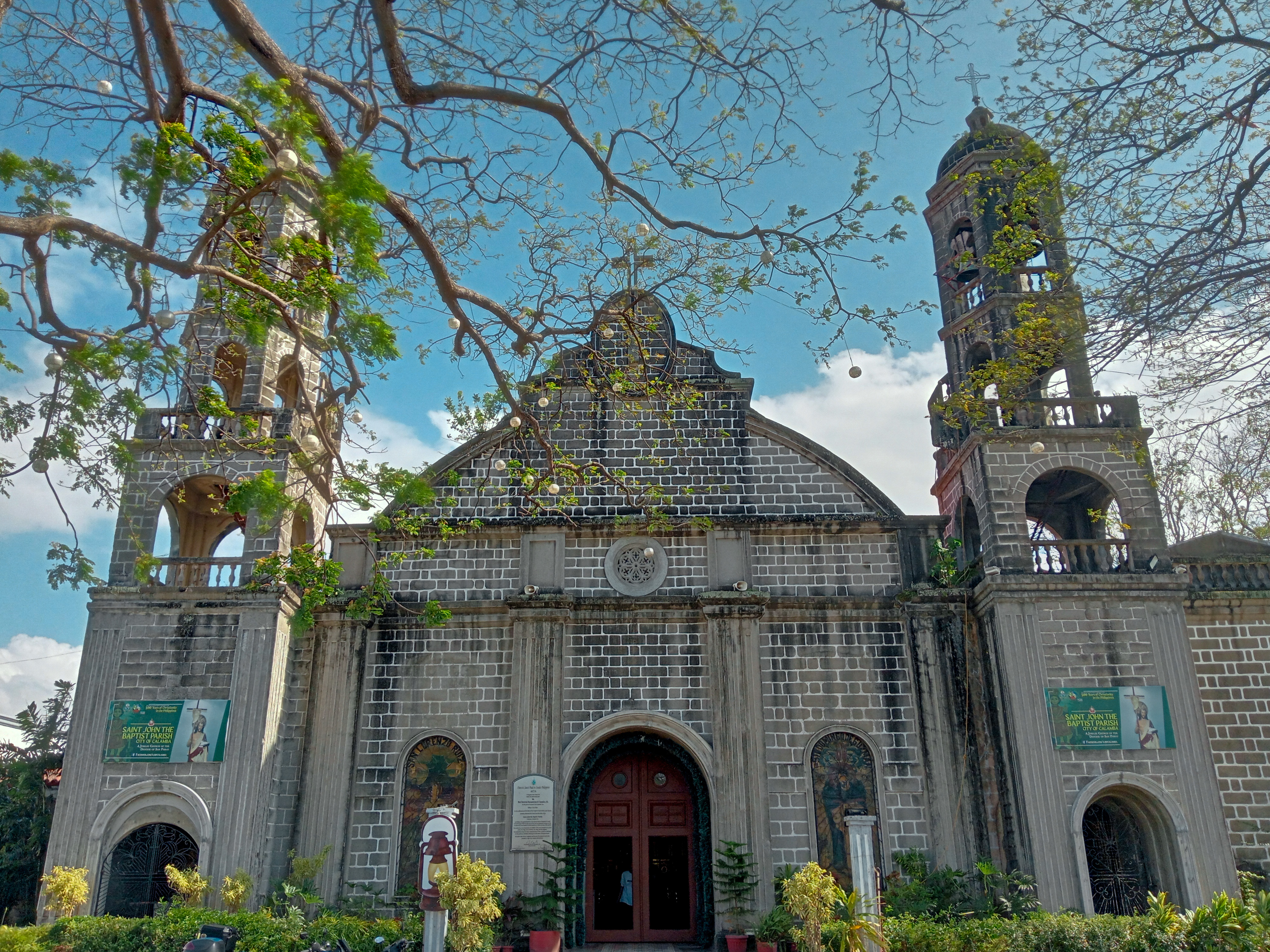
- Church facade in 2023

- Location in Laguna Location in Luzon Location in the Philippines
- 14°12′49″N 121°10′03″E
- Location: J.P. Rizal cor. Mercado St, Poblacion 5, Calamba, Laguna
- Country: Philippines
- Denomination: Roman Catholic

History
- Status: Parish church
- Founded: 1779
- Dedication: St. John the Baptist

Architecture
- Functional status: Active
- Heritage designation: National Historical Landmark
- Designated: January 14, 1974
- Architectural type: Church building
- Style: Baroque

Specifications
- Materials: Sand, gravel, cement, and bricks

Administration
- Province: Manila
- Metropolis: Manila
- Archdiocese: Manila
- Diocese: San Pablo
- Deanery: St. John the Baptist

Clergy
- Priest: Mario Rafael Castillo

Saint John the Baptist Parish Church, commonly known as Calamba Church, is the oldest Roman Catholic church in Calamba, Laguna, Philippines under the Diocese of San Pablo. It is located adjacent to Rizal Shrine and is known as the christening site of José Rizal.

== History ==
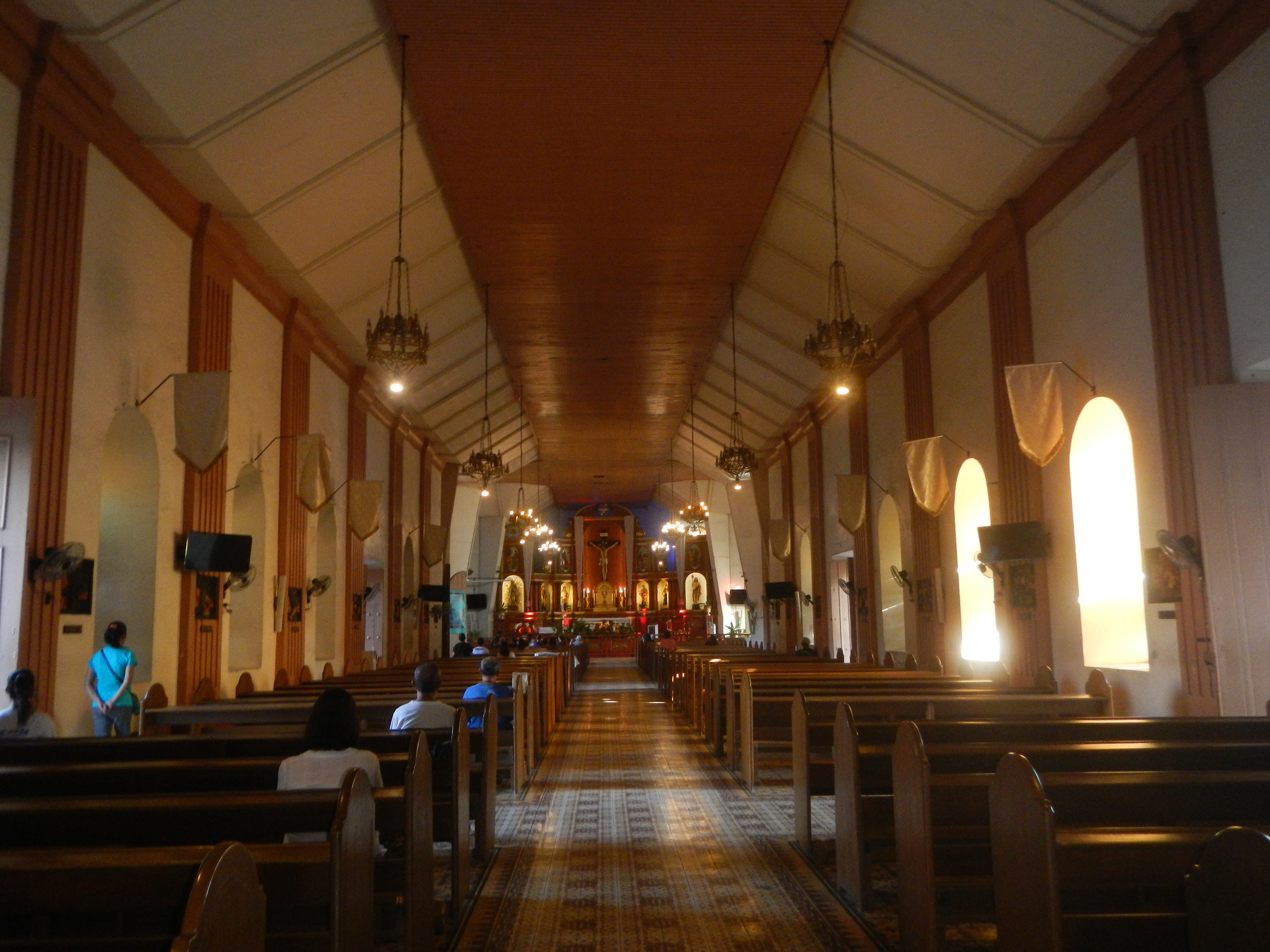
Church interior in 2018

Jesuit Missionaries in 1757 purchased a big portion of land called Hacienda de San Juan for their missions but the parish was only established in 1779 by the Franciscan friars upon gaining independence from the parochial church of Cabuyao (formerly known as Tabuco). The stone church was originally built in 1859 but destroyed on February 12, 1945, during the Second World War. The reconstruction of the church of Calamba was headed by Eliseo Dimaculangan. The original altar was burned in 1862, which destroyed parish records except for burial records, but immediately rebuilt by Leoncio Lopez. The first Filipino priest, Angel Villaruz, served the longest in this church for 43 years since 1901.

== Features ==
The church of Calamba is a stone church built under the Baroque style. It has several stained glasses, two of which are in the church entrance depicting Saint Dominic and San Lorenzo Ruiz. Other stained windows depicts the seven holy sacraments of the church such as baptism, reconciliation, confirmation and among others.

=== Baptistery ===
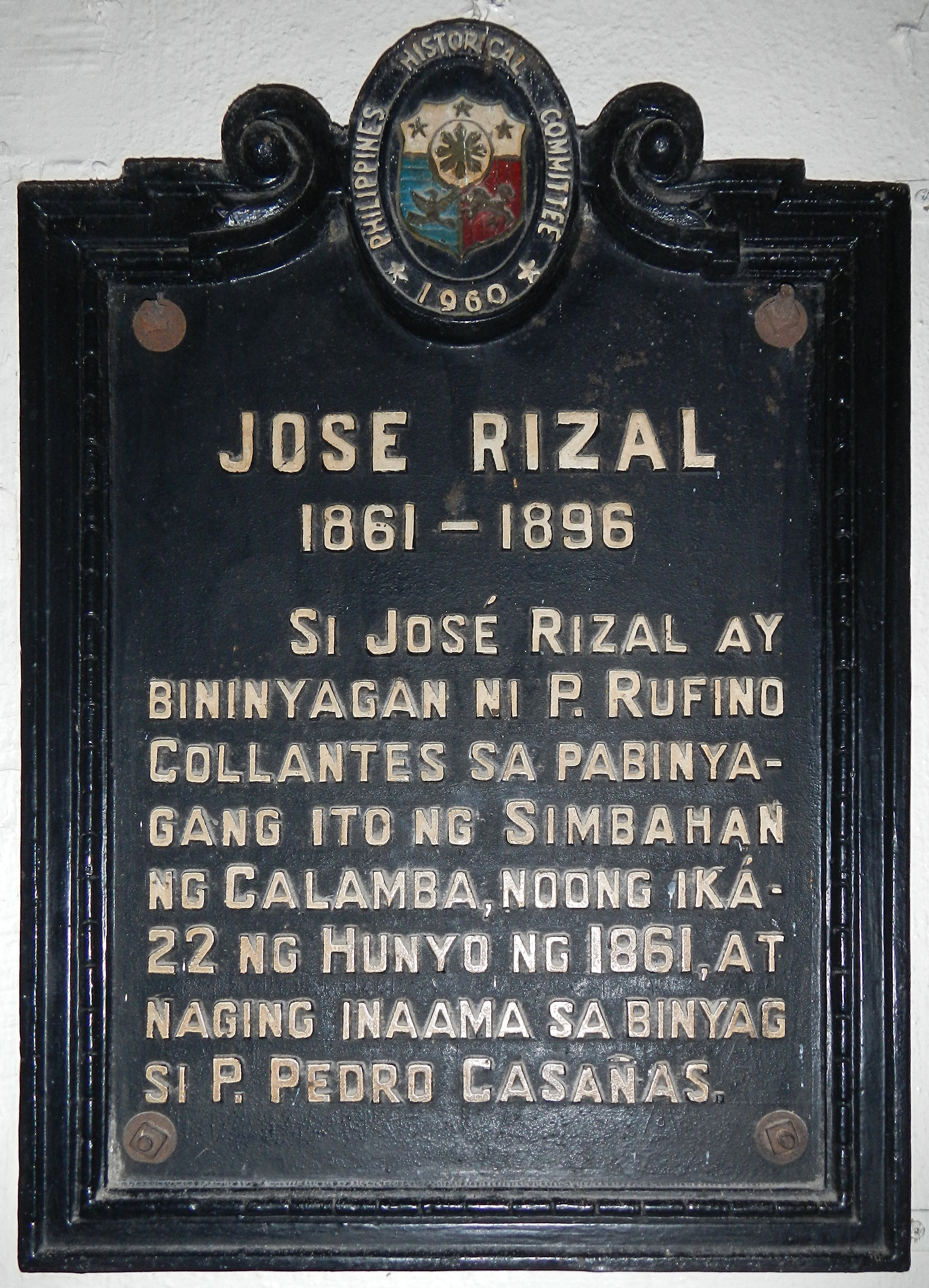
Jose Rizal PHC historical marker at the church installed in 1960

The church baptistery, where Rizal was baptized on June 22, 1861, by the then parish priest of Calamba Rufino Collantes and his godfather Pedro Casanas, is a recognized National Historical Landmark (Level 1). The declaration was made by virtue of Resolution No. 2 of the Philippine Historical Commission (now National Historical Commission of the Philippines) on August 19, 1976, under Section 4 of the Executive Order No. 260 dated August 1, 1973, and amended by Executive Order No. 375 dated January 14, 1974. The original baptismal font was restored including original church items and reliquaries during Rizal's time. A transcript of Rizal's existing baptismal record is displayed on the left side of the baptistery entrance. The original baptismal records including the canonical books were lost on September 28, 1862, when Calamba Church was razed by a fire.

The transcript of Rizal's baptismal certificate issued by Leoncio Lopez originally written in Spanish is shown below:

I, the parish priest of the town of Calamba, whose signature appears below, certify that as a result of inquiries, which with the proper authorization were made for the restoration of the canonical books (that were burned) on the 28th of September 1862 and are found in the file of baptisms, book n 1, page 49, it emerges according to the declaration of competent and sworn witnesses that Jose Rizal Mercado is legitimate son from the legitimate matrimony of Don Francisco Rizal Mercado and Dona Teodora Realonda (that) he was baptized in this parish on the 22nd of June 1861 by the parish priest Reverend Father Rufino Collantes, and his godfather was the Reverend Father Pedro Casanas. And I sign this as true. - Leoncio Lopez.

The baptistery was also the site of the christening of other notable people from Calamba, such as Paciano Rizal, Trinidad Rizal, Delfina Herbosa de Natividad, and Vicente Lim.

=== Garden of Gethsemane ===
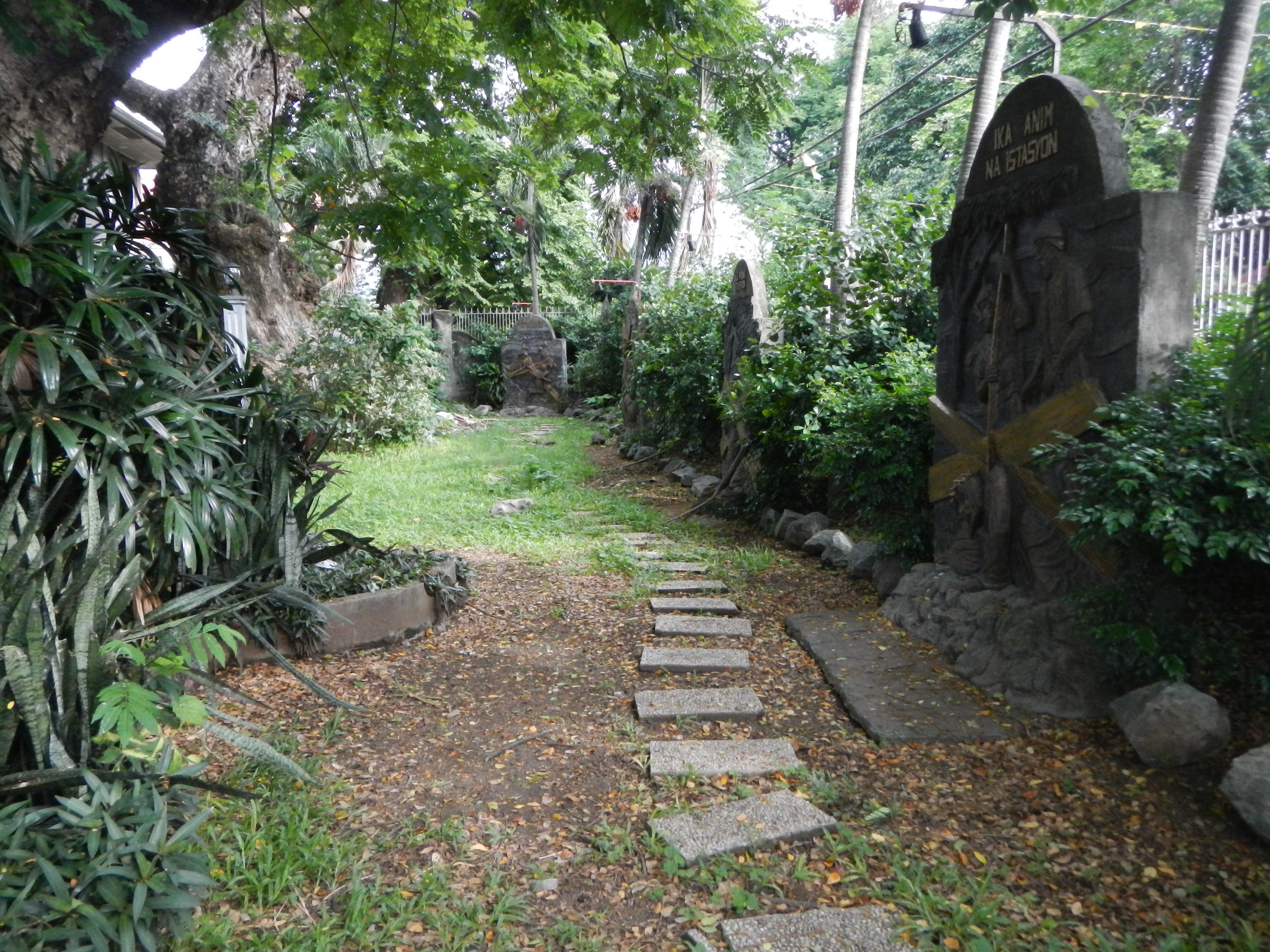
"Garden of Gethsemane"

A small garden, named the "Garden of Gethsemane", was located at the right side facing the church entrance and was designed for devotees who want to meditate or pray. It contained 14 life-size bas-relief of the Stations of the Cross, a "Well of Repentance" or Balon ng Pagbabalik Loob, and a statue of John the Baptist. These were demolished in 2019 to make way for the restoration of the church patio.

=== Other church sections ===
The church also includes an adoration chapel at the right side of the main church entrance and an adjacent mini-museum. Upon entering the church complex, there is a columbarium on the right side facing the church entrance.

== Bibliography ==
- Historical Markers: Regions I-IV and CAR. Manila: National Historical Institute (Philippines). 1993. p. 380. ISBN 9715380611.
