= Ilustrado (TV series) =

2014 Philippine television drama series

- Title card
- Genre: Historical drama
- Directed by: King Mark Baco
- Starring: Alden Richards
- Theme music composer: Gloc-9; Simon Tan; Joshua B. Gapasin
- Ending theme: "Para sa Bayan" by Gloc-9 and Lirah Bermundez
- Country of origin: Philippines
- Original language: Tagalog
- No. of episodes: 20

Production
- Executive producer: Jayson Bernard B. Santos
- Cinematography: Norberto "Nor" Domingo
- Editors: Emman Payumo; Henry Sabado; Alvin Caintic; Jack Cabanayan
- Camera setup: Multiple-camera setup
- Running time: 22–29 minutes
- Production company: GMA News and Public Affairs

Original release
- Network: GMA Network
- Release: October 20 – November 14, 2014

Ilustrado (transl. erudite) is a 2014 Philippine television drama period series broadcast by GMA Network. Directed by King Mark Baco, it stars Alden Richards. The series is based on the life of Philippine hero José Rizal. It premiered on October 20, 2014, on the network's Telebabad line up. The show concluded on November 14, 2014, with a total of 20 episodes.

In March 2016, the series was released on DVD by GMA Records Home Video. The series is streaming on YouTube.

== Premise ==
José Rizal needed to leave his family to fulfill his studies and career abroad, while also suffering from homesickness, and enduring a long-distance relationship with the woman he loved. He comes back home and uses the knowledge and skills he learned abroad to help improve the lives of his family and countrymen.

== Cast and characters ==
Cast

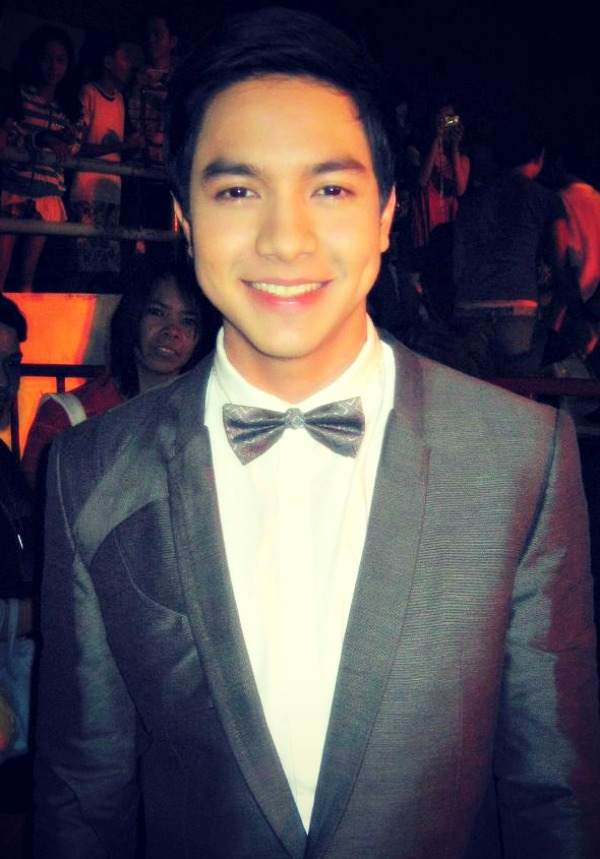
Alden Richards

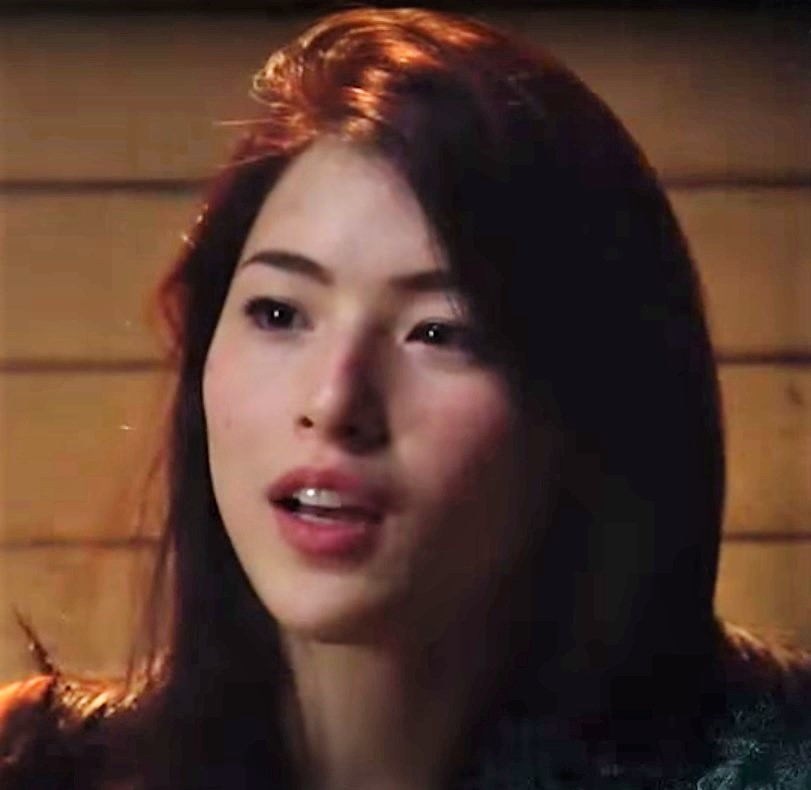
Kylie Padilla

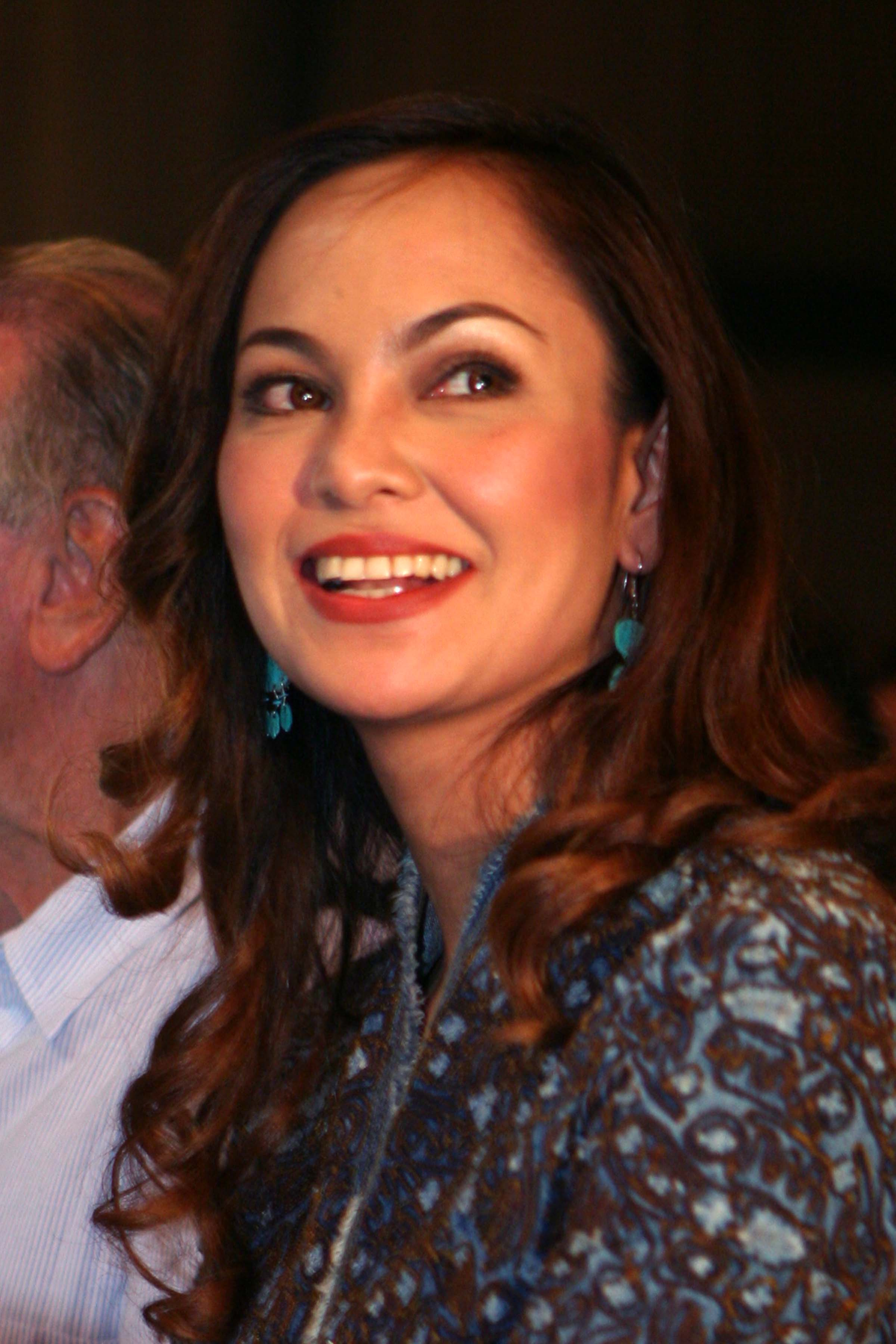
Eula Valdez

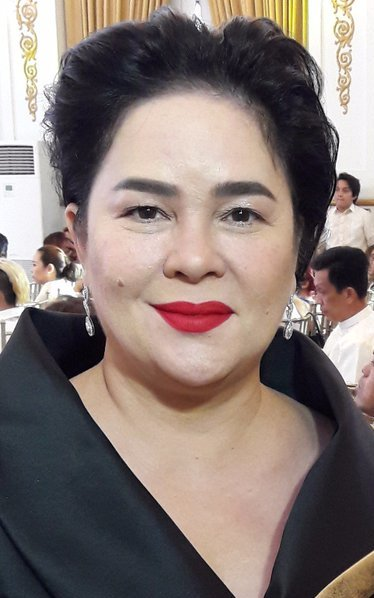
Jaclyn Jose

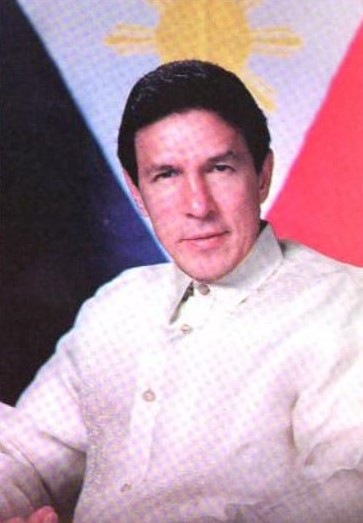
Freddie Webb

Lead cast

- Alden Richards as José Rizal / Pepe

Supporting cast

- Kylie Padilla as Leonor Rivera
- Eula Valdez as Teodora Alonso y Mercado
- Solenn Heussaff as Nellie Boustead
- Jaclyn Jose as Conchita Monteverde
- Ricardo Cepeda as Francisco Mercado
- Marco Alcaraz as Paciano Mercado
- Freddie Webb as Jose Alberto
- Polo Ravales as Venchito Monteverde
- Lito Legaspi as Padre Amado

Guest cast

- Jhiz Deocareza as younger José Rizal
- Sean Ross as younger Venchito Monteverde
- Max Collins as Consuelo "Suelo" Ortiga
- Wilma Olivar as Betang
- Junjun Quintana as Eduardo de Lete
- Angelina Kanapi as Teodora Formosa
- Raymond Alzona as Antonio
- Rhen Escaño as Isidra Monteverde
- Sue Prado as Saturnina
- Rolly Inocencio as Tiyago
- Silay Tan as Lina
- Elle Ramirez as Narcisa
- Lucho Ayala as José Alejandrino
- David Bianco as Charles Kipping
- Hazel Faith dela Cruz as Olimpia
- Marinela Sevidal as Carmen
- Vien King as Chengoy
- JC Tiuseco as Antonio Luna
- Mike Liwag as Marcelo H. del Pilar
- Carlo Cruz as Graciano López Jaena
- Jak Roberto as Máximo Viola
- Mark Bordalba as Félix Resurrección Hidalgo
- Charles Tongol as Dominador Gomez
- Cedrick Juan as Valentin Ventura
- Timothy dela Paz as Mariano Ponce
- Bryan Benedict as Juan Luna
- John Spainhour as Rubio Nicolas
- Sid Lucero as Andrés Bonifacio
- Glaiza de Castro as Gregoria de Jesus
- Benjamin Alves as Sebastian

== Episodes ==
Ilustrado episodes
No.	Title	Original release date	AGB Nielsen Mega Manila ratings
1	"Pilot"	October 20, 2015	17.4%
2	"Ang Mga Monteverde" (transl. the Monteverdes)	October 21, 2015	16.7%
3	"Ang Pagsubok ng Pamilyang Mercado" (transl. the trial of the Mercado family)	October 22, 2015	14.7%
4	"Ang Paglilitis kay Doña Lolay" (transl. the trial to madame Lolay)	October 23, 2015	14.3%
5	"Ang Unang Pagtatagpo nina Pepe at Leonor" (transl. the first meeting of Pepe and Leonor)	October 24, 2015	16.3%
6	"Ang Panliligaw ni Pepe" (transl. the courtship of Pepe)	October 27, 2015	15.3%
7	"Pepe Laban sa mga Guwardiya Sibil" (transl. Pepe against the civil guards)	October 28, 2015	13.2%
8	"Pagmamahalang Pilit Hahadlangan" (transl. love that keeps being hindered)	October 29, 2015	14.0%
9	"Ang Misyon ni Pepe" (transl. the mission of Pepe)	October 30, 2015	13.7%
10	"Ang Pagdating ni Pepe sa Europa" (transl. the arrival of Pepe in Europe)	October 31, 2015	15.3%
11	"Makikilala ni Pepe si Consuelo Ortiga" (transl. Pepe will know counselor Ortiga)	November 3, 2015	13.6%
12	"Ang Makabayang Ilustrado na si Pepe" (transl. the patriotic erudite that is Pepe)	November 4, 2015	13.3%
13	"Ang Panulat ang Gamot sa Sakit ng Bayan" (transl. the pen is cure to the sickness of town)	November 5, 2015	14.6%
14	"Ang Pagbabalik ni Pepe sa Pilipinas" (transl. the return of Pepe in the Philippines)	November 6, 2015	13.5%
15	"Nag-aapoy sa Galit ang mga Kalaban ni Pepe" (transl. burning anger of the enemies of Pepe)	November 7, 2015	14.3%
16	"Ang Bagong Pag-ibig ni Pepe" (transl. the new love of Pepe)	November 10, 2015	13.3%
17	"Ang Panggigipit sa Bayan ni Pepe" (transl. the oppression to the town of Pepe)	November 11, 2015	13.2%
18	"Katapangan sa Harap ng Kamatayan" (transl. courage in the front of death)	November 12, 2015	13.9%
19	"Ang Huling Laban ni Pepe" (transl. the final battle of Pepe)	November 13, 2015	15.1%
20	"Finale"	November 14, 2015	16.4%

== Accolades ==
Accolades received by Ilustrado
Year	Award	Category	Recipient	Result	Ref.
2015	PromaxBDA Global Excellence Awards	Best Art Direction/Design: Program Open/Titles	Ilustrado	Finalist	
2015	US International Film and Video Festival	Documentary: Craft/Production Techniques: Cinematography	Ilustrado	Certificate	
2015	NAMIC Excellence in Multicultural Marketing Awards	Social Media (third place)	Ilustrado World Premiere Tweet Up Promo	Won	
2015	37th Catholic Mass Media Awards	Best Drama Series/Program	Ilustrado	Won	
2015	29th PMPC Star Awards for Television	Best Drama Mini-series	Ilustrado	Won	
2015	29th PMPC Star Awards for Television	Best Drama Actor	Alden Richards	Won	
2015	29th PMPC Star Awards for Television	Best Supporting Actress	Eula Valdez	Nominated	
2015	PromaxBDA Asia	Best Program Opening Sequence (Silver Award)	Ilustrado	Won	
2016	New York Film Festivals Awards	Entertainment Program Open & Titles	Ilustrado	Finalist	
2016	New York Film Festivals Awards	Mini-Series	Ilustrado	Finalist	
