= Saturnina Hidalgo =

Jose Rizal's eldest sister

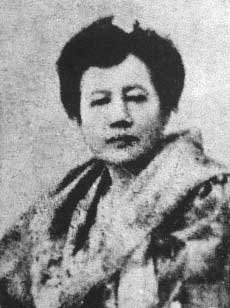
- Born: Saturnina Rizal Mercado y Alonso Realonda; June 4, 1850; Calamba, La Laguna, Captaincy General of the Philippines, Spanish Empire
- Died: September 14, 1913 (aged 63); Tanauan, Batangas, Philippine Islands
- Resting place: Manila North Cemetery, Manila, Philippines
- Other names: Saturnina Rizal; Saturnina Mercado
- Occupations: Homemaker and businesswoman, who helped look after the family’s farms and textile‑clothing trade after her marriage to Manuel T. Hidalgo.
- Known for: Being the eldest sibling of José Rizal, a steady supporter through his schooling, political troubles, and exile. She financed and released Pascual H. Poblete’s first‑ever Tagalog printed translation of Noli Me Tángere.
- Spouse: Manuel T. Hidalgo
- Parents: Francisco Rizal Mercado (father); Teodora Alonso Realonda (mother)
- Relatives: Paciano Rizal (brother); José Rizal (brother); Trinidad Rizal (sister)

Saturnina Rizal Mercado de Hidalgo (born Saturnina Rizal Mercado y Alonso Realonda; June 4, 1850 – September 14, 1913), Saturnina Hidalgo, also known as Neneng, was the eldest sister of Philippine national hero Dr. José Rizal. She was born on June 4, 1850, in Calamba, Laguna, and was known for his love and support for her family. She was married to Manuel T. Hidalgo, a native and one of the richest persons in Tanauan, Batangas. Saturnina helped Rizal pursue his education in Europe by giving him a valuable diamond ring that could be used in times of need. She also contributed to Philippine literature by helping make Rizal's novel Noli Me Tangere accessible to more Filipinos through its Tagalog translation. her support and dedication made her an important part of Rizal's life and legacy.

Because of her brother José's early interest in obstetrics, Saturnina – along with her mother and eight sisters – shared health concerns and sought medical advice from him. While he ultimately chose a different path, the women of the family encouraged Rizal in the direction of gynecology and obstetrics because of the high rates of maternal death and sickness from various women's diseases Filipinas experienced. In one letter, Hidalgo wrote:

I am sending you news that I now have two children, the eldest is Alfredo, next is Adela, and now I am eight months pregnant. Study well how you may be of assistance to our situation, certainly with so many of us there will always be someone suffering the hardships of this sickness.

An article documenting the emergence of Western medicine in the Philippines and healthcare consumption among wealthy Filipinas around the turn of the 20th century discussed gynecologist Felipe Zamora's medical assessment of Hidalgo's chronic health conditions as an illustration of how elite families utilized early Western medical consultations.

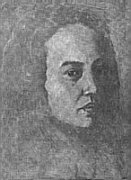
Oil painting of the young Saturnina by brother José Rizal.

In 1890, she initially begged her brother, José, to remedy the political situation in which her husband, whom she called Maneng, was deported to Bohol for his alliance with Rizal, a letter from later that year revealed her change of heart. When her husband was sent into exile a second time, this time to Mindoro, she assured Rizal she had refrained from crying. She wrote: "I have been inured to the pain of separation, especially when I consider that all this cruelty and misfortune will be for the good of all. My faith has become stronger because of everything you told me."

In 1909, Hidalgo published the first Tagalog/Filipino translation (by Pascual H. Poblete) of her brother's revolutionary novel Noli Me Tángere, thus, ensuring Rizal's words became accessible, beyond elite Spanish-speaking circles, to the common Filipino.

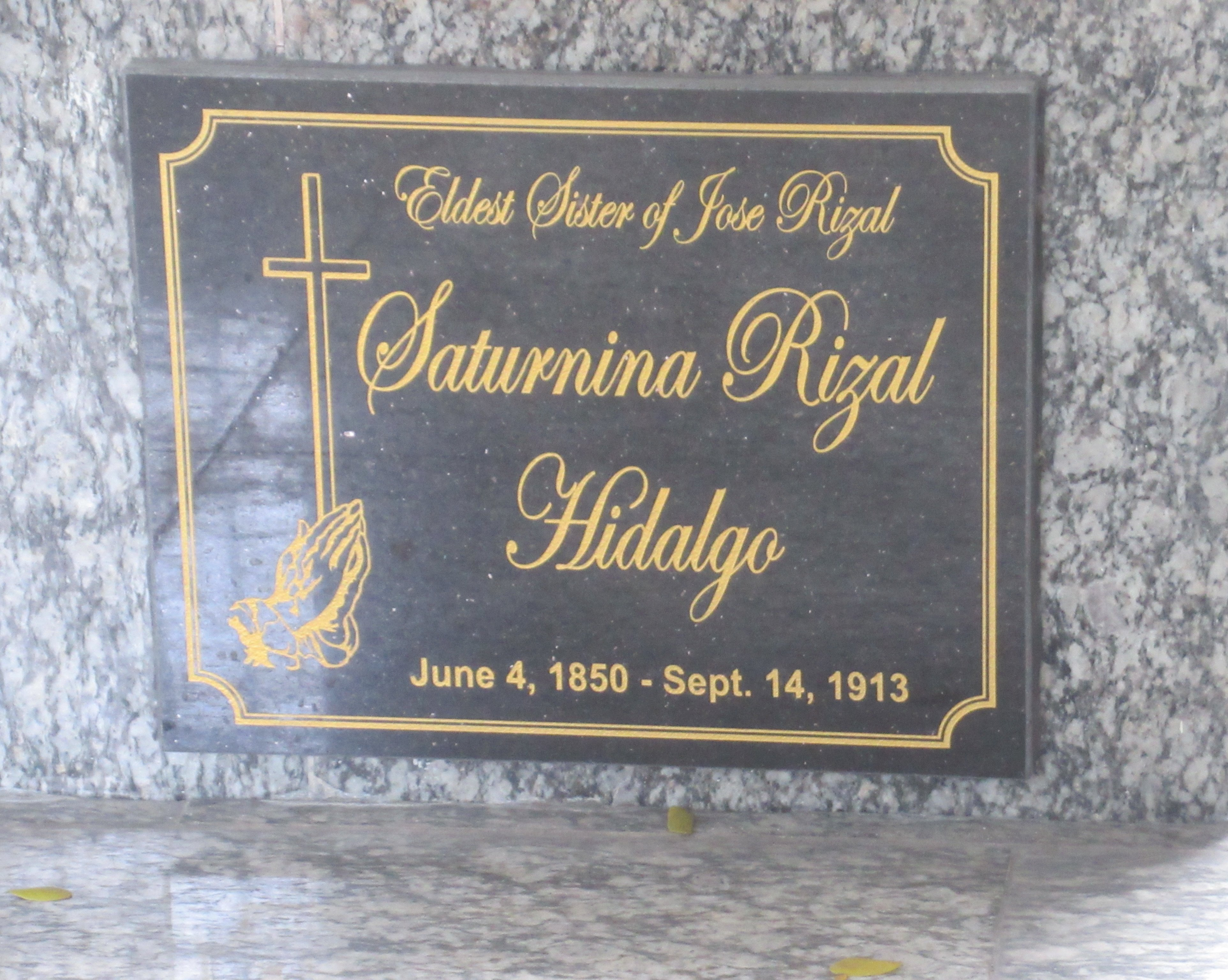
Hidalgo's tomb inside the Rizal Hidalgo Ver Mausoleum at the Manila North Cemetery

She died on September 14, 1913.

== Media portrayal ==
- Portrayed by Gina Alajar in the 1998 film, Jose Rizal.
- Portrayed by Sue Prado in the 2014 TV series, Ilustrado.
