= Rizal Shrine (Calamba) =

Historic mansion in Laguna, Philippines

- Dambanang Rizal (Filipino)
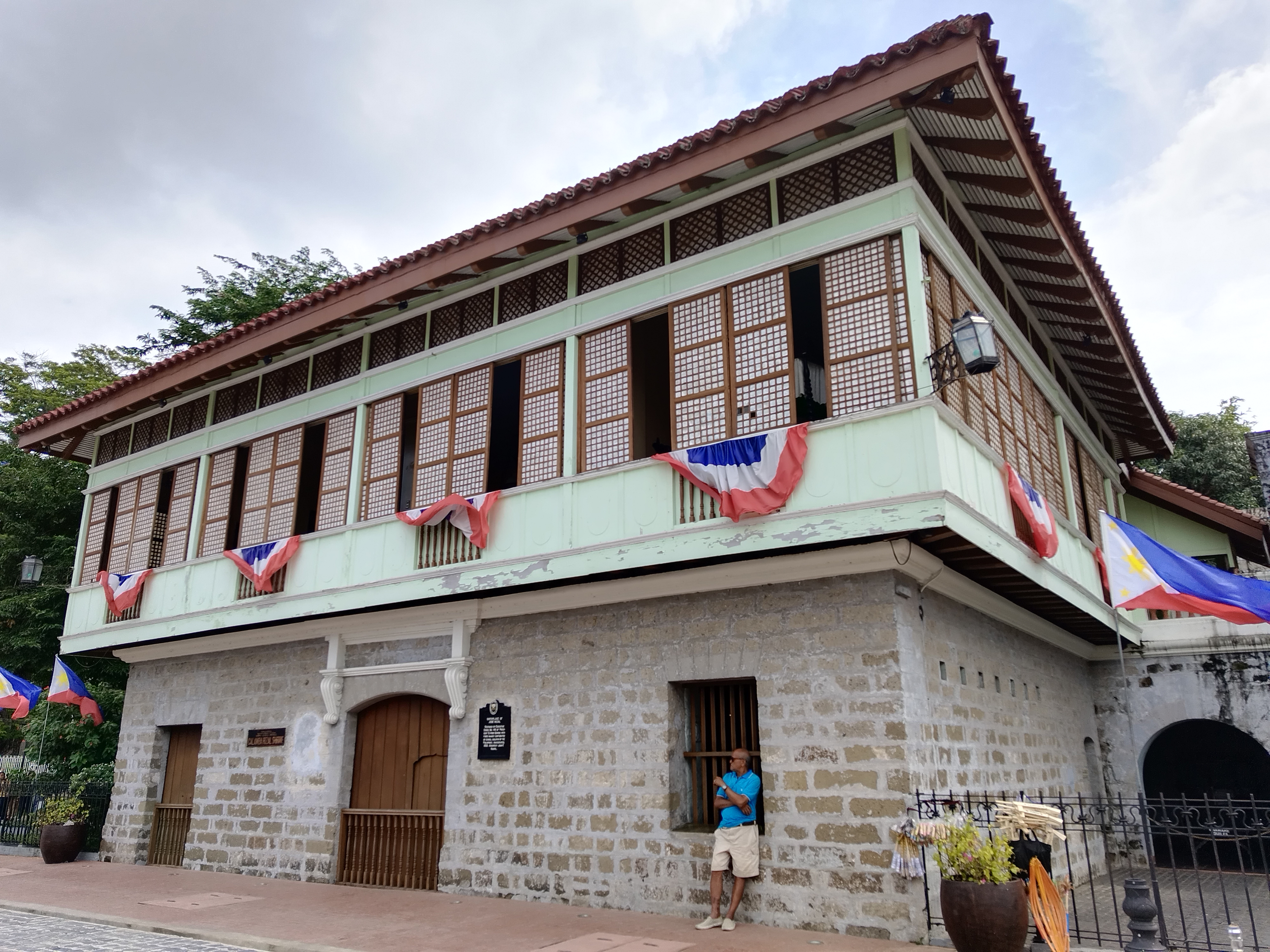
- Rizal Shrine in 2023
- Alternative names: Rizal House; Rizal's Birthplace

General information
- Status: Completed
- Type: Mansion
- Architectural style: Bahay na Bato
- Location: Francisco Mercado St. cor. Jose P. Rizal St., Brgy. 5, Poblacion, Calamba, Laguna, Philippines
- Coordinates: 14°12′49″N 121°10′01″E
- Inaugurated: June 19, 1950
- Renovated: 1949
- Owner: Government of the Philippines

Technical details
- Material: Stones, Bricks, and Wood
- Floor count: Two with a separate building with museum and an audio-visual room

Design and construction
- Designations: National Shrine (Level 1)

Renovating team
- Architect: Juan F. Nakpil

Other information
- Number of rooms: 3

The Rizal Shrine (Filipino: Dambanang Rizal) is a reproduction of the original two-story, Bahay na bato in Calamba, Laguna where José Rizal was born on June 19, 1861. Rizal is regarded as one of the greatest national heroes of the Philippines.

The house is designated as a National Shrine (Level 1) by the National Historical Commission of the Philippines. It is located along Mercado Street and Rizal Street in Calamba's Poblacion 5 and is in close proximity to St. John the Baptist Parish Church and the City College of Calamba.

== History ==
José Rizal's father, Francisco Rizal Mercado, took 2 years to build the original Rizal ancestral house. The Spanish authorities confiscated the house in 1891. Paciano Rizal, brother of José, reoccupied the house during the Philippine Revolution, but lost it again to the friars. It was subsequently sold, destroyed in World War II and eventually demolished. The government bought what remained of the Rizal House for ₱24,000.

In 1949, President Elpidio Quirino passed Executive Order No. 145, facilitating reconstruction of the house. Filipino school children provided most of the funding for the project while Juan F. Nakpil served as the supervising architect. Staying true to the original home, the reconstructed house occupies the same site and is built from the materials during the time the house was built.

On June 19, 1950, the newly built home was inaugurated and now serves as a repository for Rizal's memorabilia.

During the Centenary of the Philippine Independence in 1998, the National Commission for Culture and the Arts in cooperation with the National Centennial Commission, decided that Rizal's Shrine should focus specifically on his childhood.

The house is intended to provide an accurate representation of the home Rizal grew up in until his formal schooling in Biñan. Rizal's anecdotes often reference his childhood home, recounting the nipa hut in the garden where he used to sleep and learned to sculpt; the kitchen where he learned the alphabet; the bedroom where he learned to pray; the library where he discovered books and the azotea where he listened to his grandmother's stories of "skeletons, buried treasures and trees that bloomed with diamonds."

Near Rizal's home is the church where he was baptised, Saint John the Baptist Parish Church.

== Features ==
The Rizal Shrine is a typical rectangular Bahay na Bato, reminiscent of upper-class Filipino homes built during the Spanish Colonial era. The lower portion is made of adobe stone and brick, while the upper portion consists of hardwood. The original interior flooring of the house was discovered during reconstruction and utilized. Its windows have sliding window sashes using capiz shells, the exterior walls are painted green (originally white) and the roof is constructed of red ceramic tile. In June 2009, the National Historical Institute (now National Historical Commission of the Philippines) ordered the shrine's repainting to highlight the meaning of Rizal's surname.

The ground floor of the house historically served as a stable for horses and carriages. It contains several exhibits on Rizal's childhood, including exact copies of Rizal's writings, drawings and original baptismal certificate. The upper floor served as the family's living quarters and consisted of the living room, dining area, the bathroom and the library. Containing more than 1000 books, a caida serves as Francisco Mercado's library, the largest private library in Calamba at that time. Adjacent to the library is the family's formal dining room, where Rizal's parents hosted guests and other prominent members of the society. The caida is connected to a sala, which leads to three bedrooms: the boys' room (for Jose and Paciano), the girls' room for his 9 sisters and the master bedroom. The biggest among all the rooms, the master bedroom contains the four-poster bed where Rizal was born. Going beyond the sala is an informal dining room or comedor. Prominent in this room is the punkah, a large rectangular Indian fan. Next to the comedor and the azotea is an old well, one of the only surviving features of the original house.

Rizal Shrine Calamba

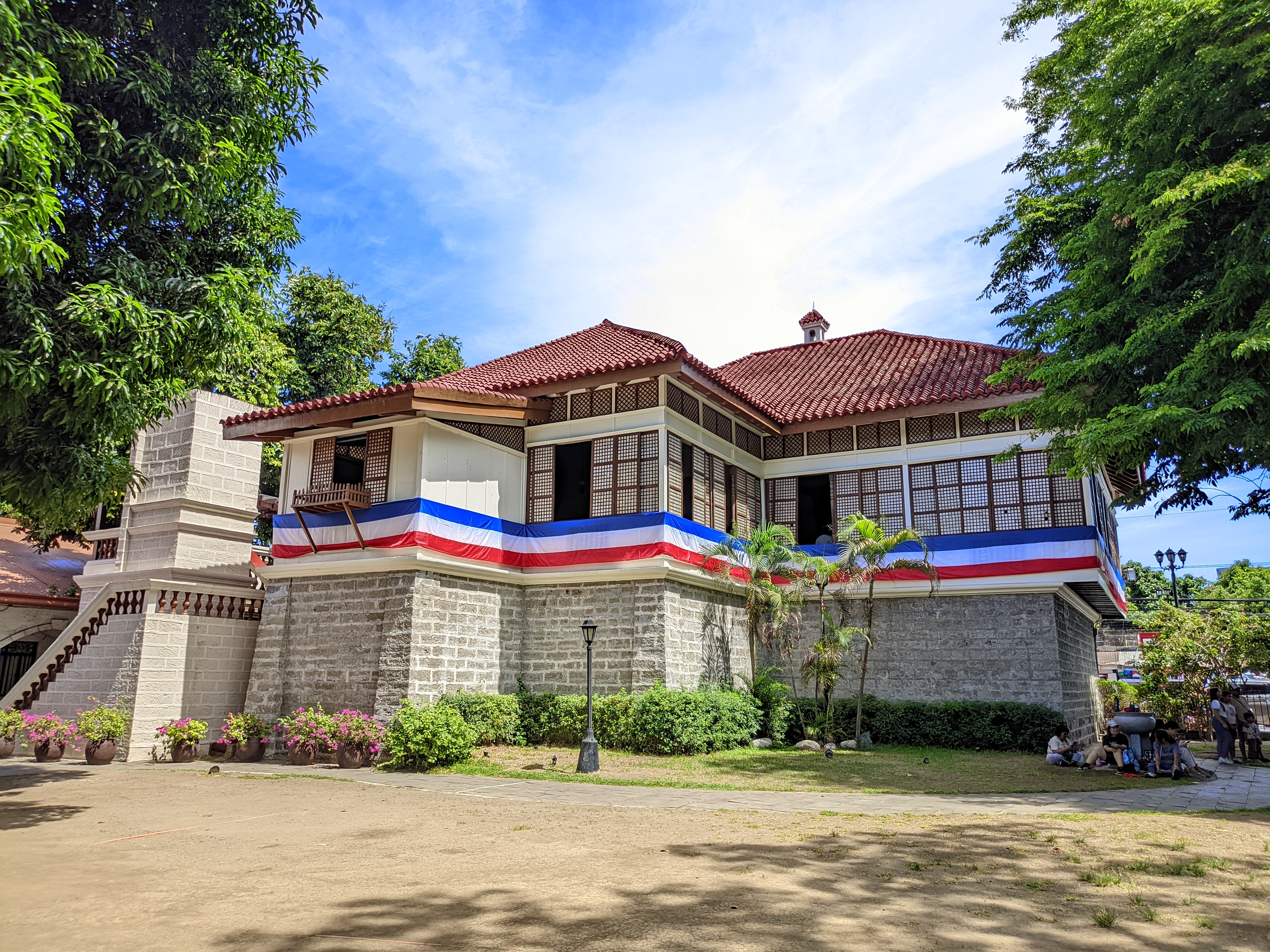
Rizal Shrine in 2026

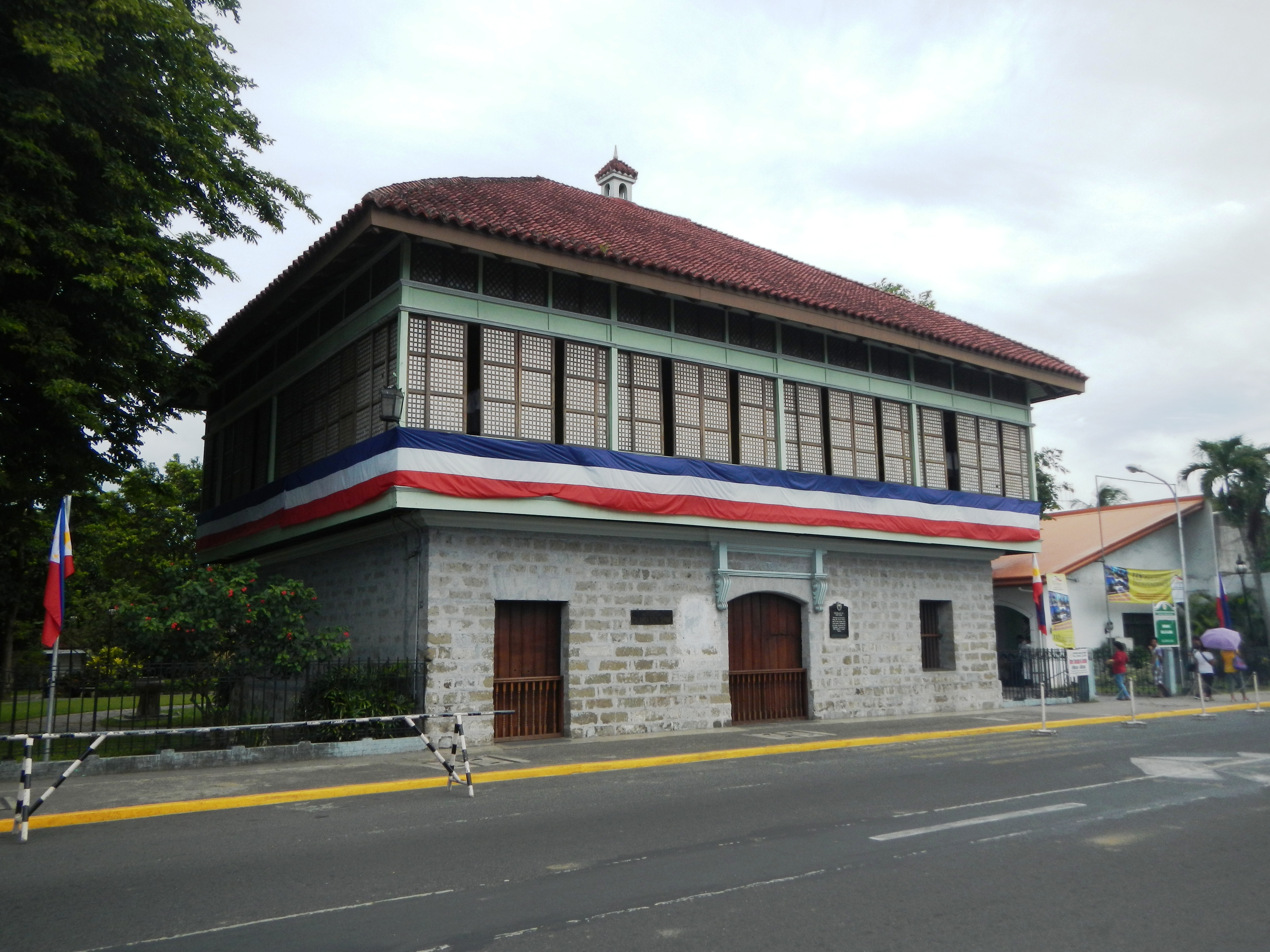
Original view of Rizal Shrine before it was painted green

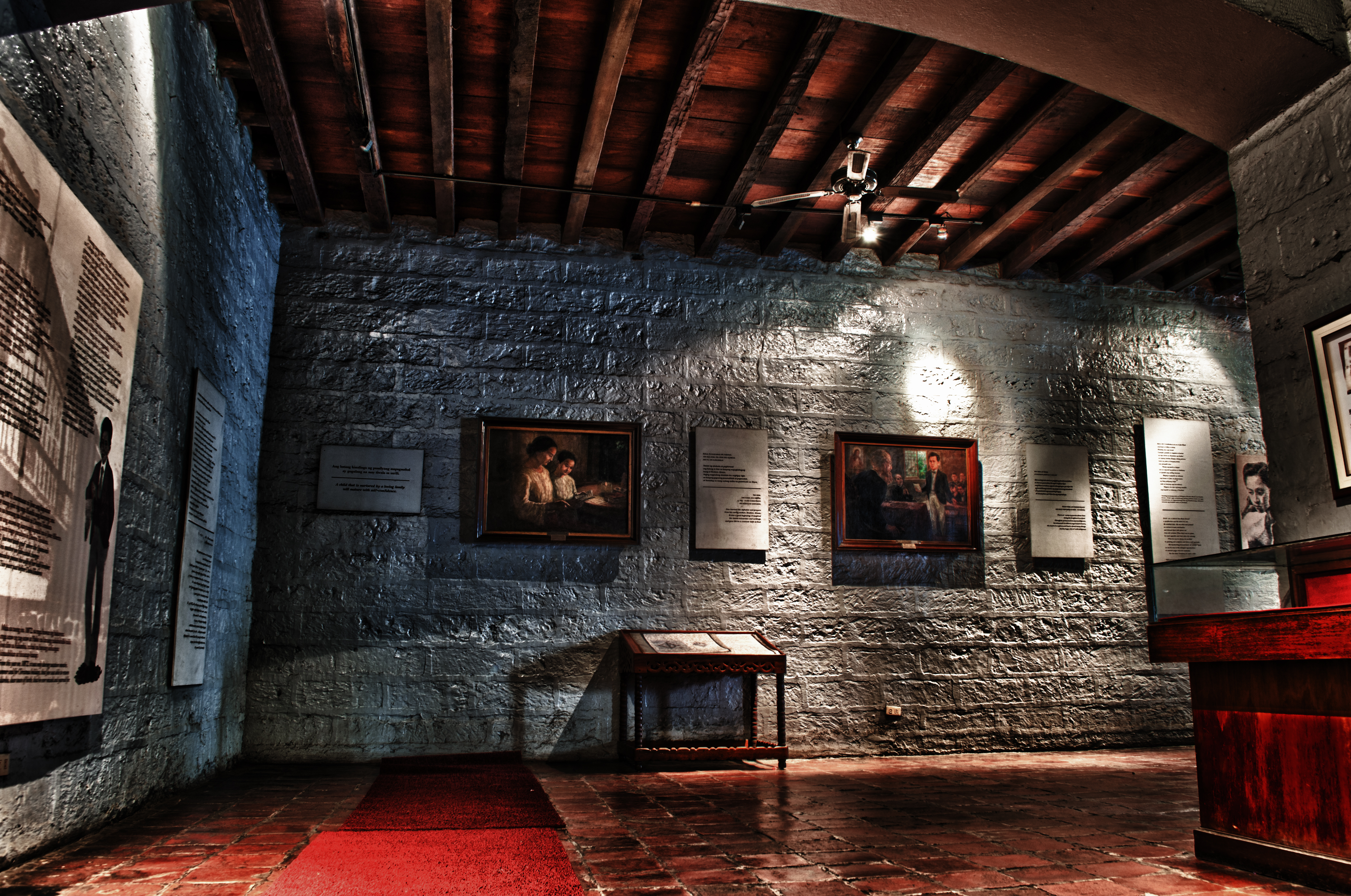
Inside the Rizal Shrine

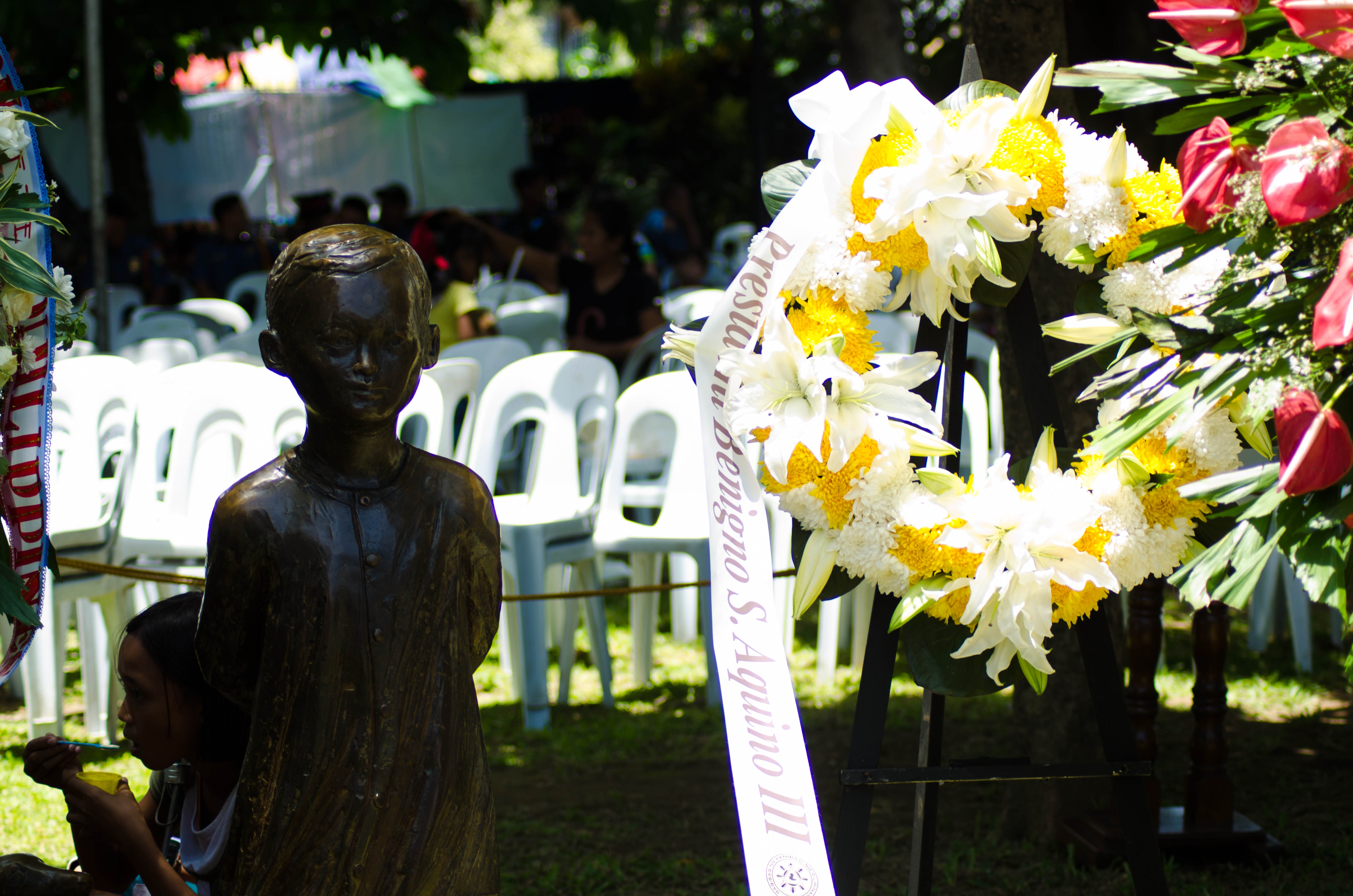
Statue of little Rizal

Built in 1997, a gallery, library, audio-visual room and shop of Rizal memorabilia reside adjacent to the shrine. The shrine has a large lawn with a replica of the nipa hut and a statue depicting young Rizal with his dog. The statue was constructed in 1996 by Dudley Diaz for the centennial celebration commemorating Rizal's death. The remains of Rizal's parents, Francisco Rizal Mercado and Teodora Alonso Realonda, are also interred in the shrine.

== See also ==
- Rizal Park
- Rizal Shrine (Intramuros)
- Rizal Shrine (Dapitan)

== Bibliography ==
- Historical Markers: Regions I-IV and CAR. Manila: National Historical Institute (Philippines). 1993. p. 382. ISBN 9715380611.
- Zaide, Gregorio; Zaide, Sonia (1997). Jose Rizal: Buhay, Mga Ginawa at Mga Sinulat ng isang Henyo, Manunulat, Siyentipiko at Pambansang Bayani (in Filipino). Quezon City: All Nations Publishing Co., Inc. pp. 8–9. ISBN 971-642-044-7.
