= Alberto Mansion =

Historic House

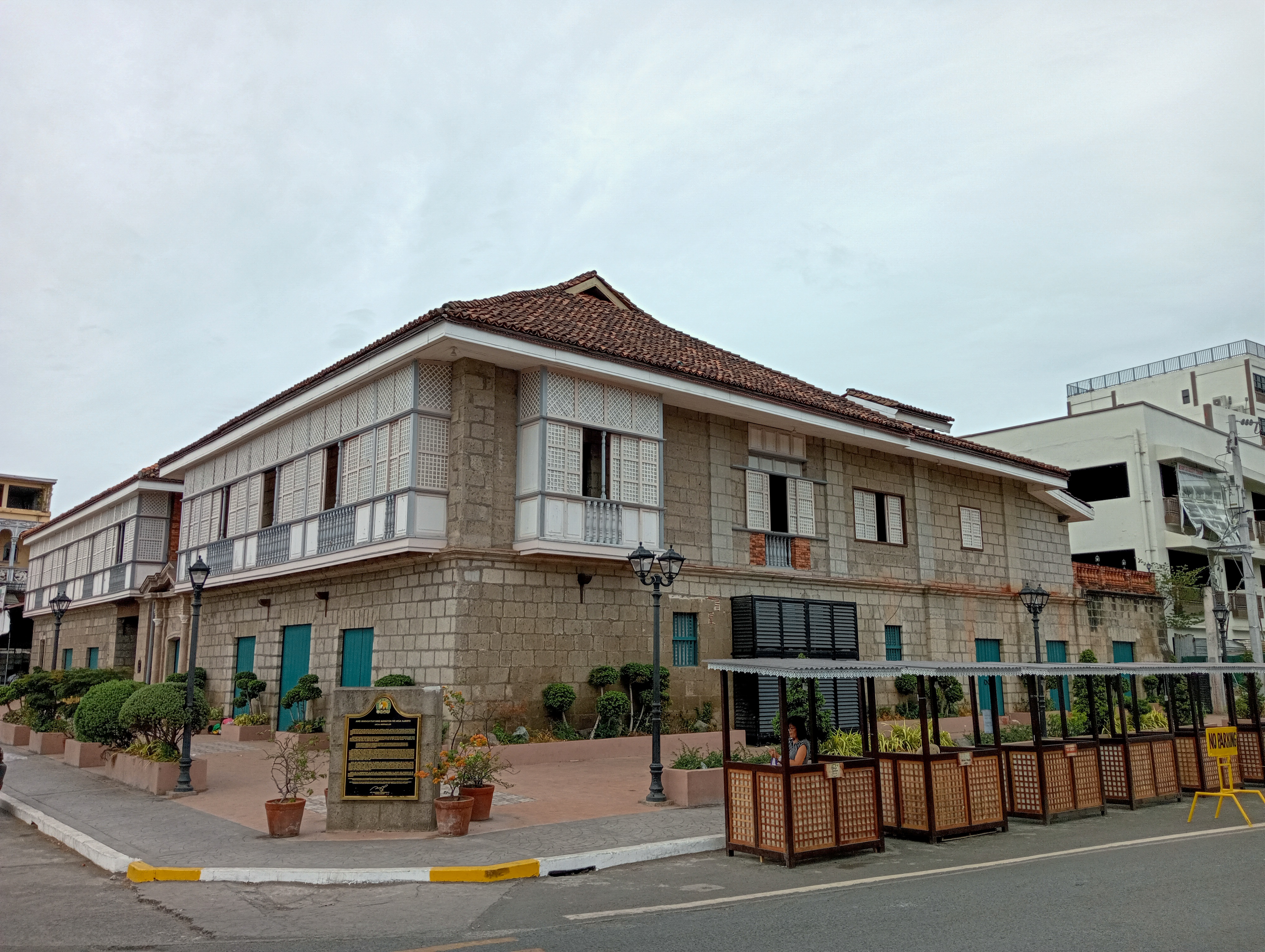
- The mansion in 2023
- Interactive map of the Alberto Mansion area

General information
- Status: Completed
- Architectural style: Bahay na bato
- Location: Biñan, Laguna, Philippines
- Coordinates: 14°20′20.8″N 121°05′04.0″E
- Completed: 1800s

Technical details
- Floor count: 2

The Alberto Mansion is a historic house in Biñan, Laguna, Philippines.

== History ==
The house was built around the 1800s and was owned by Jose Alberto Alonzo. The house is noted for its connection to the family of José Rizal. Alonzo is the father of Rizal's mother Teodora Alonso Realonda. Biñan is where Realonda would spend her teenage years and where she would meet Rizal's father Francisco Mercado who lived in a house nearby. The property would later be passed down through several generations.

The house also had other tenants such as Cipriano Alberto, who was Biñan mayor in 1790 and 1802; his son Lorenzo, who was also mayor in 1844; and grandson Jose, who was the Philippines' representative to the Spanish cortes.

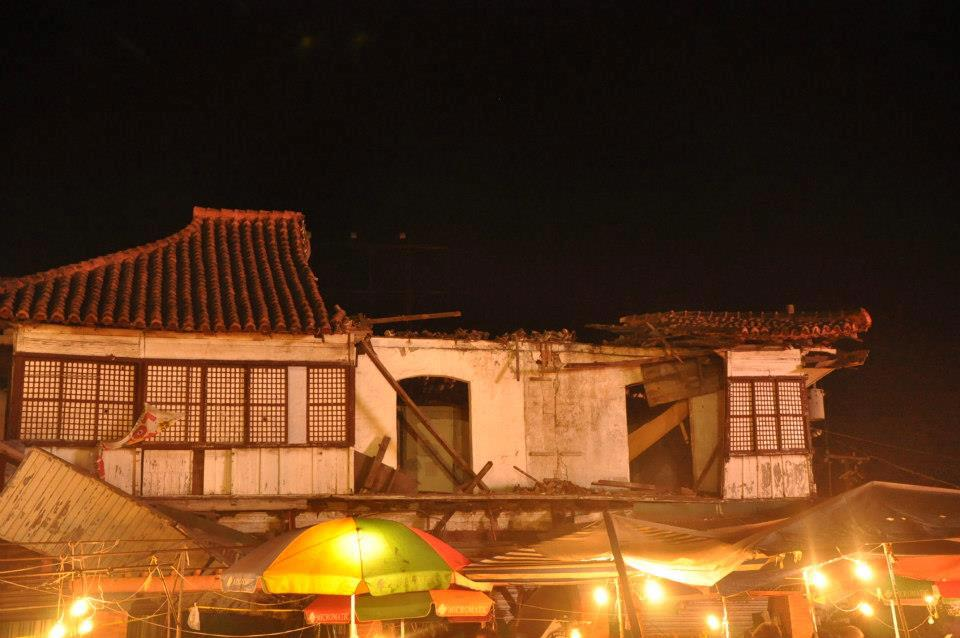
The collapse of the roof in 2012

In 2009 or 2010, the house was reportedly sold to Jose Acuzar by Gerardo Alberto, a fifth-generation descendant of the Jose Alberto Alonzo. Acuzar is the owner of Las Casas Filipinas de Acuzar, a resort in Bagac, Bataan known for incorporating heritage structures from other parts of the country. The Alonzo clan allowed for the house's full relocation to the Bataan resort but the move was opposed by the city government of Biñan. The Biñan government also offered to buy the property for ₱20 million but the owner reportedly declined the offer of the local government.

The Biñan city government also issued an ordinance in 2011 declaring the Alberto Mansion a heritage site. On October 21, 2012, the roof of the building collapsed, which is suspected to be as a result of dismantling the interior for transfer to the Acuzar resort in Bataan. The Biñan council also sought for the National Historical Commission of the Philippines to declare the building a National Historical Landmark to allow for its expropriation. Along with the Biñan local government, the United Artists for Cultural Conservation and Development, City of Biñan Inc. (UACCD) has advocated for the restoration of the house.

The expropriation process was delayed as the house owners negotiated with the Biñan government. The city government later alleged that owners were also having talks to another party to have the property leased for a Jollibee fast food outlet. The Biñan government then filed a expropriation case in May 2017. The expropriation was granted by the local court in the same year. The house was later restored; to as close as the original design as possible by the same construction firm which developed the Acuzar resort.

== Architecture and design ==
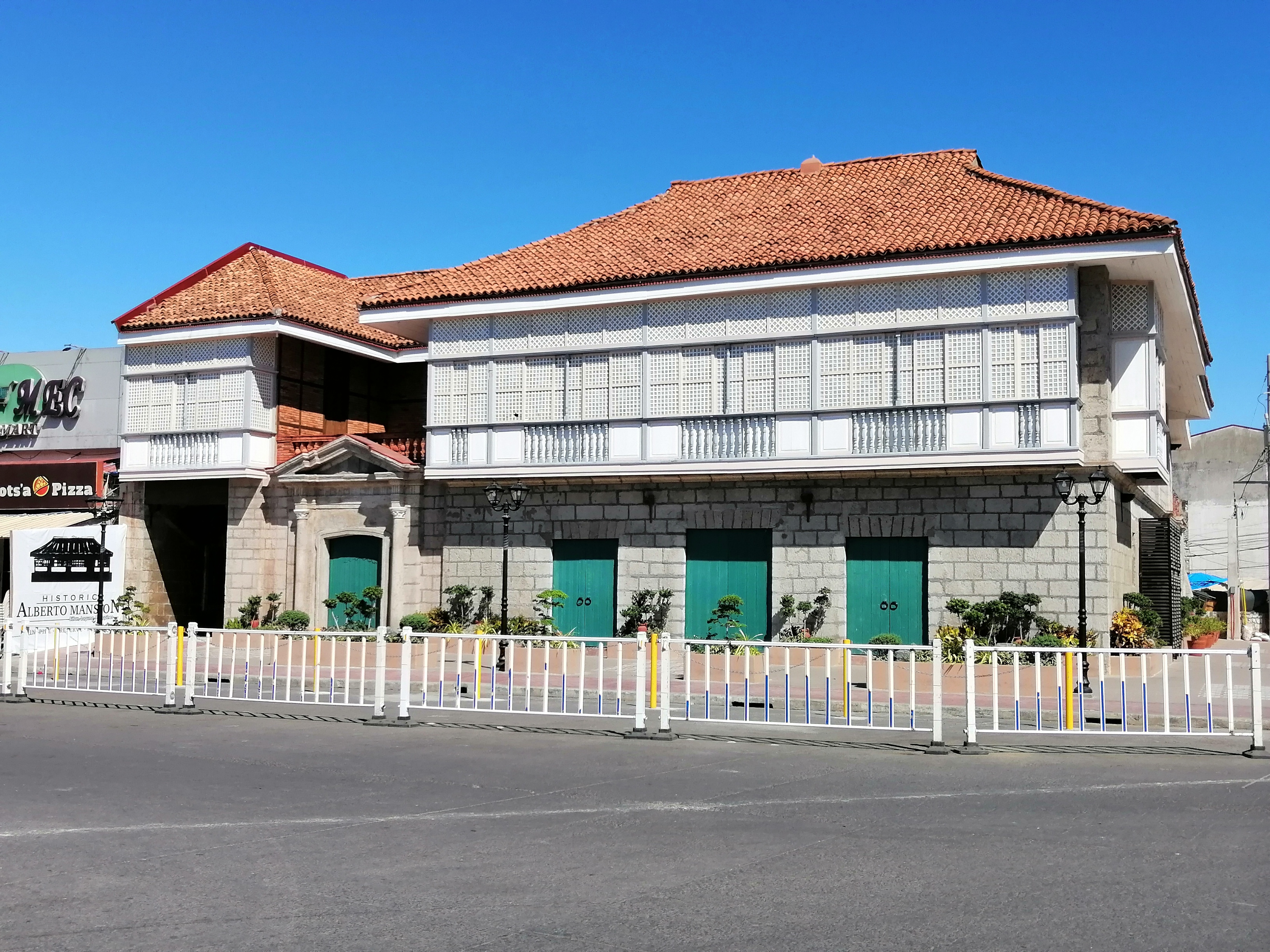
The mansion in 2020

The Alberto Mansion is a two-storey building with an area of 1,197 square meters (12,880 sq ft). The building is an example of a Bahay na Bato. According to the Biñan city government the structure was around 10 percent of the original prior to the 2012 roof collapse. It is situated in front of the Sentrong Pangkultura ng Biñan, which is also the former Biñan Municipal Hall.
