= Battle of Calamba =

Battle of Calamba Revolution in Laguna
- Part of the Philippine Revolution
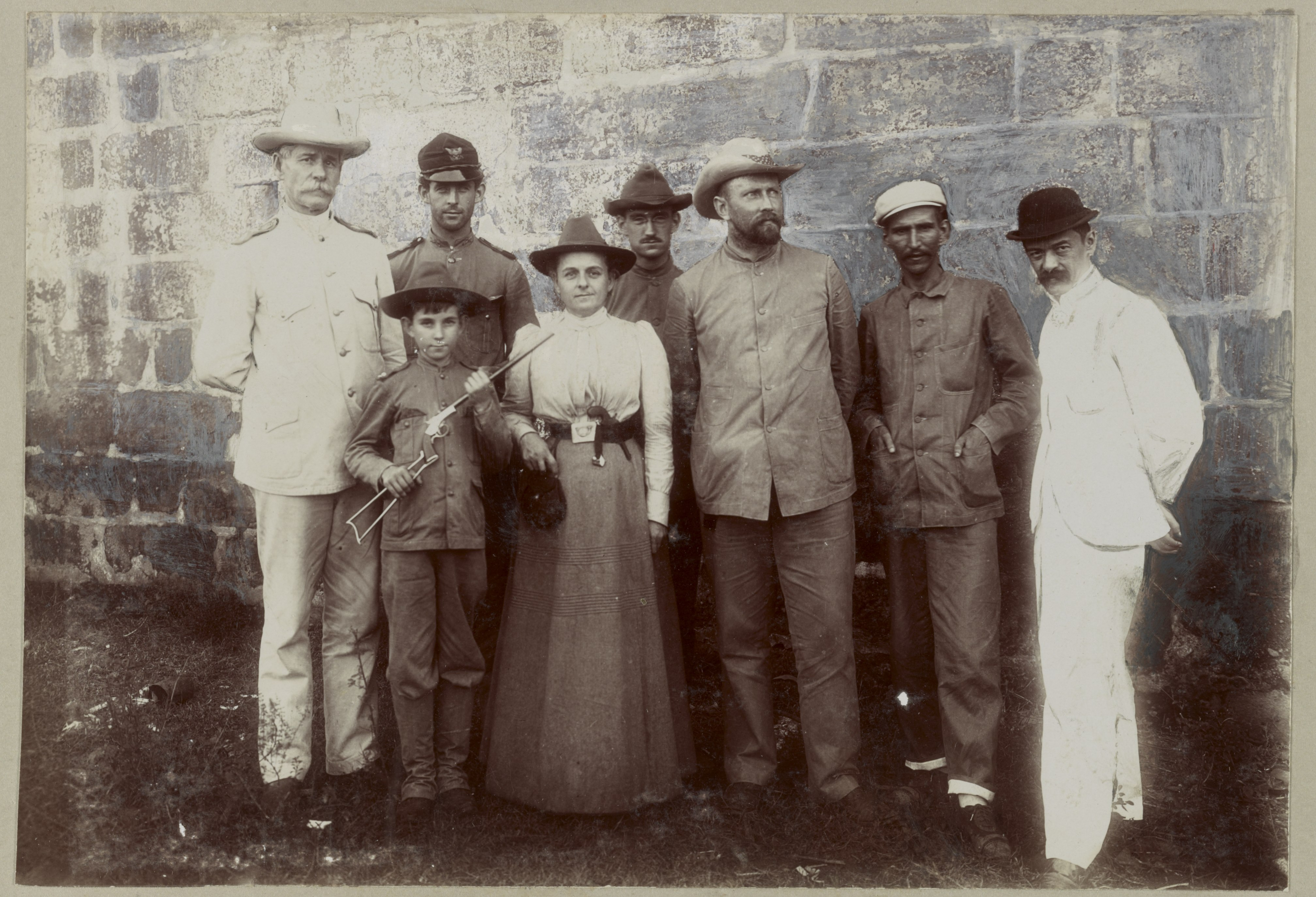
- Morning after the Battle of Calamba
Date	May 1898
Location	Calamba, La Laguna, Philippines
Result	Filipino victory

Belligerents
Filipino Revolutionaries	Spanish Empire

Commanders and leaders
Paciano Rizal; Pio del Pilar	Basilio Augustín

Strength
400 men	60 men

Casualties and losses
Unknown	Surrender of entire force

The Battle of Calamba (Filipino: Labanan sa Calamba, Spanish: Batalla de Calamba) was fought between Filipino Revolutionaries in La Laguna (present-day Laguna) in the Philippines and the colonial forces of the Spanish Empire.

== Background ==
Emilio Aguinaldo had returned from exile in Hong Kong and was amassing a large force to drive out the Spanish from Cavite. General Leopoldo Garcia Peña, the Spanish military commander at Cavite, was hard-pressed with roughly 3,000 Spanish troops scattered in various detachments in Cavite. The combined forces of Generals Luciano San Miguel, Mariano Noriel, Artemio Ricarte and Juan Cailles, having with them about 6,000–8,000 troops, who began attacking and decimating Peña's units one by one. With the war of liberation once again in full swing, Laguna was soon also subsumed by waves of revolutionary fervor, and surely enough rebel armies were quickly formed in an effort to liberate the province from Spanish control. One of such forces was led by General Paciano Rizal, brother of political activist and writer Jose Rizal, with his command of 400 men-at-arms.

== Battle ==
Initially, the Spanish garrison in Calamba, numbering to 60 riflemen, holed up in the town church. They chose to wait as the Filipinos besieged the church. Lacking guns, and lacking even more ammunition, Rizal devised a ploy to get the Spaniards to surrender, he ordered that every time the Filipino column opened fire on the church, other troops, those without guns, would light up firecrackers to create the illusion that the Filipinos had plenty of guns. This fooled the Spanish detachment, and as a result surrendered shortly thereafter.

== Aftermath ==
With the surrender of the Spanish detachment at Calamba, Paciano Rizal had a free hand to head with his force to Santa Cruz, the capital of La Laguna, and by then the last town still under Spanish control, joining with other commanders present there.
