= Trinidad Rizal =

Filipina feminist organizer

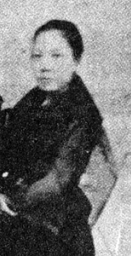
- Born: Trinidad Rizal y Alonso; June 6, 1868; Calamba, La Laguna, Captaincy General of the Philippines, Spanish Empire
- Died: May 9, 1951 (aged 82); Manila, Philippines
- Burial place: Original internment: Manila North Cemetery; Reinterred: Paciano Rizal Shrine, Los Baños, Laguna
- Known for: Co-founder of Asociación Feminista Filipina
- Parents: Francisco Rizal Mercado (father); Teodora Alonso Realonda (mother)
- Relatives: Saturnina Hidalgo (sister); Paciano Rizal (brother); José Rizal (brother)

Trinidad Rizal Mercado y Alonso Realonda (June 6, 1868 – May 9, 1951), commonly known as Trinidad Rizal and Trining, was a Filipina feminist leader and co-founder of the Philippines' first feminist organization, of the Asociación Feminista Filipina. She was the tenth sibling of the national hero, physician and writer, Dr. José Rizal. She’s the only sibling of José to survive World War II and live to witness Philippine independence in 1946.

== Life and work ==
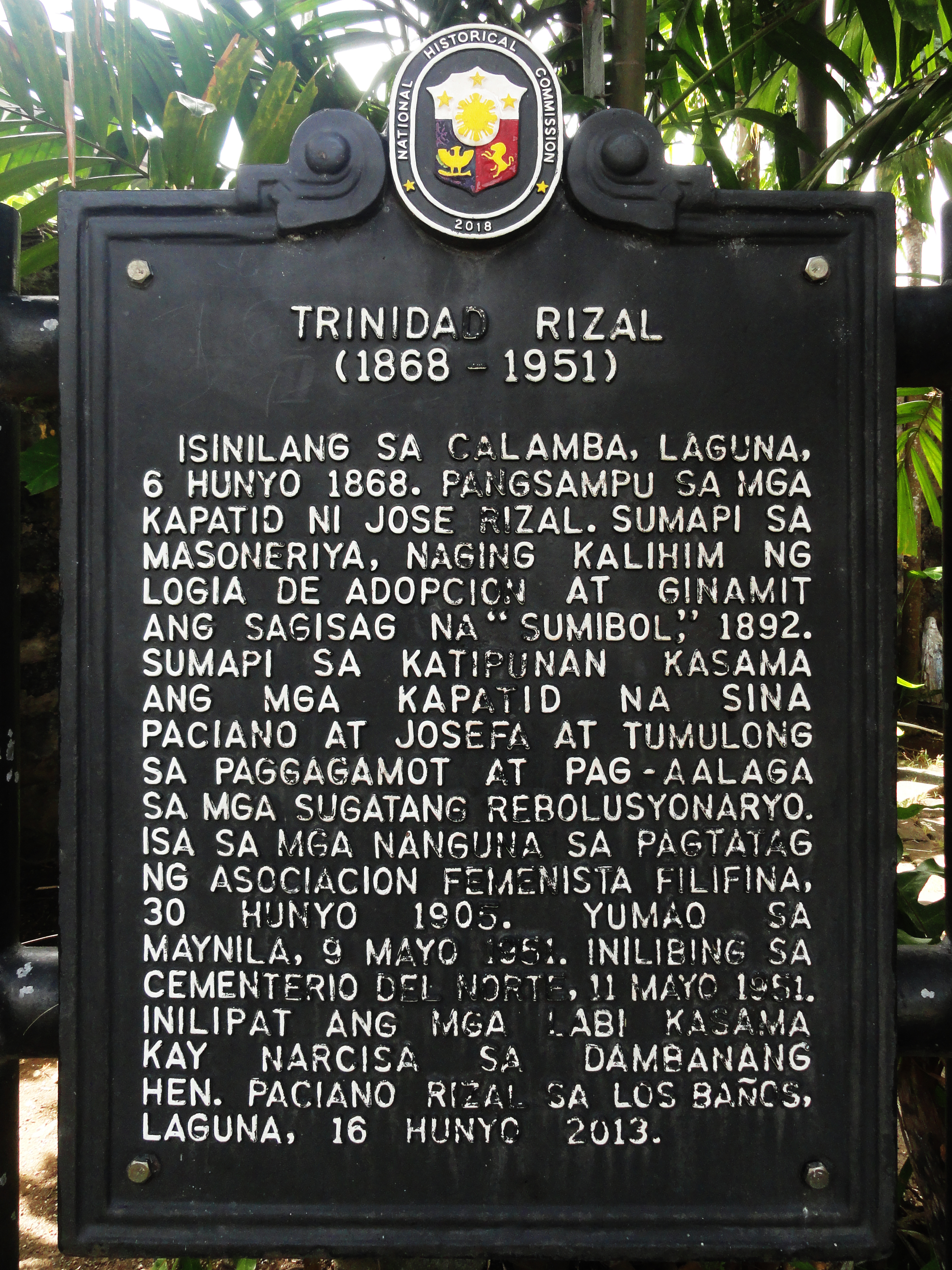
National Historical Commission of the Philippines marker honoring Trinidad Rizal, located in Los Baños, Laguna

Trinidad was born in Calamba, La Laguna (present-day Laguna), on June 6, 1868. She was the tenth child of Francisco Rizal Mercado and Teodora Alonso Realonda.

Trinidad helped found the first Masonic lodge for women in the Philippines. She was also a member of Walana, a Filipino masonry society, formed in Manila on July 18, 1893, closely allied with the masonic temples of the ilustrados.

In 1905, Trinidad co-founded the first Filipina feminist organization, the Asociación Feminista Filipina (AFF), along with Concepción Felix, Librada Avelino, María Paz Guanzon, and Luisa de Silyar, among others. In addition to encouraging women to participate in politics and public service, the organization promoted women's health. Trinidad participated in a subproject of AFF, Gota de Leche (also called La Protección de la Infancia), which focused on improving reproductive and maternal, infant, and child health.

Like her sister, Josefa Rizal, Trinidad never married. She died in Manila on May 9, 1951. She was buried in Manila's North Cemetery (Cemeterio del Norte) on May 11, 1951. Her remains were later exhumed, along with those of her siblings Paciano and Josefa, and relocated to the General Paciano Rizal shrine in Los Baños, Laguna.

== Relationship with José Rizal ==
In a letter from Germany, dated March 11, 1886, her brother, José, complained of not having heard from her. He went on to praise the intelligent simplicity of German women and urged Trinidad to take her studies seriously while still in her youth, lamenting that Trinidad was "dominated by indolence." The letter, written a couple months before her eighteenth birthday, revealed that José had not seen his sister since she was very young.

Trinidad and her sisters sought information about birth control, breast feeding, and pain reduction during childbirth from brother, José, while he studied in Europe to become a doctor.

Trinidad visited José the day before his execution, accompanying their mother, Teodora Alonso, and sisters Lucía, Josefa, María, and Narcisa, to say goodbye and collect his belongings. Several historical accounts tell that José gave his stove (others call it a lamp) to Trinidad, telling her something important lay inside. Legend has it that this important something was her brother's last poem, "Mi último adiós" / "My last farewell." He had hidden the paper so well that his sisters had to use their hairpins to unfold it.

Before his death, José wrote to Trinidad to express his wish that the Rizal family treat his common-law wife, Josephine Bracken, kindly for her devotion to him. Following his execution, Trinidad accompanied Josephine and brother, Paciano, to Cavite where they met revolutionary leader Andrés Bonifacio and passed to him a copy of José's final poem.

In 1908, the U.S. government informed the Philippine government that an American collector owned the original manuscript of the poem, which had left the Philippines with Josephine Bracken in 1897. The United States now wanted to sell the document to the Philippine government for $500. Trinidad verified the manuscript as the original before the Philippines purchased and placed it in the Philippine National Library.
