= Francisco Rizal Mercado =

Father of Jose Rizal

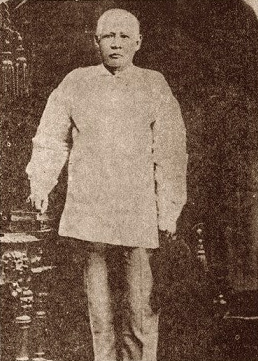
- Born: Francisco Engracio Mercado y Alejandro; May 11, 1818; Biñan, La Laguna, Captaincy General of the Philippines, Spanish Empire
- Died: January 5, 1898 (aged 79); Manila, Captaincy General of the Philippines, Spanish Empire
- Resting place: Rizal Shrine, Calamba, Laguna
- Spouse: Teodora Alonso y Quintos (m. 1848)
- Children: 11 (including Saturnina, Paciano, José, and Trinidad)

Francisco Engracio Rizal Mercado y Alejandro (born Francisco Engracio Mercado y Alejandro; May 11, 1818 – January 5, 1898) was the father of the Philippines' national hero Jose Rizal. He was born in Biñan, La Laguna (present-day Laguna). He had a wife named Teodora Realonda y Quintos and had 11 children altogether.

== Early life ==
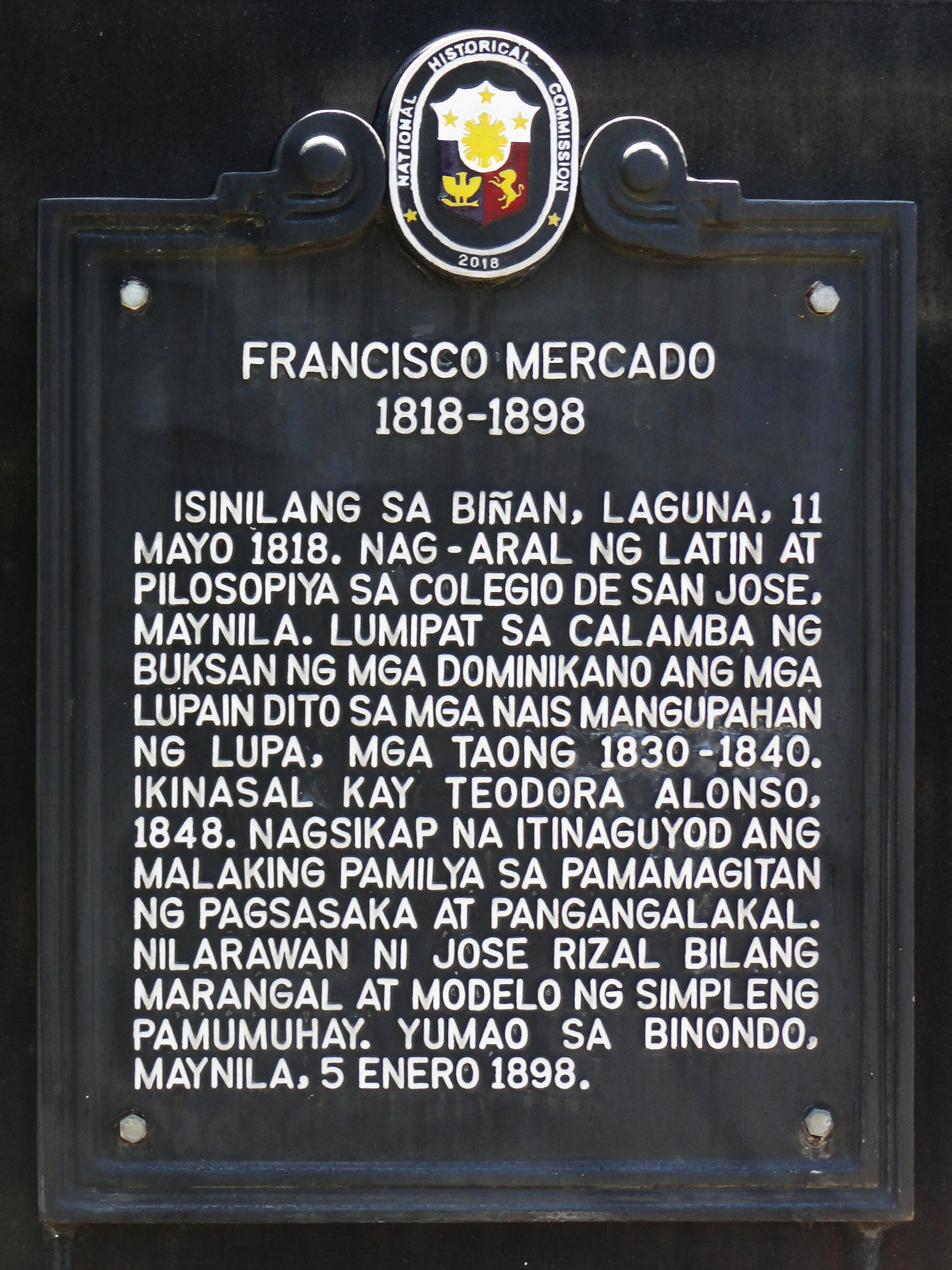
NHCP historical marker installed in 2018 on the bicentenary of Mercado's birth

He was one of the children of Juan Monica Mercado and Cirila Alejandro. His family had adopted the additional surnames of Rizal in 1849, after Governor-General Narciso Clavería y Zaldúa decreed the adoption of Spanish surnames among the Filipinos for census purposes (though they already had Spanish names).

Like many families in the Philippines, the Rizals were of mestizo origin. Francisco's patrilineal lineage could be traced to Fujian in China through his father's ancestor Lam-Co, a Hokkien Chinese merchant who immigrated to the Philippines in the late 17th century. (Note: When José was baptized, the record showed his parents as Francisco Rizal Mercado and Teodora Realonda."José Rizal’s Lineage") Lam-Co traveled to Manila from Xiamen, China, possibly to avoid the famine or plague in his home district, and more probably to escape the Manchu invasion during the Transition from Ming to Qing. He decided to stay in the islands as a farmer. In 1697, to escape the bitter anti-Chinese prejudice that existed in the Philippines, he converted to Catholicism, changed his name to Domingo Mercado and married the daughter of Chinese friend Augustin Chin-co.

Francisco Rizal was only eight years old when his father died. He attended a Latin school in Biñan, which his sons would later attend. He also attended the Colegio de San Jose in Manila, where he studied Latin and philosophy. He was described by Rafael Palma: "He was 40, of solid shoulders, strong constitution, rather tall than short, of serious and reflective mien, with prominent forehead and large dark eyes. A pure Filipino."

== Personal life ==
Francisco married Teodora Alonso on June 28, 1848, when he was 30 years old. The couple resided in La Laguna, particularly in Calamba, and built a business in agriculture.

== Death ==
Francisco died on January 5, 1898, more than a year after the execution of his son José. His remains were initially interred at Cementerio del Norte in Manila before being transferred alongside the remains of his wife Teodora to their current grave at his residence (now the Rizal Shrine) in Calamba, Laguna.

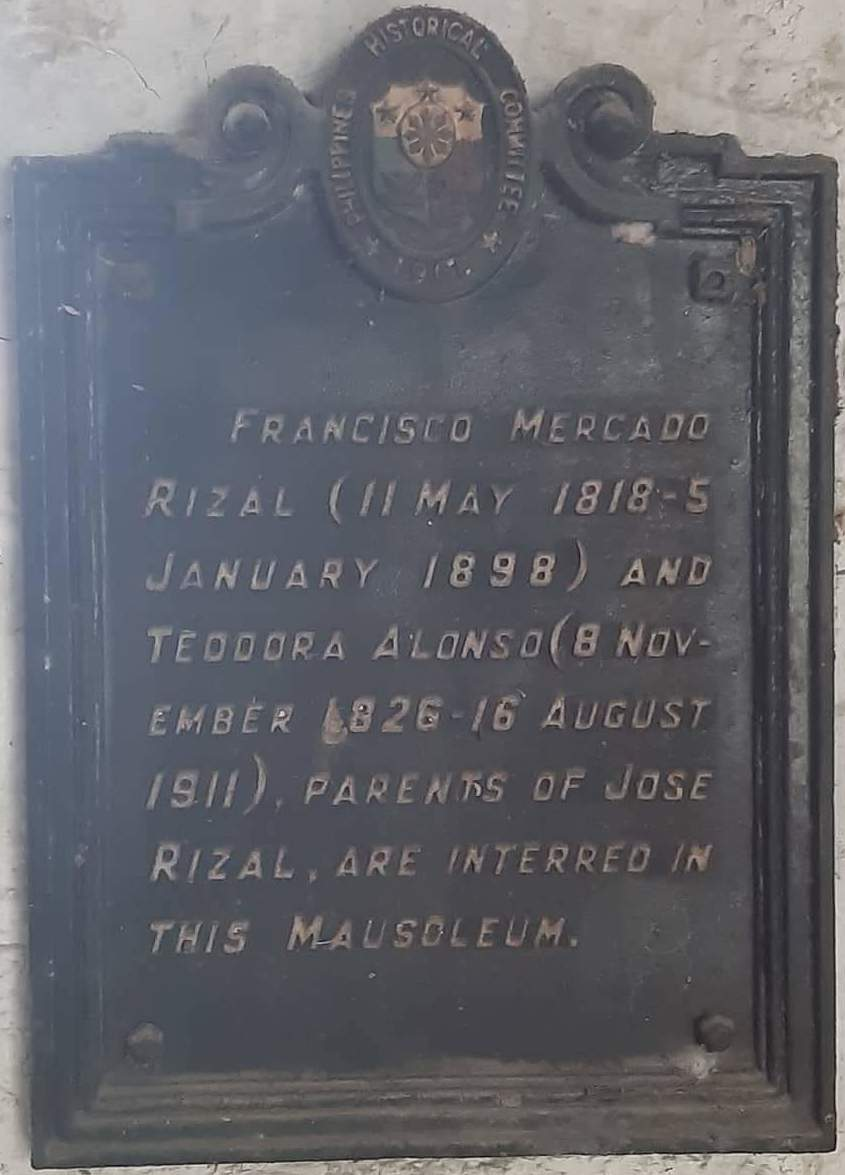
Historical marker marking the original tomb of Francisco Mercado and Teodora Alonso at the Manila North Cemetery

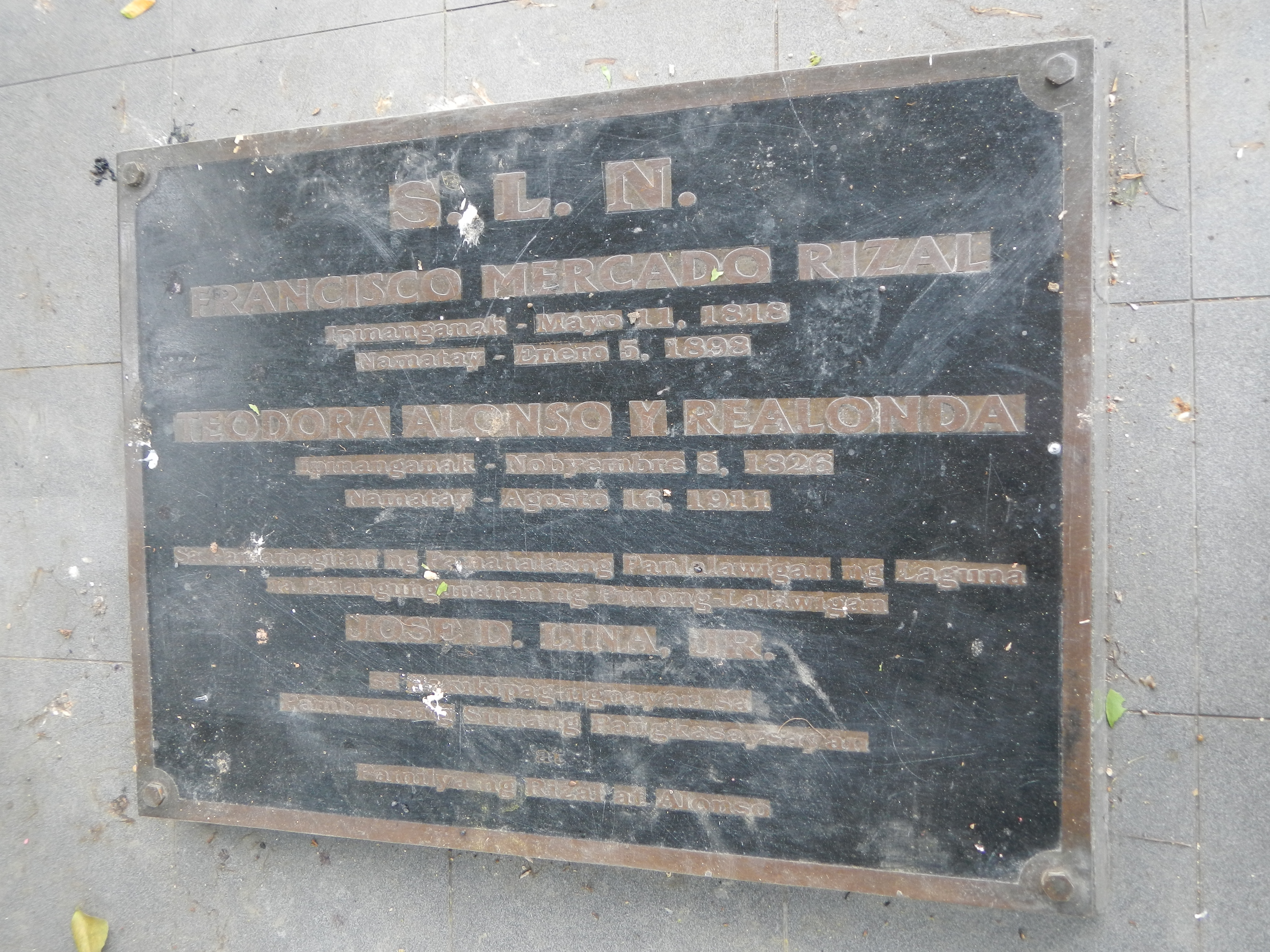
The current grave of Francisco Mercado and Teodora Alonso at the Rizal Shrine in Calamba City, Laguna.
