= Teodora Alonso Realonda =

Mother of Josè Rizal (1827–1911)

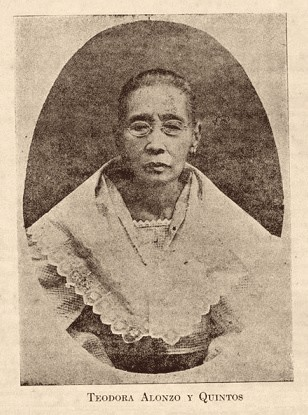
- Born: Teodora Alonso y Quintos; November 9, 1827; Santa Cruz, Manila, Captaincy General of the Philippines
- Died: August 16, 1911 (aged 83); San Nicolas, Manila, Philippine Islands
- Resting place: Rizal Shrine
- Spouse: Francisco Mercado y Alejandro (m. 1848; died 1898)
- Children: 11 (including Saturnina, Paciano, José, and Trinidad)

Teodora Alonso Realonda y Quintos (born Teodora Alonso y Quintos; November 9, 1827 – August 16, 1911) was a wealthy woman in the Spanish colonial Philippines. She was best known as the mother of the Philippines' national hero Jose Rizal. Realonda was born in Santa Cruz, Manila. She was also known for being a disciplinarian and hard-working mother. Her medical condition inspired Rizal to take up medicine.

== Early life ==
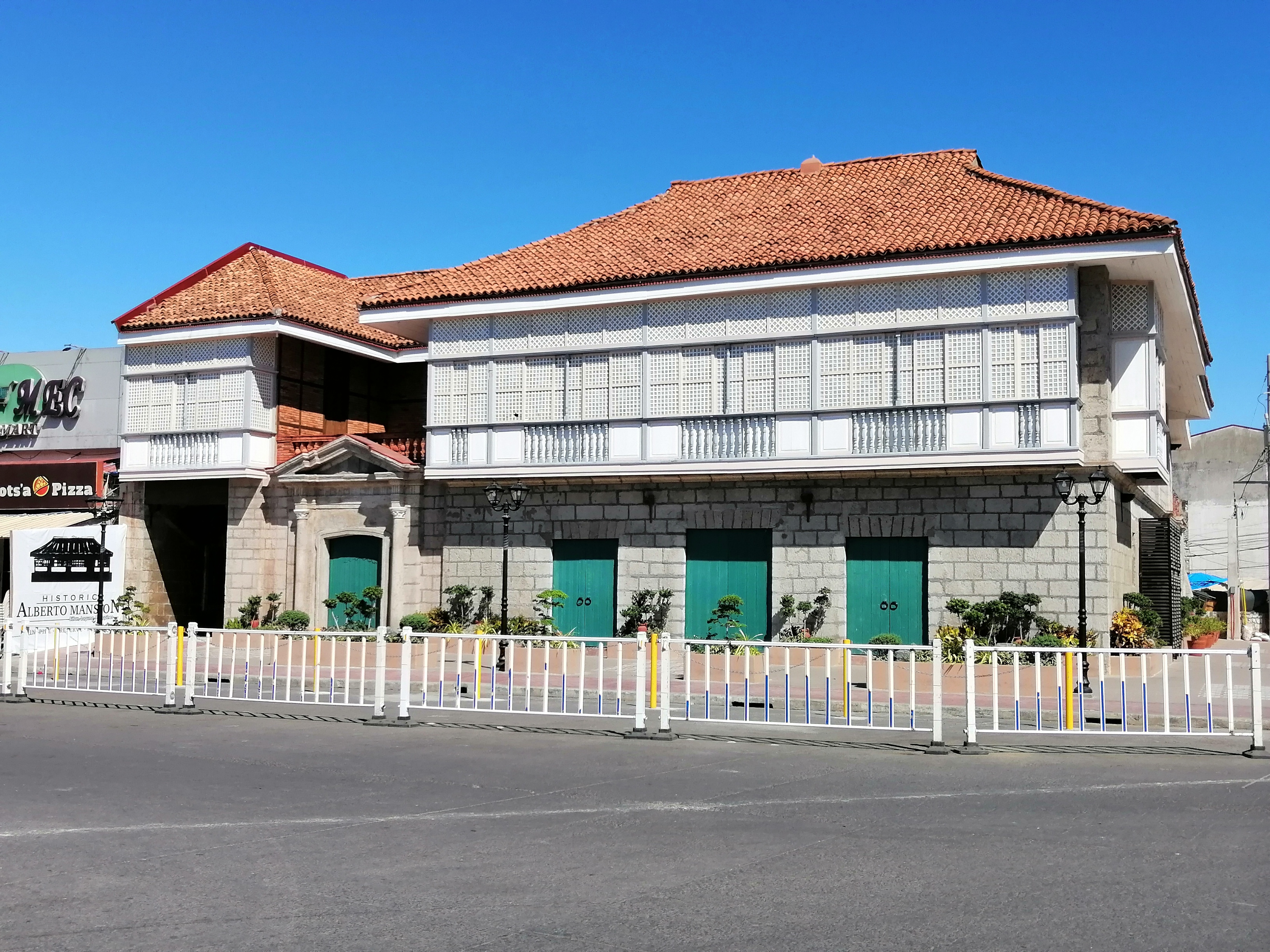
Alberto Mansion in Biñan, where Alonso grew up

Teodora Alonso was the second child of Lorenzo Alberto Alonso, a municipal captain in Biñan, La Laguna (present-day Laguna), and Brijida de Quintos. Her family had adopted additional surname Realonda in 1849, after Governor General Narciso Clavería y Zaldúa decreed the adoption of Spanish surnames among the Filipinos for census purposes (though they already had Spanish names).

Teodora's ancestry included Chinese, Japanese, and Tagalog. Her lineage can be traced to the affluent Florentina family of Chinese mestizo families originating in Baliuag, Bulacan. She also had Spanish ancestry from both of her parents. Her maternal grandmother, Regina Ochoa, had mixed Spanish, Chinese ancestry as well as ancestry from Pangasinan and Tagalog regions.

Teodora Alonso was also a representative in the Spanish Courts and a pious Catholic, being a Knight of the Order of Isabella. Quintos was an educated woman, who became a housewife, devoted to caring for her family's needs. Realonda came from a financially able family and studied at the Colegio de Santa Rosa in Manila, just like her mother who was well-bred and had an educational background in the subjects of mathematics and literature.

== Personal life ==
Teodora married Francisco Mercado, a native of Biñan, La Laguna, on June 28, 1848, when she was 20 years old. The couple resided in La Laguna, particularly in Calamba and built a business from agriculture. She was an industrious and educated woman, managing the family's farm and finances. Teodora used her knowledge to grow the rice, corn, and sugarcane that sustained the family's well-to-do lifestyle. She also expanded the family business into the areas of textiles, flour, and sugar milling, refining these raw materials and selling the finished staples from a small store on the ground floor of the family home.

Teodora had eleven children with Francisco. They are Saturnina, Paciano, Narcisa, Olympia, Lucia, Maria, José, Concepcion, Josefa, Trinidad and Soledad. All her children were sent to study in different colleges in Manila, but only José was sent to Europe as he was inspired to study medicine, particularly ophthalmology, to help his mother due to her failing eyesight.

José honored his mother in Memoirs of a Student in Manila, writing, "After God, the mother is everything to man."

Teodora’s half-brother, Jose Alberto, wanted to divorce his wife, whom he alleged to be having an affair with another man. Teodora persuaded him to put up with her and preserve their marriage. Since then Jose Alberto went often to Calamba to seek advice from Teodora. This was learned by his wife who then suspected Jose Alberto and Teodora plotting something evil to her. Later Jose’s wife and an officer of the Guardia Civil (presumably the same one who was refused horse fodder) then accused Jose Alberto and Teodora of trying to poison Jose Alberto’s wife. Teodora was named as an accomplice to Jose Alberto, the main suspect. Quick like a bolt of lightning, Teodora was hauled to jail by the mayor, Antonio Vivencio del Rosario, a known yes-man of the friars. A judge who did not like the way he was treated at the Mercado-Rizal house, ordered that Teodora be imprisoned in Santa Cruz, the capital of the province. She was made to walk the distance, though usual travel was by boat. She was forbidden to use any vehicle, although her family was willing to pay for it and include her escorts for the ride. She was to suffer humiliation and hardship as prescribed by those her family had offended. On the first night of the journey to Santa Cruz, Teodora and her escorts came to a village where there was a festival. Teodora was recognized and invited by one of the prominent families. The judge, upon learning that Teodora was honored in the village, was enraged. He went to the house she visited. There was a guard there and the judge knocked and broke his cane on the poor man’s head then beat up the owner of the house. This obvious case of prejudice was reported by Teodora’s lawyers. The Supreme Court decided to set her free. The cruel judge respected the decision but then charged Teodora with contempt of court. To this, the Supreme Court was persuaded but since Teodora’s wait in prison was longer than the sentence, ordered her release. Then the lawyer of Jose Alberto charged Teodora with theft. There was rumor that Teodora borrowed money from her brother. The lawyer obviously was interested in recovering the money for himself. This case was heard but dismissed by the court. Teodora was coerced to make a plea of guilt of which she was promised a pardon, immediate freedom and reunion with her family. It was all for naught. Teodora finally regained freedom after two and a half years, as ordered by none other than the Governor General, who was charmed one fiesta day in Laguna by a daring little girl. So charmed was he that he asked the little girl what she would like him to give her. "My mother", was the reply. The little girl was Soledad, Teodora’s youngest daughter. This led to an inquiry and a new trial that ended in Teodora’s acquittal.

== After Rizal's death ==
In August 1898, Narcisa got the body of her brother Rizal, and found out that the body was not even laid out in a coffin. Because of this, the government offered Teodora a lifetime pension as a token of gratitude, after Rizal was declared the national hero of the Philippines. However, she declined the offer, as she said that her family "has never been patriotic for money." She even saw the declaration of the monument for Rizal a week before she died. Alonso died in her home at 478 San Fernando Street, San Nicolas, Manila on August 16, 1911. Her remains were interred at a mausoleum in Cementerio del Norte, Manila, joining that of her husband Francisco, before being transferred to their current graves at the Rizal Shrine in Calamba, Laguna.

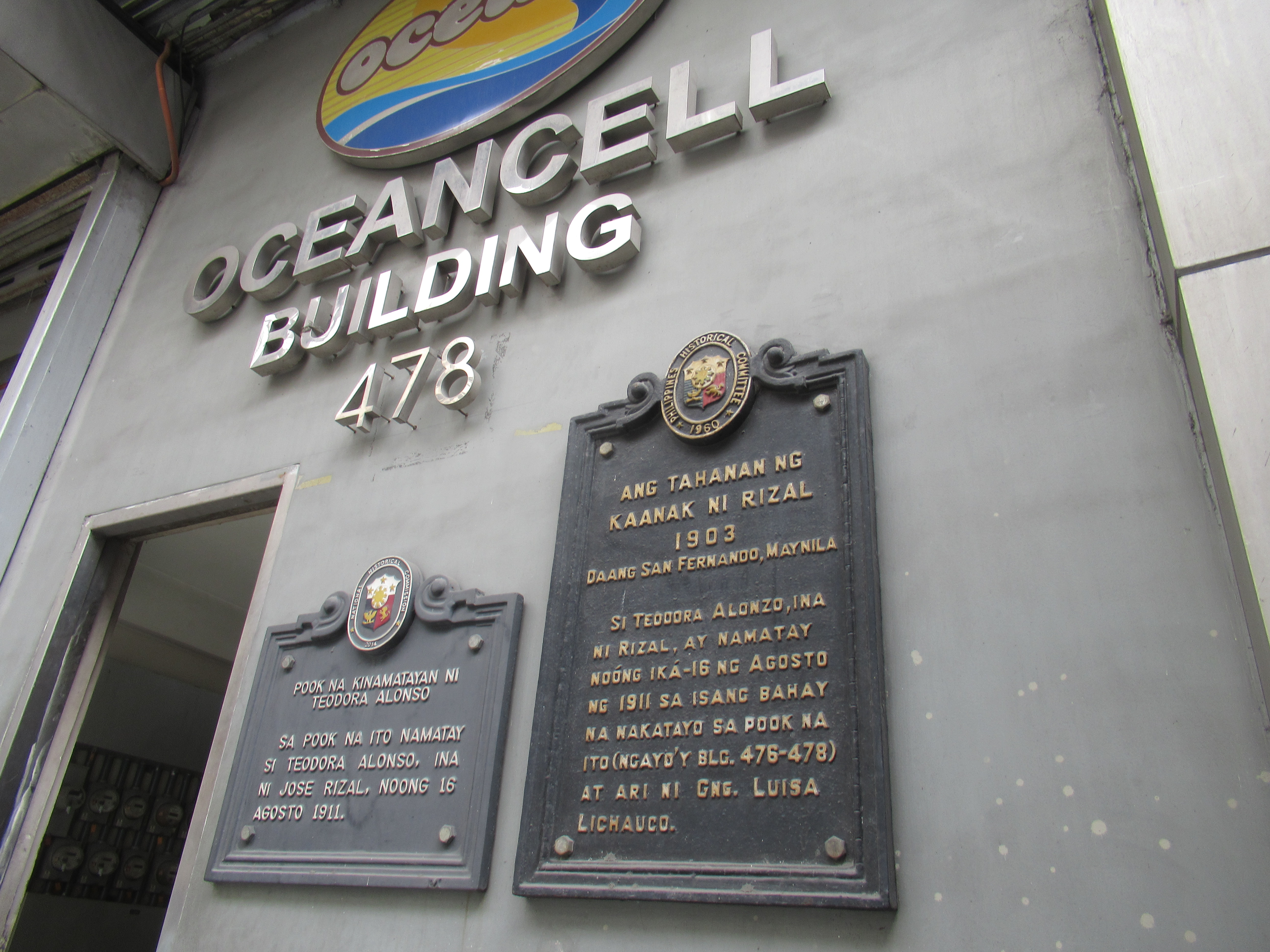
Historical markers in Tagalog marking the former site of the house at 478 San Fernando Street in San Nicolas, Manila where Alonso died

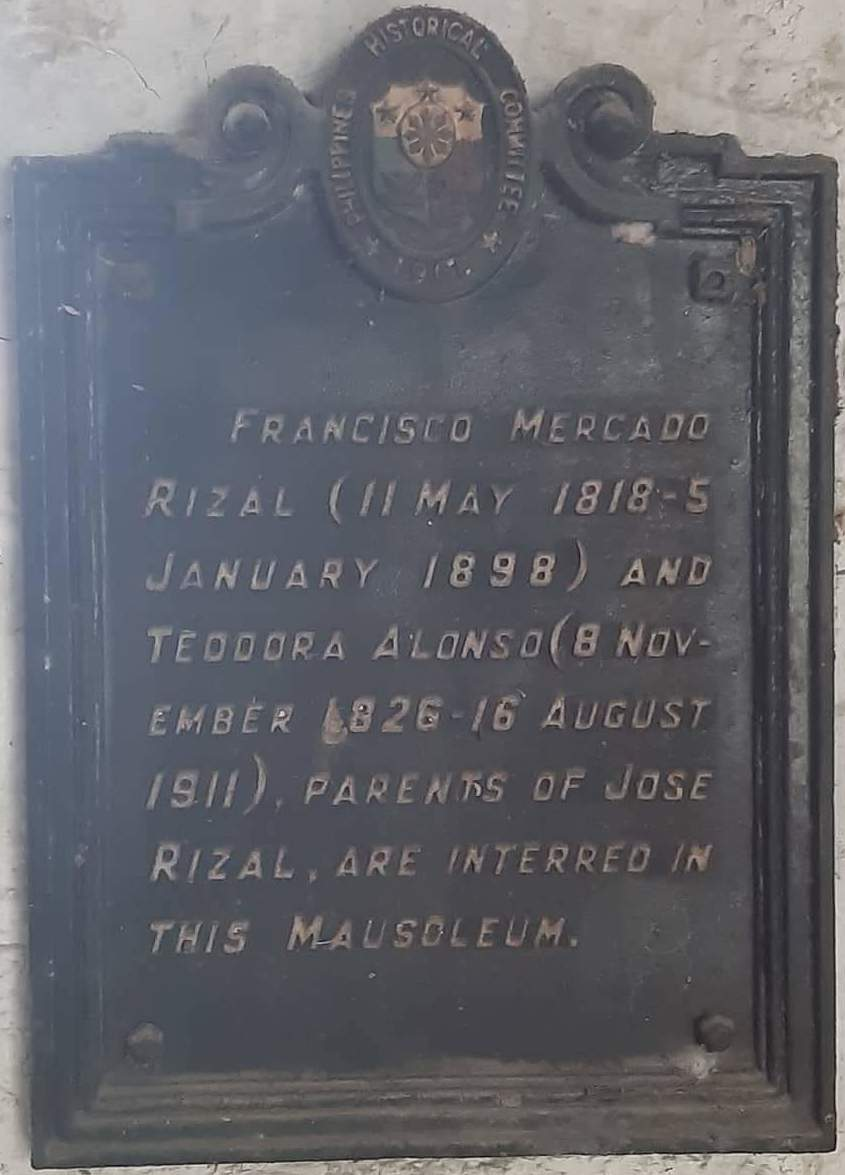
Historical marker marking the original tomb of Francisco Mercado and Teodora Alonso at the Manila North Cemetery

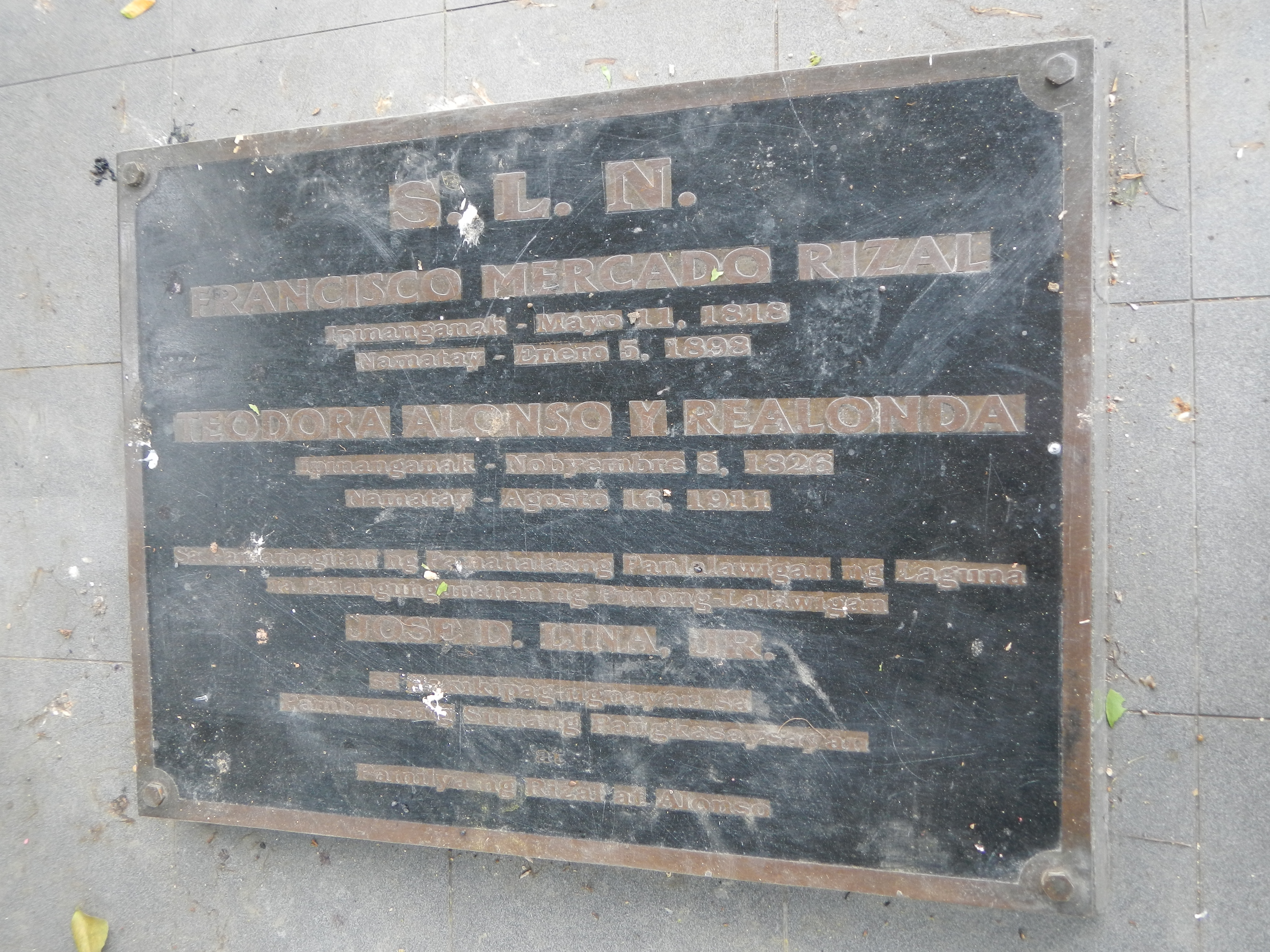
The current grave of Francisco Mercado and Teodora Alonso at the Rizal Shrine in Calamba City, Laguna.
Image of Teodora Alonso at 80 years old

== Role in the life of José Rizal ==
Teodora Alonso was a woman of learning. She could read, write, and do arithmetic; she was knowledgeable in literature and proficient in speaking different languages, a talent that Jose Rizal also inherited. As Jose Rizal’s first teacher, she told captivating stories to make learning the alphabet enjoyable and stimulate her children’s imagination. She was also the first to recognize Rizal’s talent for poetry, encouraging him to write verses. She also read to him the fable of the moth and the flame, which Rizal never forgot throughout his life. Her teaching involved not only reading and arithmetic, but also how to think.

When she was arrested and forced to walk more than 30 kilometers to prison, the experience left a lasting mark on her son, as reflected numerous times in Rizal’s writings. In August 1893, she and her daughter Maria arrived in Dapitan and stayed at Rizal’s house for a year and a half. Rizal did the operation on her right eye because she had an eye ailment, which was the reason why Rizal was motivated to study medicine. The operation was successful, yet, Doña Teodora removed the bandage against her son’s instructions, which led to an infection.

On the eve of Rizal’s execution, his mother and siblings visited him. During this time, he finished writing the “Mi Último Adiós” (My Last Farewell) and concealed the poem inside a small alcohol stove, which he gave to his family.
