= Paciano Rizal =

Filipino general and revolutionary

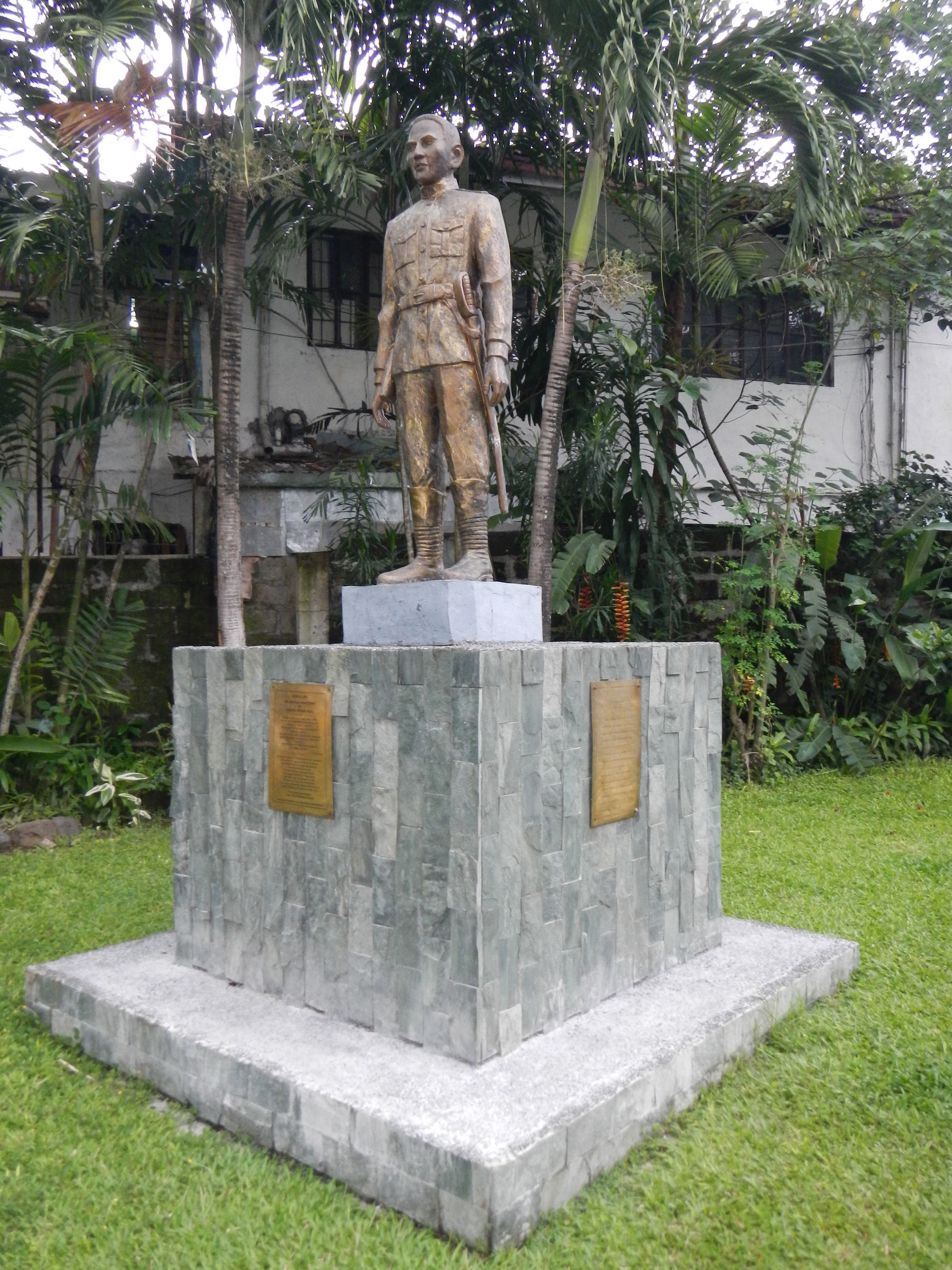
- General Paciano Rizal Monument, Tomb, Park and Shrine
- Born: Paciano Rizal Mercado y Alonso Realonda; March 9, 1851; Calamba, La Laguna, Captaincy General of the Philippines, Spanish Empire
- Died: April 13, 1930 (aged 79); Los Baños, Laguna, Insular Government of the Philippine Islands, United States
- Burial place: Paciano Rizal Shrine; Los Baños, Laguna, Philippines
- Relatives: Francisco Rizal Mercado (father); Teodora Alonso Realonda (mother); Saturnina Hidalgo (sister); José Rizal (brother); Trinidad Rizal (sister)
- Military career
- Allegiance: First Philippine Republic; Republic of Biak-na-Bato; Katipunan
- Branch: Philippine Revolutionary Army
- Service years: 1897–1900
- Rank: Brigadier general
- Conflicts: Philippine War of Independence; Battle of Calamba; Philippine–American War

Paciano Rizal Mercado y Alonso Realonda (March 9, 1851 – April 13, 1930) was a Filipino general and revolutionary, and the older brother of José Rizal. Paciano Rizal was born on March 9, 1851, in Calamba, Laguna. He was sent to Biñan to study Latin and was subsequently enrolled at the San José College in Manila. Paciano befriended Priest José Burgos and resided in his home. The 1872 Cavite mutiny commenced early that year. Due to the implication of Burgos and two other priests in the mutiny, they were executed. Paciano assisted in enrolling José in the Ateneo Municipal for his secondary studies. Paciano helped José choose a course in his tertiary studies. After Burgos died, he went back to Calamba to oversee his family's hacienda.

Due to José's desire to go to Europe, Paciano and his uncle Antonio assisted José in traveling to Europe without informing his parents. He also supported the Propaganda Movement and Katipunan. In 1888, an agrarian crisis arose in Calamba, causing Paciano and his family to be evicted from their house. Paciano was exiled to Mindoro and subsequently to Jolo. After the release of El filibusterismo, a novel that his brother authored, and alleged plans of an uprising by the Katipunan, José was taken to trial and sentenced to death by firing squad. During the trial, Paciano was tortured for three days. Spanish authorities attempted to extract information from him to use against his brother. José was executed on December 30, 1896.

After José died, Paciano joined Katipunan forces under Emilio Aguinaldo. He was appointed general of the revolutionary forces and was elected Secretary of Finance of Central Luzon. He led troops and fought against the Spanish government, playing a key role in the Battle of Calamba. He was also general in the Philippine–American War but was captured in 1900; after he was released and became a farmer. The American colonial government and the local government of Laguna offered positions to him, but he rejected both. On April 13, 1930, Paciano died at his home in Los Baños at the age of 79 and was buried at the Manila North Cemetery.

== Early life and education ==
Paciano Rizal was born to Francisco Engracio Rizal Mercado y Alejandro and Teodora Alonso y Quintos on March 9, 1851, as the second of eleven children in Calamba, Laguna. Out of two properties they leased, Paciano lived in a stone house. The family was not rich, but comfortable and well-to-do. Francisco and Teodora gave their children good education. The society at the time had a feudalistic nature: Spaniards extracted money from the natives as taxes and assigned them to manual labor. The Spaniards and friars were upper-class, favored natives, mestizos, and creoles were middle class, and regular native Filipinos and Indios were low-class.

Paciano was first educated through his mother. His siblings designated him "ñor Paciano"—the prefix derived from the term "señor"—and he was entrusted with responsibilities on the family farm and in watching his younger siblings. Sometime later, he was sent to Biñan, Laguna, to learn Latin under Maestro Justiniano Cruz. Subsequently, he proceeded to Manila, where he enrolled at the San José College taking a course in Philosophy. Austin Craig proclaimed that Paciano regularly failed his examinations due to "outspokenness" in contrast to the "evils of the country [Philippines]." After witnessing grave abuses Spanish friars performed to the Filipinos, he became a member of the La Juventud Liberal—the youth wing of Comite de Reformadores, a group working on secularization.

While in Manila, Paciano befriended Father José Burgos and resided in his home. He regularly served as the "messenger" for negotiations between Burgos and the Spanish government due to the secularization movement Burgos ran. His close relationship with Burgos led to Spaniards preventing him from taking his final examinations at the College. In 1870, he accompanied his younger brother, José, to Biñan, Laguna, in order to assist him in enrolling in the school of Cruz. He introduced José to Cruz.

The 1872 Cavite mutiny commenced early that year. The Gomburza priests, comprising Mariano Gomez, Burgos, and Jacinto Zamora, were implicated in the mutiny, causing them to be hanged to death. Through Paciano, José read barred papers that revealed comparisons by Jaegor, a German traveler of the Philippines, to countries in Europe. That same year, Paciano was tasked to enroll José in the Ateneo de Manila University; José had to take an entrance test on June 10. Although José passed, the academic year had already begun, causing Paciano to solicit the help of Father Burgos' nephew, Xerez Burgos, to convince the Jesuits to let José enter the school. Upon enrolling, Paciano advised José to use his second surname, Rizal, in registering due to Paciano's relation to Father Burgos. When José stayed in Manila, he had to share his room with Paciano and another boy. After the death of Father Burgos, Paciano retired from Manila and went back to Calamba. He was dedicated to farming and in watching their family's "hacienda". Paciano influenced José's tertiary studies as well. While José questioned what courses he would take in university—either literature, law, or medicine—Paciano discouraged José from choosing law school, due to the study of law not suiting him. He suggested José pick a course in the arts, but concluded he pick anything but law.

== Further life and exile ==
Leon Guerrero opined that José's literary triumphs, as well as disappointment in his studies at university, tempted him to attempt studying abroad. Per agreement with Paciano and his uncle Antonio, José left for Europe on May 1, 1882. Paciano woke José up at dawn to travel to Biñan and then to Manila. Paciano called his servants to supply José with a carromata to transport him. Before José left, Paciano provided him with 356 Mexican pesos. José's trip to Europe was left a secret to his parents, who only thought he was traveling to Manila. Paciano provided José with his monthly stipend of 50 Mexican pesos that was oftentimes late, causing José to miss meals. He eventually lowered the amount he gave to José to 35 Mexican pesos. After the parents found out of his trip to Europe, Paciano helped calm them down. He kept José updated on events happening in his homeland and translated José's poems including José's "El Amor Patrio" that Paciano gave to Marcelo H. del Pilar.

In regular letters Paciano sent to José, Paciano reported three deadly cases of cholera on July 24. The next month, Paciano reported that, in Calamba and in every barrio, a procession occurred every night "praying to God to spare the town of the plague." Classes were suspended indefinitely and students from Manila went back to their towns to quarantine. In a full report by Paciano on September 1882, he said:

When [the cholera epidemic] was officially declared in Manila, land and sea communications were interrupted. Ships coming from filthy ports were forbidden to stop here. The steamers that come from Manila go directly to Sta. Cruz [Laguna] to be fumigated and quarantined for 12 hours. Towns[people] are not allowed to mingle with each other or enjoy any consideration, except with the permission of the government.

— Paciano Rizal,

Paciano and José purportedly made a pact for both to work for the country; hence, only one of them would get married. Once José came home from Europe, he insisted on marrying Leonor Rivera, his love interest, which Paciano discouraged. Although the Propaganda Movement was in Europe, Paciano financed the development by giving contributions. He supported the Katipunan by corroborating its ideology and recruiting members in Laguna. Despite Paciano suggesting José not return from Europe, José arrived in the Philippines in August 1887 after staying in Europe for five years. Due to pressure from friars for José to leave the Philippines after the release of his novel, Noli Me Tángere, he left for Hong Kong in February 1888. That same year, an agrarian crisis arose in Calamba; the Mercado family was implicated in it. The family lost the dispute and was promptly ejected from their homes. Subsequently, Paciano was exiled from Calamba to Mindoro along with four other citizens from September 1890 until November 1891. Shortly after his Mindoro exile, he was exiled again in Jolo while taking the place of his brother-in-law Antonio Lopez.

== Execution of José Rizal ==
After El filibusterismo, another of José's novels, was published in 1891, being affiliated with the author of both novels was, according to Chris Antonette Piedad-Pugay of the National Historical Commission of the Philippines, "like carrying a heavy cross." Paciano and other family members were implicated in controversy due to this. After three years of exile in Dapitan, José planned to travel to Barcelona in July 1896. During his travel to Spain, he was called into the captain's cabin, where he was informed that an uprising was planned by the Katipunan and that he was implicated in it. He was taken to a chartered ship directed to the Philippines. Upon reaching Singapore for a fuel stop, a writ was requested on behalf of José but was rejected by the Singaporean government. As José Manila on November 3, he was taken to Fort Santiago, where he was imprisoned. That same month, he was arrested with Manuel Hidalgo—his brother-in-law—for being directors of Katipunan activities.

In an attempt to extract evidence, Paciano was tortured in December. He was seated at a table in police headquarters with a thumbscrew on one hand and a pen in the other. Near him was a confession that would declare his brother guilty; Paciano was urged to sign it. He did not, causing him to be hung up by the elbows until he was numb. He was then cut down. The St. Louis Post-Dispatch reported that he even fainted and that the torture continued until Paciano's mind "began to wander". After three days of torture, Paciano was too sick to sign, causing him to be carted home. He was released "shapeless" and was described by Piedad-Pugay as "good as dead." After trials that same month, José was charged with creating an illegal society and was responsible for ongoing rebellion. He was sentenced to death.

On December 29, as the groups Magdiwang and Magdalo were having their first meeting for unification in Imus, Paciano arrived with Josephine Bracken. Paciano reported his brother's eventual execution. General Emilio Aguinaldo and Supremo Andrés Bonifacio already knew by that time and had made a plan to rescue him. However, Paciano said that José disapproved of such rescues due to opining that the plan was doomed to fail, highlighting the low Katipunan members in Manila. He further added that, if they were to save José, only one life should be risked since "two lives in the service of the nation could never be equal to one." According to Aguinaldo, Paciano refused the plan repeatedly, saying "do not dare save my brother if you want to avoid bloodshed" numerous times. Many arrests of Katipunan members had already happened and José did not want more people to die. A letter for Paciano, who had joined the Katipunan, was included in José's last letters. In the letter, José apologized for leaving him and his family alone and thought of how hard Paciano worked to give José a career. José was executed by shooting on December 30. After Rizal's execution, Paciano gave Bonifacio a copy of Rizal's last poem "Mi Ultimo Adios".

== Revolutionary ==
In January 1897, after his younger brother's execution, Paciano and his sisters went to Imus, Cavite, to offer their services to General Emilio Aguinaldo. Paciano was appointed general of the revolutionary forces and was elected Secretary of Finance in the Departmental Government of Central Luzon. He had several meetings with Apolinario Mabini. When the Spanish forces took Cavite back, the government led by Aguinaldo retreated to Biak-na-Bato. Eventually, Filipino revolutionary leaders left for voluntary exile in Hong Kong. Paciano chose to stay behind. He left Biak-na-Bato to go to Laguna and continued fighting Spanish soldiers. In 1898, Aguinaldo returned to the Philippines to continue the revolution; Paciano was one of the first generals to follow Aguinaldo's command. He led numerous troops and continued fighting against the Spanish forces. In August, Paciano targeted Spaniards in Batangas as the Filipinos captured numerous soldiers and ammunition.

From June 1 to August 19, Paciano also was a leader of 400 Filipinos against 60 Spaniards in the Battle of Calamba, fighting them until the Spaniards surrendered. Paciano was also one of the leaders of a siege in Santa Cruz, Laguna, that 10,000 Filipinos joined, yet were defeated. A trick Paciano used in getting Spaniards to surrender in Calamba was by lighting firecrackers to frighten the Spaniards due to a limited number of guns. Paciano was assigned by Aguinaldo to deliver arms and disband troops in Laguna. Paciano continued engaging in warfare even after the Philippine–American War commenced. He was the head of a commissary providing soldiers with ammunition. Paciano was described by The Oregonian as one of the most intelligent Filipino generals. He was captured by American troops in 1900 and went back to farming after he was released. After the victory of George Dewey, Paciano cleared the Laguna de Bay area of Spanish soldiers.

According to historical accounts by Pedro Paterno, Paciano felt immense hatred against the Spanish due to their position in banishing his family and executing José. During a meeting between Paterno and Paciano discussing plans for a truce, he told Paterno to "dig a deep well" and "fill it with all the bolos and lances you want," then command Paciano to throw himself into it, but do not ask him for peace with the Spanish, concluding that the idea was "impossible" and "absurd". According to other accounts by Fidel Villarroel, he had a civil attitude toward the Dominican friars.

== Retirement and death ==
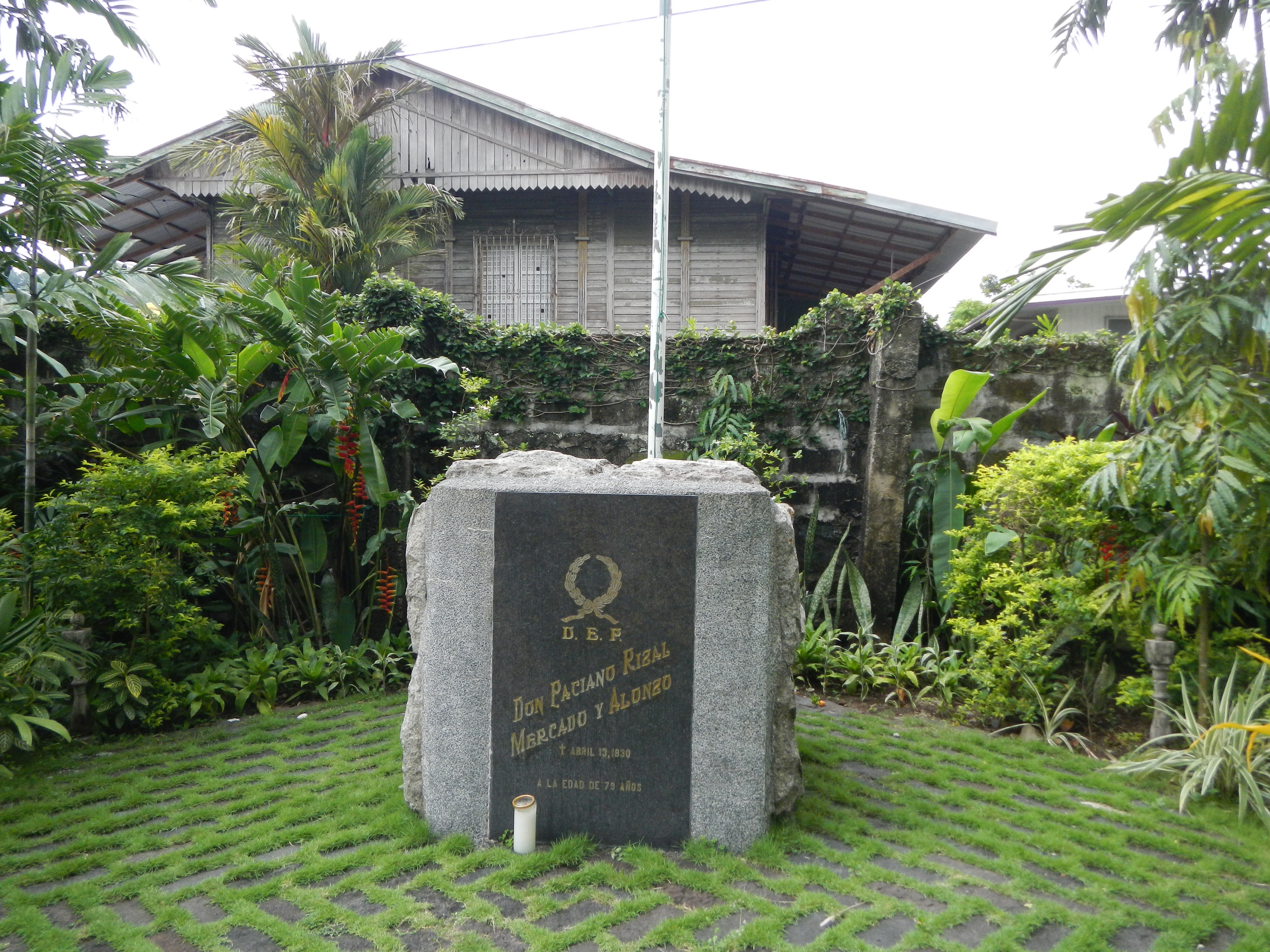
Paciano Rizal's gravesite in Los Baños, Laguna.

Purportedly, American Governor William Howard Taft once offered him a high position in the American colonial government, but Paciano declined the offer. He also rejected working in the public office of Laguna. In 1907, the newly created Philippine Assembly passed a resolution planning to provide a life pension of 200 PHP per month to his mother for parenting José Rizal. Paciano declined the plan, stating that it was his duty to aid and support his mother until her death. His mother also opposed the offer, stating that her family was never "patriots for money," and told the government to utilize the unused funds to lower taxes. On April 13, 1930, Paciano died at his home in Los Baños at the age of 79. He was buried at the Manila North Cemetery.

== In popular culture ==
- Portrayed by Pen Medina and Ping Medina in José Rizal (1998)
- Portrayed by Marco Alcaraz in Ilustrado (2014)
- Portrayed by Elijah Canlas in GomBurZa (2023)

== Personal life ==
Even though José was photographed numerous times, only two pictures are known of Paciano: one of him in a family reunion and another of his corpse. He did not want to be photographed due being a wanted man in the past, and an absence of photos would give greater freedom to him. Paciano had courted many women but did not marry. However, he had a daughter. According to historical accounts from Paciano's relatives, José, and Epifanio de los Santos, Paciano was much taller and more serious than José and had rosy cheeks. Paciano was thrifty and a quiet man; he never told his relatives stories about José and his tenure as a revolutionary. Although José was seen as a reformist, Paciano was seen as more radical. He was a mentor of José and influenced him to be patriotic.

== Legacy ==
Paciano's life was often overshadowed by the life of his brother, José and was only mostly known as the brother of the national hero. He was the basis of a film named Heneral Rizal that portrays Paciano angry from start to finish while questioning the heroism of his own brother. The film is 30 minutes long and was one of the entries in the 2020 Cinemalaya. In Los Baños, a shrine dedicated to Paciano was installed on April 13, 1983; the shrine is classified as a level 1 national historical landmark. A camp in Santa Cruz, Camp Heneral Paciano Rizal, was named to honor Paciano on June 17, 2011. A personage honoring Paciano was installed in the camp on July 28, 2021. The installation of the personage was held by Laguna Governor Ramil Hernandez and was also celebrated in honor of the 450th founding anniversary of the province. In Calamba, a barangay and an elementary school was named after Paciano. An executive issuance made by Gloria Macapagal Arroyo declared March 9, 2009, as "General Paciano Rizal Day" in Laguna. Celebrations were also made by the Laguna Provincial Police Office honoring Paciano.
