= José Rizal =

Filipino nationalist, writer, and polymath (1861–1896)

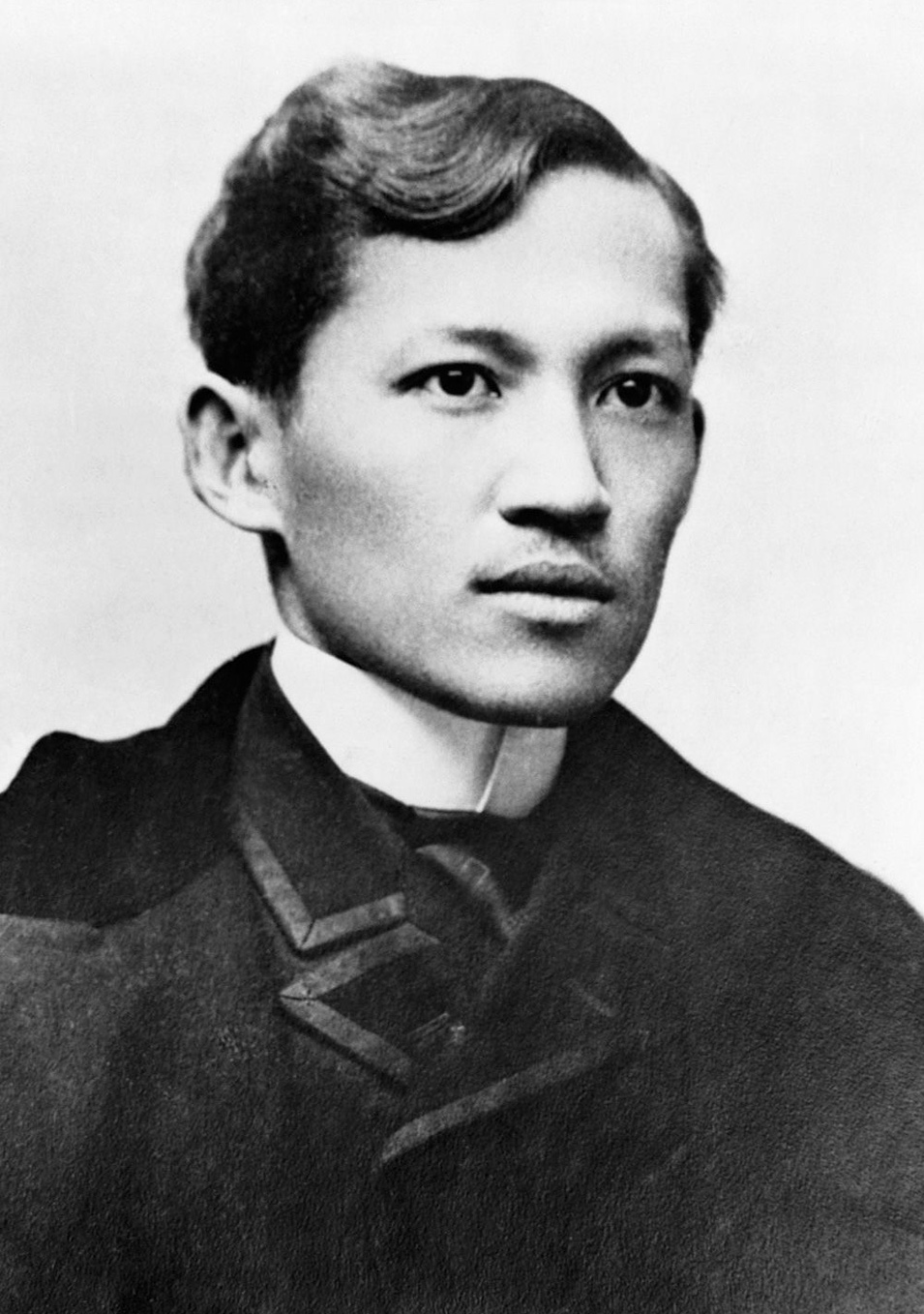
- Rizal c. 1890s
- Born: José Protasio Rizal Mercado y Alonso Realonda; June 19, 1861; Calamba, La Laguna, Captaincy General of the Philippines, Spanish Empire
- Died: December 30, 1896 (aged 35); Bagumbayan, Manila, Captaincy General of the Philippines, Spanish Empire
- Cause of death: Execution by firing squad
- Resting place: Original internment: Paco Park; Reinterred: Rizal Monument, Manila
- Monuments: Daet, Camarines Norte; Manila; Calamba, Laguna; Madrid, Spain
- Other names: Pepe, Tío Pepe
- Education: Ateneo Municipal de Manila (AB); University of Santo Tomas; Universidad Central de Madrid (MD)
- Organizations: La Solidaridad; La Liga Filipina
- Notable work: Noli Me Tángere (1887); El filibusterismo (1891)
- Movement: Propaganda Movement
- Spouse: Josephine Bracken (m. 1896)
- Parents: Francisco Rizal Mercado (father); Teodora Alonso Realonda (mother)
- Relatives: Saturnina Hidalgo (sister); Paciano Rizal (brother); Trinidad Rizal (sister); Mónico R. Mercado (second cousin)

José Protasio Rizal Mercado y Alonso Realonda (Spanish: [xoˈse riˈsal, -ˈθal], Tagalog: [hoˈse ɾiˈsal]; June 19, 1861 – December 30, 1896) was a Filipino nationalist, writer, and polymath active at the end of the Spanish colonial period of the Philippines. He is popularly considered to be a national hero of the Philippines. An ophthalmologist by profession, Rizal became a writer and a key member of the Filipino Propaganda Movement in the 1880s, which advocated political reforms for the colony under Spain.

By the early 1890s, amidst the Calamba land dispute, Rizal grew more separatist in his stance, conflicting with several colleagues in the Propaganda Movement. On July 6, 1892, a few days after establishing the secret society La Liga Filipina within Manila, Rizal was arrested by Spanish authorities for alleged possession of a seditious document, being banished to Dapitan in the island of Mindanao. During his exile, Rizal met Josephine Bracken, an Irish woman who later became his common-law wife.

After four years in exile, Rizal left Dapitan for Cuba in August 1896 with the permission of Governor General Ramón Blanco, intending to serve as a doctor in the Spanish territory. At a stopover in Barcelona, he was arrested on October 6, 1896 after the Philippine Revolution broke out; the revolution was inspired by his writings. In December 1896, he was executed by the Spanish colonial government for the crime of rebellion. Though he was not actively involved in its planning or conduct, he ultimately approved of its goals, which eventually resulted in Philippine independence.

Rizal is widely considered one of the greatest and most influential figures in the Philippines, and has been recommended to be so honored by an officially empaneled National Heroes Committee. However, no law, executive order or proclamation has been enacted or issued officially proclaiming any Filipino historical figure as a national hero. He wrote the novels Noli Me Tángere (1887) and El filibusterismo (1891), which together are taken as a national epic, in addition to numerous poems and essays.

== Early life and education ==
Rizal's parents

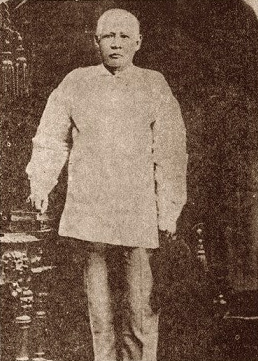
Francisco Rizal Mercado (1818–1898)

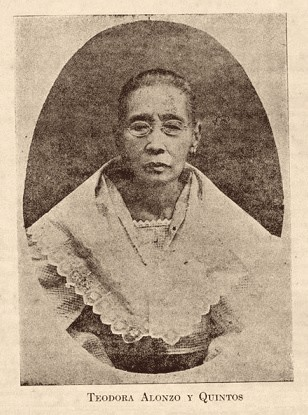
Teodora Alonso Realonda (1827–1911)

The Mercado family adopted Rizal (Note: Originally Risal in the catalogue from the Spanish ricial meaning a green field ready to harvest) as a secondary surname following a decree by Governor-General Narciso Clavería y Zaldúa that mandated that Filipinos adopt Spanish surnames from a list known as the Catálogo alfabético de apellidos in 1849. The family continued to use their surname Mercado. The family's patrilineal lineage traced back to Lam-co, a Chinese merchant from Fujian who immigrated to the Philippines in 1697 and settled in Calamba.

On his mother's side, Rizal's lineage included the Florentina family, Chinese mestizos who originated in Baliuag, Bulacan, and the Ochoa family, a Spanish line from Cavite. This maternal heritage also included Japanese ancestry through his great-great-grandfather, Eugenio Ursua, as well as Rizal's native Tagalog roots. The family resided in a bahay na bato, an architectural style then associated with the Filipino elite that was situated near the town plaza, a proximity that historian John Ray Ramos states indicated the family's social and political influence.

José Mercado was born on June 19, 1861, in Calamba, Laguna. The seventh child of Francisco Rizal Mercado and Teodora Alonso Realonda y Quintos, he was baptized into the Roman Catholic Church on June 22 at the town's parish by Father Rufino Collantes. His parents were leaseholders of a hacienda and a rice farm owned by the Dominican Order. Teodora taught him the alphabet at age three, and by five he could read and write. She instructed him in prayer and poetry, and required him to help with household chores.

His favorite sister was Concepcion, who died in 1865 at the age of three. Historian Austin Craig identified this event as Rizal's first experience of sorrow and his first realization that life was "a constant struggle." Rizal owned a black dog named Usman and a pony named Alipato, which was a gift from his father for his seventh birthday. He alternated between walking and riding, a habit he continued in his later travels. Despite this loss, Rizal's childhood was by most accounts a happy one, marked by the equal treatment his parents extended to all their children.

According to historian Austin Craig, the Mercado household was exposed to a world beyond Calamba that few provincial families encountered. The Mercado residence served as a frequent stopping point for civil, military, and church authorities traveling to nearby health resorts, where Rizal's mother, Teodora, attended to the guests. At age seven, Rizal went on his first pilgrimage to Antipolo, marking his first "real journey" according to Craig. His family visited the mountain shrine of Our Lady of Peace and Good Voyage, where Rizal obtained a print of the Virgin Mary that he kept in his wooden chest as a souvenir. Rizal developed an early curiosity, reading from the family's extensive library and learning folk stories from his nanny Aquilina.

Teodora's literary background familiarized her children with major Spanish writers, whose works she retold in ways suited to their age. She ensured the Bible featured prominently in their home. Her Vulgate was reflected in Rizal's later works. Another influence on Rizal was his association with the parish priest of Calamba, Father Leoncio Lopez, whom the writer John Foreman described as remarkable for his broad intelligence and judgment. Rizal practiced sleight-of-hand tricks that led locals to believe he had supernatural powers, a belief that persisted even after his death. He also wrote a Tagalog drama that impressed a visiting municipal captain of Paete, earning him two pesos, convincing his family to cultivate his talent. His brother Paciano, who had lived with Father José Burgos, served as an early intellectual resource for the curious Rizal.

=== Education ===
==== Elementary ====
Rizal first studied under Justiniano Aquino Cruz in Biñan due to the death of his private tutor. He did not want to go away from Calamba, with Raul Fernandez stating that a day staying back at his hometown "seemed to him as a day spent in heaven." His school was at the house of his teacher, a nipa house close to his aunt's house. His teacher was knowledgeable, yet strict. Rizal attempted to improve his knowledge in Latin and Spanish. Rizal was not fond of living in Biñan, stating that it was "large and rich, but ugly and dismal." Memorization was much used in teaching and lessons were interspersed with punishments. According to Rafael Palma, he felt humiliated and humbled. Due to one of his classmates mocking him for speaking little Spanish, Rizal was challenged to a fight, which he later won. This gave him the reputation of being a small yet strong boy.

Rizal would wake up early and attend the 4:00 a.m. mass. If there was no mass, he would study instead. After, he would eat breakfast and go to class. He left school at 10:00 a.m. for lunch. He would once again, study. He would return to school at 2:00 p.m. and leave three hours later, then play for a short moment with his friends. He would return home to eat dinner and play again. In 1870, upon receiving a letter from his family, Rizal left Biñan using a steamboat named Talim. After spending Christmas with his family, it was decided that he would not return to Biñan, but enroll in secondary school in Manila.

==== Secondary ====
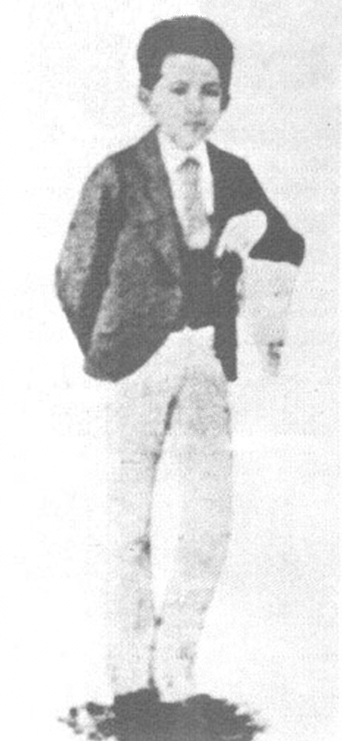
Rizal, 11 years old, a student at the Ateneo Municipal de Manila

Rizal's family was prominent, being connected with the local friars, the Alcalde of Laguna. Nobody in Calamba owned land; the owners were the Dominican friars. When the residents were having financial problems, the friars raised the rent—a decision Francisco Mercado opposed. On February 17, 1872, the Gomburza priests were executed. Due to the family opposing the government, Rizal's brother, Paciano, was connected to the execution. As Rizal was waiting for July, the month he would study in Manila, Jose Alberto, the cousin of Teodora, alleged that Teodora attempted to poison him. Due to Alberto being one of the richest in Biñan, the alcalde placed Teodora in prison. She had to walk 30 kilometres (19 miles) to the nearest prison barefoot. (Note: Another source states that Teodora had to walk 30 km (19 mi) to prison.) This caused Rizal to lose trust in men. After the case continued for two and a half years, Teodora was finally released.

Rizal enrolled at the Ateneo Municipal de Manila after his brother sought help from one of his friends. The school originally rejected him since the academic term already started. Upon enrolling at the school, he dropped the last three names that made up his full name, on the advice of his brother and the Mercado family, rendering his name as "José Protasio Rizal". Of this, he later wrote: "My family never paid much attention [to our second surname Rizal], but now I had to use it, thus giving me the appearance of an illegitimate child!"

Before he joined Ateneo, his knowledge of Spanish was little. His understanding of the language improved tremendously during the academic term, giving him the title of class "emperor". His love for books also grew. During the first year in Ateneo, specifically the first semester, he won first prize in a religious picture contest. He spent his lunch break taking private lessons in Spanish at the Santa Isabel College. In the second semester, he did not try hard to retain his scholarship—often resenting some remarks of his professor—yet gained an "excellent" grade.

In his second year in Ateneo, he was again the class "emperor" and excelled in all of his subjects, causing him to be rewarded with a gold medal. In March 1874, he went back to Calamba for his summer vacation. In his third year in Ateneo, he became an "interne" while topping all of his classes and gaining five gold medals. He returned to Calamba for his summer vacation. Rizal returned to Manila in June 1876 for his last year in Ateneo and was considered as the most brilliant in his school. Rizal graduated on March 23, 1877, and gained a high school certificate as a Bachelor in Arts. He gained numerous prizes and awards.

==== Tertiary ====
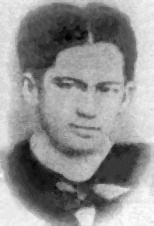
Rizal as a student at the University of Santo Tomas

Rizal went to the University of Santo Tomas for tertiary studies. In April 1877, he was officially enrolled in the school, taking a course in Philosophy and Letters. He was originally uncertain on which course he would take, but picked the course due to his father wanting him to. In the university, he joined numerous literary contests. Simultaneously, he took a vocational course in land surveying in Ateneo, excelling in all subjects.

He had numerous extracurricular activities in Ateneo, being an officer of the Marian Congregation, and part of the Society of Natural Sciences. When Rizal was 17, he passed the final examination, but the title was issued to him on November 25, 1881, due to him being underage. Upon learning that his mother was going blind, he decided to switch to medicine at the medical school of Santo Tomas during his second year in the university. He stayed in Santo Tomas for an additional four years.

Rizal wrote numerous literary works during his stay in the University of Santo Tomas and Ateneo. A La Juventud Filipina (transl. To the Filipino Youth), Rizal's submission and the winning poem of a contest held by the Artistic-Literary Lyceum of Manila in 1879, encouraged the youth to work hard and to create a bright future. El Consejo de Dioses (transl. The Council of the Gods), the winning entry of a contest held by the Lyceum of Manila in 1880, is a play located in Mount Olympus where Greek gods contend on the best moral writer. Junto Al Pasig (transl. By the Pasig River), a zarzuela performed in Ateneo, discusses a boy being tempted by Satan to leave the Catholic faith. The boy refused to give up his faith.

=== Travel to Europe ===
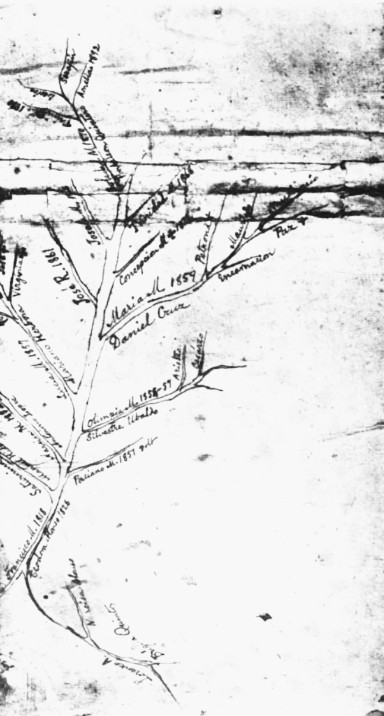
A family tree made by Rizal while in exile at Dapitan, c. 1890s

In May 1882, without his parents' knowledge and consent, but secretly supported by his brother Paciano and his uncle Antonio, he traveled alone to Spain to study. Rizal left on May 1: Paciano woke him up in dawn to travel to Biñan, then to Manila. He bid goodbye to his parents, who assumed he was traveling to Manila and not abroad, then left using a carromata—a two-wheeled passenger vehicle drawn by a single pony. After switching carromatas twice, Rizal arrived in Manila. On May 2, he visited his friends, then was escorted to the Pasig River the next day.

Rizal boarded the steamship Salvadora which was directed to Singapore. Upon arriving in Singapore, he embarked on the French ship Djemnah, headed to Europe. The ship made stopovers at Colombo, Sri Lanka and traversed the Suez Canal. On June 12, the ship docked in Marseille. Rizal then boarded a train to Spain, where he arrived on June 16.

In November 1882, he enrolled at the Universidad Central de Madrid and joined two courses: Medicine and Philosophy and Letters. He took private lessons in French, German, and English while practicing painting, sculpting, fencing, and shooting. While in Spain, Rizal joined the Circulo Hispano-Filipino—a reform organization composed of Filipinos and Spaniards—and created the poem Me Piden Versos upon their request. Rizal lived on a tight budget, purchasing books whenever he saved some money. As Rizal was instructed not to work to focus on his studies, he often relied on the allowance bestowed upon him by Paciano. The allowance was not enough, causing Rizal to sometimes become hungry. During this time, Rizal could not take a bath as bathing had a fee.

In summer vacation, Rizal went to Paris, France and stayed from June 17 to August 20, 1883. He visited numerous landmarks, including the Place de la Concorde and the Bois de Boulogne, and spent hours in museums and botanical gardens. On June 24, 1884, Rizal attended a celebratory party for Juan Luna and Félix Resurrección Hidalgo after they won medals in the Exposición Nacional de Bellas Artes (transl. National Exposition of Fine Arts) in Madrid. At the party, he offered a toast to the two artists, stating that greatness was not bounded by one's skin color or place of birth. He further stated that "anybody can be a genius". Rizal's speech was publicized by the Los Dos Mundos magazine, a popular one. Through this, Rizal became famous as Spaniards supporting the independence of Filipinos validated his speech.

At Heidelberg, the 25-year-old Rizal completed his eye specialization in 1887 under the professor Otto Becker. There he used the newly invented ophthalmoscope, invented by Hermann von Helmholtz, to later operate on his mother's eye. From Heidelberg, Rizal wrote his parents: "I spend half of the day in the study of German and the other half, in the diseases of the eye. Twice a week, I go to the bierbraueriei, or beerhall, to speak German with my student friends." He lived in a Karlstraße boarding house, then moved to Ludwigsplatz. There, he met Reverend Karl Ullmer and stayed with them in Wilhelmsfeld. There he wrote the last few chapters of Noli Me Tángere, his first novel, published in Spanish later that year.

Rizal was skilled in both science and the arts. He painted, sketched, and made sculptures and woodcarving. He was a prolific poet, essayist, and novelist whose most famous works were his two novels, Noli Me Tángere (1887) and its sequel, El filibusterismo (1891). (Note: His novel Noli was one of the first novels in Asia written outside Japan and China and was one of the first novels of anti-colonial rebellion. Read Benedict Anderson's commentary: .) These social commentaries during the Spanish colonial period of the country formed the nucleus of literature that inspired peaceful reformists and armed revolutionaries alike.

Rizal was also a polyglot, conversant in twenty-two languages. (Note: He was conversant in Spanish, French, Latin, Greek, German, Portuguese, Italian, English, Dutch, and Japanese. Rizal also made translations from Arabic, Swedish, Russian, Chinese, Greek, Hebrew, and Sanskrit. He translated the poetry of Schiller into his native Tagalog. In addition he had at least some knowledge of Malay, Chavacano, Cebuano, Ilocano, and Subanun.) (Note: In his essay, "Reflections of a Filipino", (La Solidaridad, c. 1888), he wrote: "Man is multiplied by the number of languages he possesses and speaks.")

Rizal's numerous skills and abilities was described by his German friend, Adolf Bernhard Meyer, as "stupendous." (Note: Adolf Bernard Meyer (1840–1911) was a German ornithologist and anthropologist, and author of the book Philippinen-typen (Dresden, 1888)) Documented studies show Rizal to be a polymath with the ability to master various skills and subjects. He was an ophthalmologist, sculptor, painter, educator, farmer, historian, playwright and journalist. Besides poetry and creative writing, he dabbled, with varying degrees of expertise, in architecture, cartography, economics, ethnology, anthropology, sociology, dramatics, martial arts, fencing and pistol shooting. Skilled in social settings, he became a Freemason, joining Acacia Lodge No. 9 during his time in Spain; he became a Master Mason in 1884. José, as "Rizal", soon distinguished himself in poetry writing contests, impressing his professors with his facility with Castilian and other foreign languages, and later, in writing essays that were critical of the Spanish historical accounts of the pre-colonial Philippine societies.

== Personal life, relationships, and ventures ==
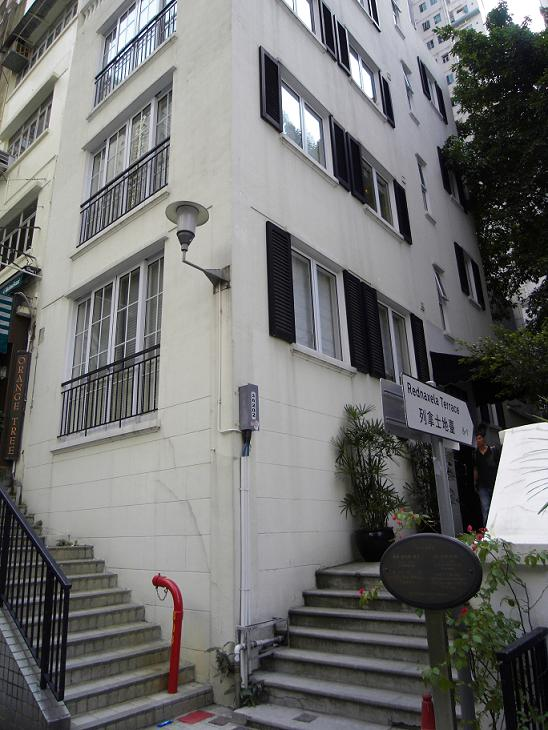
Rednaxela Terrace, where Rizal lived during his self-imposed exile in Hong Kong (photo taken in 2011)

José Rizal's life is one of the most documented of 19th-century Filipinos due to the vast and extensive records written by and about him. Almost everything in his short life is recorded somewhere. He was a regular diarist and prolific letter writer, and much of this material has survived. His biographers have faced challenges in translating his writings because of Rizal's habit of switching from one language to another.

Biographers drew largely from his travel diaries with his comments by a young Asian encountering the West for the first time (other than in Spanish manifestations in the Philippines). These diaries included Rizal's later trips, home and back again to Europe through Japan and the United States, and, finally, through his self-imposed exile in Hong Kong.

Shortly after he graduated from the Ateneo Municipal de Manila (now Ateneo de Manila University), Rizal (who was then 16 years old) and a friend, Mariano Katigbak, visited Rizal's maternal grandmother in Tondo, Manila. Mariano brought along his sister, Segunda Katigbak, a 14-year-old Batangueña from Lipa, Batangas.

It was the first time Rizal had met her, whom he described as

"rather short, with eyes that were eloquent and ardent at times and languid at others, rosy-cheeked, with an enchanting and provocative smile that revealed very beautiful teeth, and the air of a sylph; her entire self diffused a mysterious charm."

His grandmother's guests were mostly college students and they knew that Rizal had skills in painting. They suggested that Rizal should make a portrait of Segunda. He complied reluctantly and made a pencil sketch of her. Rizal referred to her as his first love in his memoir Memorias de un Estudiante de Manila, but Katigbak was already engaged to Manuel Luz.

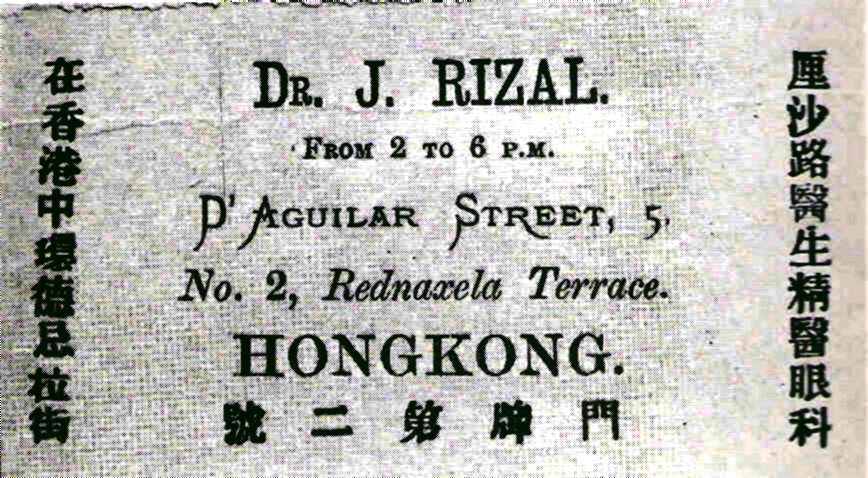
Business card showing José Rizal is an ophthalmologist in Hong Kong

From December 1891 to June 1892, Rizal lived with his family in Number 2 of Rednaxela Terrace, Mid-levels, Hong Kong Island. Rizal used 5 D'Aguilar Street, Central district, Hong Kong Island, as his ophthalmology clinic from 2 pm to 6 pm. In this period of his life, he wrote about nine women who have been identified: Gertrude Beckett of Chalcot Crescent, Primrose Hill, Camden, London; wealthy and high-minded Nelly Boustead of an English-Iberian merchant family; Seiko Usui (affectionately called O-Sei-san), last descendant of a noble Japanese family; his earlier friendship with Segunda Katigbak; Leonor Valenzuela, and an eight-year romantic relationship with Leonor Rivera, a distant cousin (she is thought to have inspired his character of María Clara in Noli Me Tángere).

=== Affair ===
In one account detailing Rizal's 1887 visit to Vienna, Maximo Viola wrote that Rizal had succumbed to a 'lady of the camellias'. Viola, a friend of Rizal's and an early financier of Noli Me Tángere, was alluding to Alexandre Dumas's 1848 novel, The Lady of the Camellias, about a man who fell in love with a courtesan. While noting Rizal's affair, Viola provided no details about its duration or nature. (Note: Ocampo rescued Rizal's third novel Makamisa from oblivion.)

=== Association with Leonor Rivera ===
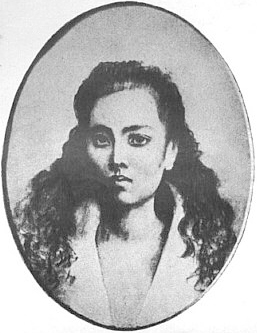
A crayon portrait of Leonor Rivera by José Rizal

Leonor Rivera is thought to have inspired the character of María Clara in Noli Me Tángere and El Filibusterismo. Rivera and Rizal first met in Manila when Rivera was 14 years old and Rizal was 16. When Rizal left for Europe on May 3, 1882, Rivera was 16 years old. Their correspondence began after Rizal left a poem for her.

Their correspondence helped Rizal stay focused on his studies in Europe. They employed codes in their letters because Rivera's mother did not favor Rizal. In a letter from Mariano Katigbak dated June 27, 1884, she referred to Rivera as Rizal's "betrothed". Katigbak described Rivera as having been greatly affected by Rizal's departure, and frequently sick because of insomnia.

Before Rizal returned to the Philippines on August 5, 1887, Rivera and her family had moved back to Dagupan, Pangasinan. Rizal's father forbade the young man to see Rivera in order to avoid putting her family in danger. Rizal was already labeled by the criollo elite as a filibustero or subversive because of his novel Noli Me Tángere. Rizal wanted to marry Rivera while he was still in the Philippines because she had been so faithful to him. Rizal asked permission from his father one more time before his second departure from the Philippines, but he never met her again.

In 1888, Rizal stopped receiving letters from Rivera for a year, although he continued to write to her. Rivera's mother favored an Englishman named Henry Kipping, a railway engineer who fell in love with Rivera. The news of Leonor Rivera's marriage to Kipping devastated Rizal.

His European friends kept almost everything he gave them, including doodlings on pieces of paper. He had visited Spanish liberal, Pedro Ortiga y Pérez, and impressed the man's daughter, Consuelo, who wrote about Rizal. In her diary, she said Rizal had regaled them with his wit, social graces, and sleight-of-hand tricks. In London, during his research on Antonio de Morga's writings, he became a regular guest in the home of Reinhold Rost of the British Museum, who referred to him as "a gem of a man." (Note: Reinhold Rost was the head of the India Office at the British Museum and a renowned 19th-century philologist.) The family of Karl Ullmer, pastor of Wilhelmsfeld, and the Blumentritts in Germany saved even napkins that Rizal had made sketches and notes on. They were ultimately bequeathed to the Rizal family to form a treasure trove of memorabilia.

=== Relationship with Josephine Bracken ===
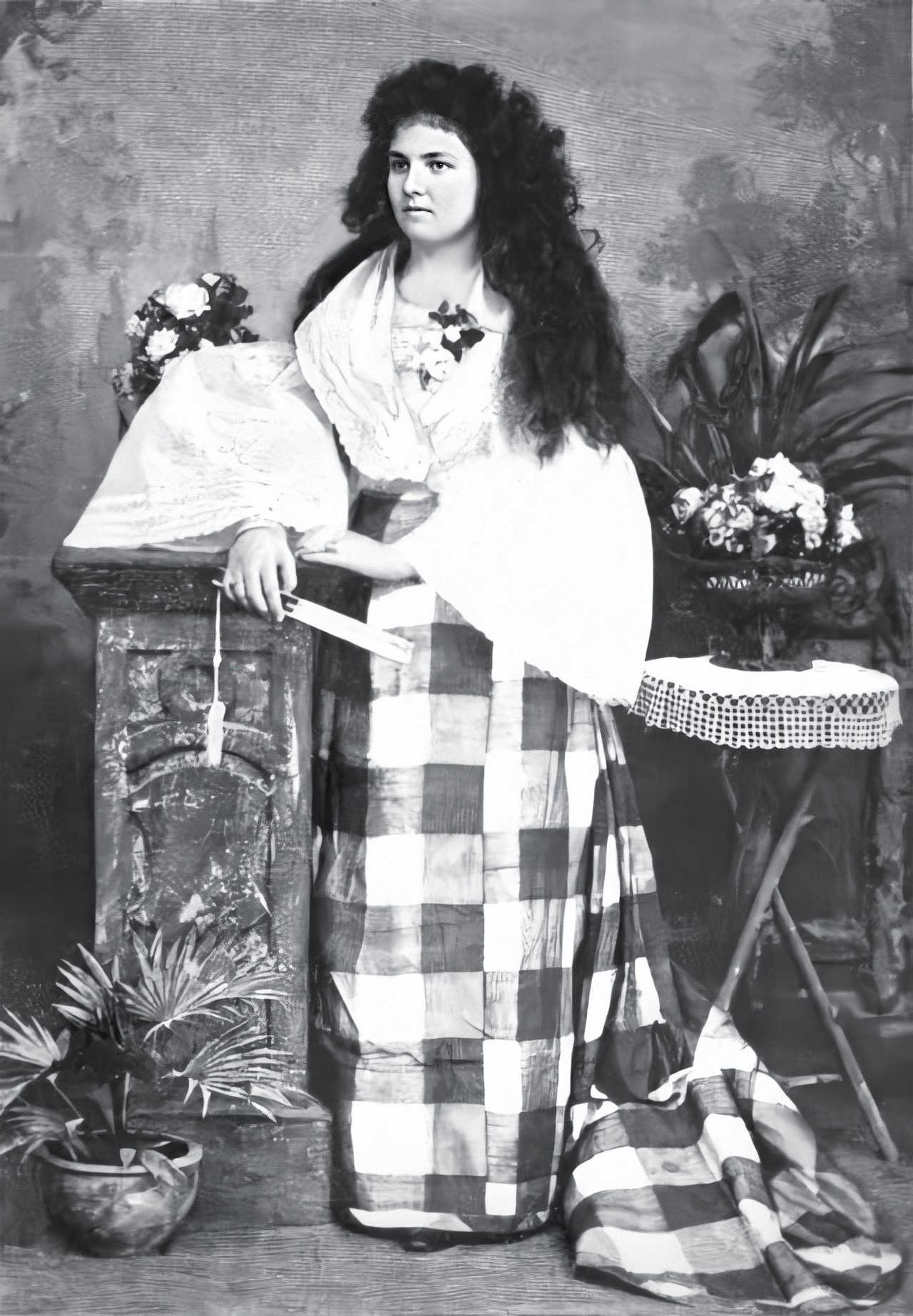
Josephine Bracken was Rizal's common-law wife whom he reportedly married shortly before his execution.

In February 1895, Rizal, 33, met Josephine Bracken, an Irish woman from Hong Kong. She had accompanied her blind adoptive father, George Taufer, to have his eyes checked by Rizal. After frequent visits, Rizal and Bracken fell in love. They applied to marry but, because of Rizal's reputation from his writings and political stance, the local priest Father Obach would hold the ceremony only if Rizal could get permission from the Bishop of Cebu. As Rizal refused to return to practicing Catholicism, the bishop refused permission for an ecclesiastical marriage.

After accompanying her father to Manila on her return to Hong Kong, and before heading back to Dapitan to live with Rizal, Josephine introduced herself to members of Rizal's family in Manila. His mother suggested a civil marriage, which she believed to be a lesser sacrament but less sinful to Rizal's conscience than making any sort of political retraction in order to gain permission from the bishop. Rizal and Josephine lived as husband and wife in a common-law marriage in Talisay in Dapitan. The couple had a son, but he lived only a few hours. Rizal named him after his father Francisco.

== In Brussels and Spain (1890–1892) ==
In 1890, Rizal, 29, left Paris for Brussels as he was preparing for the publication of his annotations of Antonio de Morga's Sucesos de las Islas Filipinas (1609). He lived in the boarding house of the sisters, Catherina and Suzanna Jacoby, who had a niece Suzanna ("Thil"), age 16. Historian Gregorio F. Zaide says that Rizal had "his romance with Suzanne Jacoby, 45, the petite niece of his landladies." Belgian Jean Paul Verstraeten, however, believed that Rizal had a romance with the 17-year-old niece, Suzanna Thil, as his other liaisons were all with young women. He found records clarifying their names and ages.

Rizal's Brussels stay was short-lived; he moved to Madrid, giving the young Suzanna a box of chocolates. She wrote to him in French: "After your departure, I did not take the chocolate. The box is still intact as on the day of your parting. Don't delay too long writing us because I wear out the soles of my shoes for running to the mailbox to see if there is a letter from you. There will never be any home in which you are so loved as in that in Brussels, so, you little bad boy, hurry up and come back…" In 2007, Jean Paul Verstraeten, after convincing the home owner in Brussels arranged for an historical marker honoring Rizal to be placed at the house (see I-Witness Little Bad Boy: Binatang Rizal sa Europe).

He published Dimanche des Rameaux (Palm Sunday), a socio-political essay, in Berlin on November 30, 1886. He discussed the significance of Palm Sunday in socio-political terms:

"This entry [of Jesus into Jerusalem] decided the fate of the jealous priests, the Pharisees, of all those who believed themselves the only ones who had the right to speak in the name of God, of those who would not admit the truths said by others because they have not been said by them. That triumph, those hosannas, all those flowers, those olive branches, were not for Jesus alone; they were the songs of the victory of the new law, they were the canticles celebrating the dignification of man, the liberty of man, the first mortal blow directed against despotism and slavery".

Shortly after its publication, Rizal was summoned by the German police, who suspected him of being a French spy.

The content of Rizal's writings changed considerably in his two most famous novels, Noli Me Tángere, published in Berlin in 1887, and El Filibusterismo, published in Ghent in 1891. For the latter, he used funds borrowed from his friends. These writings angered both the Spanish colonial elite and many educated Filipinos due to their symbolism. They are critical of Spanish friars and the power of the Church. Rizal's friend Ferdinand Blumentritt, a professor and historian born in Austria-Hungary, wrote that the novel's characters were drawn from life and that every episode could be repeated on any day in the Philippines. By 1891, his second surname had become so well known that, as he writes to another friend, "All my family now carry the name Rizal instead of Mercado because the name Rizal means persecution! Good! I too want to join them and be worthy of this family name..."

Blumentritt was a staunch defender of the Catholic faith. This did not dissuade him from writing the preface of El filibusterismo, after he had translated Noli Me Tángere into German. As Blumentritt had warned, these books resulted in Rizal's being prosecuted as the inciter of revolution. He was eventually tried by the military, convicted, and executed. His books were thought to contribute to the Philippine Revolution of 1896, but other forces had also been building for it.

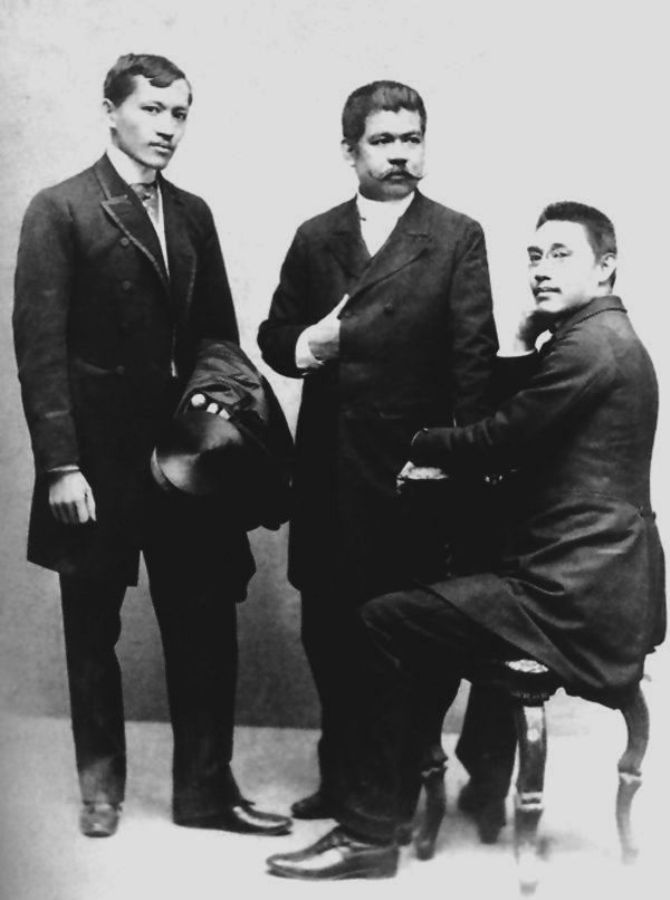
Leaders of the reform movement in Spain. Left to right: Rizal, del Pilar, and Ponce (c. 1890).

As leader of the reform movement of Filipino students in Spain, Rizal contributed essays, allegories, poems, and editorials to the Spanish newspaper La Solidaridad in Barcelona (in this case Rizal used pen names, "Dimasalang", "Laong Laan" and "May Pagasa"). The core of his writings centers on liberal and progressive ideas of individual rights and freedom; specifically, rights for the Filipino people. He shared the same sentiments with members of the movement: Rizal wrote that the people of the Philippines were battling "a double-faced Goliath"—corrupt friars and bad government. His commentaries reiterate the following agenda: (Note: In his letter "Manifesto to Certain Filipinos" (Manila, 1896), he states: Reforms, if they are to bear fruit, must come from above; for reforms that come from below are upheavals both violent and transitory.(Epistolario Rizalino, op cit))

- That the Philippines be made a province of Spain (The Philippines was a province of New Spain – now Mexico, administered from Mexico City from 1565 to 1821. From 1821 to 1898, it was administered directly from Spain.)
- Representation in the Cortes
- Filipino priests instead of Spanish friars – Augustinians, Dominicans, and Franciscans – in parishes and remote sitios
- Freedom of assembly and speech
- Equal rights before the law (for both Filipino and Spanish plaintiffs)

The colonial authorities in the Philippines did not favor these reforms. Such Spanish intellectuals as Morayta, Unamuno, Pi y Margall, and others did endorse them.

In 1890, a rivalry developed between Rizal and Marcelo H. del Pilar for the leadership of La Solidaridad and the reform movement in Europe. The majority of the expatriates supported the leadership of del Pilar.

Wenceslao Retana, a political commentator in Spain, had slighted Rizal by writing an insulting article in La Epoca, a newspaper in Madrid. He implied that Rizal's family and friends had been evicted from their lands in Calamba for not having paid their due rents. The incident (when Rizal was ten) stemmed from an accusation that Rizal's mother, Teodora, tried to poison the wife of a cousin, but she said she was trying to help. With the approval of the Church prelates, and without a hearing, she was ordered to prison in Santa Cruz in 1871. She was forced to walk the 10 miles (16 km) from Calamba. She was released after two-and-a-half years of appeals to the highest court. In 1887, Rizal wrote a petition on behalf of the tenants of Calamba, and later that year led them to speak out against the friars' attempts to raise rent. They initiated litigation that resulted in the Dominicans' evicting them and the Rizal family from their homes. General Valeriano Weyler had the tenant buildings on the farm torn down.

Upon reading the article, Rizal sent a representative to challenge Retana to a duel. Retana published a public apology and later became one of Rizal's biggest admirers. He wrote the most important biography of Rizal, Vida y Escritos del José Rizal. (Note: According to Laubach, Retana more than any other supporter 'saved Rizal for posterity'. (Laubach, op.cit., p. 383))

== Return to the Philippines (1892–1896) ==
=== Exile in Dapitan ===
Bust of Padre Guerrico in clay, by Rizal

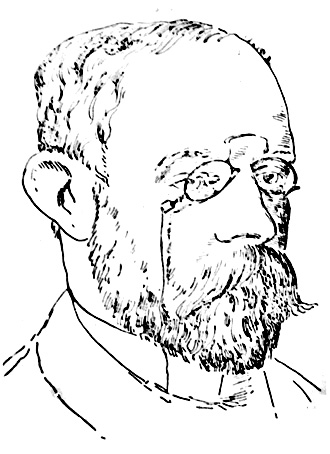
Rizal's pencil sketch of Blumentritt

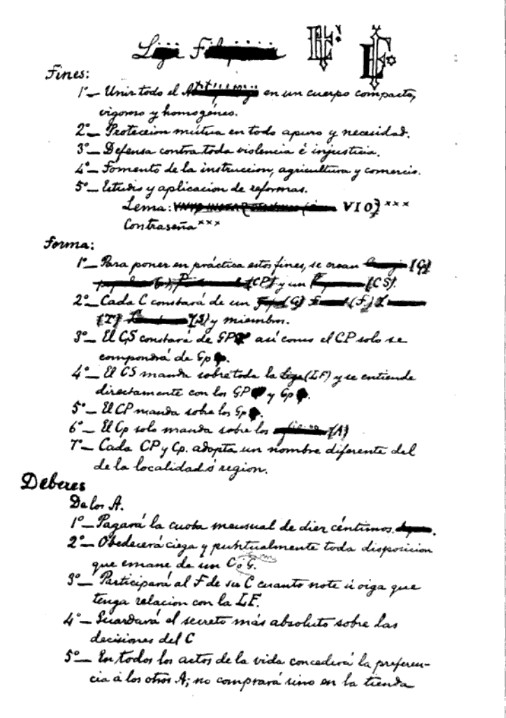
Regulations of the "La Liga Filipina" handwritten by Jose Rizal, c. 1890s

Upon his return to Manila in 1892, he formed a civic movement called La Liga Filipina. The league advocated these moderate social reforms through legal means, but was disbanded by the governor. At that time, he had already been declared an enemy of the state by the Spanish authorities because of the publication of his novel.

Rizal was implicated in the activities of the nascent rebellion and in July 1892, was deported to Dapitan in the province of Zamboanga, a peninsula of Mindanao. There he built a school, a hospital and a water supply system, and taught and engaged in farming and horticulture.

The boys' school, which taught in Spanish, and included English as a foreign language (considered a prescient if unusual option then) was conceived by Rizal and antedated Gordonstoun with its aims of inculcating resourcefulness and self-sufficiency in young men. They would later enjoy successful lives as farmers and honest government officials. One, a Muslim, became a datu, and another, José Aseniero, who was with Rizal throughout the life of the school, became Governor of Zamboanga.

In Dapitan, the Jesuits mounted a great effort to secure his return to the fold led by Fray Francisco de Paula Sánchez, his former professor, who failed in his mission. The task was resumed by Fray Pastells, a prominent member of the Order. In a letter to Pastells, Rizal sails close to the deism familiar to us today.

We are entirely in accord in admitting the existence of God. How can I doubt His when I am convinced of mine. Who so recognizes the effect recognizes the cause. To doubt God is to doubt one's own conscience, and in consequence, it would be to doubt everything; and then what is life for? Now then, my faith in God, if the result of a ratiocination may be called faith, is blind, blind in the sense of knowing nothing. I neither believe nor disbelieve the qualities which many attribute to Him; before theologians' and philosophers' definitions and lucubrations of this ineffable and inscrutable being I find myself smiling. Faced with the conviction of seeing myself confronting the supreme Problem, which confused voices seek to explain to me, I cannot but reply: 'It could be'; but the God that I foreknow is far more grand, far more good: Plus Supra!...I believe in (revelation); but not in revelation or revelations which each religion or religions claim to possess. Examining them impartially, comparing them and scrutinizing them, one cannot avoid discerning the human 'fingernail' and the stamp of the time in which they were written... No, let us not make God in our image, poor inhabitants that we are of a distant planet lost in infinite space. However, brilliant and sublime our intelligence may be, it is scarcely more than a small spark which shines and in an instant is extinguished, and it alone can give us no idea of that blaze, that conflagration, that ocean of light. I believe in revelation, but in that living revelation which surrounds us on every side, in that voice, mighty, eternal, unceasing, incorruptible, clear, distinct, universal as is the being from whom it proceeds, in that revelation which speaks to us and penetrates us from the moment we are born until we die. What books can better reveal to us the goodness of God, His love, His providence, His eternity, His glory, His wisdom? 'The heavens declare the glory of God, and the firmament showeth his handiwork.

His best friend, professor Ferdinand Blumentritt, kept him in touch with European friends and fellow-scientists who wrote a stream of letters which arrived in Dutch, French, German and English and which baffled the censors, delaying their transmittal. Those four years of his exile coincided with the development of the Philippine Revolution from inception and to its final breakout, which, from the viewpoint of the court which was to try him, suggested his complicity in it. He condemned the uprising, although all the members of the Katipunan had made him their honorary president and had used his name as a cry for war, unity, and liberty.

Statue of Pio Valenzuela's June 15, 1896, visit to José Rizal in Dapitan

He is known to making the resolution of bearing personal sacrifice instead of the incoming revolution, believing that a peaceful stand is the best way to avoid further suffering in the country and loss of Filipino lives. In Rizal's own words, "I consider myself happy for being able to suffer a little for a cause which I believe to be sacred [...]. I believe further that in any undertaking, the more one suffers for it, the surer its success. If this be fanaticism may God pardon me, but my poor judgment does not see it as such."

In Dapitan, Rizal wrote "Haec Est Sibylla Cumana", a parlor-game for his students, with questions and answers for which a wooden top was used. In 2004, Jean Paul Verstraeten traced this book and the wooden top, as well as Rizal's personal watch, spoon and salter.

=== Arrest and trial ===
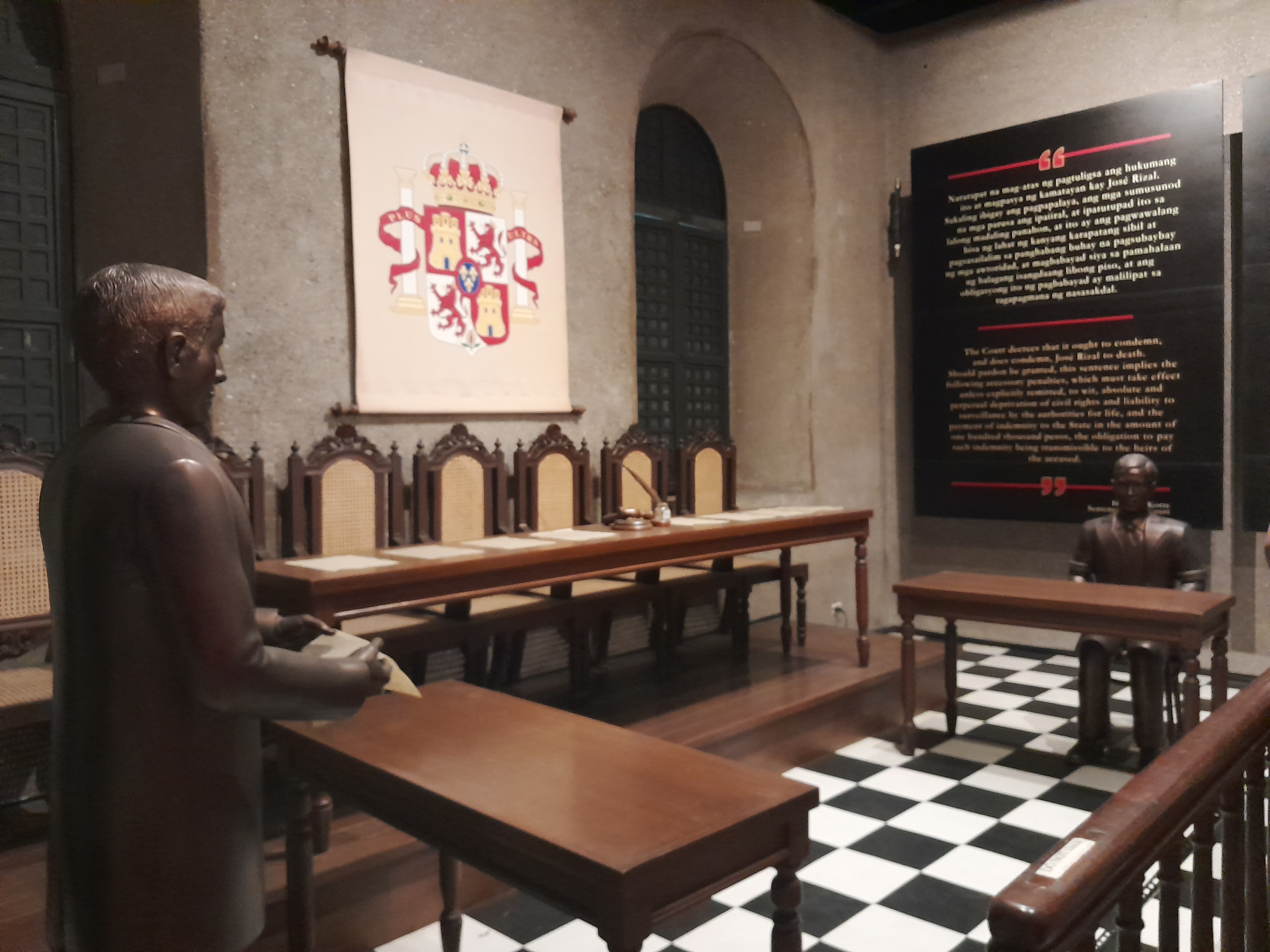
The statue of Rizal's trial at the Rizal Shrine in Fort Santiago

By 1896, the rebellion fomented by the Katipunan, a militant secret society, had become a full-blown revolution, proving to be a nationwide uprising. Rizal had earlier volunteered his services as a doctor in Cuba and was given leave by Governor-General Ramón Blanco to serve in Cuba to minister to victims of yellow fever. Rizal and Josephine left Dapitan on August 1, 1896, with letter of recommendation from Blanco.

Rizal was arrested en route to Cuba via Spain and was imprisoned in Barcelona on October 6, 1896. He was sent back the same day to Manila to stand trial as he was implicated in the revolution through his association with members of the Katipunan. During the entire passage, he was unchained, no Spaniard laid a hand on him, and he had many opportunities to escape but refused to do so.

While imprisoned in Fort Santiago, he issued a manifesto disavowing the current revolution in its present state and declaring that the education of Filipinos and their achievement of a national identity were prerequisites to freedom.

Rizal was tried before a court-martial for rebellion, sedition and conspiracy, and was convicted on all three charges and sentenced to death. Blanco, who was sympathetic to Rizal, had been forced out of office. The friars, led by then-Archbishop of Manila Bernardino Nozaleda had 'intercalated' Camilo de Polavieja in his stead as the new Spanish Governor-General of the Philippines after pressuring Queen-Regent Maria Cristina of Spain, thus sealing Rizal's fate.

== Execution ==
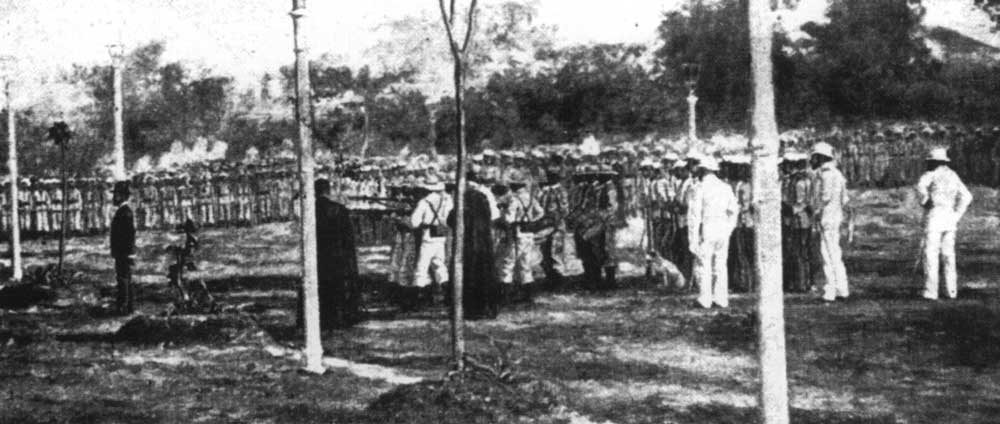
A photographic record of Rizal's execution in what was then Bagumbayan

Moments before his execution on December 30, 1896, by a squad of Filipino soldiers of the Spanish Army, a backup force of regular Spanish Army troops stood ready to shoot the executioners should they fail to obey orders. The Spanish Army Surgeon General requested to take his pulse: it was normal. Aware of this, the sergeant commanding the backup force hushed his men to silence when they began raising "vivas" with the highly partisan crowd of Peninsular and Mestizo Spaniards. His last words were those of Jesus Christ: "consummatum est" – "it is finished." (Note: Rizal's trial was regarded a travesty even by prominent Spaniards of his day. Soon after his execution, the philosopher Miguel de Unamuno in an impassioned utterance recognized Rizal as a "Spaniard", "...profoundly and intimately Spanish, far more Spanish than those wretched men—forgive them, Lord, for they knew not what they did—those wretched men, who over his still warm body hurled like an insult heavenward that blasphemous cry, 'Viva España!'" Miguel de Unamuno, epilogue to Wenceslao Retana's Vida y Escritos del Dr. José Rizal. (Retana, op. cit.))

A day before, Rizal's mother pleaded with the authorities to have Rizal's body placed under her family's custody as per Rizal's wish; this was unheeded but was later granted by Manuel Luengo, the civil governor of Manila. Immediately following the execution, Rizal was secretly buried in Pacò Cemetery (now Paco Park) in Manila with no identification on his grave, intentionally mismarked to mislead and discourage martyrdom.

His undated poem Mi último adiós, believed to have been written a few days before his execution, was hidden in an alcohol stove, which was later handed to his family with his few remaining possessions, including the final letters and his last bequests. During their visit, Rizal reminded his sisters in English, "There is something inside it", referring to the alcohol stove given by the Pardo de Taveras which was to be returned after his execution, thereby emphasizing the importance of the poem. This instruction was followed by another, "Look in my shoes", in which another item was secreted.

Rizal's execution, as well as those of other political dissidents (mostly anarchist) in Barcelona was ultimately invoked by Michele Angiolillo, an Italian anarchist, when he assassinated Spanish Prime Minister Antonio Canovas del Castillo.

=== Exhumation and re-burial ===
Rizal's original grave in Paco Park

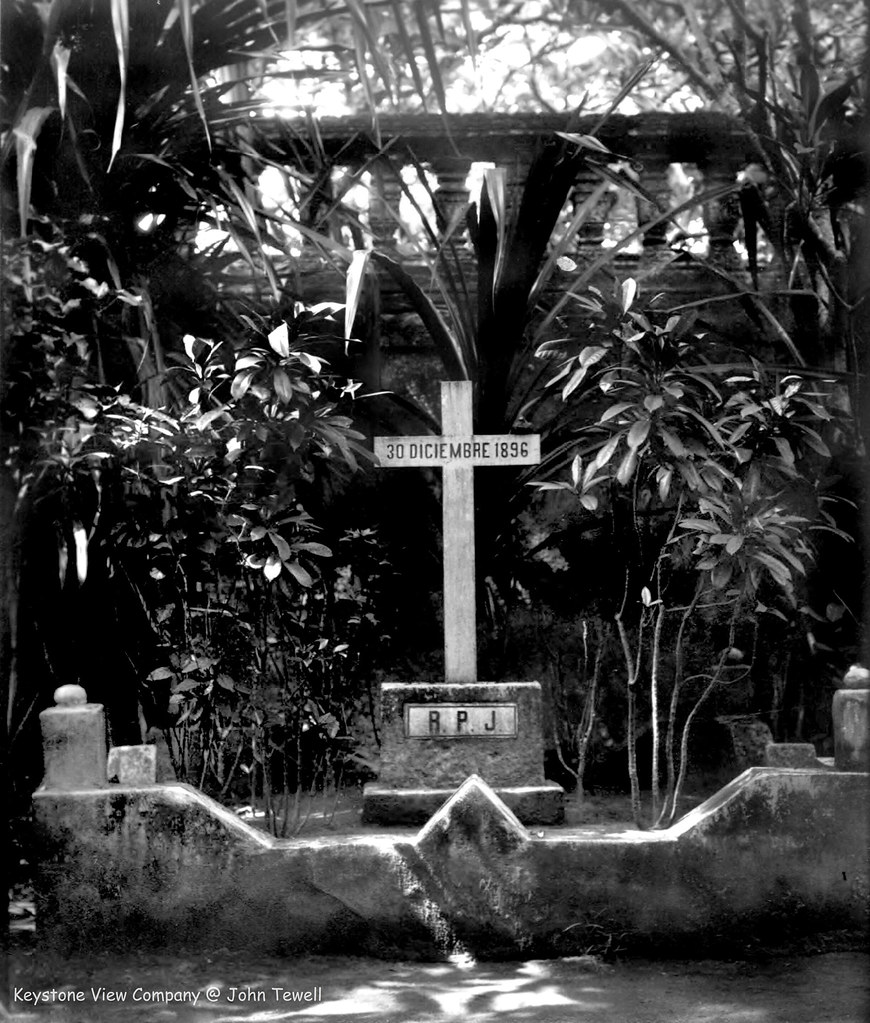
An undated photo, with the date written in Spanish

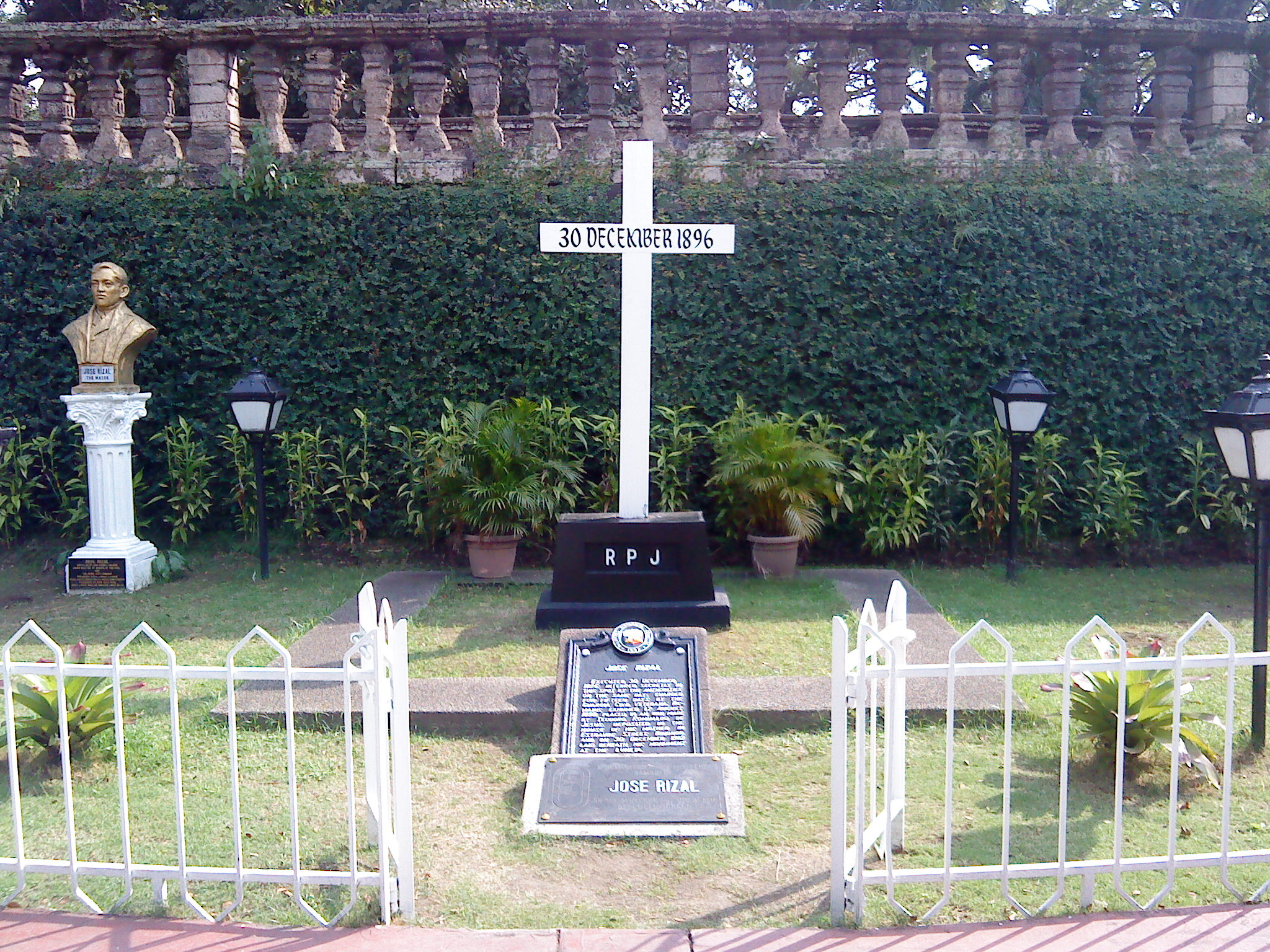
The grave after its renovation, with the date repainted in English and the bust added with some lampposts

Rizal's sister Narcisa toured all possible gravesites only for her efforts to end in vain. On one day, she visited Paco Cemetery and discovered guards posted at its gate, later finding Luengo, accompanied by two army officers, standing around a freshly-covered grave, which she assumed to be that of her brother's, on the reason that there had never been any ground burials at the site. After realizing that Rizal was buried in the spot, she made a gift to the caretaker and requested him to place a marble slab inscribed with "RPJ", Rizal's initials in reverse.

In August 1898, a few days after the Americans took Manila, Narcisa secured the consent of the American authorities to retrieve Rizal's remains. During the exhumation, it was then revealed that Rizal was not buried in a coffin but was wrapped in cloth before being dumped in the grave; his burial was not on sanctified ground granted to the 'confessed' faithful. The identity of the remains further confirmed by both the black suit and the shoes, both worn by Rizal on his execution, but whatever was in his shoes had disintegrated.

Following the exhumation, the remains were brought to the Rizal household in Binondo, where they were washed and cleaned before being placed in an ivory urn made by Romualdo Teodoro de los Reyes de Jesus. The urn remained in the household until December 28, 1912.

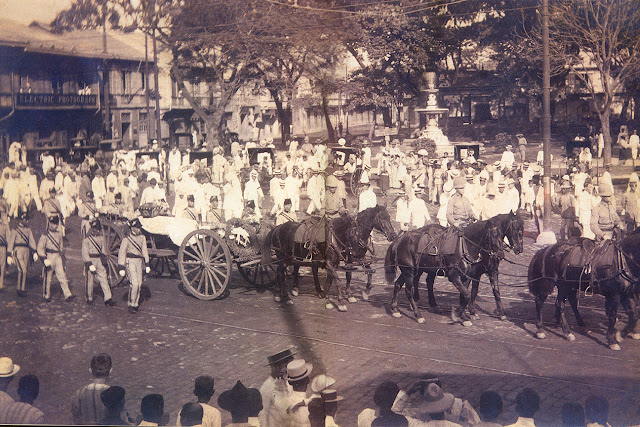
The funeral march transferring Rizal's urn to Bagumbayan (present-day Rizal Park), Manila, on December 30, 1912

On December 29, 1912, the urn was transferred from Binondo to the Marble Hall of the Ayuntamiento de Manila, the municipal building, in Intramuros where it remained on public display from 9:00 a.m. to 5:00 p.m., guarded by the Caballeros de Rizal. The public was given the chance to see the urn. The next day, in a solemn procession, the urn began its last journey from the Ayuntamiento to its last resting place in a spot in Bagumbayan (now renamed as Luneta), where the Rizal Monument would be built. Witnessed by his family, Rizal was finally buried in fitting rites. In a simultaneous ceremony, the corner stone for the Rizal monument was placed and the Rizal Monument Commission was created, headed by Tomas G. Del Rosario.

A year later, on December 30, 1913, the monument, designed and made by Swiss sculptor Richard Kissling, was inaugurated.

== Works and writings ==
Rizal wrote mostly in Spanish, the lingua franca of the Spanish East Indies, though some of his letters (for example Sa Mga Kababaihang Taga Malolos) were written in Tagalog. His works have since been translated into a number of languages including Tagalog and English.

=== Novels and essays ===
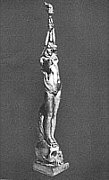
The Triumph of Science over Death, by Rizal

- "El amor patrio", 1882 essay
- "Toast to Juan Luna and Felix Hidalgo", 1884 speech given at Restaurante Ingles, Madrid
- Noli Me Tángere, 1887 novel (literally Latin for 'touch me not', from John 20:17)
- Alin Mang Lahi ("Whate'er the Race"), a Kundiman attributed to Dr. José Rizal
- "Sa Mga Kababaihang Taga-Malolos" (To the Young Women of Malolos), 1889 letter
- Annotations to Antonio de Morga's Sucesos de las Islas Filipinas, 1889
- "Filipinas dentro de cien años" (The Philippines a Century Hence), 1889–90 essay
- "Sobre la indolencia de los filipinos" (The Indolence of Filipinos), 1890 essay
- "Como se gobiernan las Filipinas" (Governing the Philippine islands), 1890 essay
- El filibusterismo, 1891 novel; sequel to Noli Me Tángere
- Una visita del Señor a Filipinas, also known as Friars and Filipinos, 14-page unfinished novel written in 1889
- Memorias de un Gallo, two-page unfinished satire
- Makamisa, unfinished Tagalog-language novel written in 1892

=== Poetry ===
- "Felicitación" (1874/75)
- "El embarque" (The Embarkation, 1875)
- "Por la educación recibe lustre la patria" (1876)
- "Un recuerdo á mi pueblo" (1876)
- "Al niño Jesús" (c. 1876)
- "A la juventud filipina" (To the Philippine Youth, 1879)
- "¡Me piden versos!" (1882)
- "Canto de María Clara" (from Noli Me Tángere, 1887)
- "Himno al trabajo" (Dalit sa Paggawa, 1888)
- "Kundiman" (disputed, 1889) - also attributed to Pedro Paterno
- "A mi musa" (To My Muse, 1890)
- "El canto del viajero" (1892–96)
- "Mi retiro" (1895)
- "Mi último adiós" (1896)
- "Mi primera inspiracion" (disputed) - also attributed to Antonio Lopez, Rizal's nephew

=== Plays ===
- El Consejo de los Dioses (The Council of Gods)
- Junto al Pasig (Along the Pasig)
- San Euistaquio, Mártyr (Saint Eustache, the Martyr)

=== Other works ===
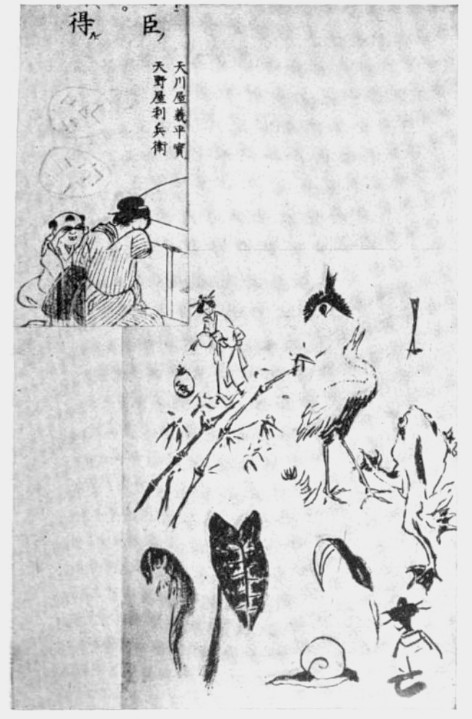
Sketch by Rizal imitating Japanese art, made during his trip in Japan, c. 1888

Rizal also tried his hand at painting and sculpture. His most famous sculptural work was The Triumph of Science over Death, a clay sculpture of a naked young woman with overflowing hair, standing on a skull while bearing a torch held high. The woman symbolized the ignorance of humankind during the Dark Ages, while the torch she bore symbolized the enlightenment science brings over the whole world. He sent the sculpture as a gift to his dear friend Ferdinand Blumentritt, together with another one named The Triumph of Death over Life.

The woman is shown trampling the skull, a symbol of death, to signify the victory the humankind achieved by conquering the bane of death through their scientific advancements. The original sculpture is now displayed at the Rizal Shrine at Fort Santiago in Intramuros, Manila. It has replicas inside the University of the Philippines Manila campus and in Alabang, Muntinlupa.

Rizal is also noted to be a carver and sculptor who made works from clay, plaster-of-Paris, and baticuling wood, the last being his preferred medium. While in exile in Dapitan, he served as a mentor to three Paete natives including José Caancan, who in turn taught three generations of carvers back in his hometown.

Rizal is known to have made 56 sculptural works, but only 18 of these are known to be still existing as of 2021.

== Reactions after death ==
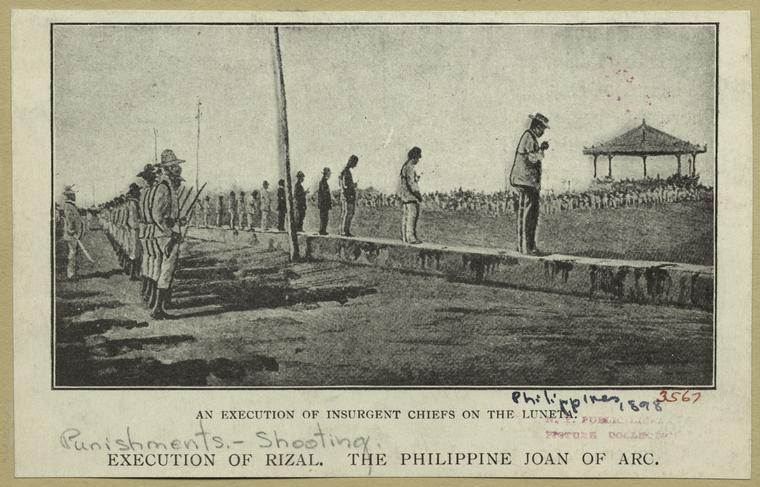
An engraving of the execution of Filipino insurgents at Bagumbayan (now Luneta)

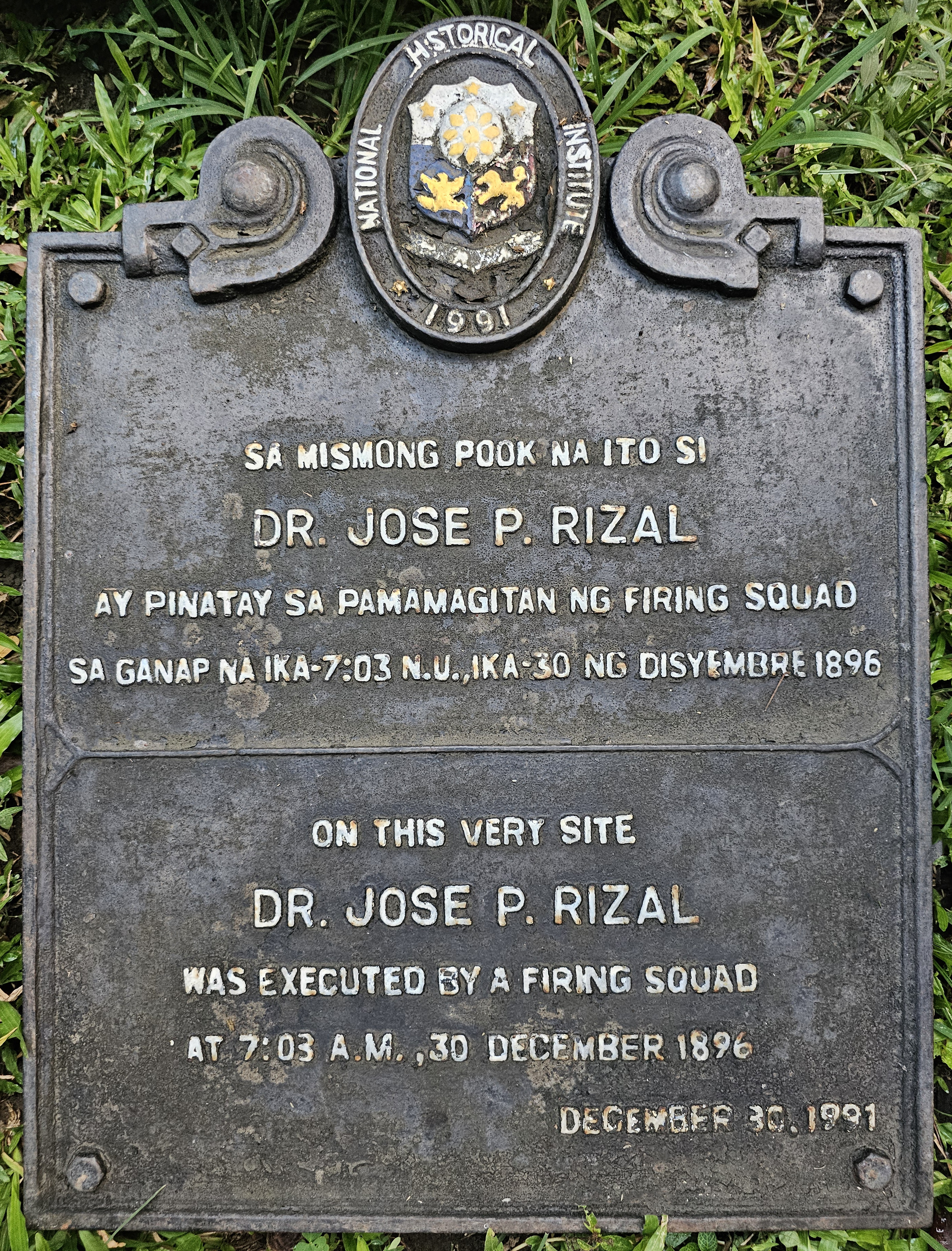
Historical marker of José Rizal's execution site

=== Retraction controversy ===
Several historians report that Rizal retracted his anti-Catholic ideas through a document which stated: "I retract with all my heart whatever in my words, writings, publications and conduct have been contrary to my character as a son of the Catholic Church." (Note: Me retracto de todo corazon de cuanto en mis palabras, escritos, impresos y conducta ha habido contrario á mi cualidad de hijo de la Iglesia Católica: Jesus Cavanna, Rizal's Unfading Glory: A Documentary History of the Conversion of Dr. José Rizal (Manila: 1983)) However, there are doubts of its authenticity given that there is no evidence Rizal ever entered into a canonical Catholic marriage with his common-law wife, Josephine Bracken. Also there is an allegation that the retraction document was a forgery.

After analyzing six major documents of Rizal, Ricardo Pascual concluded that the retraction document, said to have been discovered in 1935, was not in Rizal's handwriting. Senator Rafael Palma, a former President of the University of the Philippines and a prominent Mason, argued that a retraction is not in keeping with Rizal's character and mature beliefs. He called the retraction story a "pious fraud." Others who deny the retraction are Frank Laubach, a Protestant minister; Austin Coates, a British writer; and Ricardo Manapat, director of the National Archives.

Those who affirm the authenticity of Rizal's retraction are prominent Philippine historians such as Nick Joaquin, (Note: Joaquin, Nick, Rizal in Saga, Philippine National Centennial Commission, 1996:""It seems clear now that he did retract, that he went to confession, heard mass, received communion, and was married to Josephine, on the eve of his death".) Nicolas Zafra, León María Guerrero III, (Note: "That is a matter for handwriting experts, and the weight of expert opinion is in favor of authenticity. It is nonsense to say that the retraction does not prove Rizal's conversion; the language of the document is unmistakable.") Gregorio Zaide, Guillermo Gómez Rivera, Ambeth Ocampo, John N. Schumacher, Antonio M. Molina, Paul Dumol and Austin Craig. They take the retraction document as authentic, having been judged as such by a foremost expert on the writings of Rizal, Teodoro Kalaw (a 33rd degree Mason) and "handwriting experts...known and recognized in our courts of justice", H. Otley Beyer and José I. Del Rosario, both of UP.

Historians also refer to 11 eyewitnesses when Rizal wrote his retraction, signed a Catholic prayer book, and recited Catholic prayers, and the multitude who saw him kiss the crucifix before his execution. A great-grandnephew of Rizal, Fr. Marciano Guzman, cites that Rizal's 4 confessions were certified by 5 eyewitnesses, 10 qualified witnesses, 7 newspapers, and 12 historians and writers including Aglipayan bishops, Masons and anti-clericals. One witness was the head of the Spanish Supreme Court at the time of his notarized declaration and was highly esteemed by Rizal for his integrity.

Because of what he sees as the strength these direct evidence have in the light of the historical method, in contrast with merely circumstantial evidence, UP professor emeritus of history Nicolas Zafra called the retraction "a plain unadorned fact of history." Guzmán attributes the denial of retraction to "the blatant disbelief and stubbornness" of some Masons. To explain the retraction Guzman said that the factors are the long discussion and debate which appealed to reason and logic that he had with Fr. Balaguer, the visits of his mentors and friends from the Ateneo, and the grace of God due to the numerous prayers of religious communities.

Supporters see in the retraction Rizal's "moral courage...to recognize his mistakes," (Note: The retraction, Javier de Pedro contends, is the end of a process which started with a personal crisis as Rizal finished the Fili.) his reversion to the "true faith", and thus his "unfading glory," and a return to the "ideals of his fathers" which "did not diminish his stature as a great patriot; on the contrary, it increased that stature to greatness." On the other hand, lawyer and senator José W. Diokno stated at a human rights lecture, "Surely whether Rizal died as a Catholic or an apostate adds or detracts nothing from his greatness as a Filipino... Catholic or Mason, Rizal is still Rizal – the hero who courted death 'to prove to those who deny our patriotism that we know how to die for our duty and our beliefs'."

=== "Mi último adiós" ===
The poem is more aptly titled "Adiós, Patria Adorada" (literally "Farewell, Beloved Fatherland"), by virtue of logic and literary tradition, the words coming from the first line of the poem itself. It first appeared in print not in Manila but in Hong Kong in 1897, when a copy of the poem and an accompanying photograph came to J. P. Braga who decided to publish it in a monthly journal he edited. There was a delay when Braga, who greatly admired Rizal, wanted a good facsimile of the photograph and sent it to be engraved in London, a process taking well over two months. It finally appeared under "Mi último pensamiento," a title he supplied and by which it was known for a few years. Thus, the Jesuit Balaguer's anonymous account of the retraction and the marriage to Josephine was published in Barcelona before word of the poem's existence had reached him and he could revise what he had written. His account was too elaborate for Rizal to have had time to write "Adiós."

Six years after his death, when the Philippine Organic Act of 1902 was being debated in the United States Congress, Representative Henry Cooper of Wisconsin rendered an English translation of Rizal's valedictory poem capped by the peroration, "Under what clime or what skies has tyranny claimed a nobler victim?" Subsequently, the US Congress passed the bill into law, which is now known as the Philippine Organic Act of 1902.

This was a major breakthrough for a US Congress that had yet to grant the equal rights to African Americans guaranteed to them in the US Constitution and at a time the Chinese Exclusion Act was still in effect. It created the Philippine legislature, appointed two Filipino delegates to the US Congress, extended the US Bill of Rights to Filipinos and laid the foundation for an autonomous government. The colony was on its way to independence. The United States passed the Jones Law that made the legislature fully autonomous until 1916 but did not recognize Philippine independence until the Treaty of Manila in 1946—fifty years after Rizal's death. This same poem, which has inspired independence activists across the region and beyond, was recited (in its Indonesian translation by Rosihan Anwar) by Indonesian soldiers of independence before going into battle.

=== Later life of Bracken ===
Josephine Bracken, whom Rizal addressed as his wife on his last day, promptly joined the revolutionary forces in Cavite province, making her way through thicket and mud across enemy lines, and helped reloading spent cartridges at the arsenal in Imus under the revolutionary General Pantaleón García. Imus came under threat of recapture that the operation was moved, with Bracken, to Maragondon, the mountain redoubt in Cavite.

She witnessed the Tejeros Convention prior to returning to Manila and was summoned by the Governor-General, but owing to her stepfather's American citizenship she could not be forcibly deported. She left voluntarily returning to Hong Kong. She later married another Filipino, Vicente Abad, a mestizo acting as agent for the Tabacalera firm in the Philippines. She died of tuberculosis in Hong Kong on March 15, 1902, and was buried at the Happy Valley Cemetery. She was immortalized by Rizal in the last stanza of Mi Ultimo Adios: "Farewell, sweet stranger, my friend, my joy...".

=== Polavieja and Blanco ===
Polavieja faced condemnation by his countrymen after his return to Spain. While visiting Girona, in Catalonia, circulars were distributed among the crowd bearing Rizal's last verses, his portrait, and the charge that Polavieja was responsible for the loss of the Philippines to Spain. Ramon Blanco later presented his sash and sword to the Rizal family as an apology.

== Criticism and controversies ==
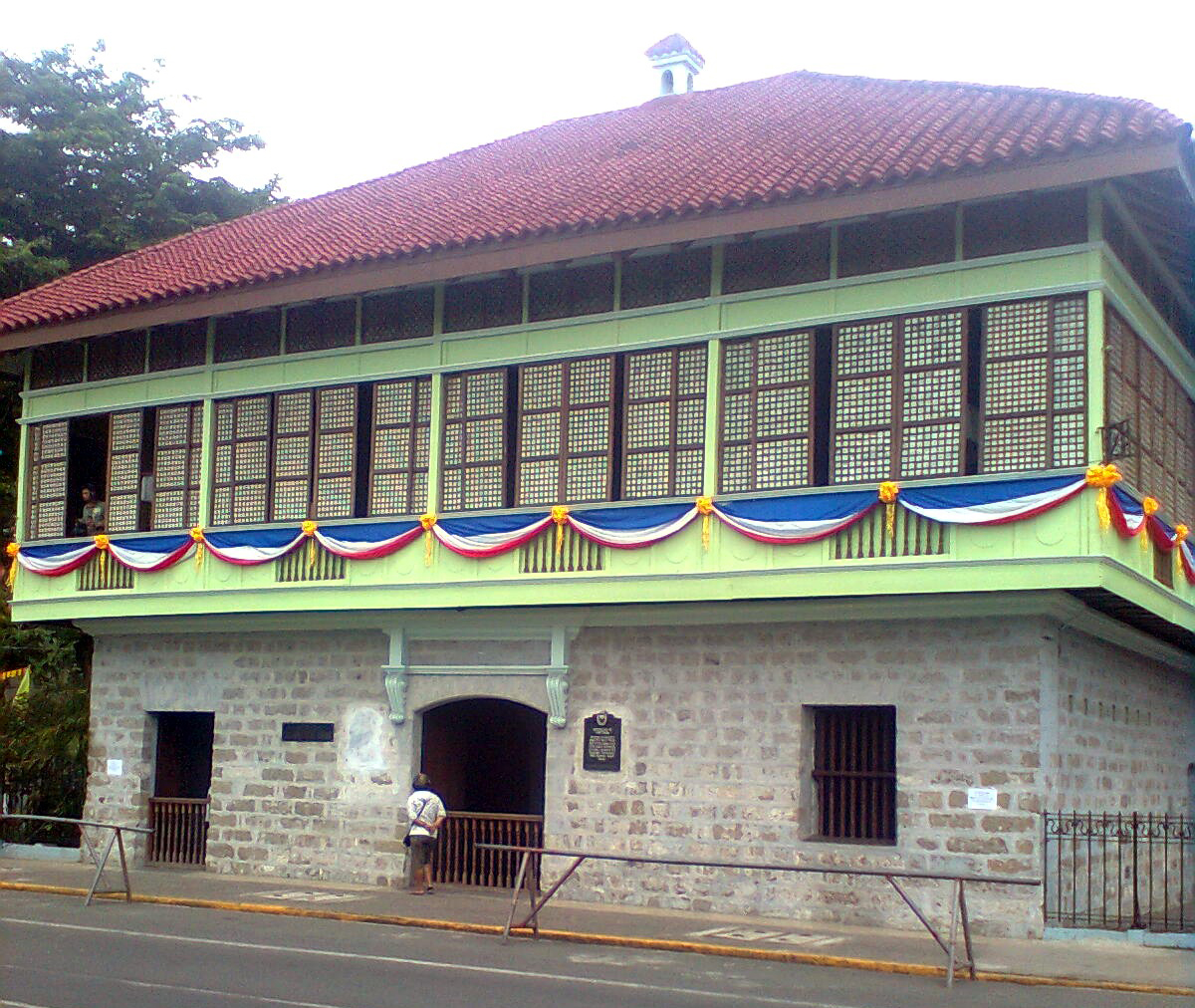
Rizal Shrine in Calamba, Laguna, the ancestral house and birthplace of José Rizal, is now a museum housing Rizal memorabilia.

Attempts to debunk legends surrounding Rizal, and the tug of war between freethinker and Catholic, have kept his legacy controversial.

=== National hero status ===
The confusion over Rizal's real stance on the Philippine Revolution leads to the sometimes bitter question of his ranking as the nation's premier hero. But then again, according to the National Historical Commission of the Philippines (NHCP) Section Chief Teodoro Atienza, and Filipino historian Ambeth Ocampo, there is no Filipino historical figure, including Rizal, that was officially declared a national hero through law or executive order, although, there were laws and proclamations honoring Filipino heroes.

==== Made national hero by colonial Americans ====
Some suggest that Jose Rizal was made a legislated national hero by the American forces occupying the Philippines. In 1901, the American Governor General William Howard Taft suggested that the U.S.-sponsored Philippine Commission name Rizal a national hero for Filipinos. Jose Rizal was an ideal candidate, favourable to the American occupiers since he was dead, and non-violent, a favourable quality which, if emulated by Filipinos, would not threaten the American rule or change the status quo of the occupiers of the Philippine islands. Rizal did not advocate independence for the Philippines either. Subsequently, the US-sponsored commission passed Act No. 346 which set the anniversary of Rizal's death as a "day of observance."

Renato Constantino writes Rizal is a "United States-sponsored hero" who was promoted as the greatest Filipino hero during the American colonial period of the Philippines – after Aguinaldo lost the Philippine–American War. The United States promoted Rizal, who represented peaceful political advocacy (in fact, repudiation of violent means in general) instead of more radical figures whose ideas could inspire resistance against American rule. Rizal was selected over Andrés Bonifacio who was viewed "too radical" and Apolinario Mabini who was considered "unregenerate."

==== Made national hero by Emilio Aguinaldo ====
On the other hand, numerous sources quote that it was General Emilio Aguinaldo, and not the second Philippine Commission, who first recognized December 30 as "national day of mourning" in memory of Rizal and other victims of Spanish tyranny. As per them, the first celebration of Rizal Day was held in Manila on December 30, 1898, under the sponsorship of the Club Filipino.

The veracity of both claims seems to be justified and hence difficult to ascertain. However, most historians agree that a majority of Filipinos were unaware of Rizal during his lifetime, as he was a member of the richer elite classes (he was born in an affluent family, had lived abroad for nearly as long as he had lived in the Philippines) and wrote primarily in an elite language (at that time, Tagalog and Cebuano were the languages of the masses) about ideals as lofty as freedom (the masses were more concerned about day to day issues like earning money and making a living, something which has not changed much today).

Teodoro Agoncillo opines that the Philippine national hero, unlike those of other countries, is not "the leader of its liberation forces". He gives the opinion that Andrés Bonifacio not replace Rizal as national hero, as some have suggested, but that be honored alongside him.

Constantino's analysis has been criticised for its polemicism and inaccuracies regarding Rizal. The historian Rafael Palma, contends that the revolution of Bonifacio is a consequence wrought by the writings of Rizal and that although the Bonifacio's revolver produced an immediate outcome, the pen of Rizal generated a more lasting achievement.

=== Critiques of books ===
Others present him as a man of contradictions. Miguel de Unamuno in "Rizal: the Tagalog Hamlet", said of him, "a soul that dreads the revolution although deep down desires it. He pivots between fear and hope, between faith and despair." His critics assert this character flaw is translated into his two novels where he opposes violence in Noli Me Tángere and appears to advocate it in Fili, contrasting Ibarra's idealism to Simoun's cynicism. His defenders insist this ambivalence is trounced when Simoun is struck down in the sequel's final chapters, reaffirming the author's resolute stance, Pure and spotless must the victim be if the sacrifice is to be acceptable.

Many thinkers tend to find the characters of María Clara and Ibarra (Noli Me Tángere) poor role models, María Clara being too frail, and young Ibarra being too accepting of circumstances, rather than being courageous and bold.

In El Filibusterismo, Rizal had Father Florentino say: "...our liberty will (not) be secured at the sword's point...we must secure it by making ourselves worthy of it. And when a people reaches that height God will provide a weapon, the idols will be shattered, tyranny will crumble like a house of cards and liberty will shine out like the first dawn." Rizal's attitude to the Philippine Revolution is also debated, not only based on his own writings, but also due to the varying eyewitness accounts of Pío Valenzuela, a doctor who in 1895 had consulted Rizal in Dapitan on behalf of Bonifacio and the Katipunan.

=== Role in the Philippine Revolution ===
Upon the outbreak of the Philippine Revolution in 1896, Valenzuela surrendered to the Spanish authorities and testified in military court that Rizal had strongly condemned an armed struggle for independence when Valenzuela asked for his support. Rizal had even refused him entry to his house. Bonifacio, in turn, had openly denounced him as a coward for his refusal. (Note: Bonifacio later mobilized his men to attempt to liberate Rizal while in Fort Santiago. (Laubach, op.cit., chap. 15))

However, years later, Valenzuela testified that Rizal had been favorable to an uprising as long as the Filipinos were well-prepared, and well-supplied with arms. Rizal had suggested that the Katipunan get wealthy and influential Filipino members of society on their side, or at least ensure they would stay neutral. Rizal had even suggested his friend Antonio Luna to lead the revolutionary forces since he had studied military science. (Note: Antonio Luna denounced the Katipunan, but became a general under Emilio Aguinaldo's First Republic and fought in the Philippine–American War.) In the event that the Katipunan was discovered prematurely, they should fight rather than allow themselves to be killed. Valenzuela said to historian Teodoro Agoncillo that he had lied to the Spanish military authorities about Rizal's true stance toward a revolution in an attempt to exculpate him.

Before his execution, Rizal wrote a proclamation denouncing the revolution. But as noted by historian Floro Quibuyen, his final poem Mi ultimo adios contains a stanza which equates his coming execution and the rebels then dying in battle as fundamentally the same, as both are dying for their country.

== Legacy and remembrance ==
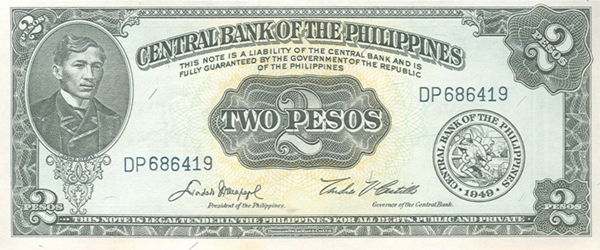
José Rizal in ₱2 note

Rizal was a contemporary of Gandhi, Tagore and Sun Yat Sen who also advocated liberty through peaceful means rather than by violent revolution. Coinciding with the appearance of those other leaders, Rizal from an early age had been enunciating in poems, tracts and plays, ideas all his own of modern nationhood as a practical possibility in Asia. In Noli Me Tángere, he stated that if European civilization had nothing better to offer, colonialism in Asia was doomed. (Note: Also stated in Rizal's essay, "The Philippines: A Century Hence", The batteries are gradually becoming charged and if the prudence of the government does not provide an outlet for the currents that are accumulating, someday the sparks will be generated. (read etext at Project Gutenberg))

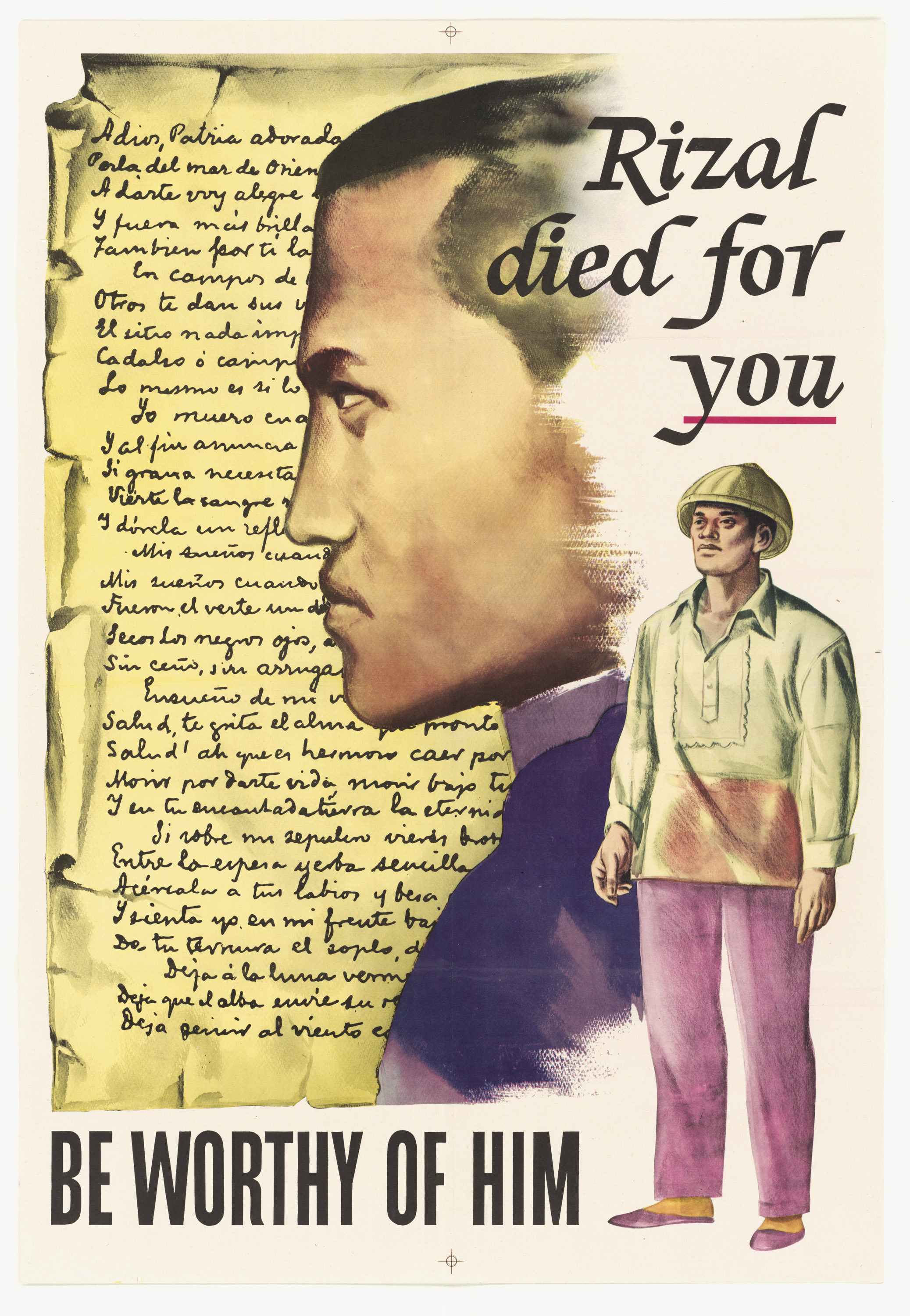
Government poster from the 1950s

Though popularly mentioned, especially on blogs, there is no evidence to suggest that Gandhi or Nehru may have corresponded with Rizal, nor have they mentioned him in any of their memoirs or letters. But it was documented by Rizal's biographer, Austin Coates who interviewed Jawaharlal Nehru and Gandhi that Rizal was mentioned, specifically in Nehru's prison letters to his daughter Indira.

As a political figure, José Rizal was the founder of La Liga Filipina, a civic organization that subsequently gave birth to the Katipunan led by Andrés Bonifacio, (Note: Bonifacio was a member of La Liga Filipina. After Rizal's arrest and exile, it was disbanded and the group splintered into two factions; the more radical group formed into the Katipunan, the militant arm of the insurrection.), a secret society which would start the Philippine Revolution against Spain that eventually laid the foundation of the First Philippine Republic under Emilio Aguinaldo. He was a proponent of achieving Philippine self-government peacefully through institutional reform rather than through violent revolution, and would only support "violent means" as a last resort. Rizal believed that the only justification for national liberation and self-government was the restoration of the dignity of the people, (Note: Rizal's annotations of Morga's Sucesos de las islas Filipinas (1609), which he copied word for word from the British Museum and had published, called attention to an antiquated book, a testimony to the well-advanced civilization in the Philippines during pre-Spanish era. In his essay "The Indolence of the Filipino" Rizal stated that three centuries of Spanish rule did not do much for the advancement of his countryman; in fact there was a 'retrogression', and the Spanish colonialists have transformed him into a 'half-way brute.' The absence of moral stimulus, the lack of material inducement, the demoralization--'the indio should not be separated from his carabao', the endless wars, the lack of a national sentiment, the Chinese piracy—all these factors, according to Rizal, helped the colonial rulers succeed in placing the indio 'on a level with the beast'. (Read English translation by Charles Derbyshire at Project Gutenberg.)) saying "Why independence, if the slaves of today will be the tyrants of tomorrow?" However, through careful examination of his works and statements, including Mi Ultimo Adios, Rizal reveals himself as a revolutionary. His image as the Tagalog Christ also intensified early reverence to him.

Rizal, through his reading of Morga and other western historians, knew of the genial image of Spain's early relations with his people. In his writings, he showed the disparity between the early colonialists and those of his day, with the latter's injustices giving rise to Gomburza and the Philippine Revolution of 1896. The English biographer, Austin Coates, and writer, Benedict Anderson, believe that Rizal gave the Philippine revolution a genuinely national character; and that Rizal's patriotism and his standing as one of Asia's first intellectuals have inspired others of the importance of a national identity to nation-building. (Note: According to Anderson, Rizal is one of the best exemplars of nationalist thinking. (See also Nitroglycerine in the Pomegranate, Benedict Anderson, New Left Review 27, May–June 2004 (subscription required))) Rizal envisioned a Philippines where all Filipinos, regardless of their ethnic or social background, could live together in peace and harmony.

The Belgian researcher Jean Paul "JP" Verstraeten authored several books about Jose Rizal: Rizal in Belgium and France, Jose Rizal's Europe, Growing up like Rizal (published by the National Historical Institute and in teacher's programs all over the Philippines), Reminiscences and Travels of Jose Rizal and Jose Rizal "Pearl of Unselfishness". He received an award from the president of the Philippines "in recognition of his unwavering support and commitment to promote the health and education of disadvantaged Filipinos, and his invaluable contribution to engender the teachings and ideals of Dr. Jose Rizal in the Philippines and in Europe". One of the greatest researchers about Rizal nowadays is Lucien Spittael.

Rizal enjoys a contemporary following from various groups collectively known as the Rizalistas. The Order of the Knights of Rizal, a civic and patriotic organization, boasts of dozens of chapters all over the globe. There are some remote-area religious sects who venerate Rizal as a Folk saint collectively known as the Rizalista religious movements, who claim him as a sublimation of Christ. Felix Manalo of the new religious movement known as the Iglesia ni Cristo claimed that Rizal was holy (banal), and preached that they owed their religious freedom from Rizal. In September 1903, he was canonized as a saint in the Philippine Independent Church, however, it was revoked in the 1950s.

=== Species named after Rizal ===
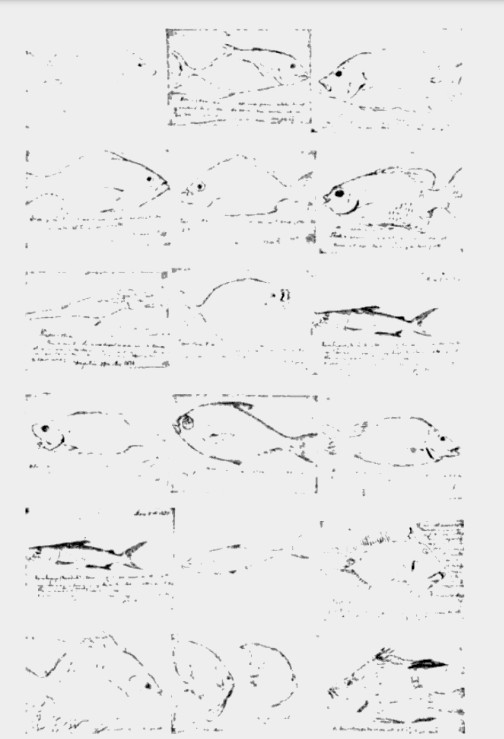
Drawings by Jose Rizal of the different species of fish found in Dapitan, c. 1890s

José Rizal was imprisoned at Fort Santiago and soon after he was banished at Dapitan where he plunged himself into studying nature. He was then able to collect a number of species of various classes: insects, butterflies, amphibians, reptiles, shells, snakes, and plants.

Rizal sent many specimens of animals, insects, and plants for identification to the (Anthropological and Ethnographical Museum of Dresden), Dresden Museum of Ethnology. It was not in his interest to receive any monetary payment; all he wanted were scientific books, magazines, and surgical instruments which he needed and used in Dapitan.

During his exile, Rizal also secretly sent several specimens of flying dragons to Europe. He believed that they were a new species. The German zoologist Benno Wandolleck named them Draco rizali after Rizal. However, it has since been discovered that the species had already been described by the Belgian-British zoologist George Albert Boulenger in 1885 as Draco guentheri.

There are three animal species that Rizal personally collected specimens of and that were posthumously named after him:

- Draco rizali – a small lizard known as a flying dragon (now Draco guentheri)
- Apogonia rizali – a very rare kind of beetle with five horns
- Rhacophorus rizali – a peculiar frog species, now synonymized with Rhacophorus pardalis.

There are also other genera and species discovered afterward in the Philippines that have been explicitly dedicated to the memory of Rizal:

- Aedes rizali – a mosquito
- Cardiodactylus rizali – a cricket
- Conus rizali – a sea snail
- Hogna rizali – a spider
- Kalayaan rizali – a mite
- Metaeuchromius rizali – a moth
- Pachyrhynchus rizali – a weevil
- Rizalthus – a genus of gorilla crabs
- Spathomeles rizali – a beetle

Apart from these, entomologist Nathan Banks applied the specific epithet rizali to a number of insect species from the Philippines (Chrysopa rizali, Ecnomus rizali, Hemerobius rizali, Hydropsyche rizali, Java rizali, Psocus rizali, etc.). Though he did not explain why, it was probably intended as a homage to Rizal as well.

=== Historical commemoration ===
- Although his field of action lay in politics, Rizal's real interests lay in the arts and sciences, in literature and in his profession as an ophthalmologist. Shortly after his death, the Anthropological Society of Berlin met to honor him with a reading of a German translation of his farewell poem and Rudolf Virchow delivering the eulogy.
- The Rizal Monument now stands near the place where he fell at the Luneta in Bagumbayan, which is now called Rizal Park, a national park in Manila. The monument, which also contains his remains, was designed by the Swiss Richard Kissling, who also sculpted the William Tell statue in Altdorf, Uri. (Note: Rizal himself translated Schiller's William Tell into Tagalog in 1886.) The monument carries the inscription: "I want to show to those who deprive people the right to love of country, that when we know how to sacrifice ourselves for our duties and convictions, death does not matter if one dies for those one loves – for his country and for others dear to him."
- The Taft Commission in June 1901 approved Act No. 137 creating the province of Rizal out of the old District of Morong and Province of Manila. Today, the wide acceptance of Rizal is evidenced by the countless towns, streets, and numerous parks in the Philippines named in his honor.
- Republic Act No. 1425, known as the Rizal Law, was passed in 1956 by the Philippine legislature requiring all high schools and colleges to offer courses about his life, works and writings.
- Yearly on June 19, a special non-working holiday in commemoration of his birth is observed at his home province of Laguna.
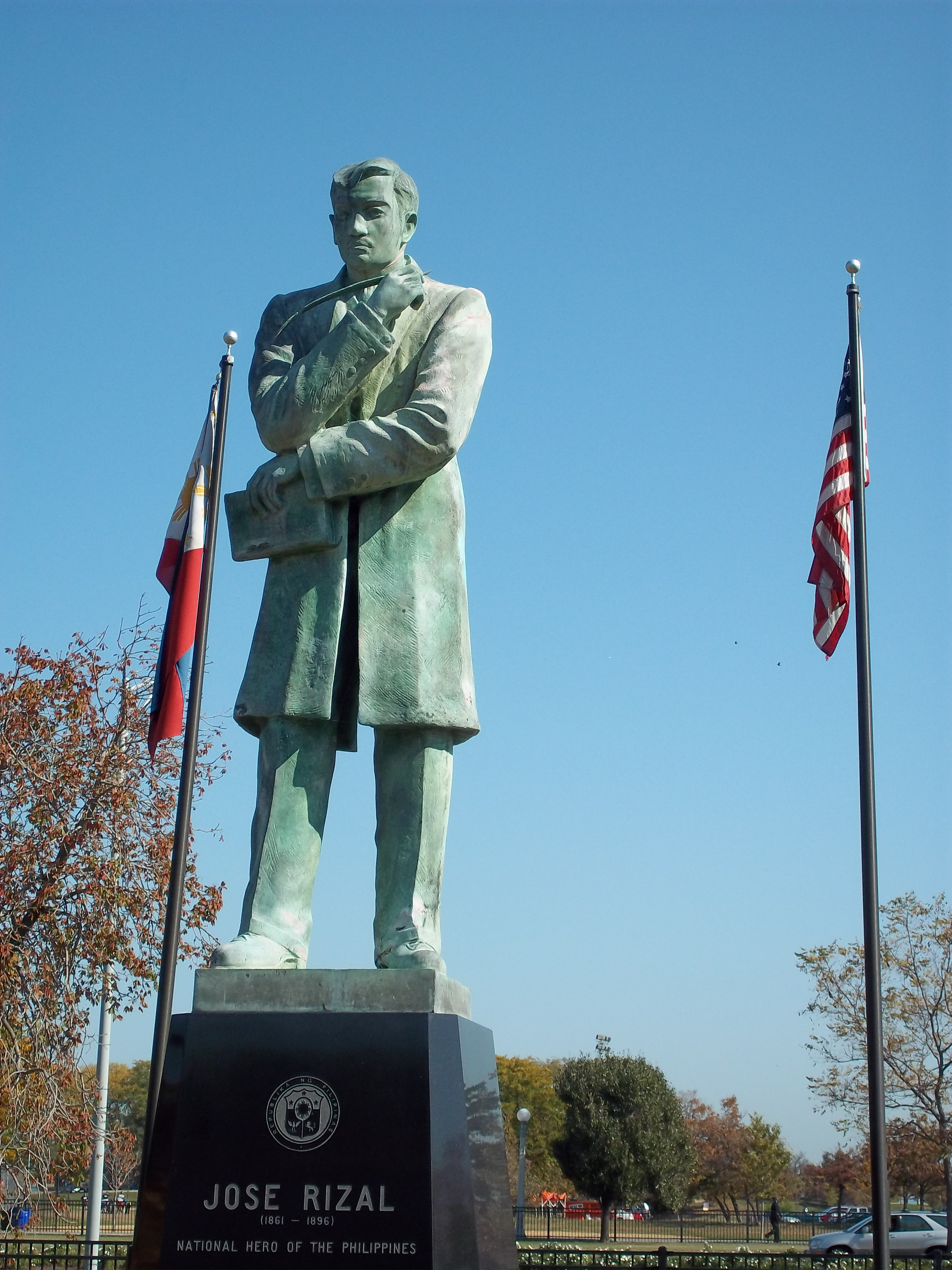
- Rizal monument in Uptown, Chicago
  Monuments erected in his honor can be found in Madrid; Cádiz, Spain; Tokyo; Wilhelmsfeld, Germany; Jinjiang, China; Chicago; Jersey City, New Jersey; Cherry Hill, New Jersey; Honolulu; San Diego; Los Angeles, including the suburbs of Carson and West Covina (both near the headquarters of Seafood City); Mexico City; Lima, Peru; Litoměřice, Czech Republic; Toronto; Markham; and Montreal, Canada.
- Monuments sculpted in honor of Rizal are also built at various town plazas or city parks in various towns and cities in the Philippines, usually found in the poblacion.
- A two-sided marker bearing a painting of Rizal by Fabián de la Rosa on one side and a bronze bust relief of him by Philippine artist Guillermo Tolentino stands at the Asian Civilisations Museum Green marking his visits to Singapore in 1882, 1887, 1891 and 1896.
- A Rizal bronze bust was erected at La Molina District, Lima, Peru, designed by Czech sculptor Hanstroff, mounted atop a pedestal base with four inaugural plaque markers with the following inscription on one: "Dr. José P. Rizal, Héroe Nacional de Filipinas, Nacionalista, Reformador Political, Escritor, Lingüistica y Poeta, 1861–1896."
- A Rizal bust sits in front of the Filipino American Council of Chicago, celebrating a one-day visit Rizal made to Chicago on May 11, 1888, as seen below.
- A plaque marks the Wilhelmsfeld building where he trained with Professor Becker. There is a small park in Wilhelmsfeld named after Rizal with a bronze statue of Rizal, and the street where he lived on was also renamed after him. Wilhelmsfeld's local government gifted the sandstone fountain in Pastor Ullmer's house garden where Rizal lived to the Philippine government and is now located at Rizal Park in Manila.
- In Heidelberg, a small stretch along the Neckar River is named after Rizal. In 2014, a commemorative sandstone plaque was placed there in Rizal's honor.
- Throughout 2011, the National Historical Institute and other institutions organized several activities commemorating the 150th birth anniversary of Rizal, which took place on June 19 of that year.
- The London Borough of Camden placed a Blue Plaque at 37 Chalcot Crescent, where Rizal lived for some time, with the words: "Dr. José Rizal, Writer and National Hero of the Philippines".
- A monument in honor of Rizal was planned, and built in Rome.
- In the City of Philadelphia, the 'City of Murals' first Filipino mural in the US east coast honoring José Rizal was to unveiled to the public in time for Rizal's Sesquicentennial year-long celebration.
- The Grand Oriental Hotel in Colombo, Sri Lanka has a suite named after Jose P. Rizal as he had stayed there in May 1882.
- The USS Rizal (DD-174) was a Wickes-class destroyer named after Rizal by the United States Navy and launched on September 21, 1918.
- The José Rizal Bridge and Rizal Park in the city of Seattle are dedicated to Rizal.
- On June 19, 2019, on Rizal's 158th birth anniversary, he was honored with a Google Doodle.
- A bronze bust of Rizal by F.B. Case was gifted to the City of Toronto by the Government of the Philippines in 1998. It is located at Earl Bales Park in the neighborhood of Lansing.
- A monument by Mogi Mogado was unveiled at Luneta Gardens (a similar name as that of the park where Rizal is buried—Luneta Park or now as Rizal Park) in 2019 as a gift from the Filipino Canadian community of Markham to the City of Markham. It is located in the Box Grove area of Markham, Ontario, near Rizal Avenue, which is also named for him.
- A Jose Rizal-class frigate of the Philippine Navy was built by Hyundai Heavy Industries. Two ships were ordered in 2016. They are the first guided missile frigate to enter service with the Philippine Navy. The lead ship, BRP Jose Rizal, arrived in the Philippines on May 22, 2020.
- In the 9th arrondissement of Paris, Place José Rizal is a small square named after Rizal. In 2022, a bust of Rizal (by sculptor Gérard Lartigue) was erected in the square which is in the Rue de Maubeuge, a street frequented by Rizal.
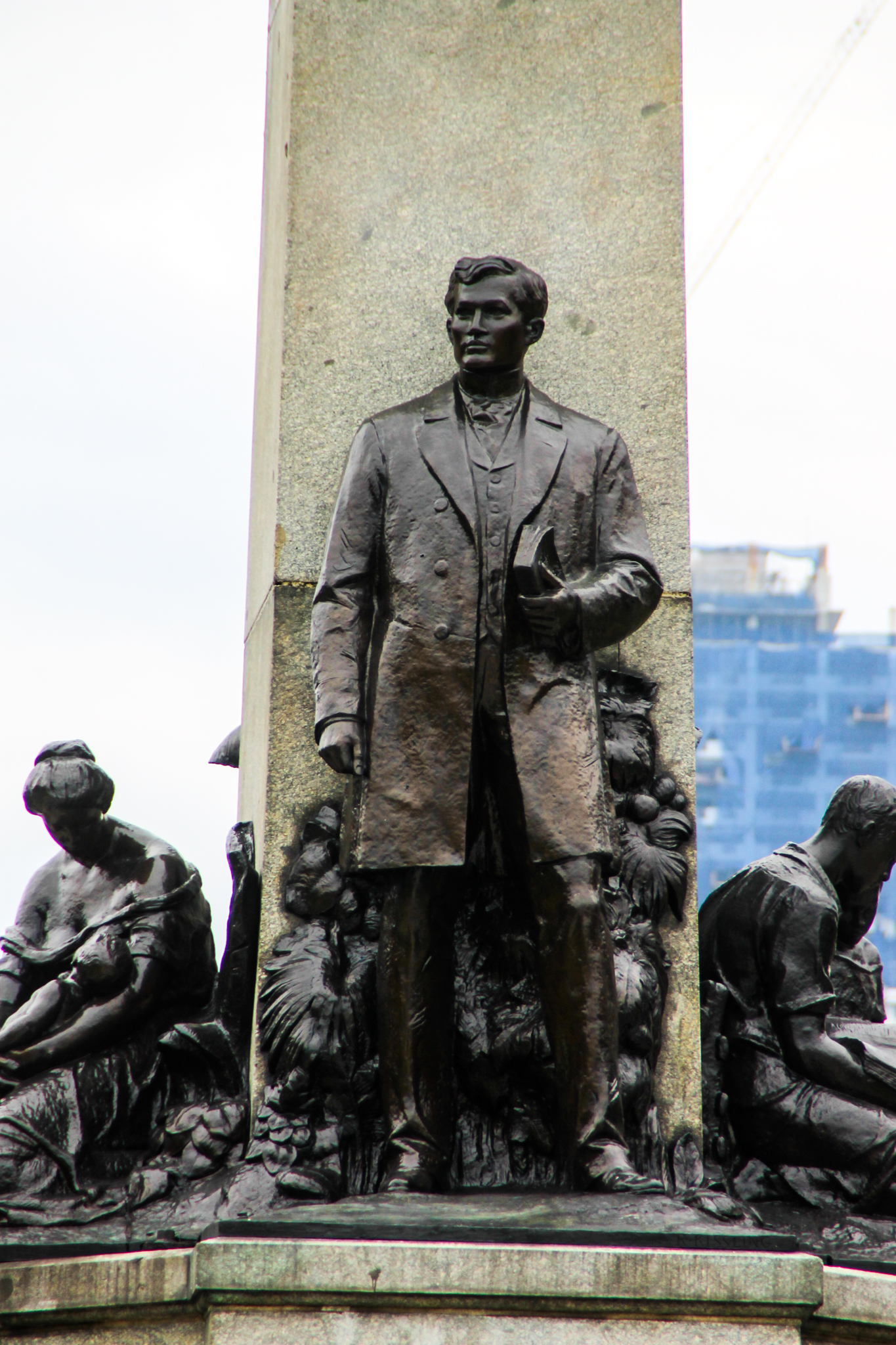
Close-up image of Rizal's statue at the Rizal Monument in Manila

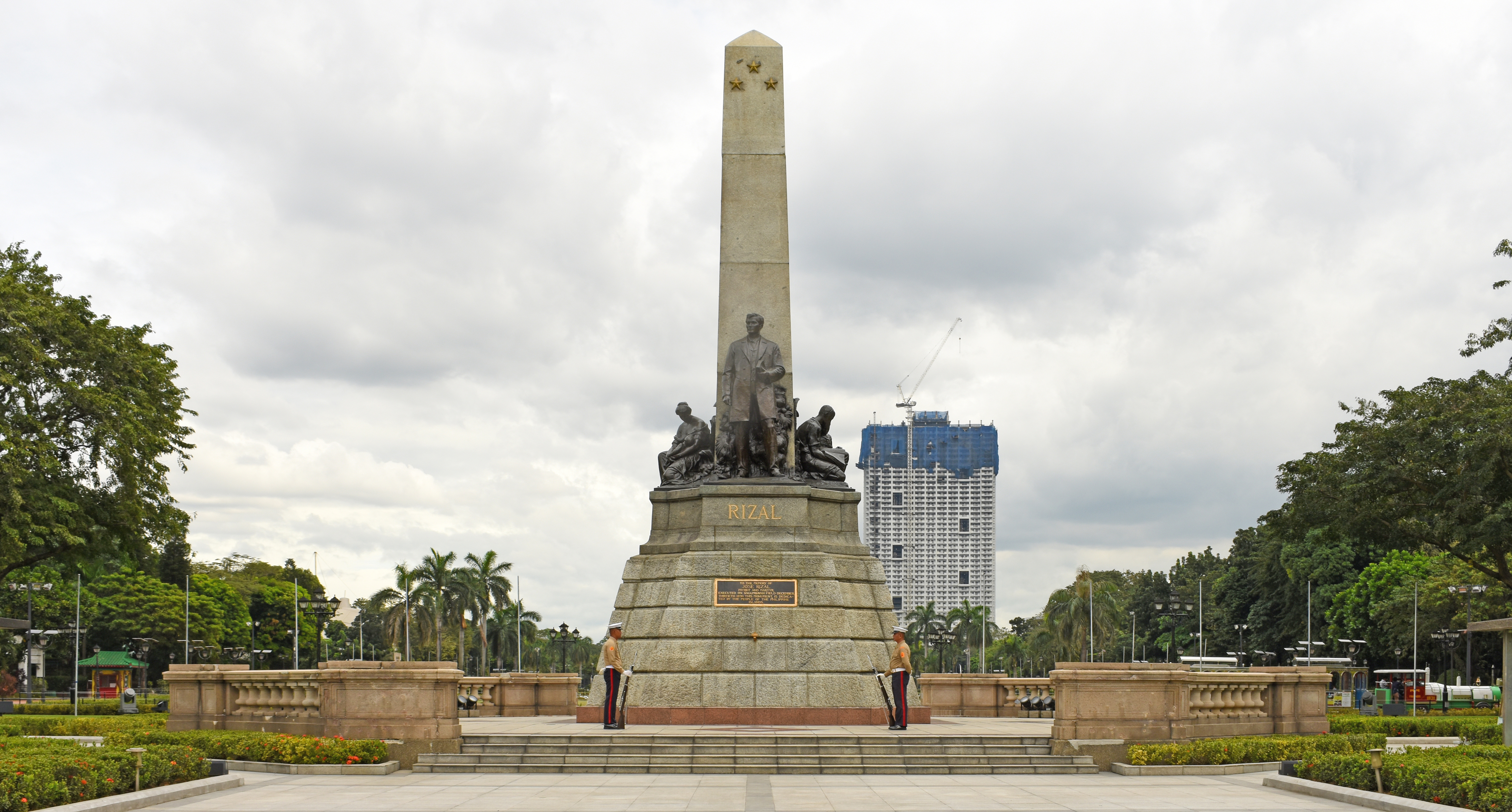
Rizal Monument, Manila

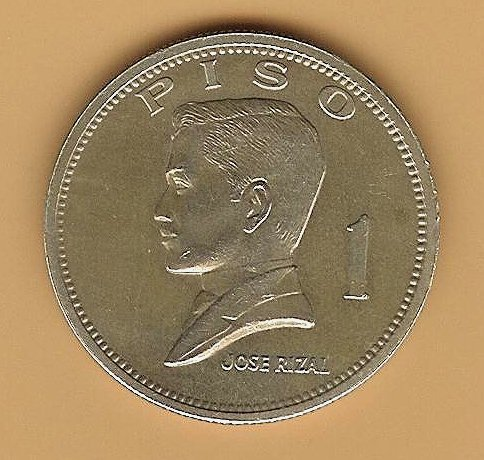
Rizal on the obverse side of a 1970 Philippine peso coin

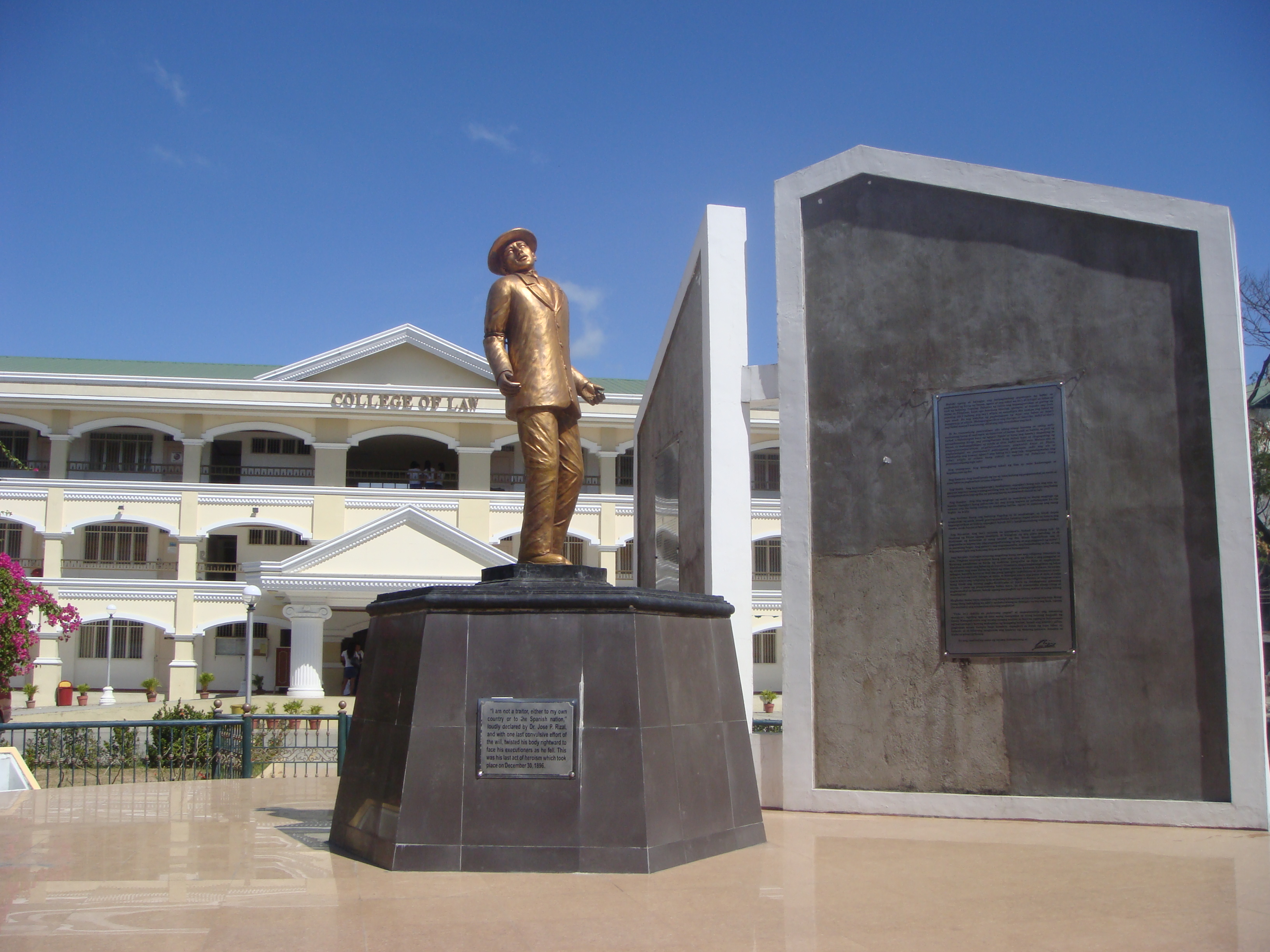
The Rizal Park at the Bulacan State University

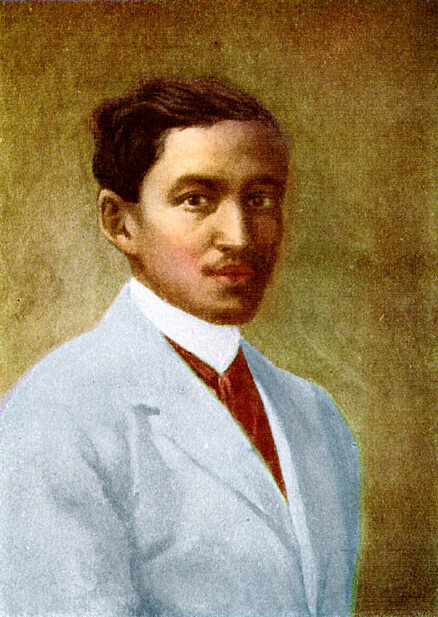
The Portrait of Rizal, painted in oil by Juan Luna

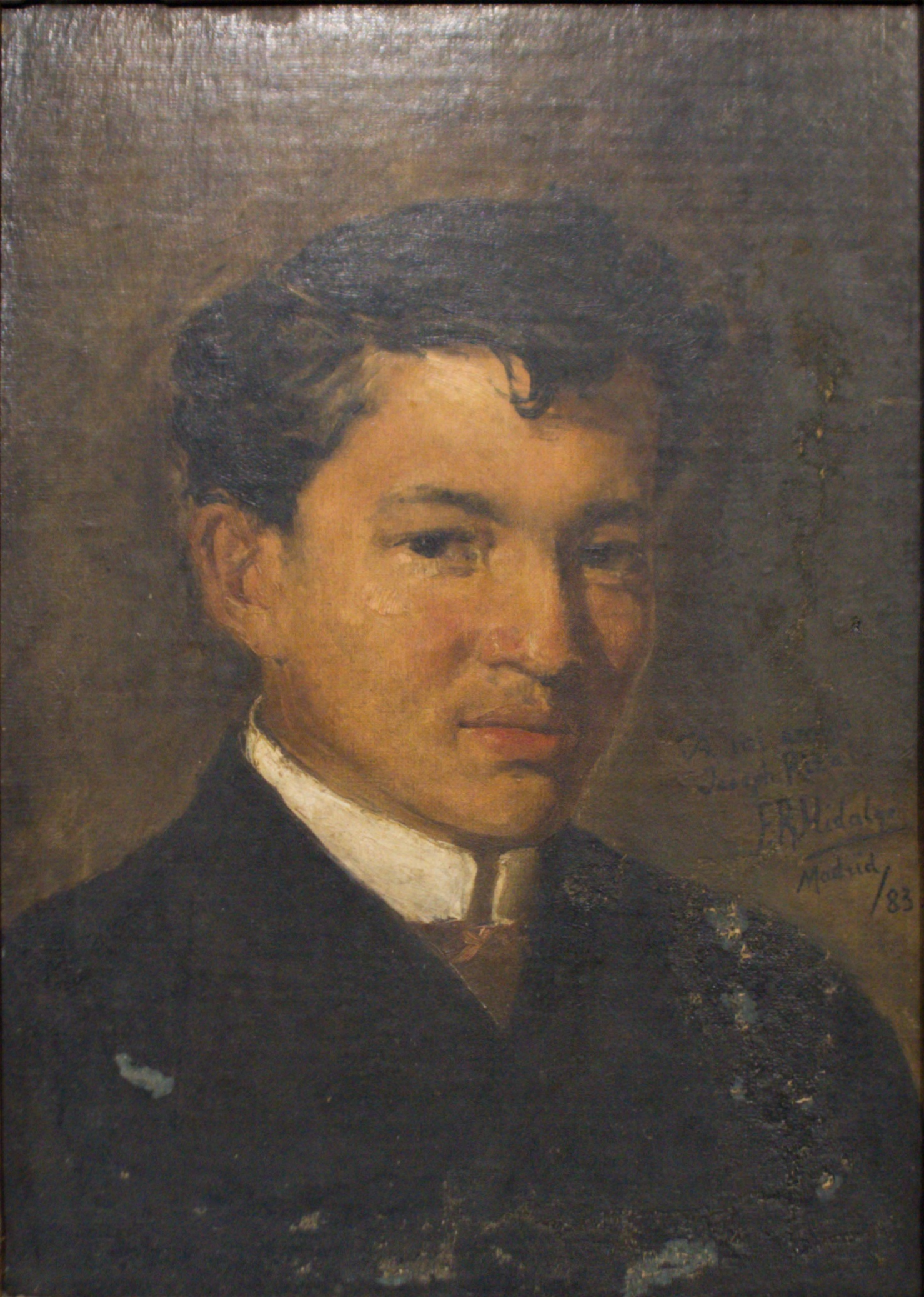
Portrait of José Rizal, painted by Félix Resurrección Hidalgo

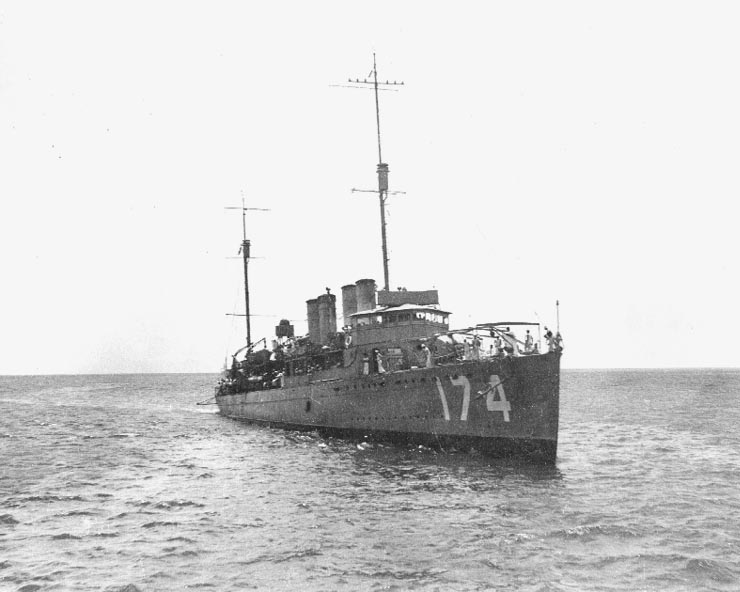
The USS Rizal (DD-174) launched in 1918

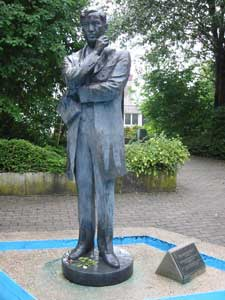
The statue of Rizal at the Rizal Park in Wilhelmsfeld, Germany

The logo used by the City of Calamba for the 150th birth anniversary of José Rizal

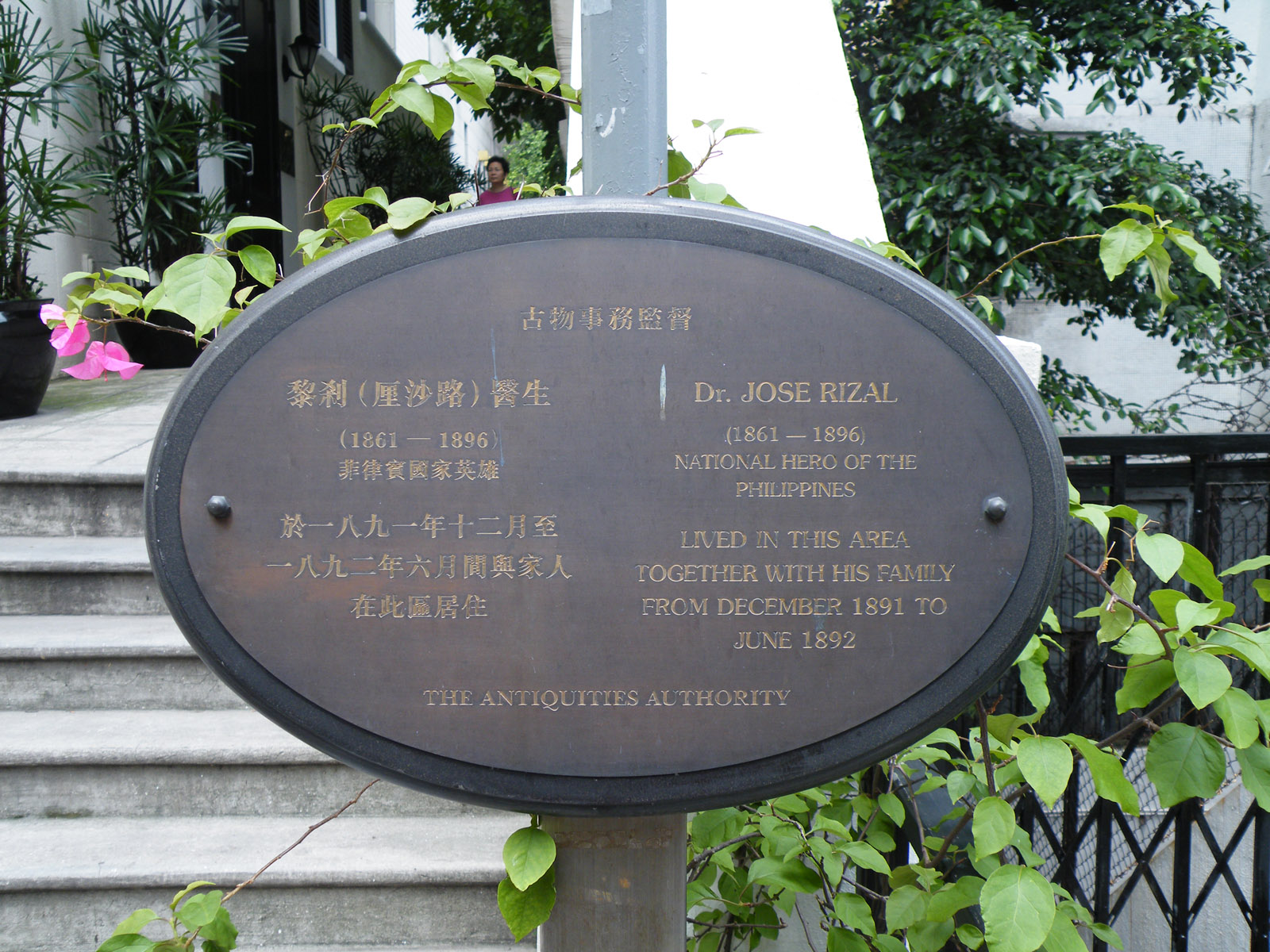
The Hong Kong Government erected a plaque beside José Rizal's residence in Hong Kong.

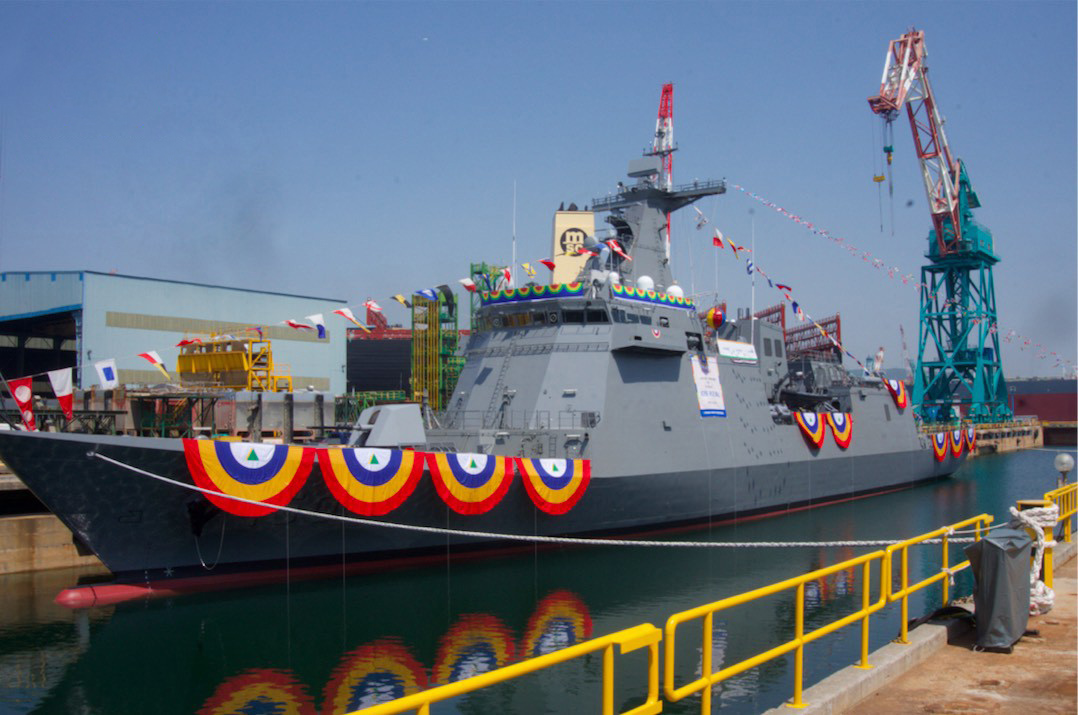
BRP Jose Rizal (FF-150) during the launching ceremony

== Rizal in popular culture ==
=== Adaptation of his works ===
The cinematic depiction of Rizal's literary works won two film industry awards more than a century after his birth. In the 10th Filipino Academy of Movie Arts and Sciences Awards ceremony, Rizal was honored in the Best Story category for Gerardo de León's adaptation of his book Noli Me Tángere. The recognition was repeated the following year with his movie version of El Filibusterismo, making him the first person to win back-to-back FAMAS Awards for writing.

Both novels were translated into opera by the composer-librettist Felipe Padilla de León: Noli Me Tángere in 1957 and El filibusterismo in 1970; and his 1939 overture, Mariang Makiling, was inspired by Rizal's tale of the same name.

Ang Luha at Lualhati ni Jeronima is a film inspired by the third chapter of Rizal's El filibusterismo.

=== Biographical films / TV series ===
- Portrayed by Honorio Lopez in the 1912 silent film La vida de José Rizal
- Portrayed by Eddie del Mar in the 1956 film Ang Buhay at Pag-ibig ni Dr. Jose Rizal.
- Portrayed by Pen Medina in two documentaries produced for the Philippine Centennial: Jose Rizal: The Pride of the Malay Rice (1995) and Rizal: Buhay ng Isang Bayani (1996)
- Portrayed by Albert Martinez in the 1997 film Rizal sa Dapitan.
- Portrayed by Dominic Guinto and Cesar Montano in the 1998 biographical film José Rizal.
- Portrayed by Eric Quizon in the ABS-CBN educational series, Bayani
- Portrayed by Joel Torre in the 1999 mockumentary film Bayaning 3rd World.
- Portrayed by Gardo Versoza in the 1999 semi-biographical film Sisa directed by Mario O'Hara
- Portrayed by Jomari Yllana in the 2007 fanstasy-comedy film Enteng Kabisote 4: Okay Ka, Fairy Ko... The Beginning of the Legend
- Portrayed by Marvin Agustin in the 2010 official "Lupang Hinirang" music video produced by GMA Network.
- Portrayed by Nasser in the 2013 TV series Katipunan
- Portrayed by Jhiz Deocareza and Alden Richards in the 2014 TV series Ilustrado.
- Portrayed by Karl Medina in the 2014 musical documentary-drama Ang Kababaihan ng Malolos by Sari and Kiri Dalena
- Portrayed by Jericho Rosales in the 2014 film Bonifacio: Ang Unang Pangulo
- Portrayed by Joem Bascon in the 2017 independent film Historiographika Errata
- Portrayed by Tony Labrusca in the 2019 iWant original series Ang Babae sa Septic Tank 3: The Untold Story of Josephine Bracken.
- Portrayed by Alexandre Lucas Martin and Khalil Ramos in the 2023 film GomBurZa.

=== Other ===
- Rizal appeared in the 1999 video game Medal of Honor as a secret character in multiplayer, alongside other historical figures such as William Shakespeare and Winston Churchill. He can be unlocked by completing the single-player mode, or through cheat codes.
- The Tekken series introduced a character by the name of Josie Rizal in acknowledgment of José Rizal.
- The turn-based strategy game Civilization VII features Rizal as a leader.

== Ancestry ==
Ancestors of José Rizal

16. Domingo Mercado
8. Francisco Mercado
17. Inez de la Rosa
4. Juan Mercado
18. Antonio Monicha
9. Bernarda Monicha
19. Ana Beatriz Vargas
2. Francisco Rizal Mercado
20. Manuel Siong-co
10. Juan Siong-co
21. Maria Guinio
5. Cirila Alejandro
11. Maria Gonio
1. José Rizal
24. Gregorio Alonso
12. Cipriano Alonso
6. Lorenzo Alberto Alonso
26. Mariano Alejandro
13. Maria Alejandro
27. Faustina Florentina
3. Teodora Alonso Realonda
28. Manuel de Quintos
14. Manuel de Quintos
29. Rosa Callianco
7. Brígida de Quintos
30. Eugenio Ursua
15. Regina Ursua
31. Benigna Ochoa

== See also ==
- José Rizal University
- José Rizal's Global Fellowship
- Makamisa
- Religious views of José Rizal
- Rizal Shrine (Manila)
- Rizal Shrine (Calamba)
- Rizal Technological University
- Rizal Without the Overcoat

== General sources ==
- Craig, Austin (1913). Lineage, Life and Labors of Jose Rizal, Philippine Patriot. World Book Co.
- Guerrero, León Ma. (1974) [1963]. The First Filipino: A Biography of José Rizal. Manila: National Historical Commission.
- Purino, Anacoreta P. (2008). Rizal, The Greatest Filipino Hero. Rex Bookstore. ISBN 9789712351280.
- Rafael, Vicente (2002). "Foreignness and Vengeance: On Rizal's "El Filibusterismo"". UCLA: Center for Southeast Asian Studies – via eScholarship.org.
- Ramos, John Ray (2018). Jose Rizal. Bayani Biographies. Saint Matthew's Publishing.
- Valdez, Maria Stella S. (2007). Doctor Jose Rizal and the Writing of His Story. Rex Bookstore, Inc. ISBN 978-971-23-4868-6.
