= Himno al Trabajo =

1888 poem by José Rizal

Himno al trabajo
- by José Rizal
- First published in: 1888

Himno al trabajo (Filipino: Dalit sa Paggawa; English: "Hymn to Labor") is a poem written by Dr. José Rizal. The poem was requested by his friends from Lipa, Batangas, in January 1888 in reaction to the Becerra Law, and to address the hardships of Lipeños (people from Lipa).

== Dedicated to Lipeños ==
The hymn was a poem praising Lipeños, who were working hard for the country. The poem is composed of conversations by men, women and children in praise of men who made a living in agriculture. The song also states that agriculture is the solution to poverty and the road to progress.
