= El Consejo de los Dioses =

Play by José Rizal

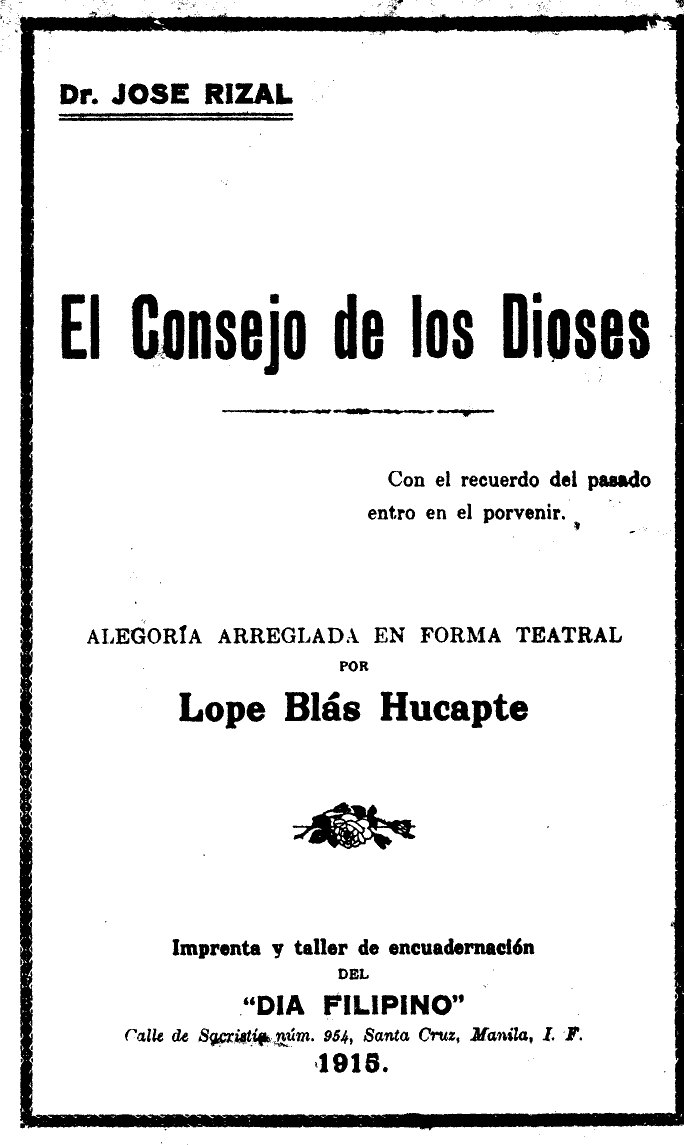
- Adaptation of the play by Lope Blas Hucapte
- Author: José Rizal
- Language: Spanish
- Genre: Play
- Publisher: Liceo Artistico Literario de Manila
- Publication date: 1880
- Publication place: Philippines
- Media type: Print

El Consejo de los Dioses (English Translation: The Council of the Gods) is a play written in Spanish by Filipino writer and national hero José Rizal, first published in 1880 in Manila by the Liceo Artistico Literario de Manila in 1880, and later by La Solidaridad in 1883.

El Consejo de los Dioses was written by Rizal when he was only nineteen years old, and reveals the humanistic education of the Philippines at the time and his answer to scholasticism.

== Summary ==
Depicting Olympian deities discussing Western literary standards, it becomes a reference text of literary criticism in the Philippines. Rizal further explores the true meaning of human desire for knowledge and designs the guidelines for a Filipino speculative thought.

== Awards ==
The play won the first prize award in an 1880-1881 literary contest commemorating the death of Cervantes sponsored by the Liceo Artistico Literario de Manila. “Con el recuerdo del pasado entro en el porvenir” (“I enter the future remembering the past”), was Rizal's epigraph for the award.

== Translation ==
In December 1900 this was translated to Tagalog. In 1961 it was edited with a prologue by Astrana Maria in El Cervantismo de heroe Filipino Rizal. Nick Joaquin translated the play in English.

== Adaptations ==
The Tagalog version was adapted into sarswela by Pascual H. Poblete and published in El Comercio de Filipinas.

Lope Blas Hucapte made arrangements for the theatrical staging in 1915.
