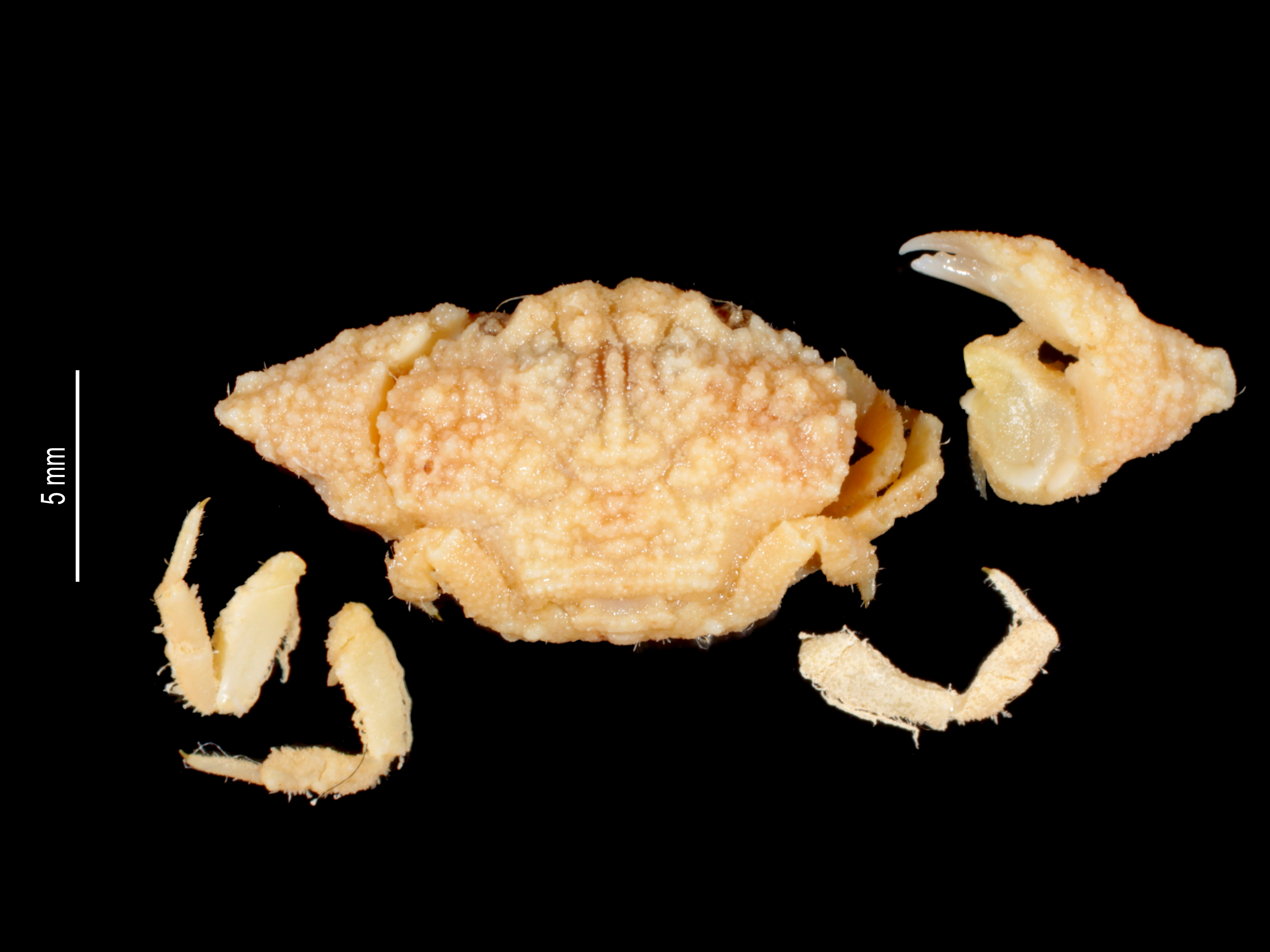

Scientific classification
- Domain: Eukaryota
- Kingdom: Animalia
- Phylum: Arthropoda
- Class: Malacostraca
- Order: Decapoda
- Suborder: Pleocyemata
- Infraorder: Brachyura
- Family: Xanthidae
- Genus: Rizalthus; Mendoza & Ng, 2008
- Species: R. anconis

Binomial name
- Rizalthus anconis Mendoza & Ng, 2008

= Rizalthus =

Genus of crabs

Rizalthus is a genus of crabs in the family Xanthidae. The only species in the genus is Rizalthus anconis.
