= List of historical markers of the Philippines in Calabarzon =

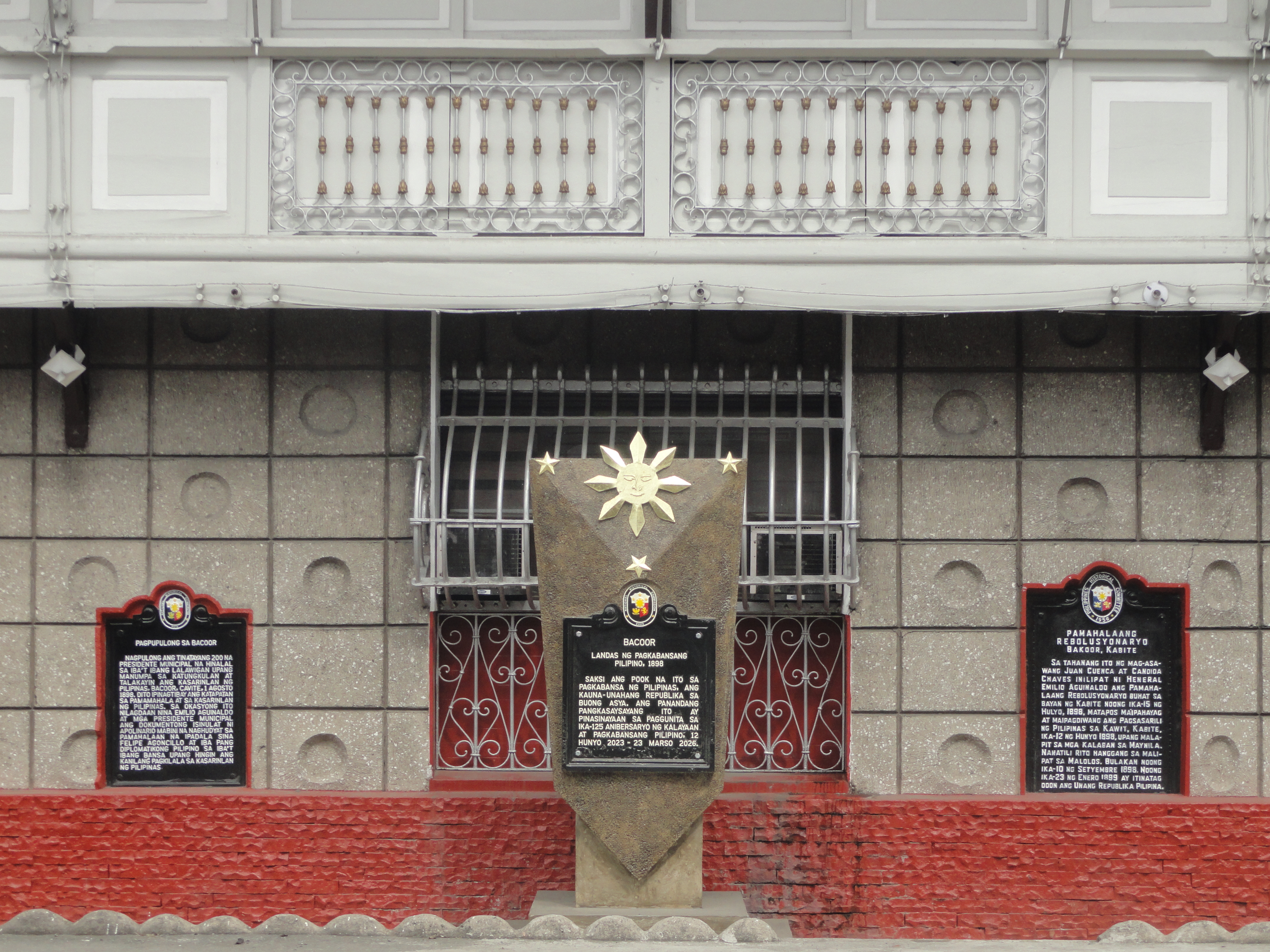
Cuenca ancestral house in Bacoor, Cavite, showing its three historical markers

This list of historical markers installed by the National Historical Commission of the Philippines (NHCP) in Calabarzon (Region IV-A) is an annotated list of people, places, or events in the region that have been commemorated by cast-iron plaques issued by the said commission. The plaques themselves are permanent signs installed in publicly visible locations on buildings, monuments, or in special locations.

While many Cultural Properties have historical markers installed, not all places marked with historical markers are designated into one of the particular categories of Cultural Properties.

In 2004, the NHCP approved a marker for the Alberto Mansion, Biñan for its historicity in relation to Teodora Alonso, José Rizal, and the city. However, the marker did not push through because the owner refused to follow preservation requests.

On March 18, 2015, a marker pertaining to the Jabidah massacre was installed in Corregidor, Cavite City. Despite referring to the said event, the marker was entitled "Mindanao Garden of Peace, Corregidor Island" and did not contain the name "Jabidah."

A marker commemorating National Artist Vicente Manansala was moved from his house in Binangonan to Holy Angel University in Angeles City.

This article lists 294 markers from the CALABARZON Region, including two that are part of the Philippine Nationhood Trail markers series.

== Batangas ==
This table lists 46 markers from the province of Batangas.

Marker title	Description	Location	Language	Date issued	Image
Albino C. Dimayuga	Journalist, poet, and nationalist writer. Translated Mi último adiós into Tagalog.	115 10 de Julio St., Lipa	Filipino	September 14, 1984	
Ananias Diokno	Known as the "General of the Ocean," he fought Spaniards in Panay.	Ananias Diokno Ancestral House, Taal	Filipino	January 22, 1991	
Dito Ipinanganak Ika-23 ng Hulyo, 1864; Apolinario Mabini (Note: Here Was Born 23 July 1864 Apolinario Mabini)	Memorial site to the "Sublime Paralytic" of the Philippine revolution.	Tanauan	Filipino, English	1939, 1952, 1964	
Arsobispado ng Lipa (Note: Archbishopric of Lipa)	First evangelization activities in Batangas by 1572. Became an archdiocese on June 20, 1972.	Lipa Cathedral, Lipa	Filipino	2011	
Bahay ni Apacible (Note: House of Apacible)	Designated as a heritage house by the NHCP.	Apacible Ancestral House, Taal	Filipino	October 25, 1977	
Basilika Menor ng Inmaculada Concepcion (Note: Minor Basilica of the Immaculate Conception)	First church built by Diego Mojica, in 1581. Second church was built in 1601.	Basilica Menor of the Immaculate Concepcion Church façade, Batangas City	Filipino	January 15, 1984	
Ang Basilika ng Taal (Note: The Basilica of Taal)	Built in 1575 by Father Diego Espina, known as the largest Catholic church in the East.	Taal Basilica, Taal	Filipino	December 8, 1986	
Battle of Talisay				October 12, 1997	
Bayan ng San Juan (San Juan de Bocboc) (Note: Town of San Juan (San Juan de Bocboc))	Original center was in Pinagbayanan. Moved to current site because of the request of the citizens due to frequent floods.	Old Municipal Hall Building, San Juan	Filipino	December 12, 1990	
Ang Bayan ng Taal (1572) (Note: The Town of Taal (1572))	Moved from its original site in Balangon because of the eruptions of the Taal Volcano.	Taal Municipal Hall, Taal	Filipino	December 8, 1972	
Birthplace of Apolinario Mabini	Born in Barrio Talaga on July 23, 1864.	Tanauan	English	1939	
Cathedral of Lipa	Administered by the Augustinians from 1605 to the end of the nineteenth century.	Lipa Cathedral, Lipa	English	1939	
Church of Bauan	Administered by the Augustinians from 1596 to the end of the nineteenth century.	Bauan Church façade, Bauan	English	1939	
Church of Ibaan	Became a town in 1804. First church was built in 1817. Present church was built in 1869.	Ibaan Church façade, Ibaan	English	1941	
Church of San Jose	Church built by the famous botanist Rev. Manuel Blanco, O.S.A. in 1812.	San Jose	English	1939	
Clemencia Castelo Lopez (1872–1963)	Went to the United States as member of the Anti-Imperialist League. She gave testimony at the United States Senate on March 15, 1902, to oppose the American occupation of the Philippines.	Balayan	Filipino	February 8, 2013	
Escuela Pia	School entrusted to the Order of Escuela Pia, a religious congregation established by San Jose de Calasanz.	Escuela Pia, Taal	Filipino	January 22, 1991	
Felipe Agoncillo y Encarnacion; 1859–1941	Lawyer, statesman, and patriot. First Filipino diplomat. Born on May 26, 1859.	Agoncillo Ancestral House, Taal	Filipino	1955	
Fidel A. Reyes	Exposed American corruption during the American occupation in his editorial "Aves de Rapiña."	P. Torres cor. G. Solis St., Lipa	Filipino	May 3, 1984	
Galicano C. Apacible (1864–1949)	A propagandist who became governor of Batangas. Born on June 24, 1864.	Balayan	Filipino	June 24, 2003	
Gliceria Marella de Villavicencio (1852–1929)	Heroine, provided moral and material help in the revolution. Her house became a major station for soldiers of the Philippine Revolution.	Villavicencio Ancestral House, Taal	Filipino	December 8, 1985	
Goco Ancestral House	Declared as a heritage house by the NHCP.	Goco Ancestral House, Taal	English	March 3, 2001	
Heneral Nicolas Gonzales at Lantin (Note: General Nicolas Gonzales y Lantin)	Filipino revolutionary and general. Governor of Batangas from 1916 to 1919	Tanauan	Filipino	December 5, 1958	
José P. Laurel	Former president of the Philippines.	Tanauan	Filipino	March 9, 1964	
Jose P. Laurel	Jurist, statesman, and legislator. Former president of the Philippines.	Tanauan	Filipino	March 9, 1991	
Jose Rizal (1861–1896)	Philippine national hero. Doctor, surveyor, linguist, writer, poet.	Tuy	Rizal Monument, Tuy Plaza	December 28, 2021	
Lauro Dimayuga	Revolutionary and one of the original members of Indios Bravos by José Rizal	In front of Lipa City hall, Lipa	Filipino	January 25, 1991	
Leon Apacible (1865–1911)	Revolutionary who became the right-hand man of Miguel Malvar. Present house became a meeting place for Rizal and other heroes.	Apacible Ancestral House, Taal	Filipino	October 25, 1980	
Luz-Katigbak Ancestral House	Declared as a heritage house by the NHCP.	198 Rizal Street, Lipa	English	October 20, 1996	
Marcela Mariño Agoncillo; 1859–1946	One of the women who sewed the first flag of the Philippines. Spouse of Felipe Agoncillo.	Agoncillo Ancestral House, Taal	Filipino	June 24, 1955	
Miguel Malvar (1865–1911)	Born in the village of San Miguel, last Filipino general to surrender to the Americans.	Sto. Tomas	Filipino	September 27, 1973	
Dito Isinilang Noong Ika-27& ng Setyembre 1865; Miguel Malvar (Note: Here Was Born 27 September 1865 Miguel Malvar)	Became the highest leader of the Revolution, 1901.		Filipino		
Municipality of Lemery	Town established in 1862 during the administration of governor-general Jose Lemery.	Lemery	English	1962	
Pagdaong sa Nasugbu (Note: Nasugbu Landing)	Where the American soldiers landed during WWII. The Filipino guerrillas were headed by Lieutenant Colonel Marcelo Castillo and Colonel Eleuterio L. Adevoso.	Nasugbu	Filipino	2007	
Paliparang Batangan, P.A.A.C. (Note: Batangas Airfield, P.A.A.C.)	Main headquarters of the 6th Pursuit Squadron. On December 12, 1941, six Filipino-crewed aircraft were launched against the Japanese.	Batangas City	Filipino	May 1, 1968	
Parola ng Cape Santiago (Note: Cape Santiago Lighthouse)	First surveyed and suggested by Martin Pers y Pers in 1887. Constructed in 1890. Served as a guide for ships for the Port of Manila.	Cape Santiago, Calatagan	Filipino	March 12, 2018	
Parola ng Malabrigo (Note: Malabrigo Lighthouse)	Designed by Guillermo Brockman as a cylindrical brick tower with metal staircase.	Lobo	Filipino, English	2007	
Pinagtayuan ng Unang Simbahan ng Bauan (Note: Site of the First Church of Bauan)	First established by the Augustinians on March 17, 1590. Relocated because of frequent floods.	Santa Teresita (currently within NHCP storage)	Filipino	May 17, 2000	
Santuario ng Nuestra Señora de Caysasay (Note: Sanctuary of Our Lady of Caysasay)	Constructed to enshrine the image of Our Lady of Caysasay, which was caught in the Pansipit River in 1603.	Taal	Filipino	June 20, 2024	
Simbahan ng Balayan (Note: Church of Balayan)	First built by Franciscans out of light materials in 1579. Stone church built in 1749.	Balayan Catholic Church façade, Balayan	Filipino	December 8, 1986	
Simbahan ng San Juan (Note: Church of San Juan)	First built out of palm and bamboo in Pinagbayanan, 1843.	San Juan	Filipino	January 19, 1990	
Ang Simbahan ng Taal (Note: The Church of Taal)	Moved from its original site in Balangon because of the eruptions of the Taal Volcano.	Taal Basilica, Taal (currently within NHCP storage)	Filipino	December 8, 1972	
Simbahan ng Tanauan (Note: Church of Tanauan)	First built by Augustinians out of wood. Construction completed before 1590.	Tanauan	Filipino	January 21, 1991	
Sixto Castelo Lopez (1863–1947)	Born on April 6, 1863. One of the few Filipinos who did not pledge allegiance to both Spain and the United States.	Sixto Lopez Ancestral House, Balayan	Filipino	March 13, 1993	
Teodoro M. Kalaw	Famous historian. Editor from El Renacimiento. Director of the National Library from 1916 to 1917.	Lipa	Filipino	1959	
Ylagan-de La Rosa Ancestral House	Declared as a heritage house by the NHCP.	Ylagan-de La Rosa Ancestral House, Taal	English	May 30, 1999	

== Cavite ==
This table lists 109 markers from the province of Cavite.

Marker title	Description	Location	Language	Date issued	Image
Arsenal ng Imus (Note: Arsenal of Imus)	Became a military factory of the Katipuneros during the Revolutionary War and the Philippine–American War.	Cavite Provincial Police Office, Camp Gen. Pantaleon Garcia, Imus	Filipino	April 19, 1999	
Artemio Ricarte (Vibora) (Note: Artemio Ricarte (Viper))	Became the residence of Artemio Ricarte from 1890 to 1900.	General Trias	Filipino	July 13, 1974	
The Astronomical Observatory of Cavite	Formerly occupied by the Castellano by the Spaniards and the Commandant of the Cavite Navy Yard under the American regime.	Cavite City	English		
Astronomical Observatory of Joseph Le Paute D'Aglet	French Astronomer Joseph Le Paute D'Aglet determined the latitude of Cavite in 1787.	Cavite City	English	1998	
Bacoor; Landas ng Pagkabansang Pilipino, 1898 (Note: Bacoor: Philippine Nationhood Trail, 1898)	Bacoor is a witness to Filipino Nationhood, site of the first republic.	Cuenca Ancestral House, Calle Evangelista, Bacoor	Filipino	August 1, 2023	
Bahay na Pinaglitisan kay Andres Bonifacio (Note: House Where Bonifacio was Court-Martialled)	House where Bonifacio and his brother Procopio were put on trial.	Maragondon	Filipino	November 30, 2000	
Bahay na Tinigilan ni Bonifacio (Note: House Where Bonifacio Stayed)	House where Bonifactio and his brothers Procopio and Ciriaco stayed.	Virata House, General Trias	Filipino	2009	
Ang Bahay ng mga Tirona (Note: The House of the Tironas)	Served as a primary school between 1880 and 1896. Became a hospital during the Philippine Revolution.	Tirona House, Imus	Filipino	November 20, 1975	
Ang Bahay ni Aguinaldo; 1849 (Note: The House of Aguinaldo: 1849)	Emilio Aguinaldo was born here and became the site of the proclamation of Philippine Independence.	Aguinalo Shrine, Kawit	Filipino	March 22, 1972	
Ang Bahay ni Heneral Baldomero Aguinaldo (Note: The House of General Baldomero Aguinaldo)	House of Emilio Aguinaldo's first cousin and a cabinet member of the revolutionary government.	Binakayan, Kawit	Filipino	June 12, 1983	
Baldomero Aguinaldo y Baloy	One of the signers of the Pact of Biak-na-Bato.		English		
Battle of Alapan	The Filipino flag was hoisted here for the first time.	Imus	English	1950	
Battle of Alapan	The Filipino flag was waved here for the first time during the battle.	Barrio Alapan, Imus	Filipino, English	May 28, 1998	
Bayan ng Amadeo (Note: Town of Amadeo)	Formerly a barrio of Silang. Named after King Amadeo I of Spain.	Amadeo	Filipino	December 20, 1992	
Bridge of Isabel II	Bridge constructed shortly before 1857. The builder was awarded as silver medalist.	Liko Street, Imus	English	1939	
Bundok Nagpatong; Maragondon, Cavite (Note: Mount Nagpatong: Maragondon, Cavite)	Site where Andres Bonifacio and his brother Procopio were executed in accordance to the military court of the revolutionary government.	Maragondon	Filipino	1963; November 30, 1979	
Casa Hacienda de Naic (Note: Hacienda House of Naic)	Where Bonifacio formed the Naic Military Agreement, contrary to the agreements set by the Tejeros Convention.	Naic	Filipino	April 27, 1998	
Cavite National High School	Established in 1902. The foundation stone was put within the current site on November 21, 1930.	Cavite City	Filipino	June 19, 2002	
Cavite Puerto Bilang Kabesera ng Pilipinas (Note: Cavite Port as the Capital of the Philippines)	Aguinaldo used the house of Maximo Inocencio as the headquarters of the dictatorial government.	Samonte Park, Cavite City	Filipino	August 31, 2023	
Corregidor	Became a stronghold for multiple political entities, including the Chinese in 1225, Spanish, Dutch, Allied forces and the Japanese.	Corregidor, Cavite City	English	1949	
Diego Mojica	Poet and leader of the revolutionaries. Known by the name "Katibayan."	General Trias	Filipino	March 17, 1990	
Dito sa Kawit, Cavite, Isinilang Noong Ika-29 ng Agosto 1862 si Heneral Candido Tria Tirona (Note: Here in Kawit, Cavite, General Candido Tria Tirona Was Born on 29 August 1862)	Site of the birth of the general who helped propagate Katipunan ideas in Cavite.	Kaligtasan St., Kawit	Filipino	August 29, 1956	
Dito sa Indang, Kabite Isinilang Noong Ika-8 ng Enero, 1851 si Severino de las Alas (Note: Here in Indang, Cavite, Severino de las Alas Was Born on 8 January 8 1851)	Birthplace of the revolutionary and politician. Headed the Convention of Imus in 1896 and the Convention of Tejeros in 1897.	Indang	Filipino	January 8, 1958	
Dito sa Naik, Kabite Isinilang, 17 Mayo, 1875 si Pascual H. Poblete (Note: Here in Naic, Cavite, Pascual Poblete Was Born on 17 May 1875)	Distinguished newspaperman during the Spanish and American regimes.	Naic	Filipino	1951	
Edilberto Evangelista (1862-1897)	General who built trenches that lead to the victories of the Battles of Binakayan and Dalahican.	Zapote Battlefield, Bacoor	Filipino	June 23, 2026	
Emiliano Riego de Dios	Became a Katipunero and a military governor of Cavite. Became the second chairman of the Hongkong junta in November 1898.	Maragondon	Filipino	March 22, 1975	
Emilio Aguinaldo y Famy (1869–1964)	The first president of the Republic of the Philippines, from 1899 to 1901.	Emilio Aguinaldo Shrine, Kawit	English	June 11, 1998	
Emilio Aguinaldo y Famy (1869–1964)	The first President of the Republic of the Philippines, from 1899 to 1901.	Casa Hacienda de Tejeros, Rosario	Filipino	2011	
Emilio Aguinaldo y Famy (1869–1964)	The first president of the Republic of the Philippines, from 1899 to 1901.	Emilio Aguinaldo Monument, Real Street, General Emilio Aguinaldo (Bailen)	Filipino	June 22, 2021	
Enrique T. Virata	One of the founders of Family Planning Association of the Philippines.	172 Medicion II, Imus	Filipino, English	July 14, 1984	
Ermita de Porta Vaga	First built as a chapel for the Nuestra Señora de la Soledad de Porta Vaga in 1667.	Plaza Soledad, Cavite City	Filipinas	November 17, 1991	
Espiritu Santo Hospital	Site of the hospital founded by Franciscans in 1591. Demolished in 1662 as a military precaution against the attack of Kue-sing.	Bacoor	English		
Felipe Calderon	Pedagogue, lawyer, writer. Drafted the constitution of the First Philippine Republic.	Tanza	English		
Felipe G. Calderon	Pedagogue, lawyer, scholar, and patriot. Drafted the Constitution of the First Philippine Republic.	Tanza	Filipino	April 4, 1957	
Flaviano Yengko	General of the revolution. Where his remains were interred.	Imus	Filipino	December 22, 1974	
Francisca Tirona Benitez	First teacher on home economics of the Philippine Normal School. First president of the Philippine Women's University.	Imus Pilot Elementary School, Home Economics Building, Imus, Cavite, Imus	Filipino	June 4, 1982	
General Licerio Topacio y Cuenca (1839–1925)	Nationalist and revolutionary. Planned and built the fortification at the Zapote Bridge.	F. Tirona St., Poblacion, Imus	Filipino	November 16, 1991	
General Mariano Trias	Patriot, soldier, statesman. Headed the revolutionary movement of San Francisco de Malabon.	General Trias	Filipino	March 10, 1979	
General Mariano Trias	Became the Vice President under the Revolutionary Government.	General Mariano Trias Civic Center, General Trias	Filipino	February 24, 2020	
General Trias	Historic town originally named San Francisco de Malabon and the town's band became the first who played the national anthem on Independence Day on June 12, 1898, in Kawit, Cavite.	General Trias	Filipino	March 17, 1990	
Hen. Baldomero Aguinaldo y Baloy (1869–1915)	Emilio Aguinaldo's first cousin and a cabinet member of the revolutionary government.	Baldomero Aguinaldo Shrine, Binakayan, Kawit	Filipino	June 12, 1983	
Heneral Jose Ignacio Paua (Note: General Jose Ignacio Paua)	Born in Fookien. The only Chinese who signed the Constitution of Biak-na-Bato.	Emilio Aguinaldo Shrine, Kawit	Filipino	June 12, 1989	
Heneral Jose Ignacio Paua (Note: General Jose Ignacio Paua)	Born in Fookien. The only Chinese who signed the Constitution of Biak-na-Bato.	Silang	Filipino	1991	
Heneral Nicolas Gonzales at Lantin (Note: General Nicolas Gonzales y Lantin)	Filipino revolutionary and general. Born on December 5, 1859.	People's Park in the Sky, Tagaytay	Filipino	January 17, 2003	
Heneral Trias (Note: General Trias)	Town established in 1720, formerly San Francisco de Malabon.	General Trias	Filipino	1979	
Here in the City of Cavite Was Born on 28 January 1861 Julián Felipe	Birthplace of the composer of the Philippine National Anthem. Born on January 28, 1861.	Julian Felipe Monument, Cavite City	English	1955	
Here was Born 12 October 1869 General Mariano Trias	Birthplace of the one who led the revolutionary movement in San Francisco de Malabon.	General Mariano Trias (San Francisco de Malabon)	English	October 12, 1953	
House Where Andres Bonifacio Lived	Presidents Aquinaldo, Quezon, Osmeña, Roxas, and Quirino were also guests of this house.	General Trias	English	1961	
Imus	Town former part of the Hacienda de Imus by the Recollects. Became a municipality in 1795.	Imus Town Plaza, Imus	English	1954	
Ika-41 Dibisyon Hukbong Katihan ng Pilipinas (USAFFE); 1 Setyembre – 25 Disyembre 1941 (Note: 41st Division Philippine Army (USAFFE): 1 September – 25 December 1941)	Meeting site of the 41st Division of the Philippine Army (USAFFE) through Brig. Gen. Vicente P. Lim in August 1941 under the military commands of Franklin Roosevelt and Manuel Quezon.	Tagaytay	Filipino	April 27, 1979	
Jose Tagle	Colonel of the revolutionary forces and the hero of the Battle of Imus of 1896.	Bayan Luma III, Imus	Filipino	2008	
Juan Cailles (1871–1951)	Revolutionary during both the wars against the Spaniards and the Americans.	Amaya, Tanza	Filipino	January 26, 1988	
Julian R. Felipe	Composed the national anthem. Was arrested along the Thirteen Martyrs of Cavite.	Julian R. Felipe Elementary School, Cavite City	Filipino	August 30, 1990	
Ang Kapulungan sa Tejeros (Note: The Tejeros Convention)	Revolutionary convention held at Tejeros. Emilio Aguinaldo was elected president.	Tejeros Convention Site, Rosario	Filipino	1958	
Ang Pagwawagayway ng Watawat ng Pilipinas sa Lungsod ng Cavite (Note: The Waving of the Philippine Flag in the City of Cavite)	Site of the Teatro Caviteño, main headquarters of Aguinalfo, where the flag was first flown on May 28, 1898.	Cavite City	Filipino	May 28, 2000	
Katedral ng Imus (Note: Cathedral of Imus)	Built as a parochial church by Recollect priests in 1575 under the patronage of Nuestra Señora del Pilar and San Juan Bautista.	Imus	Filipino	November 13, 2006	
Kawit; Landas ng Pagkabansang Pilipino, 1898 (Note: Kawit: Philippine Nationhood Trail, 1898)	Kawit is a witness to Filipino Nationhood, site of the first republic.	Aguinaldo Shrine, Kawit	Filipino	August 31, 2023	
Kuta ng San Felipe Neri (Note: San Felipe Neri Fort)	First fort built in the port of Cavite between 1609 and 1616.	Cavite Naval Base, Cavite City	Filipino	February 10, 1978	
Labanan sa Alapan (Note: Battle of Alapan)	Successful battle where the flag of the Philippines was also first raised	Alapan	Filipino	May 28, 1970	
Labanan sa Binakayan (Note: Battle of Binakayan)	One of the bloodiest battles in Cavite. Gen. Candido Tria Tirona was killed, among many others. The battle was a Filipino victory.	Pulvorista, Binakayan, Kawit	Filipino	November 11, 1996	
Labanan sa Imus (Note: Battle of Imus)	Filipino victory became an inspiration for the revolutionary forces to fight for freedom.	Cuartel of Imus, Imus	Filipino	September 3, 2006	
Labanan sa Kalero; Nobeleta, Kabite (Note: Battle of Kalero: Noveleta, Cavite)	More than 400 troops of the forces of the Spanish General Diego de Dios were killed here.	Noveleta	Filipino	August 31, 1994	
Laban sa Pasong Santol (Note: Batlle of Santol Pass)	Where Crispulo Aguinaldo, the elder brother of Emilio Aguinaldo, died from this battle.	Santol Pass, Santiago Subdivision, Imus	Filipino	March 24, 1971	
Ladislao Diwa	Member of La Liga Filipina and a founder of the Katipunan	Cavite City	Filipino	June 27, 1954	
Ladislao Diwa Elementary School	In the memory of Ladislao Diwa. Monument was built on November 30, 1964.	Ladislao Diwa Elementary School, Cavite City	English	November 30, 1964	
Labintatlong Martir ng Cavite (Note: Thirteen Martyrs of Cavite)	Thirteen who were martyred after being accused of collaborating with the Katipuneros on the revolt on August 31, 1896.	General Trias	Filipino	June 5, 1997	
Liberators Guerilla	Established by Patrocinio Z. Gulapa as an anti-Japanese league during World War II	Maragondon Town Plaza, Maragondon	Filipino	October 26, 2017	
Ang Lungsod ng Tagaytay (Note: The City of Tagaytay)	Famous tourist spot which was designated as the second Summer Capital of the Philippines.	Tagaytay	Filipino	August 19, 1978	
Mababang Paaralang Manuel S. Rojas (Note: Manuel S. Rojas Elementary School)	Named after the father of Commonwealth Act 547. Built in the Gabaldon style.	Cavite City	Filipino	October 11, 1991	
Mariano M. Alvarez (1842–1924)	Revolutionary military leader, born in Noveleta and adopted the nom-de-guerre "Mainam". After the war participated in local politics of Noveleta. The town of General Mariano Alvarez was renamed after him in 1980.	Town Hall, General Mariano Alvarez	Filipino	September 2, 2026	
Mariano Reguera Noriel (1864–1915)	Revolutionary general, tasked by Aguinaldo to head the council that will put Bonifacio into trial.	IFI Cathedral of St. Michael, Bacoor City	Filipino	January 27, 2026	
Mariano Riego De Dios; 1875–1935	Revolutionary who fought against the Spaniards and the Americans.	Maragondon Plaza, Maragondon	Filipino	April 24, 2023	
Memorare	Dedicated to the delegates of the Tejeros Convention. Centennial dedication.	Tejeros Convention Site, Rosario	English	March 22, 1997	
Mindanao Garden of Peace; Corregidor Island	Commemorates the events leading to the Jabidah Massacre of 1968 and the resulting national crisis of the 1970s.	Corregidor, Cavite City	Filipino	March 18, 2015	
Navy Hospital of Cañacao	Started functioning in 1875. Sisters of Charity took charge in July 1876.	Caridad, Cavite City	English		
Organization of the Revolutionary Government	In the convent of the Church of Tanza was the place where Emilio Aguinaldo and Mariano Trias took oaths as President and Vice President of the revolutionary government.	Tanza	English	1940; May 3, 1980	
Padre Mariano Gomes (Note: Father Mariano Gomes)	Was tried on grounds of sedition, along with Fathers Burgos and Zamora.	St. Michael the Archangel Parish Patio, Barangay Tabing Dagat (Poblacion), Bacoor	Filipino	August 2, 2021	
Padre Mariano Gomez (Note: Father Mariano Gómez)	One third of the GOMBURZA. Became the parish priest of Bacoor for 48 years.	Bacoor	Filipino	August 5, 1972 (replaced by the 2021 marker)	
Padre Modesto de Castro (1819–1864) (Note: Father Modesto de Castro (1819–1864))	Author of Urbana and Felisa. Father of Tagalog prose. Born on June 15, 1819.	Naic	Filipino	January 21, 2014	
Ang Pag-aaklas sa Kabite ng 1872 (Note: The Cavite Mutiny of 1872)	The revolt against unjust taxes and forced labor which resulted on the execution of GOMBURZA priests.	Plaza Soledad, Cavite City	Filipino	June 12, 1972	
Ang Pagdakip kay Bonifacio (Note: The Capture of Bonifacio)	Where Andrés Bonifacio was captured in orders under Aguinaldo. In this encounter, Ciriaco Bonifacio died.	Limbon, Indang	Filipino	1963	
Pagpupulong sa Bacoor (Note: Bacoor Assembly)	On August 1, 1898, elected municipal heads swore and discussed Philippine independence.	Cuenca Ancestral House, Calle Evangelista, Bacoor (original location: Fr. Mariano Gomez Plaza)	Filipino	August 2, 2018	
Pamahalaang Bayan ng Kawit (1896) (Note: Municipal Government of Kawit (1896))	Site of the town hall which was invaded by the forces of Aguinaldo and Tirona.	Kawit Municipal Hall, Kawit	Filipino	August 31, 1973	
Pamahalaang Rebolusyonaryo; Bakoor, Kabite (Note: Revolutionary Government: Bacoor, Cavite)	House where the revolutionary government was moved after Kawit and before Malolos	Cuenca Ancestral House, Calle Evangelista, Bacoor	Filipino	1956	
Panunumpa ni Hen. Emilio Aguinaldo (1897) (Note: Oath-taking of Gen. Emilio Aguinaldo (1897))	Inauguration for the Revolutionary Government of the Philippines on March 23, 1987.	Tanza	Filipino	October 31, 1973	
Ang Parokya ng Santa Cruz; Tanza, Cavite (Note: The Parish of Santa Cruz: Tanza, Cavite)	Established as an independent parish on August 29, 1780. Formerly a part of San Francisco de Malabon.	Tanza	Filipino	May 3, 1980	
Parokya ni Sta. Maria Magdalena (Note: Parish of Saint Mary Magdalene)	Separated from the town of Silang on May 1, 1884. Stone church built by P. Agapito Ichogoyen in 1889.	Catholic Plaza, Amadeo	Filipino	July 26, 1984	
Pilar Lodge Blg. 15 F&AM (Note: Pilar Lodge No. 15 F&AM)	Masonic lodge established on June 5, 1894; its most famous member is Emilio Aguinaldo.	Imus	Filipino	June 18, 1994	
Plaza Olivia Salamanca	In memory of Olivia Salamanca, M.D,. pioneer woman physician of the Philippines.	Imus	Filipino	December 17, 1973	
Plaza Olivia Salamanca	In memory of Olivia Salamanca, M.D,. pioneer woman physician of the Philippines.	San Roque	English	1955	
Pook na Pinagkulungan kay Andres Bonifacio (Note: Site Where Andres Bonifacio was Detained)	Where Andrés Bonifacio, together with his wife Gregoria de Jesus and his brother Procopio were jailed	Indang	Filipino	November 30, 2000	
Site of the Proclamation of Philippine Independence	Site of the proclamation of Philippine Independence on June 12, 1898.	Emilio Aguinaldo Shrine, Kawit	Filipino, English	1971	
San Ezekiel Moreno (1848–1906) (Note: Saint Ezequiel Moreno (1848–1906))	Spanish priest who administered in Bacoor and Las Piñas.	Bacoor	Filipino	December 1, 2017	
Severino de las Alas	Patriot and philanthropist. Interior secretary during the First Philippine Republic.	Indang	Filipino	1958	
Simbahan ng Bacoor (Note: Church of Bacoor)	Started as a visita of Cavite Puerto, one of the first churches in cavite to be administered by Secular priests.	Bacoor	Filipino	March 2, 2022	
Simbahan ng Dasmariñas (Note: Church of Dasmariñas)	Site of the bloody battle between the Spaniards and the Filipinos under Placido Campos and Francisco Barzaga on February 25, 1897;	Dasmariñas	Filipino	October 2, 1986	
Simbahan ng Heneral Trias (Note: Church of General Trias)	Where the Marcha Filipina was practiced before it was played during Independence.	General Trias	Filipino	December 12, 1992	
Simbahan ng Kawit (Note: Church of Kawit)	First administered by Jesuit priests. First wooden church built in 1638.	St. Mary Magdalene Parish Church plaza, Kawit	Filipino	July 21, 1990	
Ang Simbahan ng Maragondon (Note: The Church of Maragondon)	Built by the Jesuits, 1618. Became a parish church in 1627.	Maragondon	Filipino	2007	
Simbahan ng Silang (Note: Church of Silang)	Established as a parish by the Franciscans on February 3, 1595. Katipunero forces took over this church under Vito Belarmino.	Silang Church, Silang	Filipino	2008	
Tagaytay Ridge Landing	Site of the first parachute landing in the Philippines on February 3, 1945.	Tagaytay	English	1951	
The Tejeros Convention	The famous revolutionary assembly held on March 22, 1897.	Barrio Tejeros, San Francisco de Malabon (now General Trias)	English	1941	
The Tejeros Convention	Where the revolutionary assembly was held. Emilio Aguinaldo was elected president.	Rosario	English	1973	
Tribunal ng Nobeleta; Kabite (Note: Tribunal of Noveleta: Cavite)	Where General Pascual Álvarez was killed, which sparked the revolution in Cavite.	Noveleta	Filipino	August 31, 1964	
Tulay Tomas Mascardo (Note: Tomas Mascardo Bridge)	Named after Tomás Mascardo, former governor of Cavite from 1910 to 1912	Imus	Filipino	December 17, 1973	
Union Theological Seminary	Oldest Protestant seminary in the Philippines. Was a merger of Presbyterian and Methodists schools.	Dasmariñas	Filipino	2007	
Vito Belarmino	Revolutionary, one of the leaders who led the uprising in Silang	Plaza Makabayan, Silang, Cavite	Filipino	September 7, 2016	
Where Bonifacio was Court-Martialled	House where Bonifactio and his brother Procopio were put into trial.	Maragondon	Filipino, English	1948, 1963	
Zapote Battlefield	Where Filipinos fought against the Spaniards and the Americans in two battles, one in 1897 and one in 1899.	Zapote Road	English	1952	

== Laguna ==
This table lists 66 markers from the province of Laguna.

Marker title	Description	Location	Language	Date issued	Image
Ambrosio Rianzares Bautista (1830–1903)	Author of the Acta de la proclamación de independencia del pueblo Filipino.	Ambrosio Rianzares Bautista Hall, Sentrong Pangkultura ng Biñan (Biñan Old Town Hall), Biñan	Filipino	1980	
Ambrosio Rianzares Bautista; 1830-1903	Adviser of Emilio Aguinaldo. Author of the Acta de la proclamación de independencia del pueblo Filipino.	Ambrosio Rianzares Bautista Statue, Sentrong Pangkultura ng Biñan (Biñan Old Town Hall), Biñan	Filipino	December 7, 2018	
Agueda Kahabagan	First and only Filipino woman to become a General of the Philippine Revolution.	Santa Cruz Plaza, Santa Cruz	Filipino	March 14, 2016	
Labanan sa Sambat (Note: Battle of Sambat)	The height of the first battle of the Katipunan in Laguna, between the Maluninoning Branch and the Spanish forces.	Pagsanjan	Filipino	September 20, 1988	
Ang Bayan ng Liliw (Note: The Town of Liliw)	The town became a guerrilla base for the President Quezon's Own Guerrillas (PQOG) for the Filipinos and the Americans fighting against the Japanese.	Liliw	Filipino	August 29, 1971	
Ang Bayan ng Pakil (Note: The Town of Pakil)	First community founded by San Pedro Bautista, O.F.M., 1588.	Pakil	Filipino	October 18, 1988	
Birthplace of Jose Rizal	Original marker of the newly reconstructed Rizal Shrine, with a short biography of José Rizal and information on the destruction of the original house. Currently missing.	Rizal Shrine, Calamba	English	1950	
Birthplace of Jose Rizal	Reconstruction of the family house of the national hero José Rizal.	Rizal Shrine, Calamba	English	1951	
Cayo Alzona (1868–1927)	First head of foreign affairs. Provincial fiscal of Laguna and Tayabas (Quezon). The displayed marker is a replica of the missing original.	Sentrong Pangkultura ng Biñan (Biñan Old Town Hall), Biñan	Filipino	April 28, 1984	
Cayo Alzona (1868–1927)	Father of Encarnacion Alzona. Appointed secretary of foreign affairs in the Mabini Cabinet in 1899, and later became provincial fiscal of Isabela, then Tayabas. Became a Court of First Instance associate judge until his death. An updated marker of the missing original.	Plaza Rizal, Biñan	Filipino	August 26, 2026	
Church Among the Palms	A Church that begun with the American Presbyterian initiative for mission work at the College of Agriculture and School of Forestry (now University of the Philippines Los Baños) as the Los Baños College Church, later becoming a member of the United Church of Christ in the Philippines and the United Methodist Church	Church Among the Palms, Los Baños	Filipino	November 18, 2014	
Church of Cavinti	Part of Lumbang until 1619. First stone church and convent built in 1621.	Cavinti	English	1938	
Church of Lilio	Ecclesiastical administration of Liliw belonged to Nagcarlang up to 1605..	Liliw	English	1939	
Church of Los Baños	Hospital chapel was built from 1613 to 1727, dedicated to the Immaculate Conception. Currently missing.	Los Baños	English		
Church of Lumbang	Became a center for all missionary activities in Laguna. First stone church in Laguna, built in 1600.	Lumbang	English	1939	
Church of Mabitac	Town dates to 1613. Church was damaged by the 1880 earthquake.	Mabitac	English	1939	
Church of Majayjay	Founded in 1571. Original church made of field cane and nipa destroyed in 1576.	Majayjay	English		
Church of Nagcarlang	First church constructed by Rev. Tomas de Miranda, O.E.M., who was assigned here in 1583.	Nagcarlan	English	1938	
Church of Paete	Town founded in 1580. First church and convent built in 1646.	Paete	English	1939	
Church of Pagsanjan	Founded by Fr. Agustin de la Magdalena in 1687. Damaged during World War II.	Pagsanjan	English	1953	
Church of Pila	First church and convent constructed in 1618. Town center was transferred to present site in 1800 to prevent floods.	Pila	English	1939	
Church of Santa Cruz	Original church was constructed of stone in 1609 under the Franciscan Fr. Antonio De La Llave.	Santa Cruz	English	December 7, 1955	
Church of Santa Maria	The town was founded in 1602 and was called San Miguel until 1613.	Santa Maria	English	1939	
Church of Siniloan	Founded by Rev. Juan de Plasencia and Rev. Diego de Oropesa. Town formerly called Guiling-Guiling from 1583 to 1604.	Siniloan	English	1939	
College of Agriculture	Established on March 6, 1909, for the study and research of agriculture.	UPCA Alumni Plaza (Carabao Park), University of the Philippines Los Baños	Filipino	October 10, 2010	
Conrado Benitez y Francia (1889–1971)	First Filipino dean of College of Liberal Arts, University of the Philippines	General Tinio St., Pagsanjan	Filipino	November 26, 1982	
Emilio Jacinto; 1875–1899	Revolutionary. Headed the Battle of Maimpis in Magdalena.	Emilio Jacinto Monument, Town plaza, Magdalena	Filipino	December 14, 2017	
Encarnacion Alzona	Historian and suffragist. First Filipino woman to attain a Ph.D. degree. Conferred the National Scientist of the Philippines award in 1985.	Sentrong Pangkultura ng Biñan (Old Biñan Town Hall), Biñan	Filipino	March 21, 2026	
Francisco Benitez	Known educator and author. One of the first Filipino pensionados of the United States in 1905.	Francisco Benitez Memorial School, Pagsanjan	Filipino	June 30, 1987	
Francisco Mercado; 1818–1898	Married Teodora Alonso. Described by José Rizal as an honorable man, paragon of simple living.	Sentrong Pangkultura ng Biñan (Old Biñan Town Hall), Biñan	Filipino	May 11, 2018	
Heneral Vicente Lim (1888–1944) (Note: General Vicente Lim (1888–1944))	One of the founders of the Boy Scouts of the Philippines and became a distinguished general during the Second World War. Installed in ruins of his childhood home.	M.H. del Pilar St., Calamba	Filipino	February 24, 1982	
Hospital de Aguas Santas (Note: Holy Waters Hospital)	Thermal waters caught the attention of Rev. Pedro Bautista, O.F.M., in 1590. A modern hospital was built in 1721.	Los Baños	English	1939	
International Rice Research Institute	Established through the cooperation of Ford and Rockefeller Foundations to advance rice production.	IRRI, Los Baños	Filipino, English	2010	
Jose Rizal; 1861–1896	Baptistery of Calamba Church, the site where José Rizal was baptized on June 22, 1861.	Saint John the Baptist Parish Church, Calamba	Filipino	June 18, 1960	
Jose Rizal (1861–1896)	Tallest Rizal statue unveiled on his sesquicentennial birthday anniversary.	Rizal Monument, Jose Rizal Plaza, Calamba	Filipino	June 19, 2011	
Ang Gusaling Pamahalaan ng Laguna (Note: The Government Building of Laguna)	Built by the Provincial Government of Laguna, designed by William E. Parsons.	Laguna Provincial Capitol, Santa Cruz	Filipino	July 28, 2015	
Juan Cailles; 1871–1951	Patriot and revolutionary. Defeated the Americans at the Battle of Mabitac.	Laguna Provincial Capitol Grounds, Santa Cruz	Filipino	March 9, 2013	
Katedral ng San Pablo (Note: Cathedral of San Pablo)	First built by Augustinian friars. Destroyed during the liberation in 1945. Currently missing.	San Pablo	Filipino	December 14, 1986	
Kuwartel ng Santo Domingo (Note: Cuartel of Santo Domingo)	Part of the Dominican hacienda and was used for the civil guards.	Santa Rosa	Filipino	September 20, 2005	
Labanan sa Mabitac (Note: Battle of Mabitac)	Battle between the Filipino Revolutionary Army, under Juan Cailles, and the Americans under Colonel Cheatham.	Mabitac	Filipino	October 27, 1995	
Labanan sa Maimpis (Note: Battle of Maimpis)	Battle between the Spanish and Filipino forces headed by Emilio Jacinto. February 27, 1898.	Magdalena	Filipino	January 18, 2023	
Labanan sa Santa Cruz, Laguna (Note: Battle of Santa Cruz, Laguna)	Where anti-Japanese Filipino-Chinese forces fought to liberate the town during WWII.	Santa Cruz Plaza, Santa Cruz	Filipino	2010	
Luisiana	Started as a visita of Majayjay. Became fully independent from Majayjay on April 3, 1854.	Luisiana	Filipino	April 3, 1997	
Lunsod ng San Pablo (Note: City of San Pablo)	Known as Sampaloc. Became a town in 1647. Citizens joined the revolution under Miguel Malvar in 1896. Became a city in 1940.	San Pablo City Plaza	Filipino	1954	
Mahayhay	Became an encomienda on November 14, 1571. Where Emilio Jacinto got sick and died.	F. Blumentritt St., Majayjay	Filipino	October 2, 1971	
Mansiyong Fule-Malvar (Note: Fule-Malvar Mansion)	Built in the romantic-classicism style by the couple Eusebia Fule and Potenciano Malvar.	San Pablo	Filipino	February 16, 1991	
Marcelo Adonay y Quintera (1848–1928)	Composer of many church songs. Learned music while serving at San Agustin Church.Installed in the location of his former house.	Pakil	Filipino	February 6, 1983	
Pabinyagan ng Simbahang Katoliko ng Kalamba (Note: Baptistry of the Catholic Church of Calamba)	Site where José Rizal was baptized. Designated as a national historical landmark.	Calamba Church, Calamba	Filipino	1960	
Paciano Rizal	Became the Secretary of Finance under the revolutionary administrative government of Central Luzon.	Provincial Police Office, B. Gen Paciano Rizal Camp, Santa Cruz	Filipino	July 28, 2021	
Paciano Rizal; 1851–1930	Installed in the house of his retirement and final resting place. Born on March 9, 1851. Became a revolutionary general.	Paciano Rizal Shrine, Los Baños	Filipino	April 13, 1983	
Pagsanjan	Formerly a barrio of Lumbang. Became a separate municipality in 1668.	Pagsanjan Arch, Pagsanjan	English	1953	
Pagsanjan Municipal Building	Occupied by the revolutionary forces in 1898. Served as Laguna's first public school from 1903 to 1907.	Municipal Hall, Pagsanjan	Filipino	1956	
Pila	Was granted the title "La Noble Villa de Pila" by the Spaniards in the seventeenth century.	Pila town plaza (currently within NHCP storage)	Filipino	2004	
Pila	Was granted the title "La Noble Villa de Pila" by the Spaniards in the seventeenth century.	Pila town plaza	Filipino	2007	
Pook ng Bilangguang Kampo sa Los Baños (Note: Site of Los Baños Internment Camp)	Used by the Japanese as an internment prison for Allied captives during WWII. Site of the Raid at Los Baños.	Baker Hall, University of the Philippines Los Baños, Los Baños	Filipino	February 23, 2005	
Pook na Pinaglibingan kay Emilio Jacinto (Note: Burial Site of Emilio Jacinto)	Where Emilio Jacinto was initially buried after his death on April 16, 1899.	Santa Cruz	Filipino	April 16, 1999	
Puerta Real ng Pagsanjan (Note: Royal Gate of Pagsanjan)	Built by the Pagsanjeños from 1778 to 1780 as gratitude for the Our Lady of Guadalupe.	Pagsanjan Arch, Pagsanjan	Filipino	December 6, 2018	
Rizal in Biñan	Town where Rizal received his first formal schooling under Justiniano Cruz.	General Capinpin Street, Biñan	English	1948	
Rizal sa Binyang (Note: Rizal in Biñan)	Where Rizal received his first formal education from Maestro Justiniano Aquino Cruz.	Biñan (currently within NHCP storage)	Filipino	1960	
Sementeryo sa Ilalim ng Lupa ng Nagcarlan (Note: Underground Cemetery of Nagcarlan)	Became a subterranean meeting place for the revolutionary movement.	Nagcarlan Underground Cemetery gate, Nagcarlan	Filipino	October 24, 1981	
Simbahan ng Bay (Note: Church of Bay)	Constructed by Rev. Fr. P. Martin de Rada, Augustinian priest, 1571.	Bay Church façade, Bay	Filipino	August 28, 1985	
Simbahan ng Magdalena (Note: Church of Magdalena)	First built in 1820, with Mary Magdalene as patron. Current church built in 1829 with adobe.	Magdalena	Filipino	December 11, 2018	
Simbahan ng Majayjay (Note: Church of Majayjay)	First built by Augustinian friars after the pacification of natives by Salcedo in 1571.	Majayjay	Filipino	June 27, 1993	
Ang Simbahan ng Paete (Note: The Church of Paete)	Declared a national historical landmark by the NHCP.	Paete	Filipino	September 13, 1981	
Ang Simbahan ng Pakil (Note: The Church of Pakil)	Built out of light materials by Father Pedro de Alcantara when Pakil became separated from Paete in 1676.	Pakil	Filipino	September 18, 1988	
Simbahan ng San Pablo (Note: Church of San Pablo)	Established by Augustinians. Turned over to Franciscans from 1694 to 1912.	San Pablo	English	1957	
Trinidad Rizal (1868–1951)	10th sibling of José Rizal One of the founders of Asociacion Feminista Filipina on June 30, 1905. Installed near her final resting place.	Paciano Rizal Ancestral House, Los Baños	Filipino	June 6, 2018	

== Quezon ==
This table lists 43 markers from the province of Quezon.

Marker title	Description	Location	Language	Date issued	Image
Apolinario de la Cruz (1815–1841)	Better known as "Hermano Pule", born at this site in Sitio Pandak, Lucban, Tayabas (now Quezon).	Lucban	Filipino	November 4, 1977	
Apolinario de la Cruz	Better known as "Hermano Pule", established Cofradia de San Jose to protest friar monopoly in the Philippines.	Lucban	Filipino	November 4, 1997	
Apolinario de la Cruz	Better known as "Hermano Pule," established Cofradia de San Jose to protest friar monopoly in the Philippines.	Lucban	Filipino	October 22, 1999	
Apolinario dela Cruz (1815–1841)	Better known as "Hermano Pule," established Cofradia de San Jose to protest friar monopoly in the Philippines.	Tayabas	Filipino	2010	
Basilika ng Tayabas (Note: Basilica of Tayabas)	Established by the Franciscans in 1585 with the first structure built in 1590 and the first stone church in 1600. Elevated to a minor basilica in 1988 and declared a National Cultural Treasure in 2001.	Tayabas Basilica, Tayabas	Filipino	October 12, 2025	
Ang Bayan ng Mauban (Note: The Town of Mauban)	Established by the Franciscans in 1583. A Katipunan branch was established in San Miguel in 1896.	Mauban Municipal Hall, Mauban	Filipino	July 15, 1984	
Casa de Comunidad de Tayabas (Note: Community House of Tayabas)	Served as a civic building for the town. Built in 1776 by Gobernadorcillo Francisco Lopez.	Tayabas	Filipino	September 20, 1988	
Church of Atimonan	First church burned by the Dutch in 1640. Present church damaged by the earthquake of August 20, 1937.	Atimonan	English	1939	
Church of Lucban	First church dates to 1595, and was burned in 1629. The present church was complete in 1738.	Lucban	English	1939	
Church of Mauban	First church and convent constructed in 1647. Town transferred to the site on the same year.	Mauban Church façade, Mauban	English	1939	
Church of Sariaya	First church dates to 1599. The present church was built in 1748.	Sariaya	English	1938	
Claro Recto y Mayo (1890–1960)	Was born in Tiaong. Patriotic statesman. Headed the 1934 Philippine Constitutional Convention election	Claro M. Recto Monument, Recto St. cor. Pan-Philippine Highway, Tiaong	Filipino	February 8, 1984	
Colegio Sagrado Corazon de Jesus	Founded in April 1884 by Fausta Labrador. Premier private school for both boys and girls.	Sacred Heart College, Lucena	Spanish	1950	
Don Placido Escudero Dam	Built in 1572 by Don Ciriaco Nadres. Rebuilt in 1904 and in 1937.	Villa Escudero, Tiaong	English	1938	
Gala-Rodriguez House	Designated as a heritage house by the NHCP.	Sariaya	English	2008	
General Guillermo Peñamante Nakar (1905–1942)	Martyred WWII General. Leader of the 1st Battalion and the 71st Infantry Division of the USAFFE.	General Nakar	Filipino	June 10, 2012	
Horacio de la Costa, S.J.	Distinguished Jesuit scholar. Became the first Filipino head of the Jesuits in the Philippines in 1946.	Mauban	Filipino	May 9, 1982	
Ika-400 Taong Pagdiriwang ng Pagiging Krisityano ng Bayan ng Gumaca (Note: 400th Anniversary of the Christianization of the Town of Gumaca)	400th Anniversary of the Christianization of the Town of Gumaca	San Diego de Alcala Park, Gumaca	Filipino	1982	
Iskong Bantay (Note: Isko the Guardian)	Defended the town during the raid of 1872. One of the seven observation and defense towers built by the Spaniards. Iskong Bantay was the nickname of Francisco Tandas, a chief defender of the town.	Atimonan	English	1952	
Kutang San Diego (Note: Fort San Diego)	Built at the end of eighteenth century as a defense against sea raiders.	San Diego Fortress, Gumaca	English	March 17, 1981	
Ang Labanan sa Alitao; Tayabas, Quezon (Note: The Battle of Alitao: Tayabas, Quezon)	Where a bloody battle on November 1, 1841, commenced between the forces of the Spaniards under Joaquin Huet and Filipinos under Apolinario de la Cruz.	Tayabas	Filipino	October 26, 2001	
Labanan sa Baryo Piis; Lucban, Quezon (Note: Battle of Barrio Piis: Lucban, Quezon)	Where USAFFE and Japanese forces clashed on December 26, 1941	Lucban-Sampaloc Road, Baryo Piis, Lucban	Filipino	May 2, 2011	
La Casa de Doña Ana (Note: The House of Doña Ana)	Heritage house, the only neoclassical structure in Lucban	Lucban	Filipino	April 8, 1995	
Lucban (1578–1978)	Town first established in 1578 by the Franciscans. Became town in 1595.	Lucban	Filipino	May 14, 1978	
Lucena	Previously a part of Tayabas. Town name came from the hometown of P. Mariano Granja, who served as a parish priest.	Lucena	Filipino	1952	
Macario Sakay	Katipunero general. After his capture by the Americans in 1901, he established a republic with its main headquarters at Mount San Cristobal.	Holy Trinity Compound, Brgy. Santa Lucia, Dolores	Filipino	March 27, 1993	
Manuel L. Quezon	President of the Commonwealth of the Philippines and father of the National Language.	Perez Park, Capitol Compound, Barangay 10, Lucena	Filipino	November 26, 2025	
Manuel S. Enverga (1909–1981)	Patriot and public servant. Established Luzonian Colleges on February 11, 1947.	Mauban	Filipino	2009	
Manuel S. Enverga (1909–1981)	Quezon First District Representative, 1953–1969.	Enverga Monument, Enverga University, Lucena	Filipino	2009	
Natalio Enriquez House	Declared by the NHCP as a heritage house.	Sariaya	English	2008	
Quezon Province				November 4, 1977	
Quezon Provincial Capitol	Old Tayabas capitol. First built in 1908 and expanded in 1930.	Lucena	Filipino	August 17, 1987	
Rizal Hill Park	Became known as "Calvario." Built as a monument for José Rizal in 1925.	Mauban	Filipino	2011	
Rodriguez House	Designated as a heritage house by the NHCP.	Sairaya	English	2008	
Sacred Heart College	The oldest Catholic school in Quezon. Established on April 27, 1884.	Sacred Heart College Compound, Lucena	Filipino	March 10, 1984	
Ang Simbahan ng Gumaca (1582) (Note: The Church of Gumaca (1582))	Largest an oldest Catholic Church in Quezon. First built in 1582.	Gumaca Church, Gumaca	Filipino	November 13, 1973	
Simbahan ng Lucena (Note: Church of Lucena)	Established the parish of San Fernando on March 1, 1881. Fr. Mariano Granja served as first parish priest.	Lucena	Filipino	1953	
Simbahan ng Pagbilao (Note: Church of Pagbilao)	Parish established by the Franciscans in 1865. Renovated in 1954.	Pagbilao	Filipino	July 4, 1986	
Ang Simbahan ng Tayabas (Note: The Church of Tayabas)	Built by Franciscans in 1585 under the patronage of St. Michael the Archangel.	Tayabas	Filipino	November 11, 1982	
Tayabas	Founded by Franciscan friars in 1578. Became the capital of the province from 1605 to 1901.	Tayabas	Filipino	January 15, 1978	
Tulay Malagonlong (Note: Malagonlong Bridge)	One of the remaining Spanish stone bridges. Built in 1840 under the parish priest of Tayabas, Fr. Antonio Mateos.	Tayabas	Filipino	November 26, 2004	
Vera's Guerilla Tayabas	Guerilla operation in Quezon during WWII established by Capt. Epifanio Vera.	Lopez	Filipino	May 7, 2014	
Villa Escudero	A historical villa of independence during the Spanish, American, and Japanese periods.	Villa Escudero, Tiaong	Filipino, English	June 3, 1984	

== Rizal ==
This table lists 31 markers from the province of Rizal.

Marker title	Description	Location	Language	Date issued	Image
Ang Bahay ni Vicente S. Manansala (Note: The House of Vicente S. Manansala)	Declared by the NHCP as a national historical landmark.	Manansala House, 73 Gloria St., San Carlos Heights, Tayuman, Binangonan	Filipino	January 22, 1984	
Bayan ng Rodriguez (Note: Town of Rodriguez)	Created from barrios of San Mateo, became a site of Katipunan activities.	Rodriguez	Filipino	2009; December 19, 2016	
Ang Bayan ng Morong (Note: The Town of Morong)	Established in 1578. Became the capital of the Politico-Militar Distrito de Morong.	Morong	Filipino	December 9, 1973	
Carlos "Botong" Francisco (1912–1969)	National Artist, painter, and muralist.	Carlos "Botong" Francisco House, 217 Doña Aurora St., Brgy. Poblacion Itaas, Angono	Filipino	April 3, 2024	
Church of Antipolo	A famous pilgrimage site. Houses the image of the Nuestra Señora de la Paz y del Buen Viaje.	Antipolo Church, Antipolo	English	1937	
Church of Baras	Franciscans buolt the first church in 1595. Church was completed in 1686.	Baras Church façade, Baras	English	1939	
Church of Morong	Town dates to 1578. The present church was constructed after the fire of 1612.	Morong Church façade, Morong	English	1939	
Church of Tanay	First church built in 1606. Formerly part of Pililla up to 1606.	Tanay Church façade, Tanay	English	1939	
Claudio Intermediate School	Constructed in 1921, dedicated to the memory of Tomas Mateo Claudio.	Morong (currently within NHCP storage)	English	1953	
Gobierno Departmental del Centro de Luzon (Note: Departmental Government of Central Luzon)	Administered the revolutionary governments among multiple provinces.	Sitio Bagong Sigla, Mt. Puray, Rodriguez	Filipino	April 25, 2024	
Jose Rizal	National hero. Doctor, polyglot, and sculptor. Wrote Noli me Tángere and El filibusterismo.	Taytay Elementary School, L. Wood Street, Brgy. Dolores, Taytay	Filipino	2011	
Jose Rizal (1861–1896)	National hero. Province of Rizal named after him though the Philippine Commission Act No. 137.	Rizal Provincial Capitol, Ynares Center Complex, Antipolo	Filipino	2012	
Juan M. Sumulong (1874–1942)	Secretary of the revolutionaries against Spain, founder of the Province of Rizal.	Juan Sumulong Monument, Antipolo Town Plaza, Antipolo	Filipino	December 27, 1974	
Labanan ng Puray (Note: Battle of Puray)	Filipino victory against the Spaniards through guerilla warfare under Gen. Licerio Geronimo.	Sitio Bagong Sigla, Mt. Puray, Rodriguez	Filipino	April 25, 2024	
Licerio I. Geronimo (1855–1924)	Hero in the Battle of San Mateo. Born on August 27, 1855. Worked in the Philippine Constabulary.	Rodriguez Town Plaza, Rodriguez	Filipino	February 20, 1993	
Licerio L. Geronimo (1855–1924)	Hero in the Battle of San Mateo. Was able to make Spanish forces retreat after they invaded the forces of Emilio Aguinaldo at Mount Puray.	Camp General Licerio I. Geronimo, Taytay	Filipino	February 13, 2017	
Marking's Guerillas	Headed the successful Battle of Ipo Dam, 1945.	Old Morong Municipal Hall, Morong	Filipino	February 17, 2026	
Morong	Established in 1578. Became the capital of the politico-militar district of Morong in 1853.	Old Morong Municipal Hall, Morong	Filipino	1971	
Morong High School Building	Constructed by forced labor from 1881 to 1883. Was taken over by Katipuneros, Americans, and the Japanese during different periods.	Morong	English		
Nuestra Señora de la Paz y Buen Viaje (Note: Our Lady of Peace and Good Voyage)	Brought from Mexico to Manila by Governor-general Juna Niño de Tavora in 1626.	Antipolo Church façade, Antipolo	English	1937	
Paul P. de la Gironiere	French traveler to the Philippines who established the hacienda at Jala Jala.	Jalajala	Filipino	December 6, 1980	
Simbahan at Dambana ng Nuestra Señora de Aranzazu (Note: Church and Shrine of Our Lady of Aranzazu)	Church was finished in 1715. Dr. Pio Valenzuela was jailed in the church convent in August 1896.	San Mateo	Filipino	August 28, 2018	
Simbahan ng Binangonan (Note: Church of Binangonan)	Built by the Franciscans as a visita of Morong, 1621.	Saint Ursula Parish Church, Binangonan	Filipino	October 21, 2021	
Simbahan ng Bosoboso (Note: Church of Bosoboso)	Established as a missionary base for Jesuits during the seventeenth century. Restored in 1995.	Boso-Boso, Antipolo	Filipino	October 27, 2001	
Simbahan ng Cainta (Note: Church of Cainta)	Stone church built by Jesuit Fr. Gaspar Marco in 1707. Offered to the Nuestra Señora de la Luz in 1727.	Cainta Church façade, Cainta	Filipino	2007	
Simbahan ng Lumang Bosoboso (Note: Church of Old Bosoboso)	First church built by Franciscans to evangelize the Dumagats of Tanay in 1669. Restored in 1995.	Boso-Boso, Antipolo	Filipino	June 14, 2018	
Simbahan ng Pililla (Note: Church of Pililla)	The Franciscans arrived in 1572. First built in 1583 using light materials.	Pililla	Filipino	January 16, 1977	
Simbahan ng Taytay (Note: Church of Taytay)	First built by Franciscans by using light materials in 1759 near the shore of Laguna de Bay. Moved to the present site by Fr. Pedro Chirino, S.J. in 1591.	Taytay Church façade, Taytay	Filipino	June 24, 1992	
Tomas Claudio (1892–1918)	World War I soldier. Tomas Claudio Memorial School was named in his honor.	Tomas Claudio Monument, Town Plaza, Morong	Filipino	May 27, 1992	
Town of Tanay	Part of Pililla from 1573 to 1606. Moved to the present site and founded the town in 1640.	Tanay Town Plaza, Tanay	English	1939	
Town of Tanay	First stone church finished in 1680. Present church was built from 1773 to 1783.	Tanay Town Plaza, Tanay	English	1939	
Town of Tanay	Rawang Pass ang Kalinawan Plateau became strongholds of Filipinos against Spain and in the Filipino-American War.	Tanay Town Plaza, Tanay	English	1939	
Yungib ng Pamitinan (Note: Pamitinan Cave)	Secret meeting site of Andrés Bonifacio. Was a sacred ground to early Filipinos. Known as the dwelling place of the mythical Bernardo Carpio.	Rodriguez	Filipino	April 12, 1997	

== See also ==
- List of Cultural Properties of the Philippines in Calabarzon

== Bibliography ==
- Historical Markers: Regions I-IV and CAR. National Historical Institute. 1993.
- Historical Markers (1992 - 2006). National Historical Institute. 2008.
- A list of sites and structures with historical markers, as of 16 January 2012
- A list of institutions with historical markers, as of 16 January 2012
