= Taal Municipal Hall =

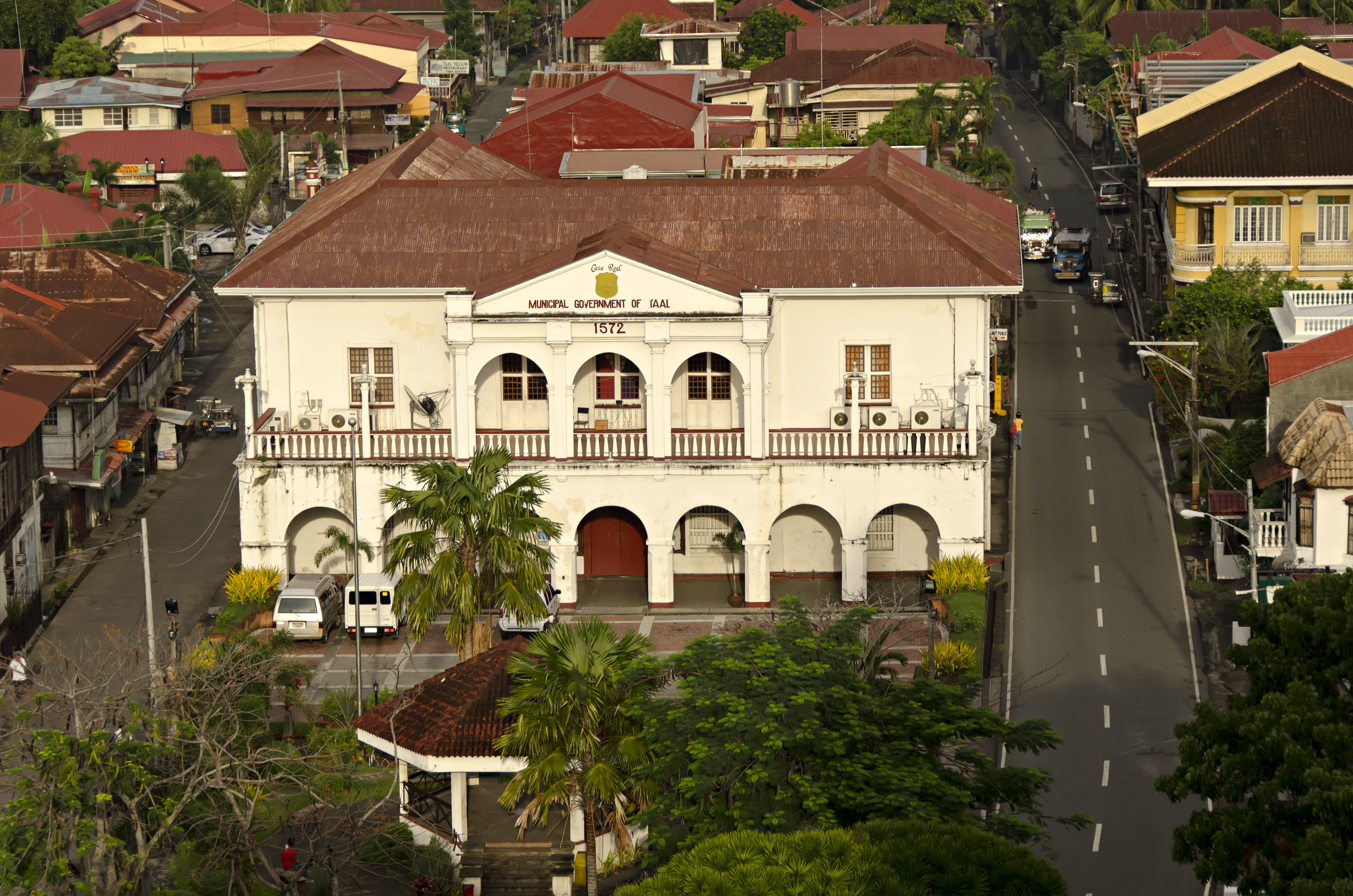
- Aerial view of Taal Municipal Hall
- Interactive map of the Taal Municipal Hall area
- Former names: Casa Real

General information
- Location: Taal, Batangas, Philippines
- Coordinates: 13°52′48.22″N 120°55′21.9″E
- Construction started: 1845

National Historical Landmarks
- Designated: 2024

The Taal Municipal Hall is the seat of the municipal government of Taal in Batangas, Philippines.

== Background ==
Formerly known as casa real, it was erected in 1845 and served as Taal's government building during the Spanish era in the Philippines. The municipal hall exemplifies neoclassical architecture, with a second-floor balcony supported by a portico underneath.

Celestino Mayordomo, a priest in Taal, contributed financially to the construction of the municipal hall. The funds for its construction came from the earnings of the church-owned fish pens.

The Taal Municipal Hall is the seat of the municipal government of Taal up to this day. In 1972, the National Historical Commission of the Philippines (NHCP) installed a historical marker on the building's façade. In 2024, NHCP declared the municipal hall as a historical landmark.

== Gallery ==
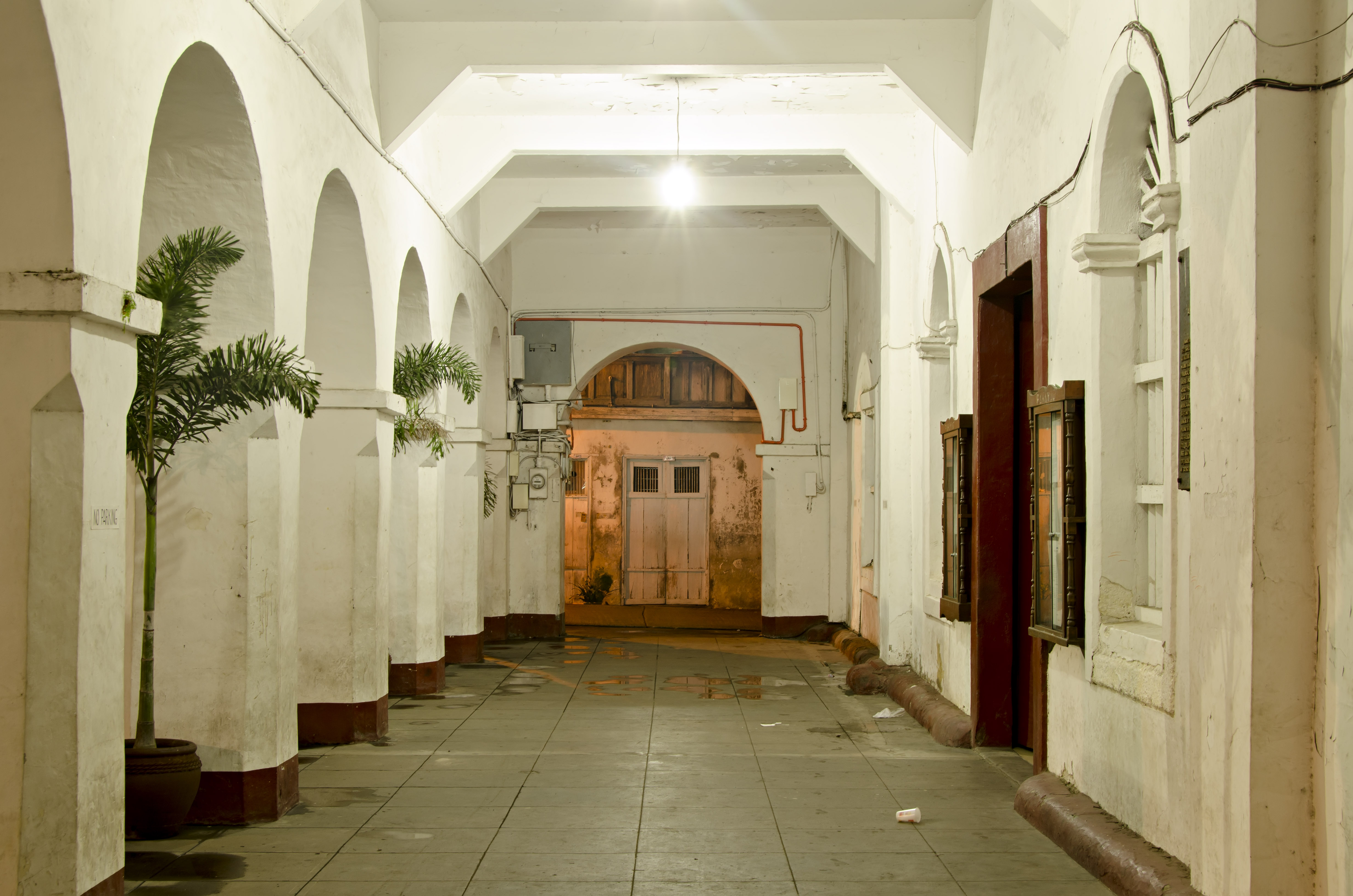
Inside the municipal hall

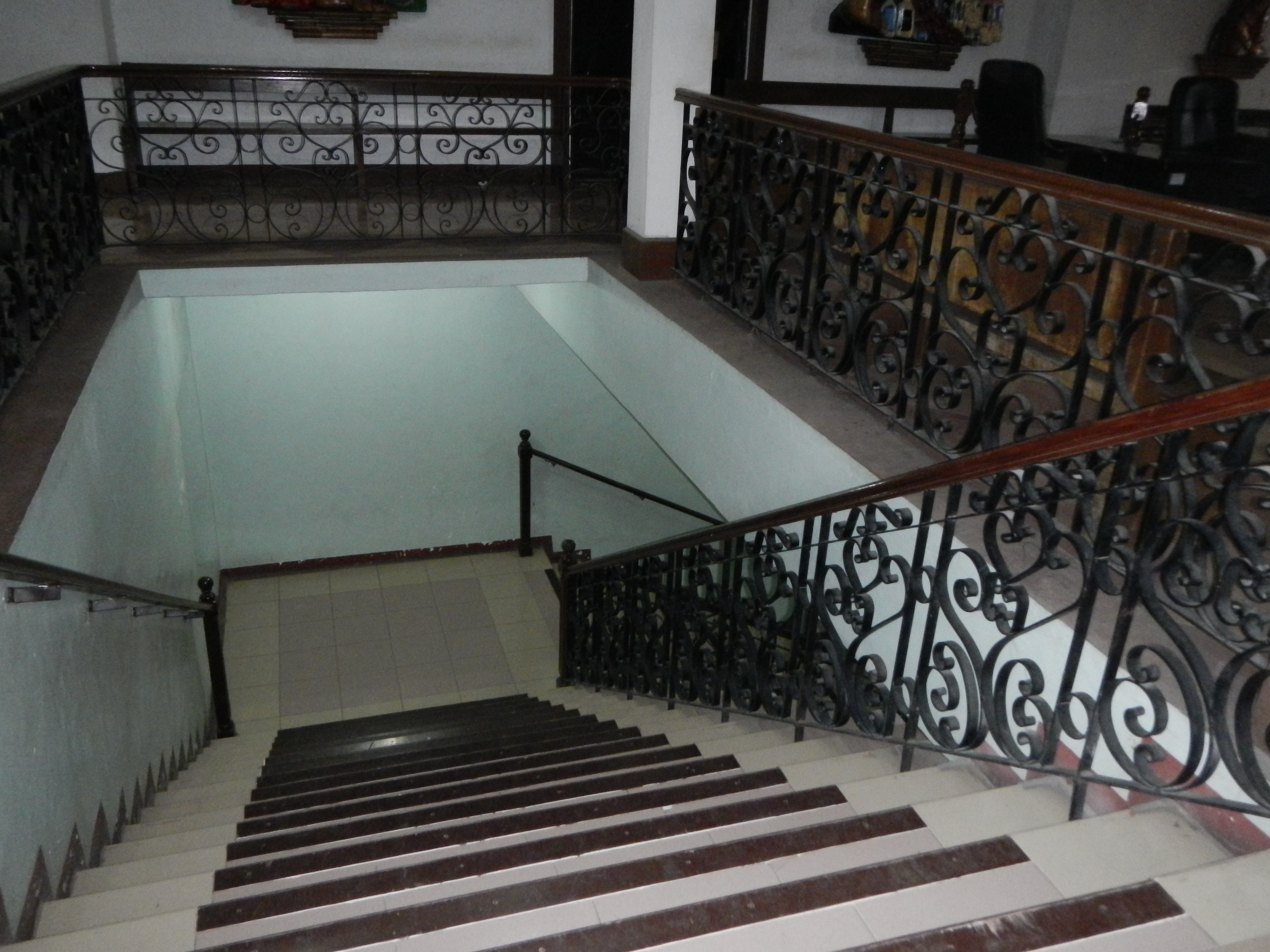
Stairs

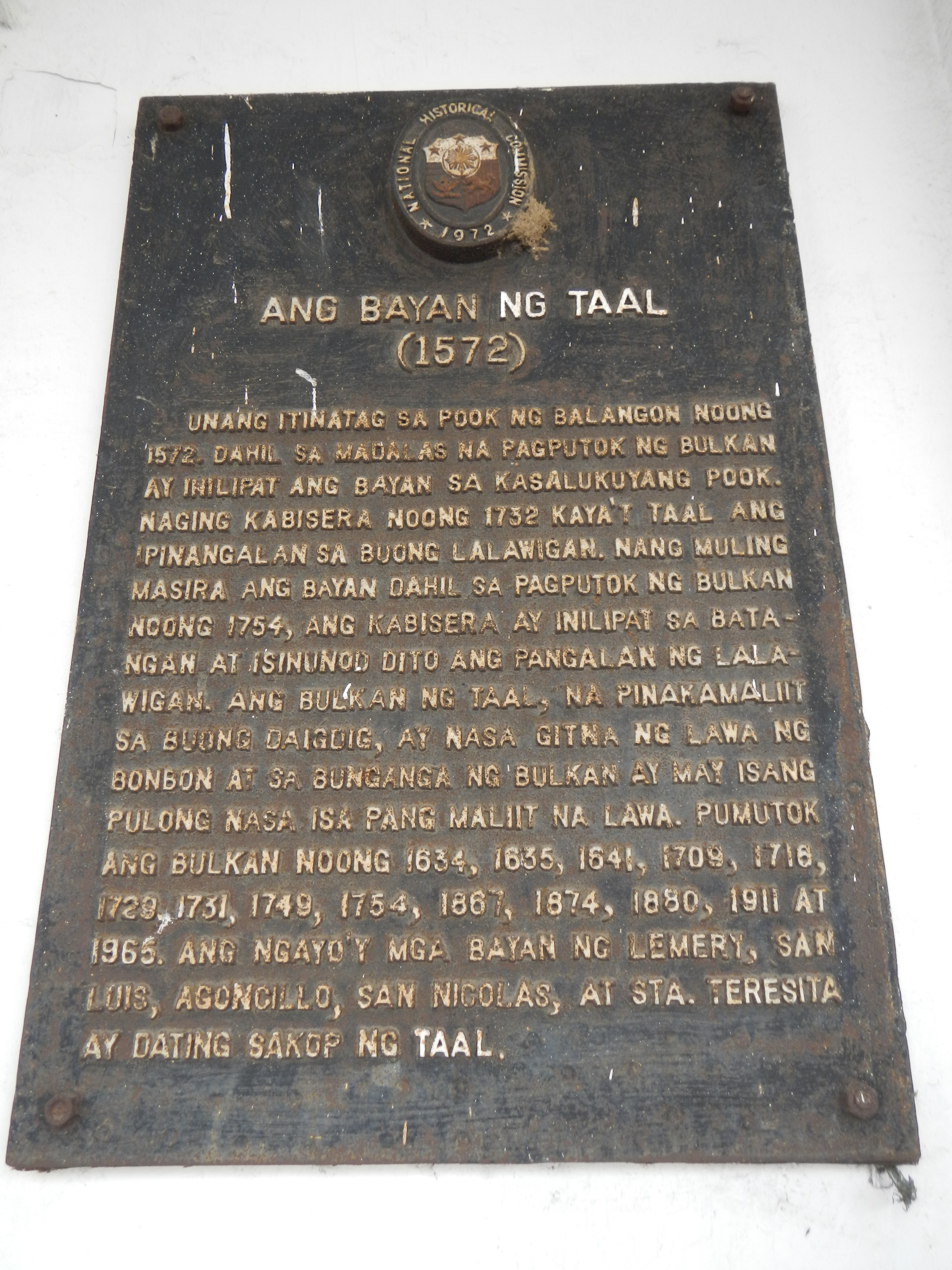
1972 NHCP historical marker
