= Bonifacio Trial House =

Historic mansion in Cavite, Philippines

- Bahay na Pinaglitisan kay Andres Bonifacio (Filipino)
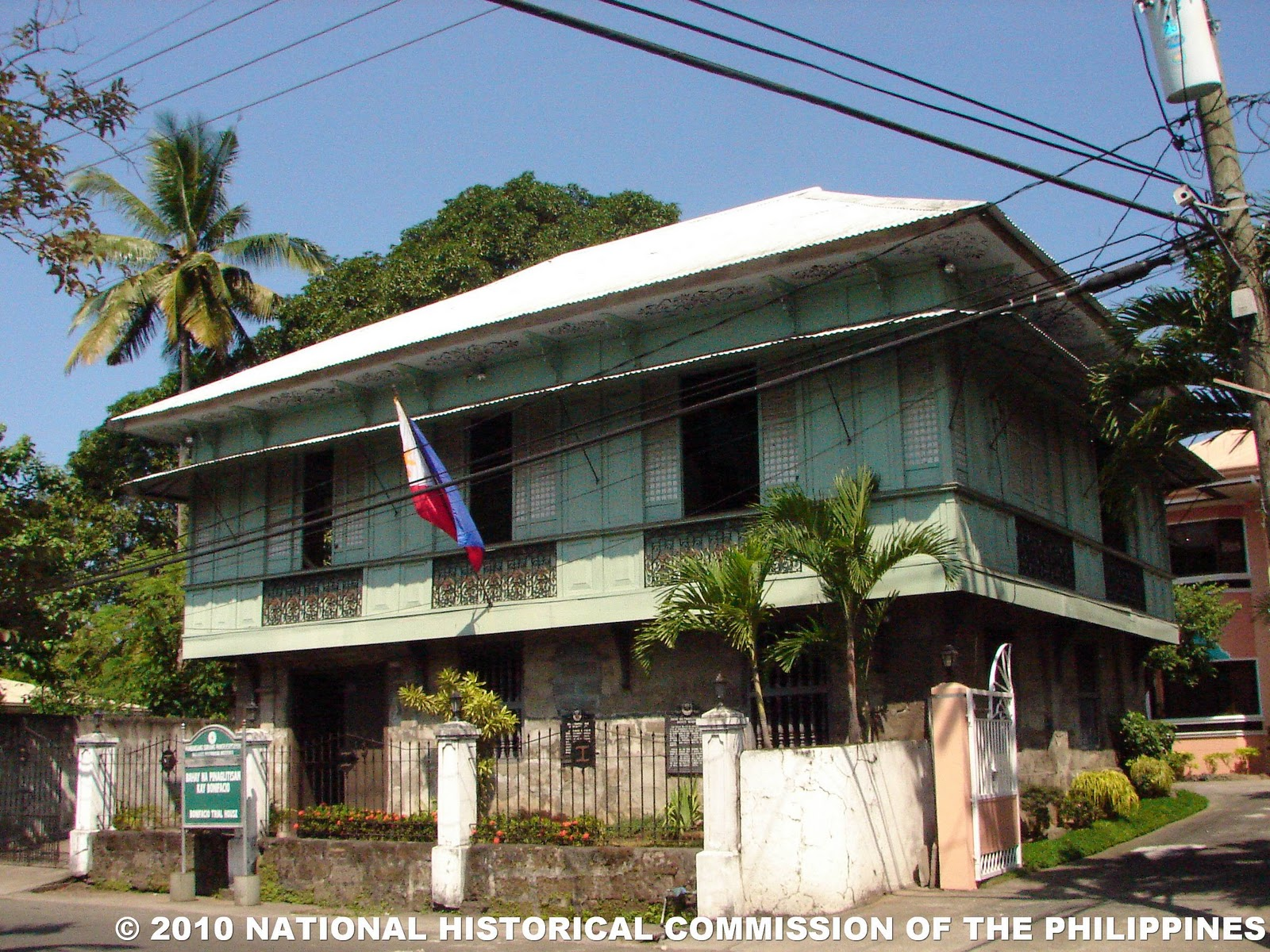
- The house of Roderico Reyes in Maragondon, Cavite, where Andres Bonifacio and his brother Procopio were tried by a court-martial in May 1897.
- Interactive map of the Bonifacio Trial House area
- Alternative names: Roderico Reyes Ancestral House

General information
- Status: National Historical Landmark
- Type: Mansion
- Architectural style: Bahay na Bato
- Location: Maragondon, Cavite, Philippines
- Coordinates: 14°16′27″N 120°44′13″E
- Current tenants: National Historical Commission of the Philippines
- Owner: Government of the Philippines

Technical details
- Material: Stones, Bricks, and Wood
- Floor count: Two

The Roderico Reyes Ancestral House, more commonly known as the Bonifacio Trial House, is a historic house and museum in Maragondon, Cavite, Philippines. It was built in 1889 and served as a military court, wherein it has been a witness to the trial of Andres Bonifacio in 1897.

== History ==
The plan for a new government was established since the emergence of the Philippine Revolution on August 23, 1896. Its aim was to unite the Katipuneros under a single leadership. The Magdalo faction nominated Emilio Aguinaldo, while the Magdiwang faction retained Bonifacio, who was the "Supremo" of the Katipunan. On March 22, 1897, the revolutionary government was established at the Tejeros Convention. Emilio Aguinaldo was the president of the new government, while Bonifacio was declared as the minister of interior. However, Daniel Tirona of Magdalo questioned Bonifacio's qualifications for the position. Upon his authority as the presiding officer, he declared all the proceedings null and void.

Bonifacio, then, established his own government in Naic, Cavite. He was arrested for refusing the revolutionary government, upon the orders of Emilio Aguinaldo, at Indang, Cavite. His wife, Gregoria de Jesus, and his brother, Procopio, were also arrested. Andres Bonifacio was brought to a military court in Maragondon for a pre-trial hearing. On May 5, 1897, the brothers of Bonifacio were charged by the court with treason and sedition. On May 6, 1897, they were sentenced with the death penalty.

His brothers were brought by Major Lazaro Macapagal to Mount Tala on May 10, 1897. As soon as they reached Hulog, a barrio within the vicinity of Mount Nagpatong, Major Makapagal opened his sealed orders, upon Bonifacio's insistence. The order revealed that severe punishment awaited him if he would fail to execute the two brothers of Andres Bonifacio. The death of the Father of the Revolution, Andres Bonifacio, still remains to be controversial at present.

== Present condition ==
The house has been converted into a museum. The Museo ng Paglilitis ni Andres Bonifacio was formally inaugurated on November 28, 2014. Arnel Paciano D. Casanova, president and presiding head officer of the Bases Conversion and Development Authority, was the guest speaker of the event. It houses life-size dioramas commemorating the trial scene of Andres Bonifacio.

=== Historical designation ===
The National Historical Commission of the Philippines (NHCP) has installed two historical markers commemorating the building on its facade. The first marker, in English, was installed in 1948 by NHCP's predecessor, the Philippines Historical Committee (PHC). The second, in Filipino, was installed in 2000 by the later predecessor of the NHCP, the National Historical Institute (NHI). The NHI has designated the building as a National Historical Landmark on June 4, 1997, and this fact is also mentioned on the second marker.

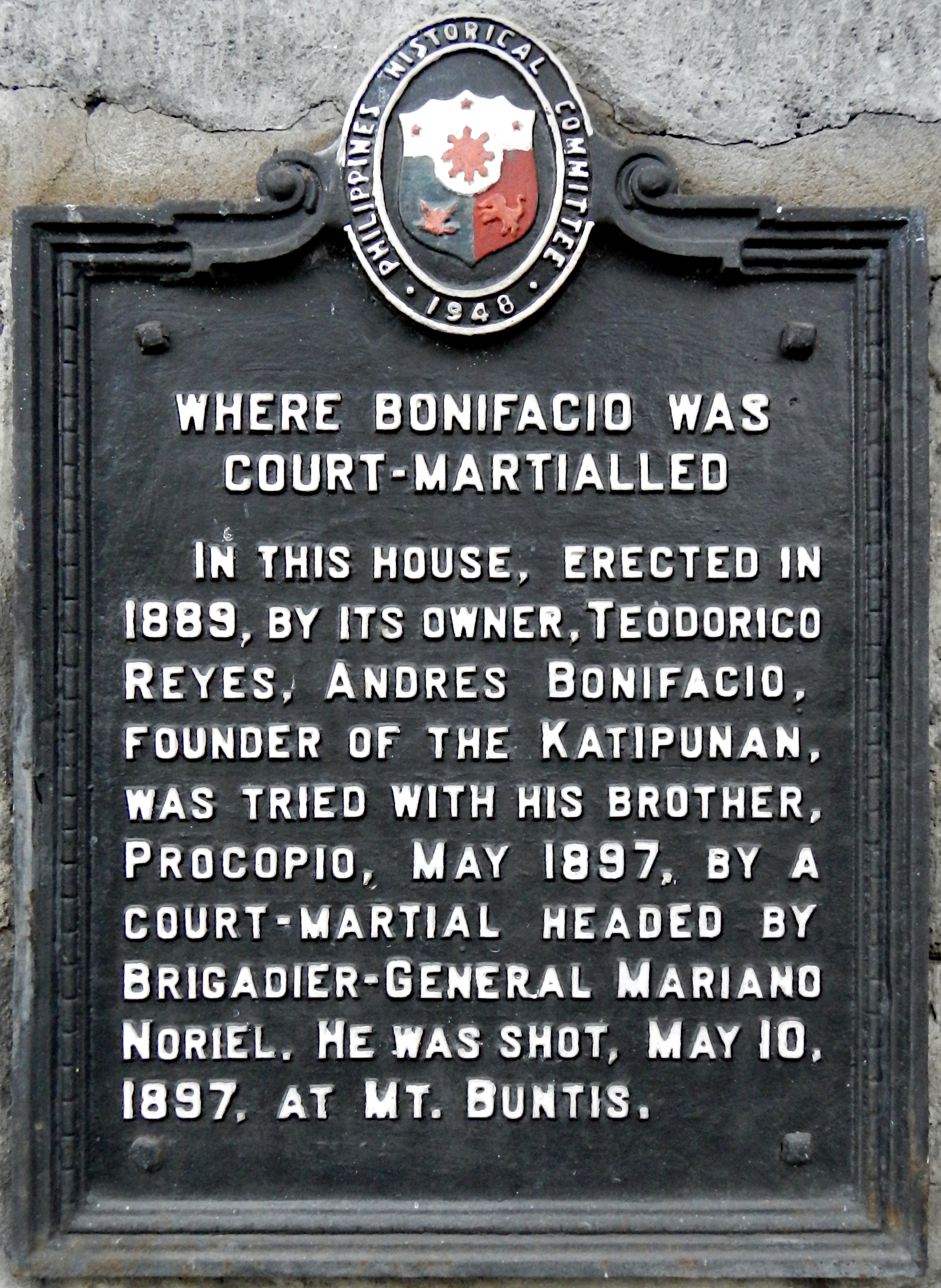
Photo of the 1948 historical marker

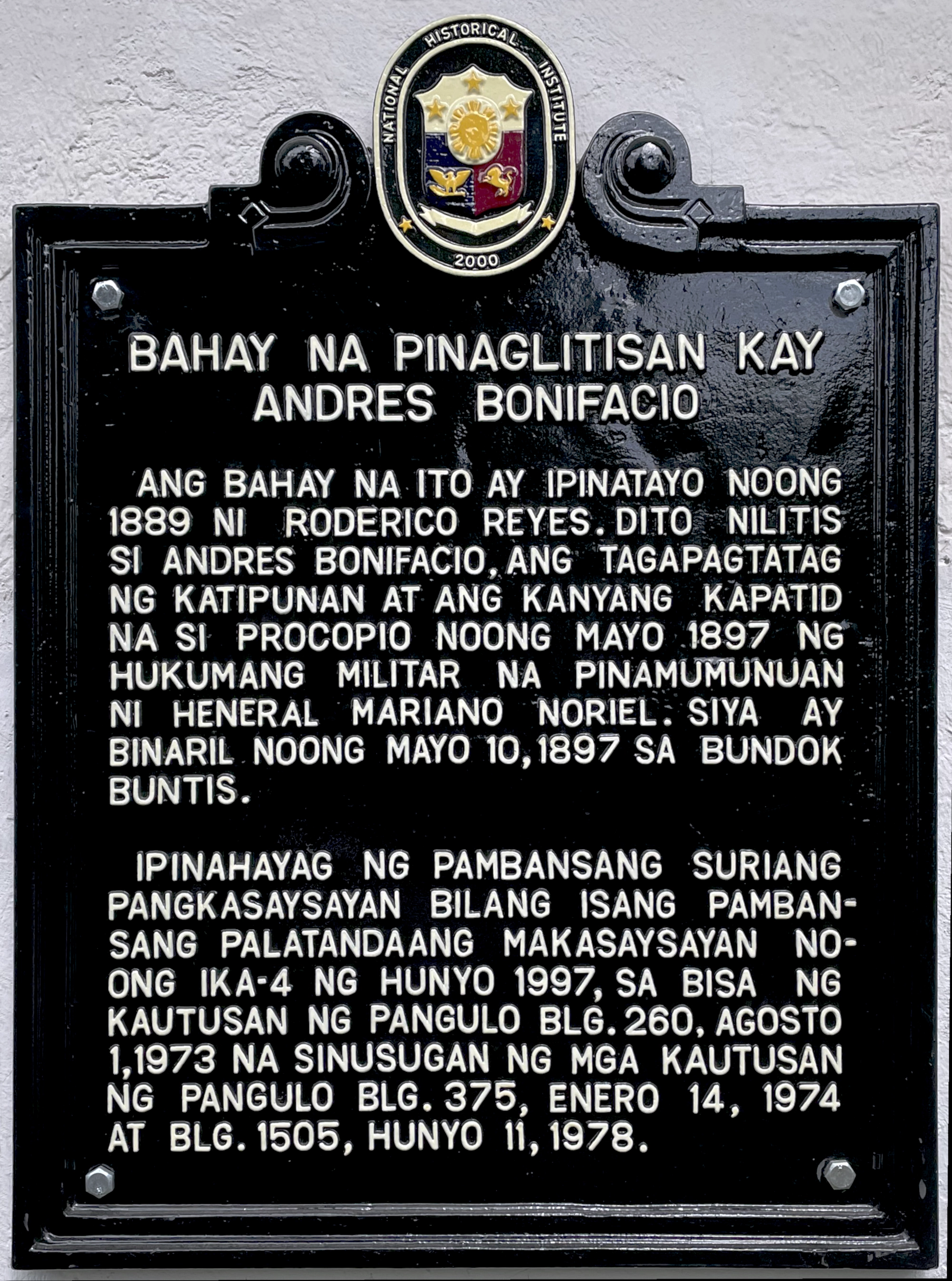
Photo of the 2000 historical marker

Where Bonifacio was Court-Martialled
In this house, erected in 1889, by its owner, Teodorico Reyes, Andres Bonifacio, founder of the Katipunan, was tried with his brother, Procopio, May 1897, by a court-martial headed by Brigadier-General Mariano Noriel. He was shot, May 10, 1897, at Mt. Buntis.

Bahay na Pinaglitisan kay Andres Bonifacio	House where Andres Bonifacio was Tried
Ang bahay na ito ay ipinatayo noong 1889 ni Teodorico Reyes. Dito nilitis si Andres Bonifacio, ang tagapagtatag ng Katipunan at ang kanyang kapatid na si Procopio noong Mayo 1897 ng hukumang militar na pinamumunuan ni Heneral Mariano Noriel. Siya ay binaril noong Mayo 10, 1897 sa Bundok Buntis. Ipinahayag ng Pambansang Suriang Pangkasaysayan bilang isang Pambansang Palatandaang Makasaysayan noong ika-4 ng Hunyo 1997, sa bisa ng Kautusan ng Pangulo Blg. 260, Agosto 1, 1973 na sinusugan ng mga Kautusan ng Pangulo Blg. 375, Enero 14, 1974 at Blg. 1505, Hunyo 11, 1978.	This house was erected in 1889 by Teodorico Reyes. This was where Andres Bonifacio, the founder of the Katipunan, and his brother Procopio was tried in May 1897 by a court-martial headed by General Mariano Noriel. He was shot on May 10, 1897, at Mount Buntis. Declared by the National Historical Institute as a National Historical Landmark on 4 June 1997, by virtue of Presidential Decree No. 260, August 1, 1973, as amended by Presidential Decree No. 375, January 14, 1974, and No. 1505, July 11, 1978.
