= Casa Villavicencio =

Colonial Era house in Batangas, Philippines

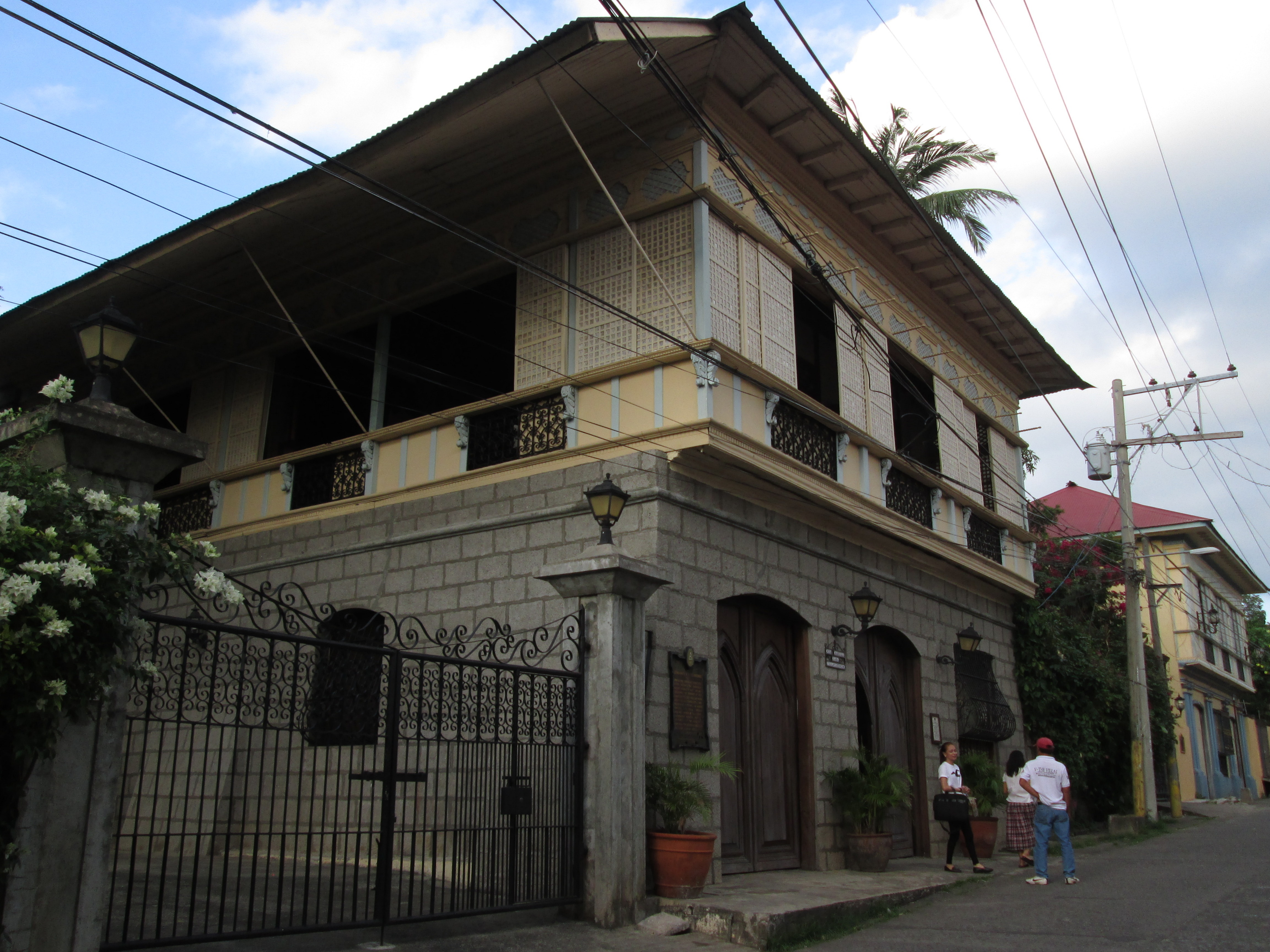
- The facade of Casa Villavicencio facing Gliceria Marella Street

General information
- Type: Museum and Residence
- Architectural style: Bahay na Bato
- Location: Gliceria Marella Street cor. Del Castillo Street, Taal, Batangas, Taal, Philippines
- Coordinates: 13.880313°N 120.921186°E
- Owner: Villavicencio Family

Technical details
- Material: Adobe, and Wood

The Casa Villavicencio or Casa V is a Spanish Colonial Era house in Taal, Batangas, Philippines. Built in 1850, Don Eulalio Villavicencio inherited the house upon the death of his parents. In 1919, Governor General Francis B. Harrison slept in the house as a guest of Sen. Vicente Ilustre, son-in-law of Doña Gliceria, to inaugurate the electric plant in Taal.

== History ==
In 1850, the parents of Don Eulalio Villavicencio, decided to build a new house with no adjoining neighbors. The new house stood next to what is now the G. Marella Street corner of Del Castillo. Don Eulalio inherited the house upon the death of his parents. He moved to the older but larger dwelling to accommodate his large family. In January 1892, upon the visit of Juan and Antonio Luna to raise funds for the Propaganda Movement, the couple donated P18,000. In gratitude, Juan Luna gifted the couple with portraits.

In 1896, Eulalio was arrested for illegal complicity in the Katipunan and was imprisoned for two years in Fort Santiago. Eulalio died shortly after his release due to the privation suffered during incarceration. The death of her husband led Doña Gliceria to become a nationalist to the extent of holding clandestine meetings in the house with revolutionary leaders of Batangas. She organized the Batalyong Maluya to fight the Spaniards. Doña Gliceria provided food and arms to the revolutionaries. She also generously donated Bulusan, one of her stem ships, to the newly proclaimed Malolos Republic. Converted into a war vessel, it became the first ship of the fledgling Philippine Navy.

During the Philippine–American War, she actively supported the guerrillas under General Malvar. The Americans kept close watch on her, to the extent of posting guards in the adjoining Villavicencio-Marella House.

In 1919. Governor General Francis B. Harrison slept in the house as a guest of Se. Vicente Ilustre, son-in-law of Doña Gliceria, to inaugurate the electric plant in Taal, the first town in Batangas province to produce electricity. In anticipation of the visit, black-and-white Machuca tiles were laid in the zaguan. The original painted canvas ceilings of the formal rooms upstairs were removed and replaced with stamped tin imported from the United States. The walls of the caida and the sala we re-stretchered with new canvass and painted with Art Nouveau motifs by Emilio Alvero. The lot along Del Castillo Street was fences with wrought-iron grilles. A fountain featuring a giant clam shell graced the center of the garden.

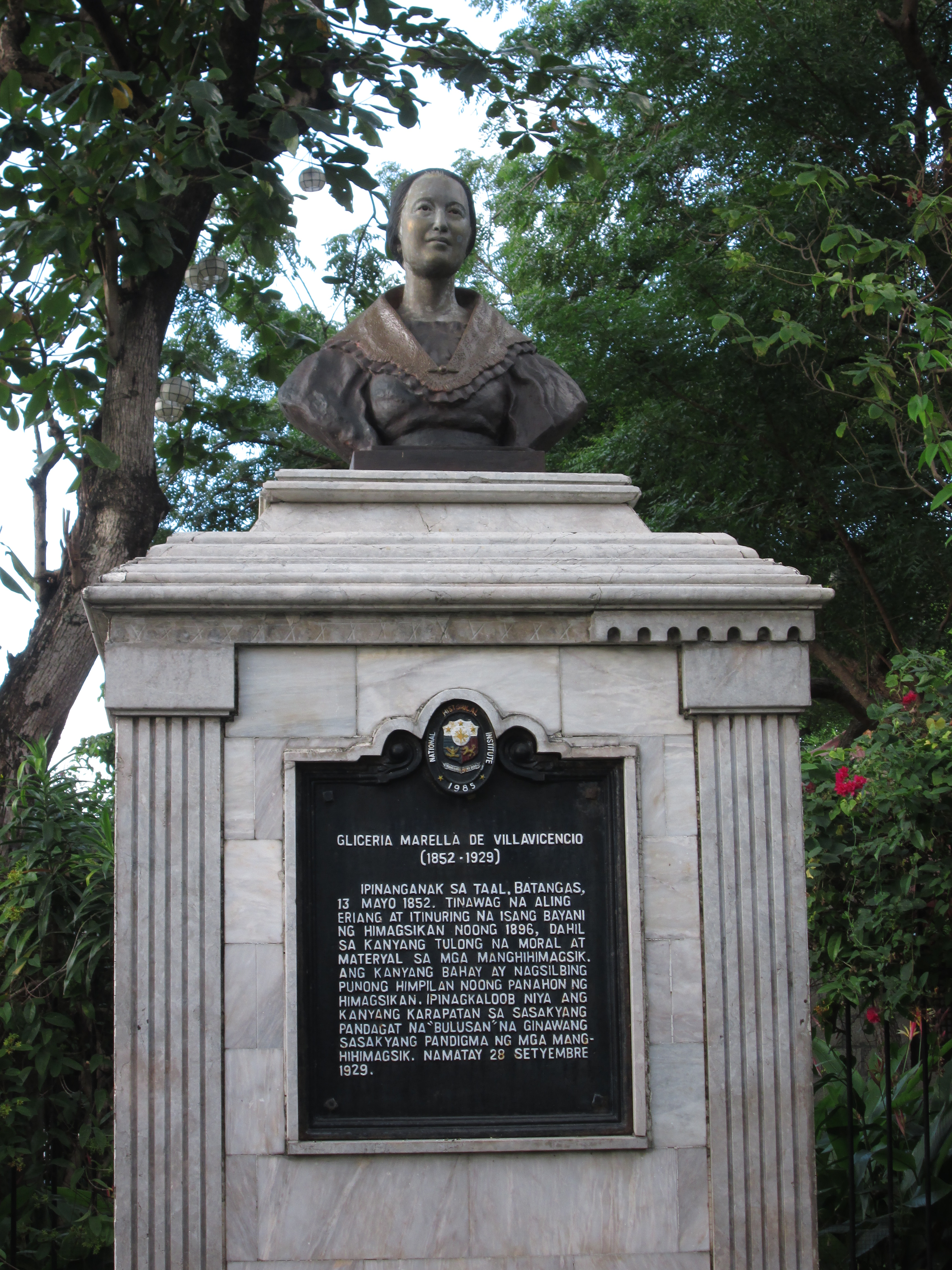
The Gliceria Marella Villavicencio monument next to the house

Like most dwellings in Taal, the house survived the Japanese Occupation relatively unscathed, except for the loss of the floorboards of the large comedor or the dining room that ran the width of the house. The family all lived in Manina after World War II; the house was not occupied for almost half a century.

Upon partition of the communal property in 1990, the house went to the heirs of Don Sixto Villavicencio, Don Eulalio's son. Edgrado Villavicencio, Don Sixto's only son, inherited and began restoring the house. When the monument of Doña Gliceria Marella de Villavicencio was erected by the National Historical Institute, the garden was raised to street level and the fountain was buried under landfill. The covered bridged that used to connect the old house and wedding gift house, which had become decrepit, was demolished.

The house is owned and managed by Edgardo's son, Ernesto Villavicencio with his wife Maria Rosario Benedicto.

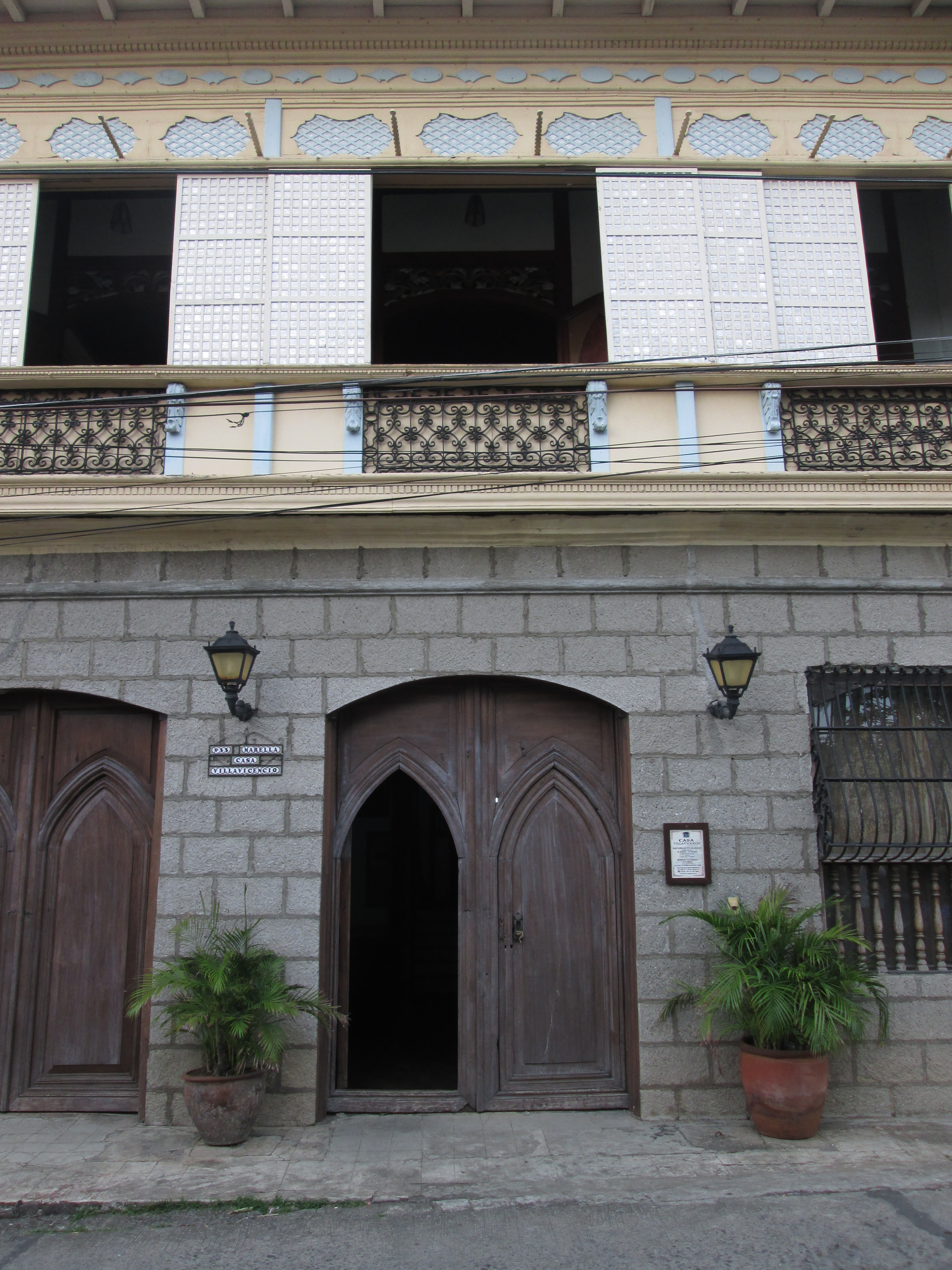
Upper and lower portion of the House

== Architecture and style ==
The house is a typical three-bayed bahay na bato. Its ground-floor walls of adobe blocks support an upper story of carved acanthus consoles of molave seemingly supporting the window sills. The ventanillas or "little windows" beneath the window sill are typical of the 1850s. The ogee arches carved on the doors were inspired by the facade of Bauan Church, where it first appeared in Batangas. The doors of the central bay lead to a short flight of stairs to the meseta (landing) with doors opening to the entresuelo (mezzanine chamber) that had capiz windows opening to the zaguan and a window on the street side with a wrought iron rejas na buntis. From the meseta, a flight of balayong stairs led to the wide caida with its panoramic view of Balayan Bay.

The upper floors are made of hardwood. Elaborately carved and gilded foliated transoms over the double doors carved with ogee panels in the formal rooms and walls and ceilings stretched with handpainted canvas are typical of 1850s Taal houses.
