= Bauan Church =

Roman Catholic church in Batangas, Philippines

- Immaculate Conception Parish Church
- Simbahan ng Inmakulada Konsepsyon ng Bauan (Filipino)
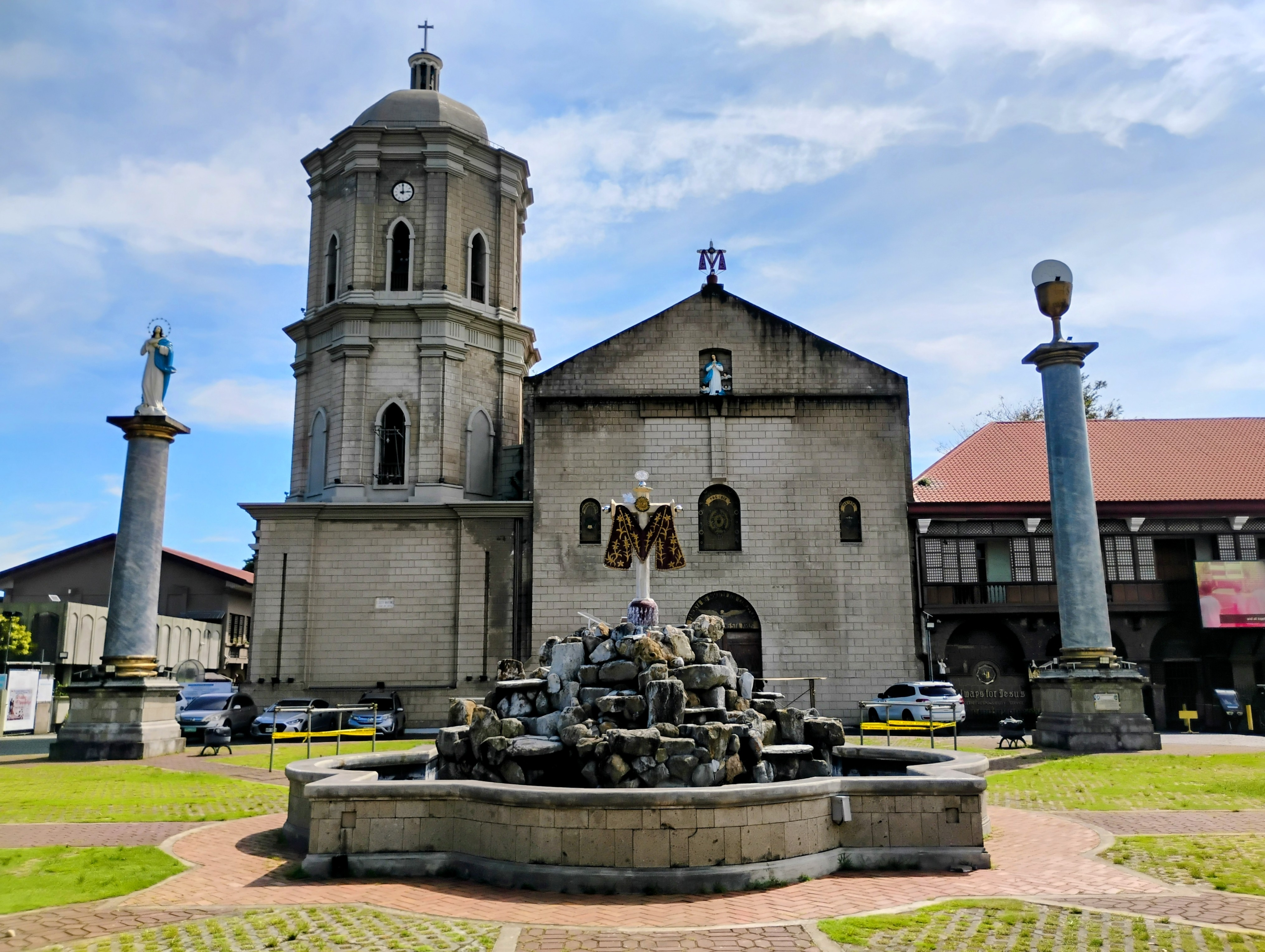
- Church facade in November 2025

- Location in Luzon Location in the Philippines
- 13°47′21″N 121°00′28″E
- Location: Kapitan Ponso Street, Poblacion Bauan, Batangas
- Country: Philippines
- Denomination: Roman Catholic

History
- Status: Parish
- Founded: 1596
- Founder: Augustinians
- Dedication: Immaculate Conception

Architecture
- Functional status: Active
- Architectural type: Church building
- Style: Neo-classic
- Completed: 1894

Administration
- Archdiocese: Lipa

Clergy
- Priest: Fr. Federico Magboo

Immaculate Conception Parish Church, commonly known as Bauan Church, is a Neo-classical church located in Bauan, Batangas, in the Philippines. It is under the jurisdiction of the Archdiocese of Lipa. The church is the third and final relocation site of Bauan after its transfer from the shores of Bombon Lake (Taal Lake), to Durugto, to Lonal, and finally to its present site near the shores of Batangas Bay. The church was also one of the parishes administered by Fr. Manuel Blanco, who perfected the art of dyeing by means of plants in Bauan.

== History ==
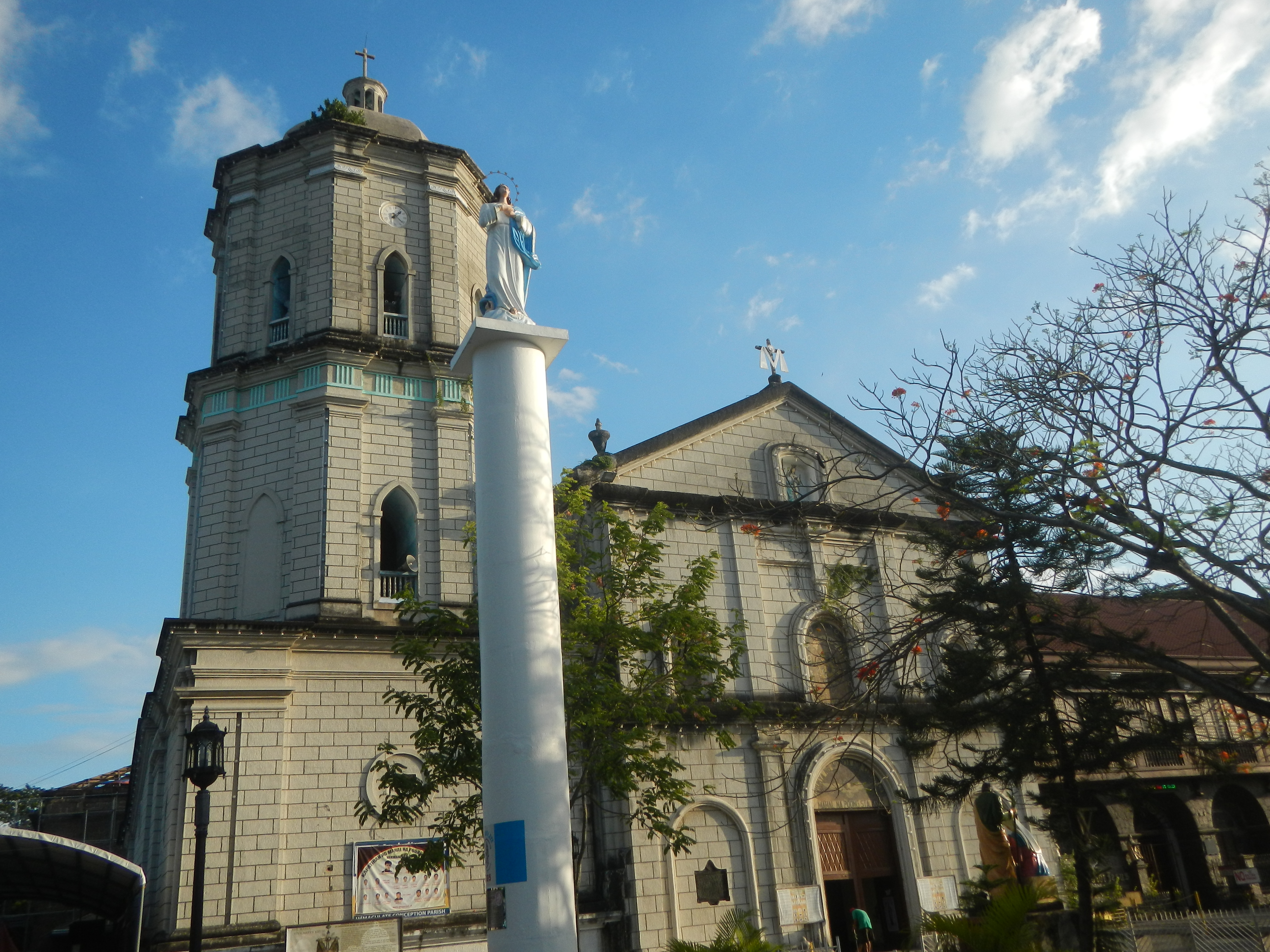
The church in 2018, prior to renovation

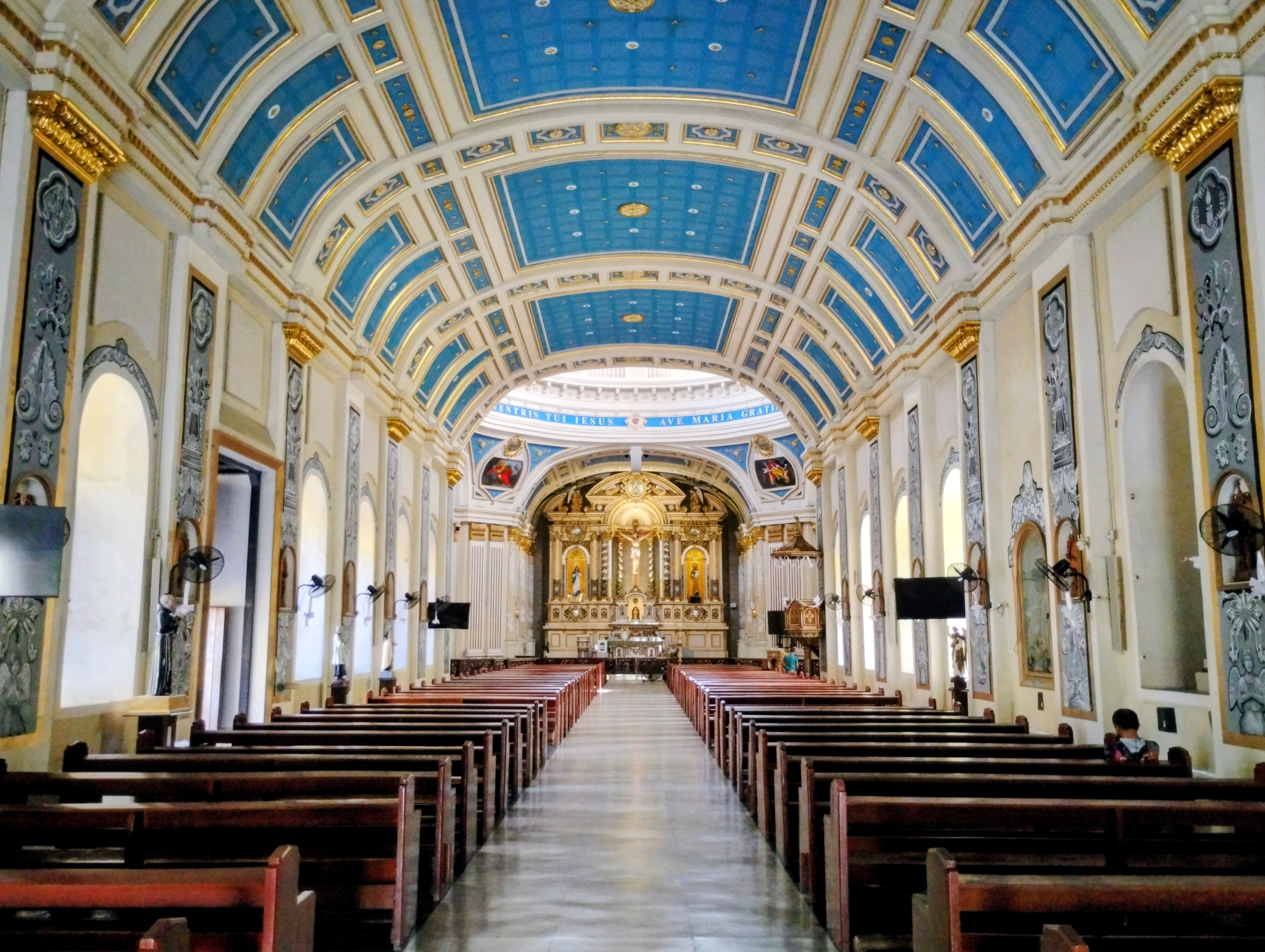
Church interior in 2025

=== Earlier churches ===
The Augustinian Chapter founded Bauan as a visita of Taal, on May 17, 1590. Fr. Diego de Avila, was appointed as the priest in charge of Bauan. On May 12, 1596, Fr. Idelfonso Bernal was appointed prior. In 1660, the town was annexed to Taal because of its insufficient number of "tributos". From its original site in the shores of Bombon river, Fr. Jose Rodriguez relocated the town to a place called Durugto in 1662. Later, Fr. Nicolas Rivera again relocated the town to a place known as Lonal. Fr. Rivera built a church, convent, schools, and a fort, all of strong materials. Finally on 1692, Fr. Simon Martinez, relocated the town in its present site.

=== Present church ===
After the third relocation, Fr. Nicolas Rivera, built a church and convent of strong materials. Both church and convent were damaged by the typhoon of 1694. Fr. Ignacio Mercado, rebuilt them in 1695–97, but again were destroyed. Fr. Blas Vidal started the construction of masonry church in 1700 and was finished in 1710. Fr. Jose Victoria built the present church in 1762, under the direction of Don Juan Bandino. Fr. Hipolito Huerta finished the facade and continued the construction of the transept in 1856. Fr. Felipe Bravo completed it in 1861. Fr. Moises Santos and Felipe Garcia applied the final decorations inside and outside in 1881 and 1894, respectively.

Fr. Jose Treviño built the convent in 1762 and the massive tower attached to the church in 1772. Fr. Alberto Tabores installed a huge bell in 1788. Fr. Manuel del Arco built the stone fence of the atrium in 1848, decorated it with artistic columns and an iron reja. He also built a new convent to replace the one built by Fr. Jose Treviño. Both tower and choir loft were destroyed in 1870 and were repaired in 1874 and a new clock was installed.

==== 2021 renovation ====
The exterior and interior of the church underwent a thorough renovation beginning in 2021 following damage incurred from a 2017 earthquake. The initial renovation left the facade without its neoclassical elements, significantly altering the appearance the church gained in 1894. Renovations to the interior replaced the flat ceiling with an arched one, and new fixtures, paintings and altars were also installed. Rubble from the renovation of the façade appears to have been refashioned into a fountain which now sits in front of the church. The "stripping" of the façade went viral in 2021 and drew skepticism from the National Historical Commission of the Philippines (NHCP).

In response, officials of the Bauan parish stated that the "stripping" of the façade was a temporary measure, with further alterations forthcoming. As of 2025, the façade remains mostly unadorned; several proposed redesigns have been rejected by the NHCP.

=== Devotion to the Holy Cross of Bauan ===
The church houses the Holy Cross of Bauan, the patron saint of the town. Found in 1595 by local natives in a place called Dingin, near Alitagtag, it was installed in Bauan's church. Made of anubing (Artocarpus cumingiana) wood, it is 2.5 metres (8.2 ft) high with a 1 metre (3.3 ft) crosspiece. A golden sun, with radiating rays and embossed with a human face, was added at the point where the cross's arms intersect.
