= Severino de las Alas =

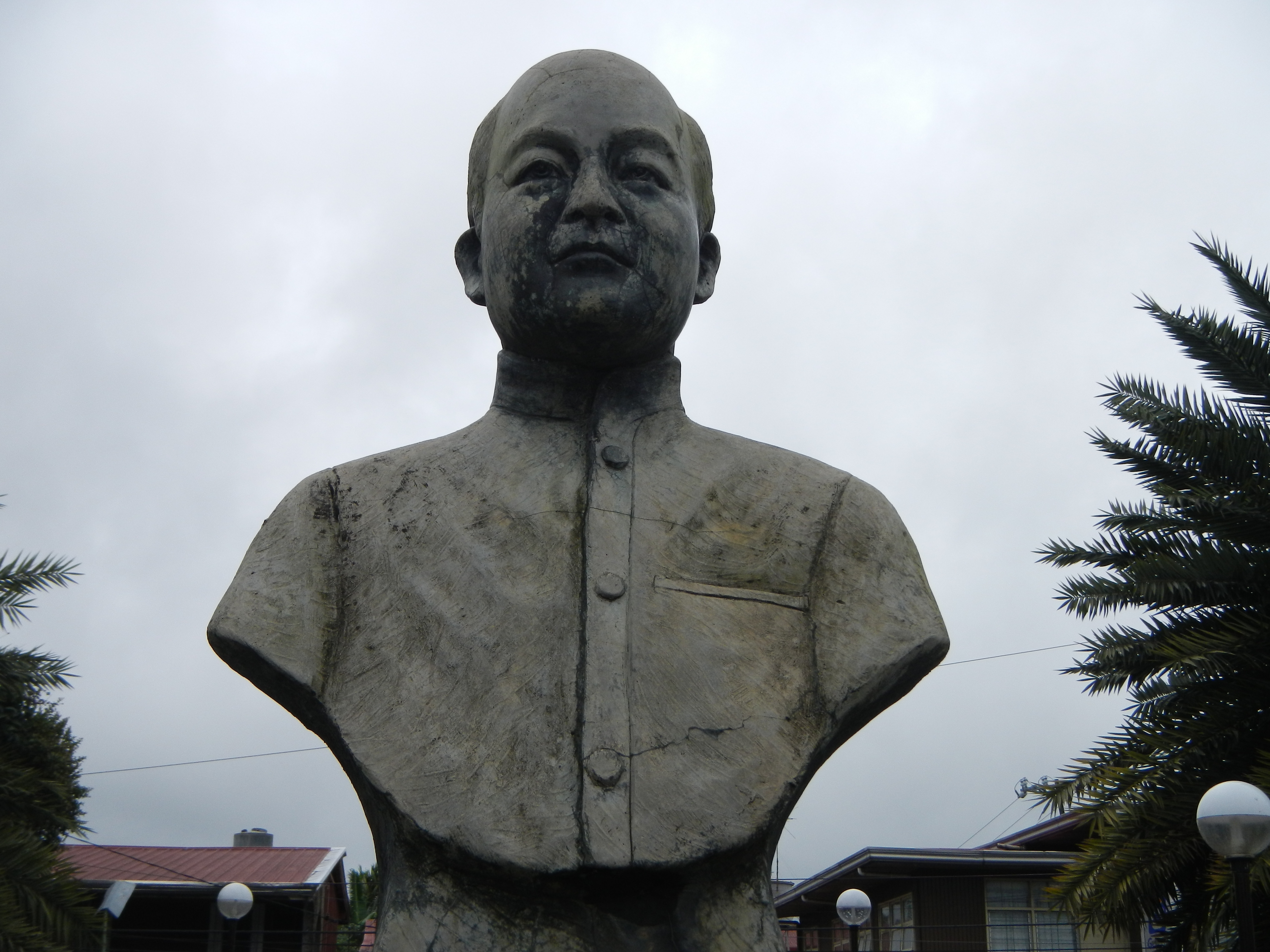
Bust of Severino de las Alas in Indang, Cavite

Severino de las Alas (January 8, 1851 – November 4, 1918) was an educator, lawyer, politician, and philanthropist who served as Secretary of the Interior during the First Philippine Republic. He was born in Indang, Cavite, and attended the Colegio de San Juan de Letran. He obtained his law degree from the University of Santo Tomas.

He was a Kagawad at the Tejeros Convention on March 22, 1897, and one of the signatories of the Biyak-na-Bato constitution. He was appointed Secretary of the Interior in Pedro Paterno's cabinet on May 7, 1899. From 1899 to 1901, he led the guerrilla forces in Cavite. He served two consecutive terms as Municipal President (Mayor) of Indang (1906-1909 and 1909-1912).

During the Philippine Revolution, de las Alas supported Andres Bonifacio and was a member of the Magdiwang faction. However, they had a falling out when de las Alas criticized the former Supremo.When Bonifacio issued threats to de las Alas, Indang residents wrote to Emilio Aguinaldo to order Bonifacio's arrest.

He was an educator who taught at schools in Manila and Indang.

As a philanthropist, he donated a significant portion of his landholdings (70 hectares) to Indang Intermediate School. To recognize his contribution, the school was renamed the Don Severino National Agriculture School. In 1964, by virtue of Republic Act 3917, authored by Congressman Justiniano Montano Sr., the school became a state college and was renamed Don Severino Agricultural College. Currently, the school is the main campus of Cavite State University (Severino de las Alas campus).

He died in Indang on November 4, 1918.
