= Nuestra Señora de Candelaria Parish Church (Mabitac) =

Roman Catholic church in Laguna, Philippines

Mabitac Church
- Nuestra Señora de Candelaria Parish Church
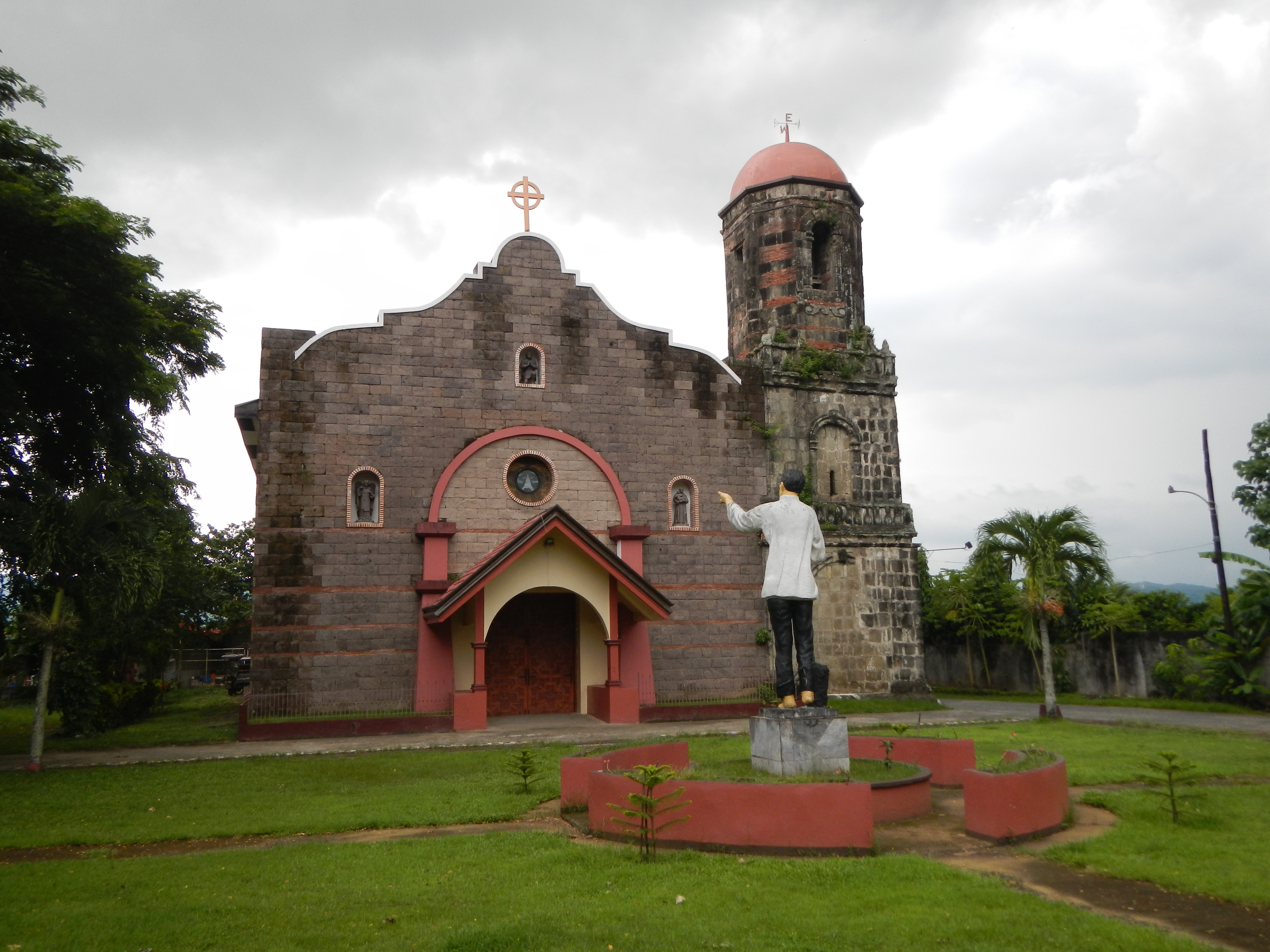
- Church facade in 2013

- Location in Laguna Location in Luzon Location in the Philippines
- 14°25′31″N 121°25′34″E
- Location: Mabitac, Laguna
- Country: Philippines
- Denomination: Roman Catholic

History
- Status: Parish

Architecture
- Functional status: Active
- Architectural type: Church building

Specifications
- Materials: Adobe stones

Administration
- Province: Manila
- Metropolis: Manila
- Archdiocese: Manila
- Diocese: San Pablo
- Deanery: Sts. Peter and Paul

Clergy
- Priest: Ernani Carillo

The Nuestra Señora de Candelaria Parish Church, informally known as Mabitac Church, is a Roman Catholic church located above Calvary or Kalbaryo Hill in Mabitac, Laguna, Philippines. It is under the jurisdiction of the Diocese of San Pablo. Its church is known for having a staircase of 126 steps, a panoramic view of the town of Sta. Maria and Laguna de Bay, and the festivity of the Three Kings every January 6, a re-enactment of the Magi's journey.

== History ==
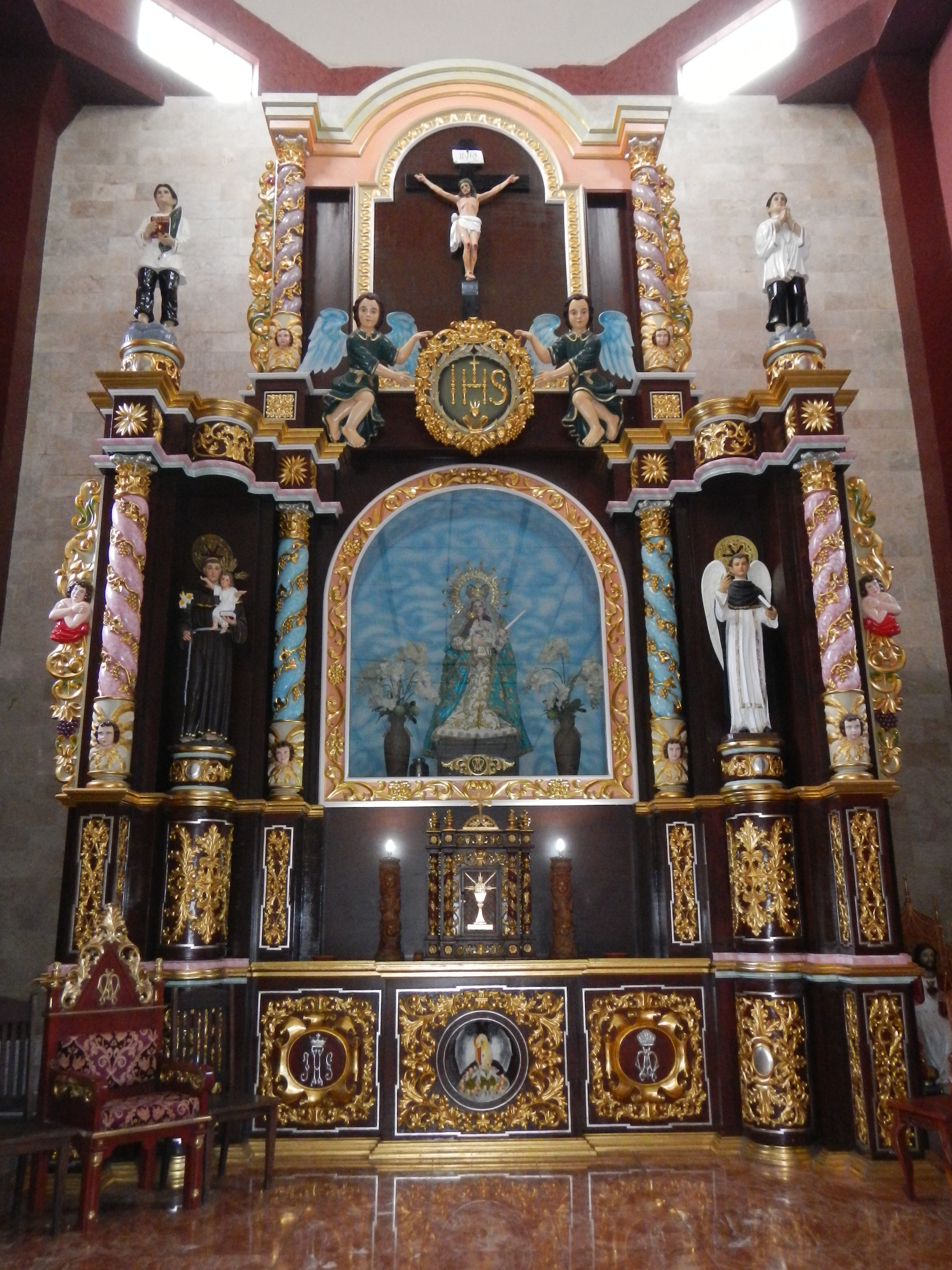
The Nuestra Señora de Candelaria enshrined in the central niche of the retablo mayor

Mabitac was under the patronage of Nuestra Señora de Candelaria or the Our Lady of Candles. The image of Nuestra Señora de Candelaria was commissioned between 1599 and 1600 by the alferez, Don Cristobal Mercado for Paco Church. After three years, in 1603, it was first brought to a hospital-chapel in Los Baños. It was transferred to Siniloan in 1615 upon the request of Father Juan Miguel de Talavera to his superior, Father Blas de la Madre de Dios. His plan was to place it on a little mount between Inaguasan and Galoy, two barrios of Siniloan, in aid of unification around his place. The people of Mabitac sought the image to be placed in Mabitac and was enthroned to their town in that same year.

The first church of Mabitac was the aforementioned church between the two barrios of Siniloan. Due to flooding, the Franciscans transferred the church on top of Calvary or Kalbaryo Hill in 1618 and made it out of stone. Originally, the church only had 96 steps but further improvements increased it to more than 120 steps. It was seriously damaged during the 1880 earthquake and repaired under the supervision of Father Antonio de la Fuente and again severely damaged during the 1937 earthquake.

== Features ==
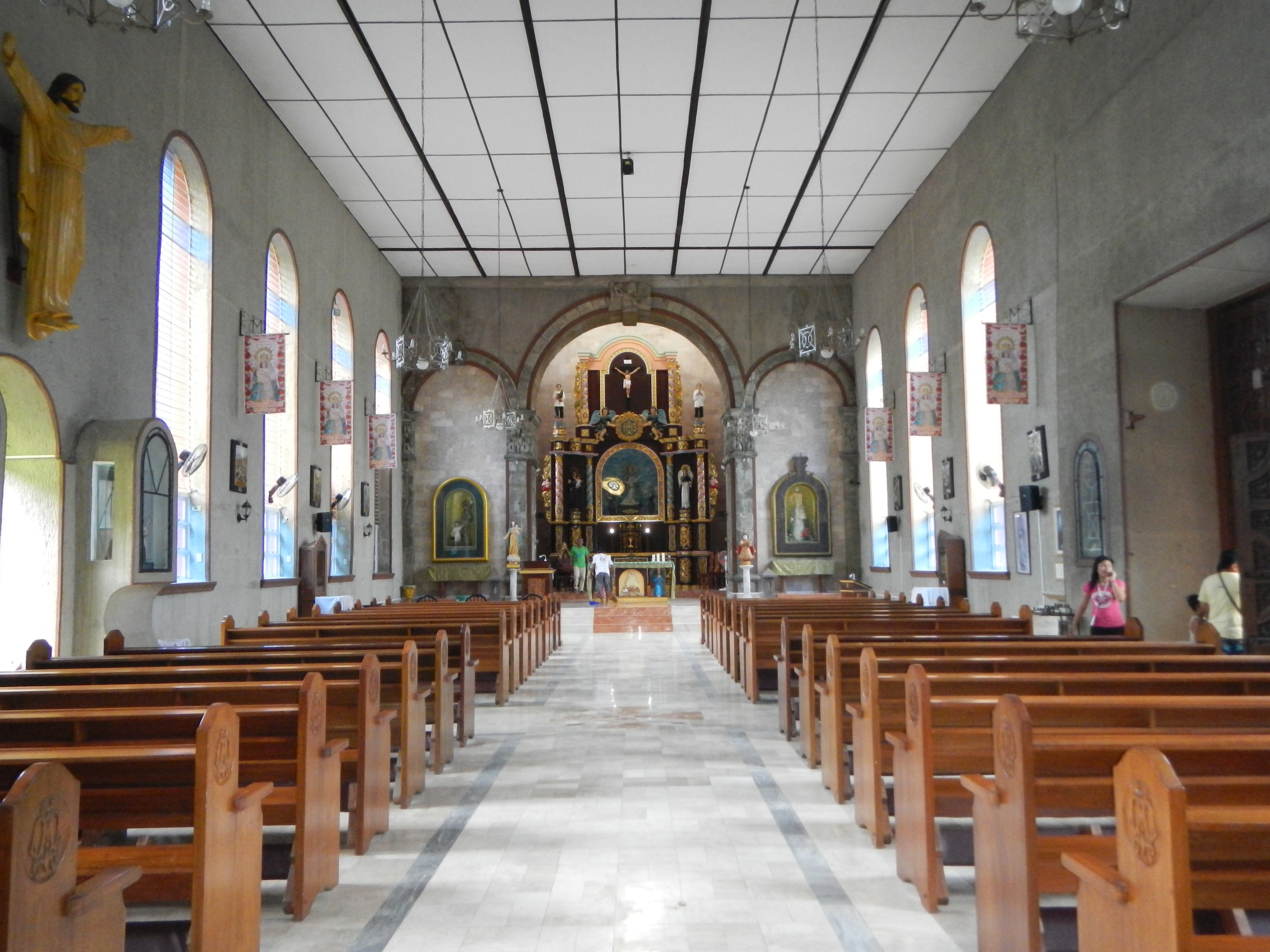
Church interior in 2013

The church is known for its 126 steps connecting the local road to the main church on top of the hill. It has a Spanish style façade. Due to natural calamities and war, only the belfry connected to the church is the remaining original structure of the original 1618 church.

== Bibliography ==
- Huerta, Felix de (1865). Estado geográfico, topográfico, estadístico, histórico-religioso. Binondo: Imprenta de M. Sanchez y Ca. pp. 146–149.
- Historical Markers: Regions I-IV and CAR. Manila: National Historical Institute (Philippines). 1993. p. 68. ISBN 9715380611.
