= List of Cultural Properties of the Philippines in Calabarzon =

This list contains an overview of the government recognized Cultural Properties of the Philippines in Calabarzon. The list is based on the official lists provided by the National Commission on Culture and the Arts, National Historical Commission of the Philippines and the National Museum of the Philippines.

Cultural Property wmph identifier (Note: wmph is an internal identifier used by Wikimedia Philippines to identify the monument. This is not an official identifier, and only shown temporarily in the templates until the government creates an updated complete list.)	Site name	Description	Province	City or municipality	Address	Coordinates	Image
PH-40-0001	Luz-Katigbak House	Also known as Casa de Segunda, this ancestral house was built in the 1880s by Segunda Katigbak and her husband Manuel Metra Luz. Katigbak is mentioned as the first love of Rizal in his biography.	Batangas	Lipa	198 Rizal St.	13°56′19″N 121°09′43″E	Upload file
PH-40-0002	Punta de Malabrigo Lighthouse	The lighthouse, originally equipped with a 3rd-order Fresnel light, have been actively guiding ships plying the Verde Island Passage since 1896.	Batangas	Lobo	Lobo-Malabrigo Rd.	13°35′56″N 121°15′46″E	Upload file
PH-40-0003	Jose P. Laurel Monument	The monument of Jose P. Laurel, president of the Second Philippine Republic, is a designated National Historical Landmark.	Batangas	Santo Tomas	Junction of Pan-Philippine Highway and General Malvar Ave.	14°06′51″N 121°08′31″E	Upload file
PH-40-0004	Miguel Malvar Monument	The shrine in front of the municipal hall in honor of Sto. Tomas native Miguel Malvar, a revolutionary hero during the Philippine revolution and the Philippine–American War.	Batangas	Santo Tomas	Sto. Tomas Municipal Hall Rd.	14°06′37″N 121°08′34″E	Upload file
PH-40-0005	Marcela Agoncillo House	This is the birthplace of Marcela Agoncillo, the maker of the first Philippine flag. The house contains memorabilia and the evolution of the Philippine flag display.	Batangas	Taal	Calle Marcela Mariño Agoncillo	13°52′42″N 120°55′05″E	Upload file
PH-40-0006	Goco Ancestral House	The heritage house was built in 1876 by the family of Juan Cabrera Goco and restored in 1999.	Batangas	Taal			Upload file
PH-40-0007	Taal Historical Landmark		Batangas	Taal		13°52′48″N 120°55′22″E	Upload file
PH-40-0008	Ylagan-de la Rosa House	The house of a popular lawyer and educator in the 19th century, it was restored by the descendants of the family between 1995 and 1997. It is currently a private home.	Batangas	Taal	Calle Jose P. Rizal	13°52′41″N 120°55′29″E	Upload file
PH-40-0009	Apolinario Mabini Shrine	Birthplace and resting place of Apolinario Mabini, a patriot and hero of the Philippine Revolution.	Batangas	Tanauan	Talisay-Tanuan Rd.	14°06′05″N 121°05′58″E	Upload file
PH-40-0010	Balayan Church	The present church of the Immaculate Conception was constructed in 1748, at that time, by the Jesuits.	Batangas	Balayan	Plaza Mabini St.	13°56′17″N 120°43′43″E	Upload file
PH-40-0011	Bauan Church	The Parish Church of the Immaculate Conception was built by the Augustinians in the 18th century and remodeled by the 19th century.	Batangas	Bauan	Kap Ponso St.	13°47′22″N 121°00′28″E	Upload file
PH-40-0012	Ibaan Church	Construction of the present St. James the Greater Parish Church was started in 1854 by the Augustinians and completed 1869, fifteen years later.	Batangas	Ibaan	Lipa-Ibaan Rd.	13°49′08″N 121°07′58″E	Upload file
PH-40-0013	Lipa Cathedral	The San Sebastian Cathedral is the seat of the Archdiocese of Lipa.	Batangas	Lipa	L. Katigbak St.	13°56′27″N 121°09′49″E	Upload file
PH-40-0014	San Jose Church	The present St. Joseph Parish Church was constructed in 1812 under the leadership of famous botanist Francisco Manuel Blanco of the Augustinian order.	Batangas	San Jose	Makalintal Ave.	13°52′47″N 121°06′15″E	Upload file
PH-40-0015	San Juan Church	The present Church of Saint John Nepomucene was built between 1890 and 1894 after the previous church got flooded in 1863.	Batangas	San Juan	Burgos St.	13°49′43″N 121°23′39″E	Upload file
PH-40-0016	Escuela Pia	The building of the Pious School for the poor & orphans of Taal was constructed in 1885.	Batangas	Taal	Calle Jose W. Diokno	13°52′50″N 120°55′25″E	More images
PH-40-0017	Apacible House	The house of Leon Apacible, a delegate to the Malolos Congress, was built in the 18th century. During the 1890s this house became a meeting place for the resistance leaders in the community.	Batangas	Taal	Calle Marcela Mariño Agoncillo	13°52′46″N 120°55′11″E	Upload file
PH-40-0018	Taal Basilica	The present Basilica of Saint Martin of Tours, constructed in 1856, is allegedly the largest church in the Far East.	Batangas	Taal	Calle Camilo Ilagan	13°52′50″N 120°55′29″E	Upload file
PH-40-0019	Tanauan Church	The church was moved to the present location after the 1754 eruption of Taal Volcano. The present Church of St. John the Baptist was constructed in 1881.	Batangas	Tanauan	F. Laurena St.	14°05′10″N 121°09′13″E	Upload file
PH-40-0020	Fort San Felipe Historical Site		Cavite	Cavite City		14°28′55″N 120°55′00″E	Upload file
PH-40-0021	Corregidor	A heavily fortified island at the entrance of Manila Bay; site of heavy battles during World War II	Cavite	Cavite City	Entrance of Manila Bay	14°22′50″N 120°34′32″E	Upload file
PH-40-0022	Sarayba House	Built in the late 18th century, the houses exemplifies the architecture during the Spanish era. It was the home of Maria Dolores Gomes-Trias, sister of Fr. Gomes, one of the martyred priest of the 1872 Cavite mutiny.	Cavite	General Trias			Upload Photo
PH-40-0023	Site of the Battle of Imus	The former site of the Estate House (Casa Hacienda de Imus) of the Recollects, now the Imus Cuartel (Barracks) of the Cavite Provincial Police.	Cavite	Imus	General E. Topacio St.	14°25′47″N 120°56′25″E	More images
PH-40-0024	Battle of Alapan site	Site of the battle on May 28, 1898, that led to a Filipino victory and the first unfurling of the Philippine flag.	Cavite	Imus	Alapan St.	14°24′56″N 120°55′07″E	Upload file
PH-40-0025	Aguinaldo Shrine	House of Emilio Aguinaldo, the first president of the Philippines, and site of the Philippine Declaration of Independence on June 12, 1898	Cavite	Kawit	Tirona Highway	14°26′42″N 120°54′25″E	More images
PH-40-0026	Baldomero Aguinaldo Shrine	House of the Magdalo faction leader of the Katipunan and cousin of Emilio Aguinaldo	Cavite	Kawit	Bisita St.	14°26′52″N 120°55′25″E	Upload file
PH-40-0027	Bonifacio Trial House	The house of Teodorico Reyes where the controversial trial of Andres Bonifacio was held in May 1897.	Cavite	Maragondon	Colonel C. Riel St.	14°16′27″N 120°44′13″E	More images
PH-40-0028	Casa Hacienda and its Environs (Site of the Tejeros Convention)	Former site of the Augustinian Estate House; Site of the historic March 22, 1897 Tejeros Convention	Cavite	Rosario	General Trias Drive	14°24′04″N 120°51′38″E	More images
PH-40-0029	Santa Cruz Parish Convent	On March 23, 1897, Emilio Aguinaldo and Mariano Trias took their oaths at this convent as president and vice-president of the revolutionary government.	Cavite	Tanza	San Agustin St.	14°24′03″N 120°51′25″E	Upload file
PH-40-0030	Sta. Maria Magdalena Parish	The Spanish colonial Parish Church of Amadeo was used as a Japanese garrison during World War II.	Cavite	Amadeo	F. Laviña St.	14°10′13″N 120°55′18″E	Upload file
PH-40-0031	Cañacao Navy Hospital	A naval hospital established by the Spaniards in 1871 and managed by the Sisters of Charity, which the Americans took over during their occupation of the country. It was destroyed in 1942 during World War II.	Cavite	Cavite City			Upload Photo
PH-40-0032	Astronomical Observatory of Cavite		Cavite	Cavite City			Upload Photo
PH-40-0033	Astronomical Observatory of Joseph Lepaute D’Agelet	A temporary observatory at the garden of the Cavite commandant was set up by the French astronomer and member of the Lapérouse expedition during the expedition's stop in the city from February 28 to April 10, 1787.	Cavite	Cavite City	Jurado St.		Upload Photo
PH-40-0034	Ermita de Porta Vaga	The original shrine of Our Lady of Solitude of Porta Vaga, the patron saint of the province of Cavite that was destroyed in World War II.	Cavite	Cavite City	Plaza Soledad St.	14°28′57″N 120°54′33″E	More images
PH-40-0035	Ladislao Diwa Elementary School	The Caridad Elementary School was renamed Ladislao Diwa Elementary School in November 1964 in honor of Ladislao Diwa, one of the founders of Katipunan.	Cavite	Cavite City	P. Burgos Avenue	14°28′37″N 120°53′32″E	Upload Photo
PH-40-0036	Cavite National High School	The former Cavite High School was established in 1902, and is considered as one of the oldest national secondary schools in the country.	Cavite	Cavite City	Garcia St.	14°28′59″N 120°53′51″E	Upload file
PH-40-0037	Fort San Felipe	The quadrilateral fort with four bastions at each corner was constructed between 1609 and 1616. Only two bastions and one wall remains after the stronghold was demolished during the early American Colonial period.	Cavite	Cavite City (Cavite Naval Base)	Jurado St.	14°28′55″N 120°55′00″E	Upload Photo
PH-40-0038	Plaza Olivia Salamanca		Cavite	Cavite City			Upload Photo
PH-40-0039	Dasmariñas Church	The Immaculate Conception Parish Church, constructed in the 19th century, was the site of bloodshed when several revolutionists were defeated and killed in the church and convent.	Cavite	Dasmariñas	Don Placido Campos Ave.	14°19′37″N 120°56′10″E	Upload file
PH-40-0040	General Trias Church	The Church of St. Francis of Assisi was erected by the Franciscans in 1769.	Cavite	General Trias		14°23′08″N 120°52′48″E	Upload file
PH-40-0041	Tomas Mascardo Bridge	Commonly known as the Imus Toll Bridge	Cavite	Imus	Aguinaldo Highway	14°25′27″N 120°56′34″E	Upload file
PH-40-0042	Tirona House		Cavite	Imus	12 Maestro G. Tirona St.		Upload Photo
PH-40-0043	Imus Cathedral	Parish church of Imus built around 1821 by Fr. Nicolas Becerra of the Recollects; and a place of combat during the Battle of Imus	Cavite	Imus	Gen. Castañeda St.	14°25′47″N 120°56′10″E	More images
PH-40-0044	Imus Arsenal	Site of the revolutionists' arsenal headed by Filipino-Chinese blacksmith, later general, Jose Ignacio Paua	Cavite	Imus	Corner of Gen. E. Topacio and Capt. B. Paredes Sts.		Upload file
PH-40-0045	Bridge of Isabel II	Built by the Recollects during the Spanish era, it was the site of the Battle of Imus on September 3, 1896, during which a span was dismantled by Aguinaldo and his men to trap the marching Spanish troops.	Cavite	Imus	Gen. E. Topacio St.	14°25′49″N 120°56′25″E	More images
PH-40-0046	Pilar Lodge Building F & AM		Cavite	Imus (Municipal Hall)	Maestro G. Tirona St.	14°25′43″N 120°56′10″E	Upload file
PH-40-0047	Kawit Church	The present Church of St. Mary Magdalene was constructed 1737. In 1899 during the Philippine–American War, it was bombed by the Americans, targeting the Filipino leaders using the church for protection.	Cavite	Kawit	Tanggulan St.	14°26′41″N 120°54′13″E	More images
PH-40-0048	Kawit Municipal Hall	Site of the former municipal hall captured by Emilio Aguinaldo and Candido Tirona on August 31, 1896, that eventually started the revolution in Cavite.	Cavite	Kawit	Tirona Highway	14°26′39″N 120°54′12″E	More images
PH-40-0049	Maragondon Church	The Parish Church of the Assumption of Our Lady in Marogondon was constructed in the early 18th century by the Jesuits, with later additions by the seculars and the Augustinian Recollects. The church was designated as a National Cultural Treasure by the National Museum of the Philippines.	Cavite	Maragondon	Colonel C. Riel St	14°16′26″N 120°44′01″E	More images
PH-40-0050	Casa Hacienda de Naic	The former Estate House (Casa Hacienda) of the Dominicans is now the present Naic Elementary School.	Cavite	Naic	Rizal St.	14°19′14″N 120°45′49″E	Upload file
PH-40-0051	Emilio Aguinaldo Monument	Monument of Aguinaldo at the Tejeros Convention site	Cavite	Rosario	Gen Trias Dr.	14°24′04″N 120°51′39″E	Upload file
PH-40-0052	Silang Church	Constructed in 1640	Cavite	Silang	J. Rizal St.	14°13′26″N 120°58′28″E	Upload file
PH-40-0053	Rizal Shrine	Birthplace of Jose Rizal, national hero of the Philippines	Laguna	Calamba	J.P. Rizal St.	14°12′49″N 121°10′00″E	Upload file
PH-40-0054	Calamba Church	St. John the Baptist Parish Church	Laguna	Calamba	J.P. Rizal St.	14°12′49″N 121°10′03″E	Upload file
PH-40-0055	Paciano Rizal Shrine	Locate along the shore of Laguna de Bay, it is the house and tomb of Paciano Rizal.	Laguna	Los Baños		14°10′54″N 121°13′26″E	More images
PH-40-0056	Nagcarlan Underground Cemetery		Laguna	Nagcarlan			Upload file
PH-40-0057	Pila Historical Landmark	The historic town center of Pila was declared as a National Historical Landmark on May 17, 2000.	Laguna	Pila		14°14′04″N 121°21′51″E	Upload file
PH-40-0058	Cuartel de Santo Domingo	Built in 1877 as barracks (cuartel) of the police force (Guardia Civil) on the former Estate of the Dominicans	Laguna	Santa Rosa	Santa Rosa-Tagaytay Rd	14°13′50″N 121°03′00″E	Upload file
PH-40-0059	Bay Church	The first stone St. Augustine Church was built in 1804 but was destroyed during WWII. The present church was completed in 1953.	Laguna	Bay	J.P. Rizal Ave.	14°10′50″N 121°17′03″E	Upload file
PH-40-0060	Jose Rizal Monument		Laguna	Calamba	Bacnotan Road		Upload Photo
PH-40-0061	Cavinti Church	The Church of the Transfiguration	Laguna	Cavinti	Oliveros St	14°14′42″N 121°30′27″E	Upload file
PH-40-0062	Lilio (Liliw) Church		Laguna	Liliw			Upload file
PH-40-0063	Los Baños Church	Church of the Immaculate Conception	Laguna	Los Baños		14°10′44″N 121°13′19″E	Upload file
PH-40-0064	Hospital de Aguas Santos		Laguna	Los Baños			Upload Photo
PH-40-0065	International Rice Research Institute (IRRI)	A rice research and training organization formed in 1960 to develop new rice varieties and rice crop management techniques to find sustainable "green" ways to improve the well-being of poor rice farmers and consumers.	Laguna	Los Baños	National Highway	14°10′11″N 121°15′30″E	Upload file
PH-40-0066	Baker Memorial Hall	Used by the Japanese as an internment camp for captured American and Filipino soldiers during World War II.	Laguna	Los Baños	Mangga St. (Mariano Mondenado Ave.)	14°09′42″N 121°14′34″E	Upload file
PH-40-0067	Lumban Church	St. Sebastian Parish Church	Laguna	Lumban	J.P. Rizal St.	14°17′51″N 121°27′34″E	Upload file
PH-40-0068	Mabitac Church		Laguna	Mabitac		14°25′42″N 121°25′34″E	Upload file
PH-40-0069	Majayjay Church	St. Gregory the Great Parish Church	Laguna	Majayjay	Lopez Jaena St.	14°08′47″N 121°28′17″E	Upload file
PH-40-0070	Nagcarlan Church	St. Bartholomew Parish Church	Laguna	Nagcarlan			Upload file
PH-40-0071	Paete Church	St. James the Apostle Parish Church	Laguna	Paete	Ed Reyes St.	14°21′52″N 121°28′54″E	Upload file
PH-40-0072	Pagsanjan Church	Our Lady of Guadalupe Church of Pagsanjan or the Diocesan Shrine of Our Lady of the Guadalupe	Laguna	Pagsanjan	General Taino St.	14°16′22″N 121°27′22″E	Upload file
PH-40-0073	Pagsanjan Municipal Building	The building was originally constructed in mid 19th century housing the Tribunal del Gremio de Naturales and became the first public elementary school in Pagsanjan from 1864–1911.	Laguna	Pagsanjan	National Hway cor General Taino St.	14°16′21″N 121°27′21″E	Upload file
PH-40-0074	Pakil Church	St. Peter of Alcantara Parish Church; Shrine of Our Lady of Sorrows of Turumba	Laguna	Pakil	Tavera St.	14°22′51″N 121°28′44″E	More images
PH-40-0075	Pila Church	The Parish Church of St. Anthony of Padua was constructed in the early 19th century after the previous church was frequently flooded in its old location. The convent was completed in 1849. Both were seriously damaged by the Luzon earthquakes of 1880.	Laguna	Pila	San Antonio St.	14°14′02″N 121°21′52″E	Upload file
PH-40-0076	San Pablo Cathedral	Seat of the bishop of the Roman Catholic Diocese of San Pablo	Laguna	San Pablo	A. Flores St.	14°04′11″N 121°19′37″E	Upload file
PH-40-0077	Fule-Malvar Mansion	Historic house built by spouses Eusebia Fule and Potenciano Malvar in 1915	Laguna	San Pablo	Rizal Avenue	14°04′17″N 121°19′21″E	Upload file
PH-40-0078	Villa Escudero Plantations	A hacienda and coconut plantation established by the family of Don Placido Escudero in 1872.	Laguna and Quezon	San Pablo, Laguna; Tiaong and Dolores in Quezon	Pan-Philippine Highway	13°59′42″N 121°20′32″E	More images
PH-40-0079	Siniloan Church	Church of Sts. Peter and Paul	Laguna	Siniloan	Paete-Pakil-Famy Diversion Rd.	14°25′19″N 121°26′46″E	Upload file
PH-40-0080	Santa Cruz Church	Immaculate Conception Parish Church of Santa Cruz, Laguna	Laguna	Santa Cruz	P. Guevarra St.	14°16′57″N 121°24′53″E	Upload file
PH-40-0081	Site of the Battle of Santa Cruz		Laguna	Santa Cruz			Upload Photo
PH-40-0082	Gala-Rodriguez House	Built in the early 1930s by Dr. Isidro Rodriguez as gift to his ailing wife Doña Gregoria Gala. Designed by architect Juan Nakpil.	Quezon	Sariaya	44 Rizal St.	13°57′43″N 121°31′29″E	Upload file
PH-40-0083	Tayabas Provincial Capitol Building		Quezon	Tayabas			Upload file
PH-40-0084	Claro M. Recto Shrine		Quezon	Tiaong			Upload file
PH-40-0085	Atimonan Church	The present Parish Church of Our Lady of the Angels and its adjoining convent were constructed between 1687 and 1700.	Quezon	Atimonan	Manuel L. Quezon Blvd.	14°00′05″N 121°55′17″E	More images
PH-40-0086	Iskong Bantay Watchtower	The only lookout and defense watchtower existing of the seven built around 1752 to guard the town against pirates.	Quezon	Atimonan			Upload Photo
PH-40-0087	Fort San Diego	Built in the late 18th century, Fort San Diego is the only remaining of the four fortifications at each corner of town forming a quadrilateral.	Quezon	Gumaca		13°55′23″N 122°06′01″E	More images
PH-40-0088	Gumaca Church	Its first establishment was in 1582 by the Franciscans. It was transferred to Silangan in the island of Alabat, Quezon in 1638. It was burned by the Dutch forces in 1665, then transferred back in Gumaca. The church was reconstructed in 1846. Known as one of the biggest and oldest Catholic churches in the province of Quezon, this Baroque church is made out of coral stone blocks and bricks.	Quezon	Gumaca		13°55′18″N 122°05′58″E	Upload file
PH-40-0089	La Casa de Doña Ana	The heritage house was built after the marriage of Pedro Nepomucino Villaseñor and Ana Maria Herrera De La Concepcion in 1842.	Quezon	Lucban	Quezon Avenue	14°06′50″N 121°33′19″E	Upload file
PH-40-0090	Lucban Church	The present Parish Church of Saint Louis of Toulouse was completed in 1738 with the convent, in 1743.	Quezon	Lucban	La Purisima Concepcion St.	14°06′53″N 121°33′13″E	More images
PH-40-0091	Site of Battle of Barrio Piis	Battle fought on December 26, 1941 between American-Filipino forces and the encroaching Japanese soldiers in the early part of World War II.	Quezon	Lucban	Lucban-Sampaloc Road	14°08′55″N 121°35′45″E	Upload Photo
PH-40-0092	Colegio Sagrado Corazon de Jesus		Quezon	Lucena			Upload Photo
PH-40-0093	Lucena Cathedral	The Cathedral of Saint Ferdinand is the seat of the Diocese of Lucena. It was built between May 1882 and July 1884.	Quezon	Lucena	Quezon Ave.	13°56′09″N 121°36′45″E	More images
PH-40-0094	Quezon Provincial Capitol	The neoclassical Art Deco capitol building of the former Tayabas province, designed by Juan Arellano, was constructed in 1908.	Quezon	Lucena	Quezon Ave.	13°55′42″N 121°36′48″E	Upload file
PH-40-0095	Sacred Heart College	It is the oldest Catholic educational institution for men and women in Quezon Province founded on April 27, 1884.	Quezon	Lucena	Merchan St.	13°56′24″N 121°36′54″E	Upload Photo
PH-40-0096	Mauban Church	First church and convent were constructed in 1647 and demolished in 1769. The second church collapsed during the 1880 earthquakes. Third church was built in 1891. Historical marker was placed in 1939. Present church looks recently built.	Quezon	Mauban			More images
PH-40-0097	Rizal Hill Park	Highest point in Gumaca, lookout point during the Spanish era, military headquarters during the American period	Quezon	Mauban			More images
PH-40-0098	Pagbilao Church	The present Church of St. Catherine of Alexandria was constructed in 1845 under Fr. Victorino Peralija. Together with the convent and belfry, it was completed in 1877 under Fr. Eugenio Gomez. After it was destroyed during liberation from World War II, it was repaired in 1954 under Fr. Vicente Urlanda.	Quezon	Pagbilao	Pan-Philippines Highway	13°58′20″N 121°41′12″E	Upload file
PH-40-0099	Natalio Enriquez House	Beaux-Arts mansion of former provincial governor Natalio Enriquez.	Quezon	Sariaya	Pan-Philippine Highway	13°57′48″N 121°31′28″E	Upload file
PH-40-0100	Rodriguez House (Villa Sariaya)	Ancestral house owned by Don Catalino Rodriguez, town mayor of Sariaya from 1908–1909. Opened to the public as Villa Sariaya.	Quezon	Sariaya	Rizal St. cor. Daliz St.	13°57′47″N 121°31′30″E	Upload file
PH-40-0101	St. Francis of Assisi Church (Sariaya)	The present Church of Saint Francis of Assisi was constructed in 1748 after the previous church were destroyed by earthquakes and floods from its previous locations.	Quezon	Sariaya	Pan-Philippine Highway	13°57′49″N 121°31′26″E	Upload file
PH-40-0102	Malagonlong Bridge	A 445-foot (136 m) long stone arch bridge over the Dumaca-a River built during the Spanish colonial period, between 1840 and 1850.	Quezon	Tayabas	Tayabas-Pagbilao Rd.	14°00′47″N 121°37′01″E	More images
PH-40-0102	Casa Comunidad de Tayabas	Originally built with light materials in 1776 as a Casa Tribunal (courthouse) and later, a guesthouse for travelers; it was reconstructed in stone in 1831. After it burned down in World War II, it was reconstructed by the NHI and declared a National Historical Landmark in 1978.	Quezon	Tayabas	P. Silang St.	14°01′32″N 121°35′30″E	More images
PH-40-0103	Tayabas Basilica		Quezon	Tayabas	P. Silang St.	14°01′33″N 121°35′27″E	More images
PH-40-0104	Vicente Manansala Shrine		Rizal	Binangonan			Upload file
PH-40-0105	Pamitinan Cave Shrine		Rizal	Rodriguez	M.H. del Pilar St.	14°43′55″N 121°11′20″E	Upload Photo
PH-40-0106	Antipolo Cathedral		Rizal	Antipolo	M.L. Quezon St.	14°35′16″N 121°10′36″E	More images
PH-40-0107	Boso-Boso Church	The Church of Our Lady of the Annunciation was established by the Jesuits in the 17th century and transferred to the secular clergy in 1768. It was damaged during the 1880 earthquake, burned down in 1943 during WWII and restored in 1995.	Rizal	Antipolo (Boso-Boso)	Sitio Old (Lower) Boso-Boso	14°38′22″N 121°14′18″E	More images
PH-40-0108	Baras Church		Rizal	Baras	A. Bonifacio St.	14°31′22″N 121°16′03″E	Upload file
PH-40-0109	Cainta Church		Rizal	Cainta	Bonifacio Ave.	14°34′40″N 121°06′56″E	More images
PH-40-0110	Morong Church	The present Church of Saint Jerome was constructed in the 17th century, its frontispiece and belfry were built by Bartolome Palatino of Paete from 1850–1853.	Rizal	Morong	Turentigue St.	14°30′52″N 121°14′16″E	More images
PH-40-0111	Morong High School Building		Rizal	Morong	Manila East Rd cor. Sumulong St.	14°31′01″N 121°14′20″E	Upload file
PH-40-0112	Tomas Claudio Intermediate School		Rizal	Morong	T.Claudio St.	14°31′04″N 121°14′19″E	Upload file
PH-40-0113	Tanay Church		Rizal	Tanay	M.H.del Pilar St.	14°29′55″N 121°17′05″E	More images
PH-40-0114	Taytay Church		Rizal	Taytay	Kadalagahan St.	14°34′15″N 121°07′57″E	Upload file
PH-40-0115	Jose Rizal Monument		Rizal	Taytay	J. Sumulong St.	14°34′14″N 121°07′54″E	Upload Photo
PH-40-0116	Pililla Church		Rizal	Pililla	J.P. Rizal St.	14°28′48″N 121°18′24″E	Upload file

== See also ==
- List of historical markers of the Philippines in Calabarzon
- List of Cultural Properties of the Philippines in Angono, Rizal
