= Saint Francis of Assisi Parish Church (Sariaya) =

Roman Catholic church in Quezon, Philippines

Coordinates: 13°57′49″N 121°31′25″E

Sariaya Church
- St. Francis of Assisi Parish Church; Diocesan Shrine of Sto. Cristo de Burgos
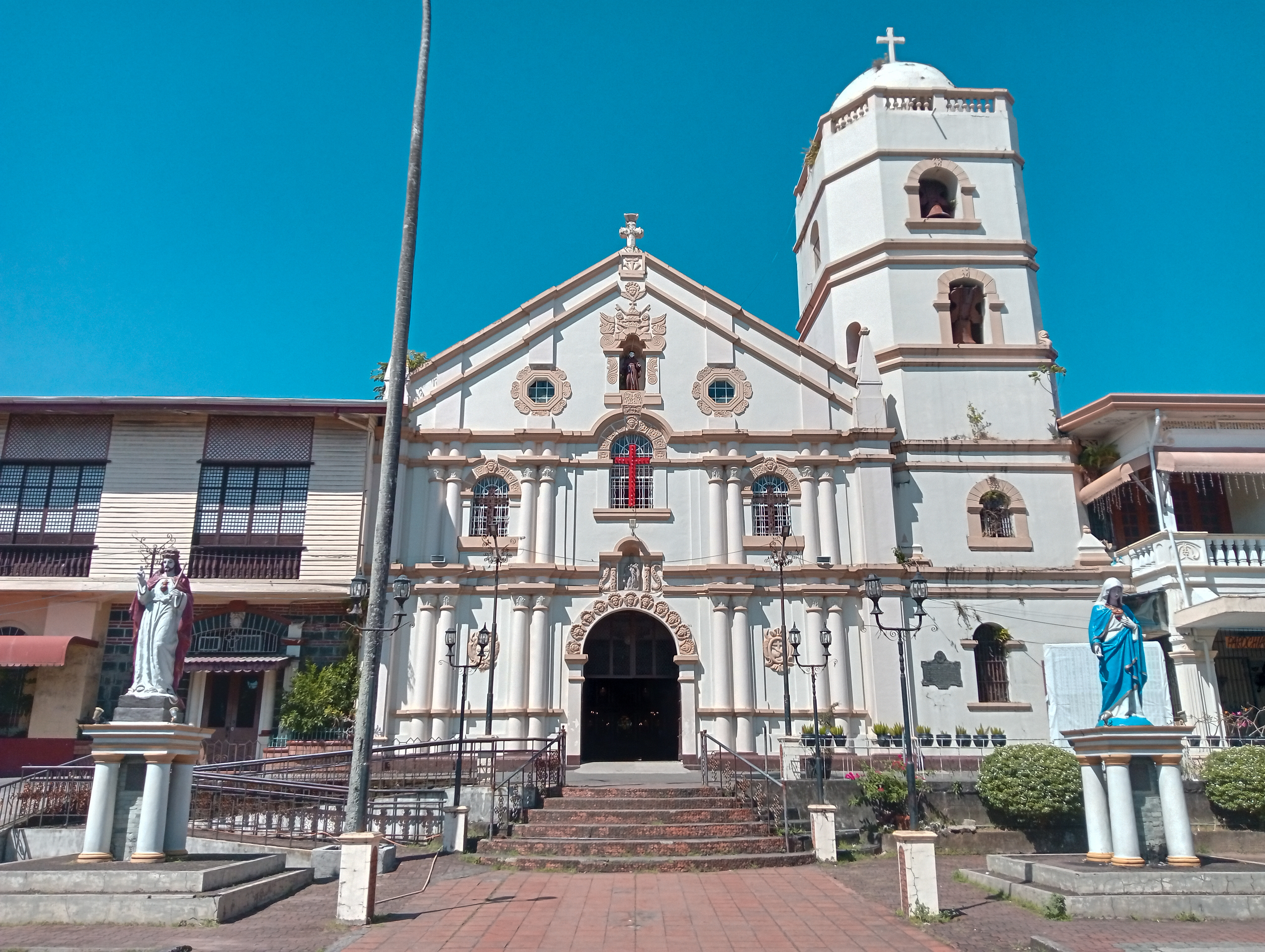
- Church facade in 2024
- Location: Poblacion, Sariaya, Quezon, Philippines
- Denomination: Roman Catholic
- Website: www.philippineheritagemap.org

History
- Status: Parish

Architecture
- Heritage designation: Important Cultural Property
- Architectural type: Church building
- Style: Barn Style Baroque
- Groundbreaking: 1599
- Completed: 1748

Specifications
- Materials: Sand, gravel, cement, mortar, steel and bricks

Administration
- Diocese: Lucena

Saint Francis of Assisi Parish Church, also known as the Diocesan Shrine of Santo Cristo de Burgos and commonly known as Sariaya Church, is a Roman Catholic church in Sariaya, Quezon, Philippines. It is under the jurisdiction of the Diocese of Lucena.

Based on the historical marker of St. Francis of Assisi Church, the first structure was constructed in 1599. The second church was built in 1605 but was replaced by a third church in 1641. In 1703, the town was transferred to Lumangbayan but the earthquakes and floods of 1743 destroyed the church and the town caused the people to transfer to the present site. The present church was built in 1748 during the term of two Spanish friars, namely Fr. Martin de Talavera and Fr. Joaquin Alapont.

== Church features ==
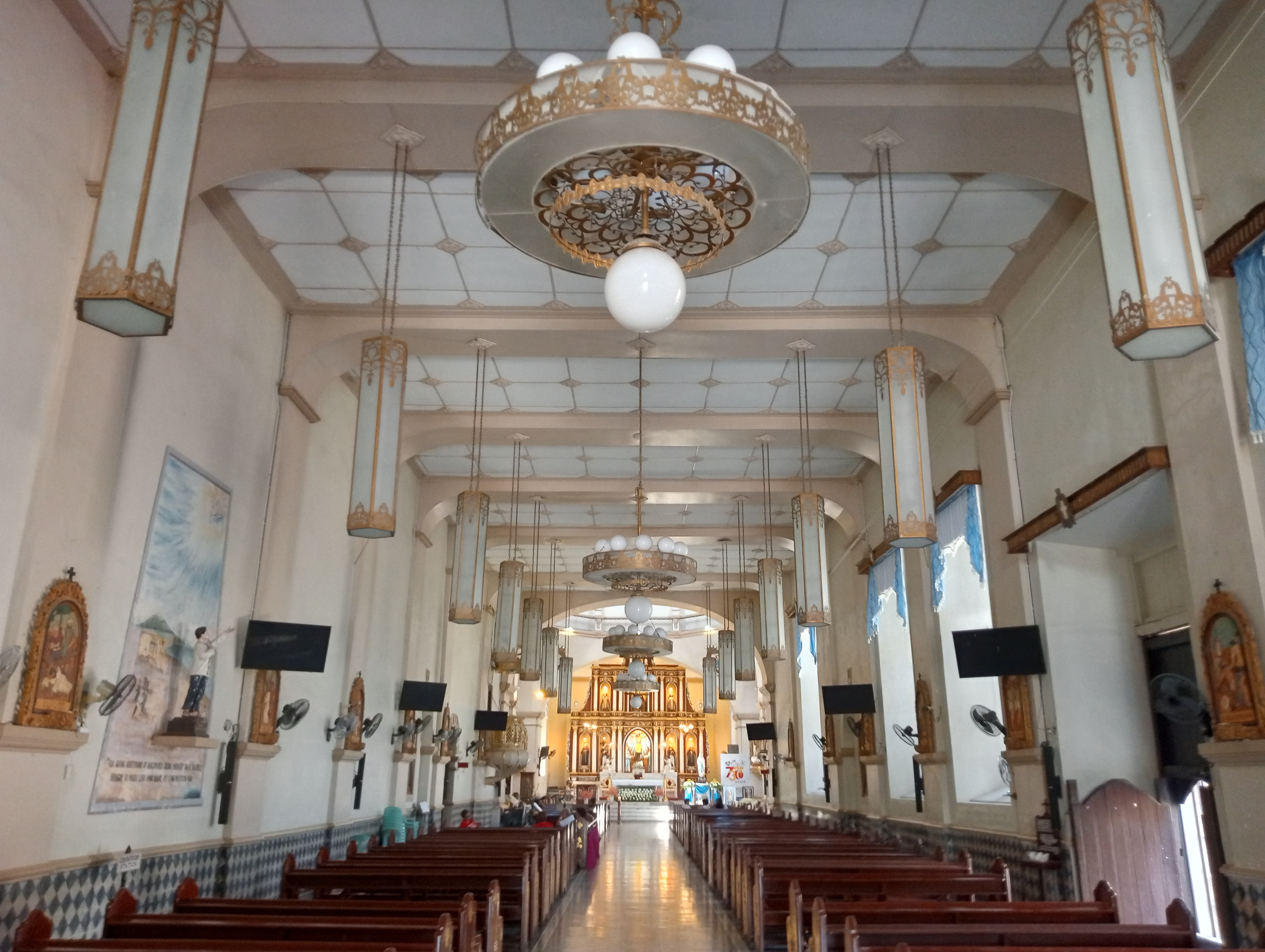
Church interior in 2024

The main features of the church include the old baptistery located at the first floor of the four-storey church belfry that contains old bells. Connected to the left side of the main structure is the 1922 convent that was erected during the term of Fr. Policarpio Trinidad. Inside the church is the old retablo and two side altars containing old images of saints, and the 18th-century replica of the medieval Santo Cristo de Burgos in Spain.

The walls of the church were made of red bricks embedded in masonry with adobe slabs plastered on the external surface of the walls. The original roof was made of roof bricks but it was changed to galvanized iron in 1947.

According to Eric Dedace, PRO of Sariaya Tourism Council, the present church is a product of free labor by the native inhabitants during the Spanish colonial era.

== The Altar of Sto. Cristo de Burgos ==
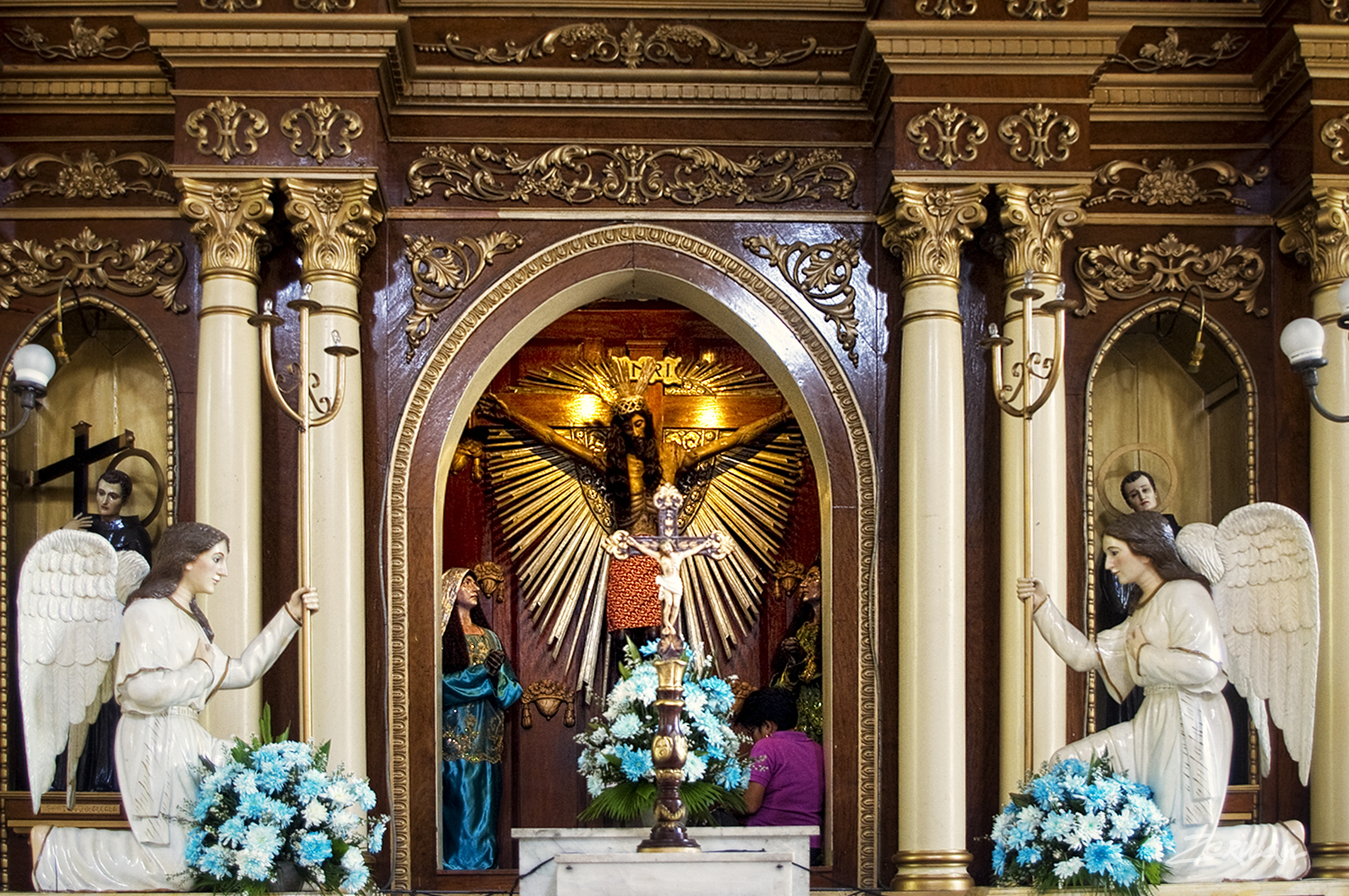
Church altar

The church houses the Sto. Cristo de Burgos image which is more popular than the acknowledged patron saint St. Francis of Assisi, as the former was believed to be miraculous and visited by pilgrims from far away places. According to Eric Dedace, PRO of Sariaya Tourism Council, the image was a gift of King Felipe V to the people of Lumang Bayan. In 1743, when the town site was destroyed by natural disasters and by Muslim invasion which leveled the town to the ground, the image of Santo Cristo de Burgos remained unscathed which they considered a miracle. The surviving residents wrapped the image in white cloth and then carried it further up Mount Banahaw slopes to find a much more suitable place to build a community. According to the story, the four men carrying the image rested a bit but when they tried to lift the icon, it became very heavy. They took it as another miracle and a sign from heaven that the town's people built a church on the exact site where the present Church of Saint Francis Assisi is located. The revered icon is now perpetually enshrined behind the retablo.

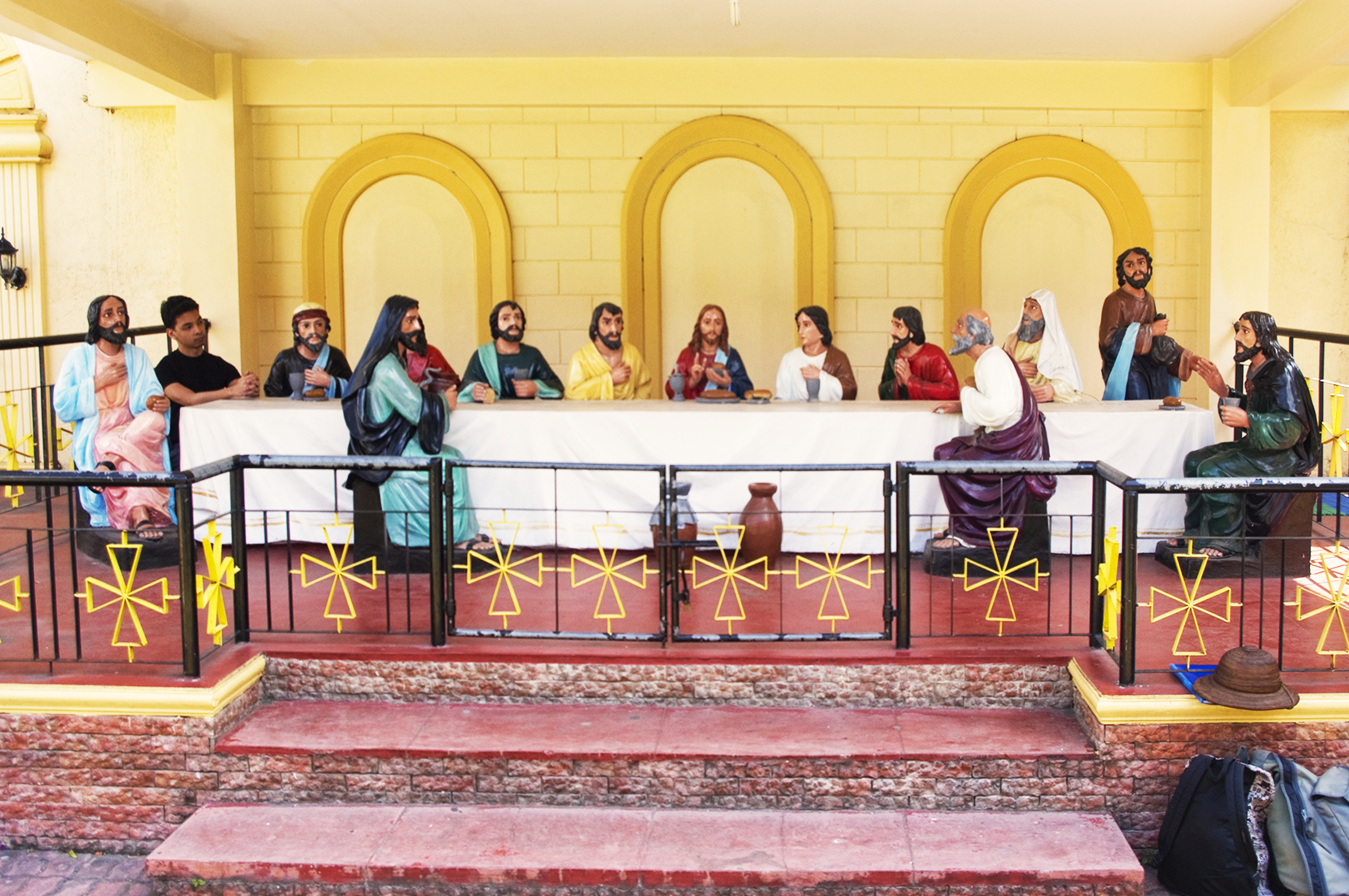
Added feature of Sariaya Church's inner courtyard, the life-sized replica of the Last Supper

== Added renovations ==
Recent renovation was done during the term of Rev. Msgr. Melecio V. Verastigue (2003–2009). The said renovation according to Eric Dedace, resulted in the intricate opulence of the church convent and the beautification of the church patio. A Devotional Park was also constructed on the inner courtyard that includes the Parlor of Saints, The Last Supper, the Grotto of Our Lady of Lourdes and the Candle Shrines. Six function halls were also added and the big Nazareth Multi-Purpose Hall. A Franciscan Museum, also known as the Museo ng Debosyon at Buhay, was also established containing old church implements, relics, old photograph reproductions as well as photos and installations of activities within the Franciscan Devotions.

== Gallery ==
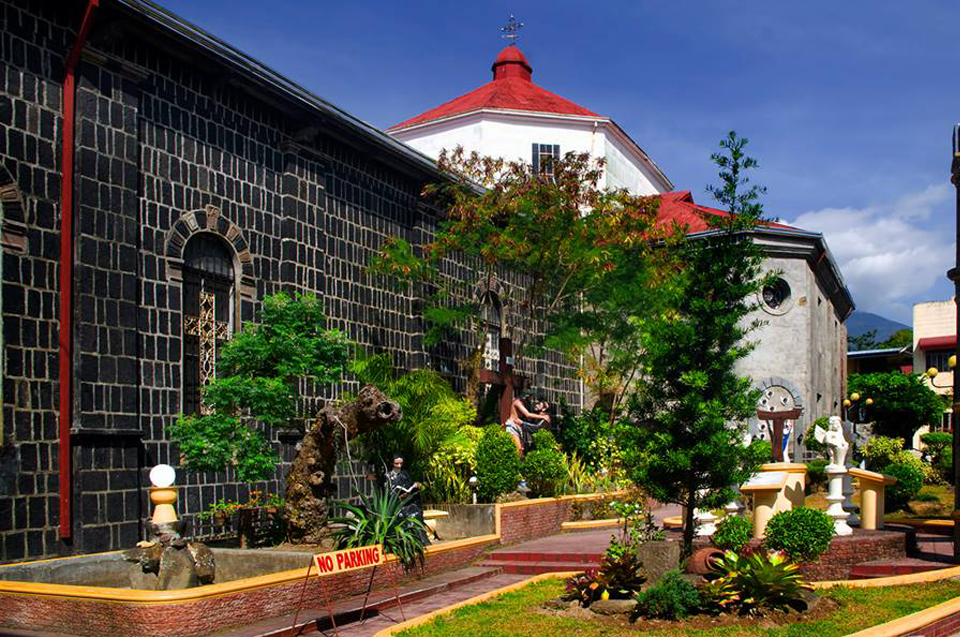
Church right side exterior

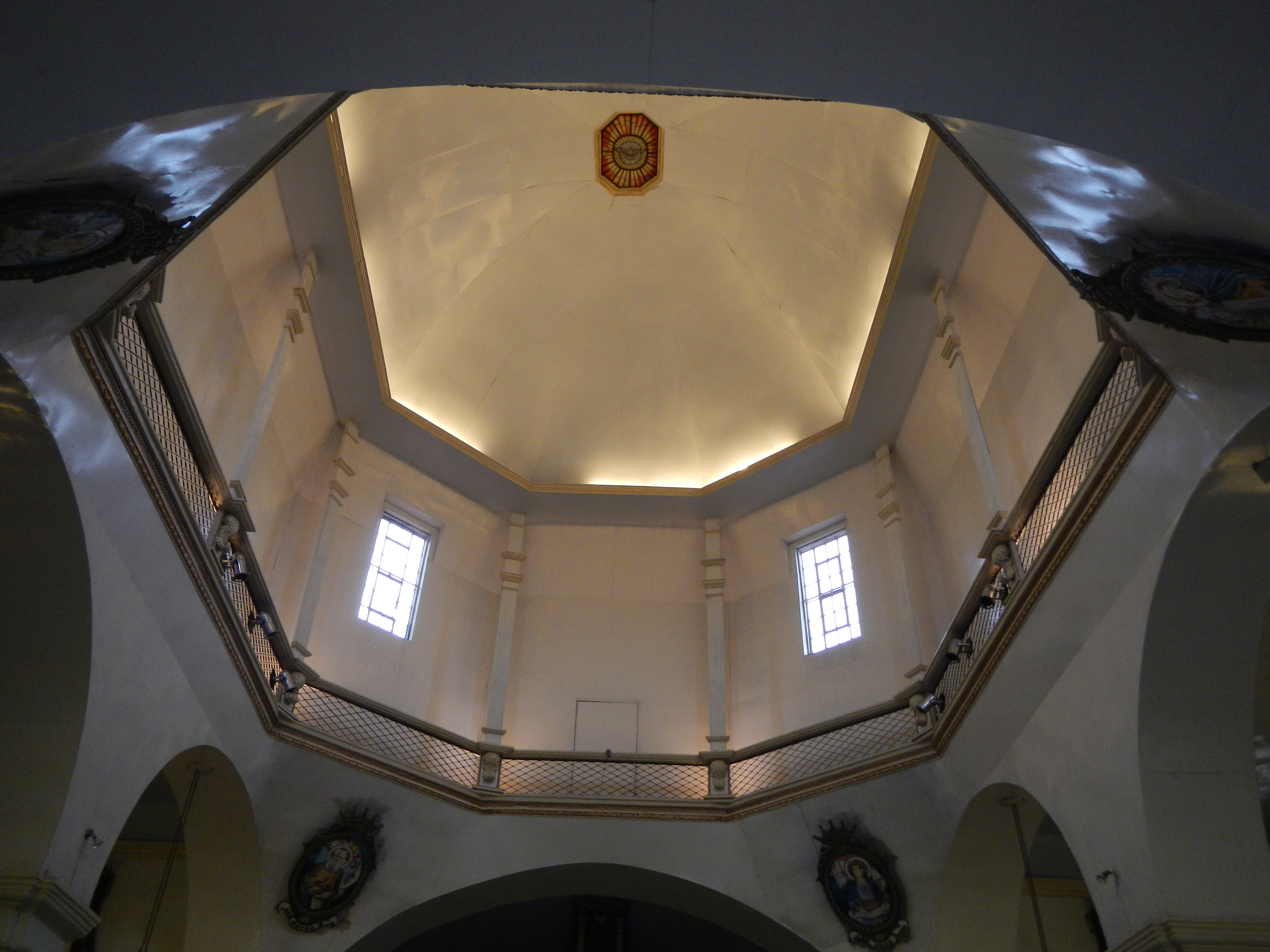
Dome interior and clerestories

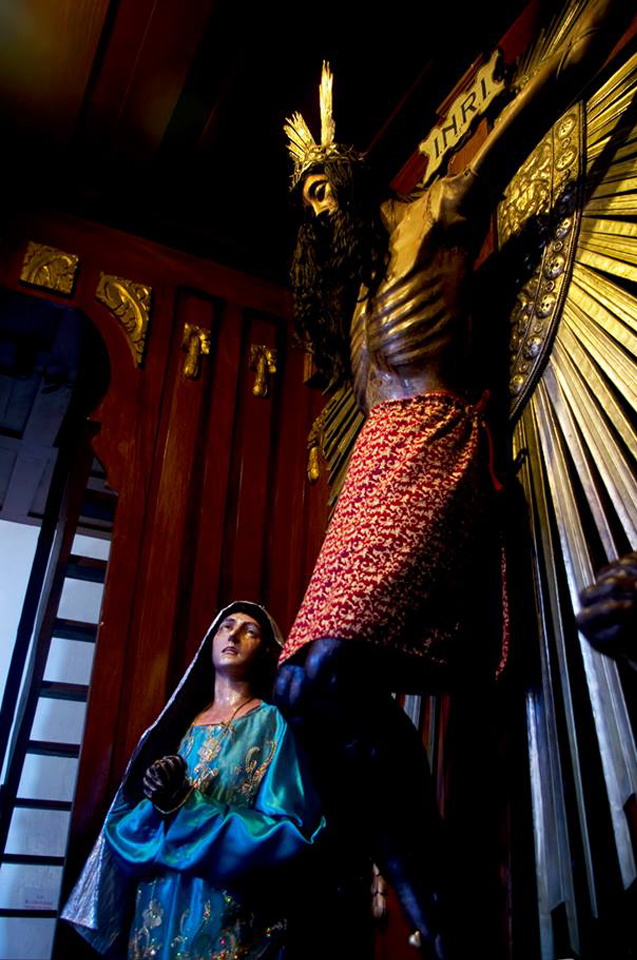
Santo Cristo de Burgos

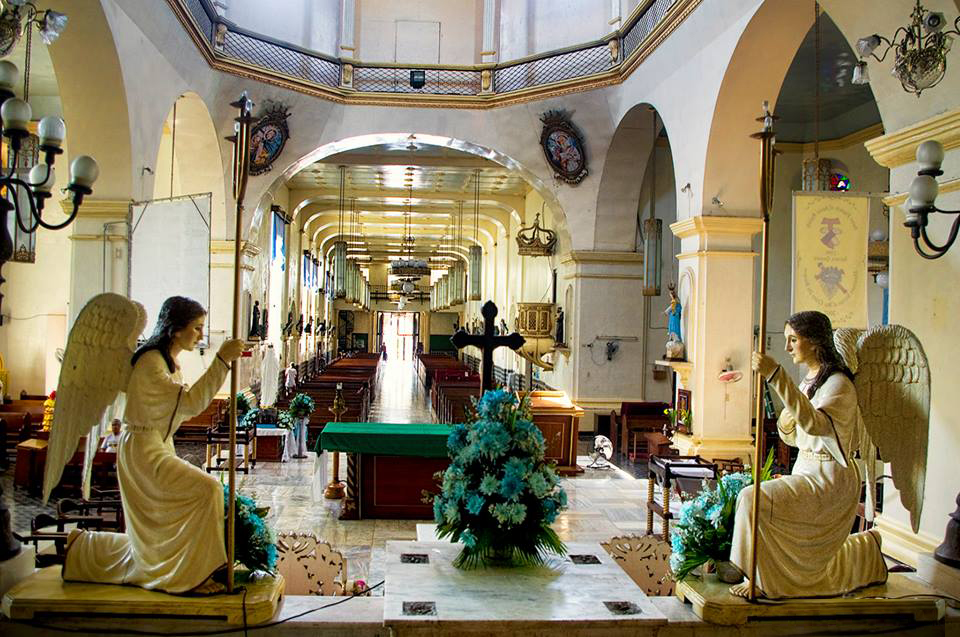
Church interior from the altar area

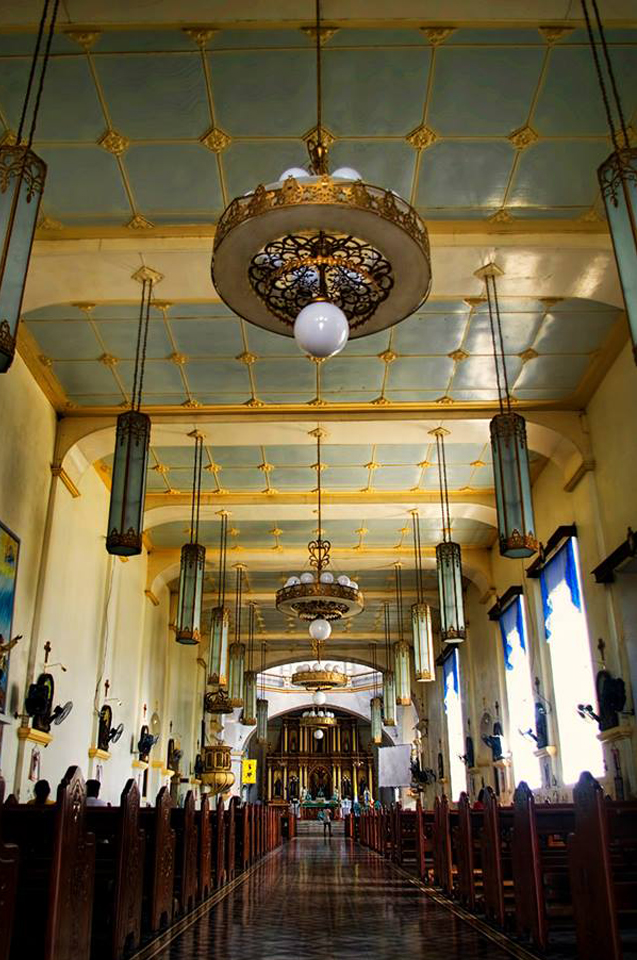
Church interior showing the altar and ceiling lamps

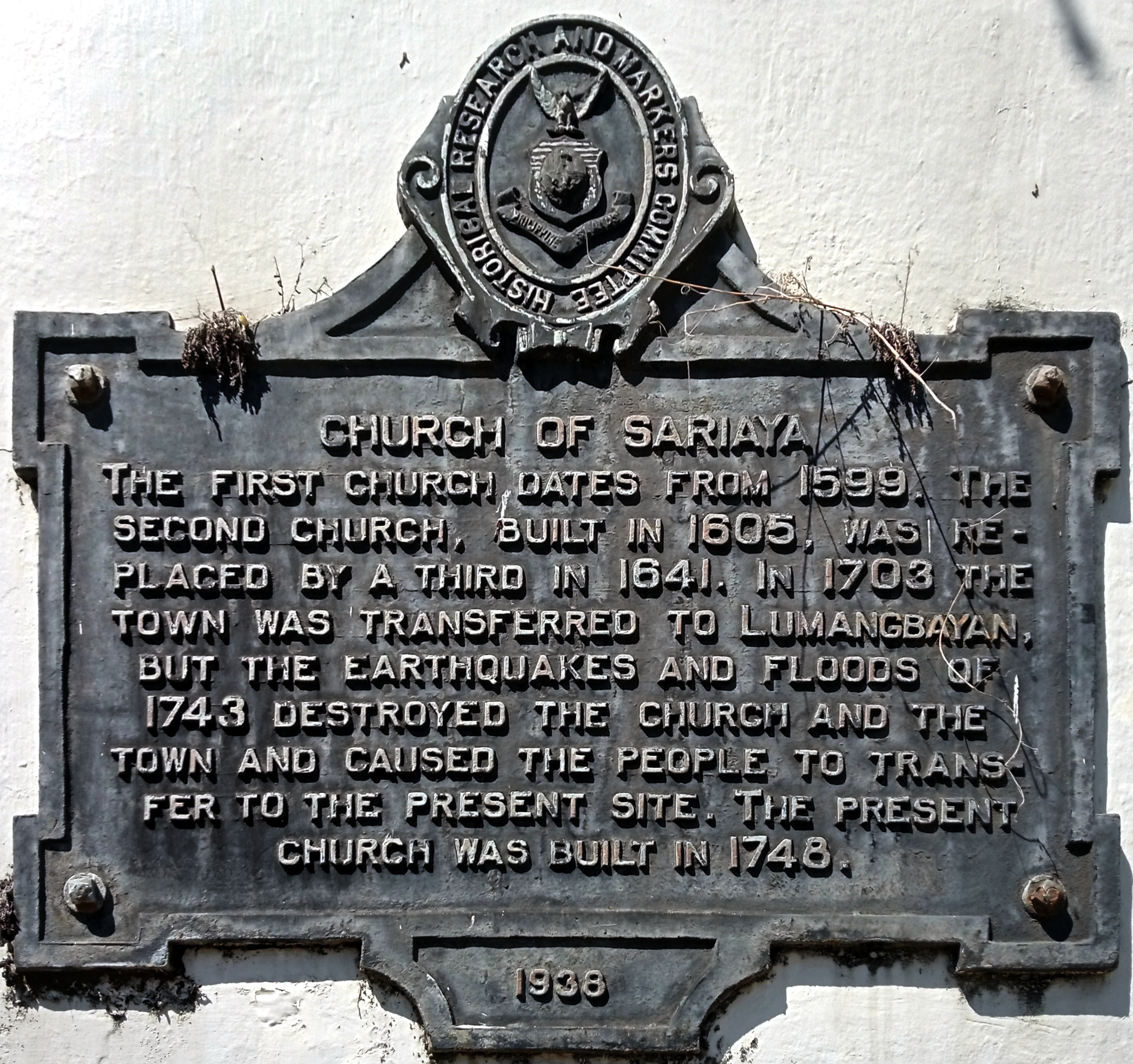
Church HRMC historical marker installed in 1938

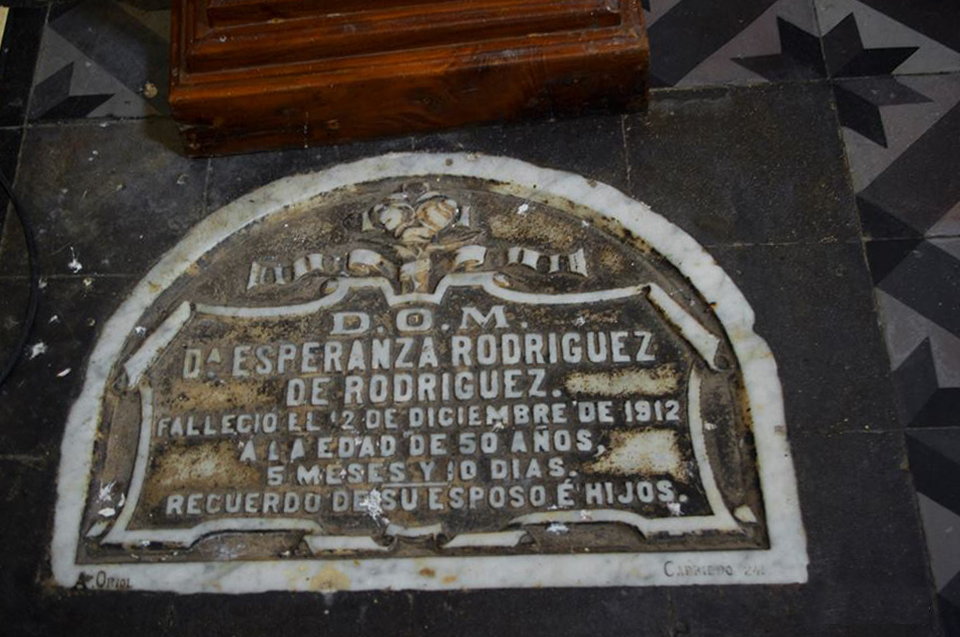
One of the rich people who had the privilege of having their bones interred inside the church

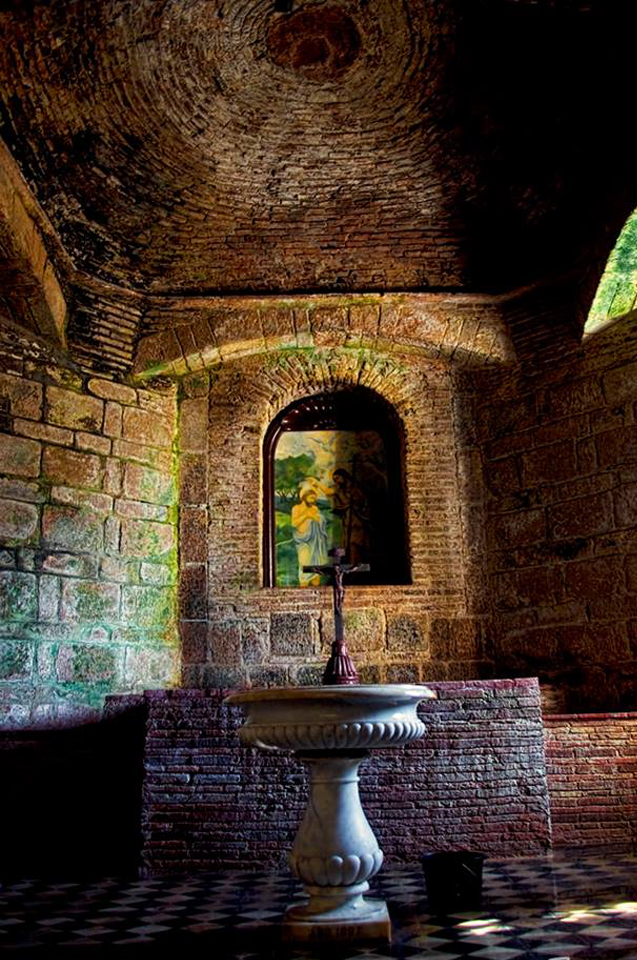
The old baptistery showing the original bricks, adobe blocks and masonry used in constructing the church between 1743 and 1748
