= Morong High School =

Public high school in Rizal, Philippines

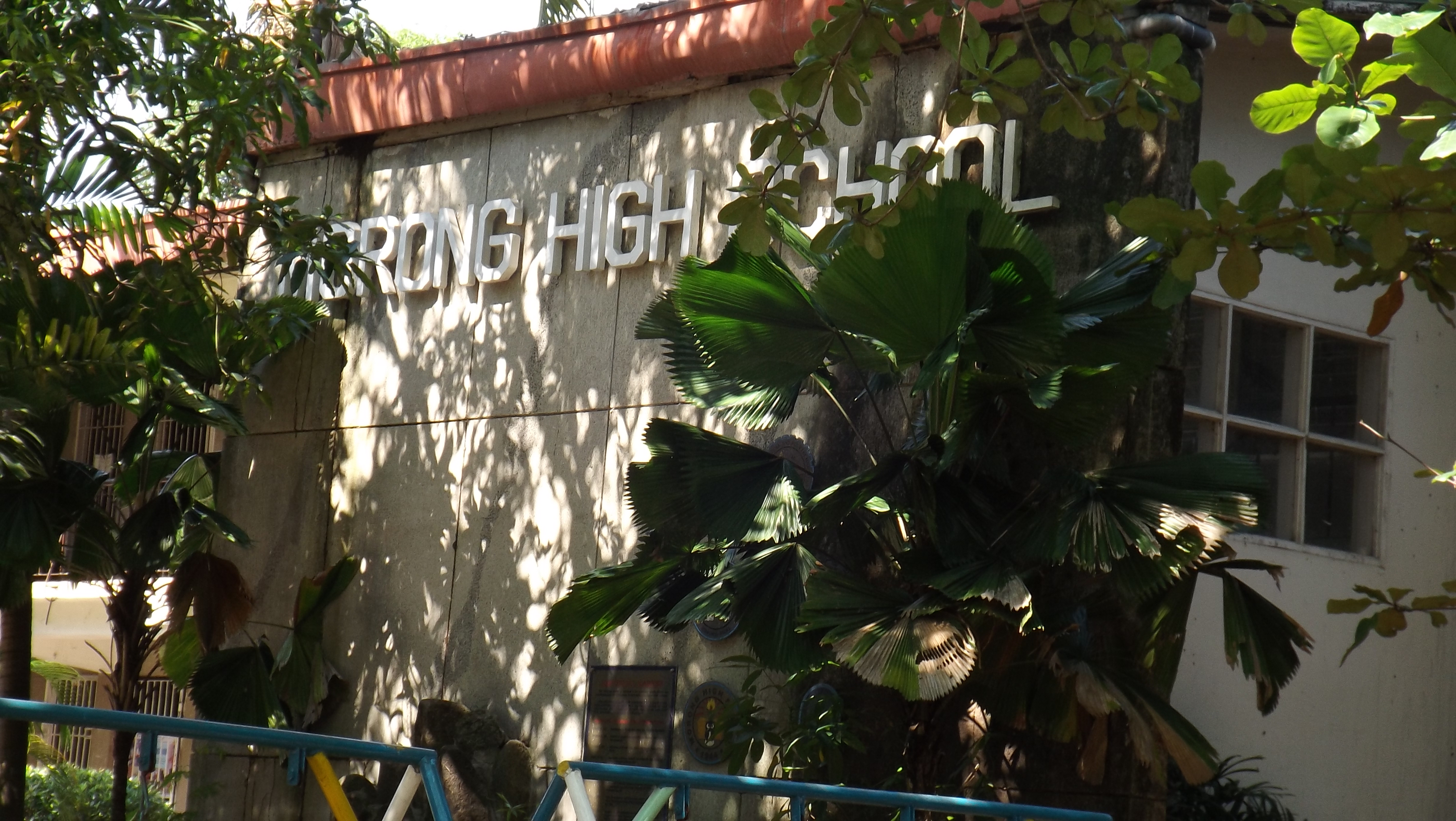
- Facade of Morong High School
- Interactive map of the Morong High School area

General information
- Status: active
- Location: J. Sumulong St., Brgy San Juan, Morong, Rizal
- Coordinates: 14°31′06″N 121°14′03″E
- Completed: 1944
- Opened: August 16, 1944

Technical details
- Floor count: 2

Website
- University of Rizal System - Morong Facebook page

Morong High School in Morong, Rizal was the first high school in the Philippines to be established outside the provincial capital. It was converted to a state college, named as Rizal Polytechnic College in 1995 through Republic Act 7933 and later on merged with Rizal State College and the Rizal Technological University Antipolo Annex and became part of the present University of Rizal System - Morong Campus.

== History and architecture ==
=== 1944-1951 ===
In 1944, the people in eastern Rizal requested Governor Nicanor Roxas to establish a public high school in Morong since the only provincial high school in Rizal was the Rizal High School in Pasig, which was about forty kilometers from Morong. The school was temporarily housed in the Commandancia, a Spanish building in the town plaza of Morong. Sports and physical education activities were held in the town plaza. Mr. Juan D. Francisco of Eastern Rizal Academy provided the necessary furniture and equipment. There were 252 pioneer students from the first to fourth year level who hailed from different municipalities in Rizal.

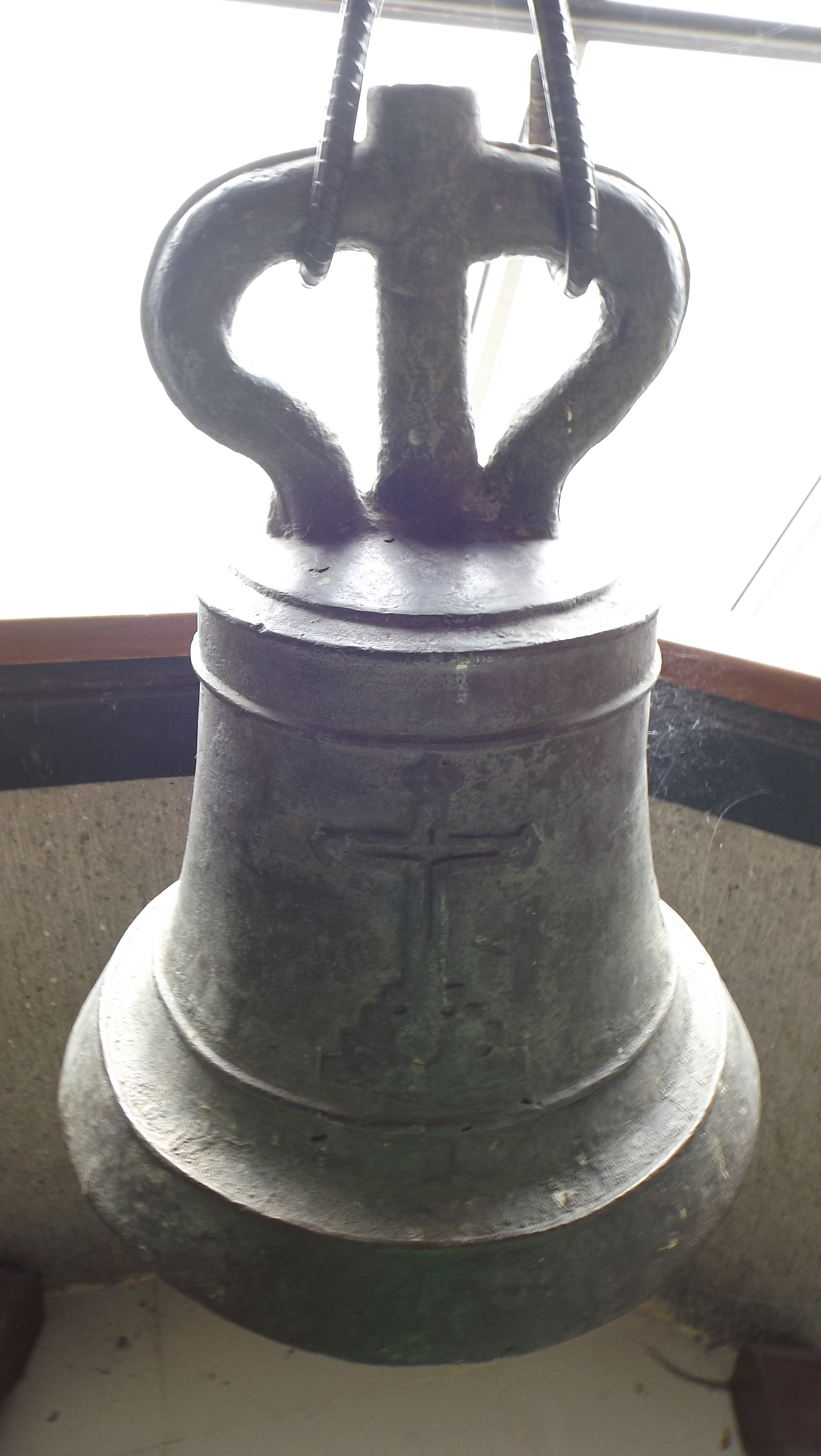
The old bell which rang during the first opening of classes on August 16, 1944

On August 16, 1944, the establishment of Morong High School was approved. Mr. Monico Mateo became the Founding Principal.

On December 22, 1944, the school was closed due to the arrival of the American Liberation Forces but was re-opened on July 1, 1945 during the re-established Commonwealth.

From 1944 to 1951, there was a struggle to acquire a school site for Morong High School.

On November 20, 1951, a site at the back of Tomas Claudio Memorial Elementary School, formerly Morong Elementary School, was acquired.

=== 1952-1976 ===
On October 16, 1952, the Morong High School was transferred to its permanent site and the construction of the home economics building was started. A one-room concrete building was built and was used as a library. Additional improvements were made by constructing comfort rooms and additional classrooms. The additional wing to the main building was constructed with the release of 20,000 pesos as part of the pork barrel funds of Senate President Eulogio Rodriguez, Sr. and Congressman Serafin Salvador.

In 1958, a building housing a cafeteria, retail store, storeroom, native kitchen and dining hall was constructed. The construction of main gate made of welded iron bars, which started in 1955, was completed in this year.

In June 1961, the dilapidated camarins which were used as classrooms since 1952 were replaced with two one-storey Rodriguez-type buildings with four rooms each, with window jalousies to accommodate the increasing school population. These buildings were inaugurated on September 28, 1961.

The agronomy building with a tool room was also completed. The library building was remodeled, by constructing a mezzanine floor and an office for the school newspaper. The campus landscape was also improved by adding a lagoon and dike along the creek and cementing the pathway.

Typhoon Yoling damaged the high school gymnasium, the home economics building, the Rodriguez-type buildings and part of the administration building on November 19, 1970. The gymnasium was never replaced.

On October 11, 1975, the construction of Amang Hall started.

On July 7, 1976, the Provincial Board of Rizal requested for the nationalization of Morong High School. It was on August 20, 1976 when it was converted into Morong National High School.

=== 1977-1982 ===
On March 30, 1977, another turning point in the school's history happened when it was converted to Morong National Comprehensive School, where general education, both college preparatory and vocational-technical courses, were offered. It became one of the 28 comprehensive high schools in the country during that time.

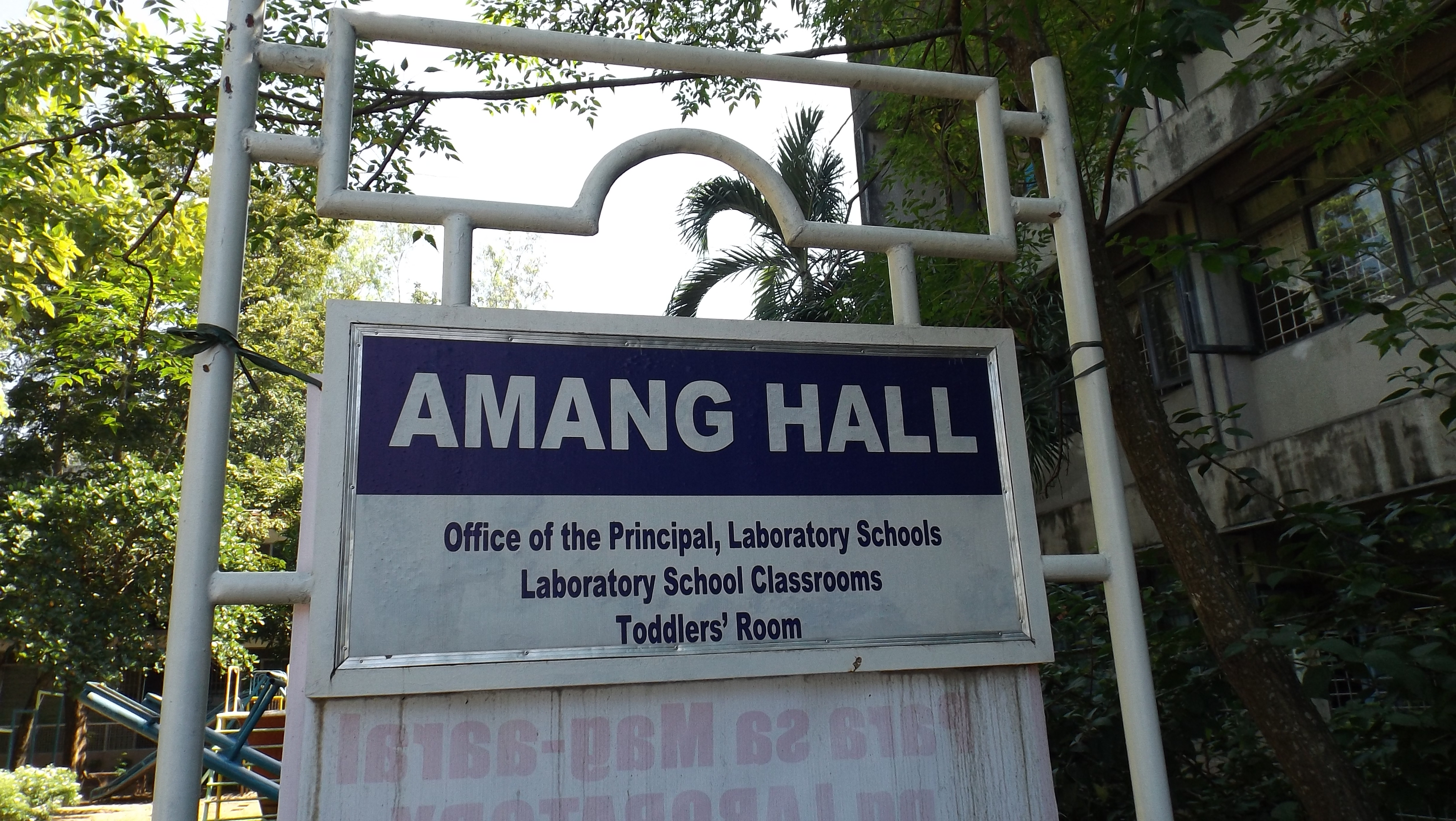
This building was constructed in 1975. It remained in its present status after all other buildings were demolished.

On February 27, 1980, the massive infrastructure project started for the Morong National Comprehensive School complex. The old buildings were demolished except the Amang Hall, which became the laboratory school.

=== 1983-1988 ===
The school integrated with Tomas Claudio Memorial Elementary School and converted to Rizal Technological and Polytechnic Institute, by virtue of Batas Pambansa Blg. 469, signed by President Ferdinand E. Marcos on June 10, 1983. The school complex was inaugurated on November 29, 1983.

=== 1995 ===
The Rizal Technological and Polytechnic Institute became the Rizal Polytechnic College, a state college on March 1, 1995 through Republic Act 7933 with extension campuses in Cainta and Cardona.

=== 2001 to Present ===
By virtue of Republic Act 9157 signed on August 11, 2001, Rizal Polytechnic College became part of University of Rizal System, merging with Rizal State College (former Rizal College of Agriculture and Technology (RCAT) Pililla, Rizal Campus) and Rizal Technological University Antipolo Annex. Its area presently covers approximately 17 hectares including the area occupied by DepEd public elementary and secondary schools. Advance and well-planned facilities are currently serving its students and faculty of the colleges of Education, Industrial Technology, Science and Engineering.

== Gallery ==
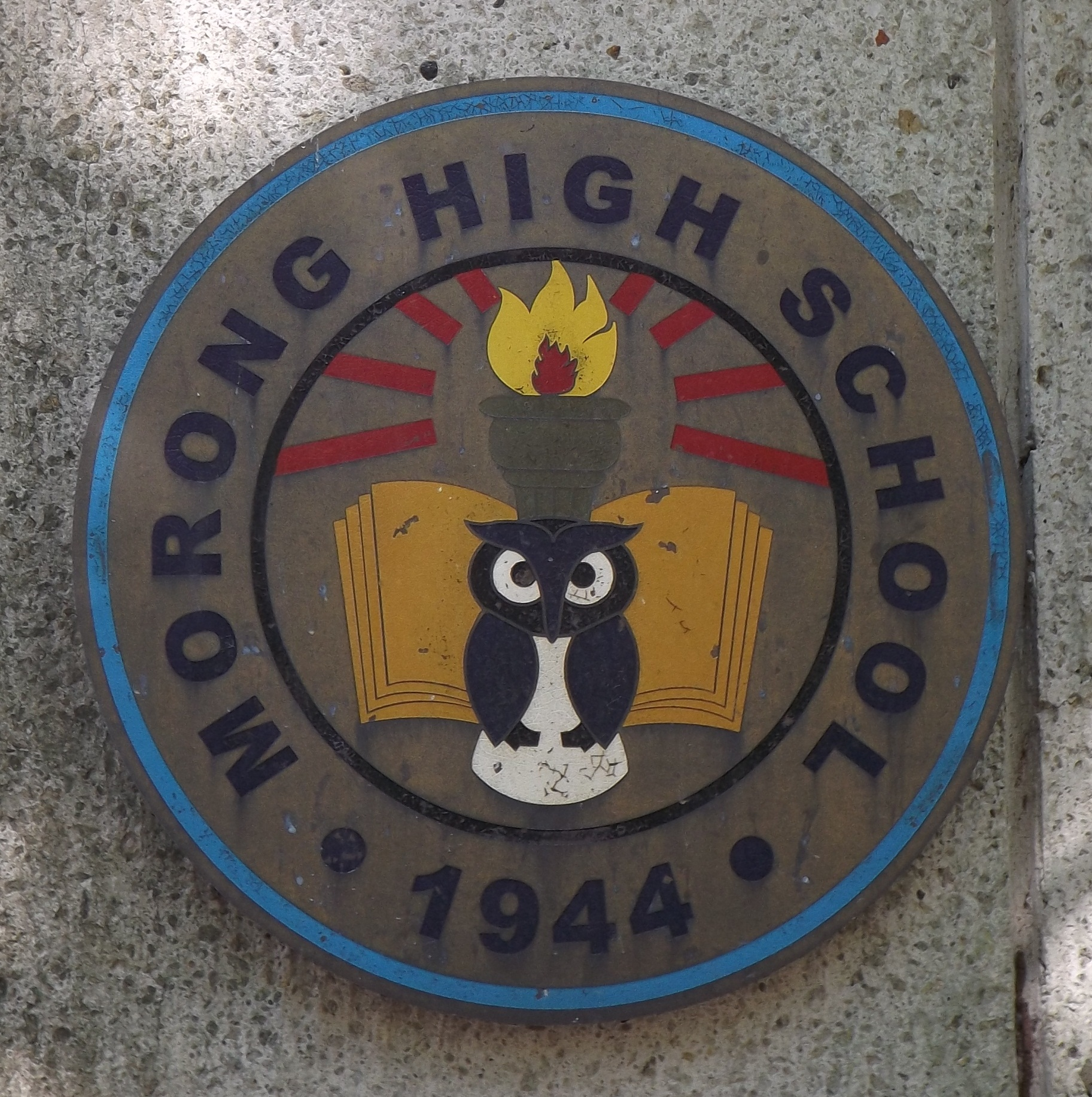
School Logo

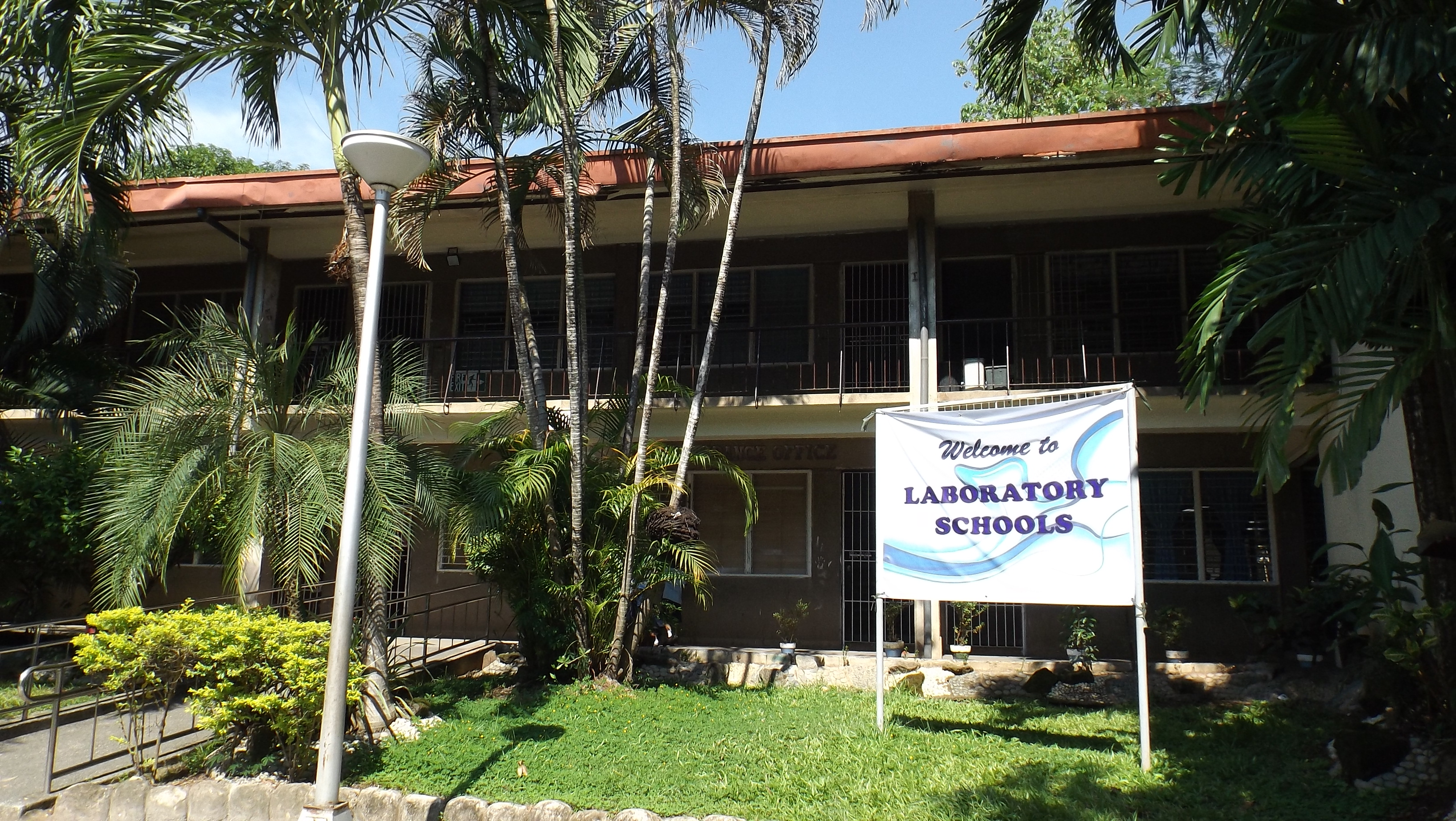
Morong High School Building, now the Laboratory

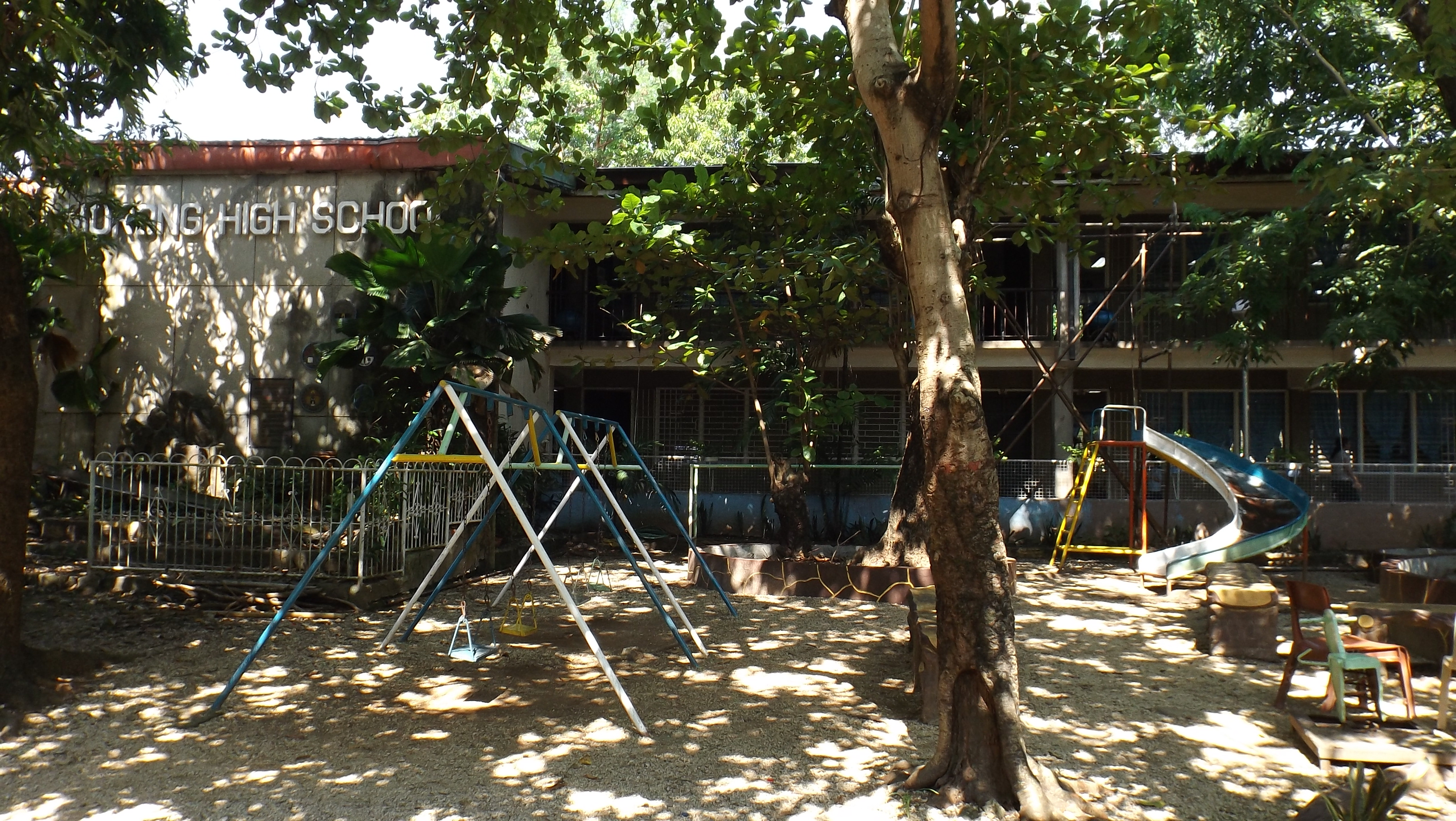
High School Building

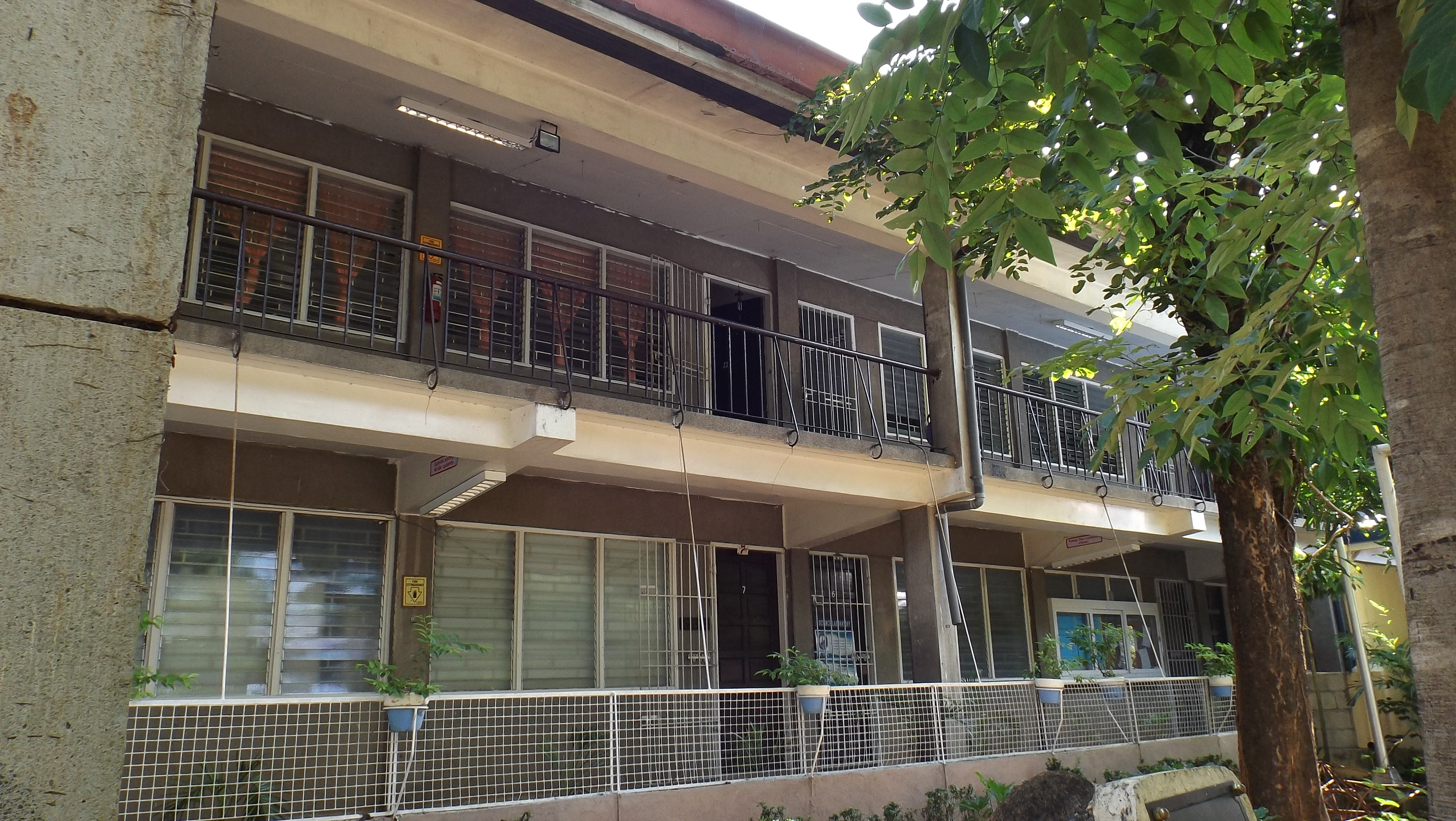
Front side

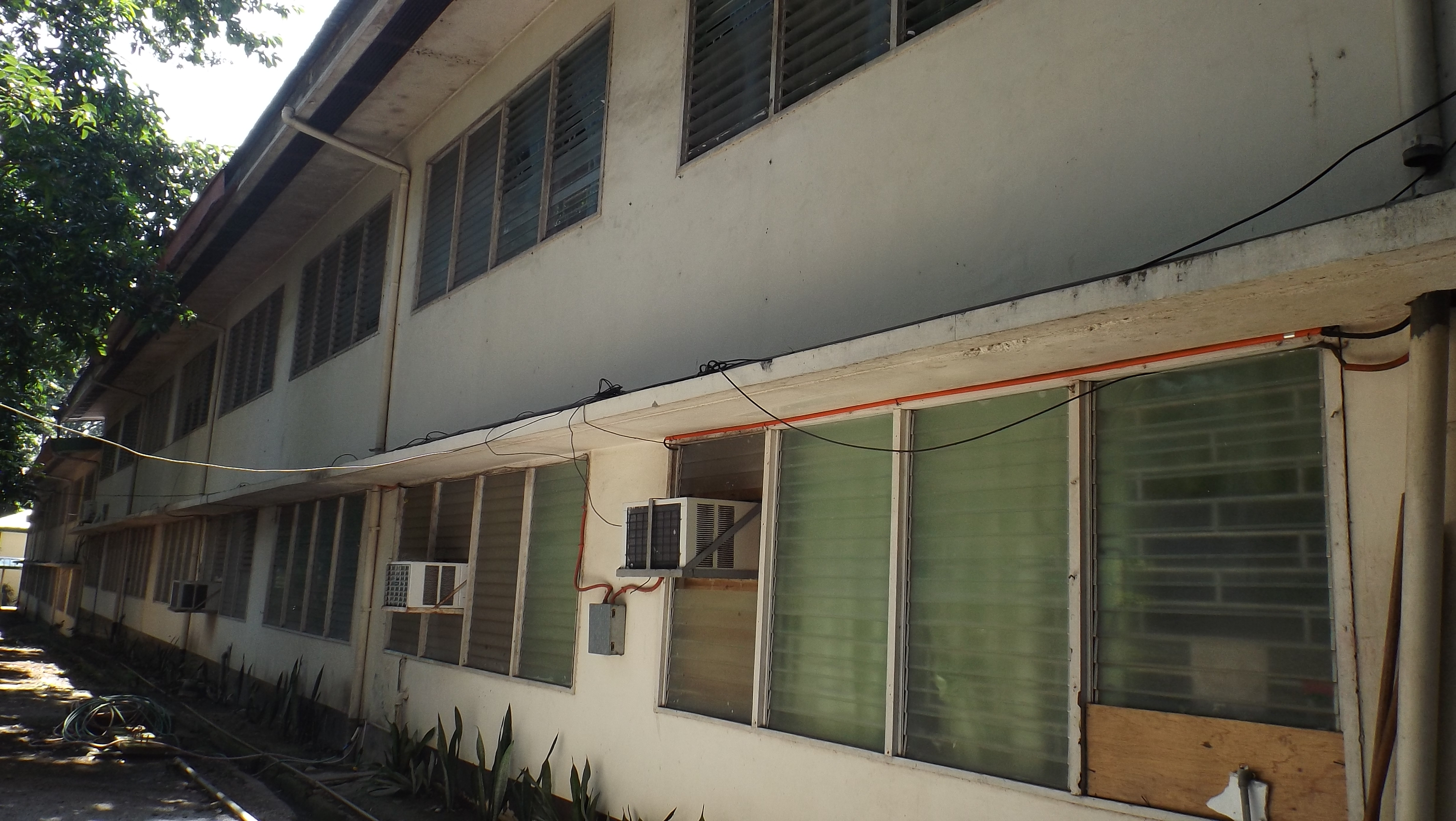
Rear Side

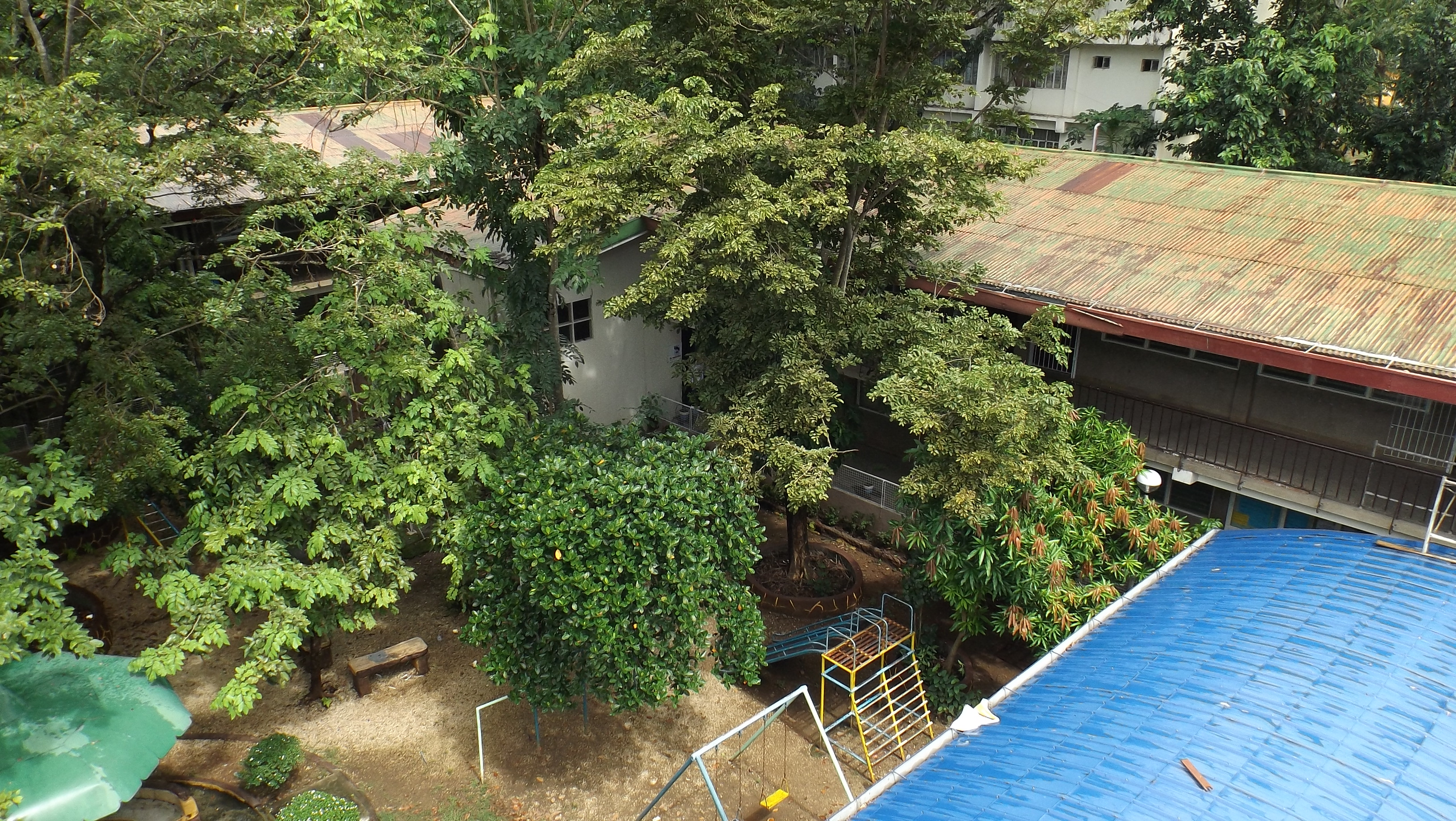
Top view

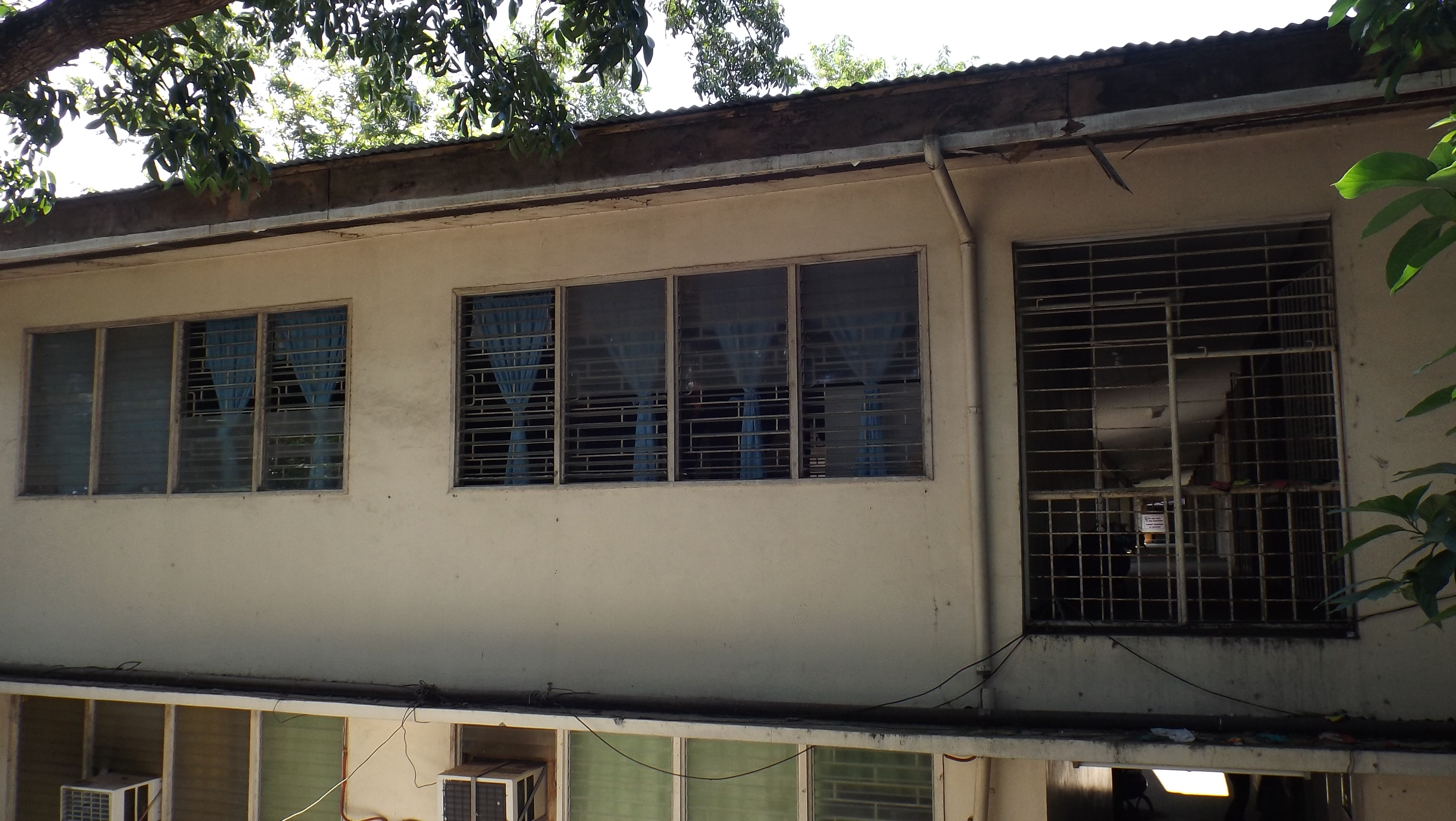
Second Floor

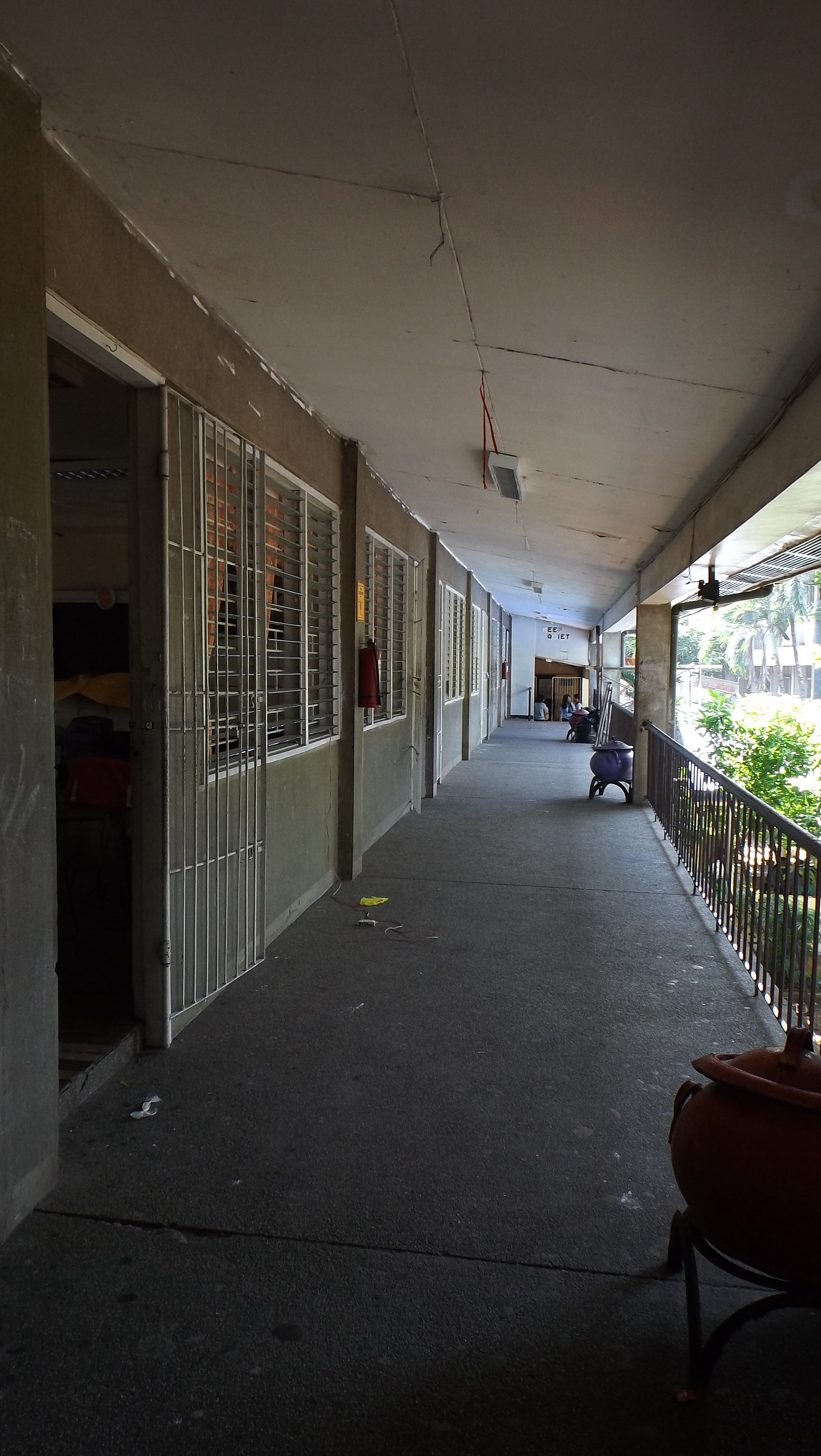
Corridor

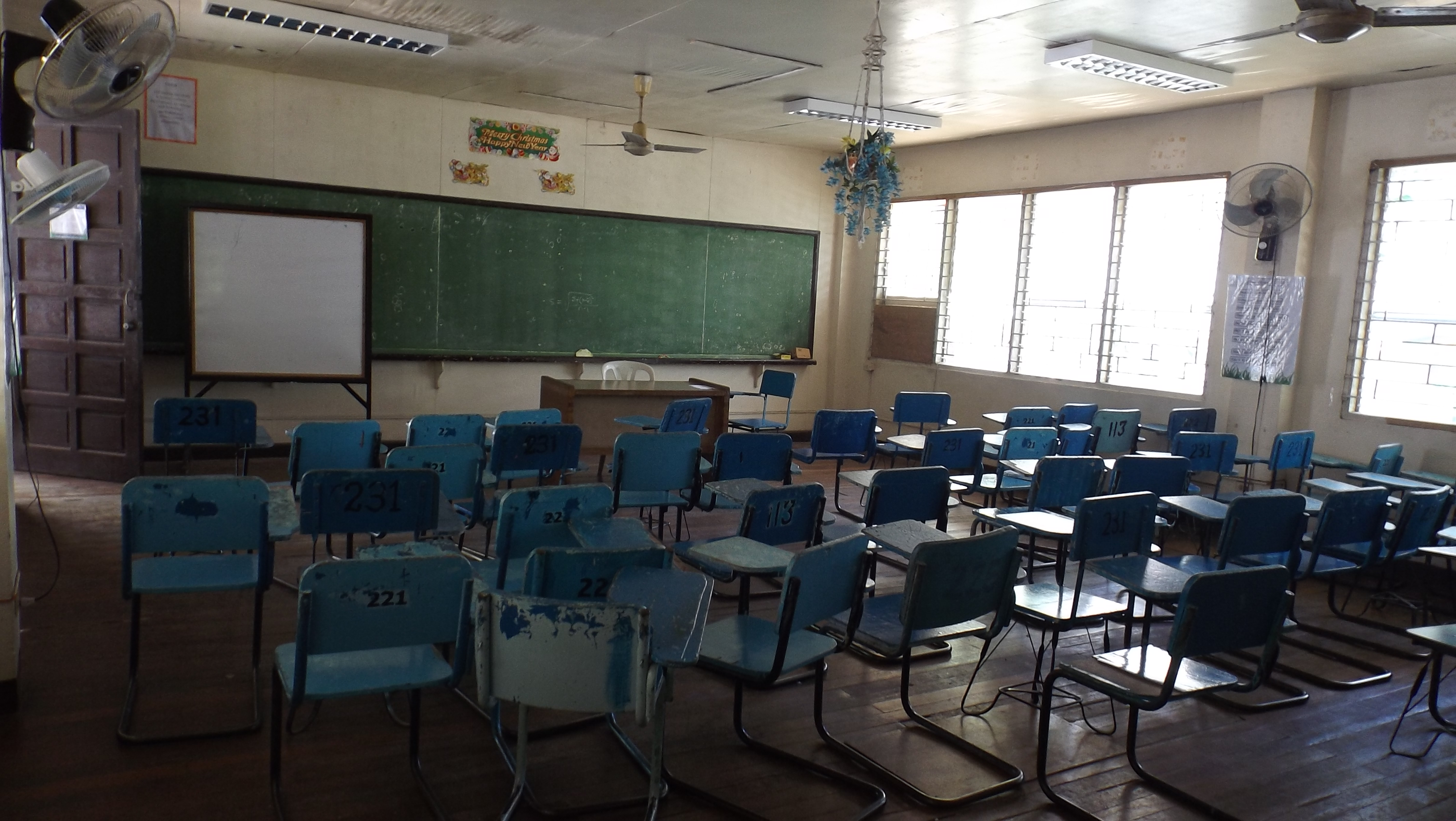
Classroom

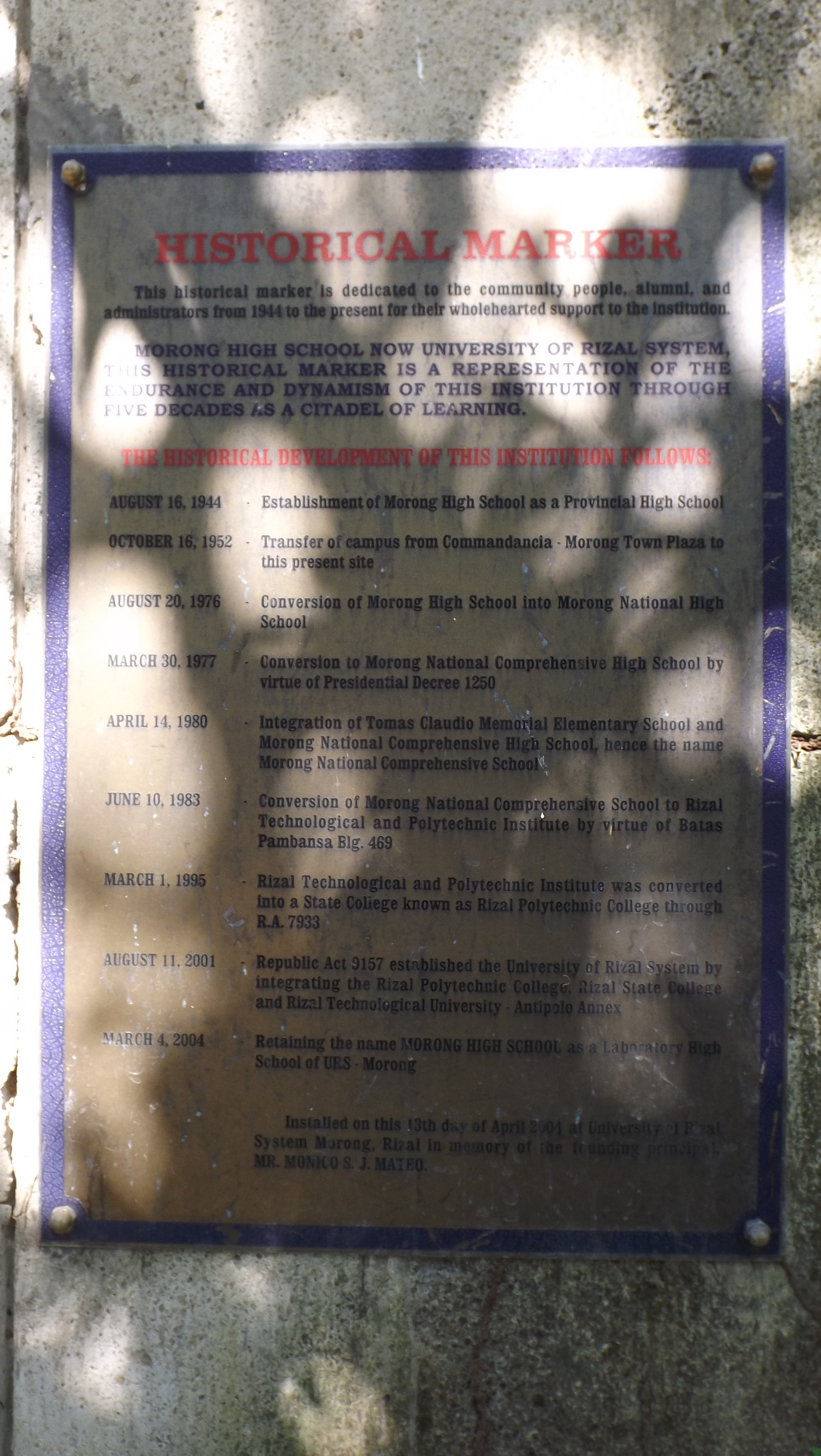
Historical Marker

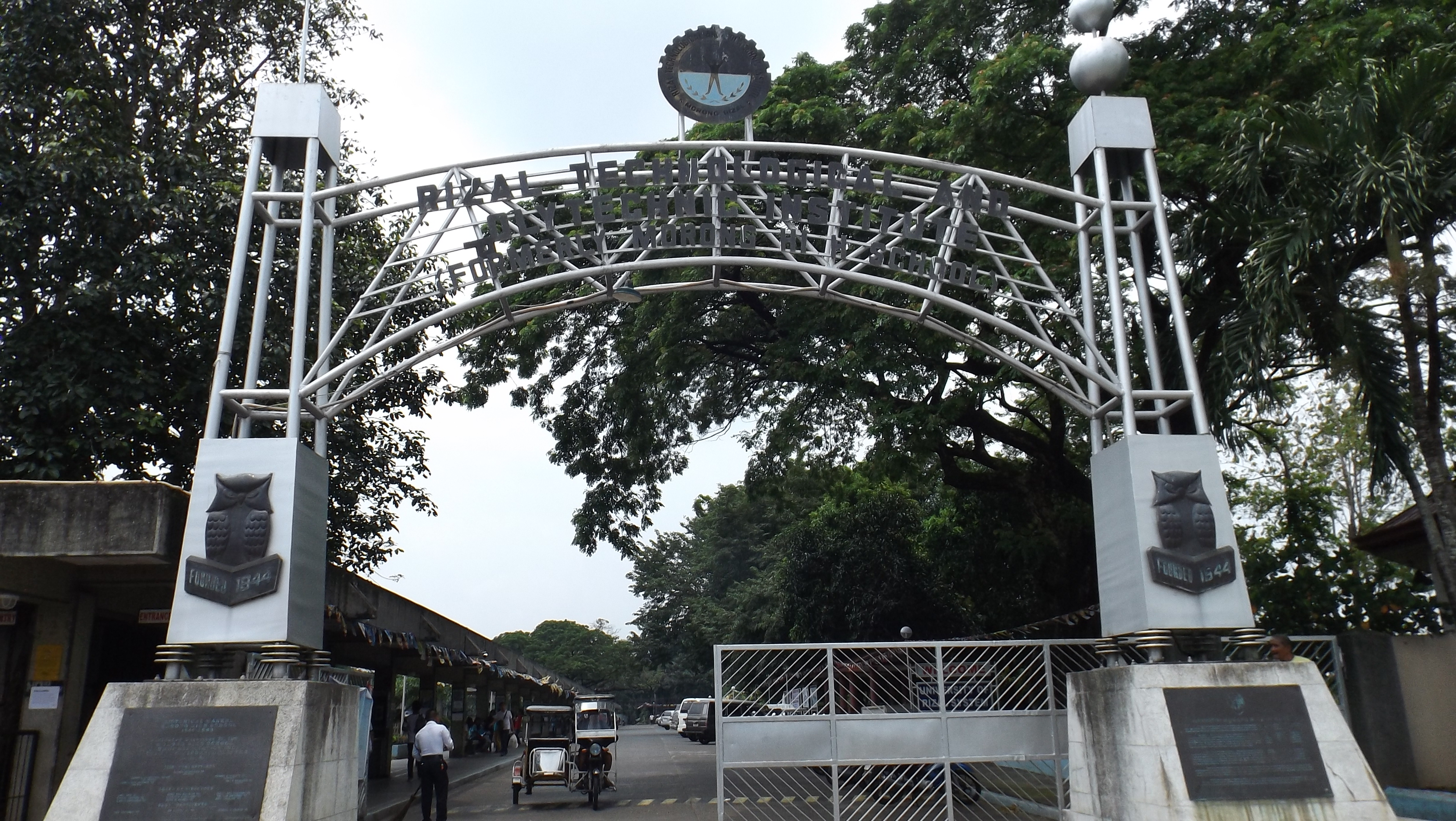
Arch Tower which reads "University of Rizal System Former Morong High School"

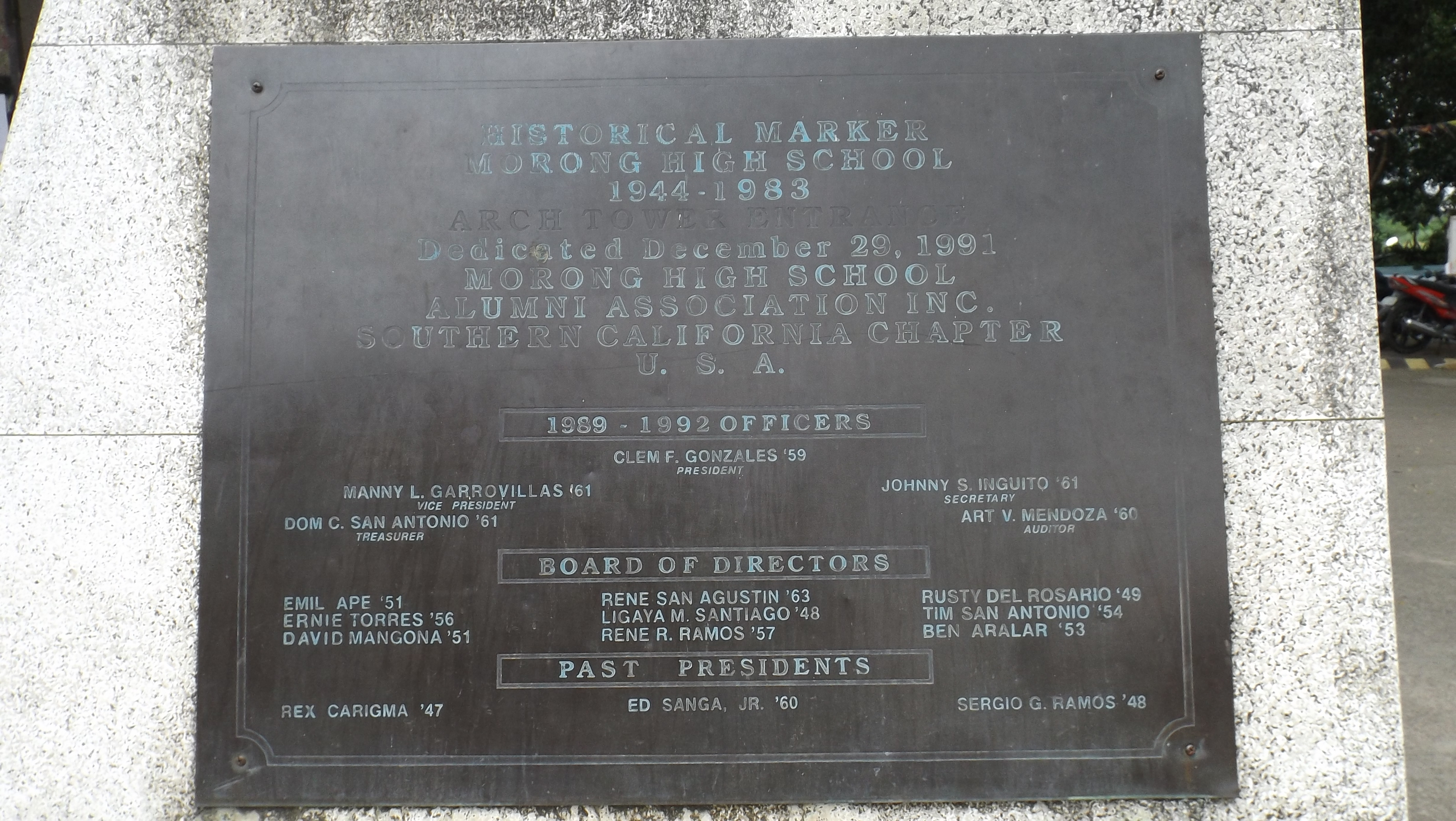
Historical Marker on Arch Tower

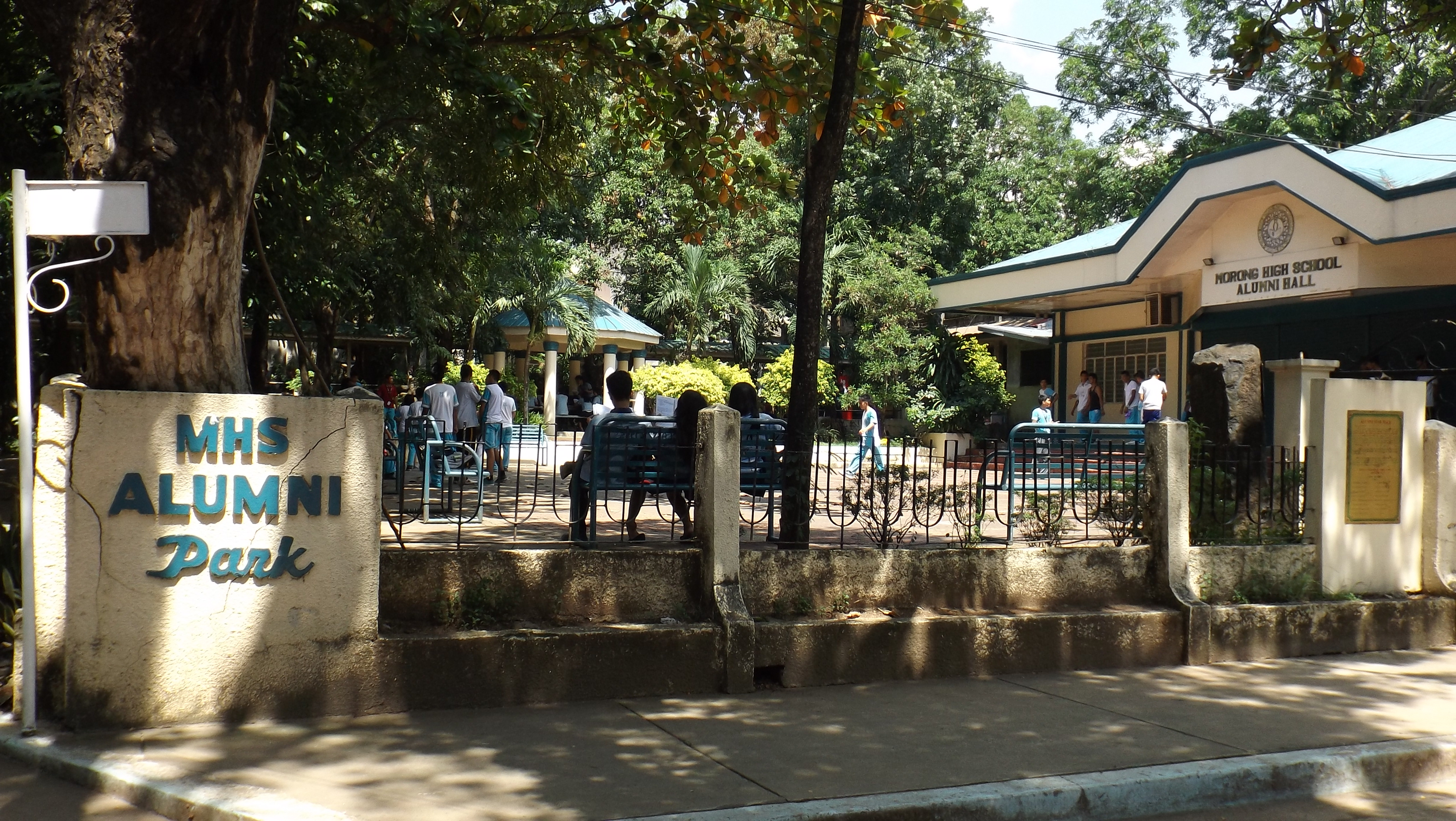
Alumni Park and Hall

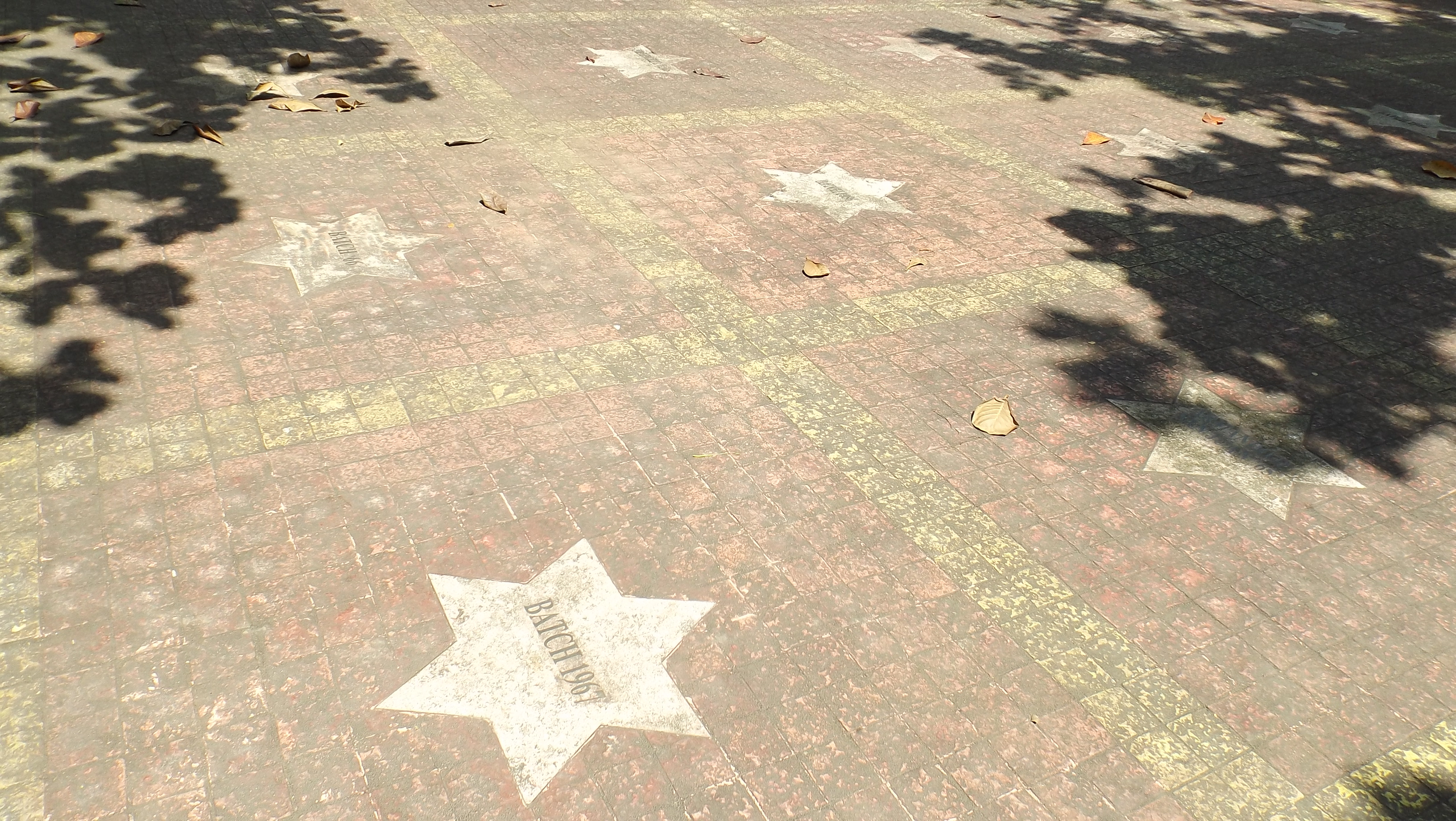
Alumni Walk

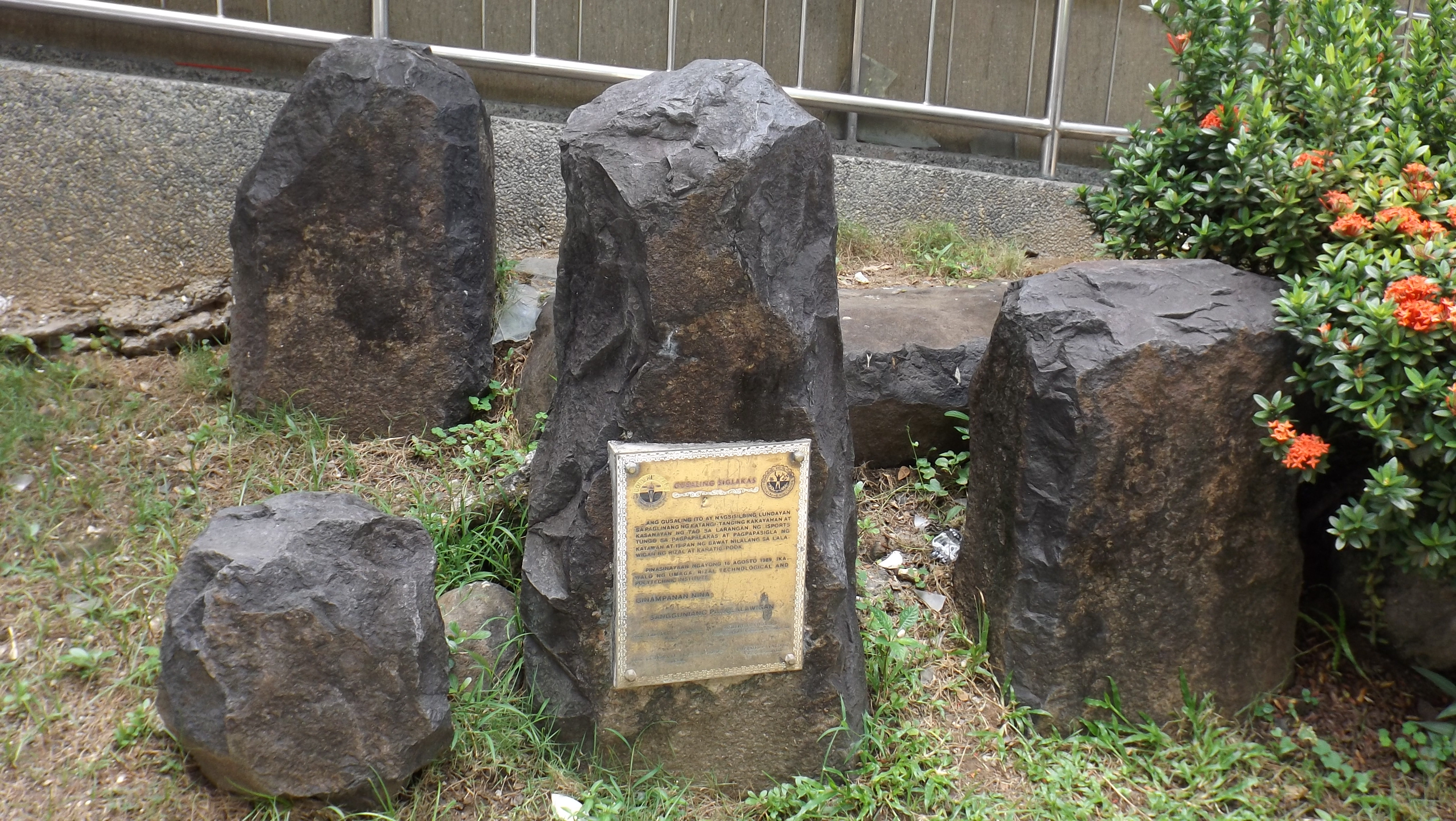
Ruby Jubilee Year Commemorative Marker
