= Casa de Segunda =

Historic house museum in Batangas, Philippines

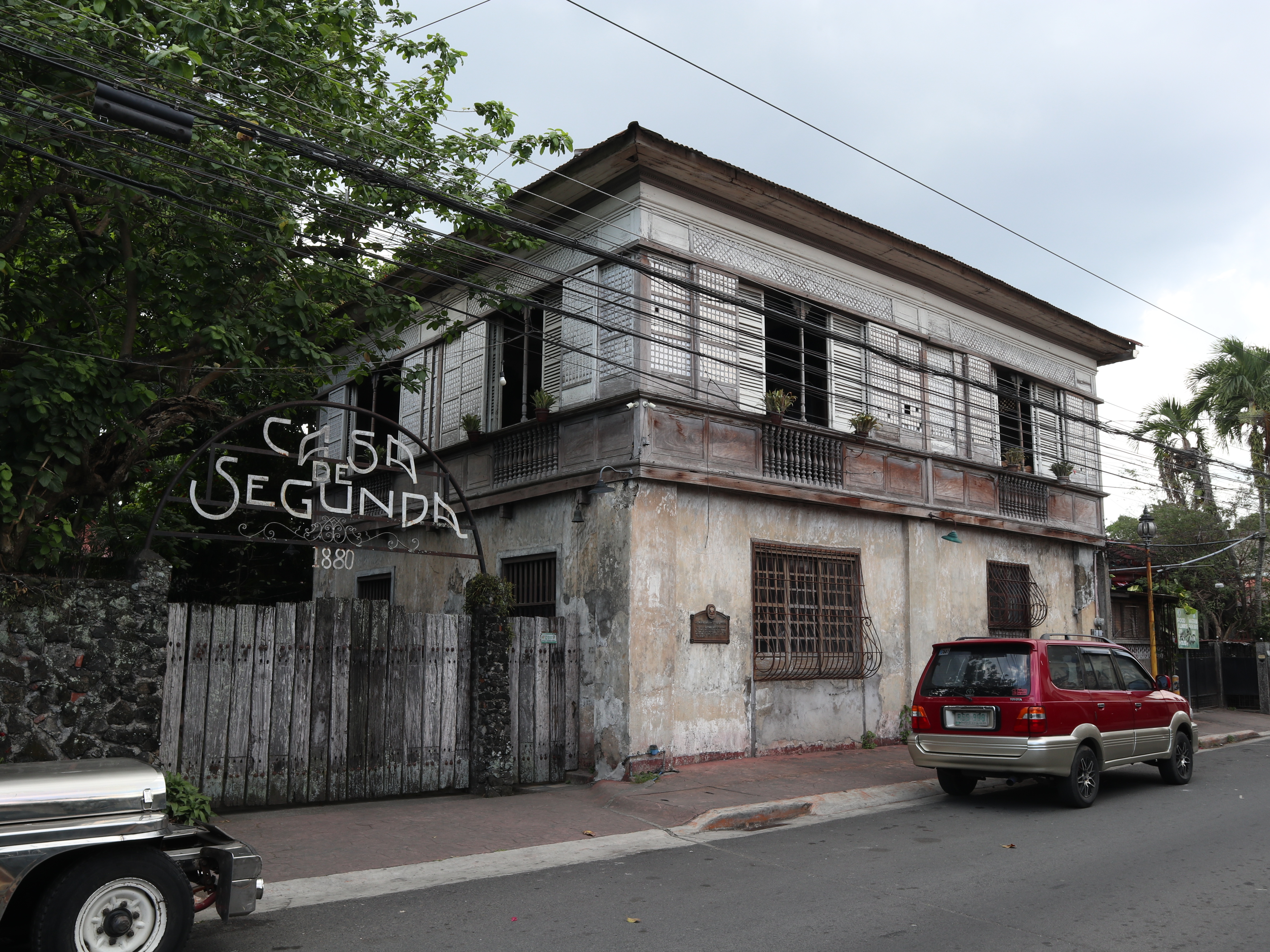
- Facade
- Interactive map of the Casa de Segunda area
- Alternative names: Luz–Katigbak House

General information
- Status: National Heritage House
- Type: Single-detached
- Architectural style: Bahay na Bato
- Location: Lipa, Batangas, Philippines
- Coordinates: 13°56′20″N 121°09′42″E
- Construction started: 1860s
- Renovated: 1956

Technical details
- Material: Stones and Wood
- Floor count: Two

Design and construction
- Architect: Renovated by Paz Luz-Dimayuga in 1956

The Casa de Segunda, also known as Luz–Katigbak House, is a heritage house museum located along Rizal Street, Lipa City, Batangas. It was built during the 1860s and owned by Don Manuel Mitra de San Miguel-Luz and Doña Segunda Solis Katigbak, Dr. José Rizal's first love. The house was repaired in 1956 by Paz Luz-Dimayuga and was eventually declared a national heritage house by the National Historic Institute. At present, the house was converted into a museum.

== History ==
Luz–Katigbak House was one of the houses built by Don Norberto Calao Katigbak, a gobernadorcillo, from 1862 to 1863. Katigbaks were one of the prolific families in the province - attributing part of their wealth to the coffee industry, being one of the major business ventures before. He was known to own big parcels of land in Batangas. He was married to Doña Justa Mitra de San Miguel-Solis. The house was Don Katigbak's gift to his daughter, Doña Segunda Solis Katigbak.

José Rizal met Doña Segunda Solis Katigbak through his sister, Olimpia Rizal. She was one of the classmates of Doña Segunda Katigbak at Colegio de la Concordia in Santa Ana, Manila. Segunda's older brother, Don Mariano Solis-Katigbak, became close friends with Rizal, as well. However, Segunda was already betrothed with Don Manuel Mitra de San Miguel-Luz, coming from a wealthy family in Lipa, Batangas. Eventually, Don Manuel and Doña Segunda got married, with nine children. The Luz–Katigbaks were known at the province as a family of scholars, political leaders, professionals and artists. One of its descendants is Arturo R. Luz, a National Artist for Visual Arts.

== Architectural features ==
The fountain, fishpond, and the orchard serve as the focal point of the courtyard upon reaching the house. The zaguan serves as the receiving area for the visitors of the museum, featuring information materials, copy of a portrait of Segunda, copy of the portrait of her parents, photographs of the families of the Luz–Katigbak heirs, and cultural artifacts. Its flooring retained the black-and-white machuca tiles despite the partial damage caused by the bombing of Lipa during the World War II.

The Luz–Katigbak House was originally built on a square plan, with the terrace, or azotea, extending it into an L-shaped plan. Balusters were restored to protect the open portion of the azotea. The adobe wall at the ground floor was plastered with lime mortar. The area below the azotea was converted into a dining area, or comedor, with the view of the focal points of the courtyard such as the quatrefoil-shaped fountain and a replica of a 19th-century house, which was occupied by one of the Luz–Katigbak heirs.

The main staircase leads up to the living room at the second floor. Its flooring were made out of narra planks. Window openings surround the three sides of the room, furnished with 19th century furniture. The wood and capiz sliding windows protect the room from rain water, without blocking the sunlight while persiana panels serves as the second layer of the windows, providing ample protection from sunlight. Below the window sills, or the pasamano are ventanillas with balusters, drawing up the prevailing breeze inside the house. The transom, or the upper part of the window, protected by wood and capiz panels in a diagonal pattern, maintain a soft lighting in the house.

The bedrooms are located on both sides of the staircase. The master's bedroom is furnished with a carved narra bed, accentuated with crocheted bed fineries and pieces of furniture. There were mannequins, dressed in traditional Filipino clothes previously worn by Segunda, on the remaining bedrooms.

== Present condition ==
The Luz–Katigbak House was repaired in 1956 by Paz Luz-Dimayuga. She serves as one of the caretakers of the house museum. The present heiresses, the great-granddaughters of Doña Segunda Katigbak-Luz, maintain and manage the house, as well as Ms. Lileth Malabanan, who lives nearby the Casa de Segunda.

=== Marker from the National Historical Commission of the Philippines ===
Luz–Katigbak Ancestral House
THIS IS A HERITAGE HOUSE PURSUANT TO BOARD RESOLUTION NO. 4, SERIES OF 1996 OF THE NATIONAL HISTORICAL INSTITUTE OF THE REPUBLIC OF THE PHILIPPINES.
