= Bahay na bato =

Style of Philippine house architecture

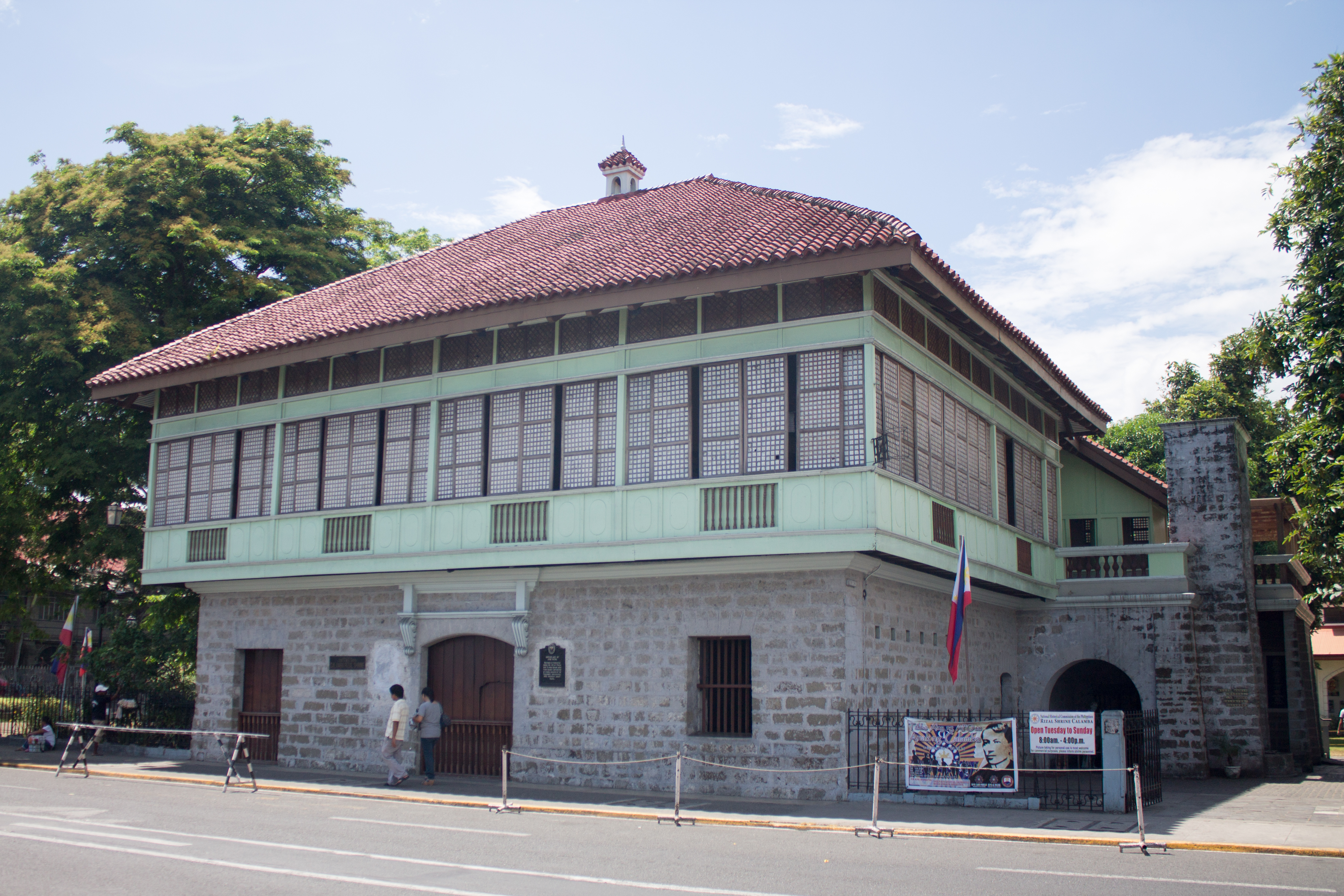
The Rizal Shrine in Calamba is an example of bahay na bato.

Báhay na bató (Filipino for "stone house"), also known in Visayan as baláy na bató or balay nga bato, is a traditional Philippine architectural style originating from the Spanish colonial period of the Philippines (1565–1898) It was popular among the ruling upper-class (principalía) and middle-class families in the 19th to early 20th centuries. Báhay na bató are also commonly referred to as "ancestral houses", due to it being the most common style for surviving ancestral family homes.

It is also referred to as arquitectura mestiza ("mixed architecture") due to it being composed of both wood and stone. It has certain elements similar to the bahay kubo, which is adapted to the tropical climate and the frequent typhoons and earthquakes in the Philippine islands.

Báhay na bató is built in a hybrid style of Tropical and Spanish architecture; and later, also early 20th-century American architecture. Instead of using an open ground layout, this design enclosed the lower wooden frame within thick stone or brick walls. This created a solid, forming a "ground floor" (the silong). This enclosed ground level contains storage rooms, stables (the cuadras or caballerizas), carriage storage areas (the zaguan), cellars, and workshops. The silong is accessed through a large main entrance known as the puerto, which has one or two smaller inset doors for foot traffic known as postigos.

The upper floor is accessed by internal stairs (escaleras), and it contains the actual living areas, as it is with the bahay kubo. The upper story is characteristically overhanging the silong and features balustrades (ventanillas) and capiz-shell sliding windows.

The roof materials are either Spanish-style curving clay tiles (teja de curva) or thatched with leaves (like nipa, sago palm, or cogon). Later 19th-century designs feature galvanized iron roofs. Roof designs are traditionally high pitched, with gables or hip roofs, or a traditional combination of both (similar to the East Asian hip-and-gable roof).

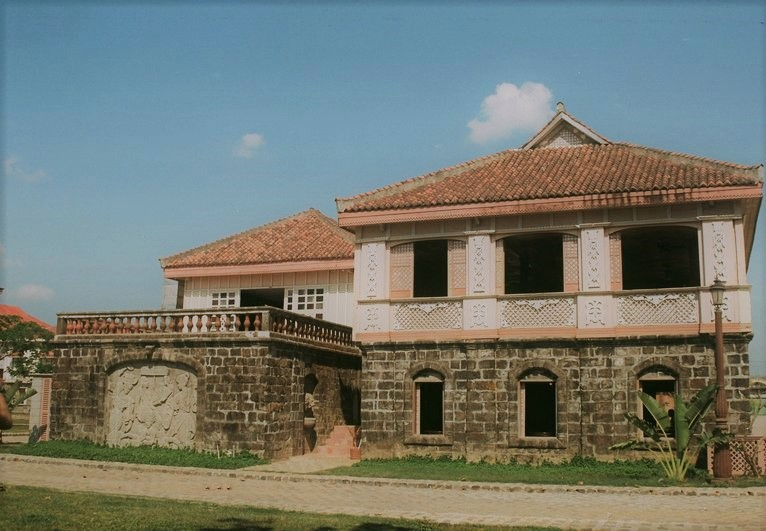
An example of bahay na bato Philippine architecture

Aside from houses, the same architectural style was also used for Spanish-era convents, monasteries, schools, hotels, factories, and hospitals. It was also used for the Gabaldon school buildings, during the American colonial period of Philippines (1898–1946). After the Second World War, construction of these buildings declined and eventually stopped in favor of post-World War II modern architecture.

== Etymology ==
Though the Filipino term bahay na bato means "house of stone", these houses are not entirely made up of stone; some are dominated by wooden materials, while some more modern ones use concrete, in contrast to the organic materials that make up the bahay kubo. The name bahay na bato was applied to the architecture over generations.

Bahay na bato were also referred to as arquitectura mestiza ("mixed architecture") by the Jesuit priest Ignacio Alzina in 1668 due to it being composed of both wood and stone.

== History ==
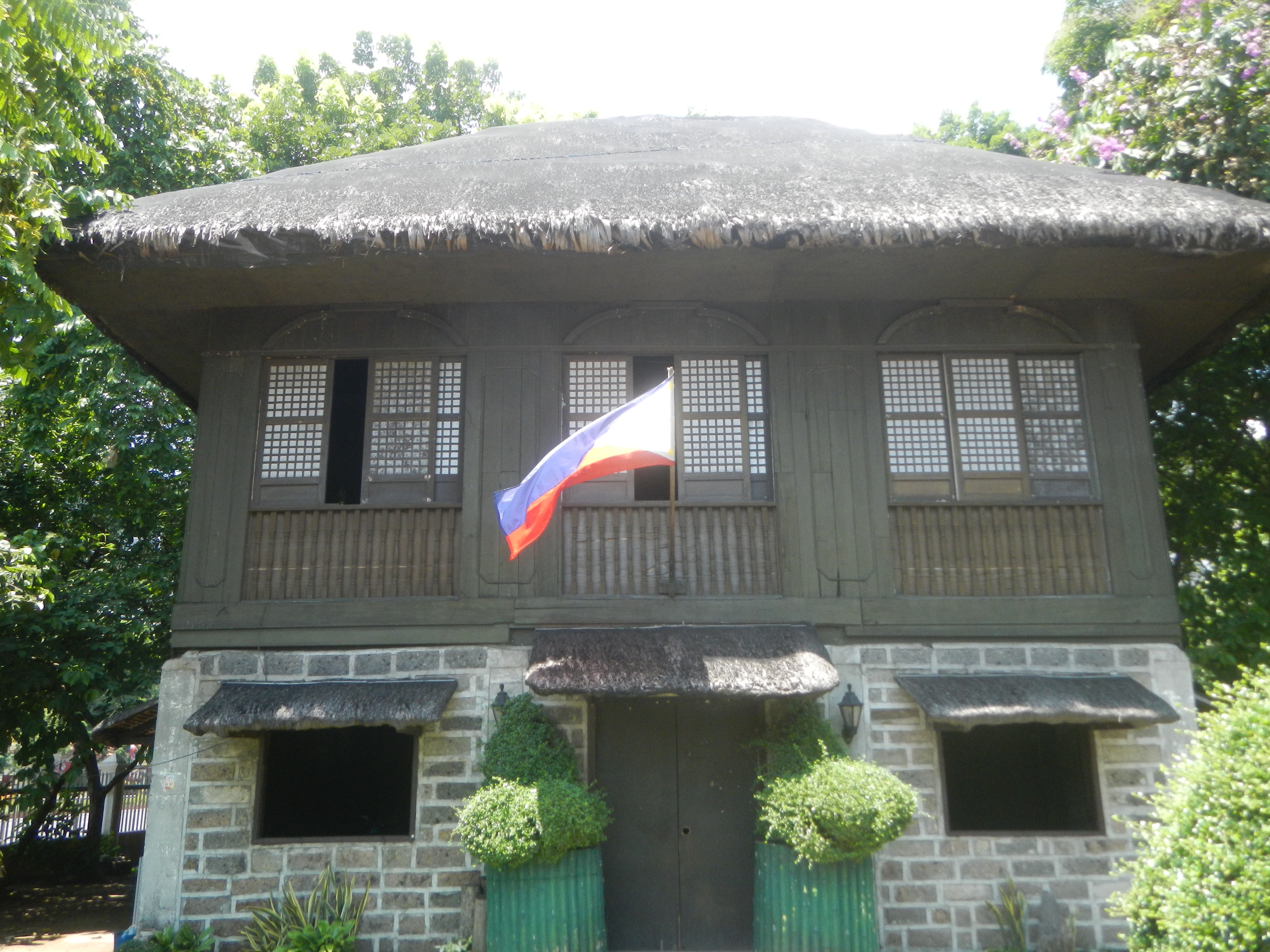
House in Luneta with thatch roof

Precolonial Philippine architecture is based on traditional stilt houses of the Austronesian people of Southeast Asia. The first buildings during the early years of Spanish occupation were Bahay kubo which are made of wood and bamboo materials. It is a type of construction with which the pre-Hispanic indigenous Filipinos had been working expertly since early times and is known as Austronesian architecture. Bahay kubo roofs were made of nipa palm or cogon grass. In its most basic form, the house consisted of four walls enclosing one or more rooms, with the whole structure raised above ground on stilts.

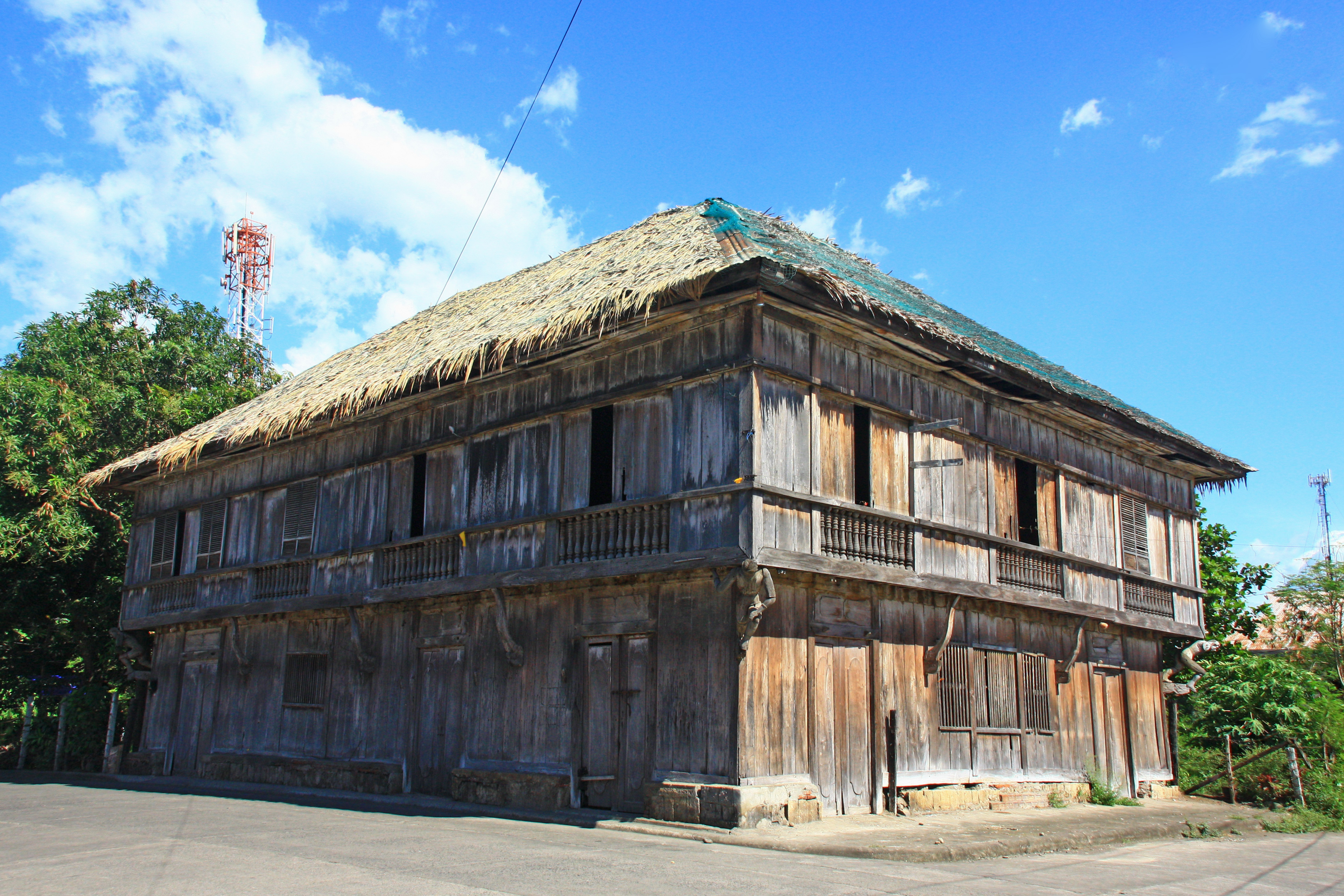
Vega Ancestral House Spanish colonial-era nipa mansion, a "1st transition bahay na bato style" house in Poblacion, Balingasag, Misamis Oriental, Mindanao, known for its sculpted wooden Atlases.

When Spaniards arrived, they quickly introduced Spanish architecture of building a more permanent construction traditions which they inherited from the Romans. They thus began building communities with the church and government as focal points. By the mid-1580s, through the efforts of Domingo Salazar, the first bishop of Manila, and of the Jesuit Antonio Sedeño, edifices began to be constructed of stone. Fr. Sedeño built the first stone building, which was the residence of Bishop Salazar.

By 1587, Governor General Santiago de Vera required all buildings in Manila to be built of stone. For this purpose, the indigenous Filipinos were taught how to quarry and dress stone, prepare and use mortar, and mould bricks. Thus began what has been called the first golden age of building in stone. This new community setup made construction heavier and more permanent materials desirable. Some of these materials included bricks, mortar, tiles, and stone. Heavily favored accounts of towering palaces and splendid mansions reached the peninsula. However, the ambitious plans of the Spaniards were dashed in 1645 when a terrible earthquake struck Manila.

The twin dangers of fire and earthquake gave rise to another type of architecture. Finding European construction styles impractical in local conditions, Spanish and Filipino builders quickly adapted the characteristics of the bahay kubo of the natives and applied it to Spanish Colonial architecture. This type of construction was soon called bahay na bato. It was also called arquitectura mestiza ("mixed architecture") by the Jesuit priest Ignacio Alzina due to it being composed of both wood and stone. Under more than three centuries of Spanish initiative, buildings of wood, stone, and brick were constructed all over the archipelago, from the Batanes Islands in the north to Tawi-Tawi in the south, from Palawan in the west to Samar in the east.

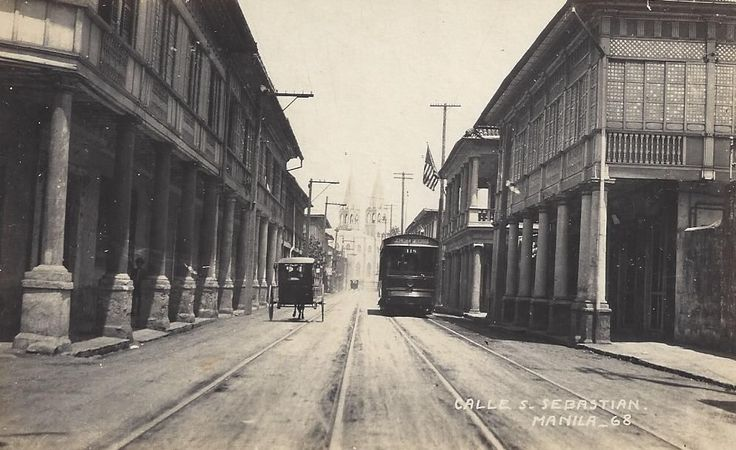
Pre-World War II Calle Sebastian (now Hidalgo Street; with the San Sebastian Church in the background), once dubbed as the most beautiful street in Manila. Manila during the early 1900s was filled with bahay na bato architecture on its streets.

During World War II, the American and Japanese forces destroyed many of these houses.

== Styles ==
Different styles depend on each house's individual appearance. For example, some bahay na bato do not have ventanillas, some do not have Capiz windows, and some lack both. Some have galvanized, tiled, nipa, or cogon roofs. Ground-level walls may be made of bricks, adobe, coral, or wood, although modern structures typically use concrete. While retaining the basic form, the 19th-century bahay na bato reflected changing tastes by incorporating motifs from other prevalent styles.

Houses such as the Vega Ancestral House that have emerging stone works at the bottom part of the house but have almost wooden materials appearance even to the first level walls are still considered bahay na bato; the name bahay na bato was applied to this architecture over generations, as most of these houses use stone materials, contrary to the precolonial era that used little to no stones at all. The same principle applies to the nipa hut: not all nipa huts use nipa materials; some use cogon.

Though many houses are built in a standard design, many houses are also mixed, arranged, patterned and/or coated with a variety of designs from different architectural styles and cultures connected to the Philippines. This is including Chinese, Romanesque and Classical styles among others. These houses could have an unprecedented mixing and matching of architectural styles, such as having Neogothic and Neo-Mudéjar or Moorish Revival details in the same corners – that is, on top of Baroque. Although retaining its basic form, the 19th-century bahay na bato reflected changing tastes through the incorporation of motifs from prevalent styles such as Victorian, Renaissance Revival and Neoclassical decorations which included columns, pilasters, caryatids, atlases and friezes adopted from Greco-Roman architecture, the civilizations from which Spanish culture descend. Classical traditions in these houses also appear in Beaux-Arts later in history. The dawn of Art Nouveau also greatly influenced the mixing of styles and aesthetics of these houses. Many later bahay na bato buildings adapted design styles, such as Art Deco during the latter era of American rule, and even through the postwar period of loose restoration. The mixing of so many different architectural styles give the bahay na bato a distinct look that is reflective of the Philippines' unified cultures and society.

=== Regional variants ===
The style of bahay na bato may also vary by area. Each region evolved its own building style, which was in many cases dependent on the materials available. As construction techniques were developed, quarries opened, and kilns constructed, various parts of the country began to show a preference for specific building materials. As a result, bahay na bato have several variations along ethnic lines. The bahay na bato in Cebu, for example, differs from the one in Ilocos which may include having the façade walls of the second level made up of plastered bricks, but still embedded with a Bahay kubo wooden skeletal frame. This style is also present, albeit rarer, outside the north, but with the use of adobe or coral stones instead of northern tradition of brick materials. The more common style is having a wooden second level façade popular in the rest of the country outside the north.

==== Metro Manila ====
Manila, the capital of the Philippines, has some of the most diverse styles and materials of bahay na bato, ranging from the early period of Spanish colonization to the American era. Many were destroyed by World War II. The Metro Manila area still has one of the largest concentrations of bahay na bato houses. Most buildings in Manila and Central Luzon were of adobe, a volcanic tuff quarried from the hills, which is entirely different from materials of the same name found in Latin America (adobe in those Hispanic countries refers to mud and straw formed into rectangular blocks which are then dried in the sun).

In Manila, the largest, fanciest, and most prestigious companies eventually established themselves along the Escolta; by the second half of the 19th century it was the most important commercial district in the country. The opening of Manila as a free port encouraged British people, Germans, French people, and other foreigners to set up businesses on the Escolta and adjacent streets, causing many majestic bahay na bato buildings to be built.

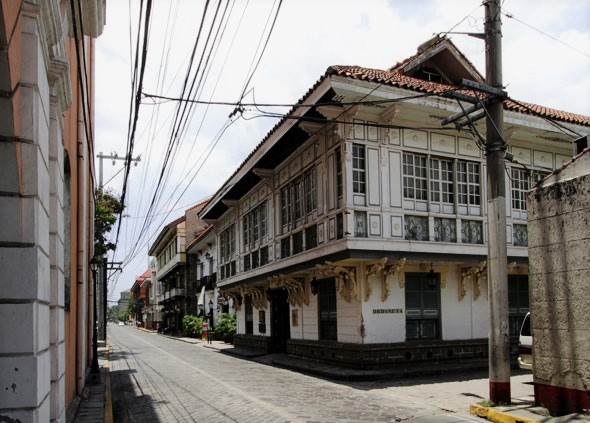
Inside the old walled city of Intramuros.

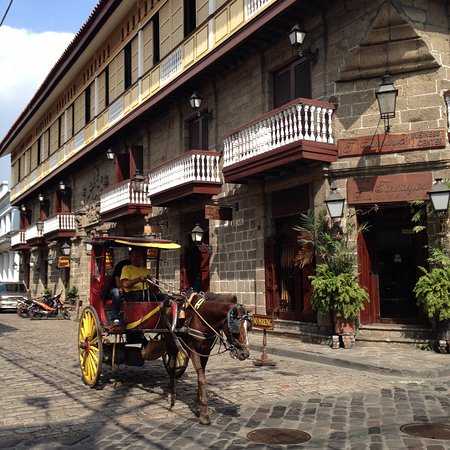
Casa Manila, Intramuros.

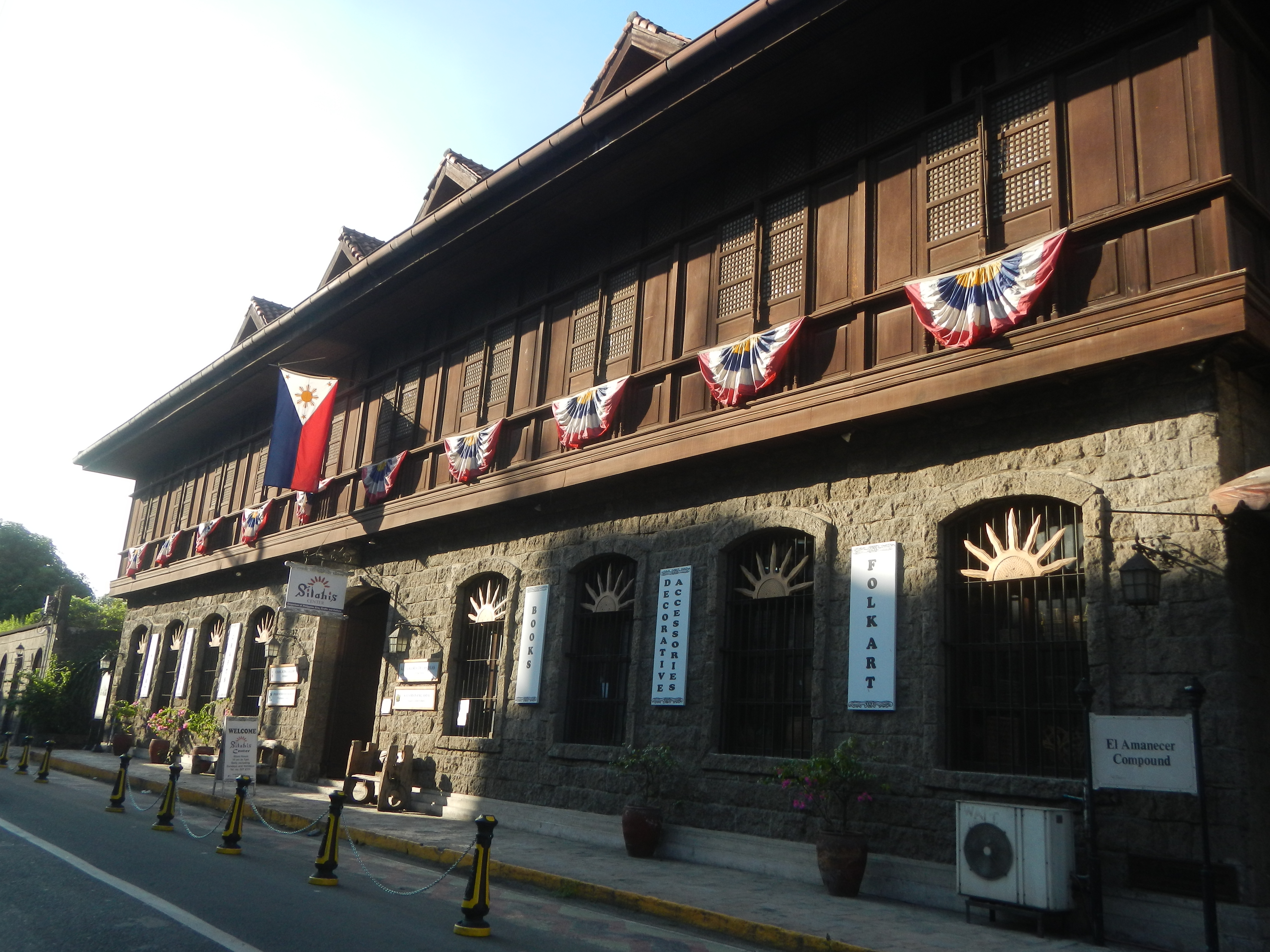
Silahis center, Intramuros

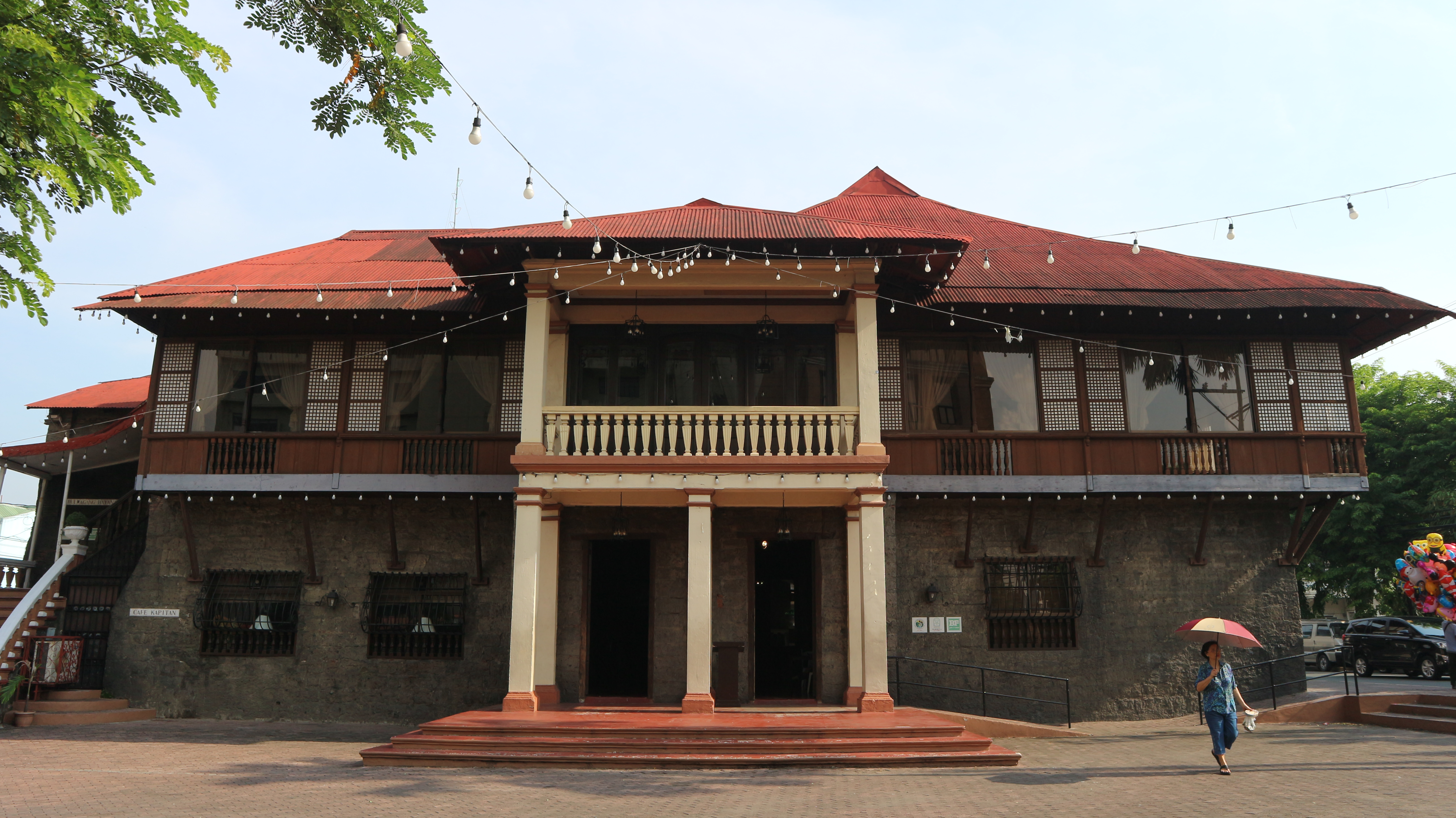
Kapitan Moy ancestral house, Marikina.

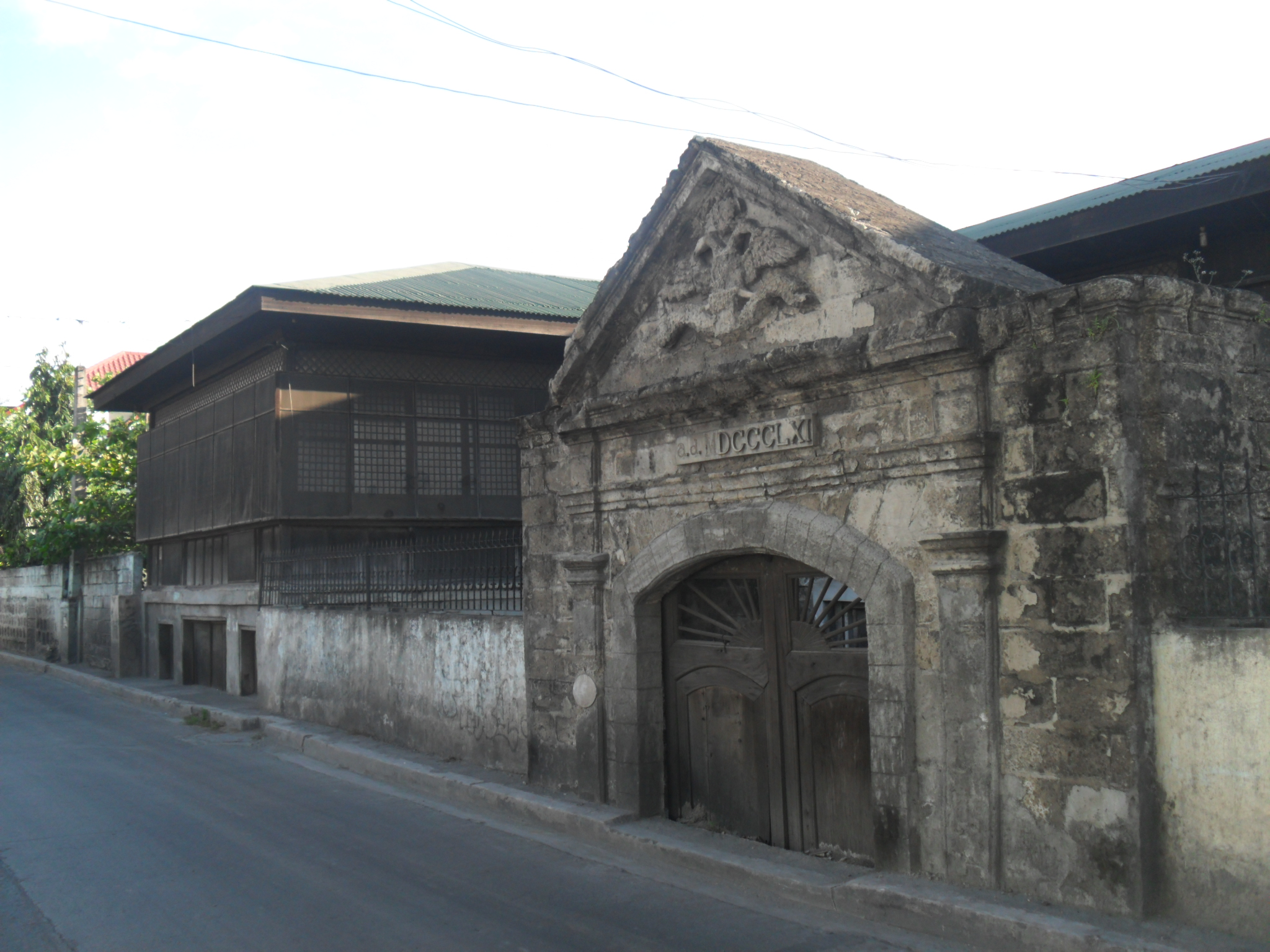
Raymundo ancestral house.

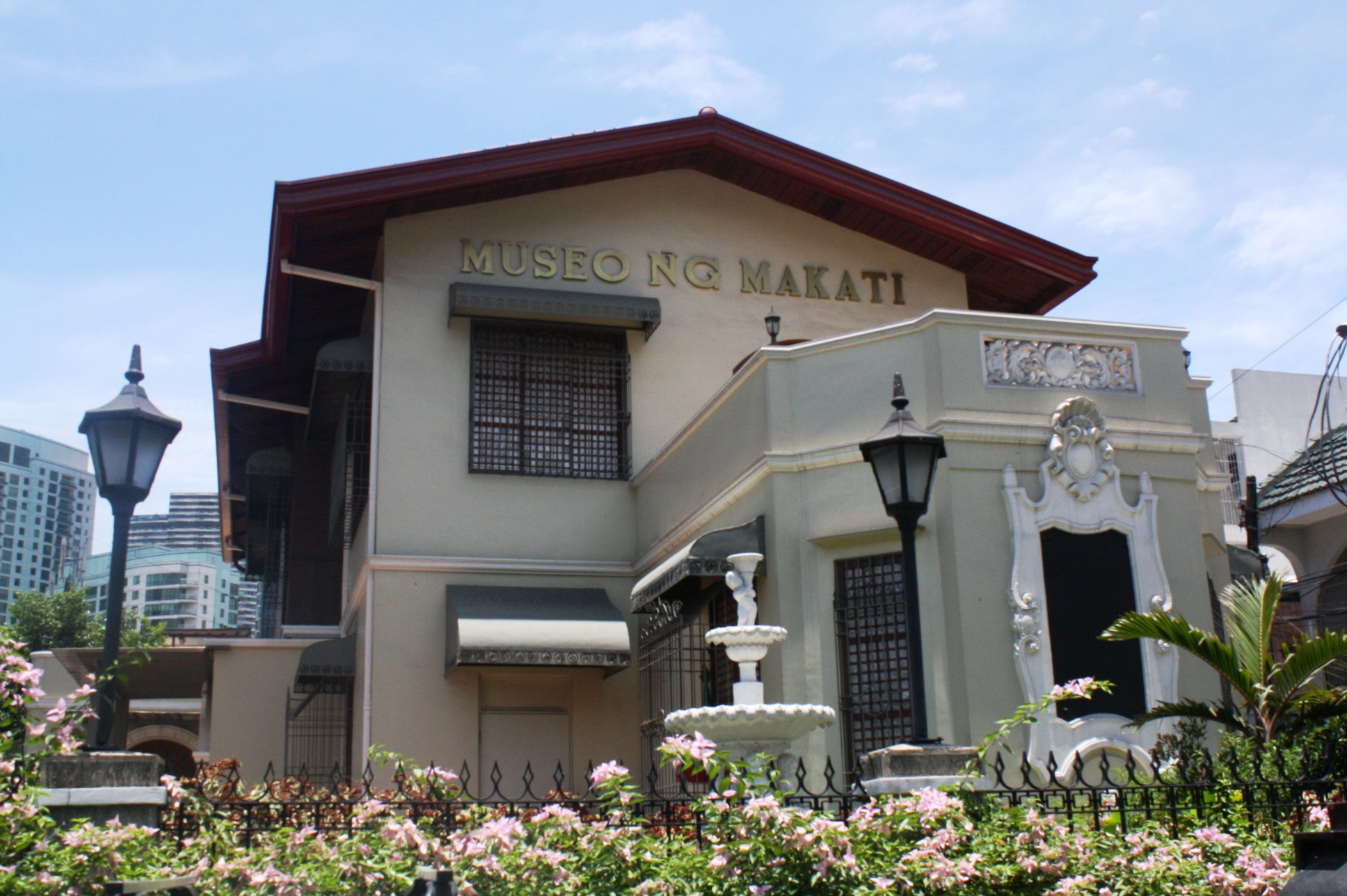
Museo ng Makati

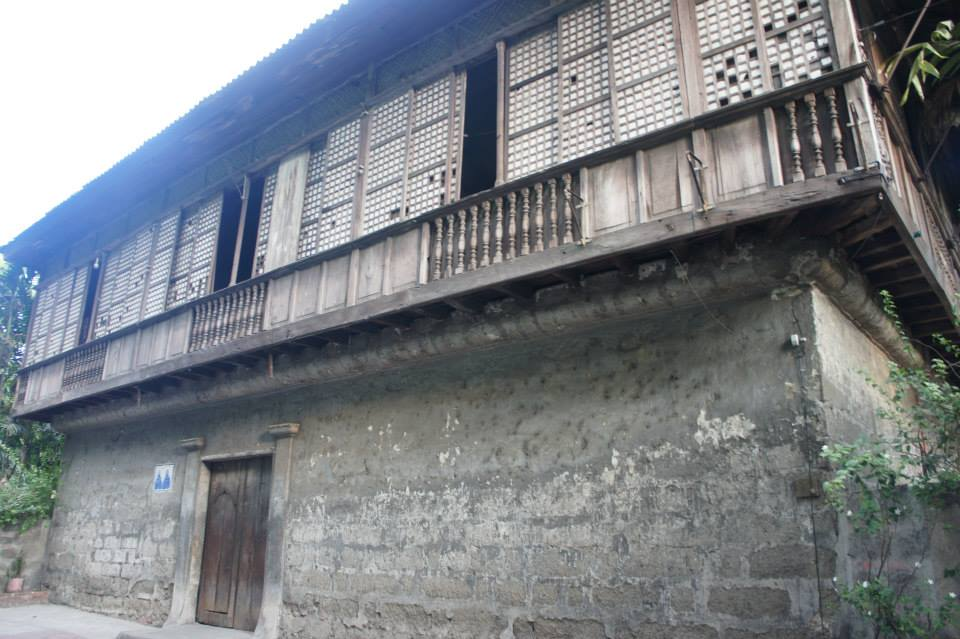
Bahay na Tisa, Pasig

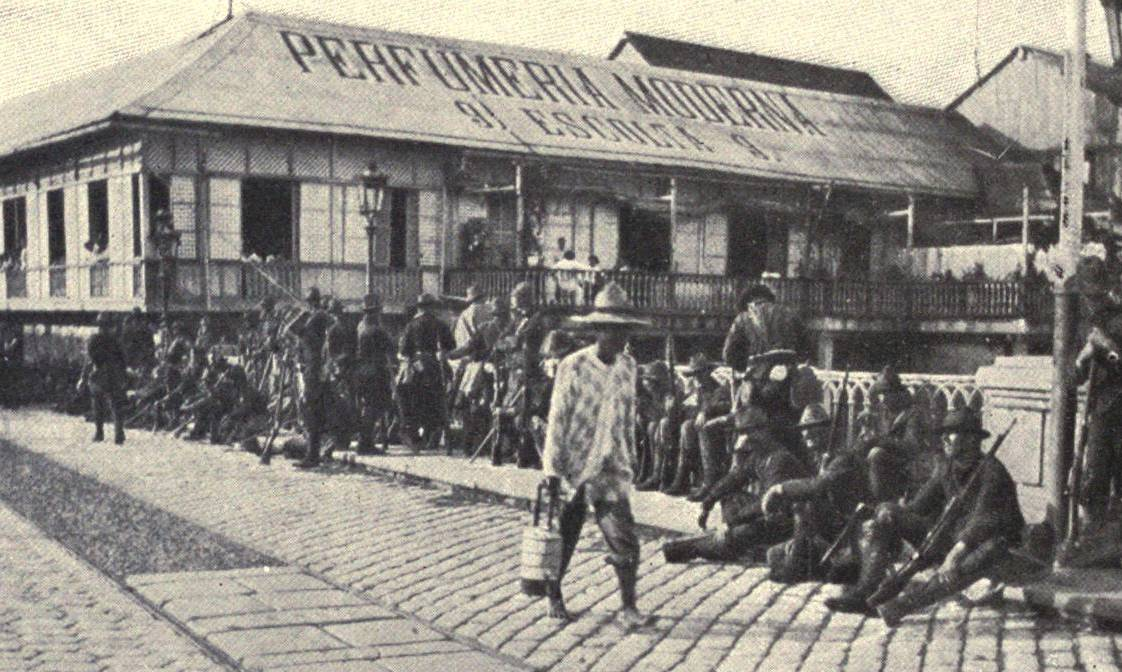
A perfume factory built in the bahay na bato style along the Escolta.

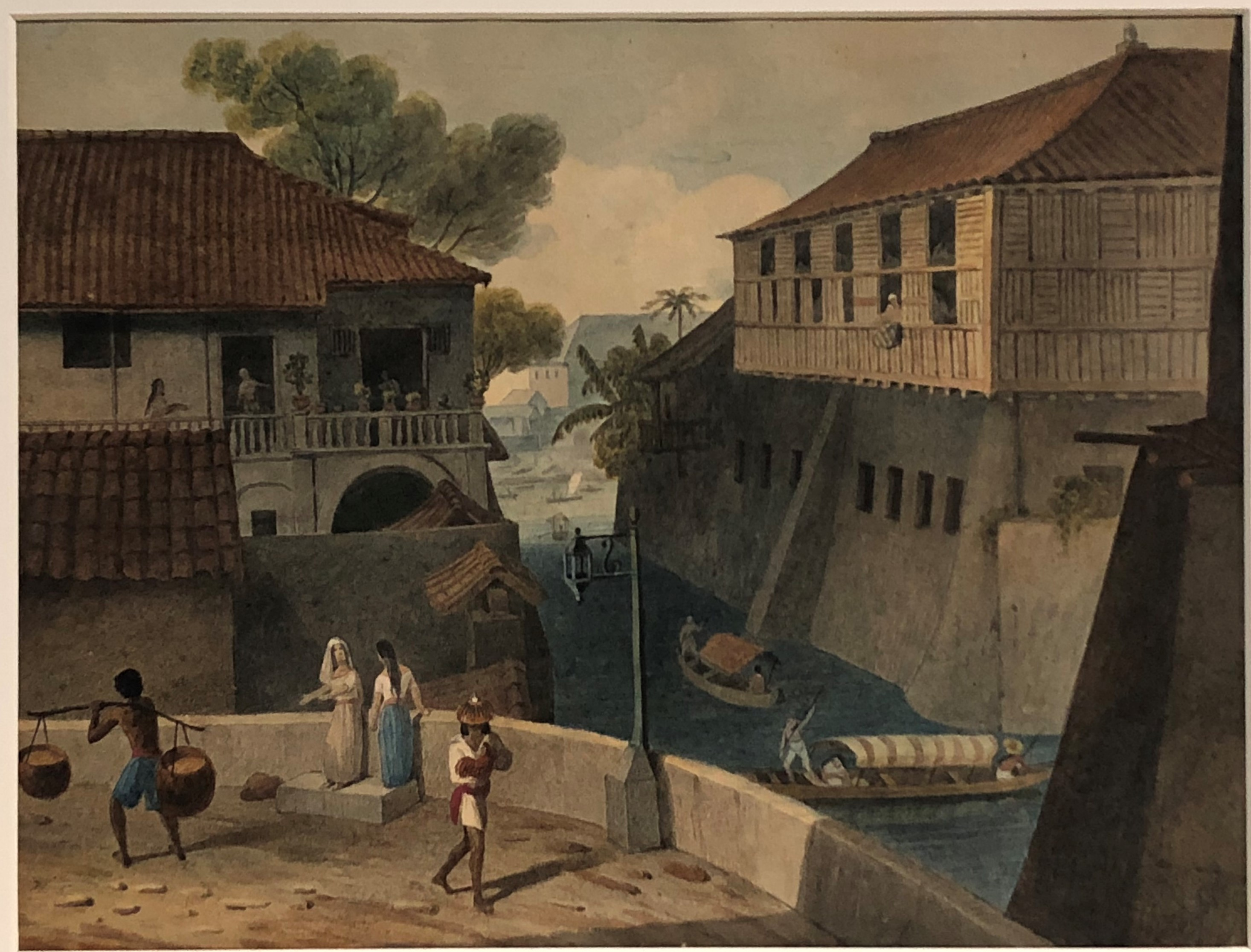
A Manila canal lined with bahay na bato.

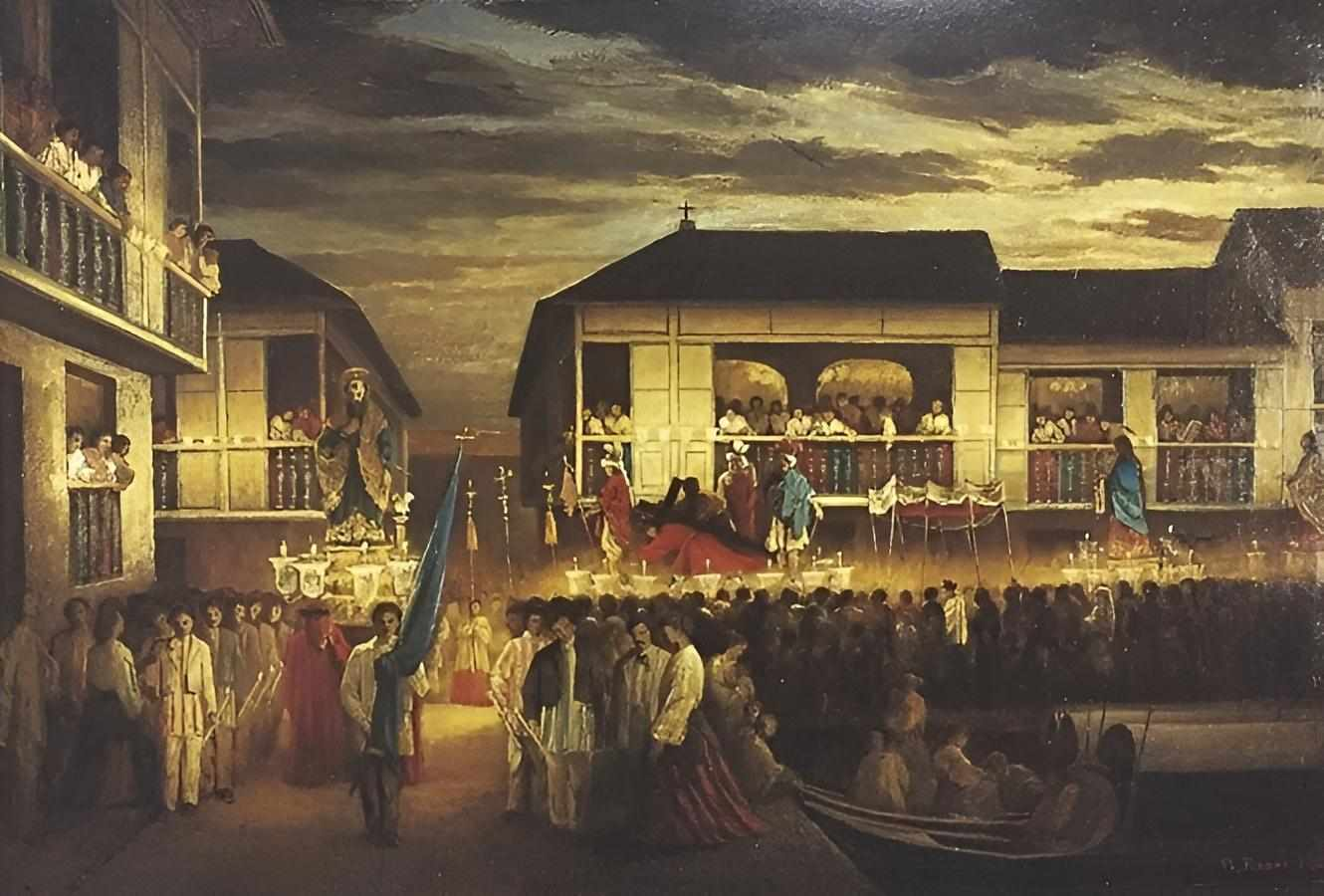
Religious procession in Manila, With houses' windows completely opened so residents could participate with the event.

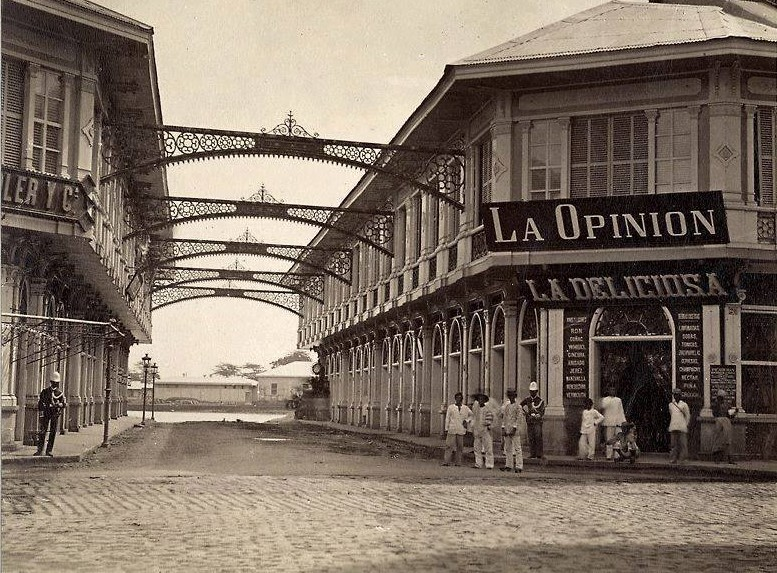
Streets of Manila early 1900s.

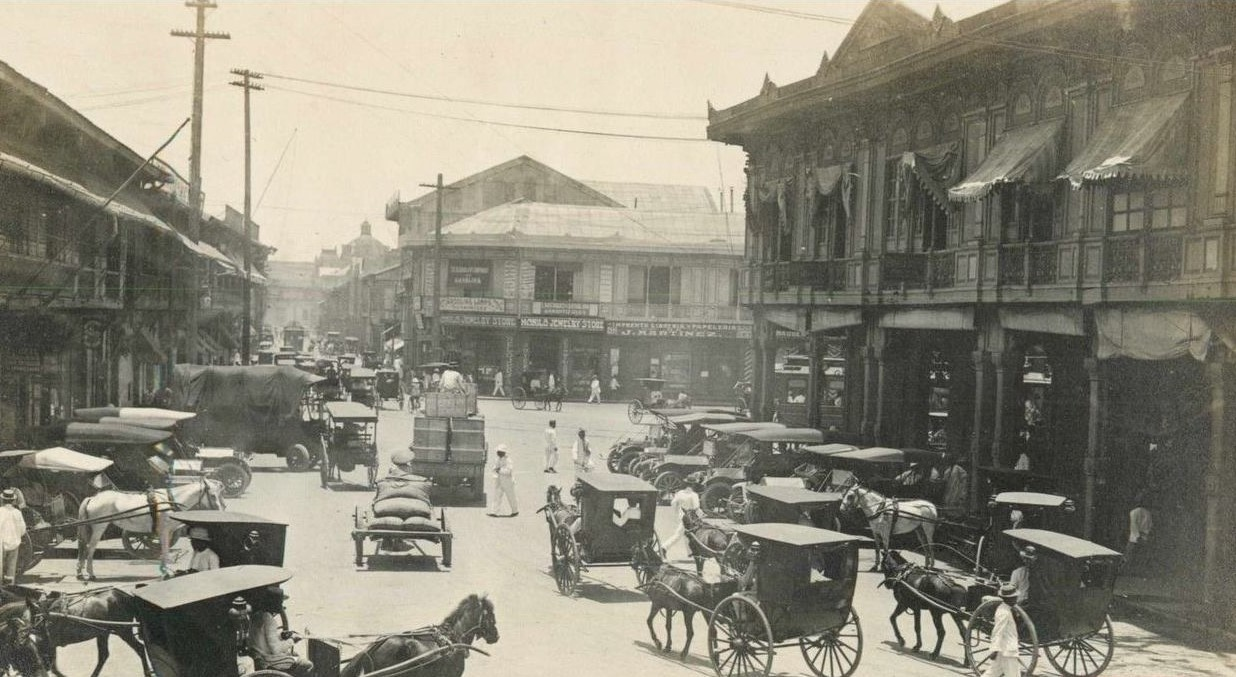
Plaza Moraga, Manila

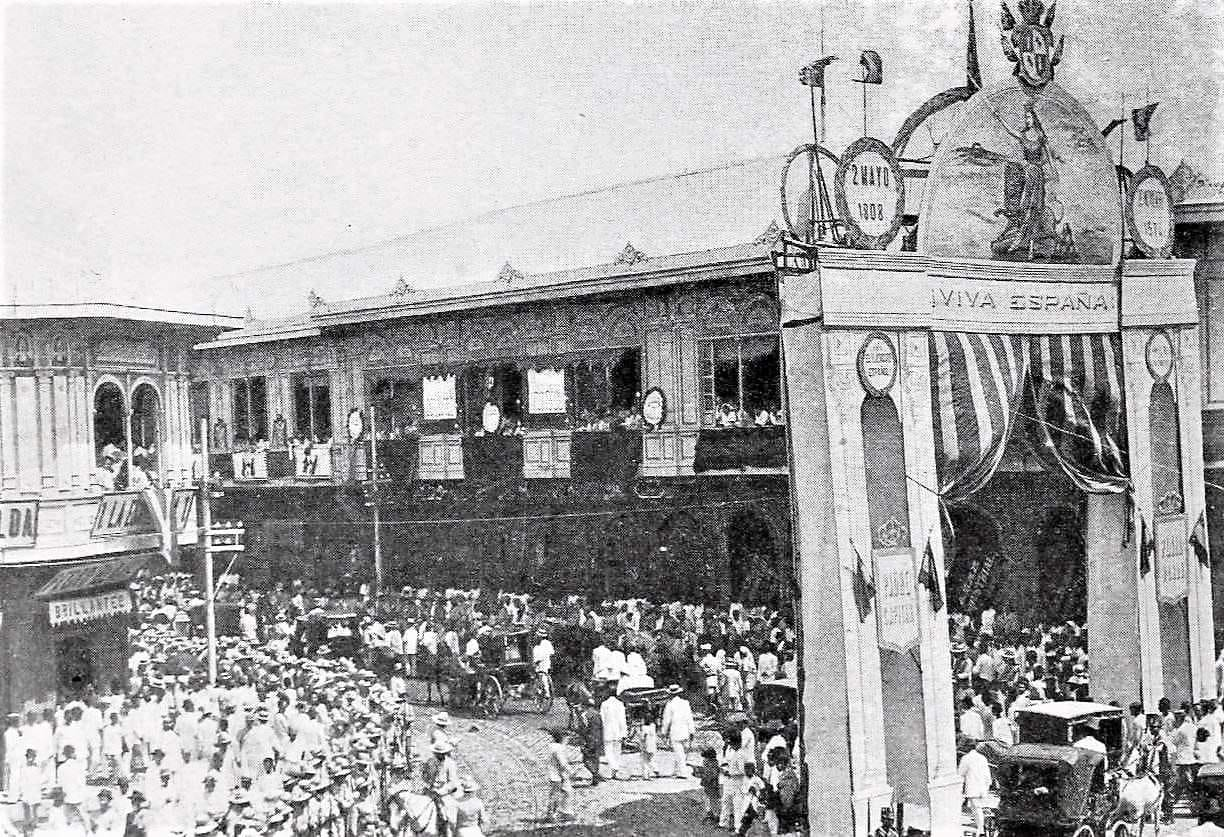
Escolta, Manila

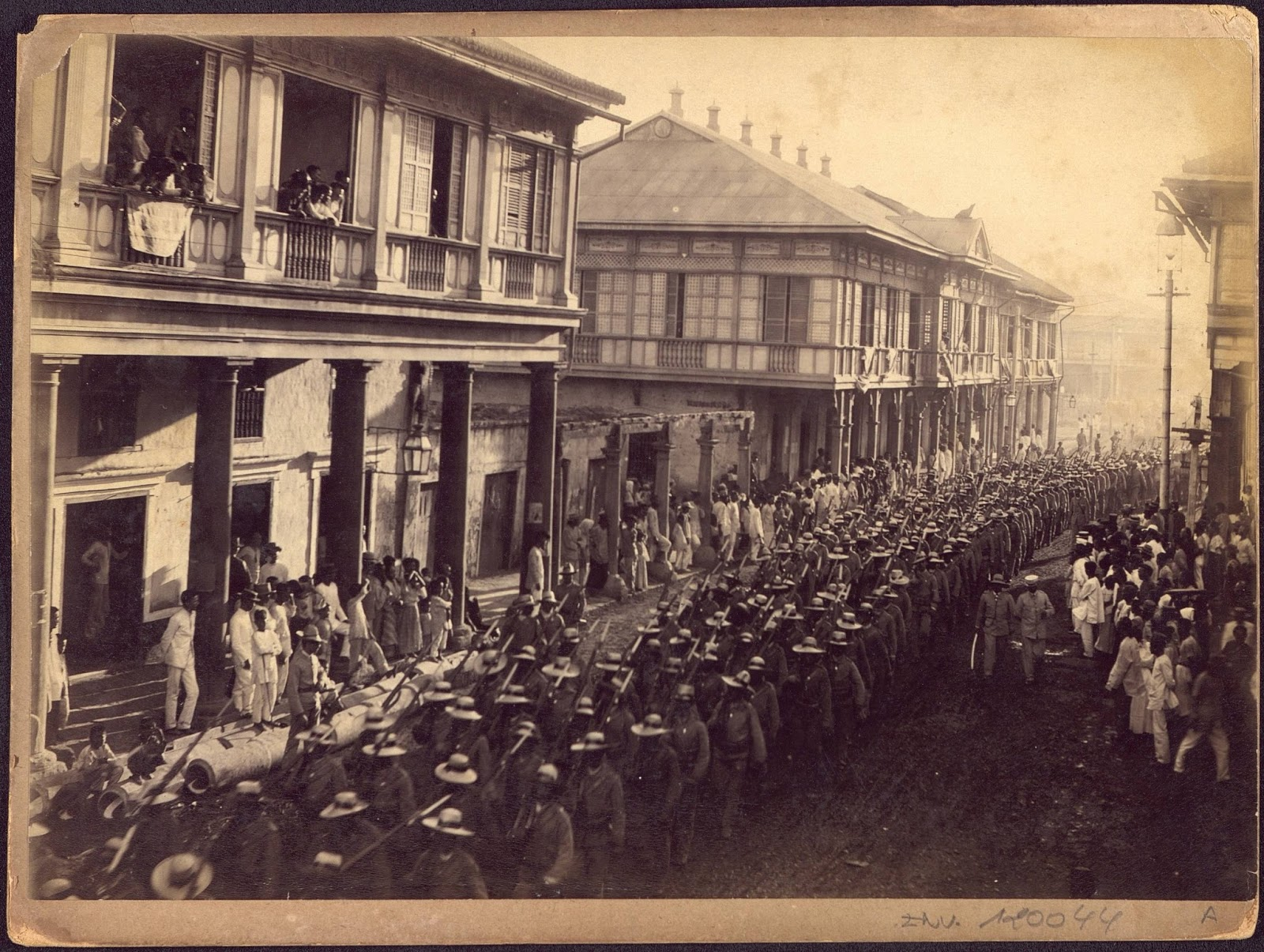
Mansions in a colonnaded street Calle San Sebastian, Quiapo, Manila late 1800s.

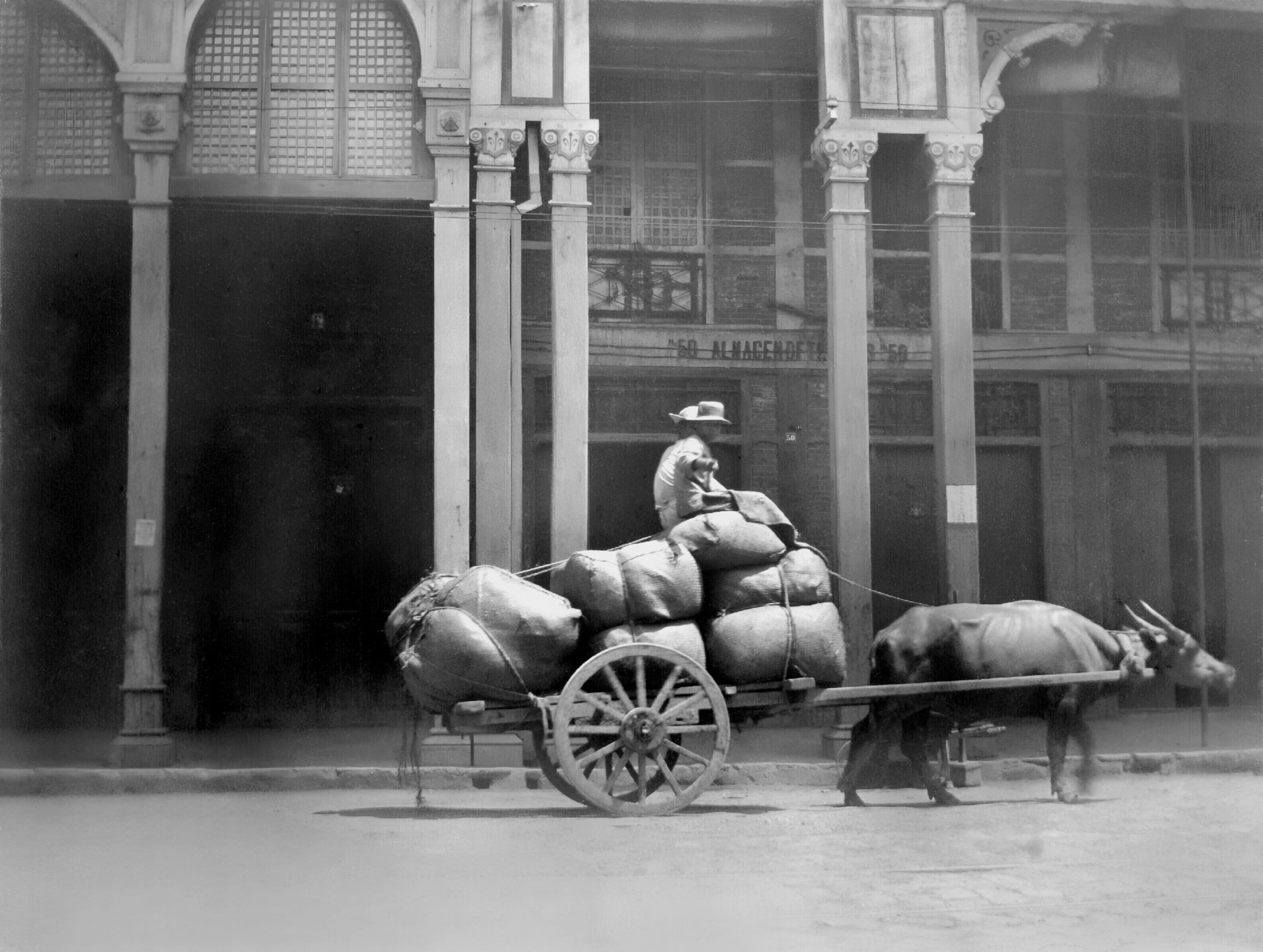
Binondo, Manila

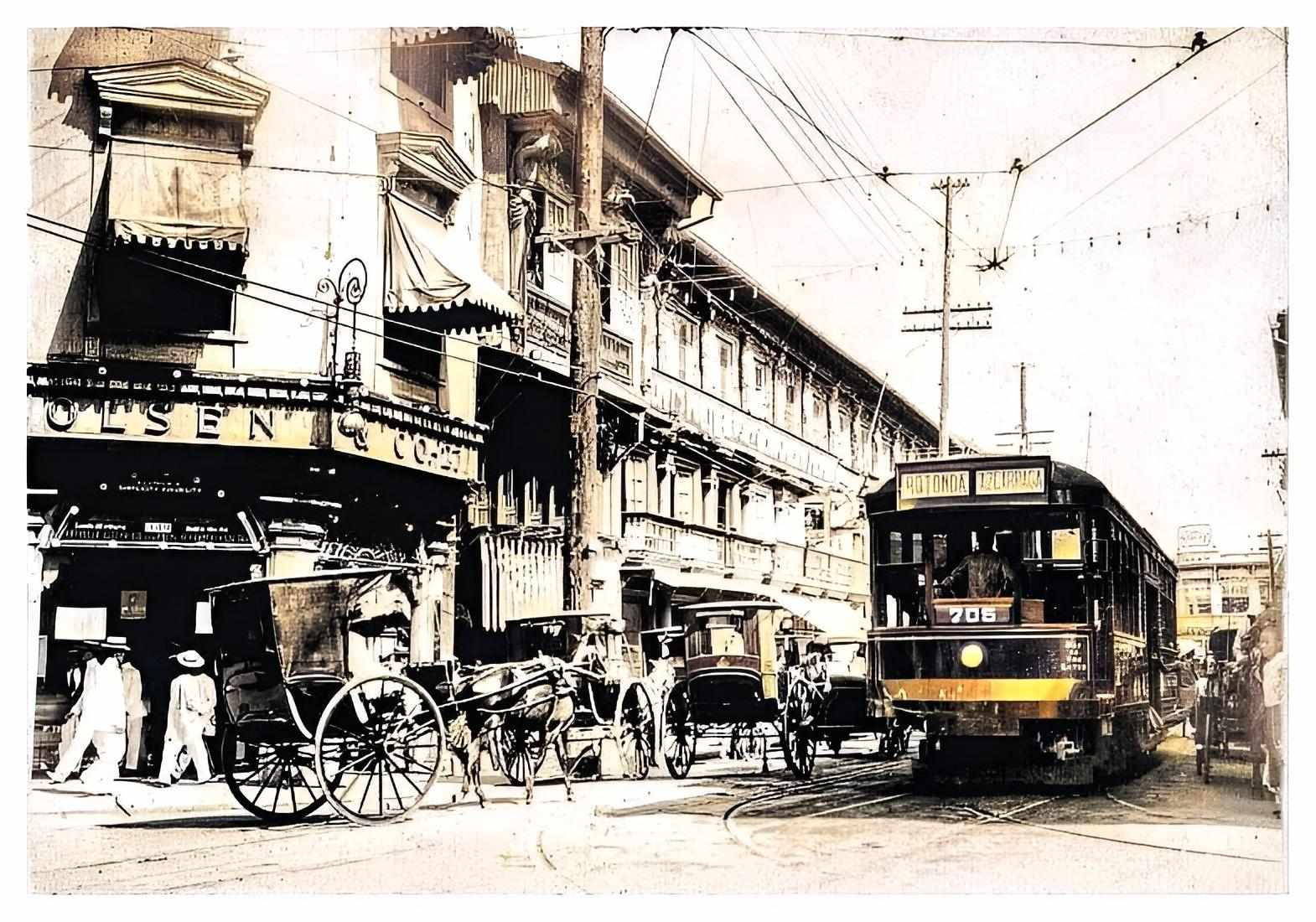
Edificio Tuason on Calle Escolta, Manila with rich ornamentation of Ionic columns Atlases and Caryatids.

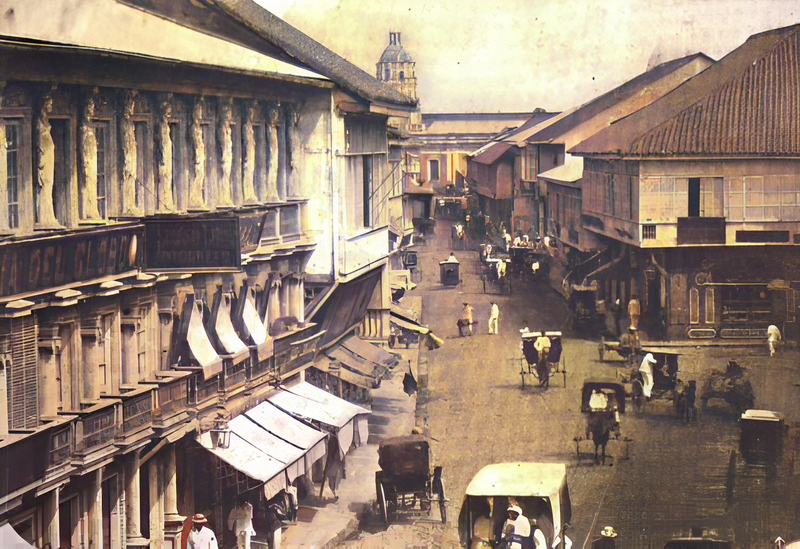
Edificio Tuason, Calle Escolta.

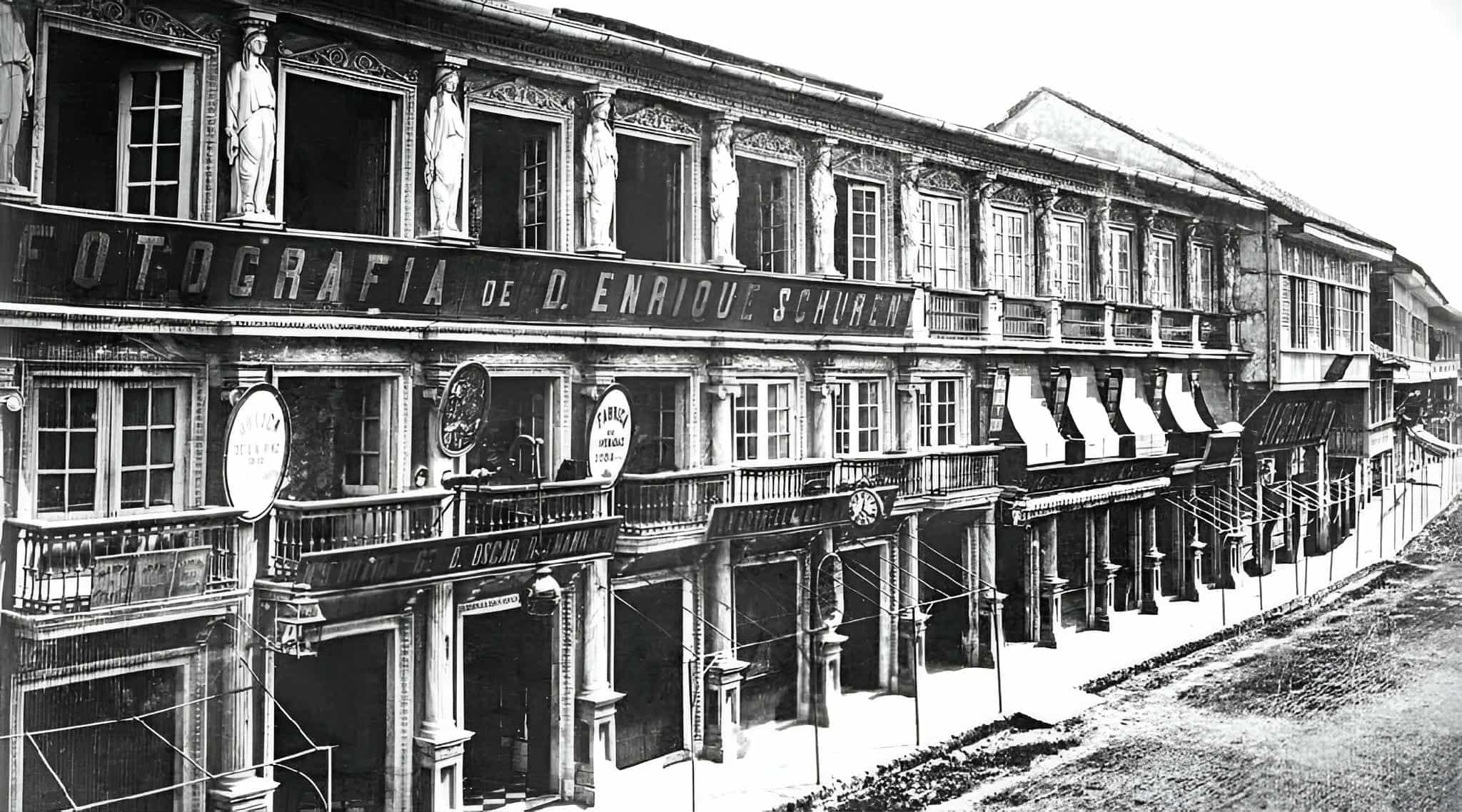
Edificio Tuason.

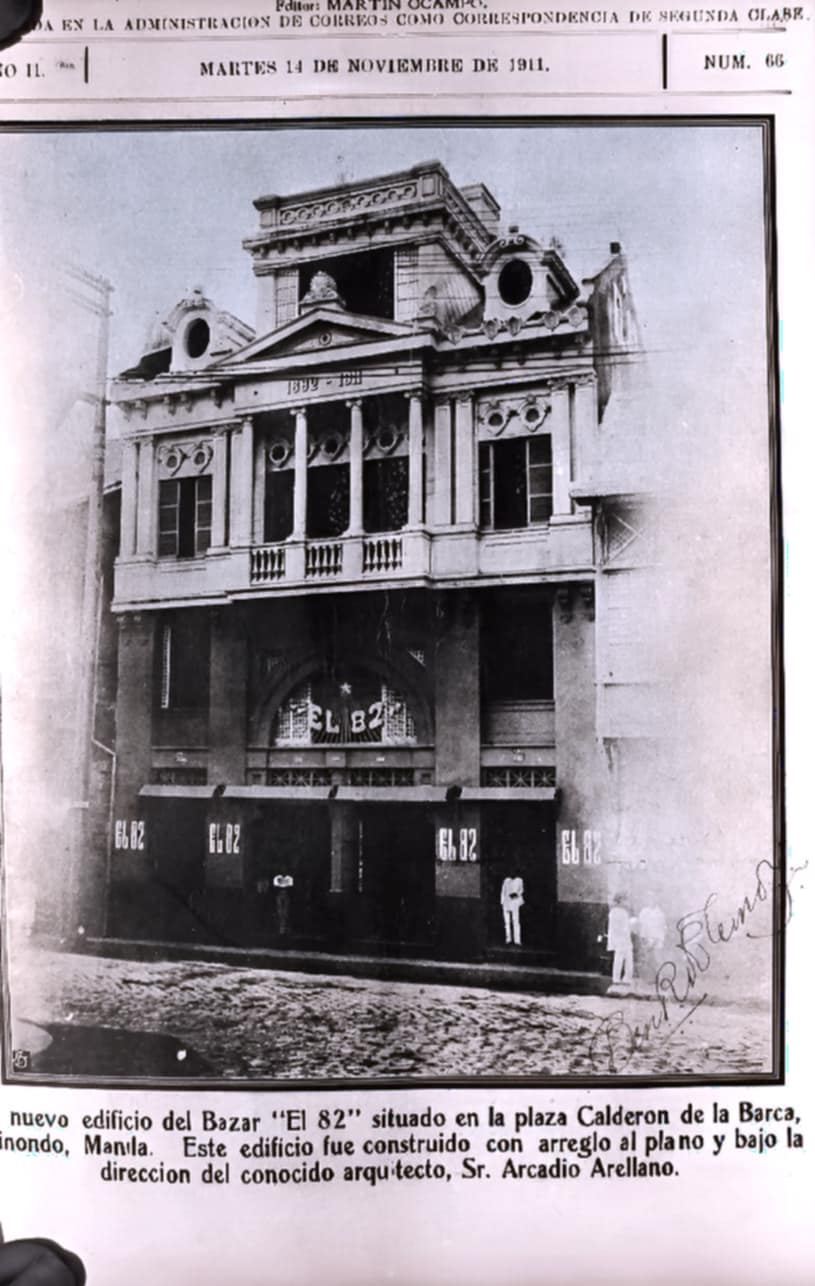
Bazar El 82 building Plaza Calderon, Manila.

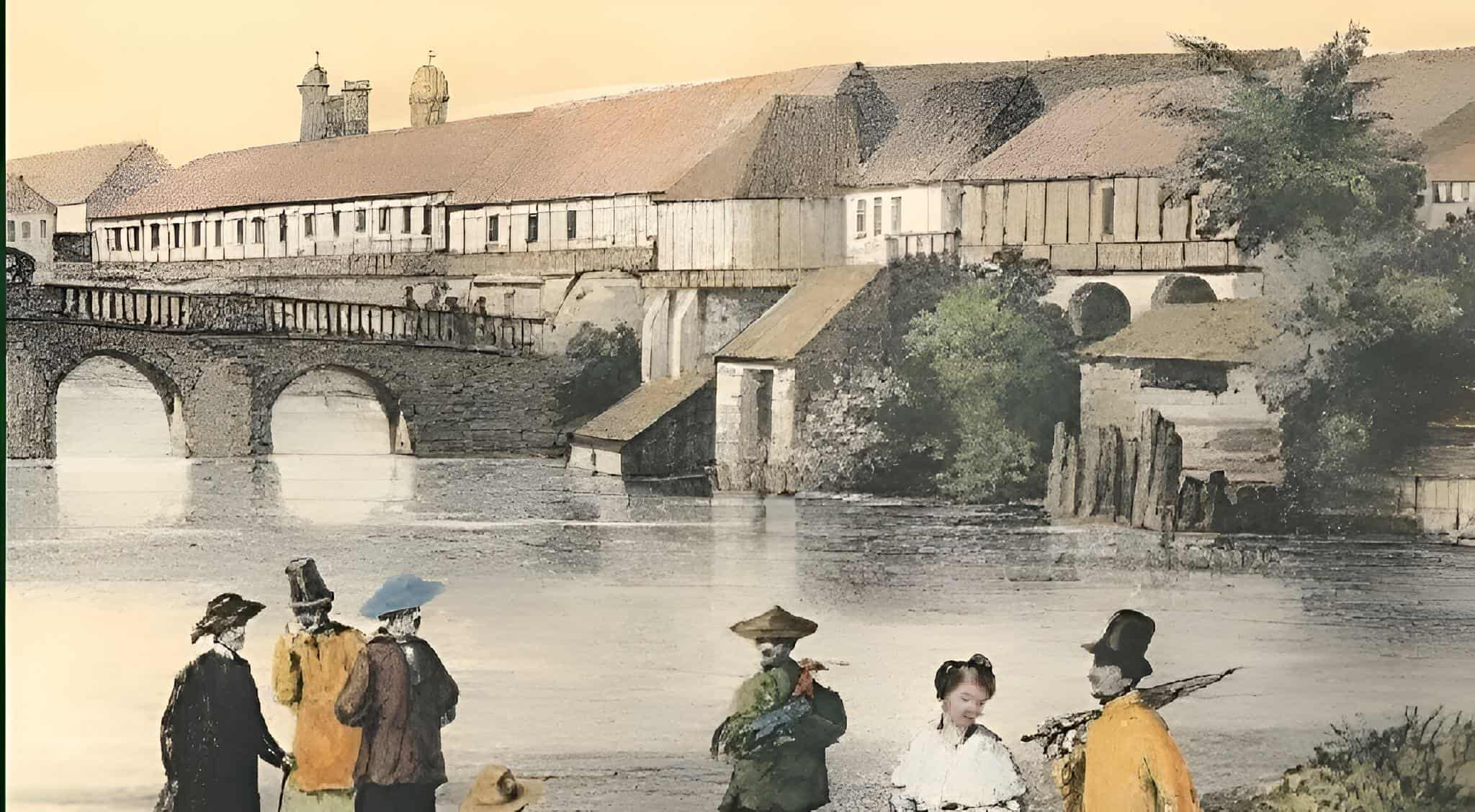
Mansions besides Pasig River

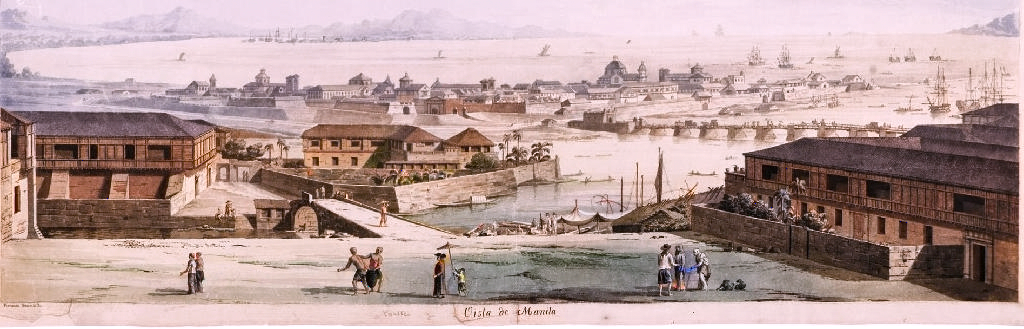
View of Manila .

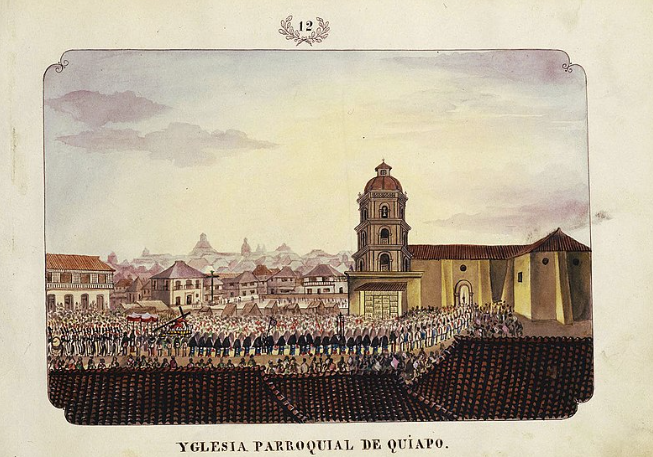
Old view of Quiapo and its mansions.

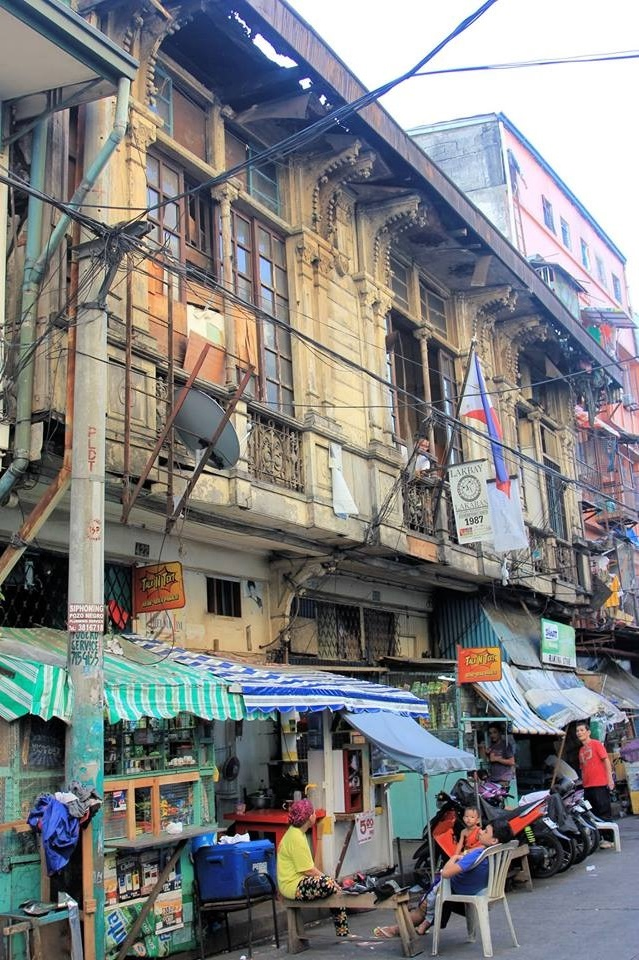
Boix House

==== Northern Luzon ====
Northern Luzon has some of the best preserved bahay na bato in the Philippines. The unique style of the north, commonly in the Ilocos Region, usually bases its design on brick materials. This material is commonly used in bahay na bato buildings, houses, churches, walls, monuments and fortification of the region.

Brick was the essential building material in northern Luzon; houses and churches of brick were also built in scattered areas of the archipelago. Unique designs of the north may include having the façade walls of the second level made up of plastered bricks, embedded with a wooden frame. Although the wooden second level façade in bahay na bato are also present in the north.

In Vigan, the capital of Ilocos Sur, many homeowners built both stories in brick, which was available in large quantities. With the massive walls, the volada (an overhanging balcony) disappeared in many residences, and the kitchen became an extension in stone, with vents piercing the walls to let out smoke.

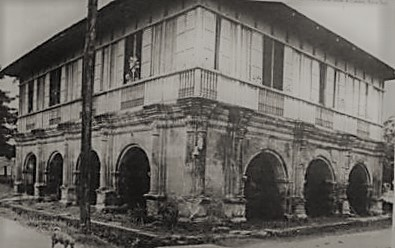
Cariño ancestral house, Candon

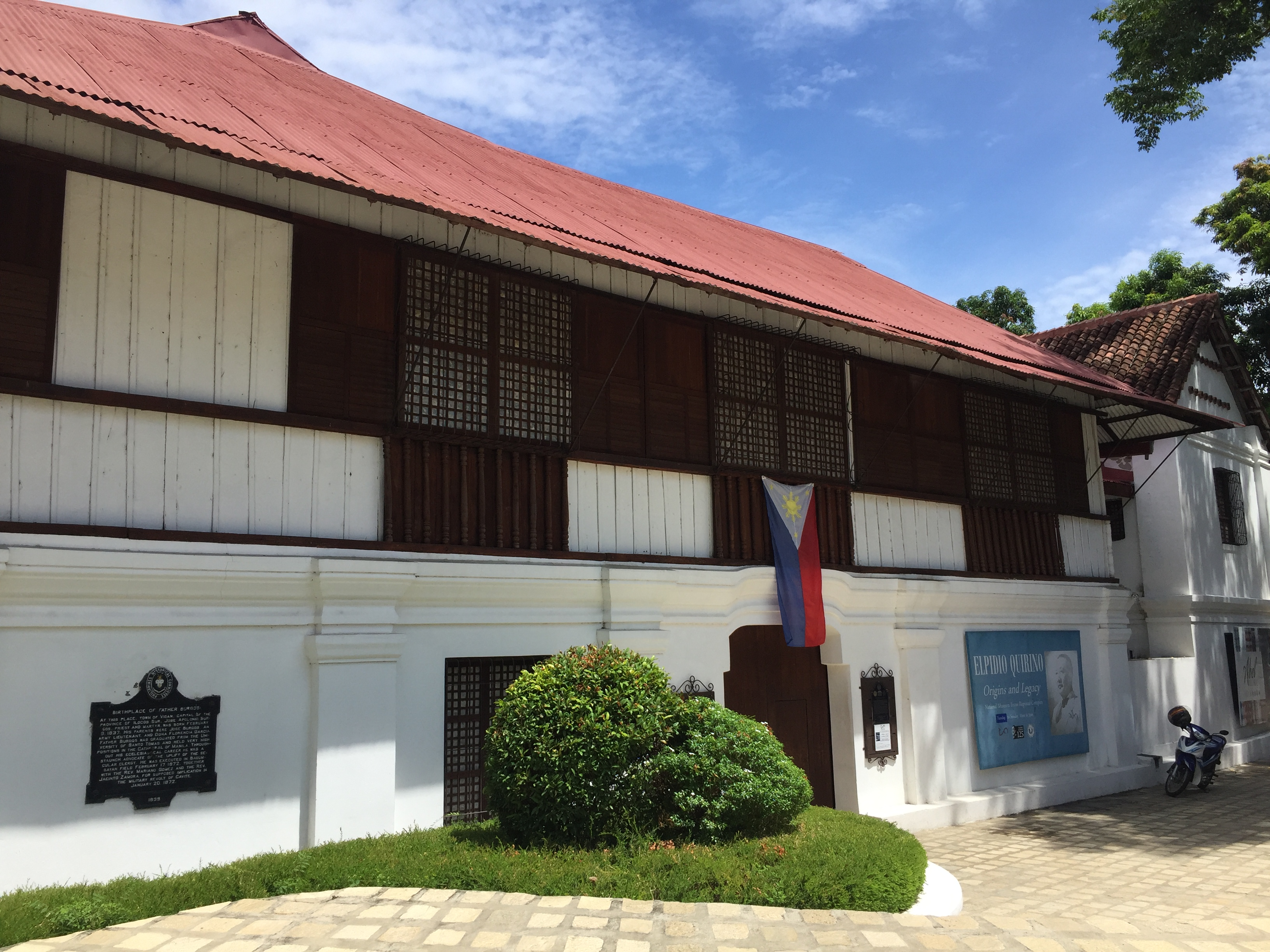
Padre Burgos ancestral house, Vigan

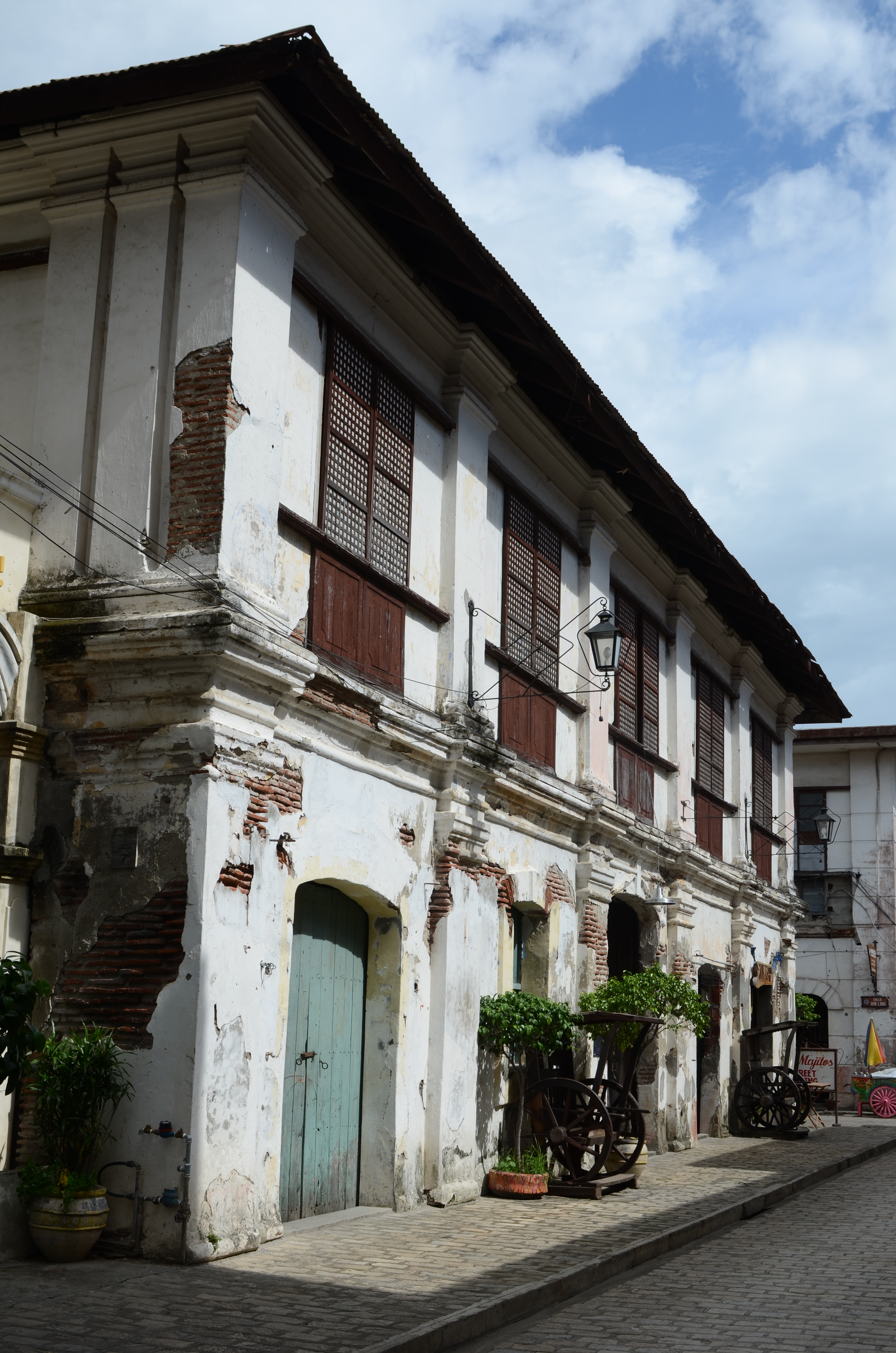
Vigan house

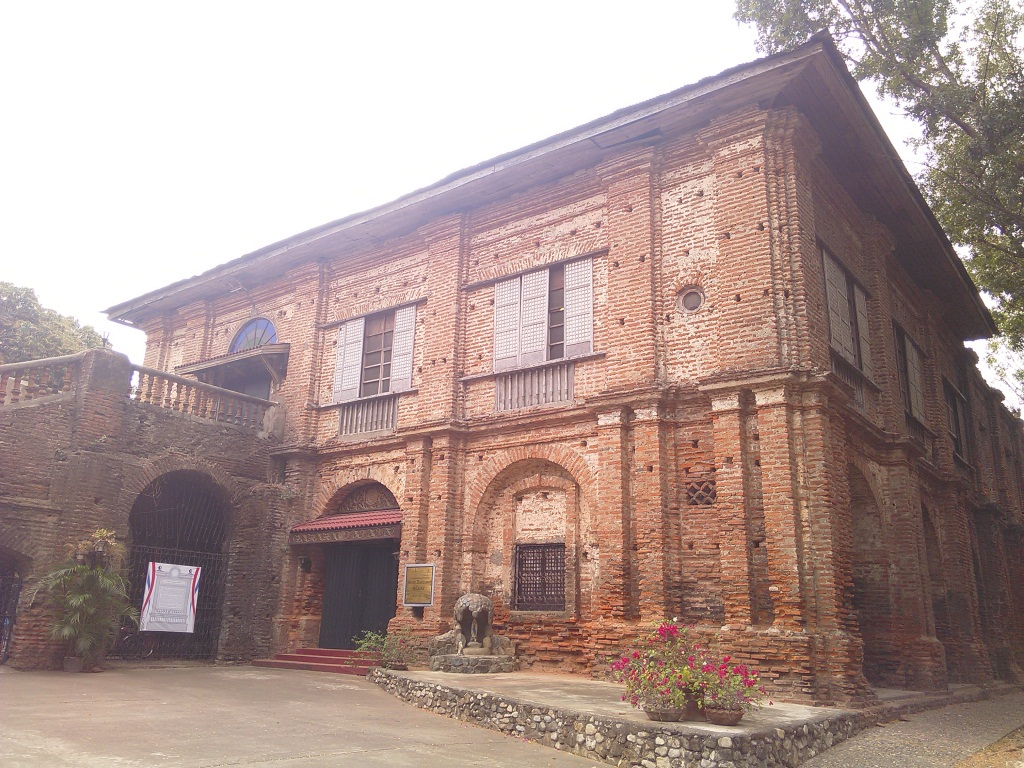
The Northern Luzon variant's most common feature is brick up to the second floor facade, in contrast with the common wooden second floor facade in other provinces. This particular building is the convent of Sarrat Church in Ilocos Norte

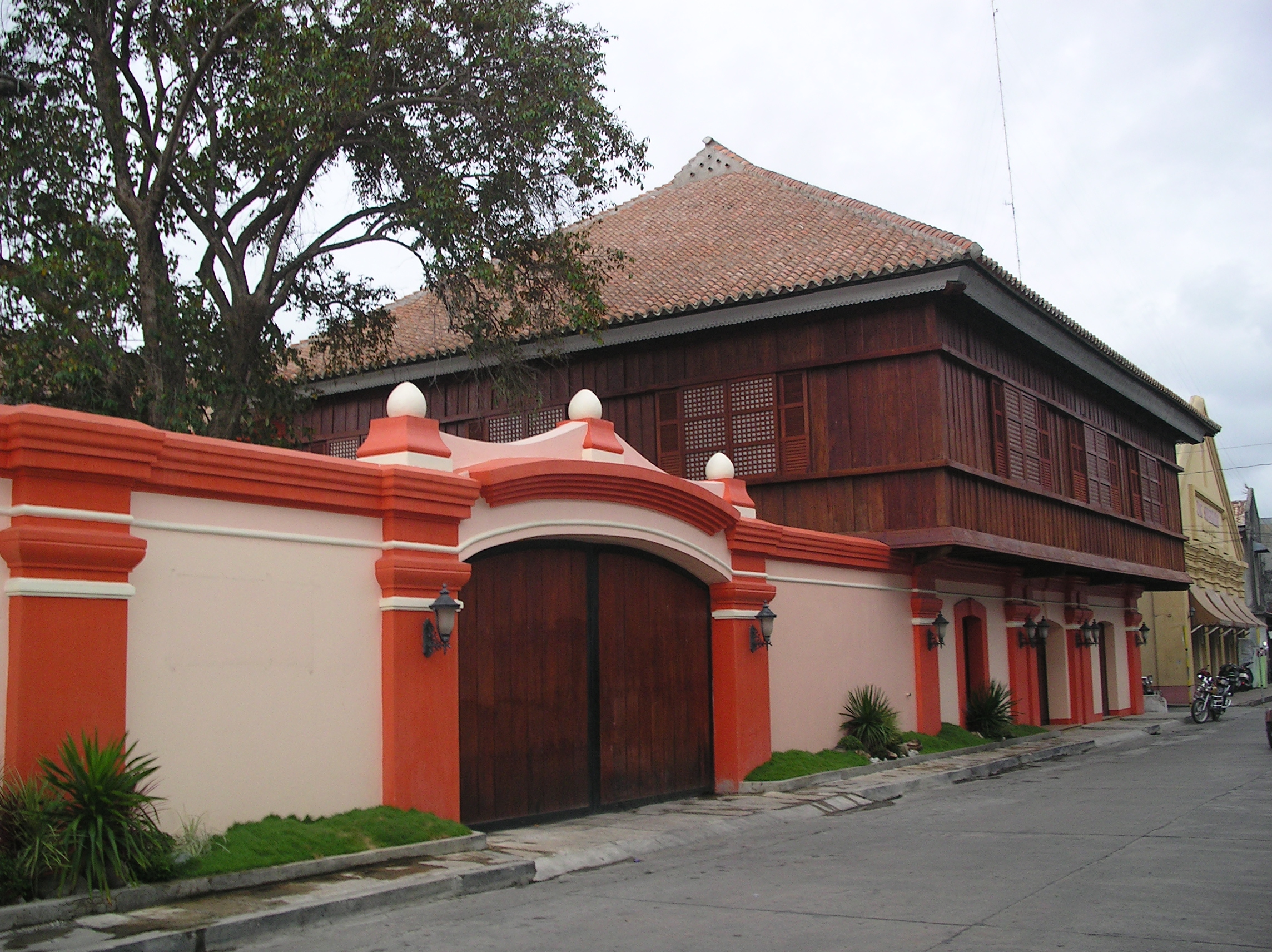
A colonial-era house in Vigan, Ilocos Sur

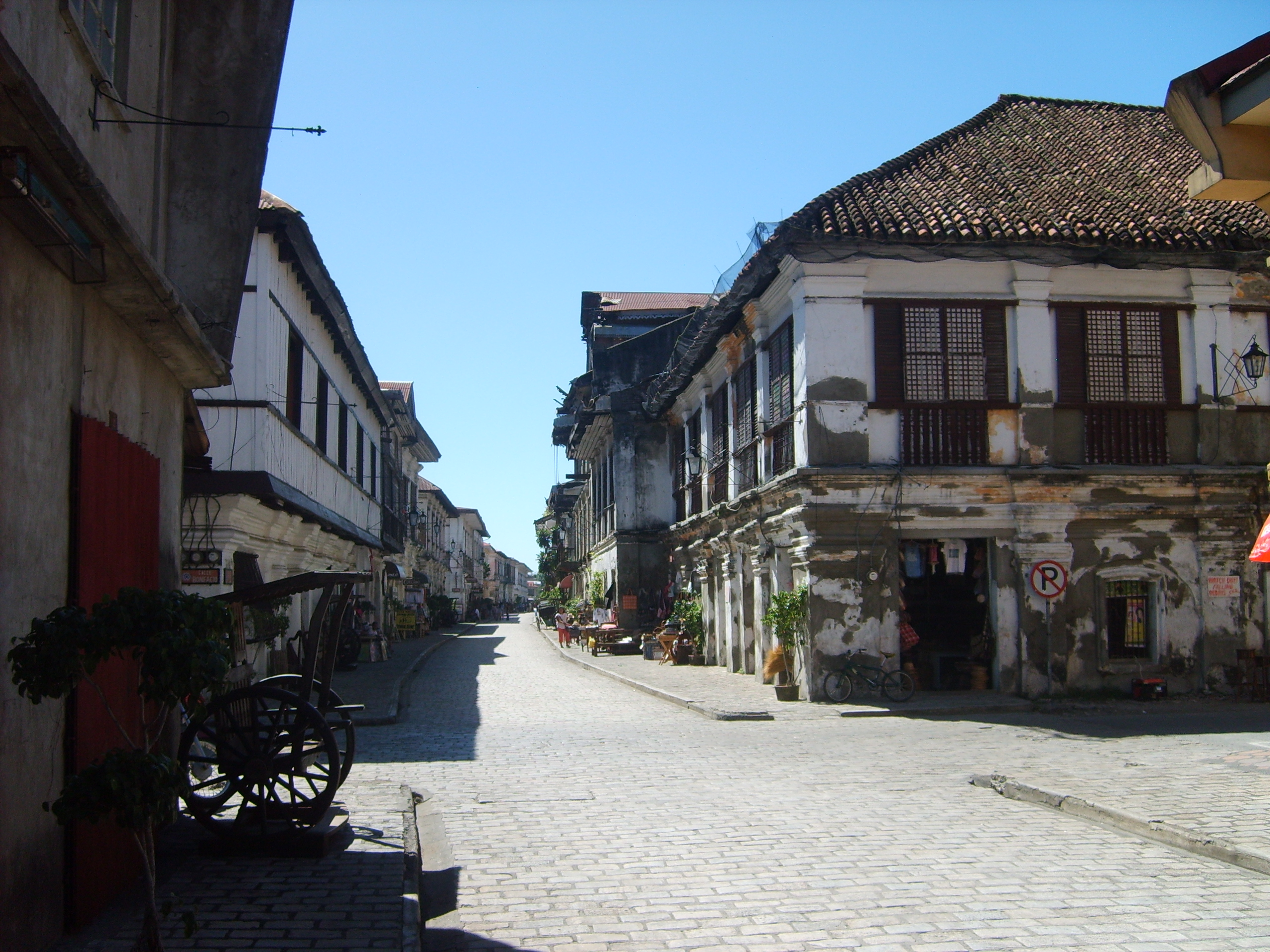
Calle Crisologo, Vigan

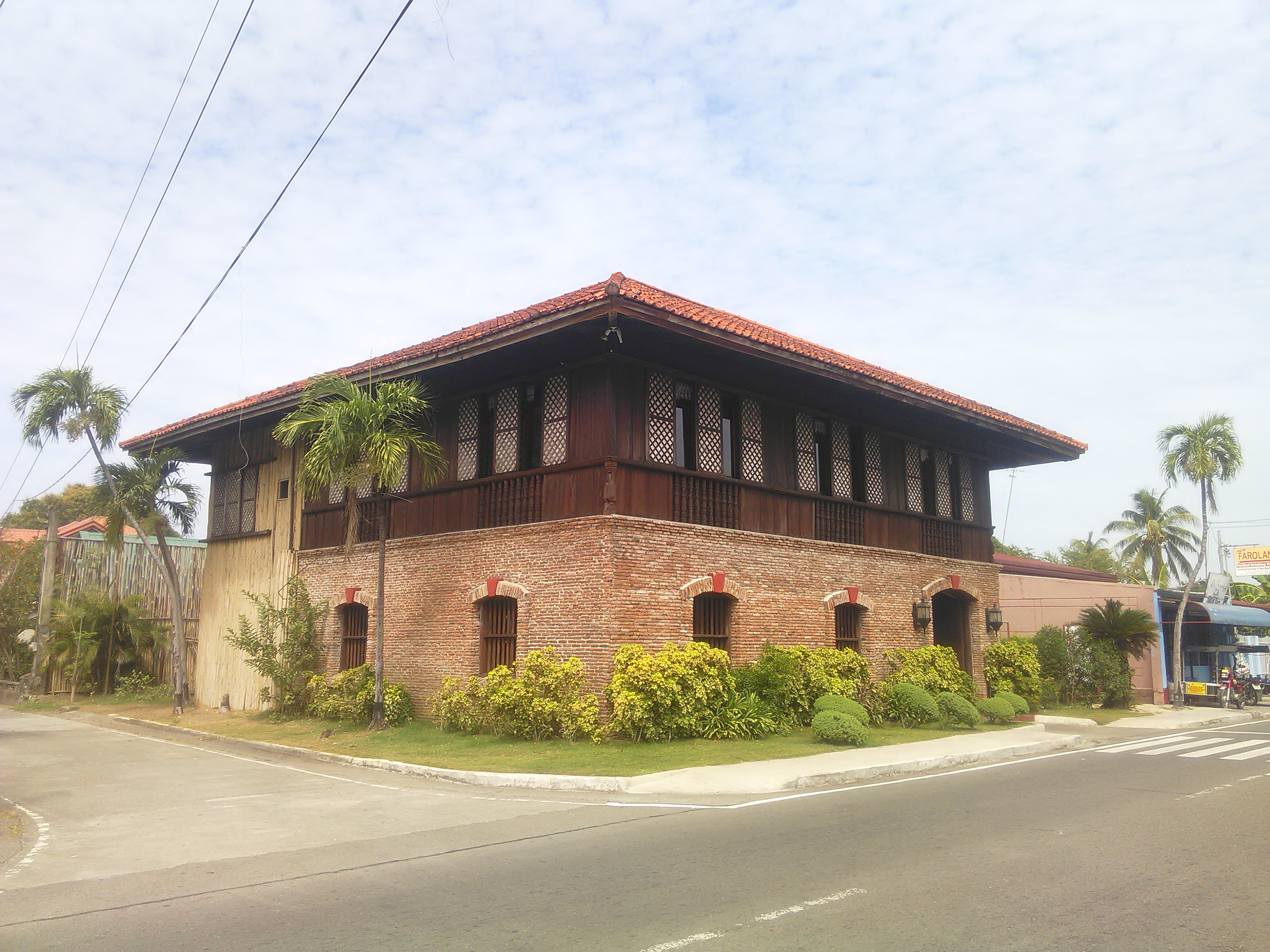
Edralin House, Sarrat, Ilocos Norte

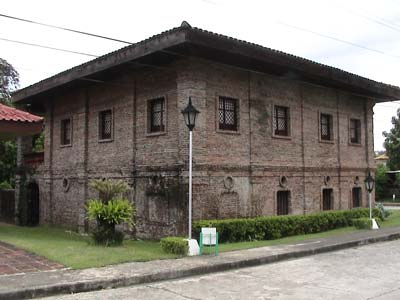
Luna House, Badoc, Ilocos Norte

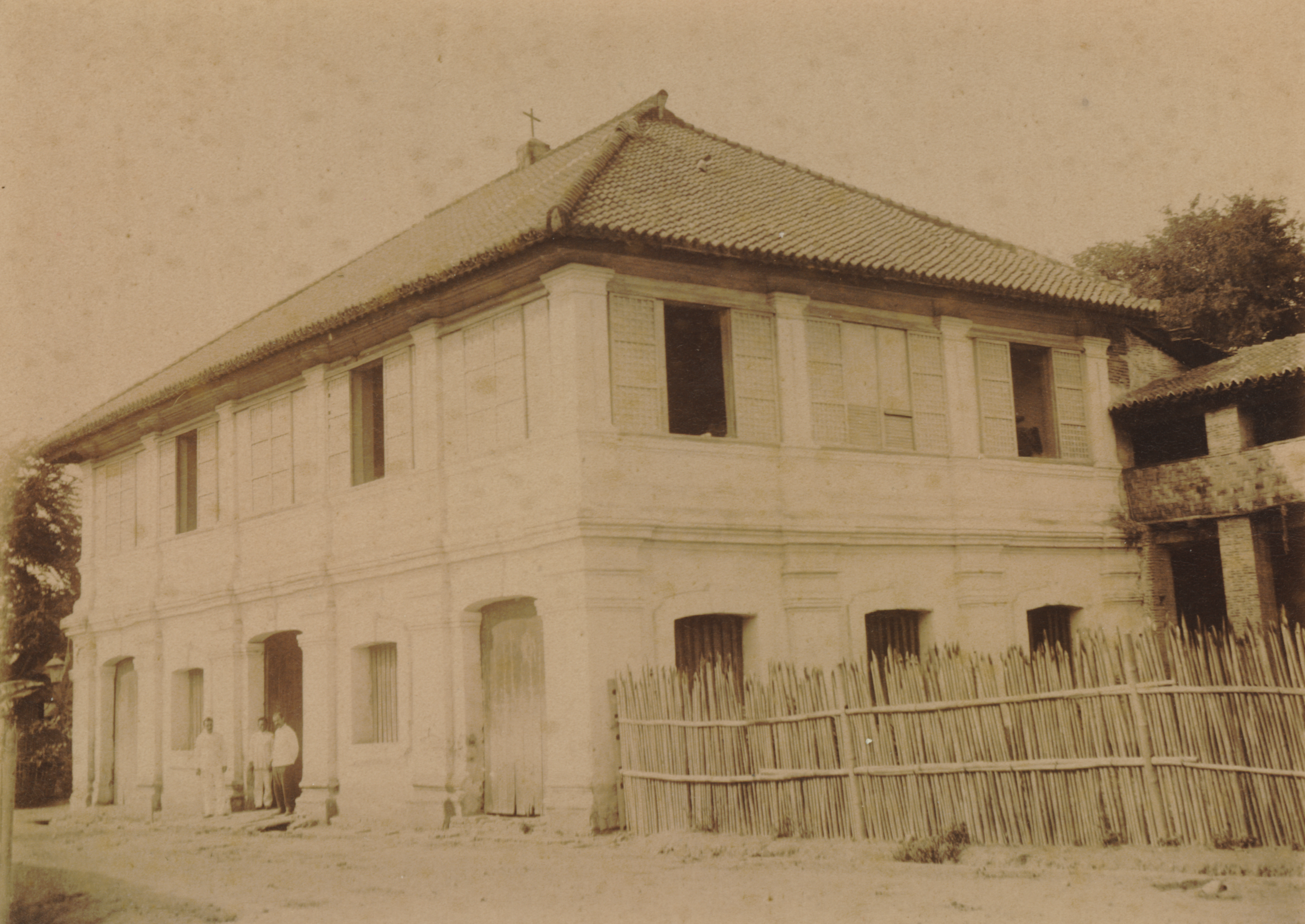
Old house, Vigan

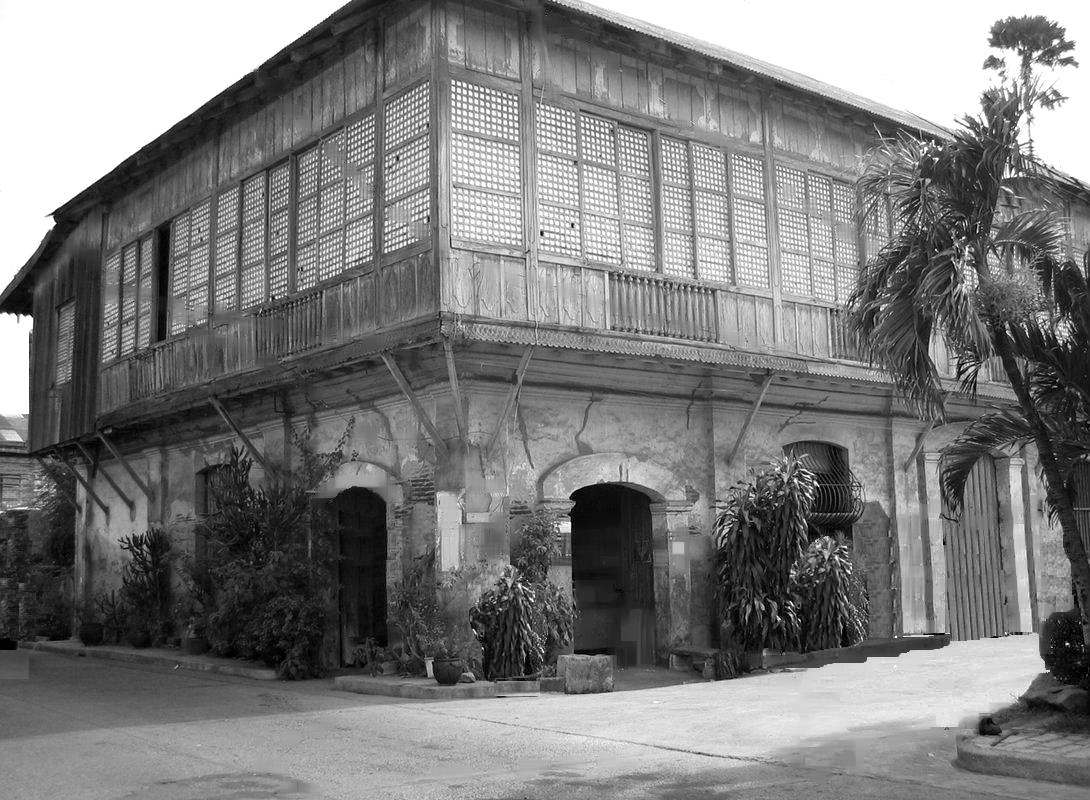
Quema ancestral house

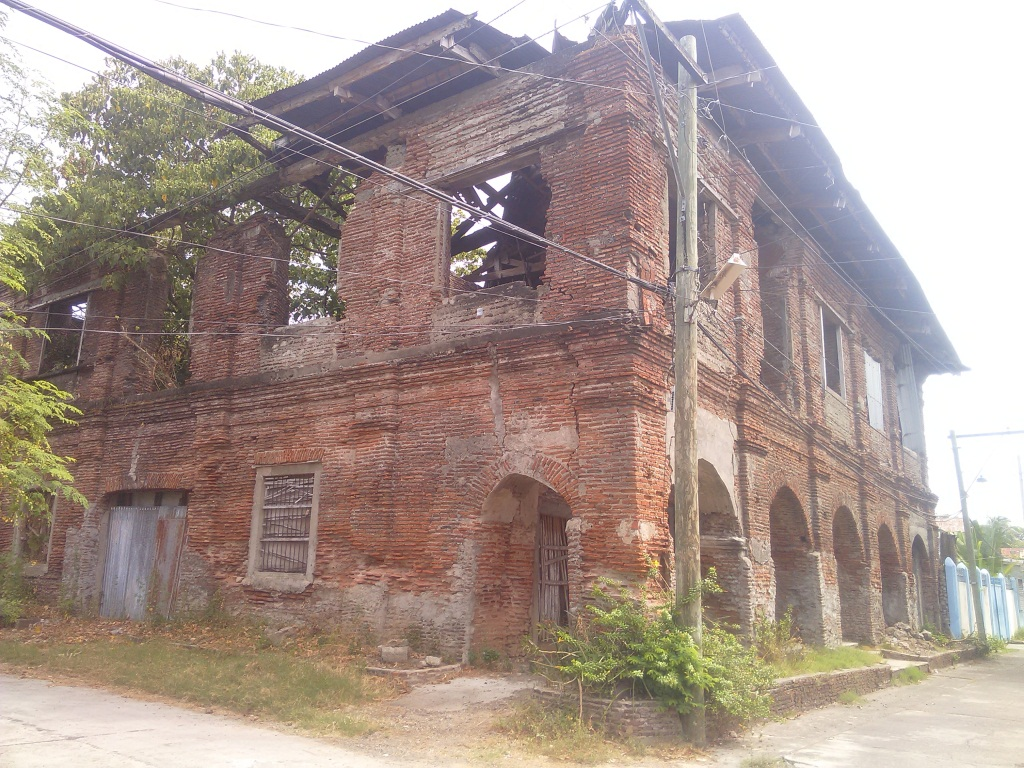
Abogada Corazon Abad House Ruins, Ilocos

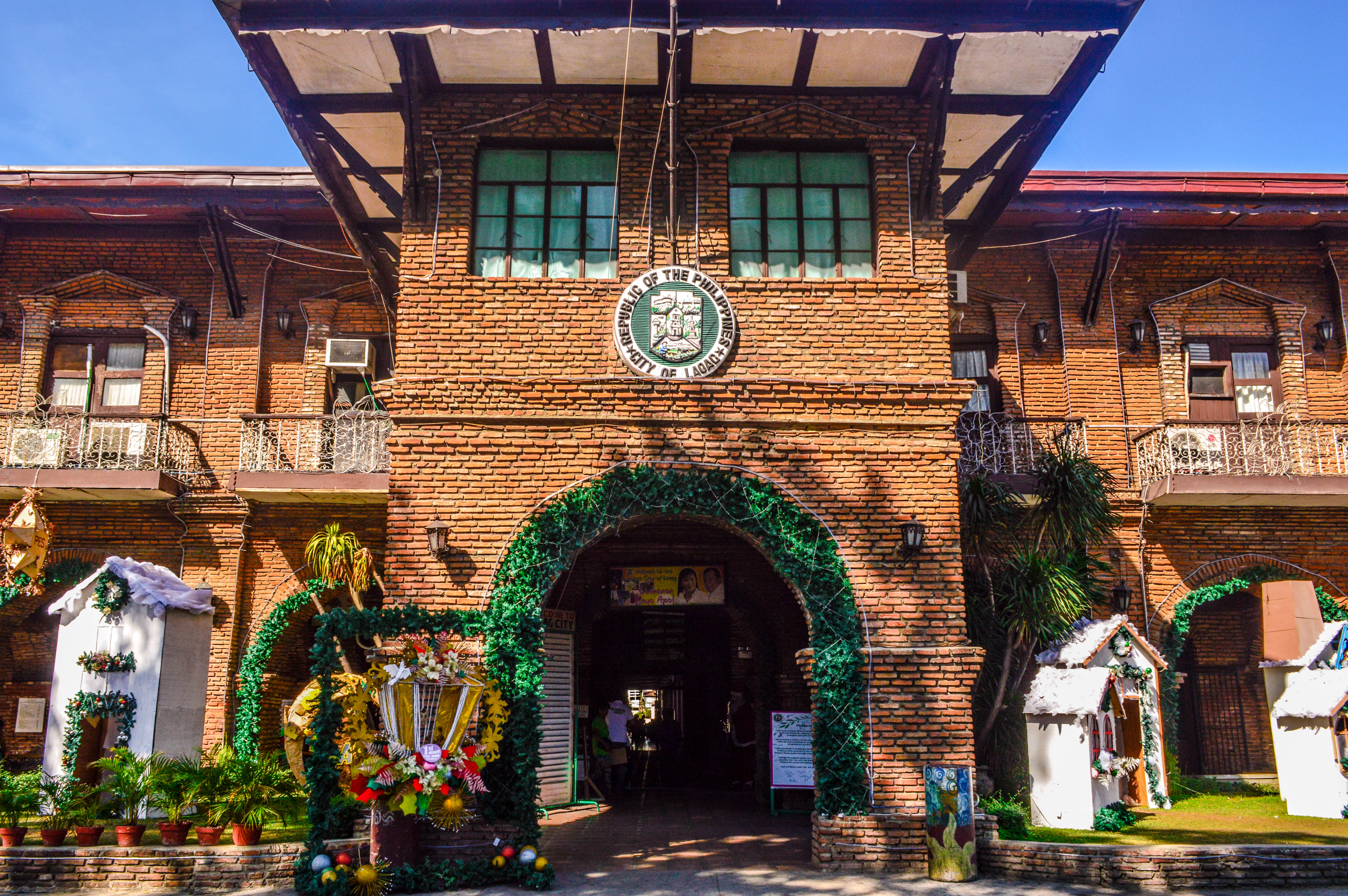
Laoag City Hall

==== Southern Tagalog ====
Southern Tagalog, especially Calabarzon has some of the most thoroughly preserved heritage houses, built mostly using adobe stones. Towns along the coasts of Luzon, especially in Batangas, used roughly hewn blocks of coral and adobe stone.

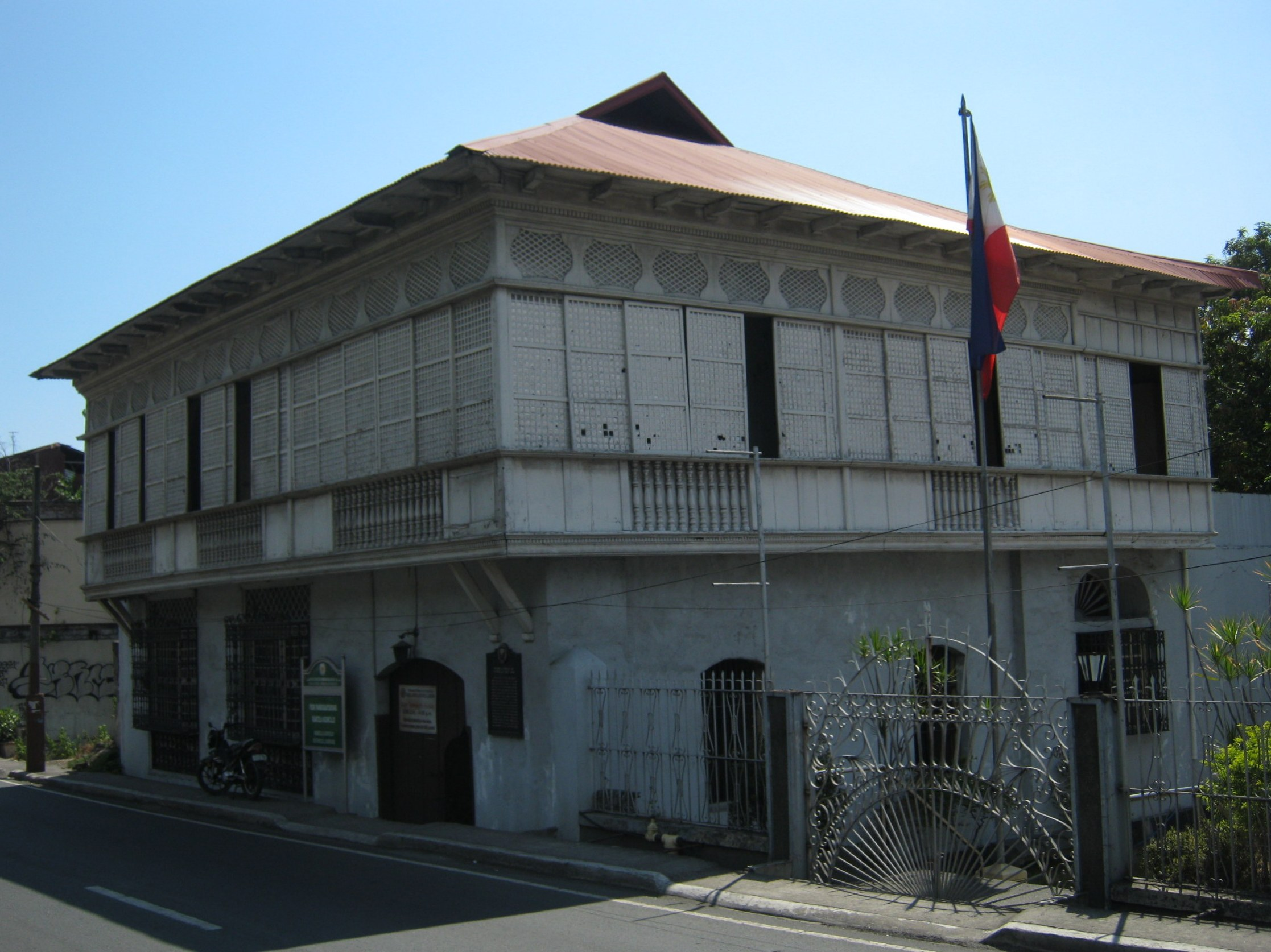
Marcela Agoncillo house

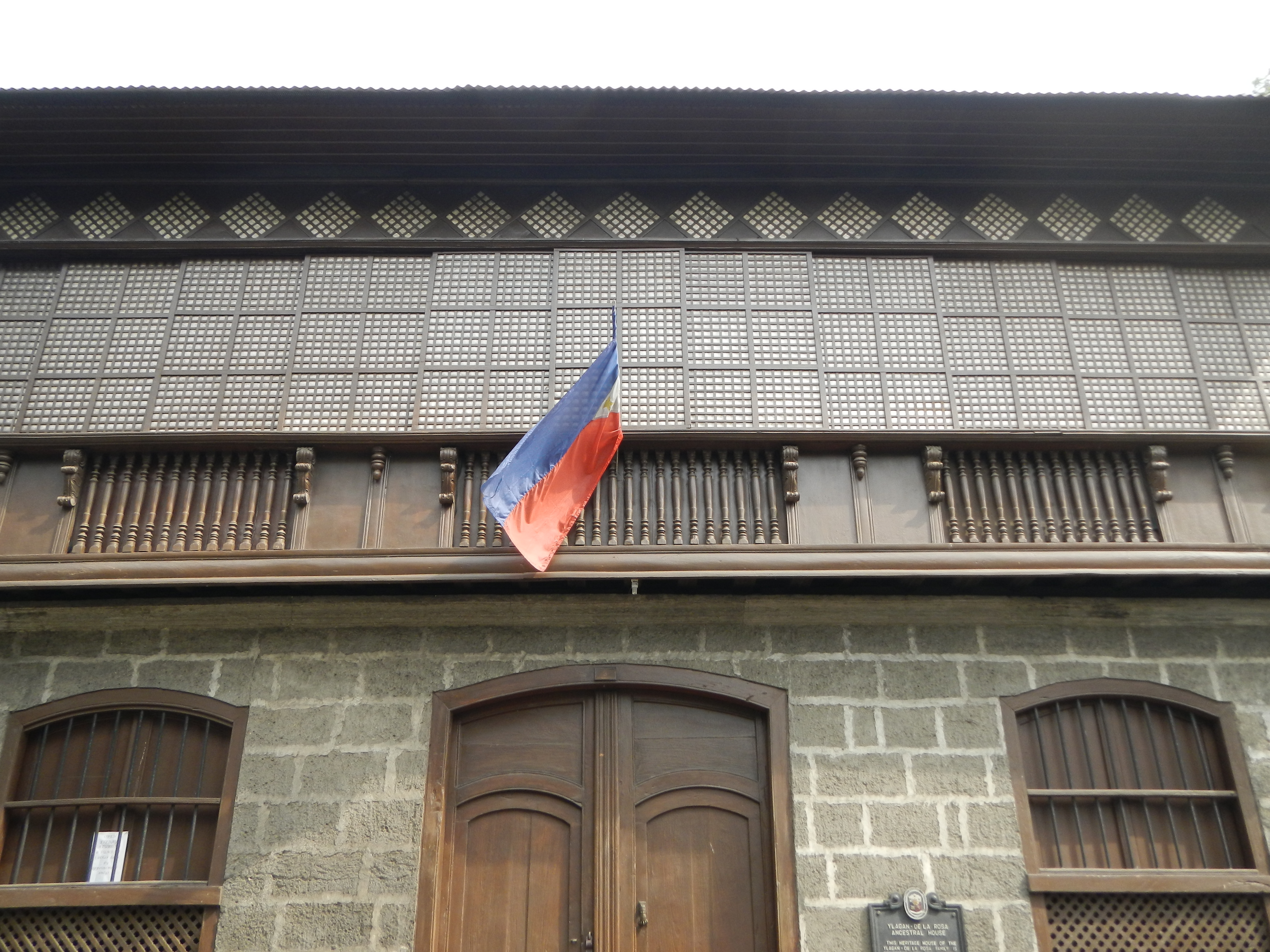
Old house in Taal, Batangas; note the two smaller postigos inset in the large main door (puerto)

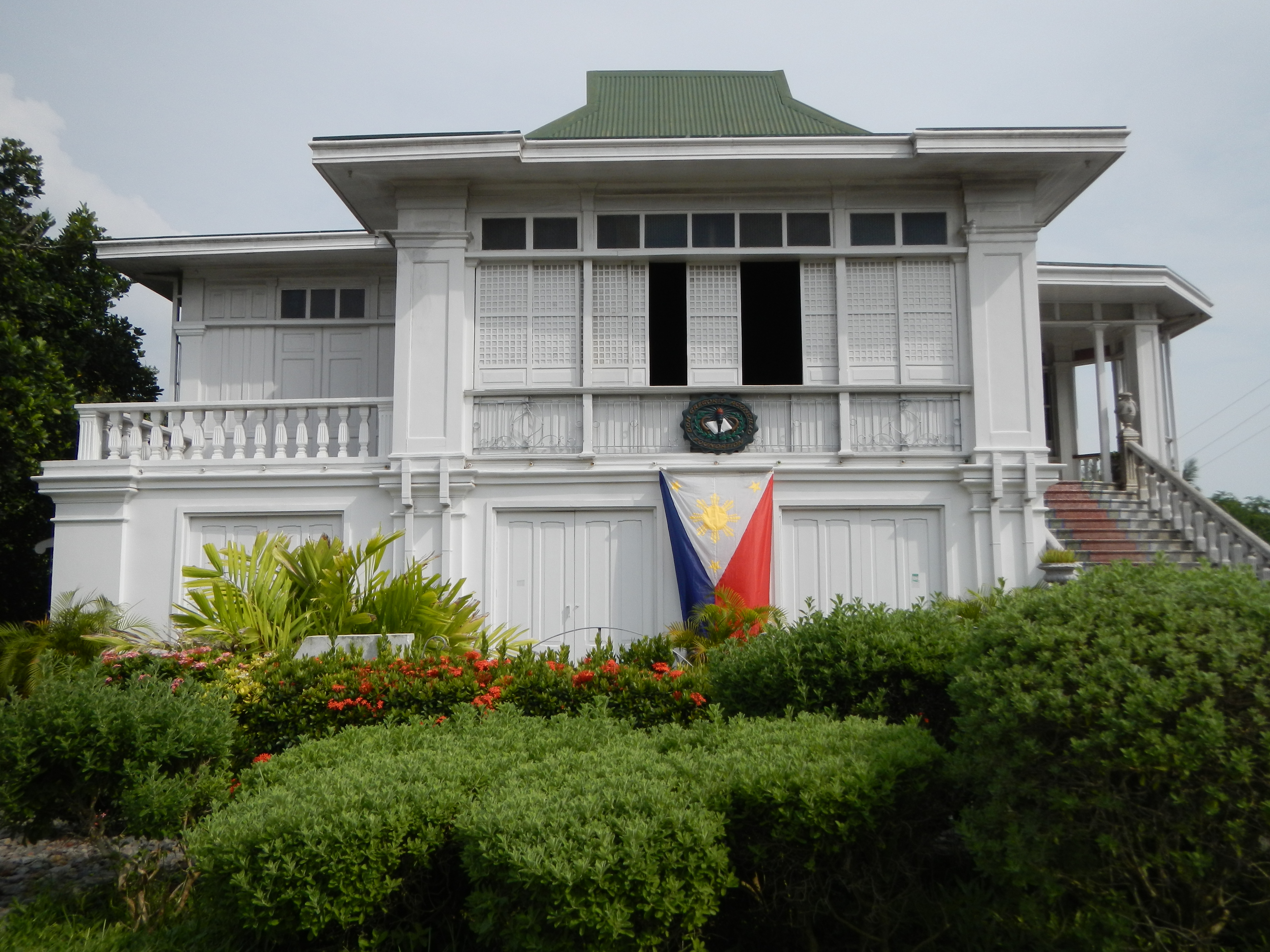
Felipe Agoncillo house

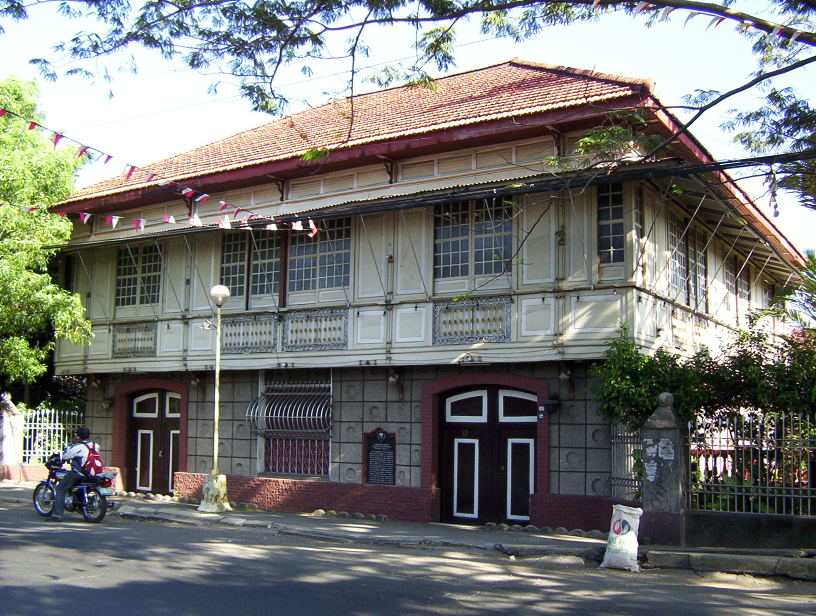
Cuenca Ancestral House

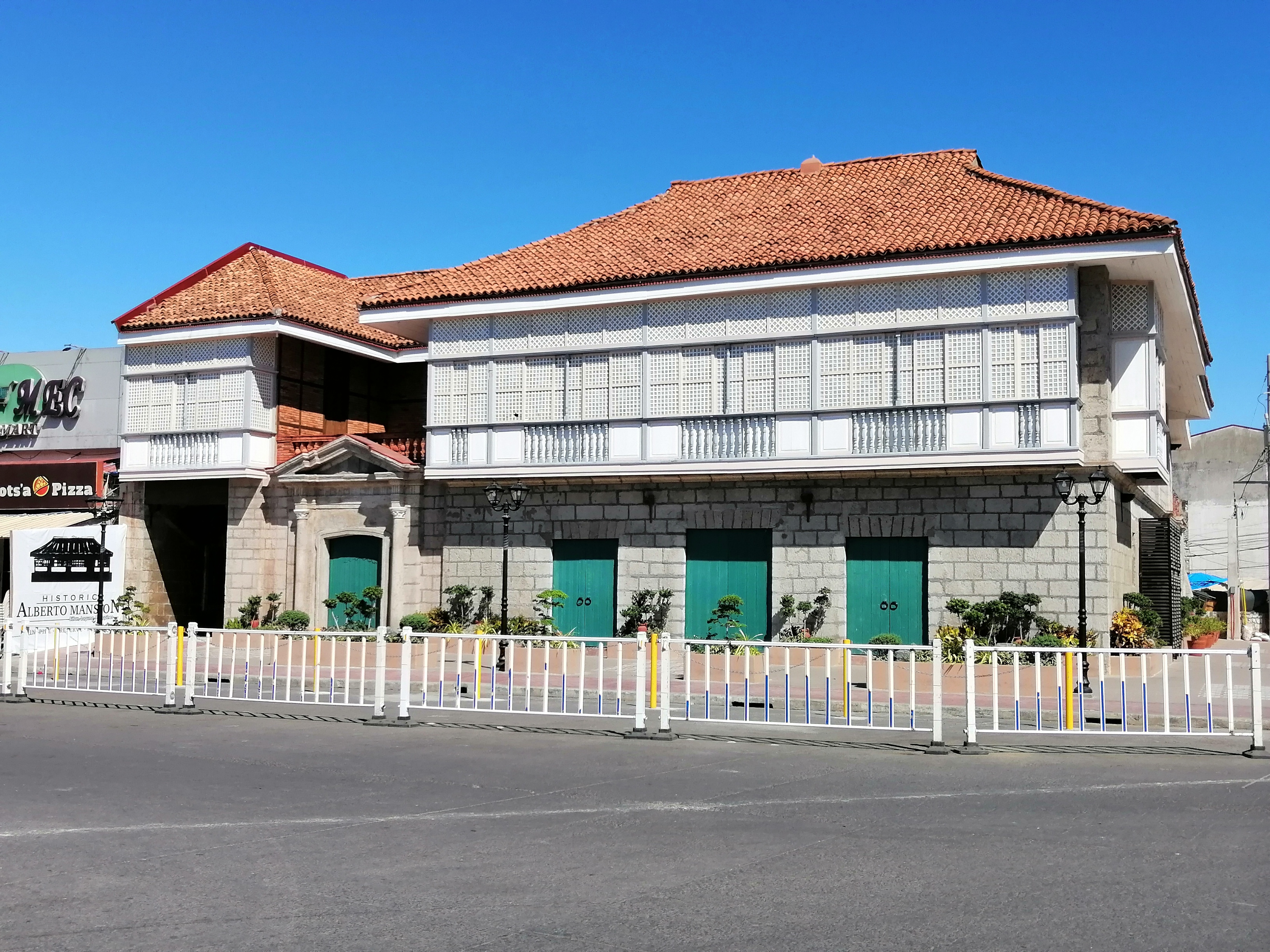
Alberto Mansion, Biñan

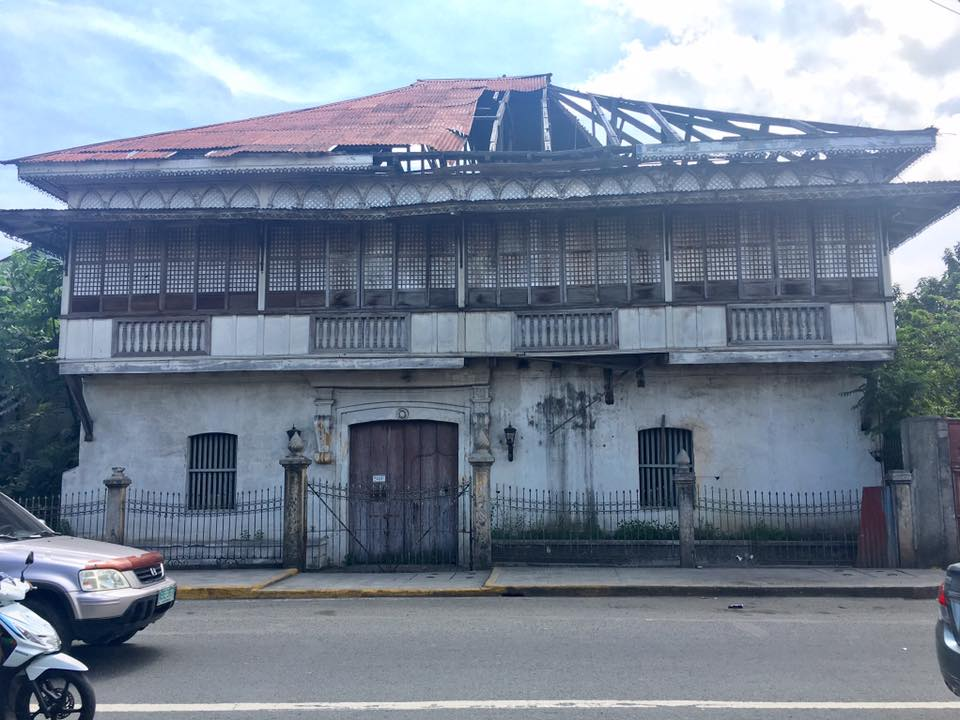
House in Calamba. Falling into abandonment, like many of Bahay na bato structures.

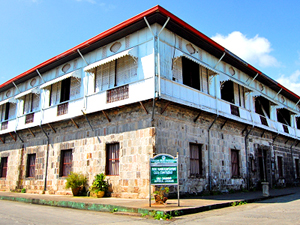
Casa Comunidad de Tayabas

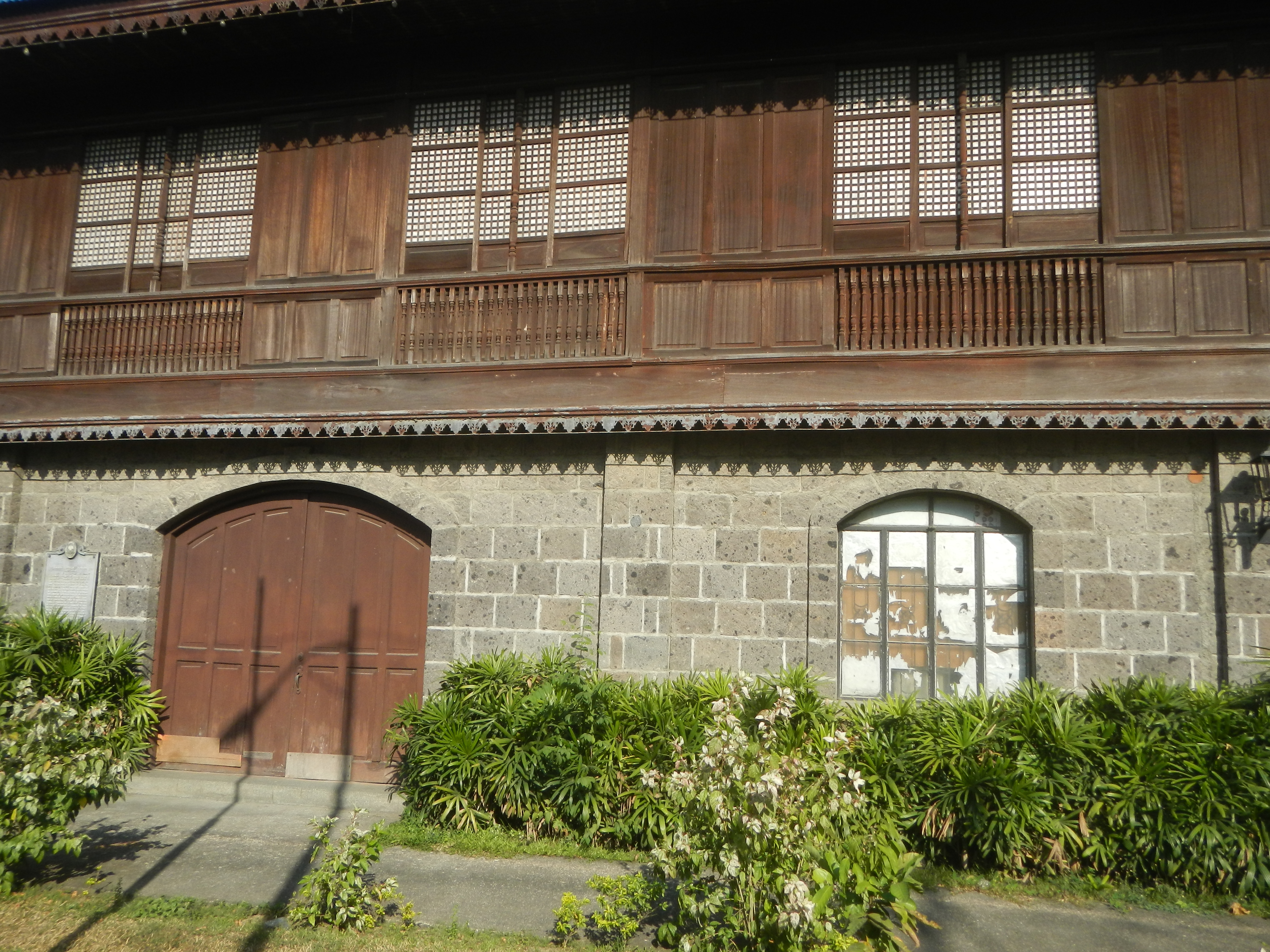
Eulogio Rodriguez ancestral house,Rodriguez, Rizal

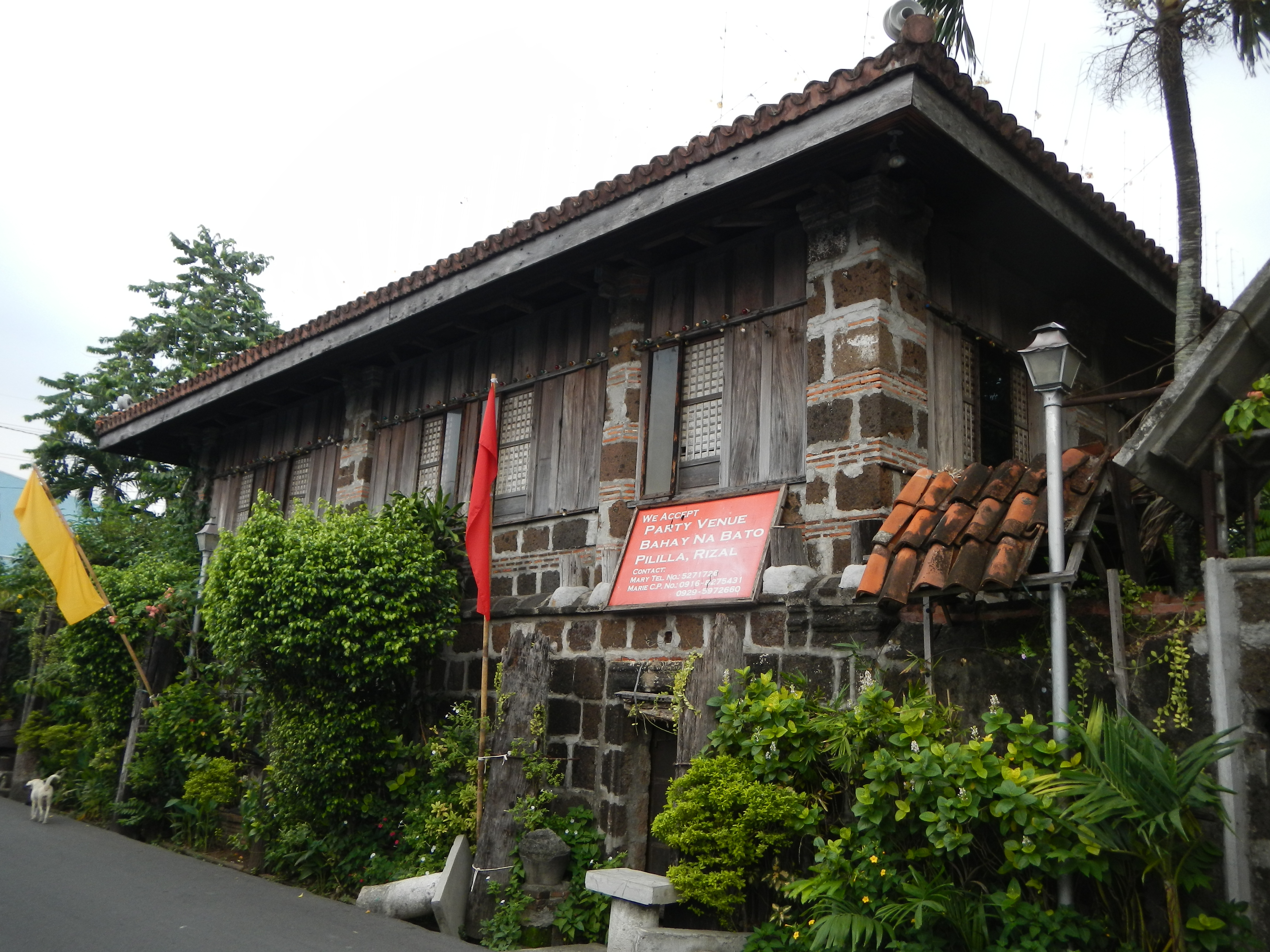
House in Pililla, Rizal

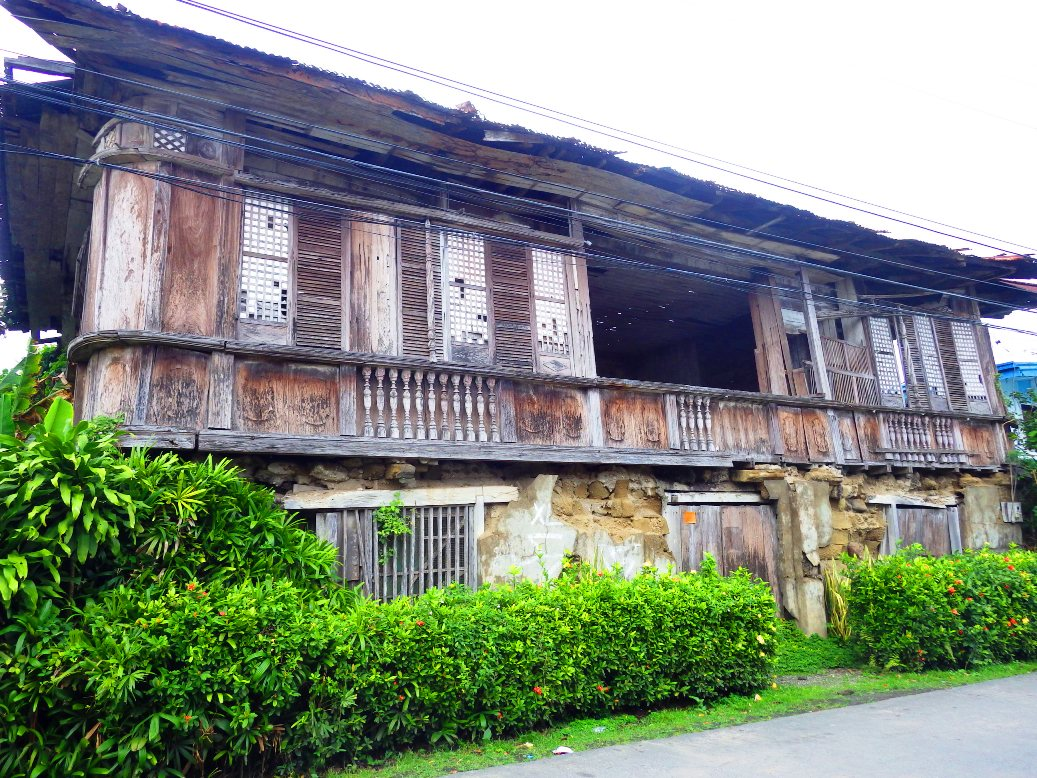
Maraña Ancestral House,Naujan

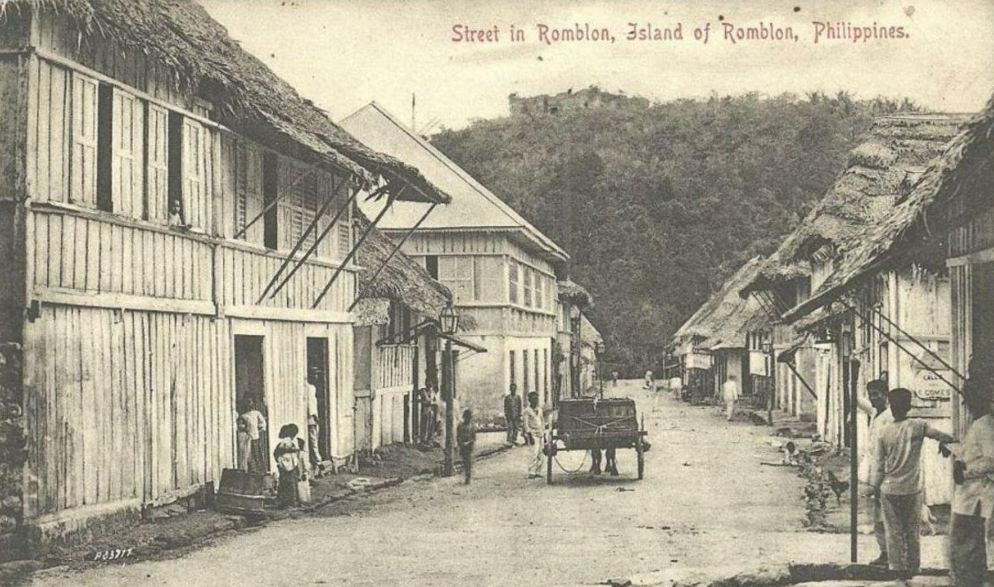
Street of Romblon in 1905, with some Bahay na bato structures.

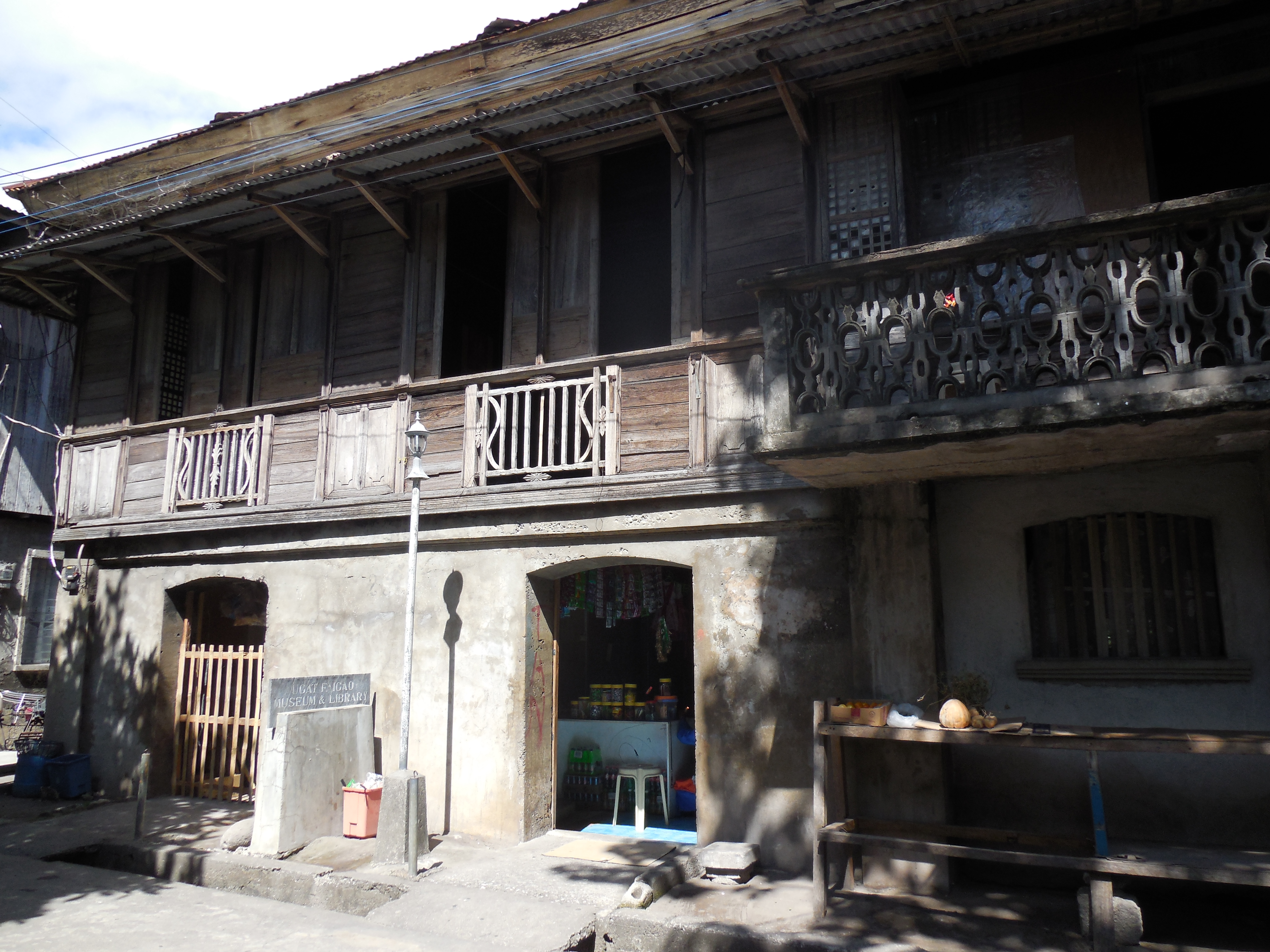
Faigao ancestral house, Romblon

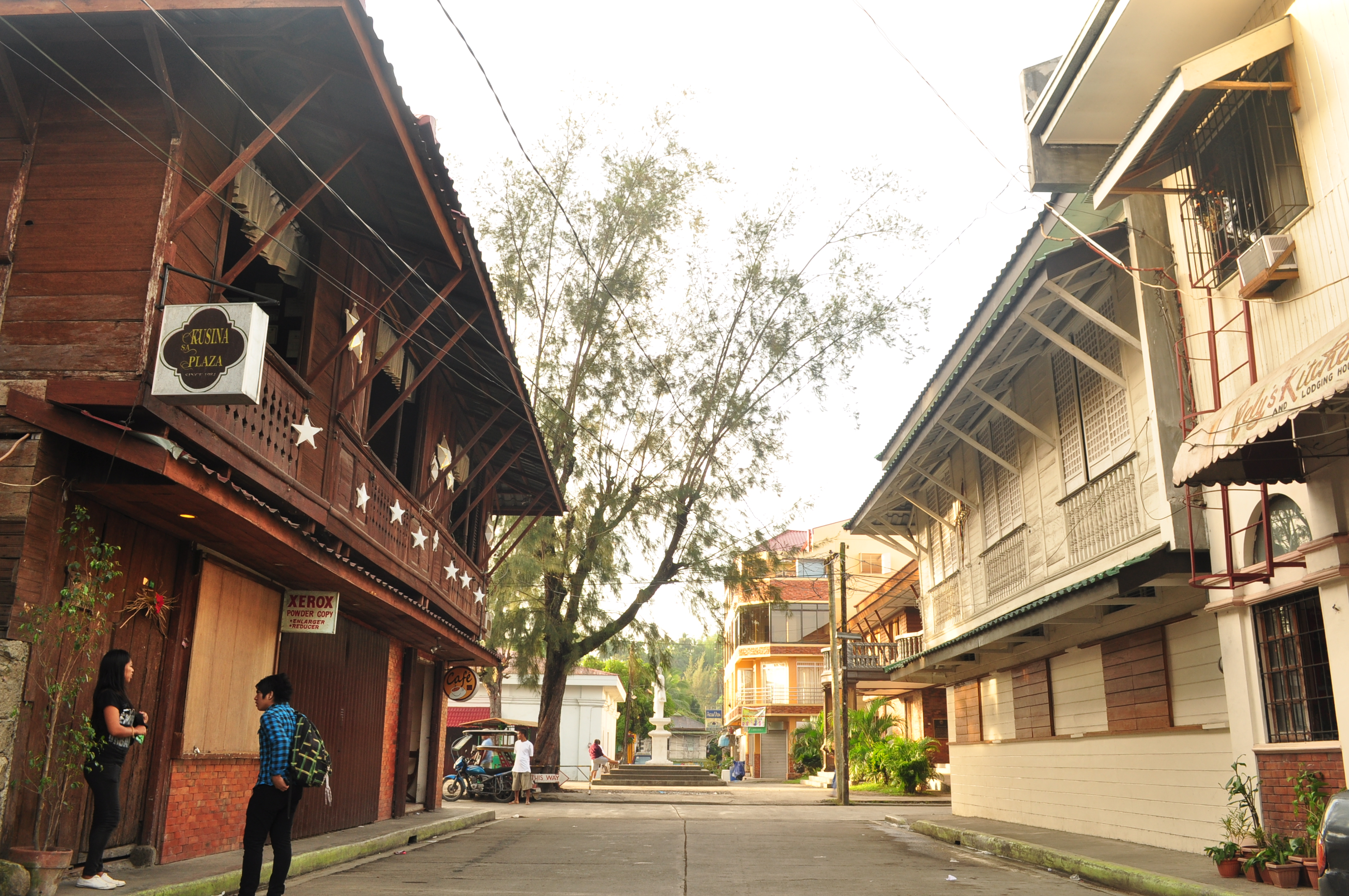
Ancestral Houses of Boac, Marinduque

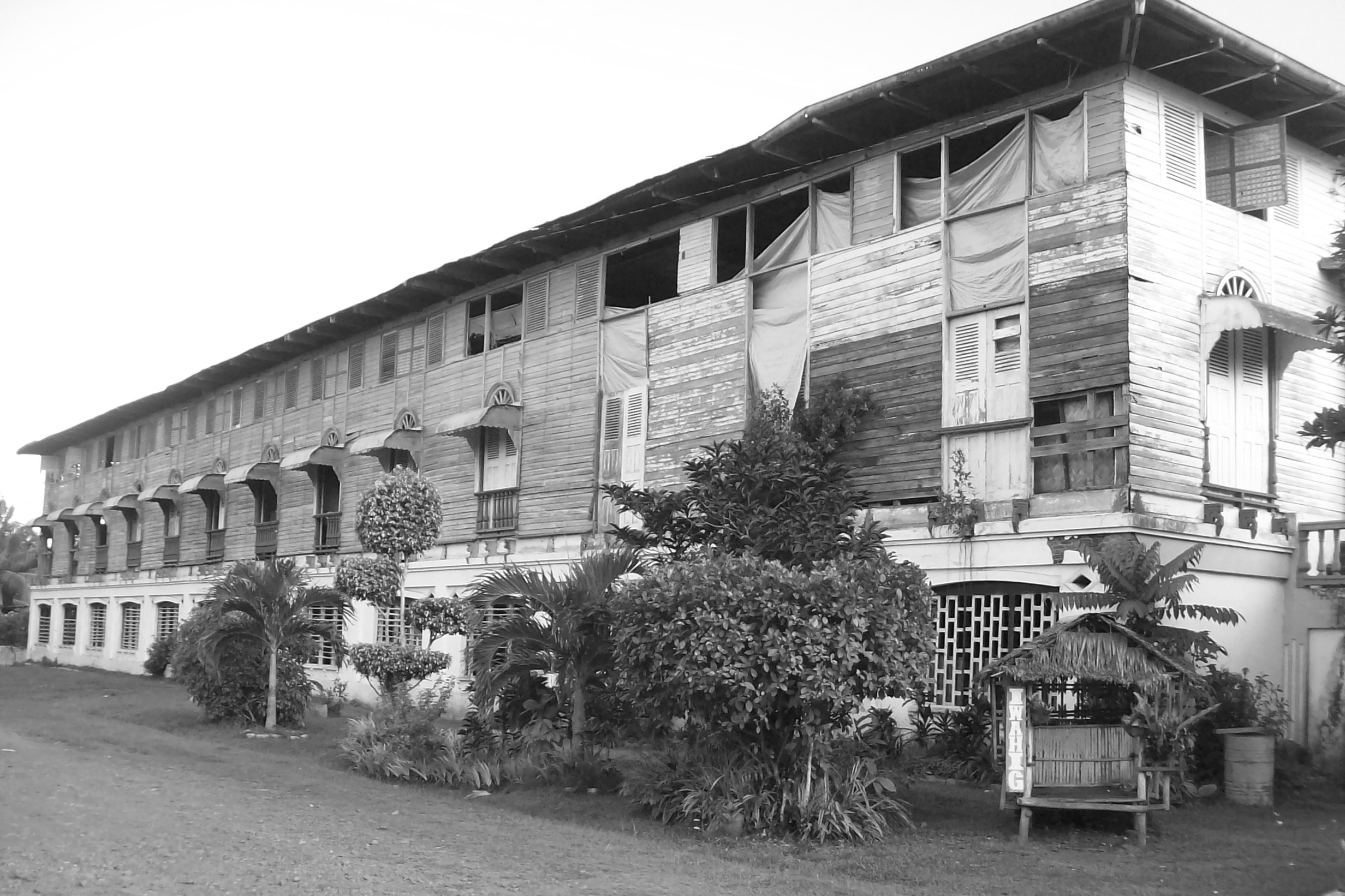
Puerto Princesa, Palawan

==== Central Luzon ====
The bahay na bato in Bulacan and the rest of Central Luzon are famous for their carvings. The most notable ones are in the Malolos, in its heritage core, where ancestral houses are located. Since adobe lends itself to sculpture, houses in Bulacan had façades decorated with carved flowers, leaves, Classical motifs, Mudéjar motifs and religious symbols.

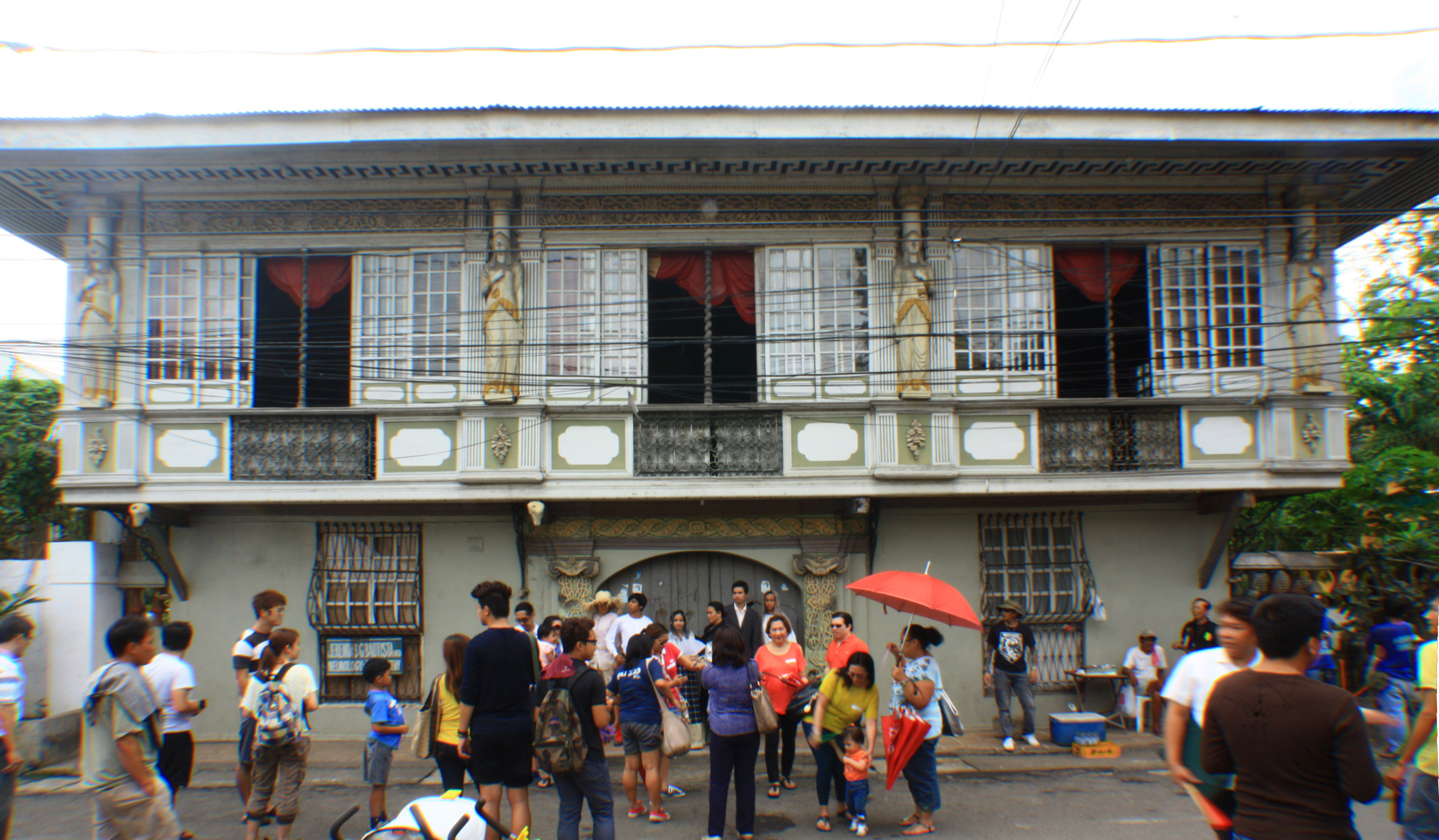
Malolos, Bulacan

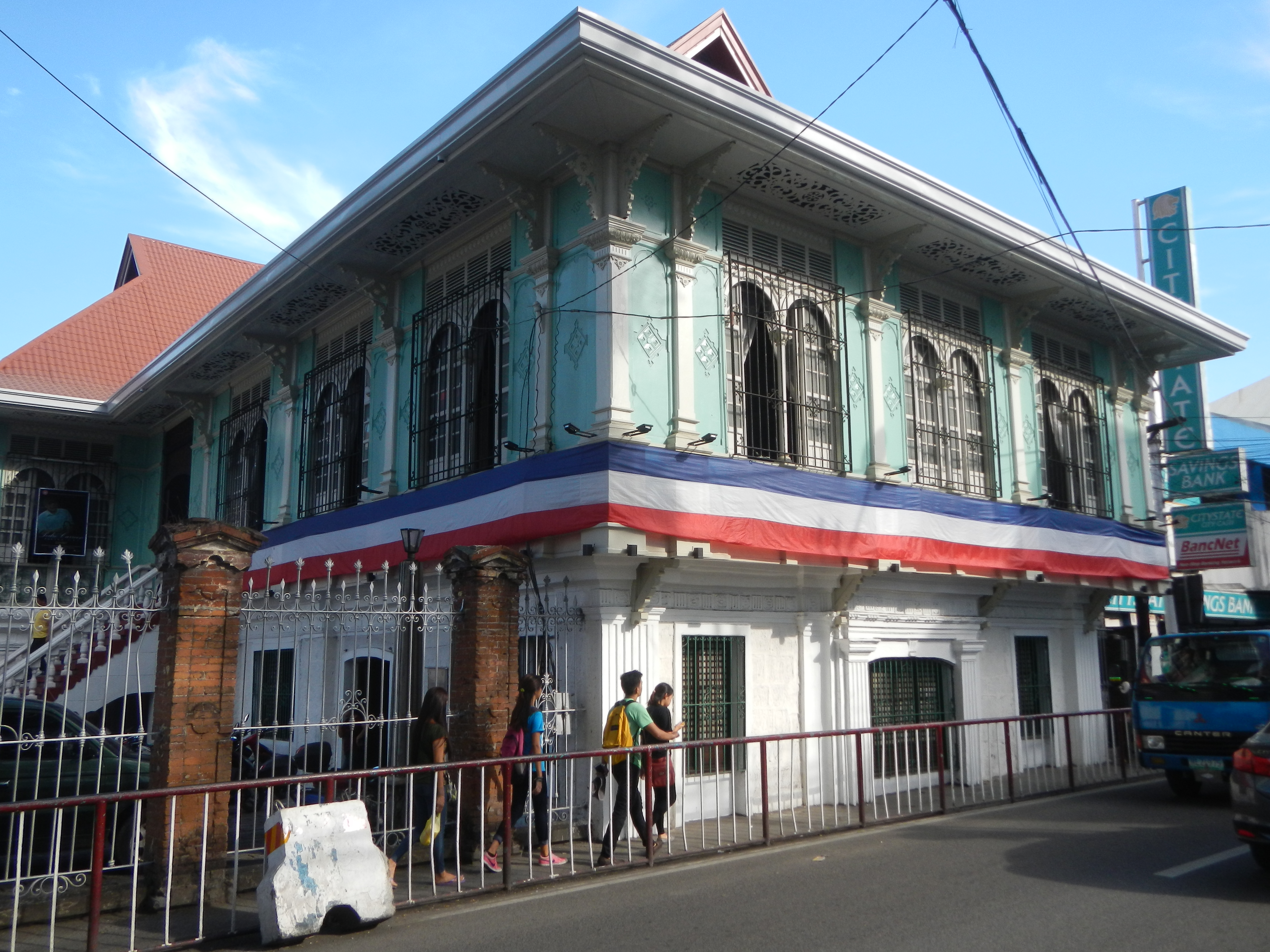
Baliuag Museum and Library

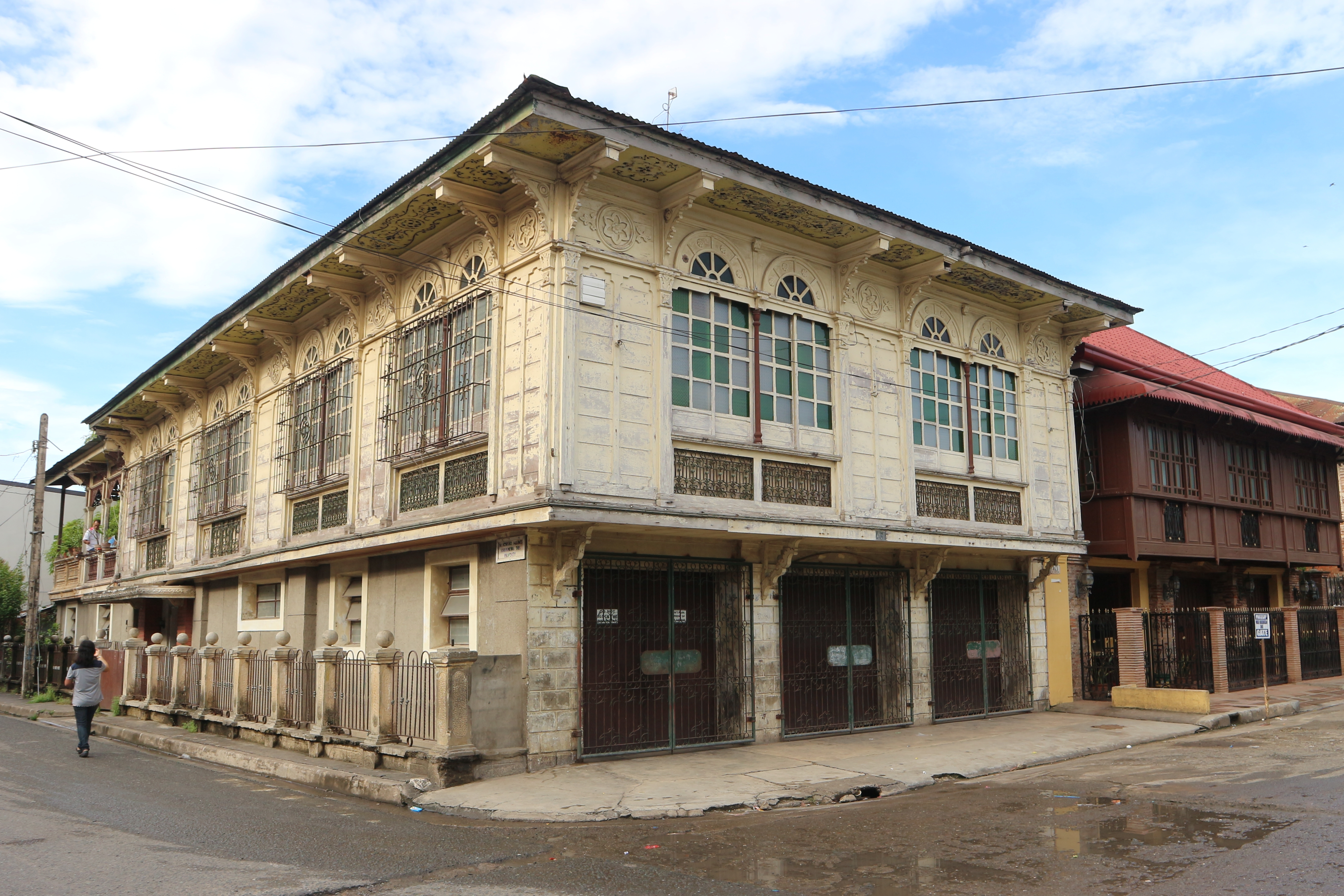
Gapan, Nueva Ecija

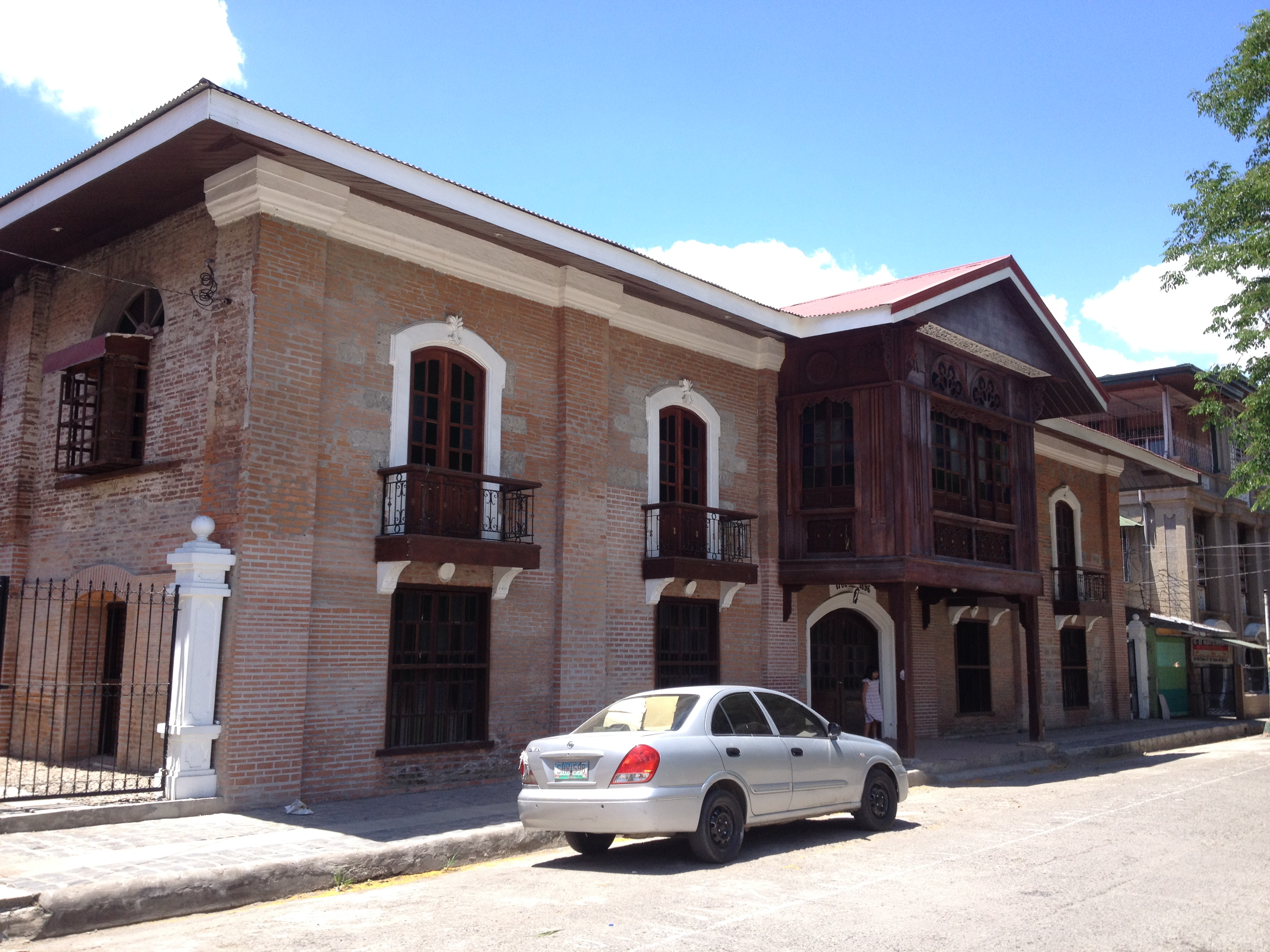
Historic center of Gapan

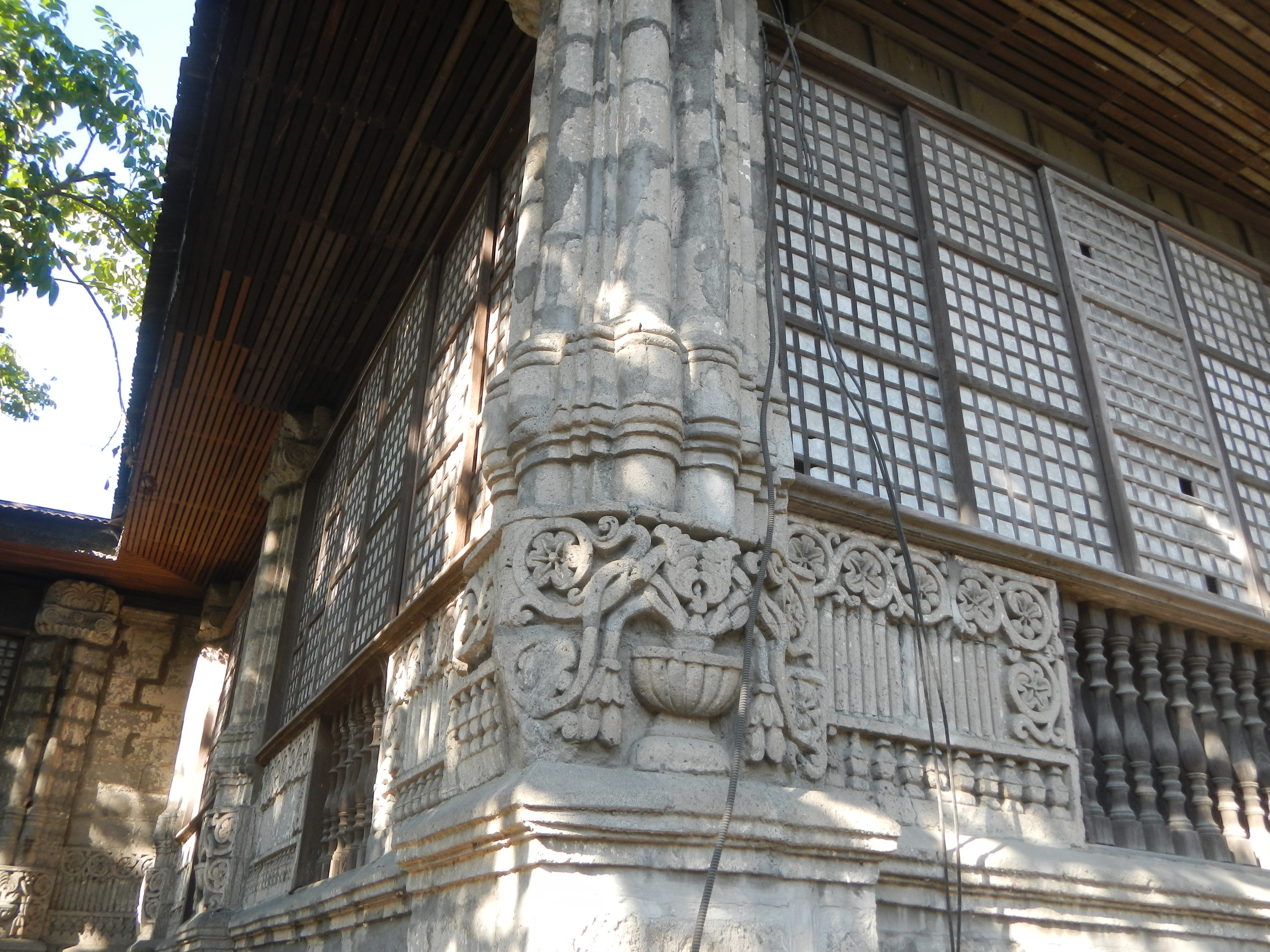
Bustos, Bulacan

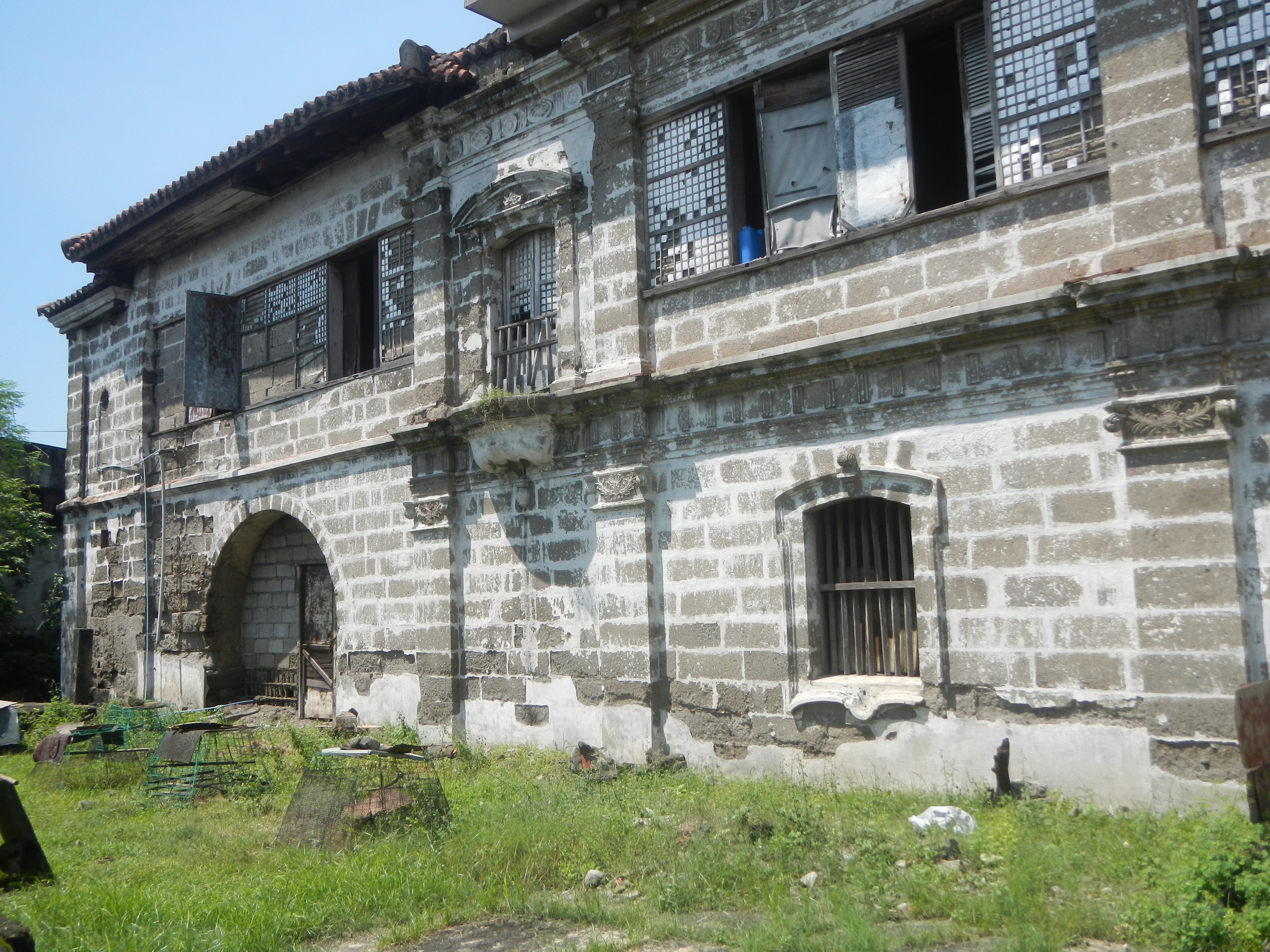
Constantino House, Balagtas, Bulacan

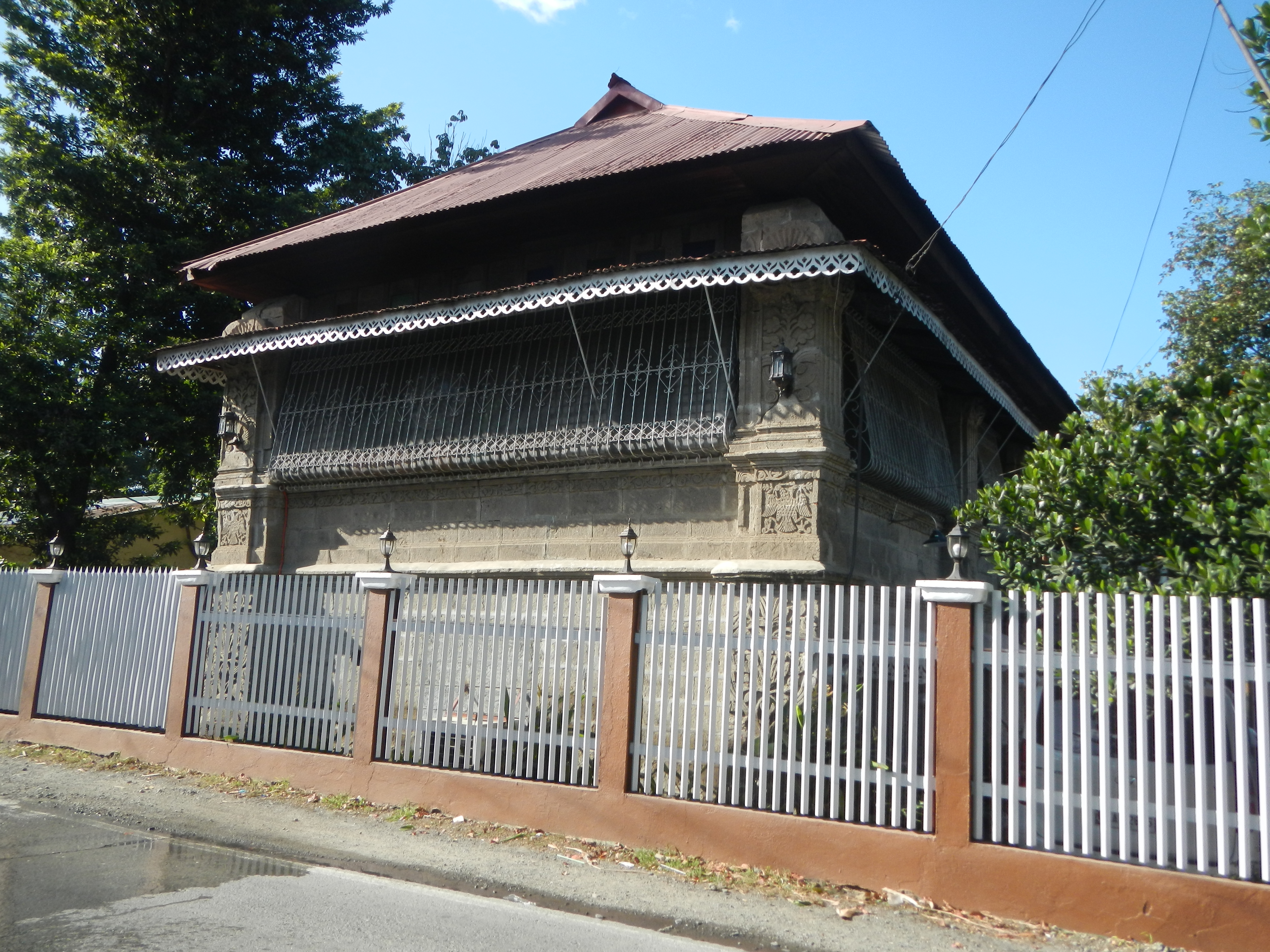
Bonga Menor Mayor Perez Ancestral Houses, Bustos, Bulacan

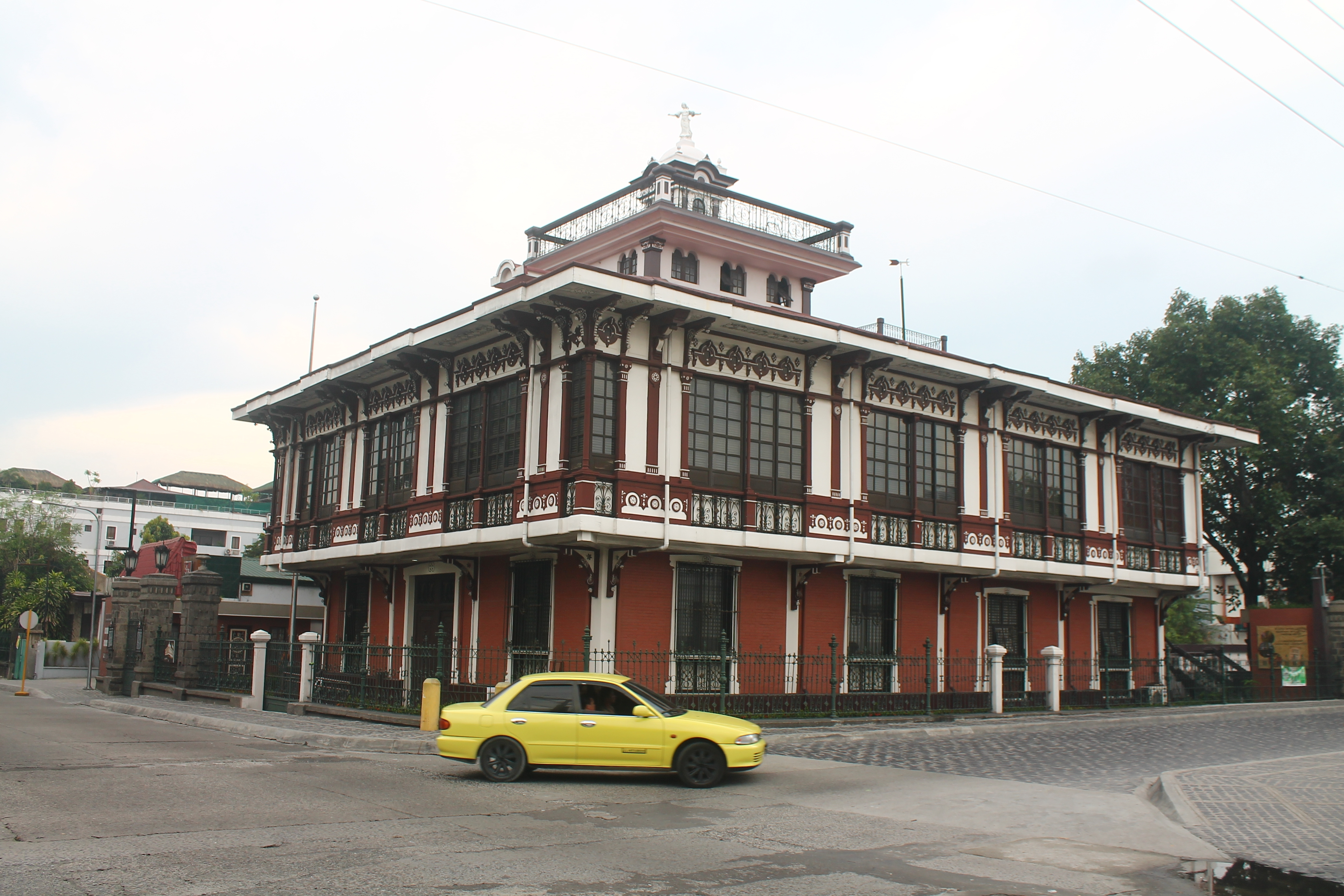
Pamintuan Mansion, Angeles, Pampanga

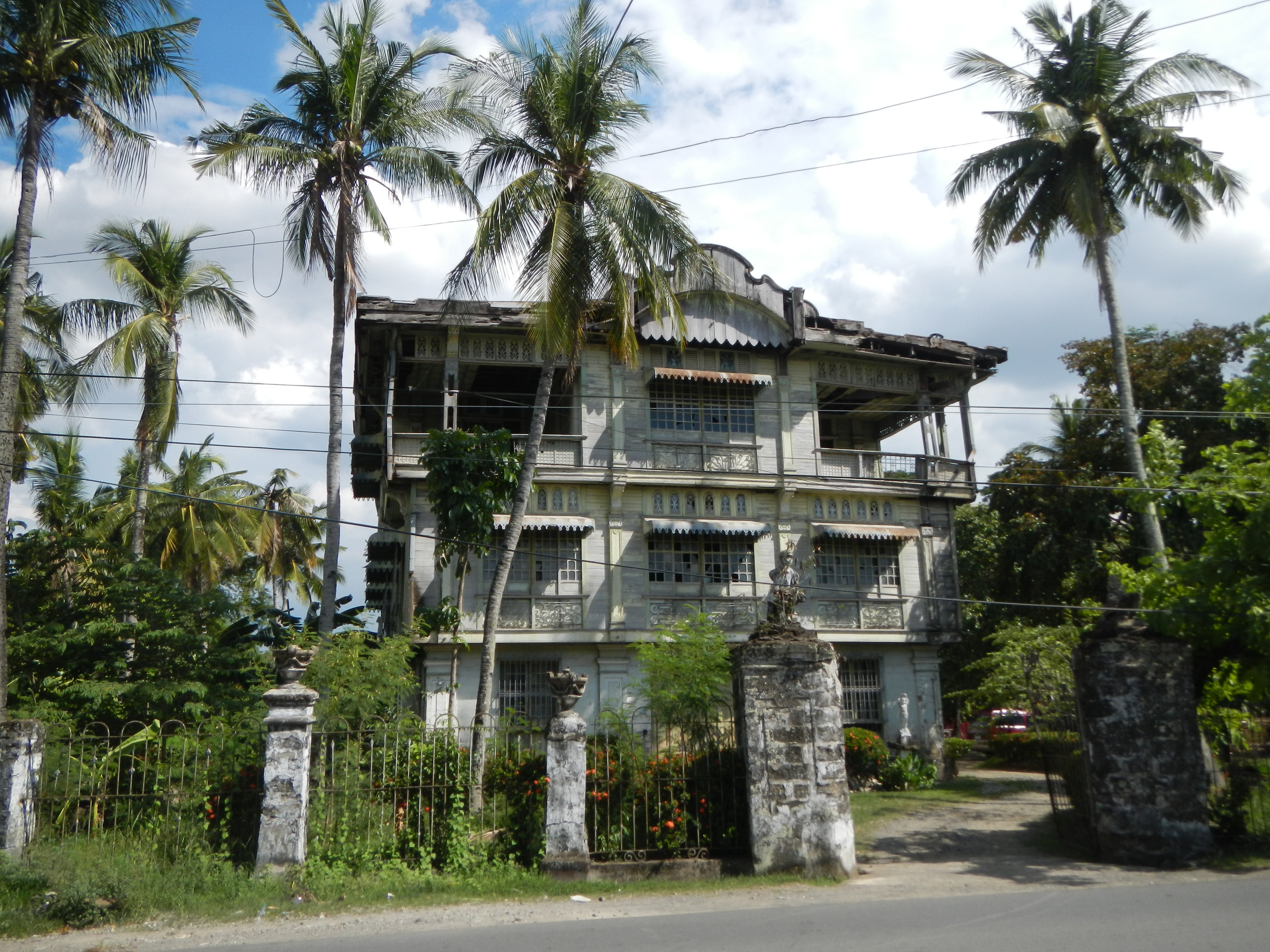
Catalino Sevilla House, San Miguel, Bulacan

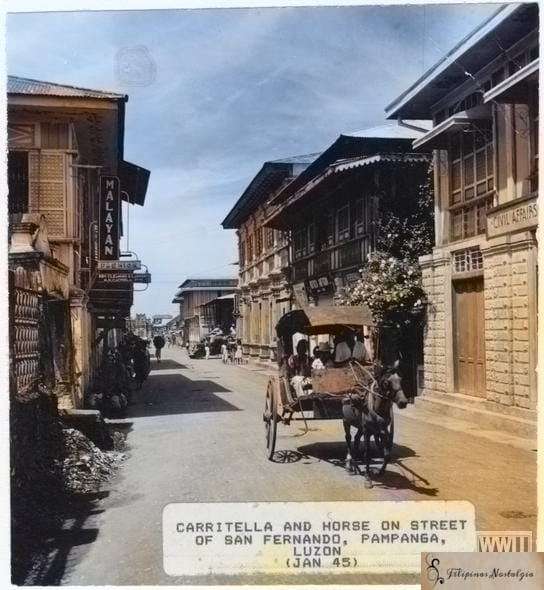
Street of San Fernando, Pampanga 1945.

==== Bicol ====
Many constructions in the Bicol peninsula took advantage of the abundant volcanic stone from nearby volcanoes. One characteristic of houses in Bicol is that ground-floor overhangs are common, considering the region's rainy climate and decorations tend to be minimal for these houses. Larger towns in Bicol boast many bahay na bato homes.

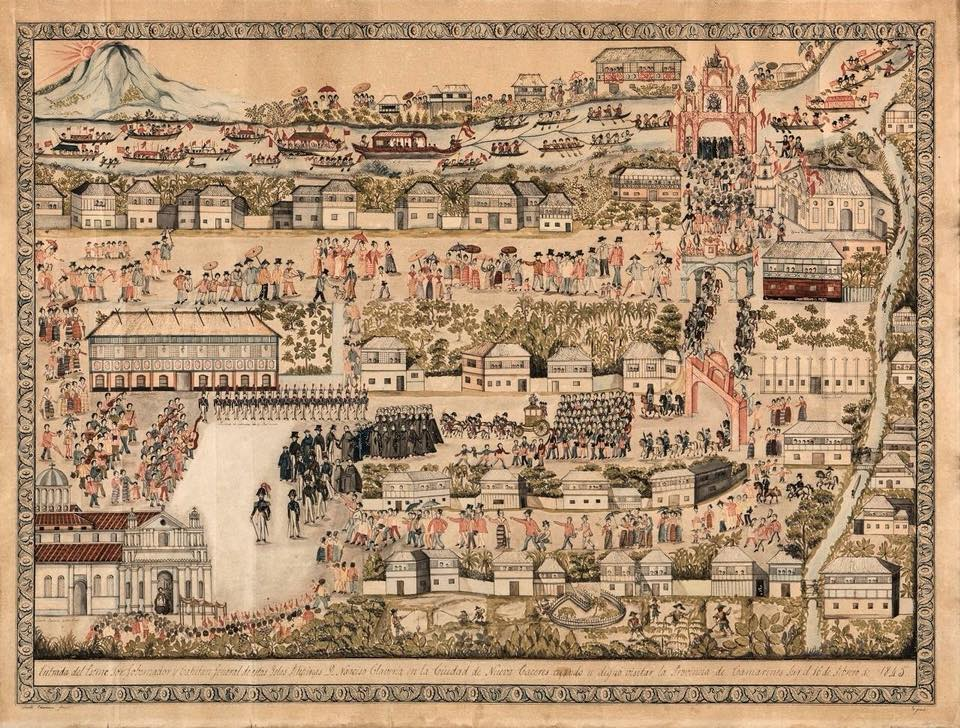
Painting of 1800s Nueva Caceres (modern-day Naga), with its buildings and houses

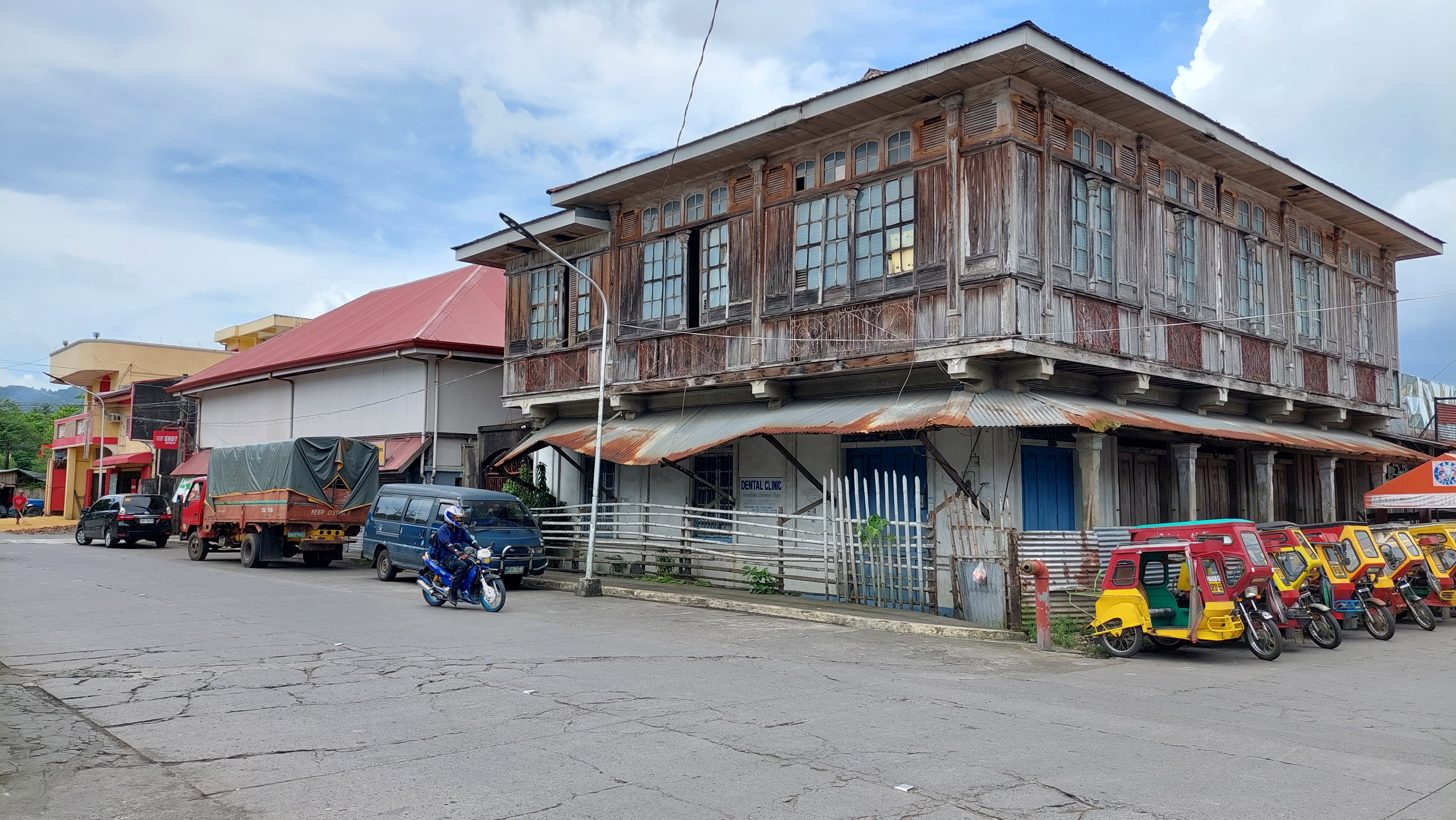
A dental clinic in Guinobatan, Albay

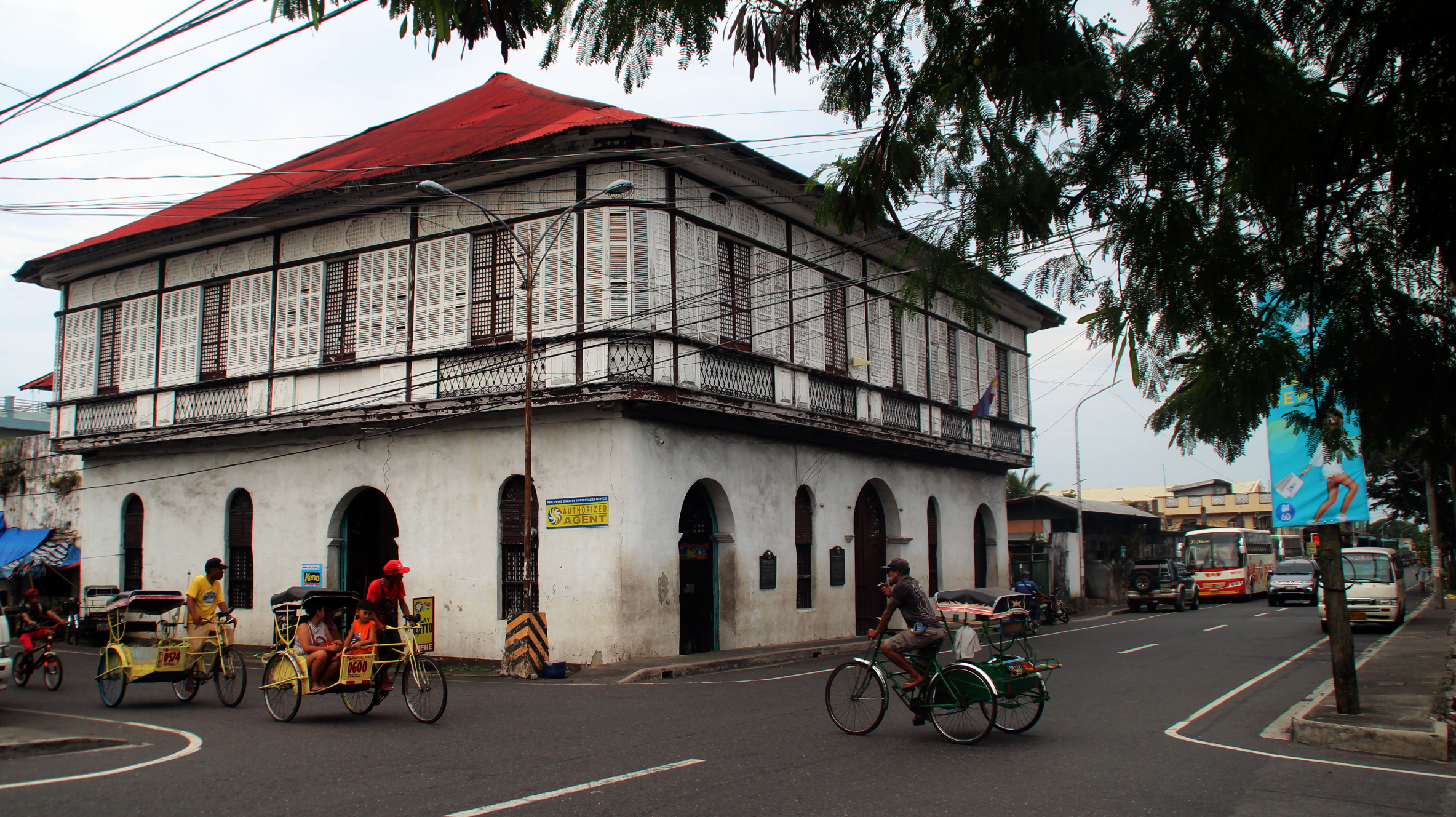
Manalang house, Tabaco City, Albay

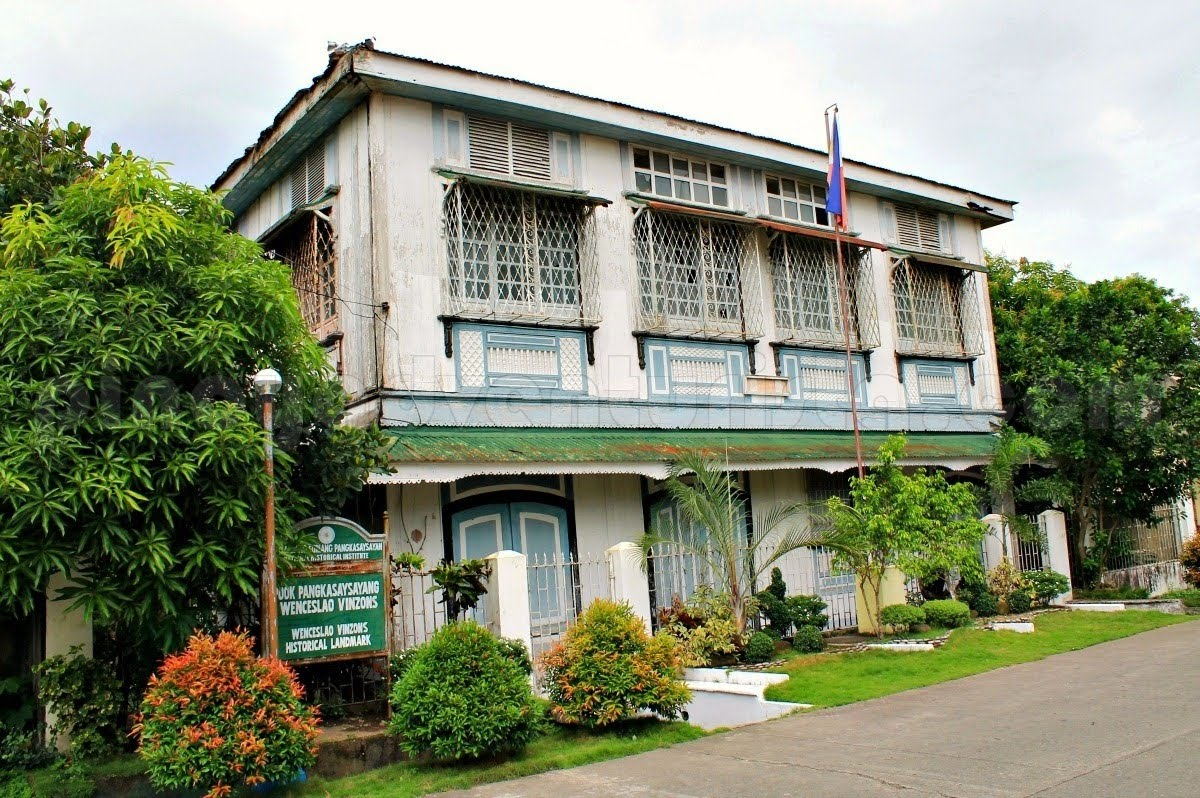
Vinzons House, Daet, Camarines Norte

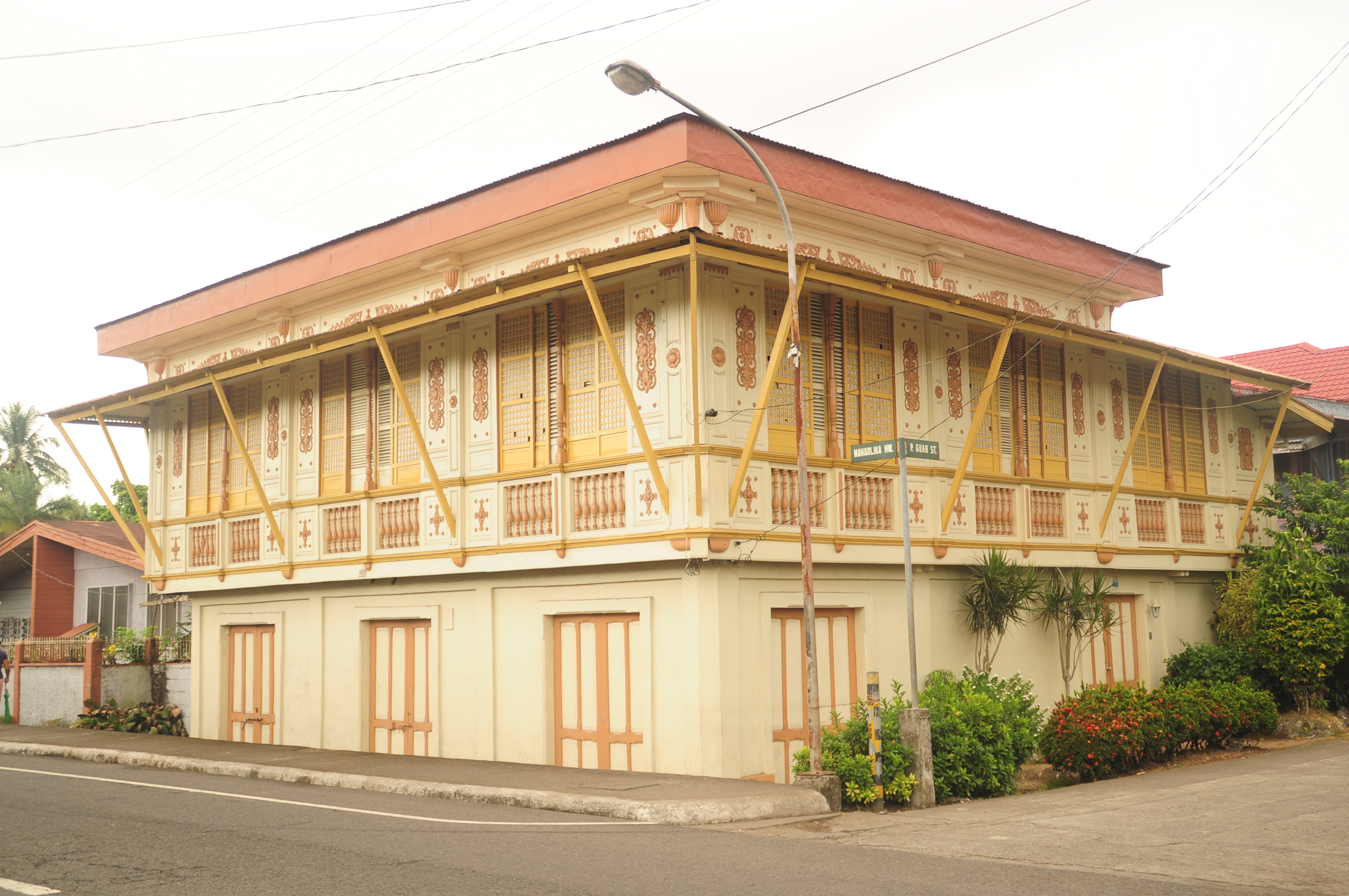
Juban, Sorsogon

==== Visayan ====
Most Visayan bahay na bato use coral stone, though many are still adobe and bricks. Cebu, Bohol, Negros, and Iloilo are famous for their bahay na bato houses. Throughout the Visayas, the craft of cutting coral stones was virtually elevated into a fine art, with blocks fitting so precisely into each other that not even a razor blade could be inserted between them. The material was so durable that it did not have to be protected with a layer of paletada. Non-wooden (stone), second level façade walls styles are also present outside in cebu particularly, the 1730 Jesuit house of Cebu. Aside from bahay na bato, Visayan noble settlements are also dominated by mansion-type payag (bahay kubo), which are built like bahay na bato but use wooden walls instead of stone walls covering the bottom floor. These arts were brought by the Visayan settlers to the coastal towns of Mindanao.

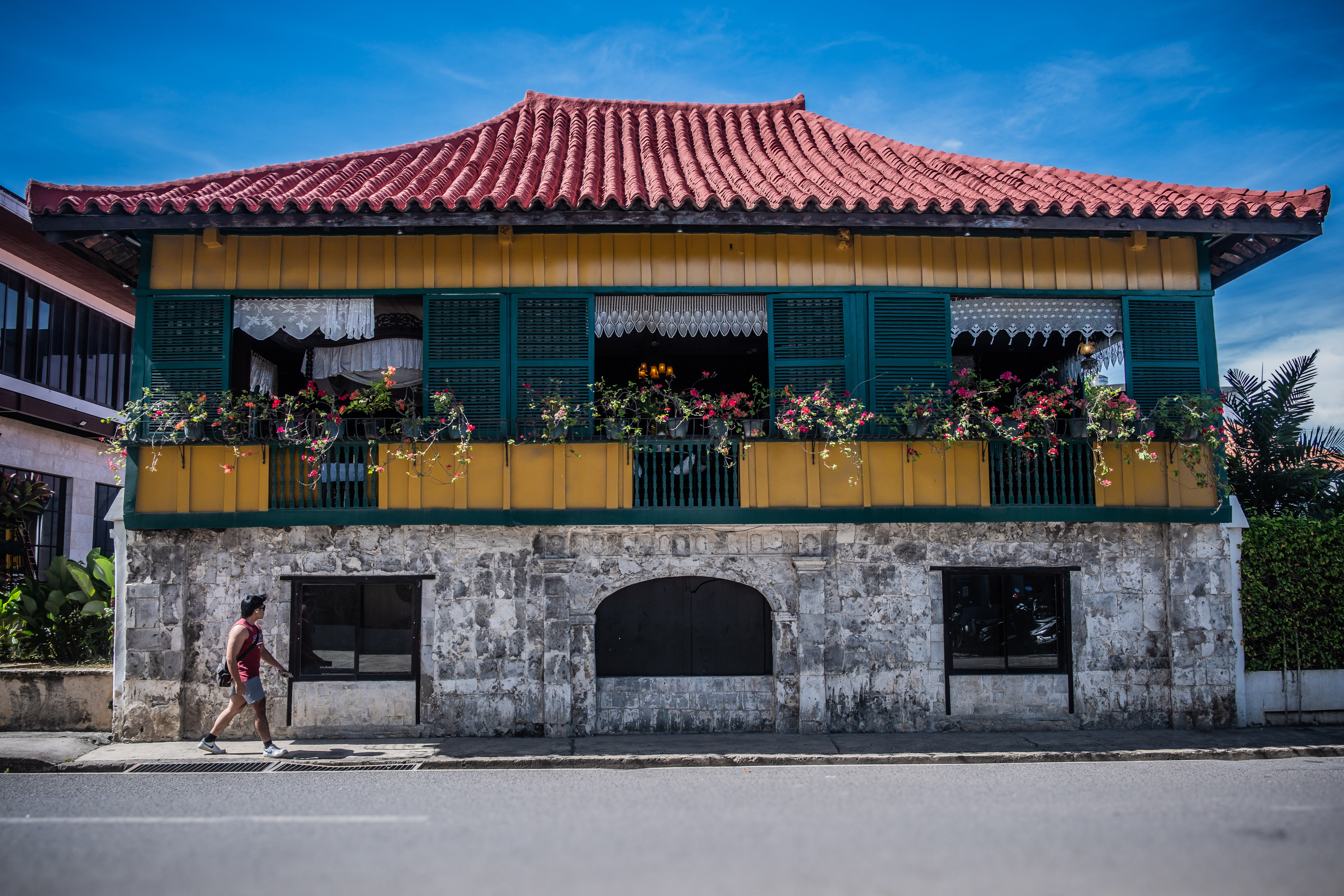
Casa Gorordo Museum

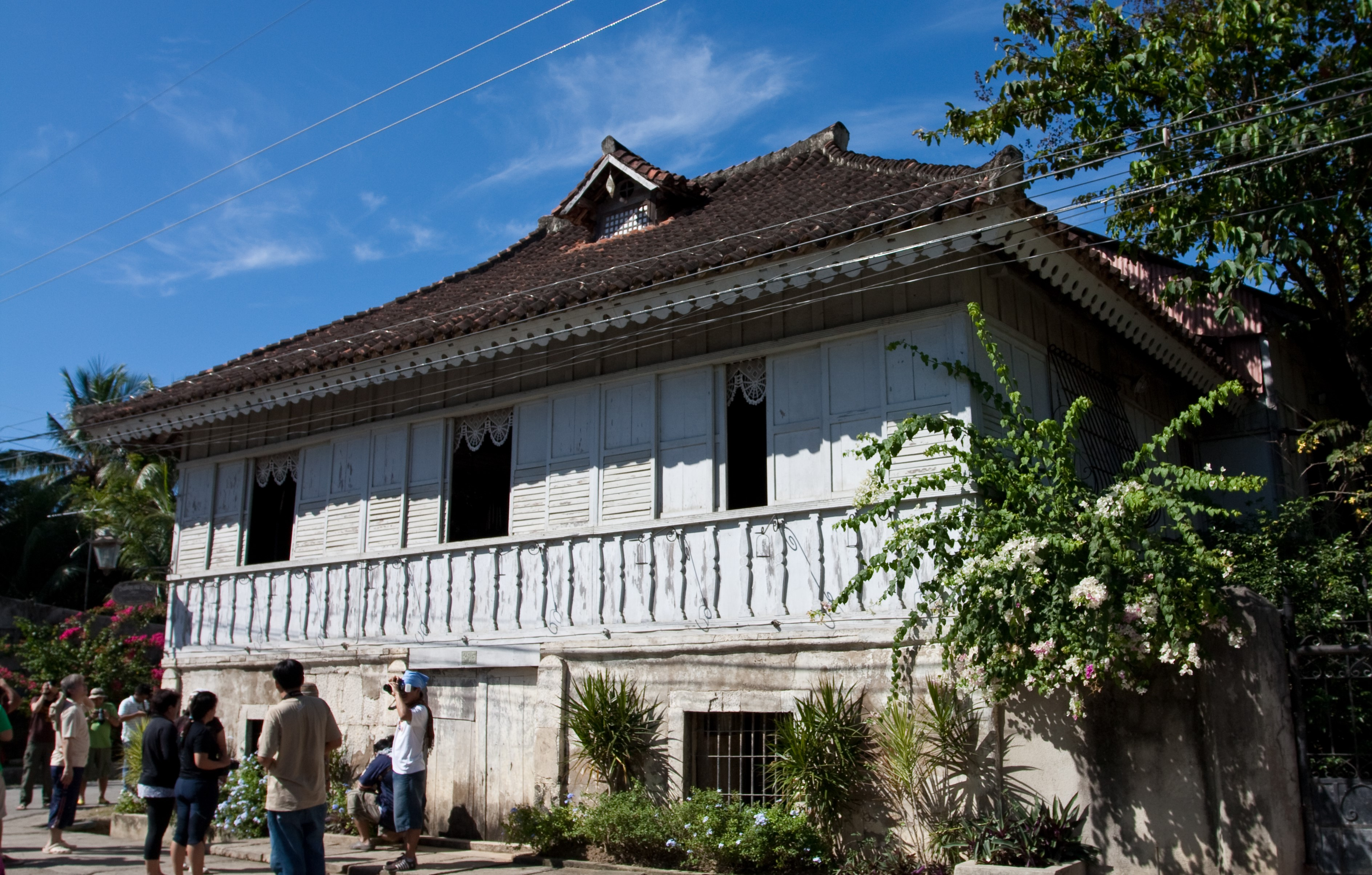
Bahay na bato in Cebu with its Coral stones typical to Visayas

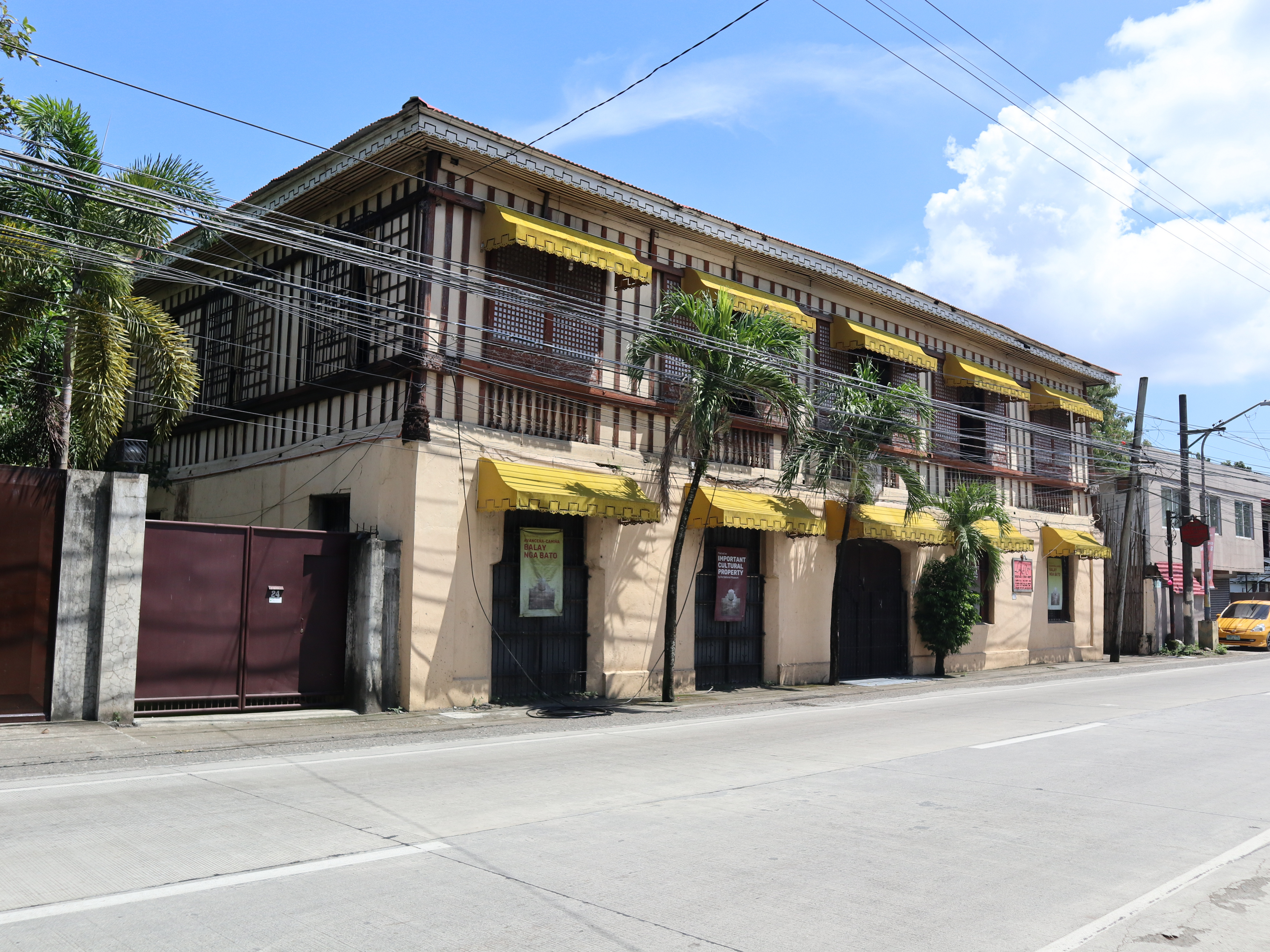
Avanceña ancestral house (Camiña Balay Nga Bato)

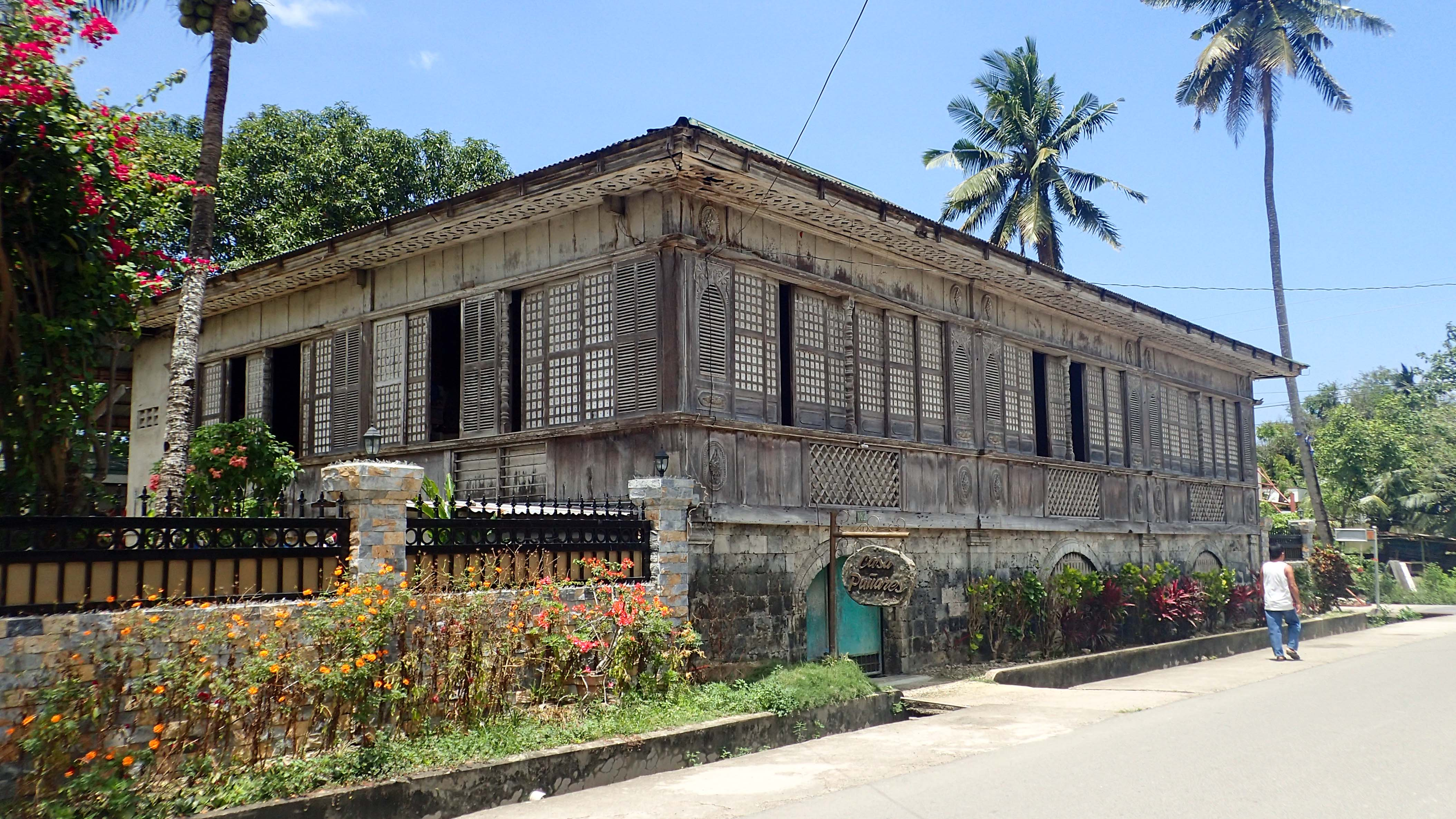
Panares ancestral house

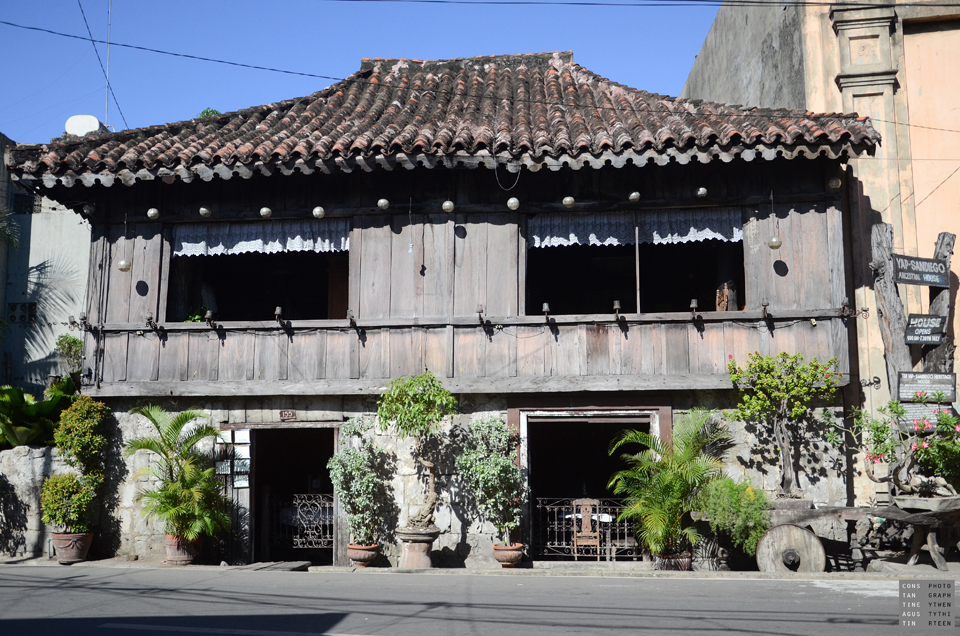
Yap-San Diego House

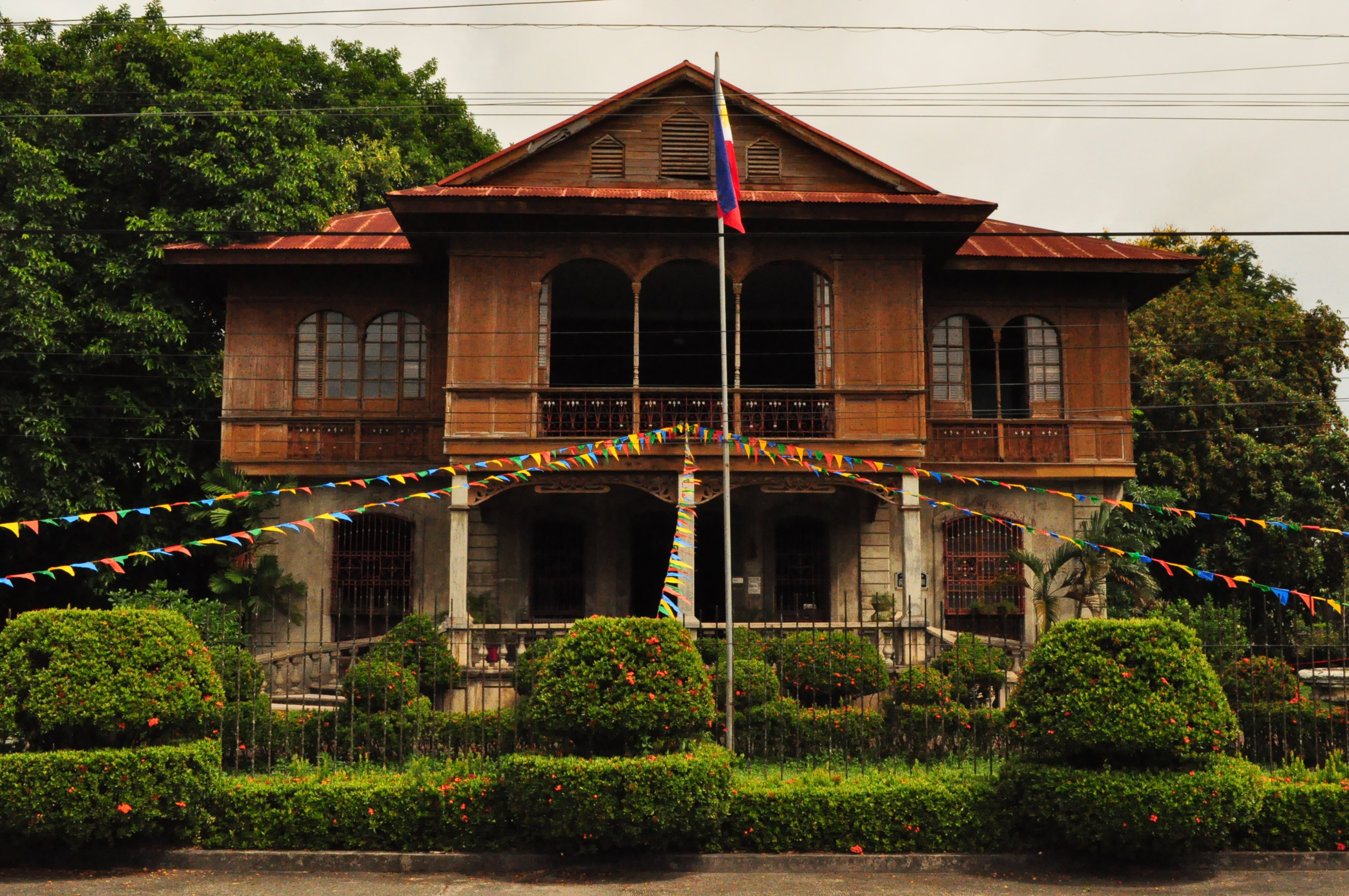
Victor Fernandez Gaston ancestral house, Silay, Negros

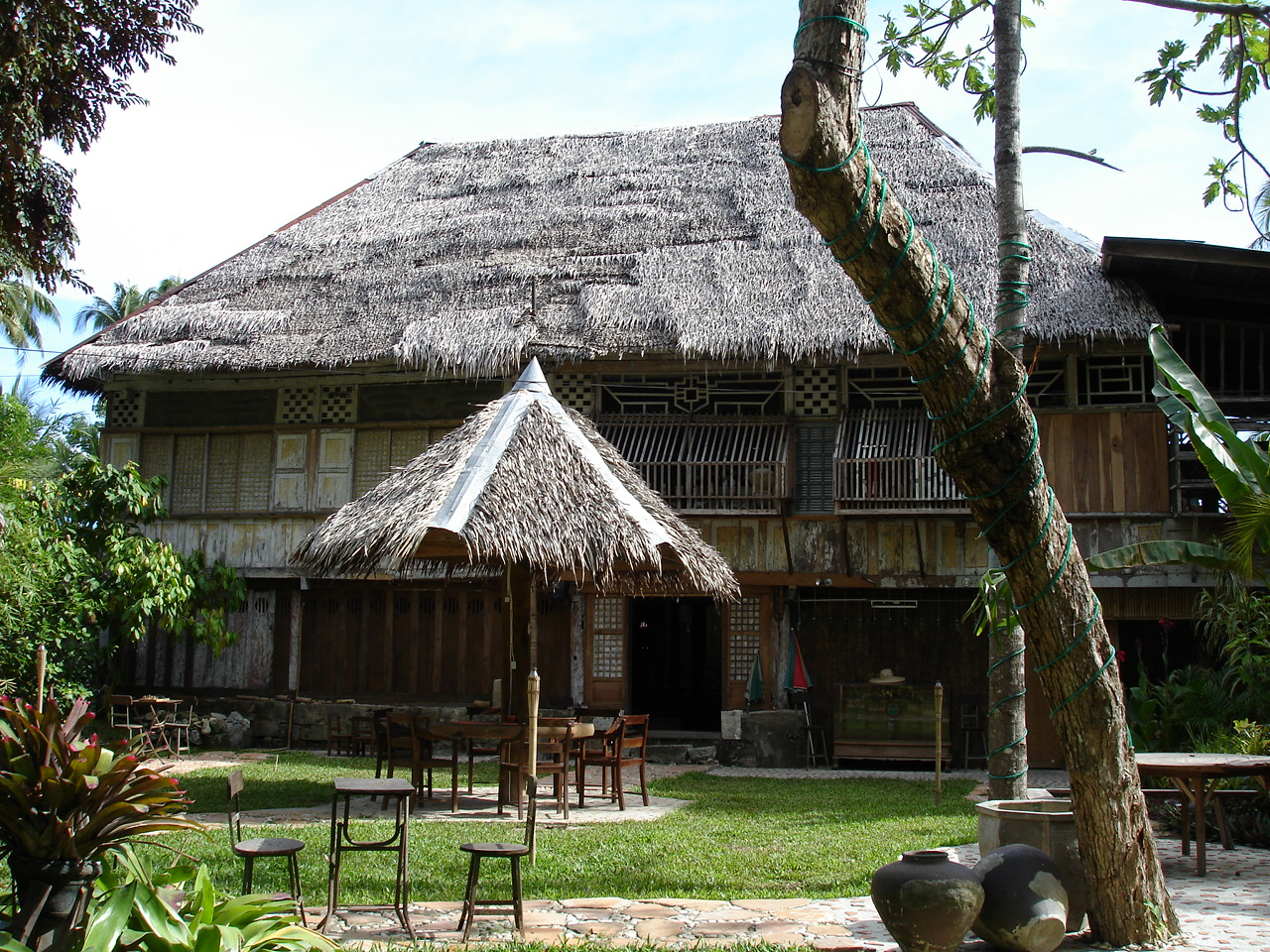
Clarin ancestral house in Bohol

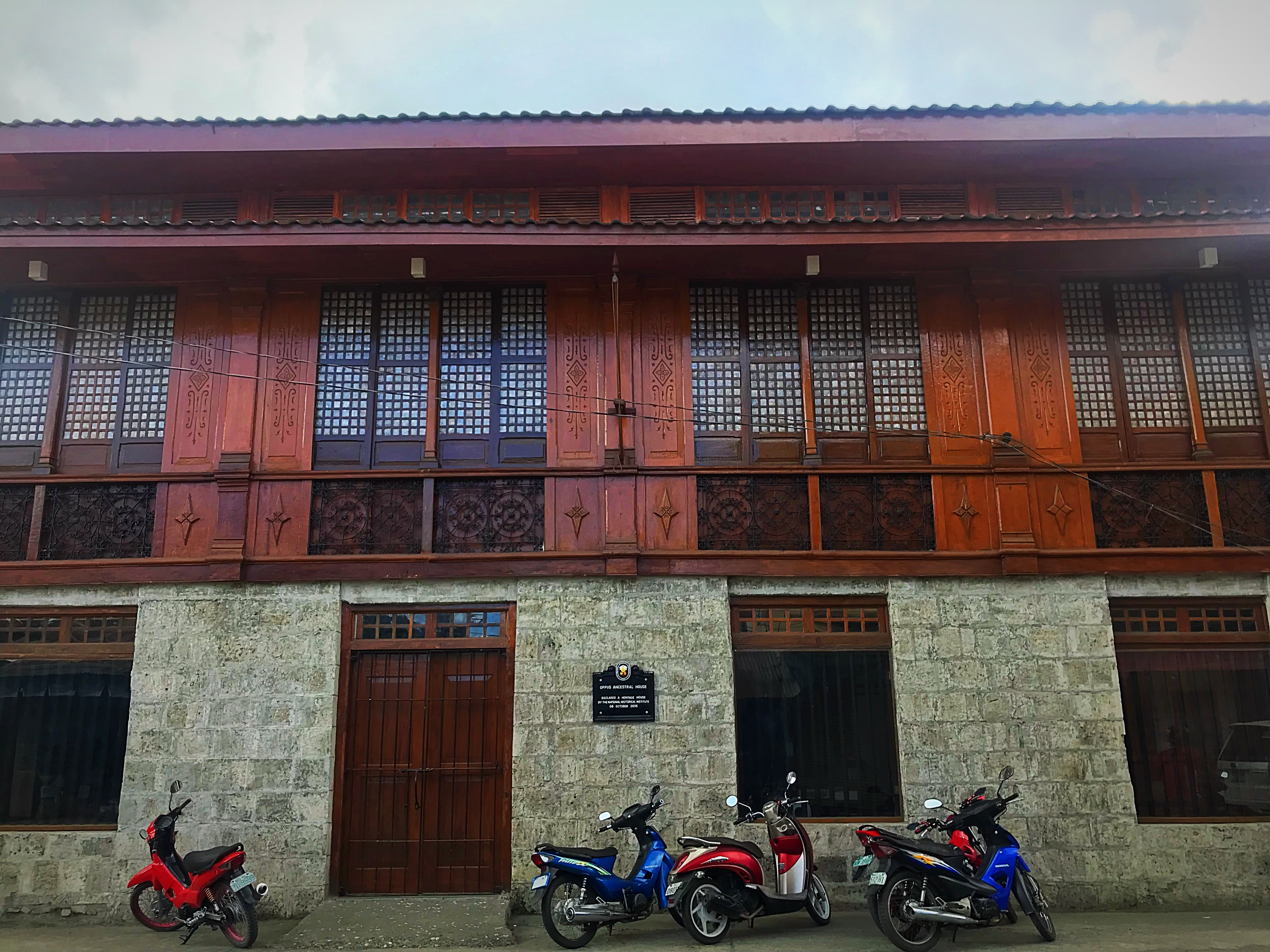
Oppus ancestral house in Maasin, Leyte (province)

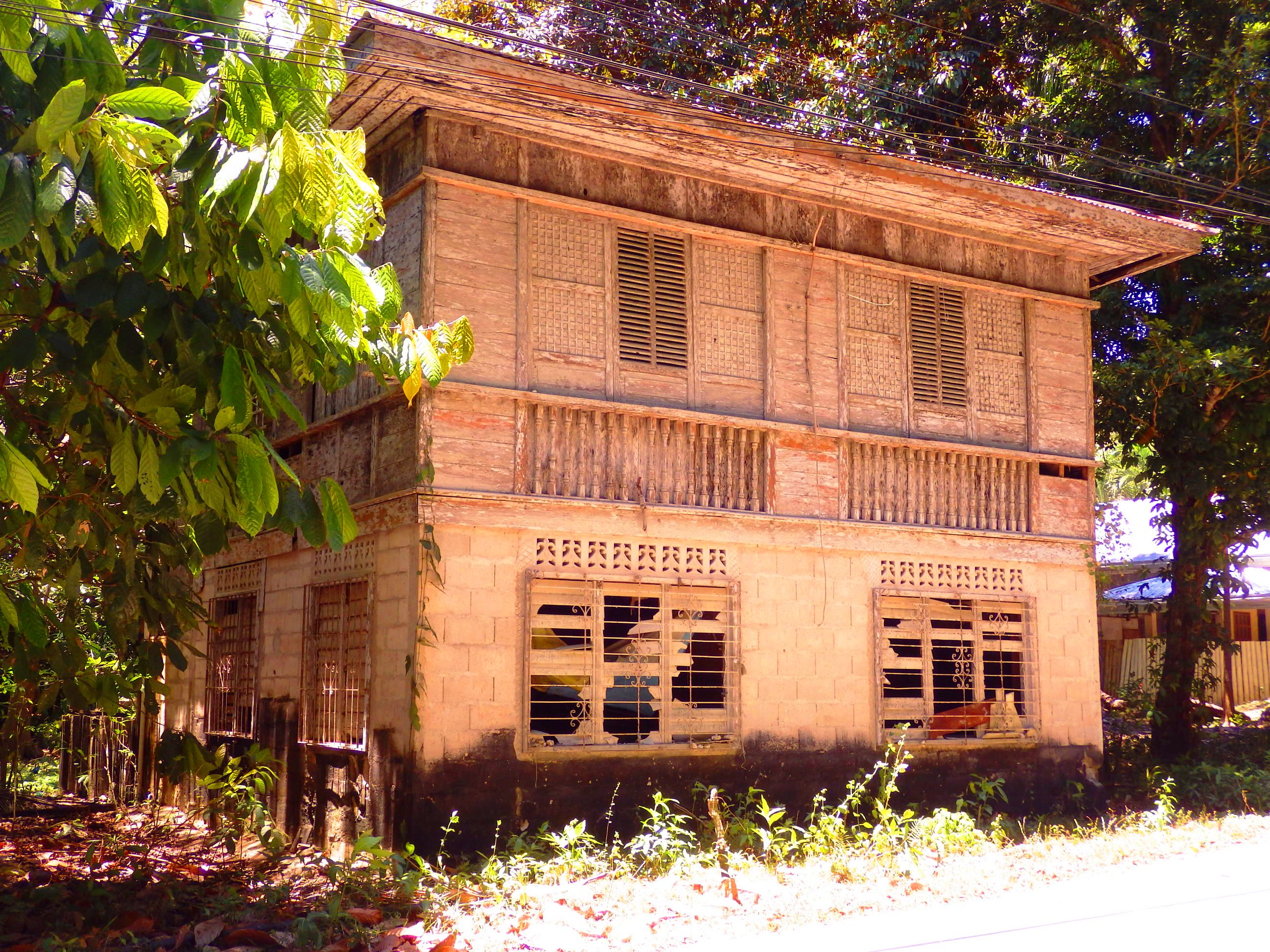
Bongabong house, Alburquerque, Bohol

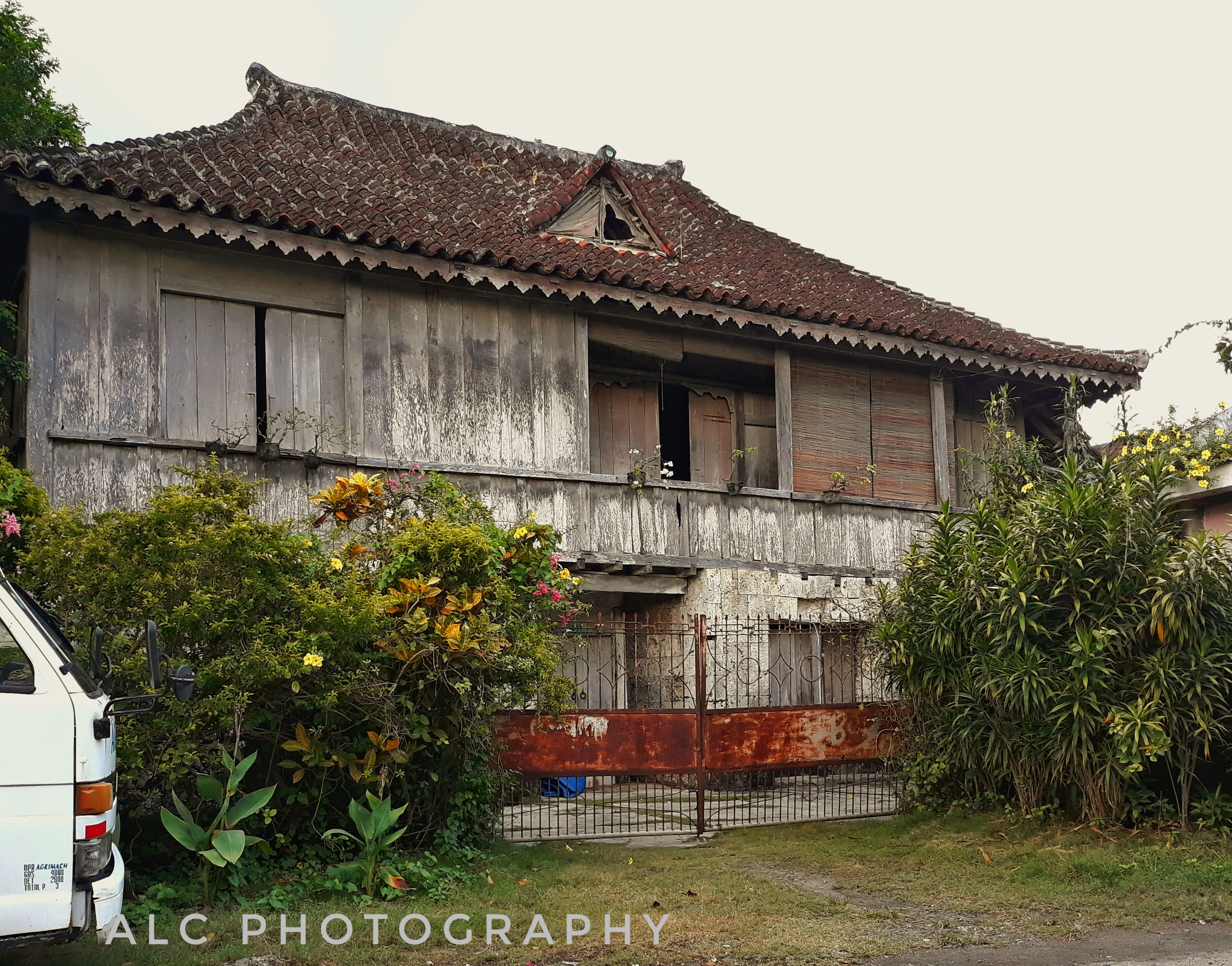
Casa Rocha, Bohol

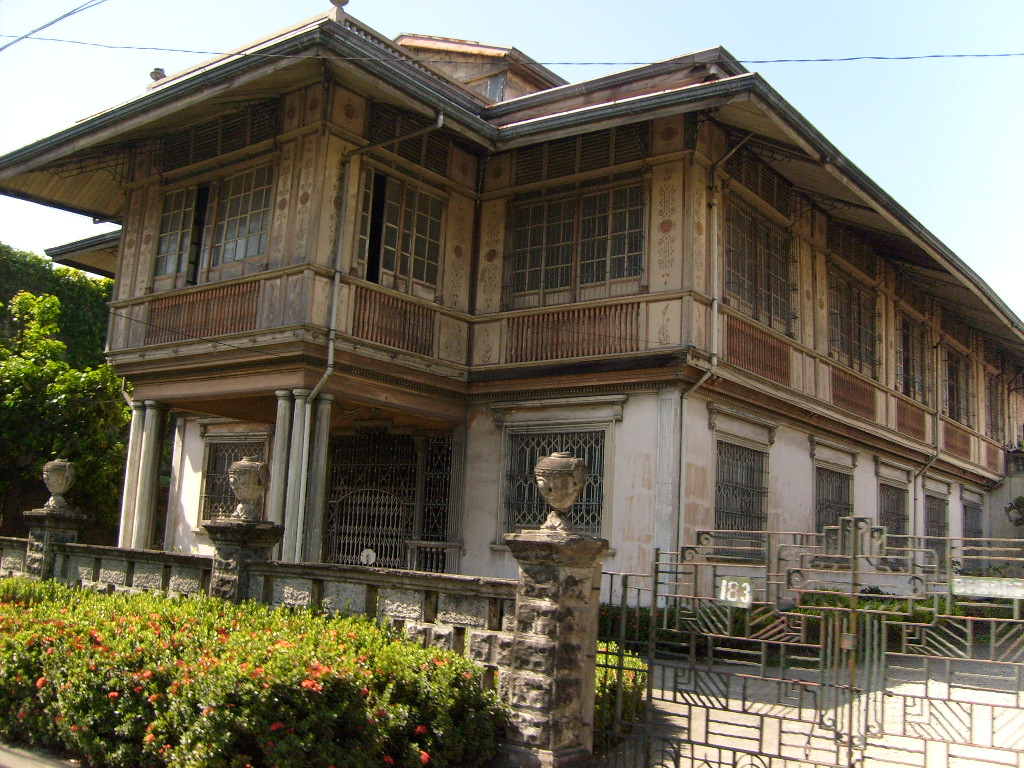
Ancestral house in Iloilo

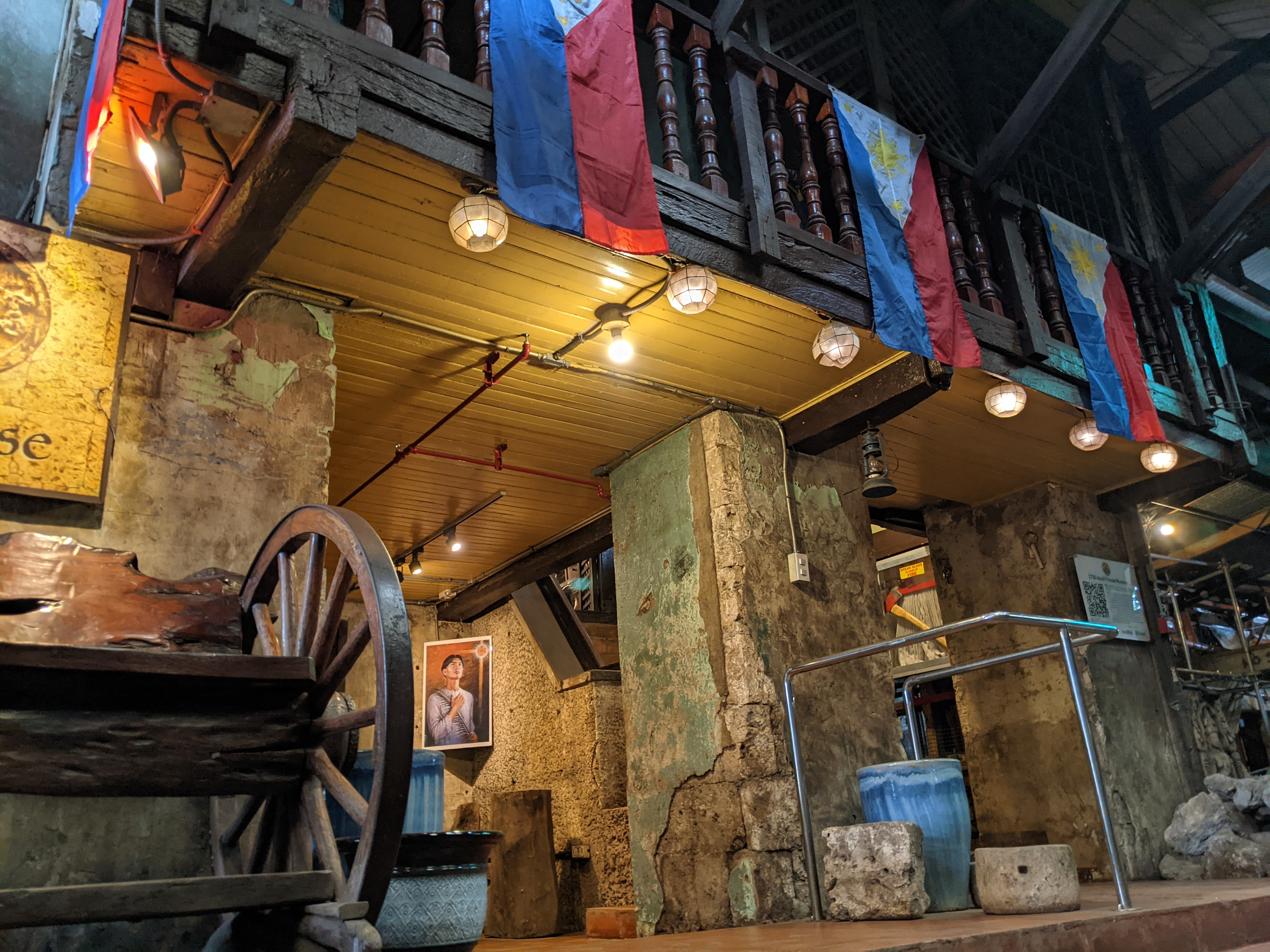
Jesuit house of 1730. Parian, Cebu.

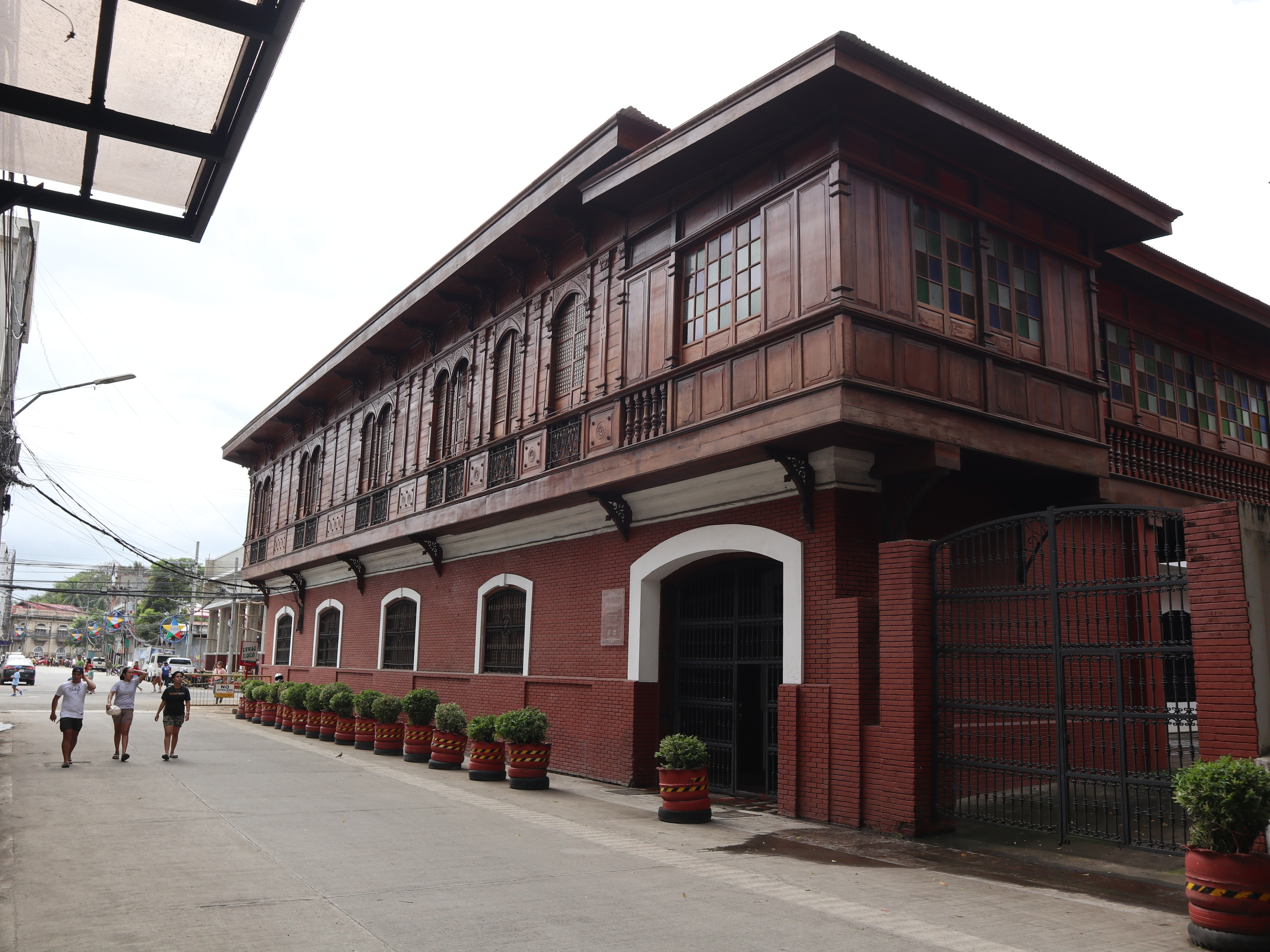
Elizalde Building

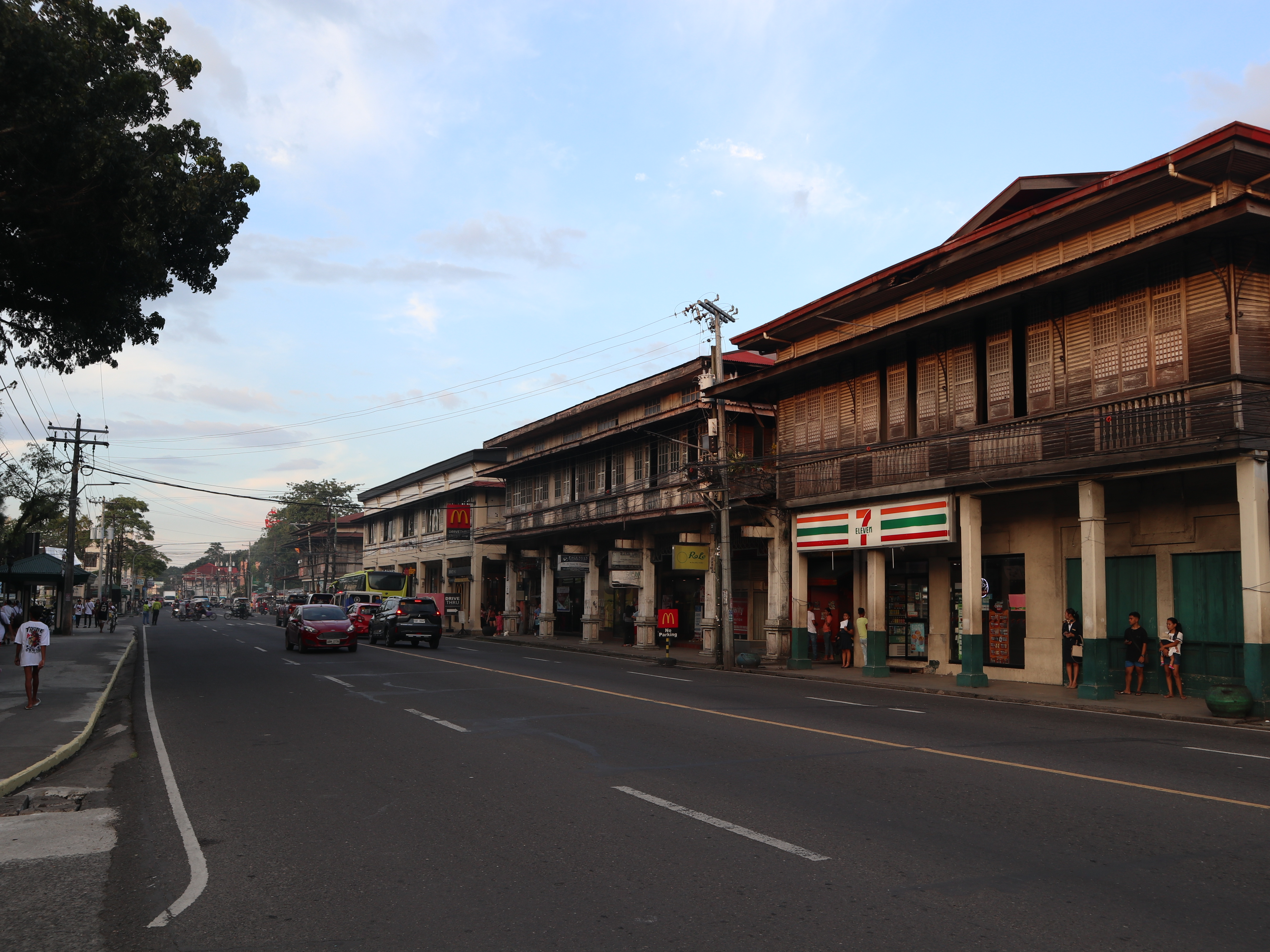
Silay, Negros Occidental

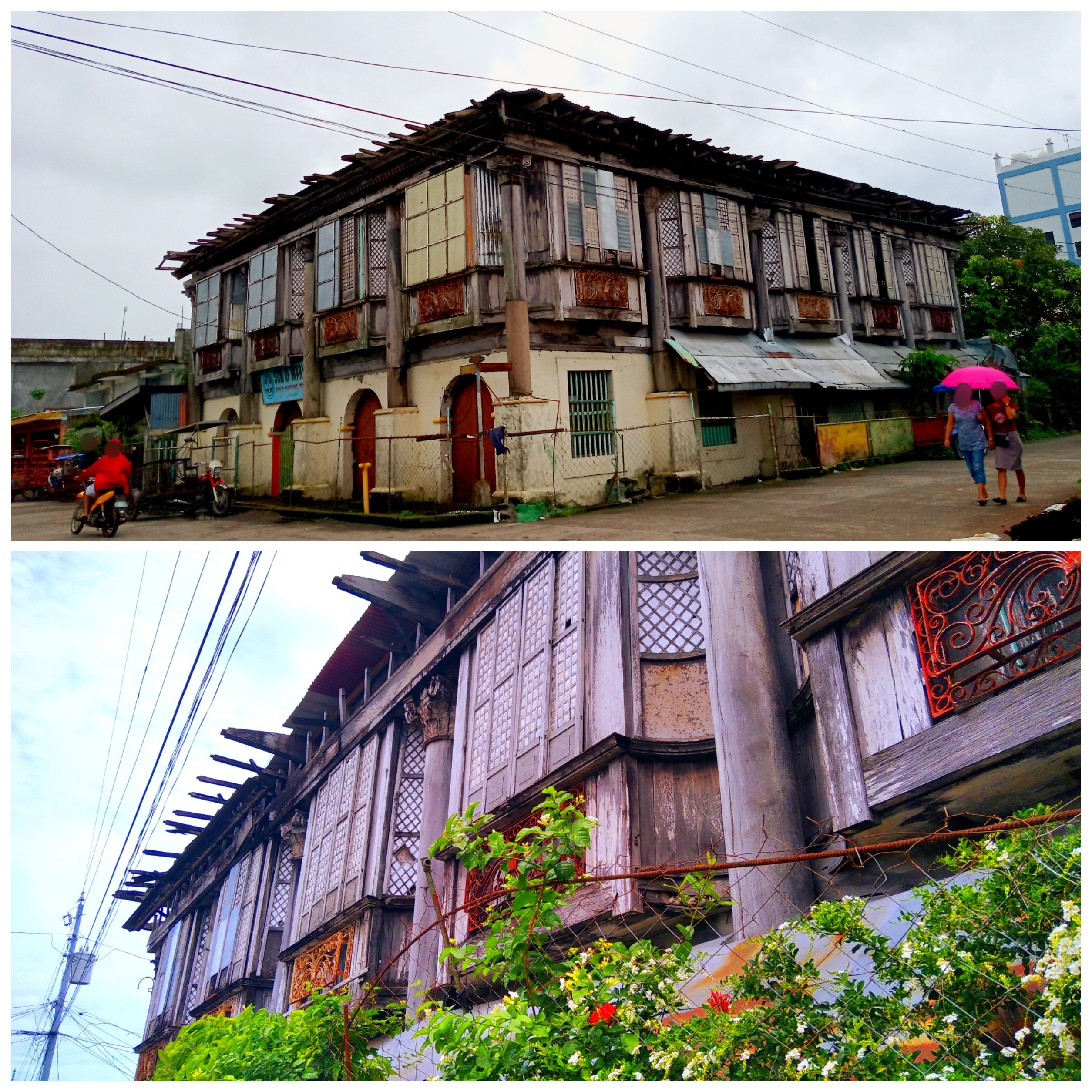
Gawas an Harige house in Carigara. Leyte

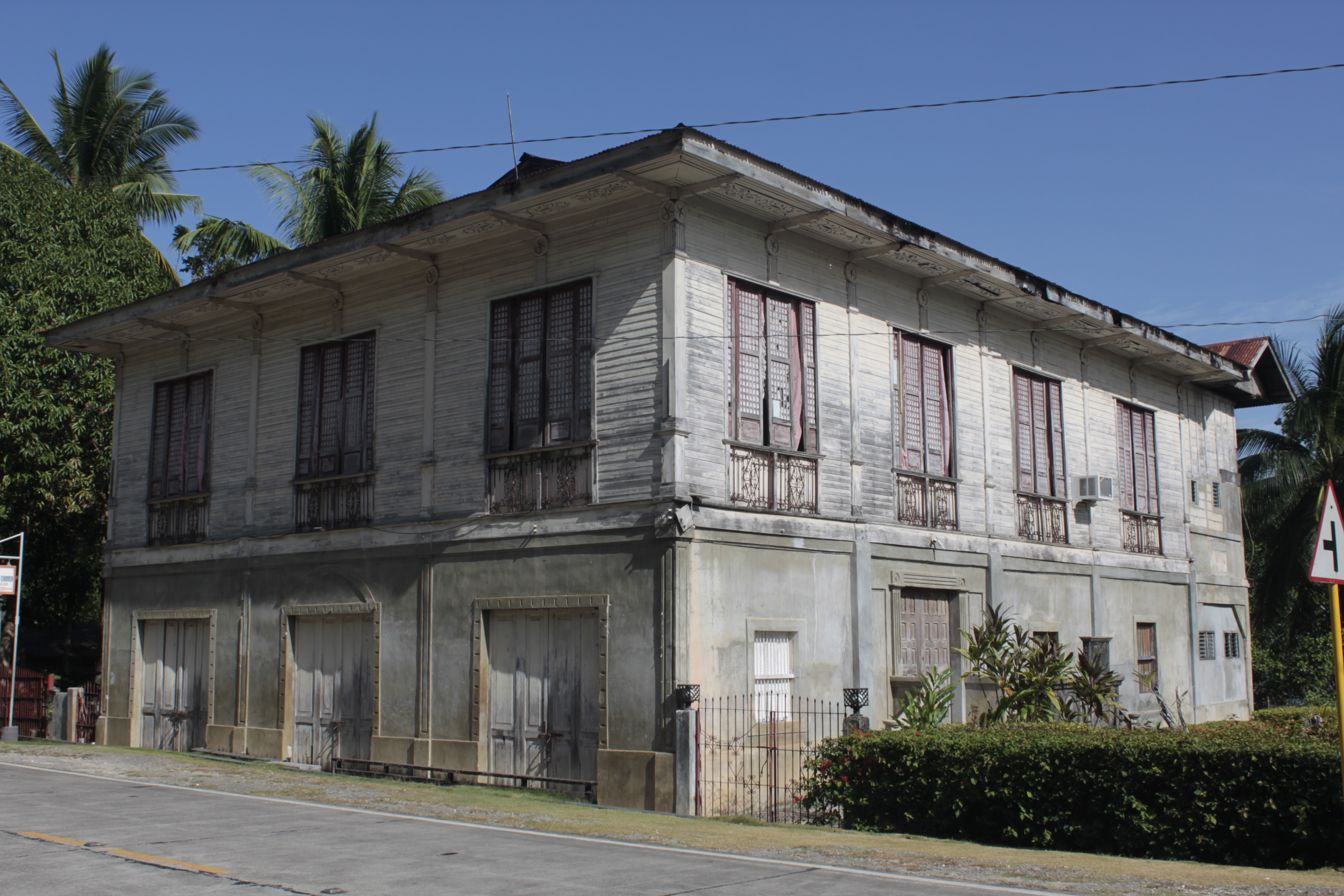
Bonifacio Jumawan Ancestral House, Siquijor

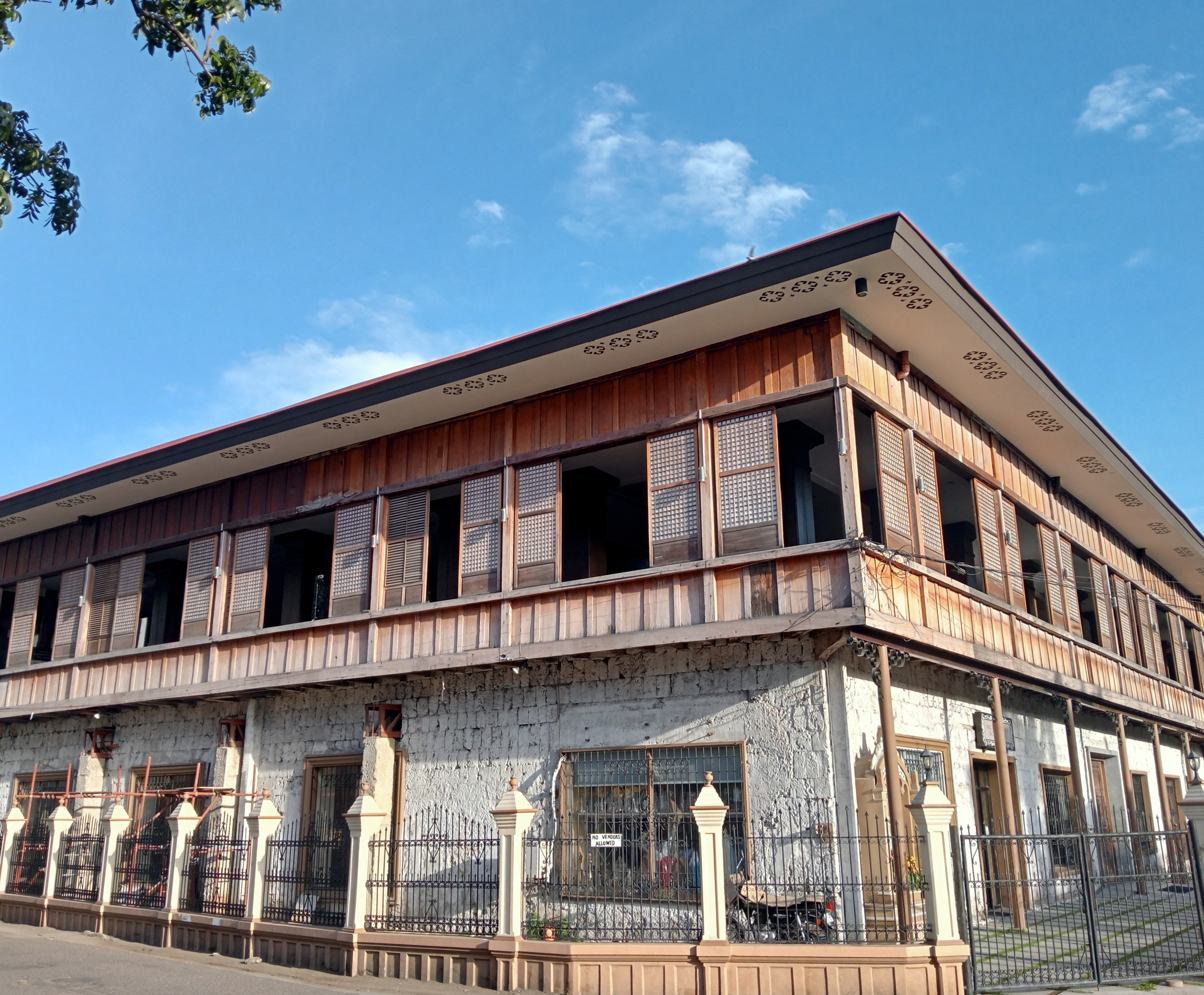
The Archdiocesan Museum of Cebu

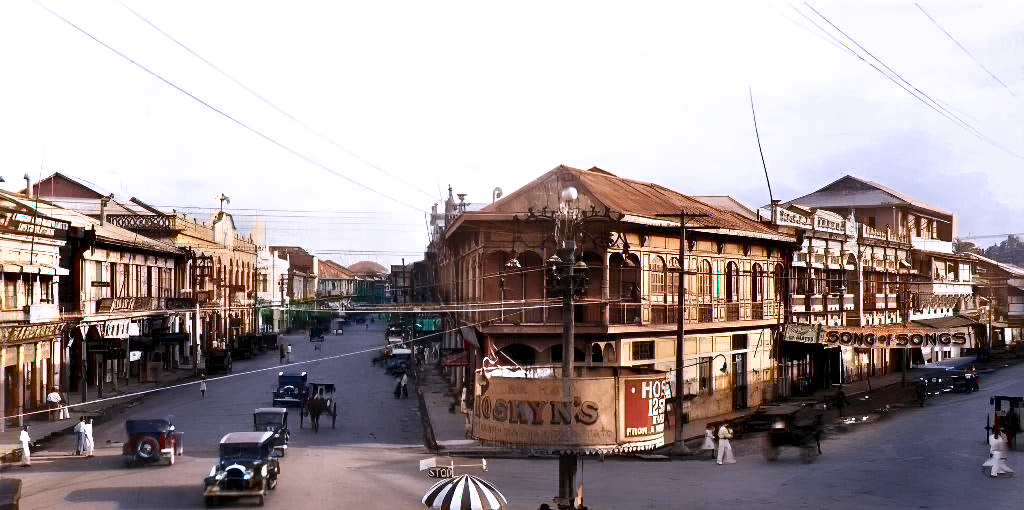
Old Calle Real, Iloilo

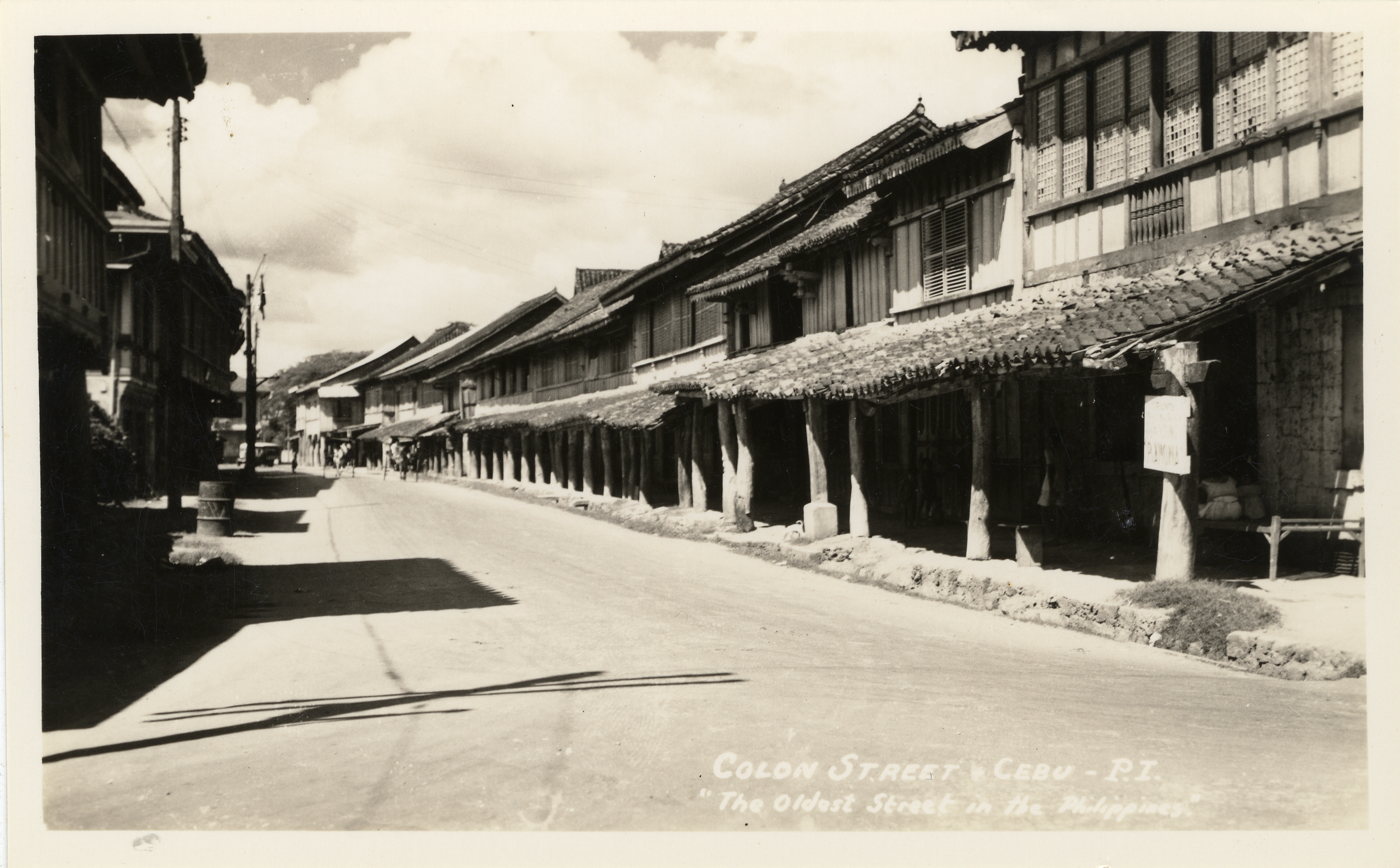
Old Colon Street, Cebu city

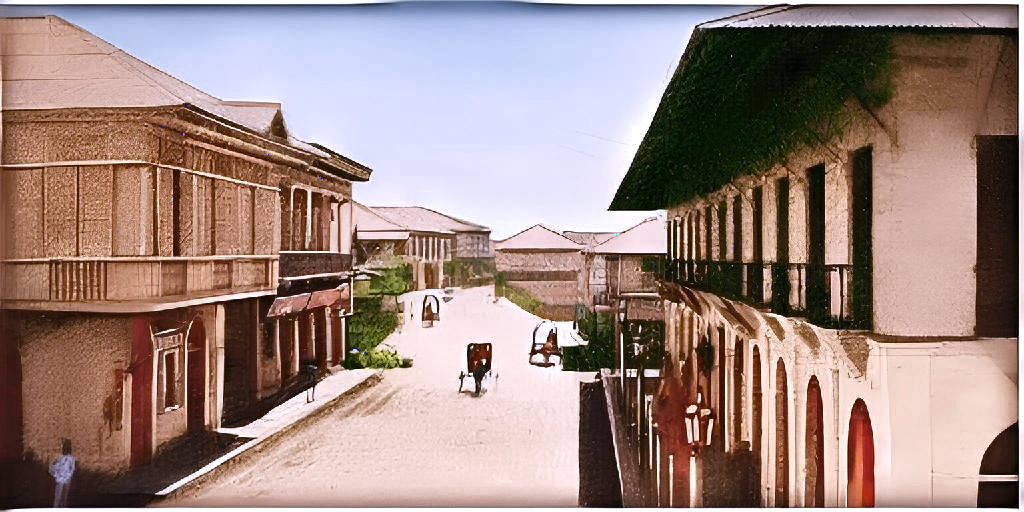
Old Iloilo city

==== Batanes ====
The Ivatan people of Batanes have a very different style of bahay na bato. As the islands of Batanes were absorbed by the colonial Philippines much later through Spanish conquest, their bahay na bato developed much later as well. Structures combined the pre-colonial Ivatan-style (presumably the jin-jin) and colonial Filipino-style bahay na bato, particularly the northern style from Ilocos and Cagayan, but with the use of thick limestone blocks instead of the bricks traditionally used in the northern mainland. In addition, structures incorporated practical methods suitable to their unique environment prone to destructive typhoons. Their variant styles include the common sinadumparan, which is similar to the mainland bahay na bato, having storage areas below and living quarters above. However, the storage floor is partially underground, acting as a basement, and the first floor serves as living quarters, appearing as a one-story house. The rakuh style, however, upholds the mainland tradition of having the first floor as storage and the second floor as living quarters, appearing as a two-storey house. The mainland bahay na bato influence is very much clear in the rakuh building.

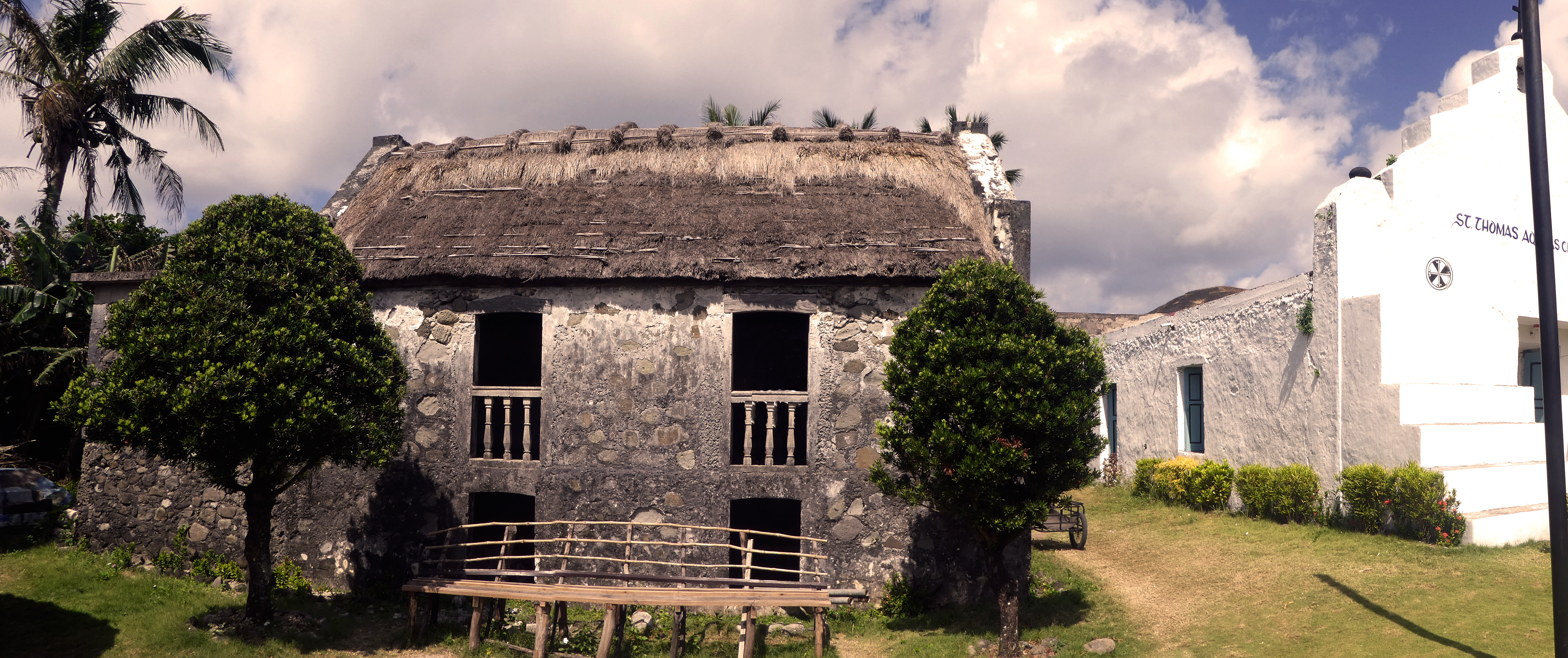
Rakuh

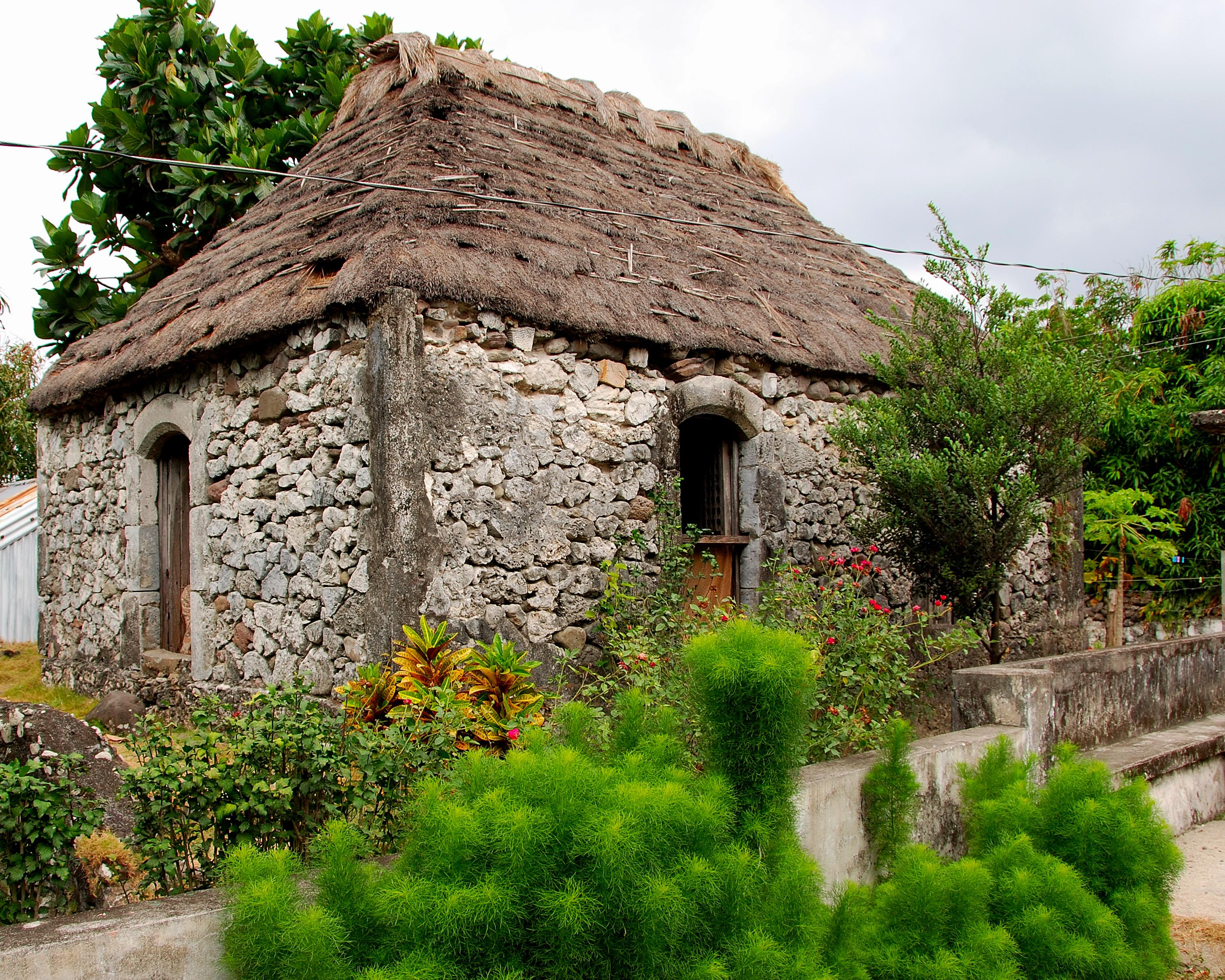
Sinadumparan

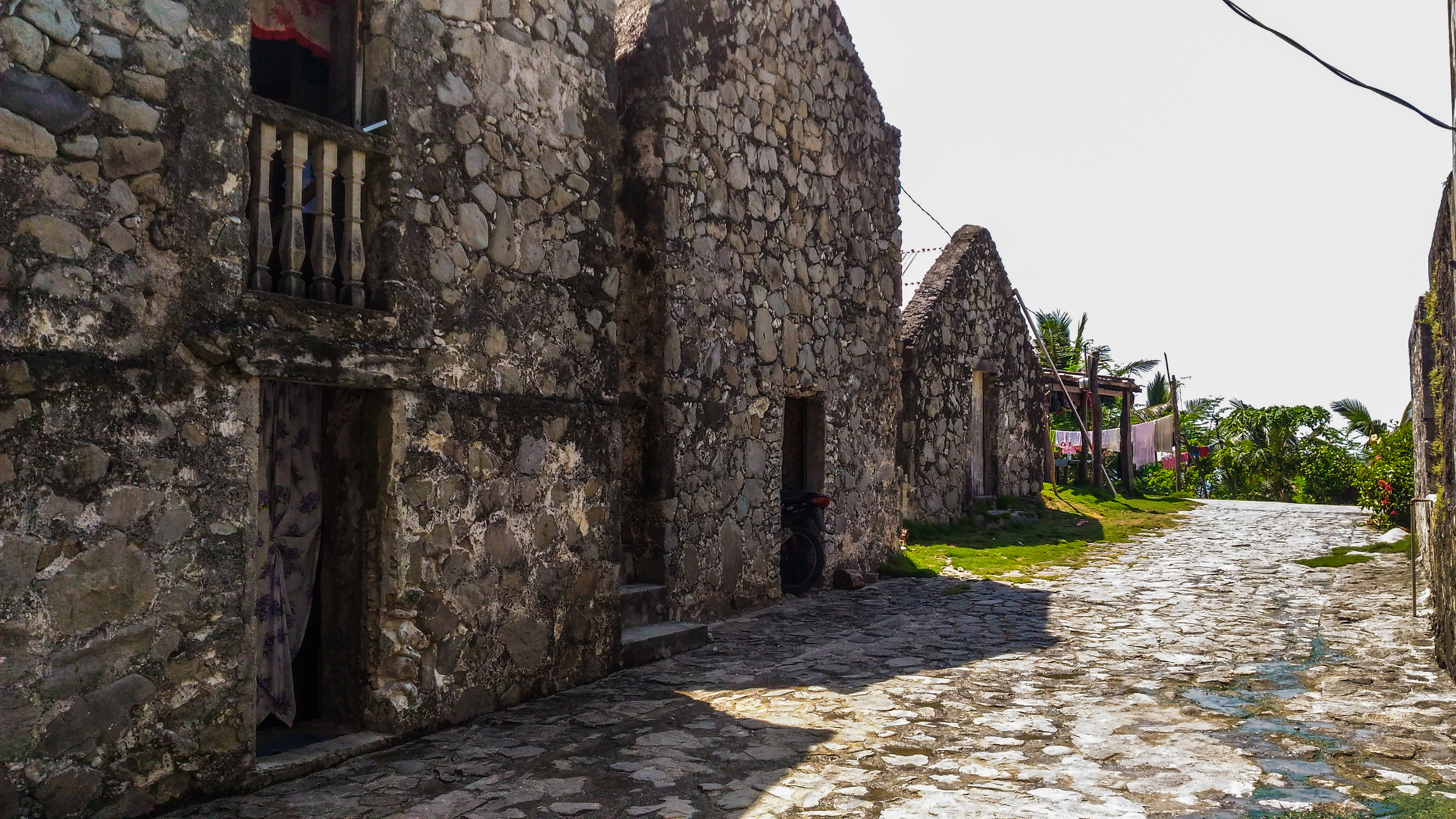
Batanes street

== Other buildings ==
Many convents, monasteries, schools, hospitals, offices, stations, etc. also adapted the bahay kubo architecture to the Spanish colonial style. As a result, many of these buildings ended up as bahay na bato as well.

Examples of such buildings include the University of Santo Tomas (Intramuros), Colegio de Santa Rosa Manila campus, San Juan de Dios Educational Foundation, Tutuban station, AMOSUP hospital, Hotel de Oriente in Binondo, Malacañang Palace, and many other church convents which are still standing today.

Examples:

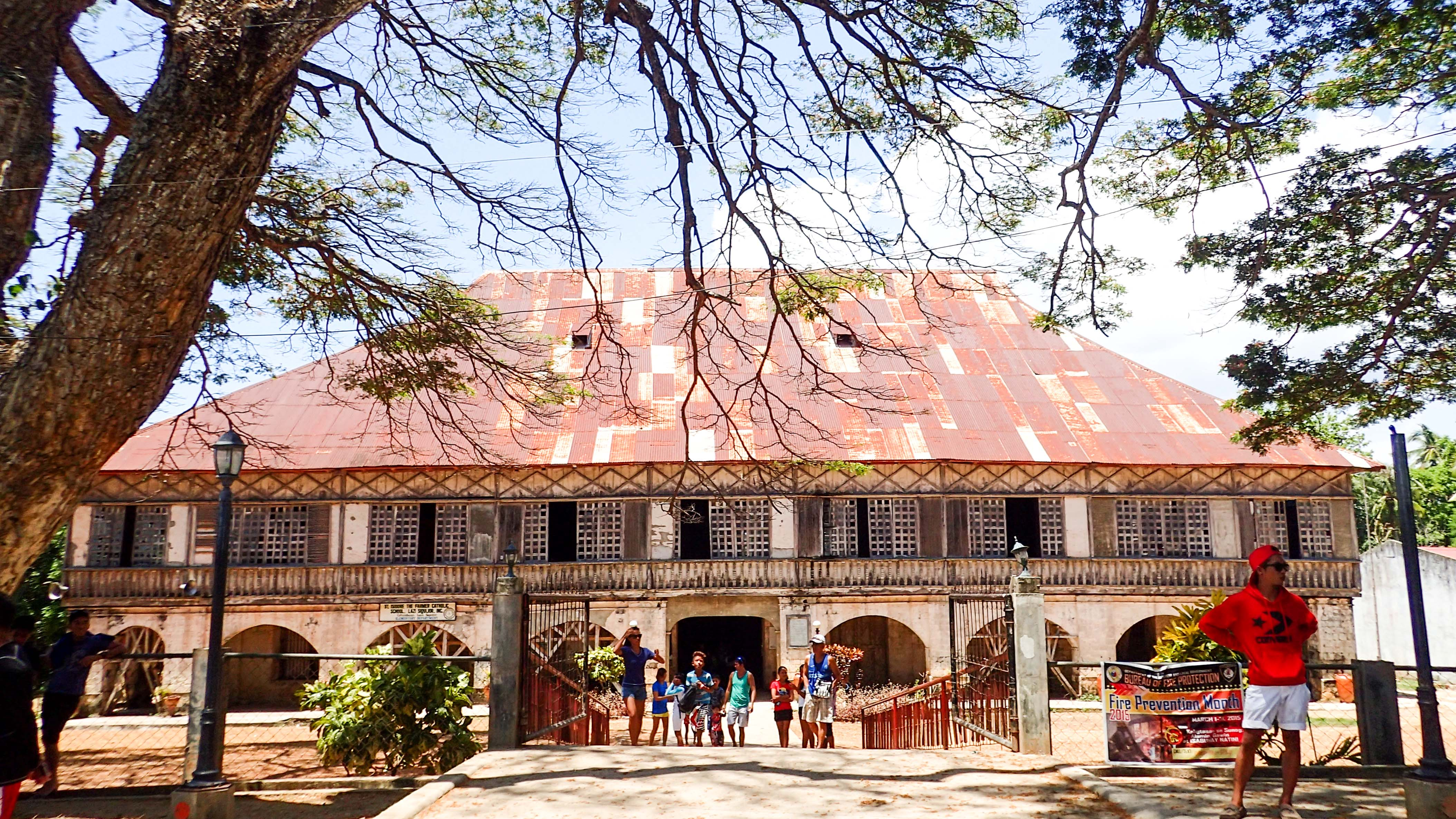
Lazi Convent

Malacañang Palace

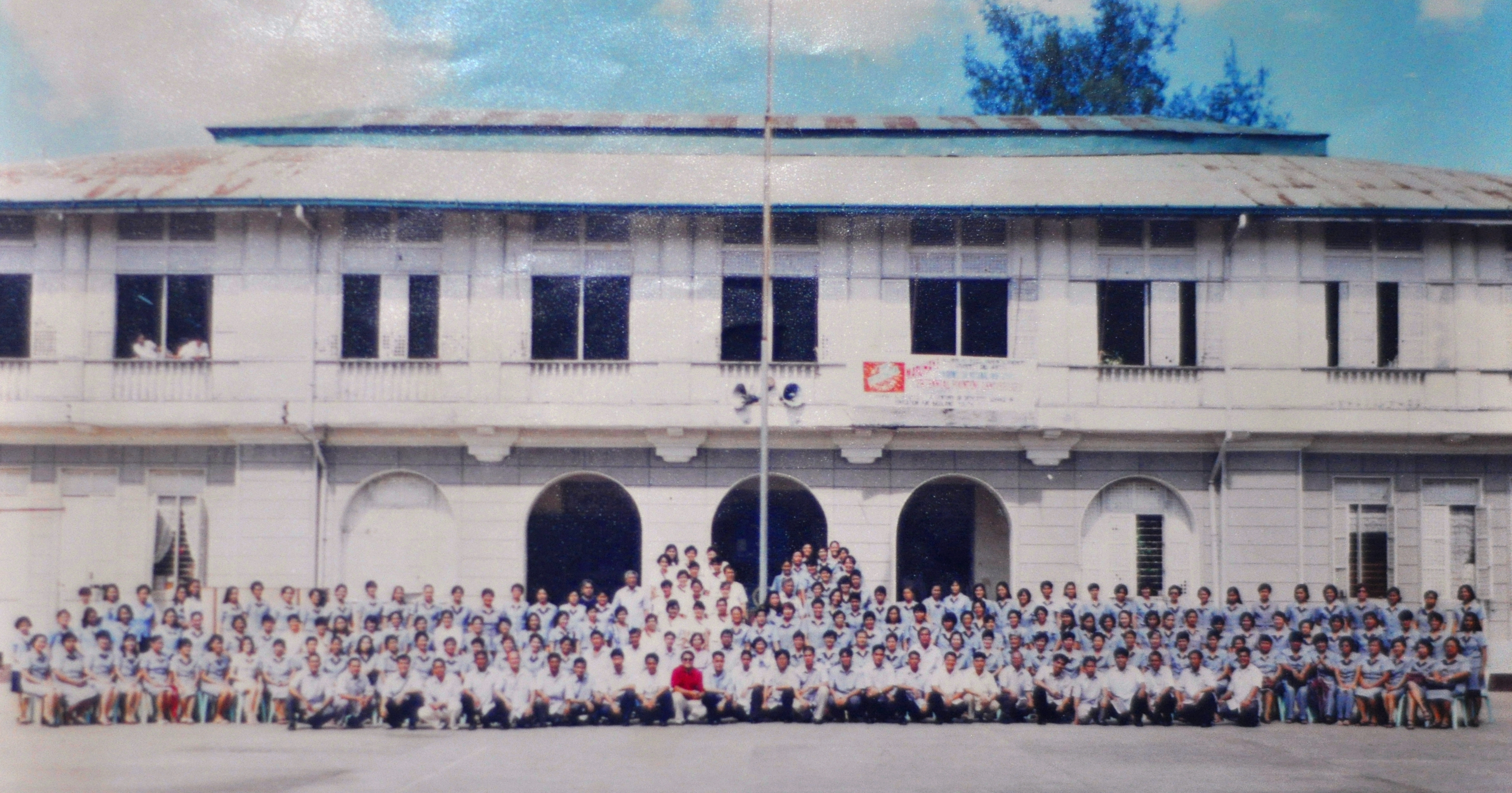
Camarines Sur National High School

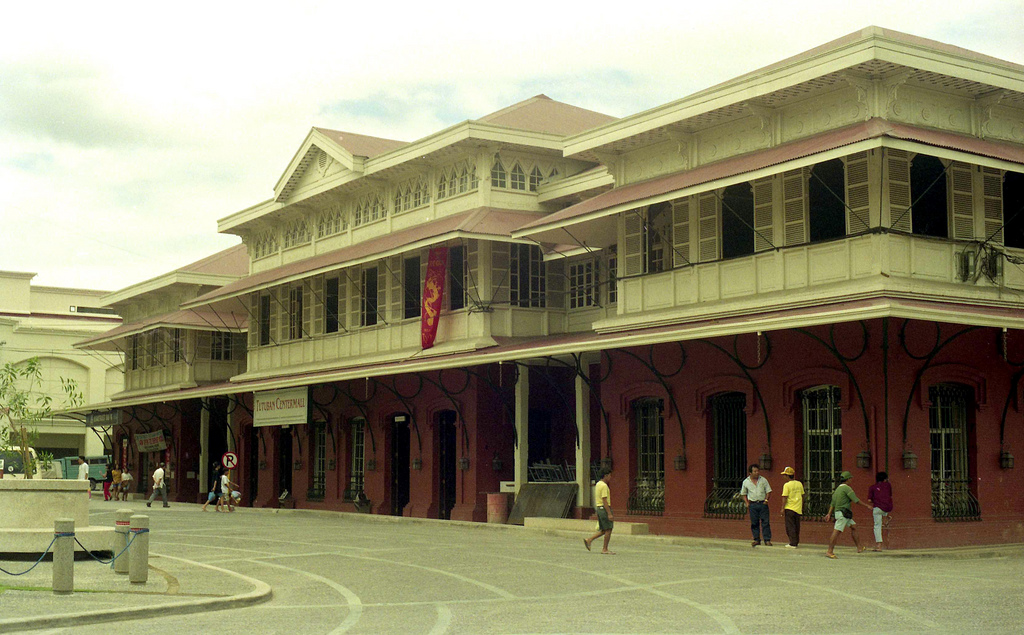
Tutuban station, 1890s

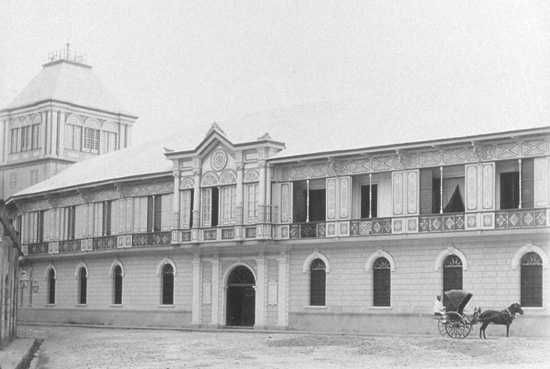
San Juan de Letran 1800s

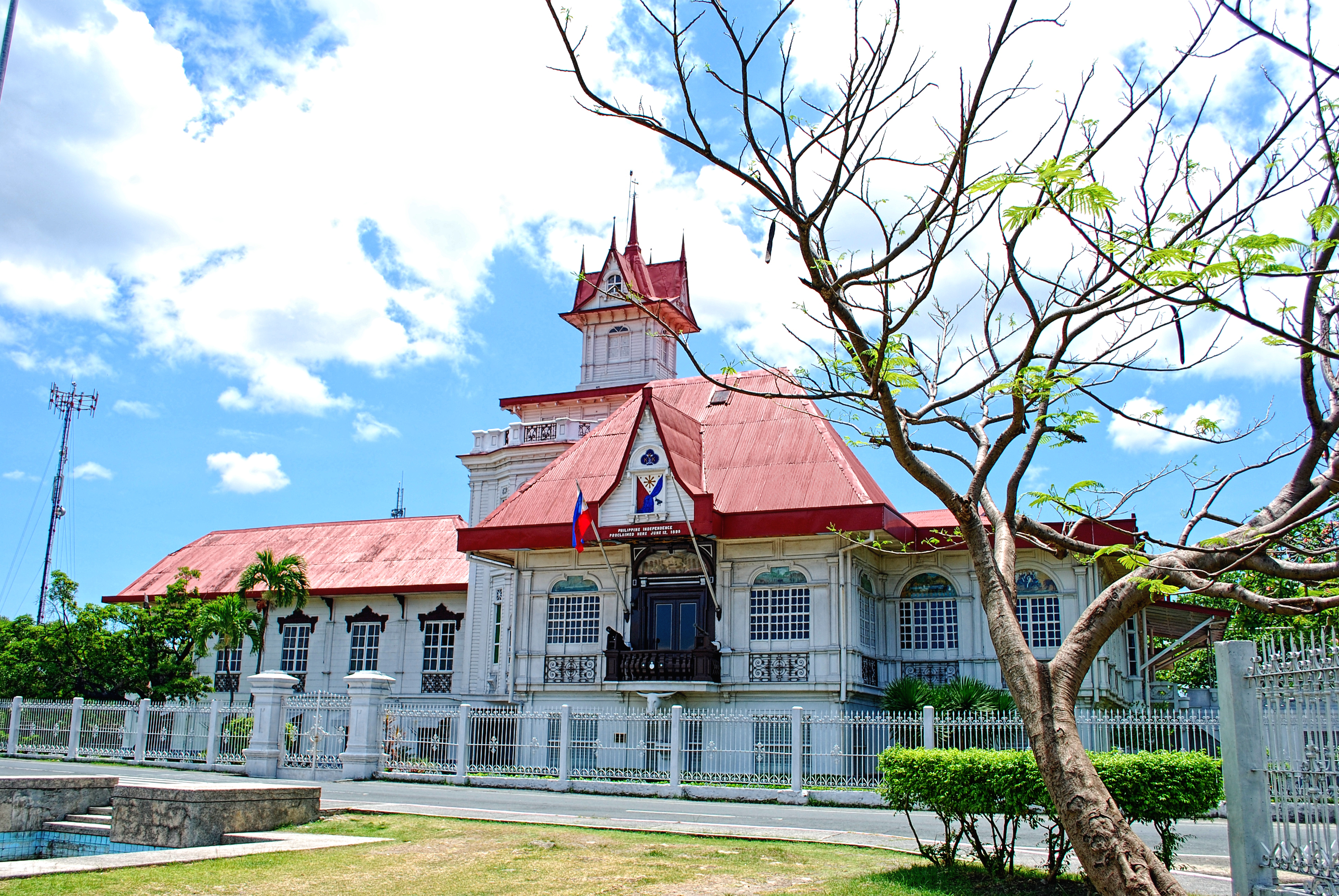
Aguinaldo Shrine

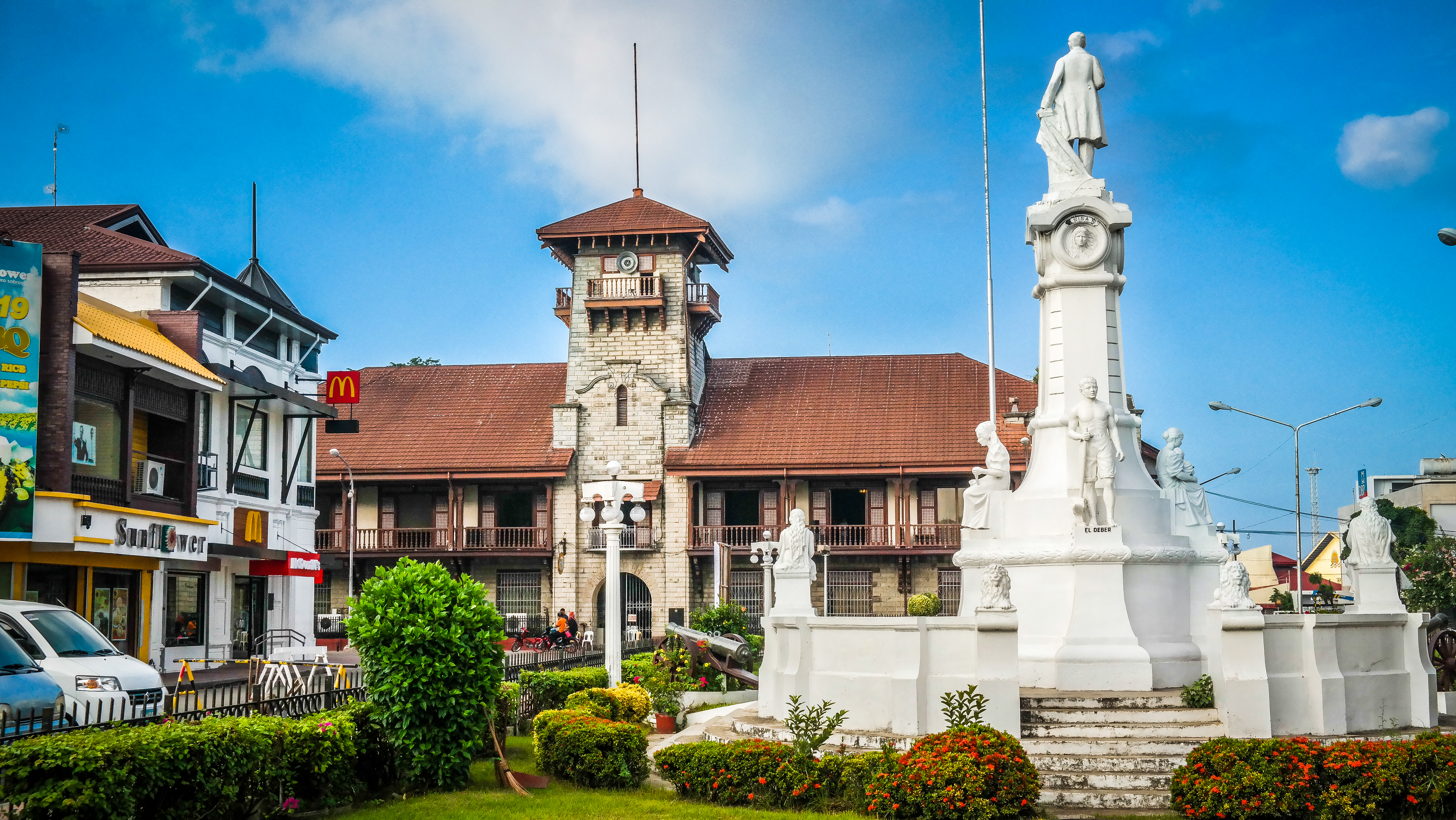
Zamboanga City Hall

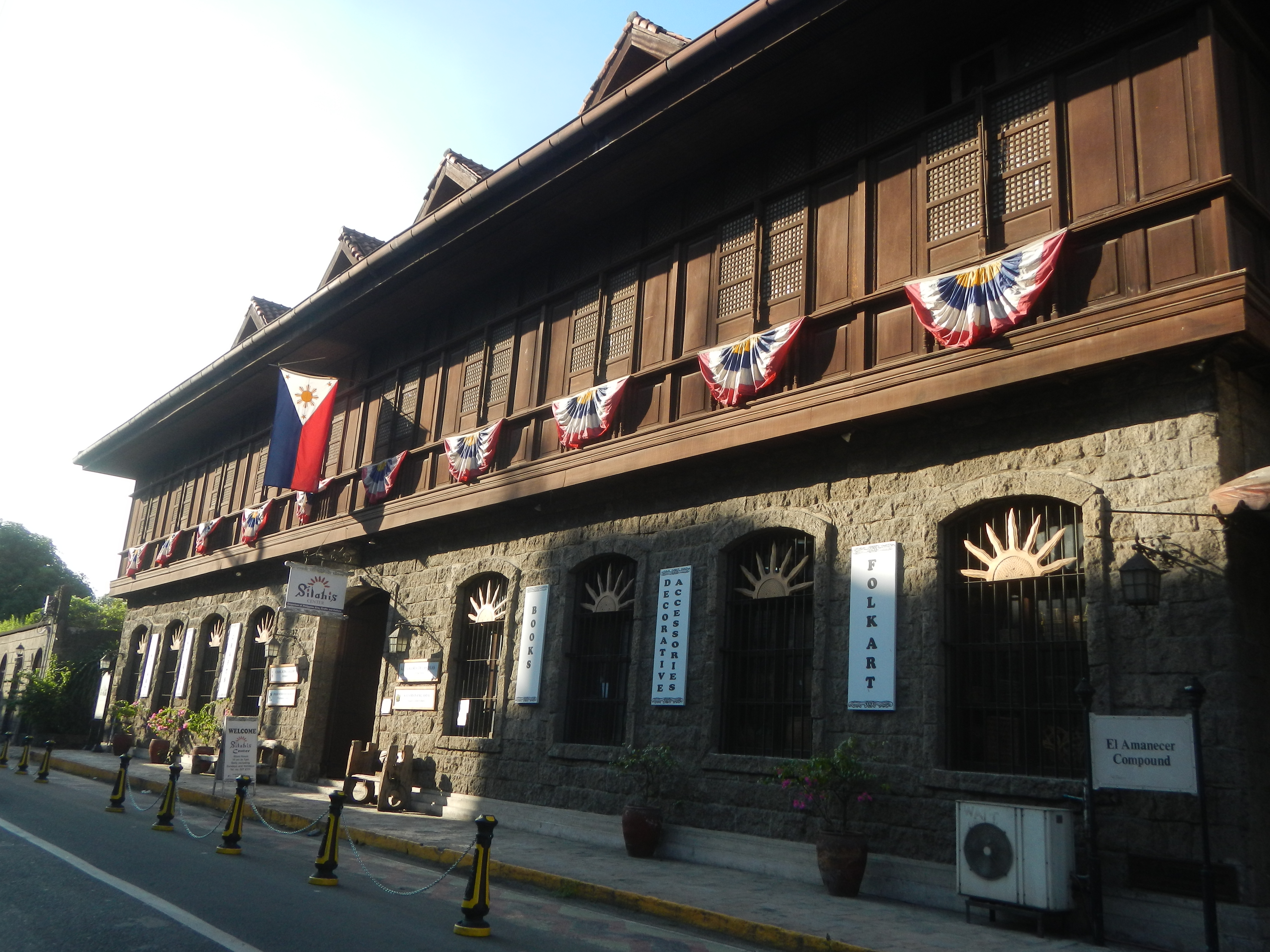
El Amanecer Building

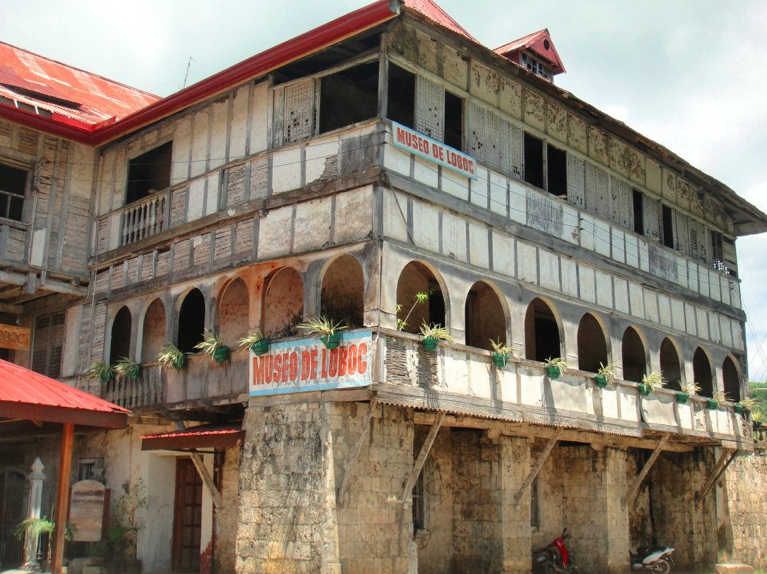
Museo de Loboc/Convent

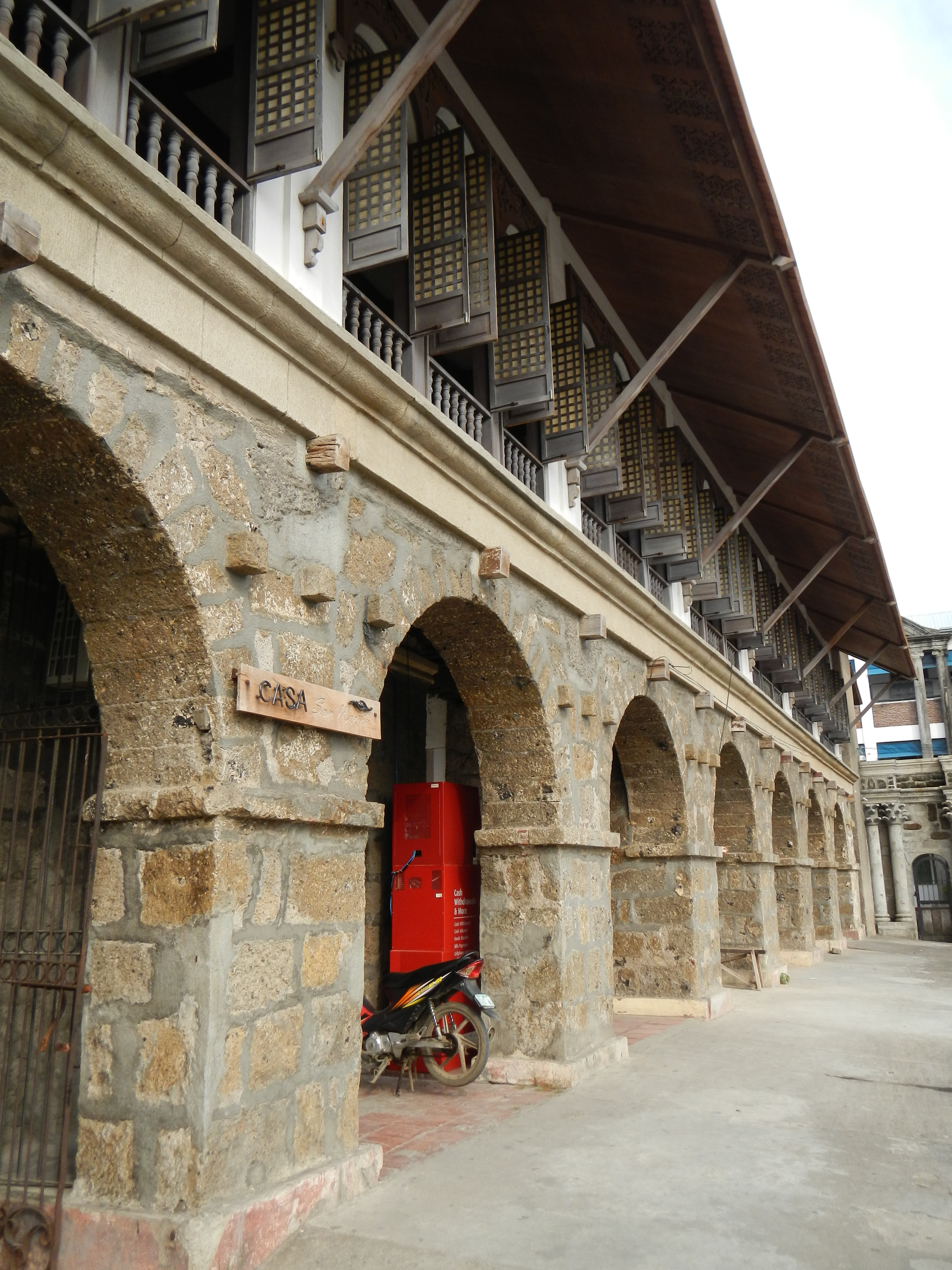
Taal, Batangas convent

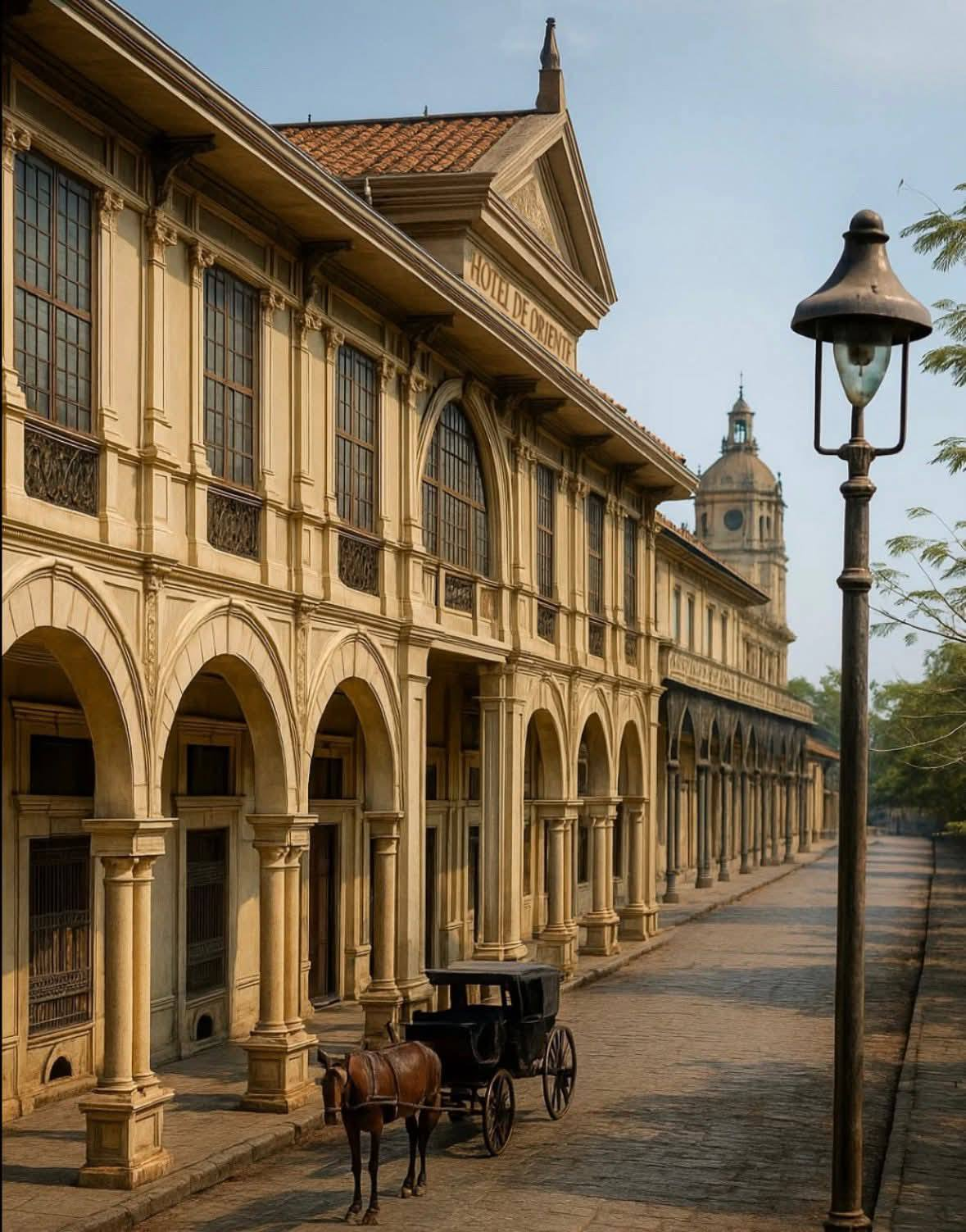
Pre-World War 2 Hotel de Oriente

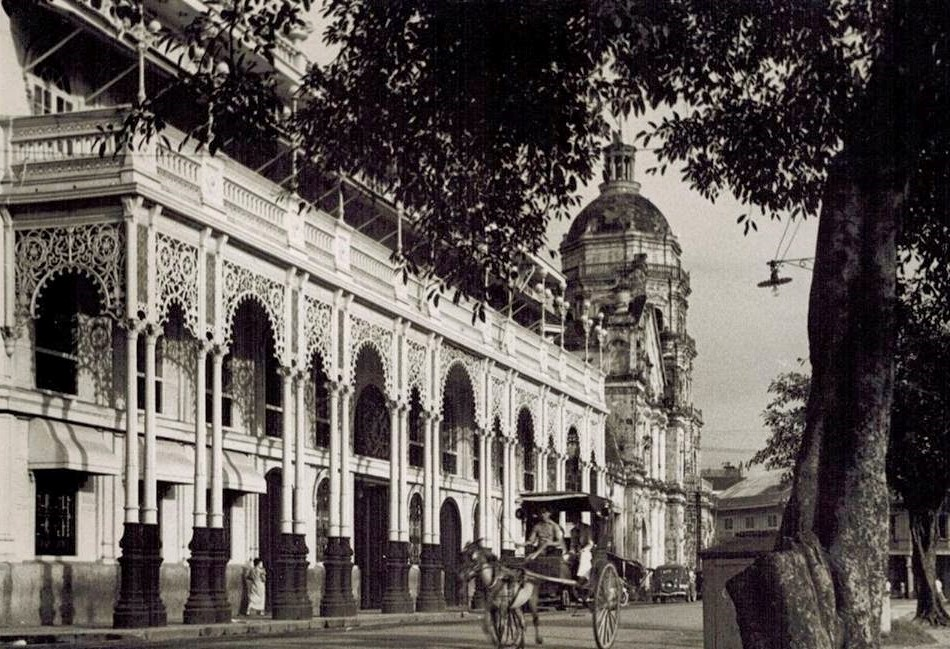
La Insular Cigar Factory

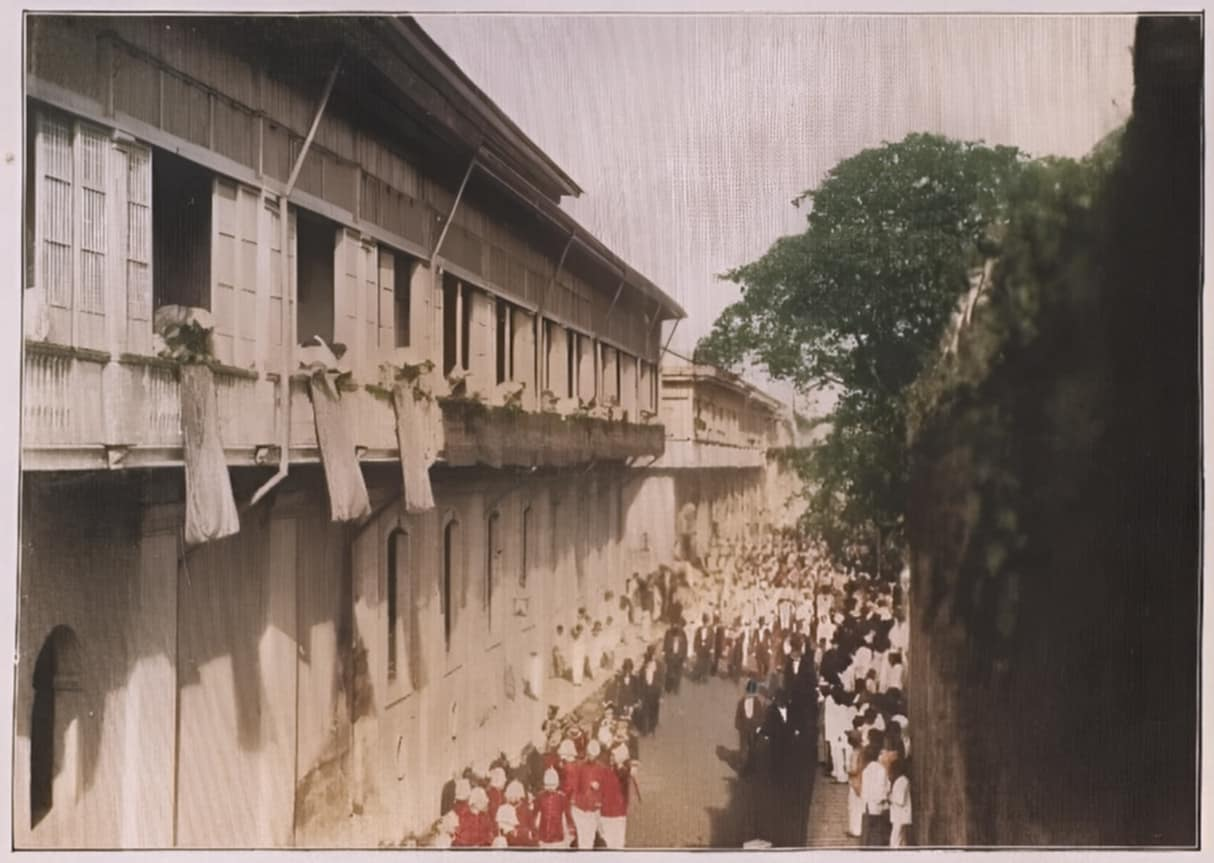
College of Santa Isabel, Manila, Philippines

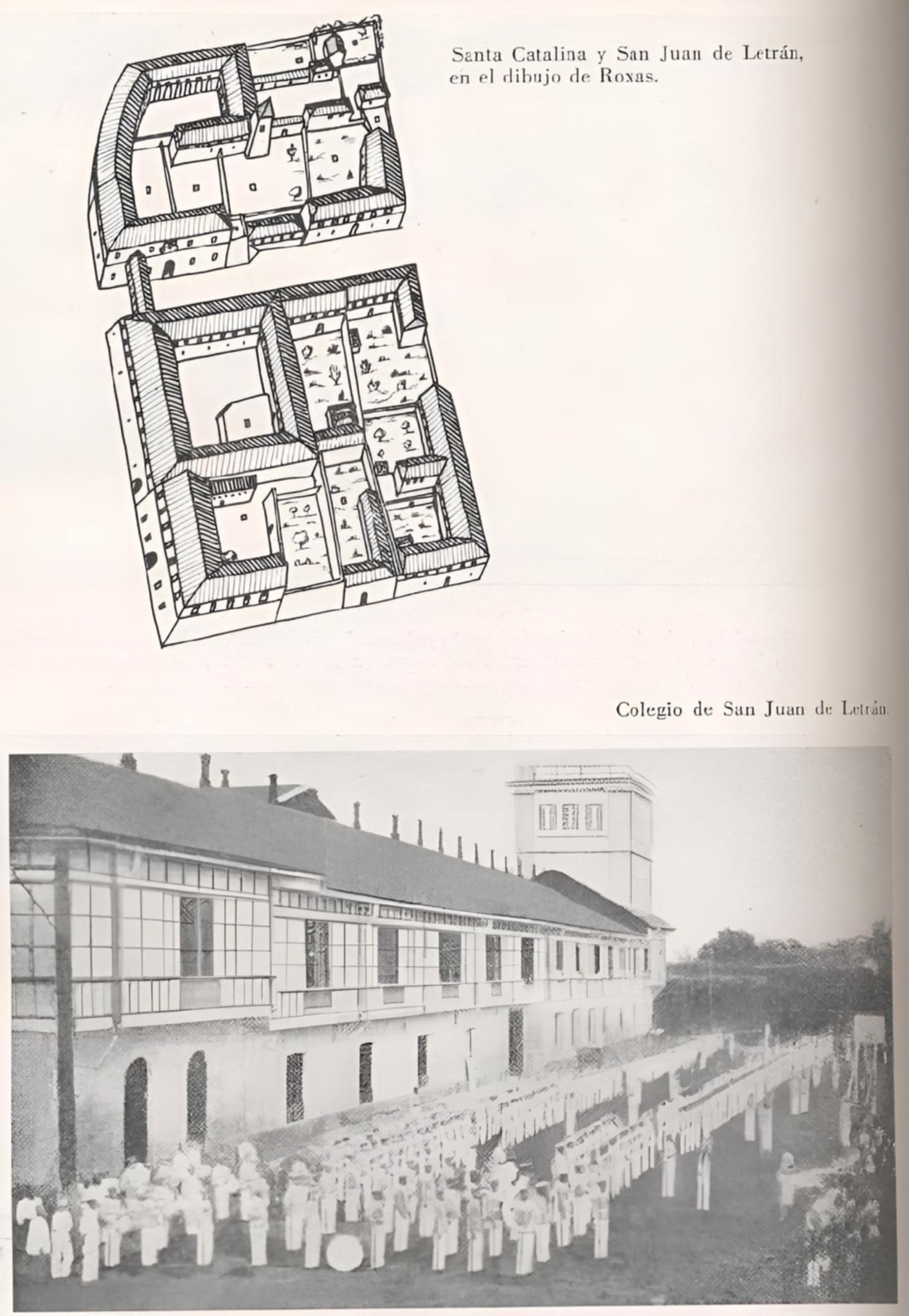
Santa catalina and Letran Manila Philippines

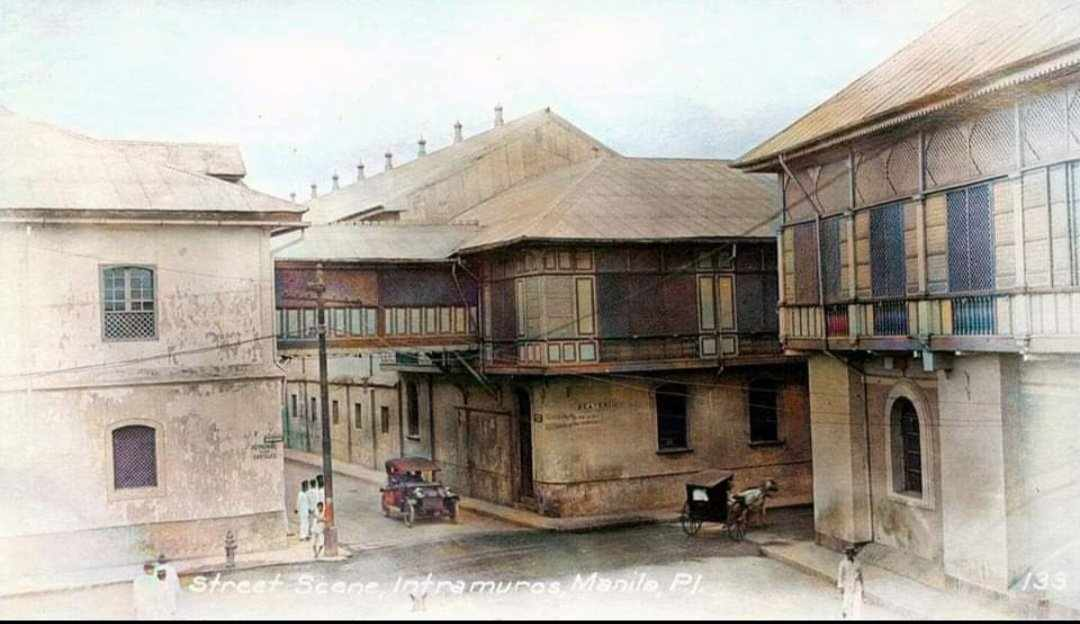
Intramuros Edifices

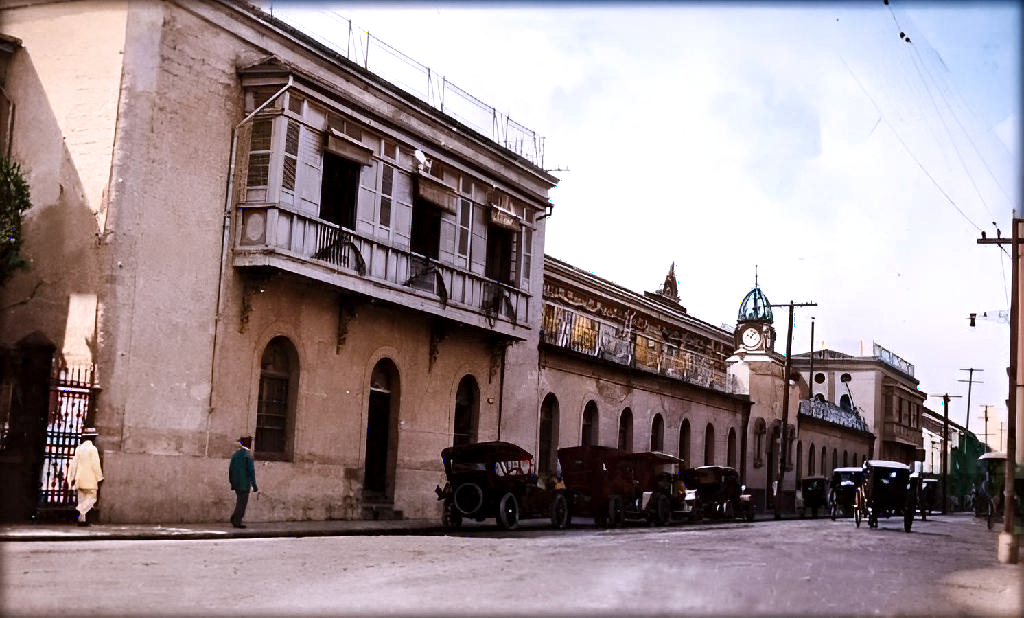
Hospital of San Juan de Dios Intramuros Manila Philippines 1900's

== Bahay na Bato in the Intramuros Register of Styles ==
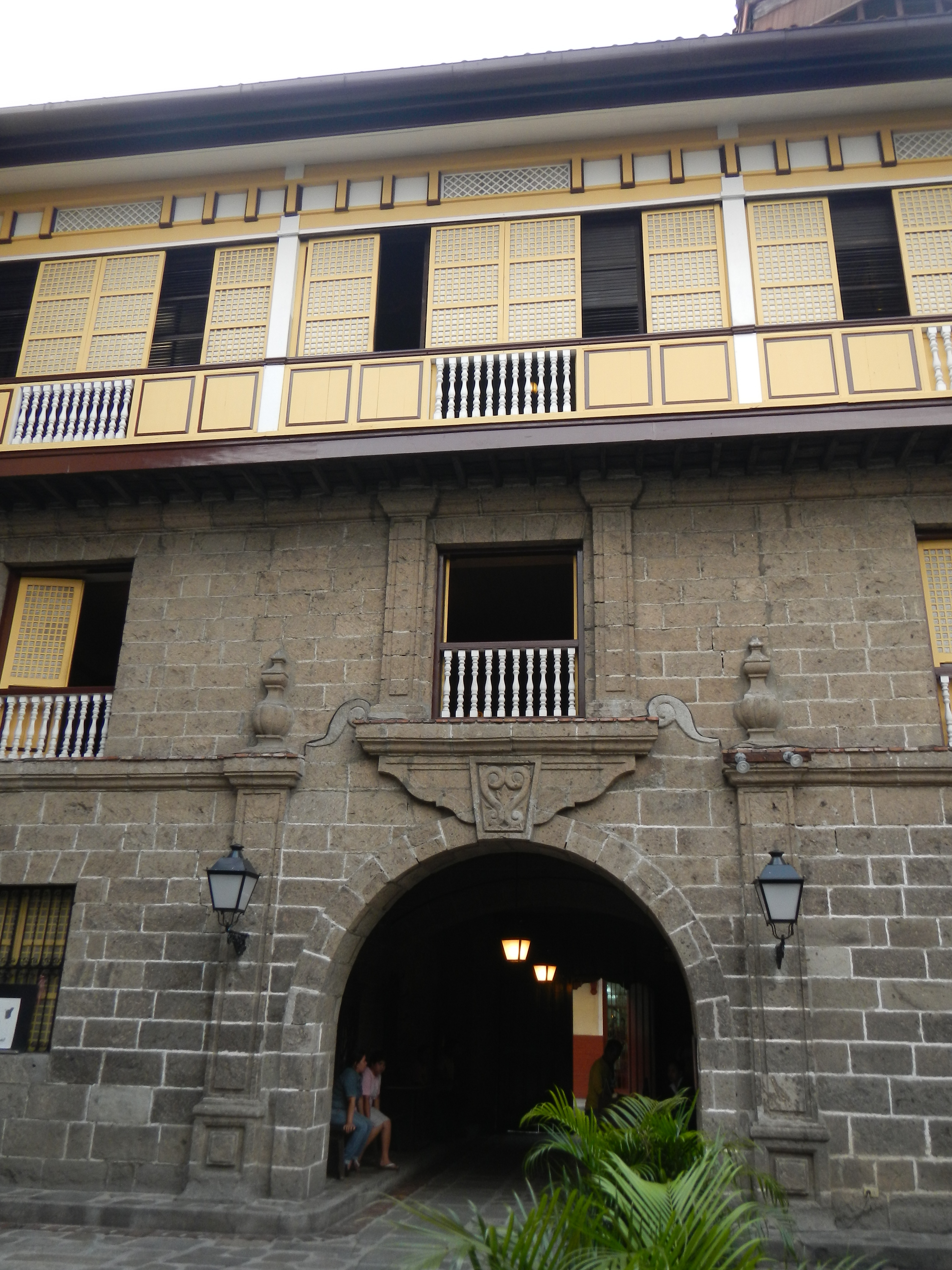
One of the few reconstructed authentic houses in Intramuros is the houses in Plaza San Luis Complex.

The Intramuros Register of Styles is the main architectural code of Intramuros, the historic core of the City of Manila, Philippines. The Register of Styles prescribes the Bahay na Bato as the default style for new constructions in Intramuros.

The Register became part of Presidential Decree No. 1616, as amended, when it was gazetted by the Official Gazette of the Philippines on June 17, 2022. The Intramuros Administration is the agency of the Philippine Government responsible for the implementation of the Register of Styles.

Intramuros in Manila is the only locality in the Philippines where, for cultural reasons, the use, height, scale, and aesthetics of all new constructions and development are pre-determined and strictly regulated under the force of national law. The Register of Styles, as an integral part of Presidential Decree No. 1616, is the main legal document prescribing and guiding the implementation of pre-war architectural colonial styles in Intramuros.

The Register of Styles is the first document to detail the historical styles of Intramuros. It was authored by Rancho Arcilla, who was then the Archivist of the Intramural Administration, and under the initiative of Guiller Asido, the former Administrator of Intramuros.

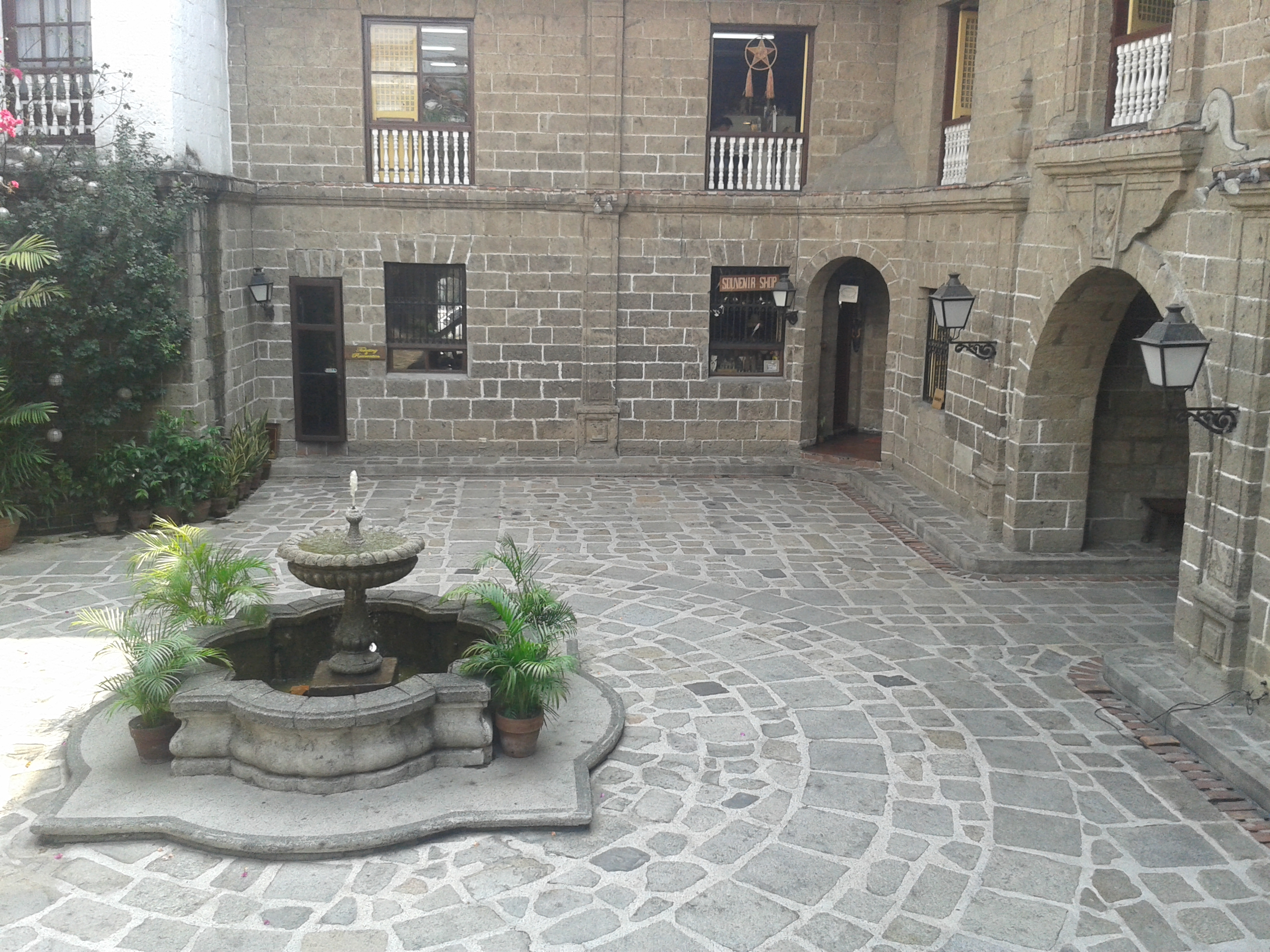
Plaza San Luis complex courtyard

By form, the urban landscape of Intramuros mostly lacked setbacks, with buildings that were mostly terraced (rowhouses). Courtyards or backyards were exceptionally well adapted to the climate. The Intramuros style was described as both vernacular and cosmopolitan. While its Church and State buildings were European in orientation, albeit adapted and localized, most of the buildings were enclaved within its walls and embraced tropical vernacular constructions as exemplified by the Bahay na Bato. Churches, fortifications, and palaces fashioned in European styles, though few, became icons and objects of popular imagination. In contrast, the vernacular Bahay na Bato, which was adopted in majority of buildings, prevailed in terms of number of constructions. Except in certain instances, the Register of Styles prescribes tha\e Bahay na bato as the default style for new constructions in Intramuros.

== Parts of a bahay na bato ==
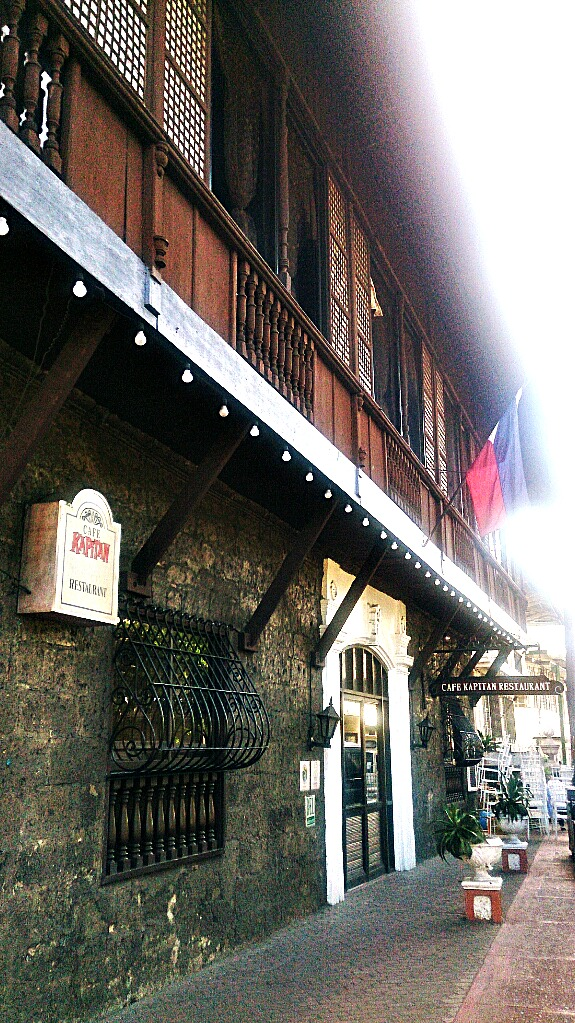
Facade with volada, ventanilla and capiz window

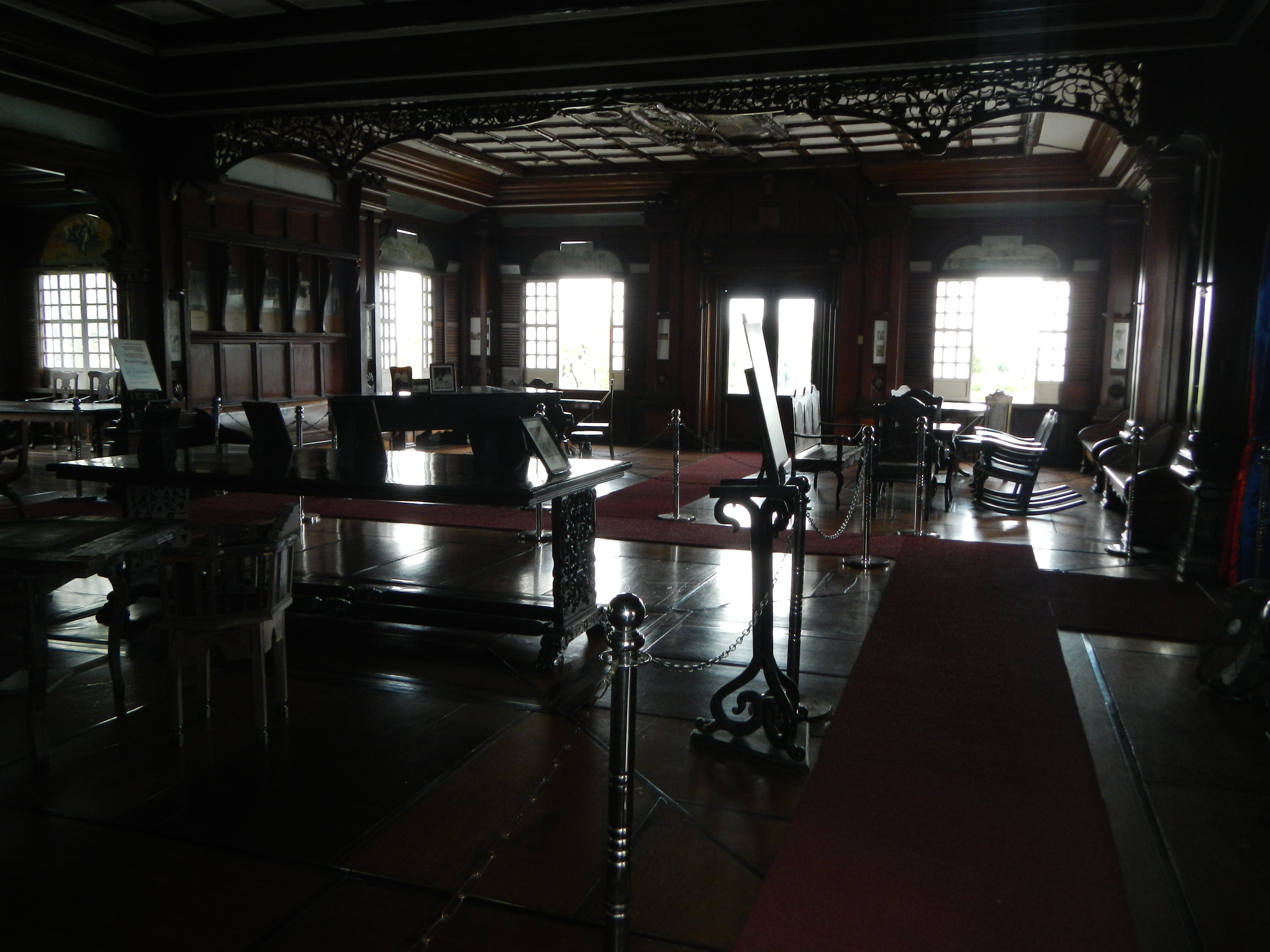
Bahay na Bato interior

As with any vernacular architecture, different features of bahay na bato vary from building to building, many of which was from Classical principles that was employed to refined the proportion, syntax and detailings. Houses may have or lack certain elements from the following list:

- Accessoria – Apartment-type dwelling characterized by common party walls shared by adjoining units with a separate door in front of each
- Aljibe – Cistern
- Anta
- Antesala – Caida
- Aparador de tres lunas – Armoire with three sections
- Arko – Arch
- Azotea – Open-air balcony beside the kitchen that housed a cistern (aljibe) and the bathroom, and was usually a work area
- Atlas, atlantes – A column, pilaster and other decorative features in the shape of a man
- Balconaje, Balcon – Balcony
- Banggera – A wooden dish rack that extends outside the kitchen window. After the dishes are washed, they are placed here to be air-dried. The inverted cups are placed on the ends of the wooden sticks and the plates are placed in between or above the slats. On the far left is a tapayan/banga, an earthenware jar that keeps water cool
- Bañera – Bathtub
- Baño – Bathroom
- Barandillas – railing or balustrade (usually wooden)
- Barrigones – "Buntis" (or bombere, pregnant) grillwork on windows, to accommodate planters
- Batalan – The rear part of the house used for washing and water storage, with a flooring often made of slatted bamboo; more a part of a bahay kubo (but may be present as well at the rear of a bahay na bato)
- Baul mond – Traveling trunk
- 'Bentwood beech chairs and other furniture – Imported dark wood furniture
- Brackets – Series of often diagonal braces placed in support of the volada on the second floor
- Butaka – A version of silla perezosa with no leg rests
- Caida – Landing on the upper entrance hall; foyer of the second floor; also called "antesala"
- Calado – Lace-style fretwork or latticework used to adorn room dividers and to allow air to circulate
- Capilla – Long bench, a staple item in the caida
- Capital – Topmost member of a column (or pilaster) mediating between the column and the load
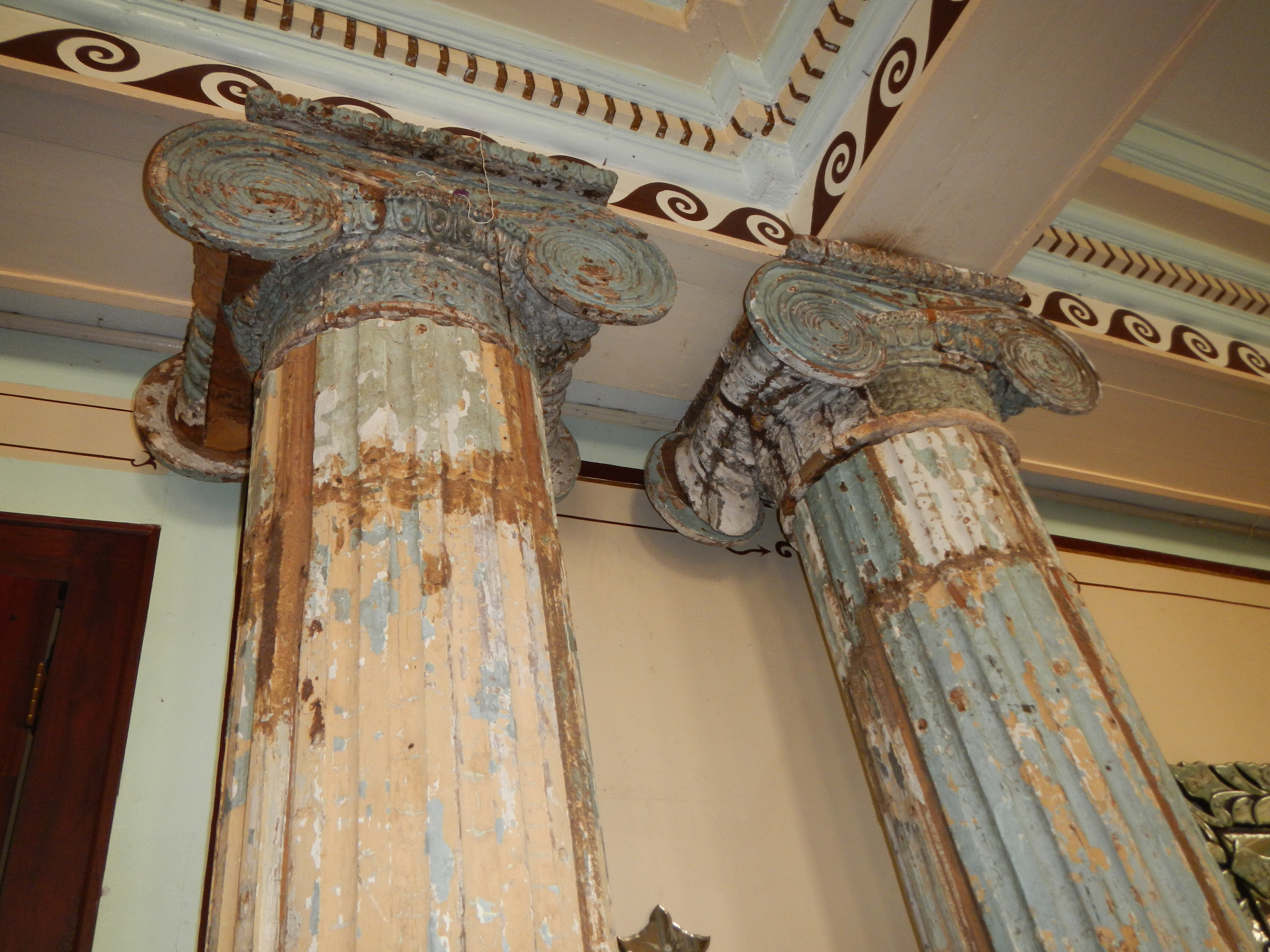
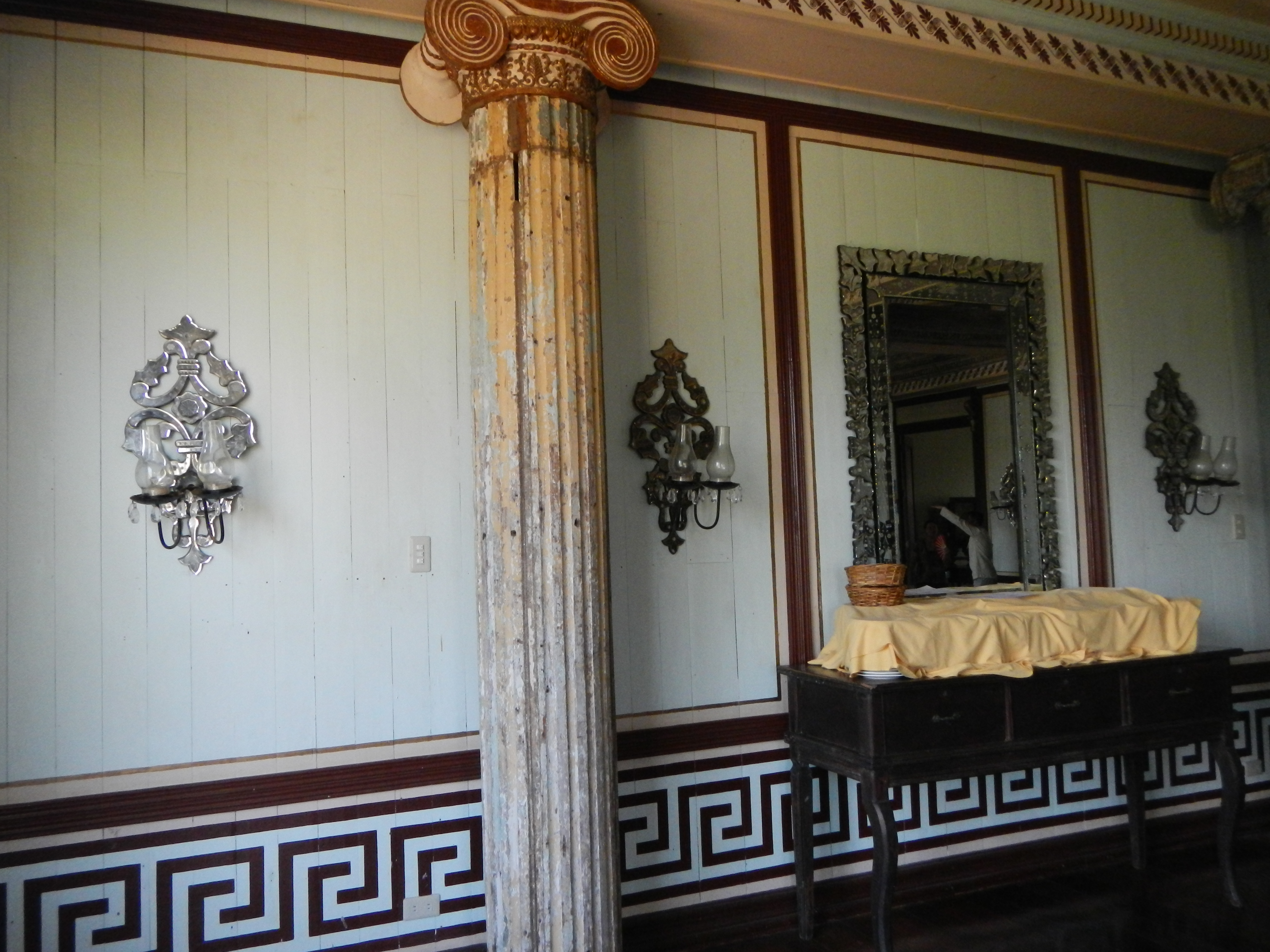
  Ionic columns
- Capiz windows – Typically sliding windows made with capiz shells cut into squares
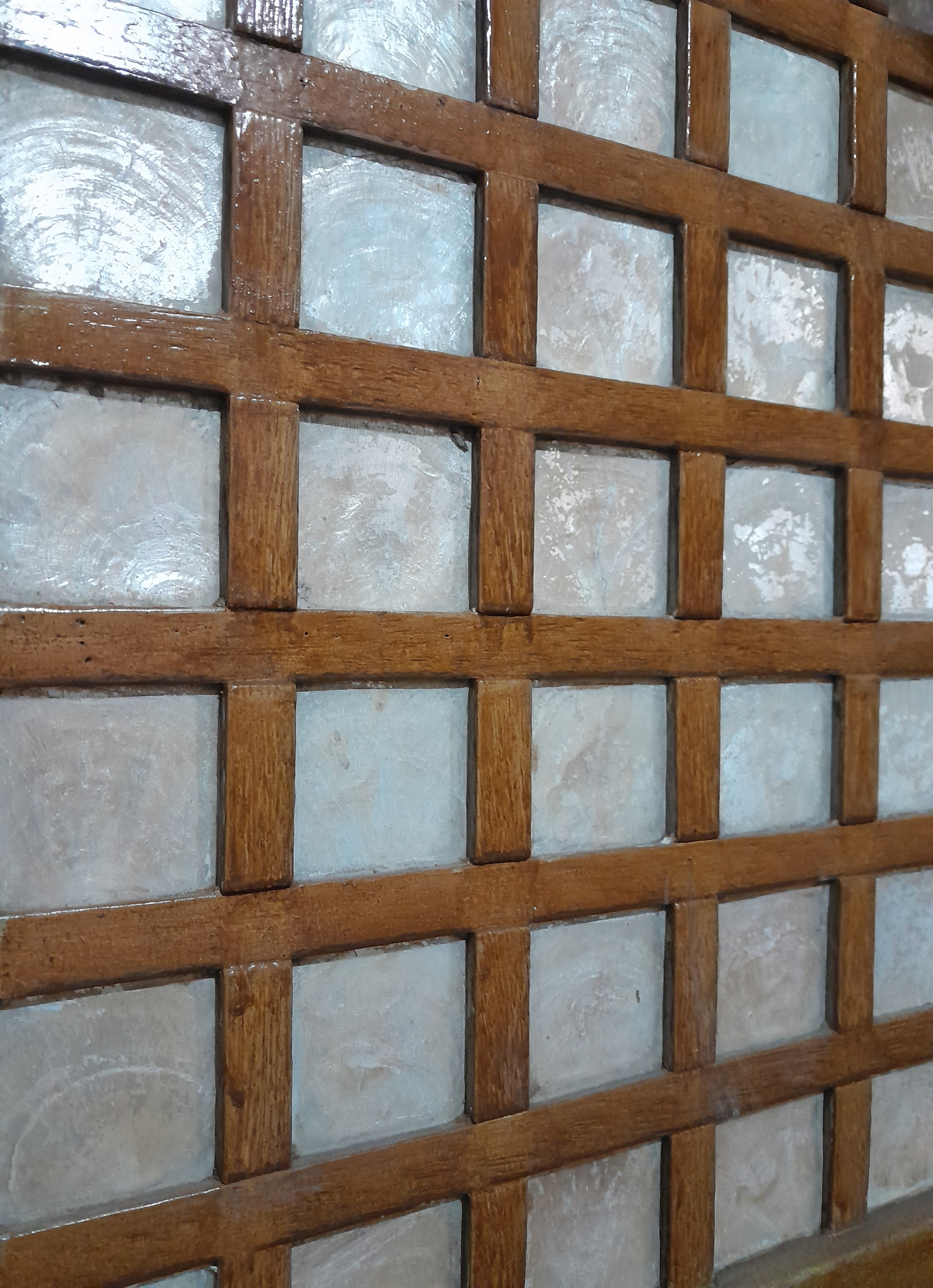
  capiz-shell window panel

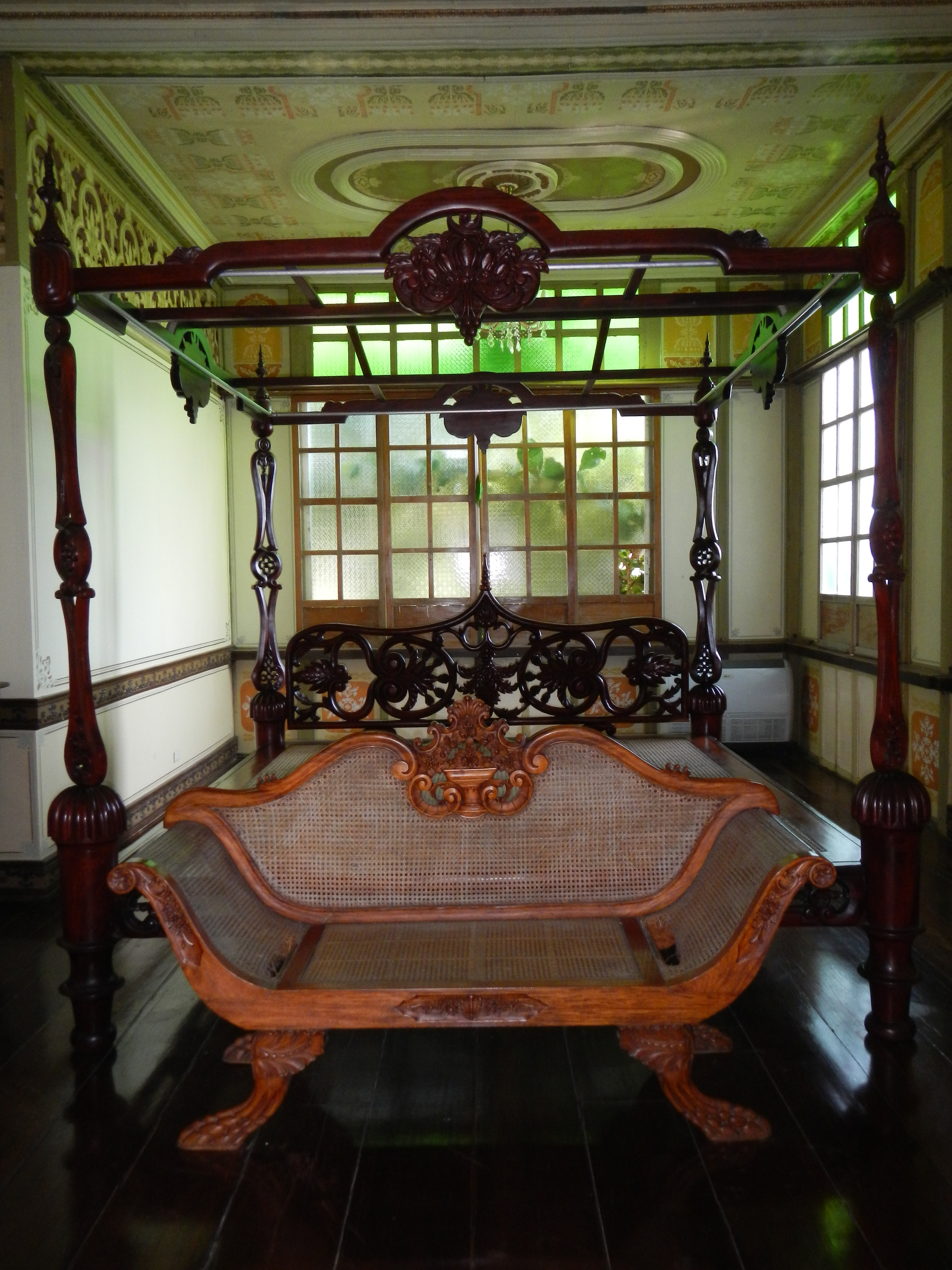
kama or Bed

- Caryatid – A sculpted female figure serving as an architectural support taking the place of a Pilaster, column or a pillar etc. supporting an entablature on her head
- Clerestory – Any high windows above eye level to bring outside light, fresh air, or both into the inner space
- Cocina – Kitchen, which was typically built separately from the house
- Colonette – A small, thin decorative column supporting a beam (horizontal timber) or lintel (beam spanning a door or window)
- Comedor – Dining room
- Comun – Toilet; also called "latrina"
- Corbel – A projection jutting out from a wall to support a structure above it; also "braces"
- Cornice – A ledge or generally any horizontal decorative moulding that crowns a building or furniture element
- Court, courtyard – A space enclosed by walls and is open to the sky; has a balcony
- Cuartos – Rooms
- Cuatro aguas – Hip roof, which has more corners and angles, making it stronger than the dos aguas (gable) or high-pitched roof due to stronger aerodynamics (i.e., more wind resistance); also has the advantage of providing an overhang, which is effective for protecting the house from rainwater and from direct sunlight
- Dapugan – A platform in the kitchen where the kalan or clay stove is placed
- Despacho – Office; also "oficina"
- Dispensa – Pantry
- Dos aguas – Gable or high-pitched roof
- Eave – Bottom edge of a roof
- Engaged column – Column in support of the roof above

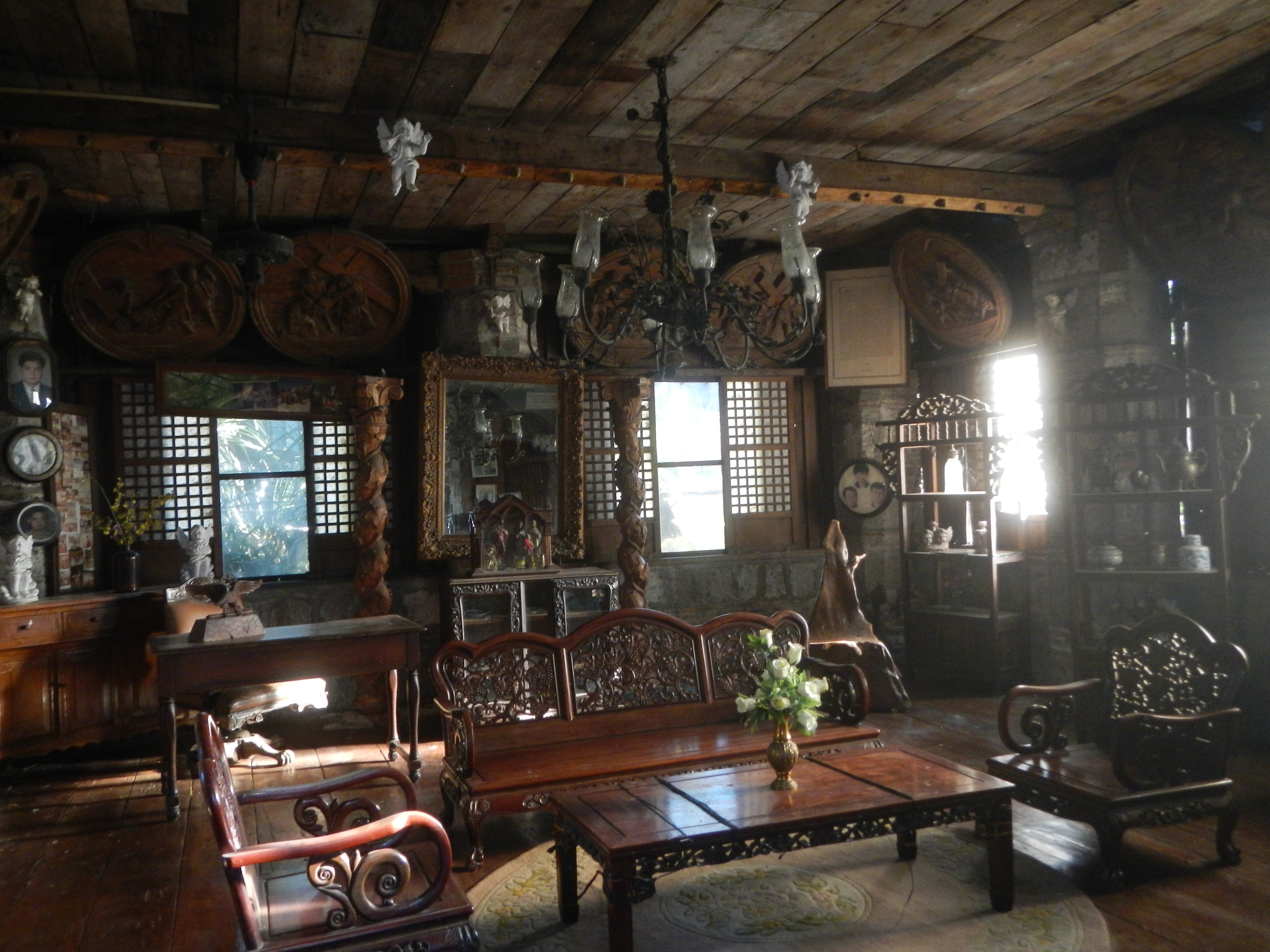
Casa Oleta Pililla, with noticeable Solomonic column furnitures. Rizal Ancestral house interior.

- Entresuelo – Mezzanine; literally meaning "between floors", this is the area where clients, tenants or estate managers (if the owner was a rich landowner) wait before being admitted to the oficina (office)
- Escalera – Stairway
- Escritorio – A large chest of drawers, commonly adorned with inlay work
- Estante – Dining room cabinet where chinaware and silverware are displayed
- Facade – Front
- Finial – A usually foliated ornament forming an upper extremity
- Fresquera – Storage room for salted food, etc.; placed on the wall of the house facing outside
- Gable – The part of a wall that encloses the end of a pitched roof
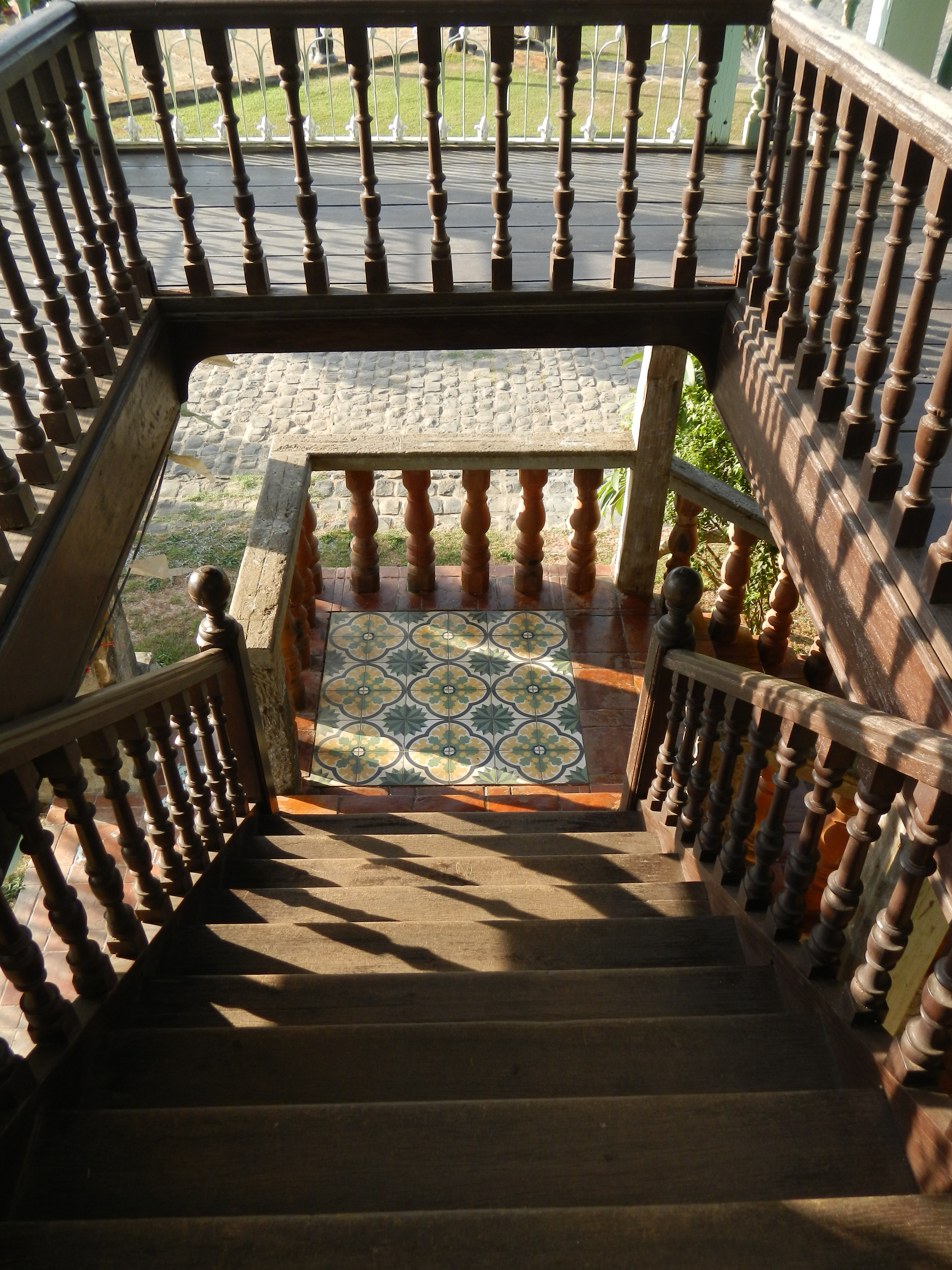
  Stair
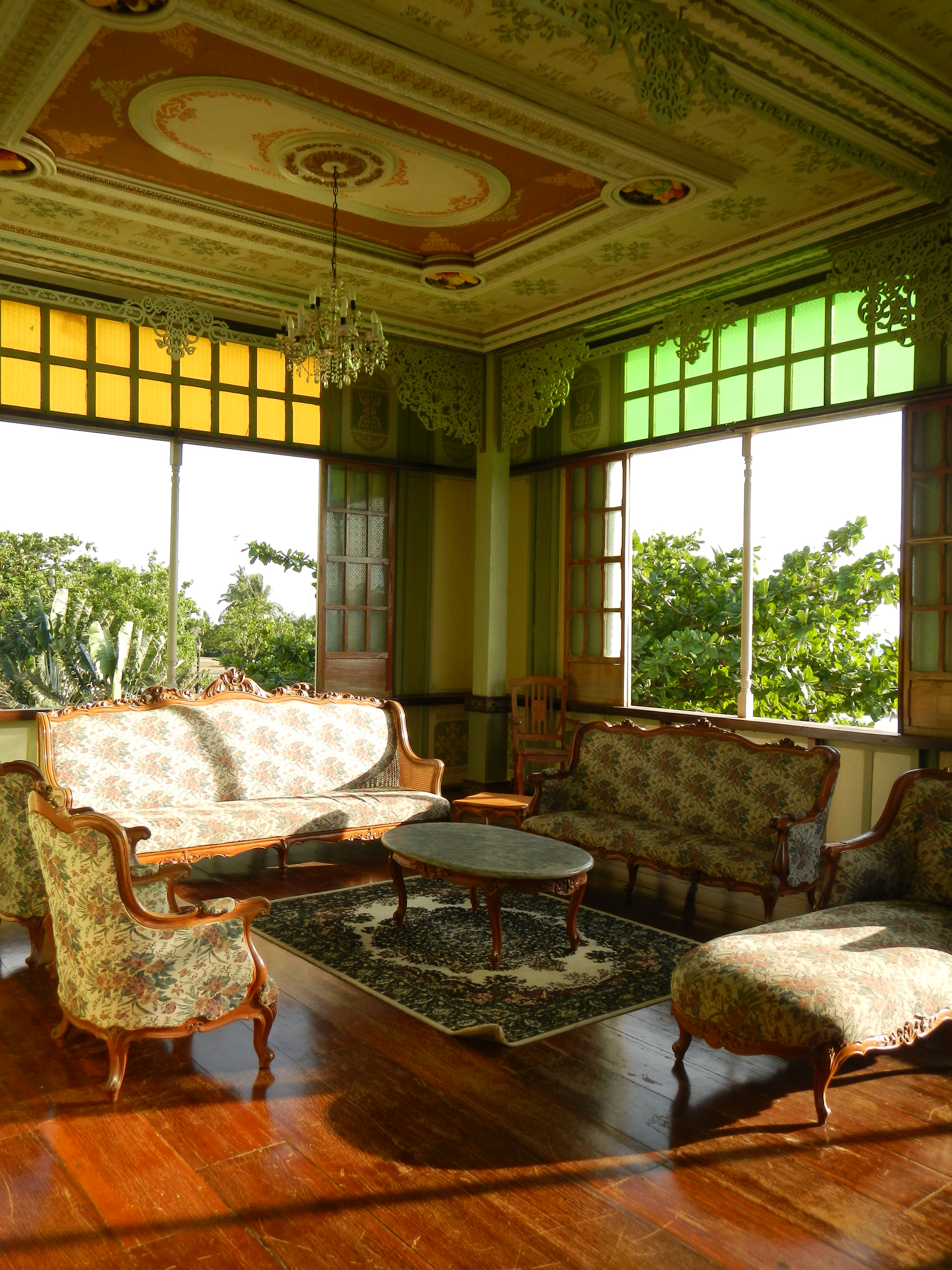
  Sala
- Gallinera – Literally, "chicken seat"; "usually found outside the oficina of a landowner; coming from the Spanish word 'gallo' (chicken), this church bench-inspired settee is used for farmers to place chickens on the cage underneath in exchange for paying cash" (Old Manila Nostalgia blog)
- Gargoyle – A carved stone grotesque with a spout designed to convey water from a roof and away from the side of a building, thereby preventing rainwater from running down masonry walls and eroding the mortar between
- Gingerbread trim, running trim – 19th-century Victorian style of fancifully cut and pierced frieze boards, scrolled brackets, sawn balusters, and braced arches, to transform simple frame cottages into one-of-a-kind homes; usually attached to the eaves to make it more decorative and to curving iron rods that help support the media agua
- Haligi - A wooden posts supporting the whole elevated structure.
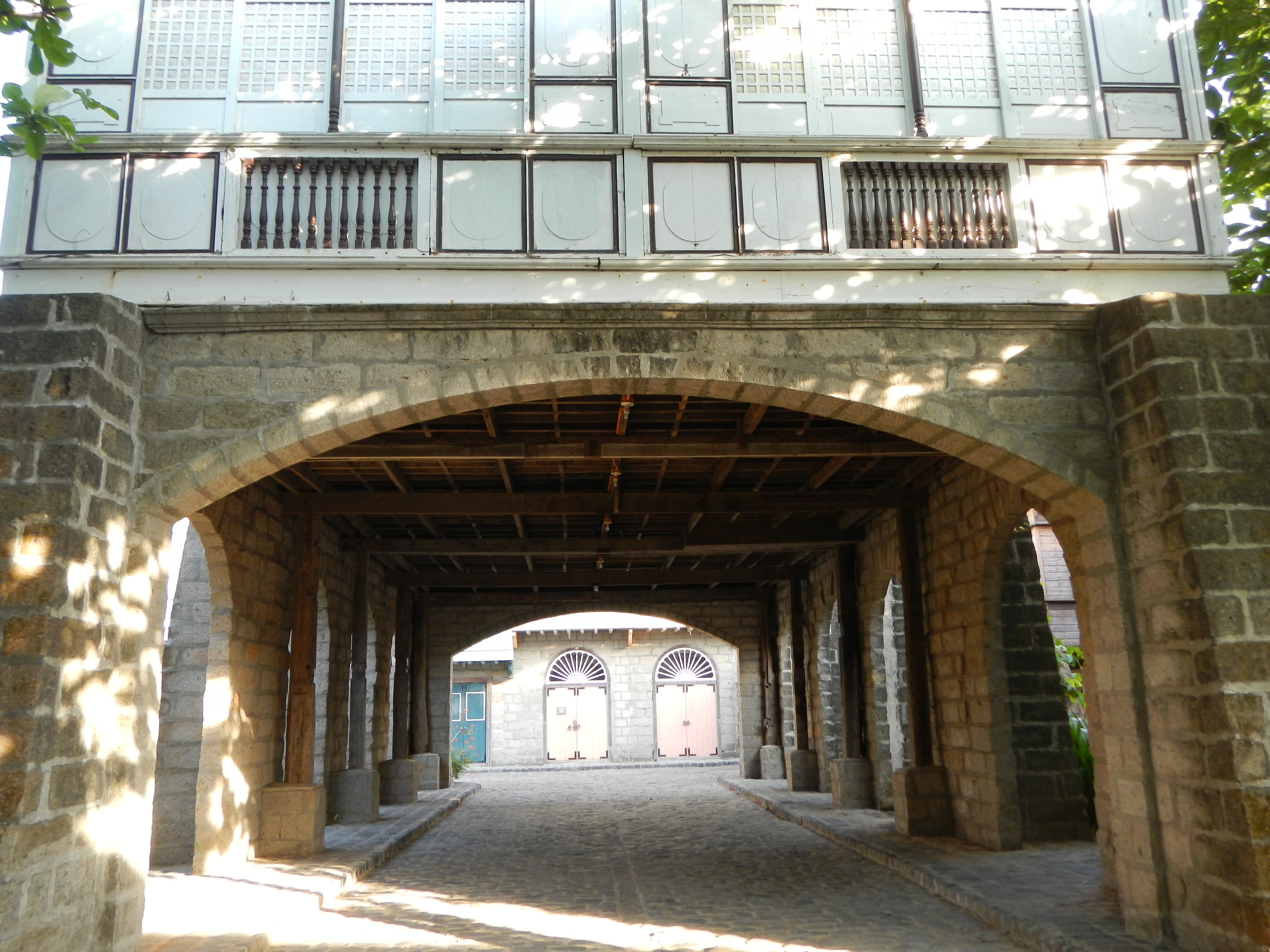
  Interior view of the ground floor wooden posts, being the true support frame of the elevated structure, a tradition from Bahay kubo. While the stone walls acts merely as a curtain cover.
- Kalaka (Philippine Spanish: calaca) - halved bamboo sections that are fitted together alternately (similar to clay tiles), used for roofing.
- Kama – Four-poster bed
- Kama ni Ah Tay – A once popular signature four-poster bed design that was carved by a famous Chinese furniture maker named Eduardo Ah Tay. To have this bed was considered a symbol of status during the Spanish era.
- Kantoneras (brackets) – Either plain calado cut-outs or fully carved embellishments usually placed where beams and columns intersect especially under the soffit or overhanging ceiling outside the house; also seen to decorate door or window openings, hallways or simply dividing spaces
- Lansenas – Kitchen sideboards
- Latrina – Comun
- Load-bearing wall – Wall used in place of posts to bear weight
- Machuca tiles (formerly known as "baldozas mosaicas") – colorful Mediterranean-style cement tiles used for the zaguan flooring, often in harlequin pattern; manufactured by the Machuca company; another brand is Majolica
- Mascaron – An architectural ornament representing a face or head, human or animal, that is often grotesque or frightening

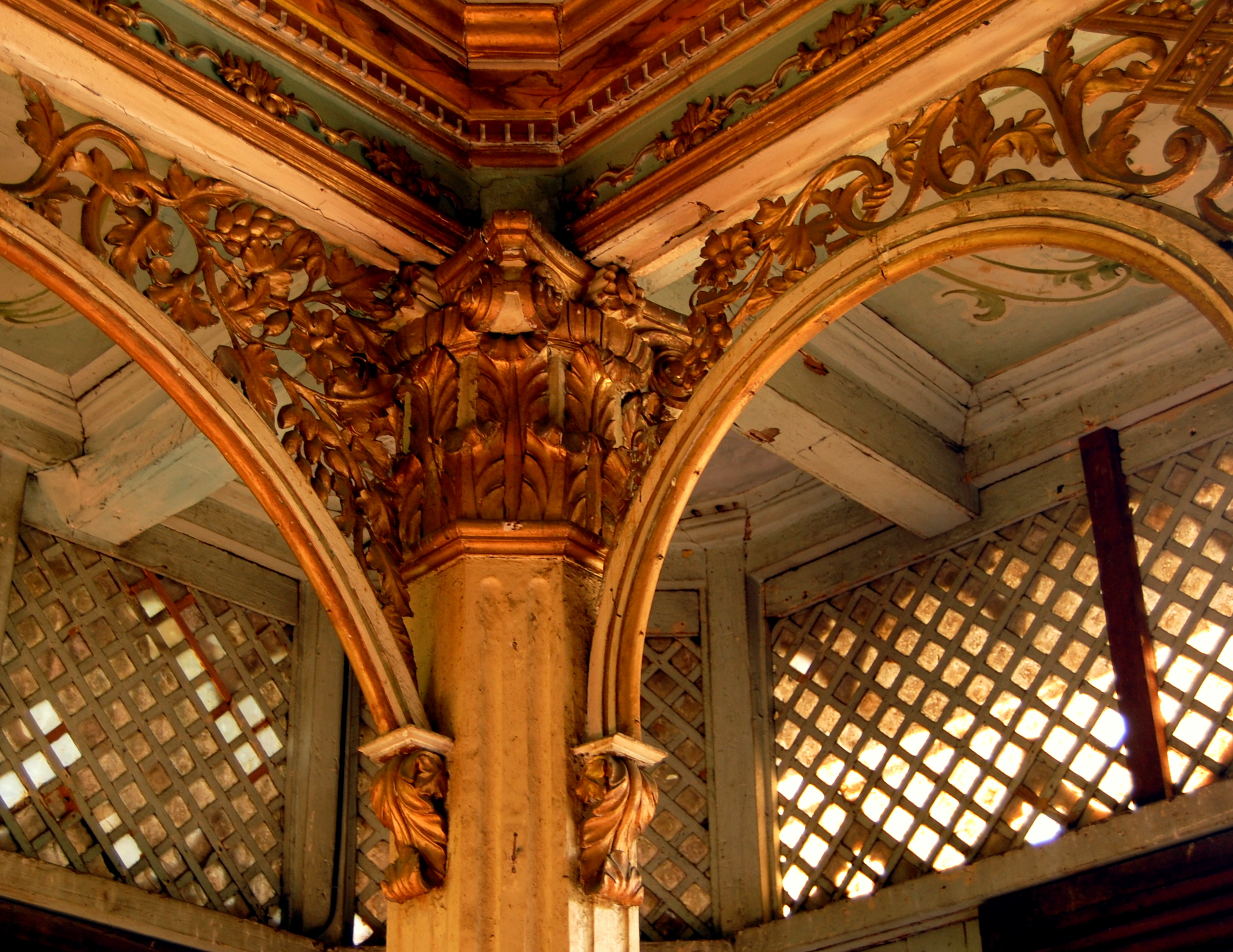
Details of intricate Corinthian woodwork at the Lopez House in Balayan, Batangas

- Media aguas – Canopy or roof shed, consisting of a piece of metal roof that protects the window from rain or heat; not to be confused with awning
- Mirador – Lighthouse; lookout tower
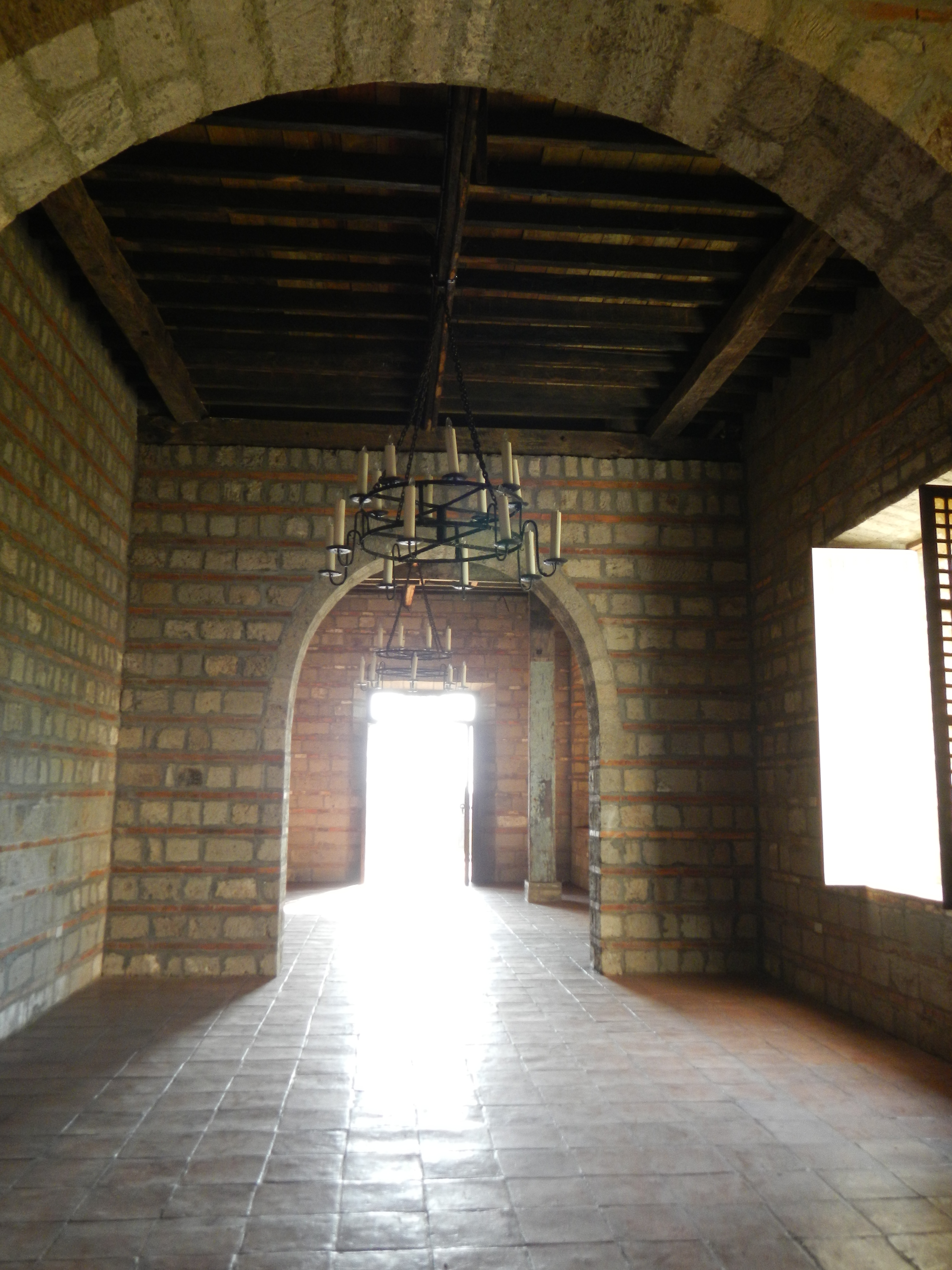
  Zaguan
- Moulding, molding – A strip of material (such as wood or metal) with some design or pattern that is used as a decoration on a wall, on the edge of a table, etc.
- Oratorio – Prayer room with an altar of Christ, the Virgin Mary, and the saints
- Painted metal sheet ceiling – Pressed tin or copper ceiling from maybe late Victorian to early American colonial period, to prevent decay by moisture or worms (or even mouse)
- Paminggalan – A cabinet where leftover food and preserves are stored. The doors of the cabinet have slats so that they can absorb air and room temperature inside. To avoid ants from coming up and getting to the food, the legs of the cabinet are placed on containers filled with kerosene or any liquid
- Pasamano – Window ledge
- Persiana – Louver window
- Piedra china – stone dressed by Chinese-Filipino immigrant stoneworkers used to pave the floor of the zaguan
- Pilaster – False pillar used to give the appearance of a supporting column and to articulate an extent of wall, with only an ornamental function

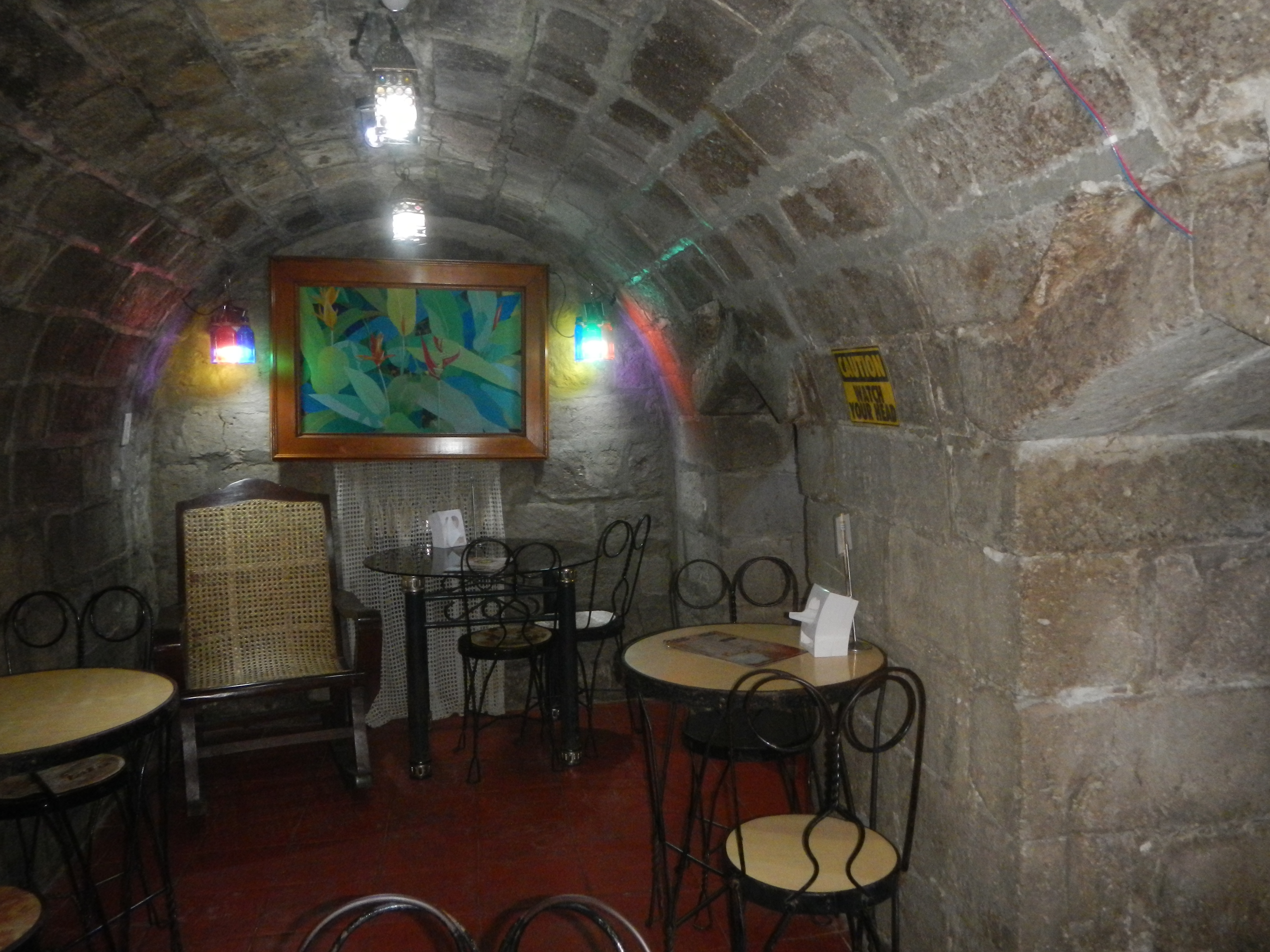
Ground floor chamber

- Platera – Aparador or cabinet for kitchenware (chiefly china)
- Porte cochere – Horse carriage porch or portico at the main entrance
- Portico – "(From Italian) a porch leading to the entrance of a building, or extended as a colonnade, with a roof structure over a walkway, supported by columns or enclosed by walls"
- Puerta – "Door of the entrada principal (main entrance)"
- Puertita – "small cut door that is part of the puerta"
- Pugon – Clay oven
- Punkah – Ceiling cloth fan
- Sala mayor – Main living room, a place for late-afternoon parties called tertulias and dances called "bailes"
- Sala menor – Secondary living room
- Sillas americanas – "American chairs, considered the Monobloc chairs of their time (due to ubiquity)"
- Silla perezosa – Lazy chair
- Solihiya – Typical wicker weave pattern in furniture
- Stained glass – "Glass colored or stained (as by fusing metallic oxides into it) for decorative applications (as in windows)"
- Teja de curva - Spanish curving clay tiles (also called "Monk and Nun" in English) used for roofing (often mistaken for Chinese tubular roof tiles)
- Transom – "Transverse horizontal structural beam or bar" often in floral tracery design
- Trompe-l'œil – "A style of painting in which things are painted in a way that makes them look like real objects"
- Tumba-tumba – Philippine rocking chair
- Tympanum – triangular decorative wall surface over an entrance, door or window
- Valance – "A length of decorative drapery hung above a window to screen the curtain fittings"
- Ventana – "Wooden window panel that uses a grid pattern with flattened Capiz-shell panes"; often in sliding style, as opposed to flinging out
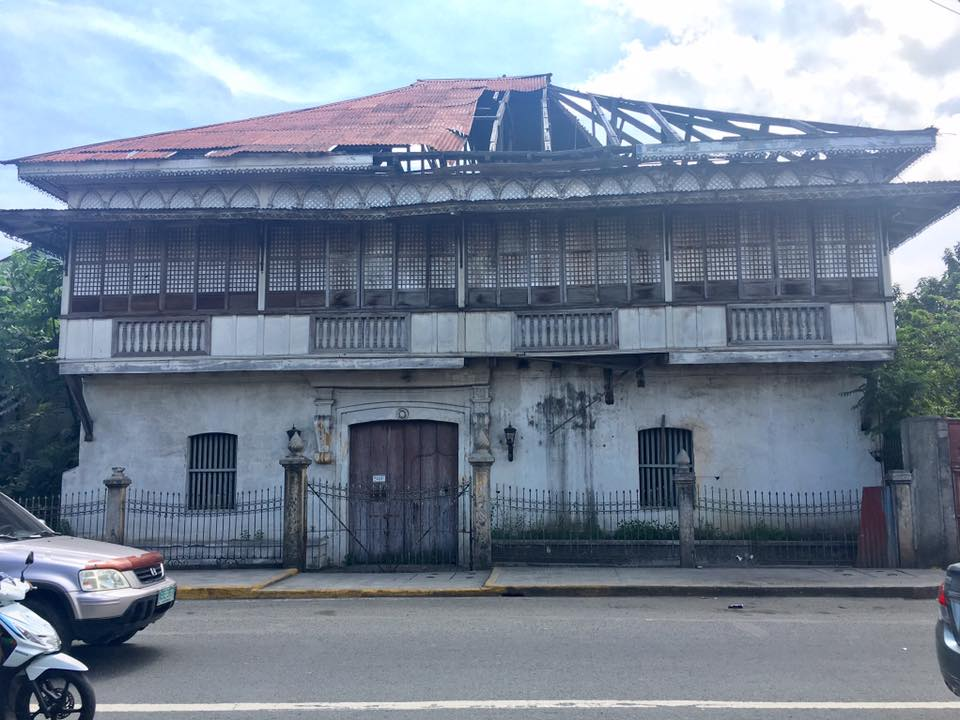
  Some Bahay na Bato are falling into abandonment.
- Ventanilla – Literally 'small window'; "sliding panels between the floor and windows" to allow more air and light; "usually protected by balustrades which can either be wooden or wrought iron grills"
- Volada – "An enclosed overhanging balcony"; "a gallery (along the elaborate system of windows) which protects the rooms from the heat of the sun"
- Yerong pukpok – Gingerbread trim
- Zaguan – Ground floor (literally "passageway" in Arabic) to accommodate horse carriages and carrozas (processional carriages)

== See also ==
- Culture of the Philippines
- Architecture of the Philippines
  - Ancestral houses
  - Bahay kubo
  - Earthquake Baroque
  - Torogan
- History of the Philippines (1565–1898)
- Colonial architecture of Southeast Asia
- Sino-Portuguese architecture
- Shophouse
- Rumah adat
- Rumah melayu
- Spanish colonial architecture
