= Ventanilla (Philippine architecture) =

Feature in Philippine architecture

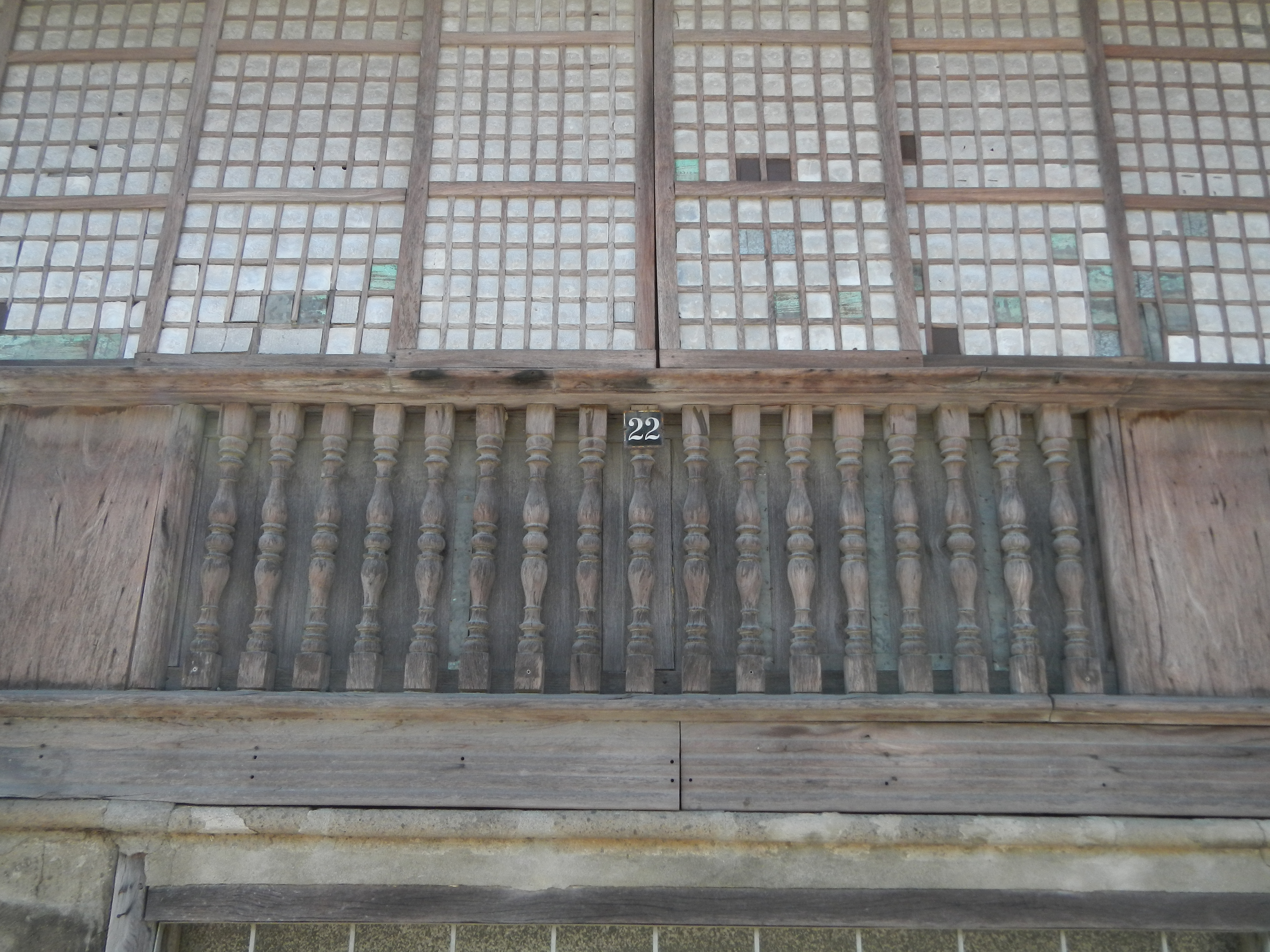
A closed ventanilla below a capiz shell main window.

In Philippine architecture, the ventanilla is a small window or opening below a larger window's casement, created—often reaching the level of the floor—to allow either additional air into a room during hot days or some air during hot nights when the main window's panes are drawn. It also allows for more light to strike the floor.

The ventanilla is often used on upper floor windows, as in the bahay na bato. As the lower part of a composite window, its larger upper part is typically a window with sliding capiz shell-paned panels. The ventanilla is just under this upper large window's sill and is typically made with sliding panel-covers behind balusters or grills.

Bobby Mañosa's traditional methods for his design of the Coconut Palace is considered as displaying a fine example of how ventanillas can be applied in modern Philippine architecture.

== Gallery ==
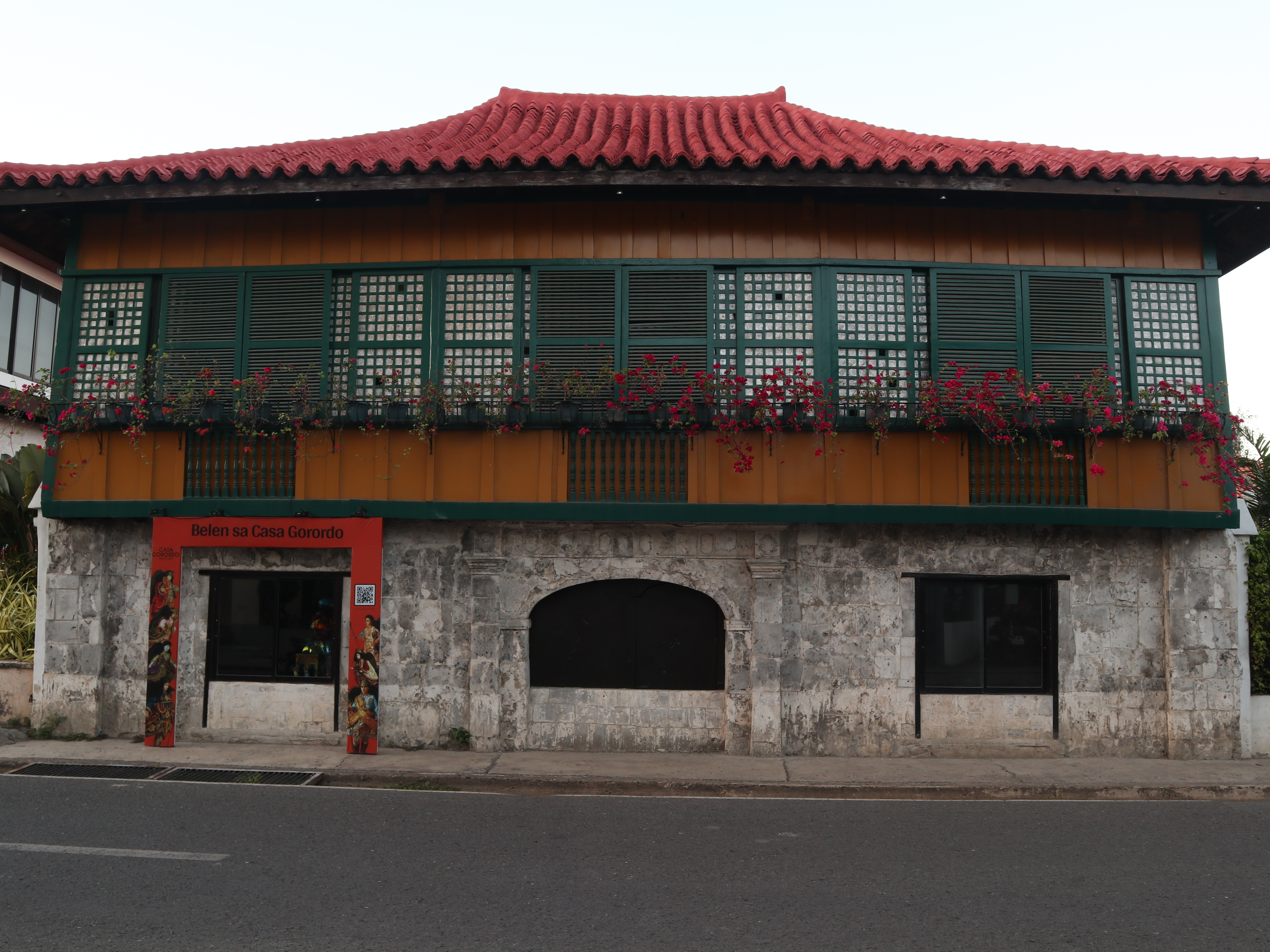
Closed ventanillas below capiz shell windows with louver exterior shutters of Casa Gorordo Museum in Cebu City.

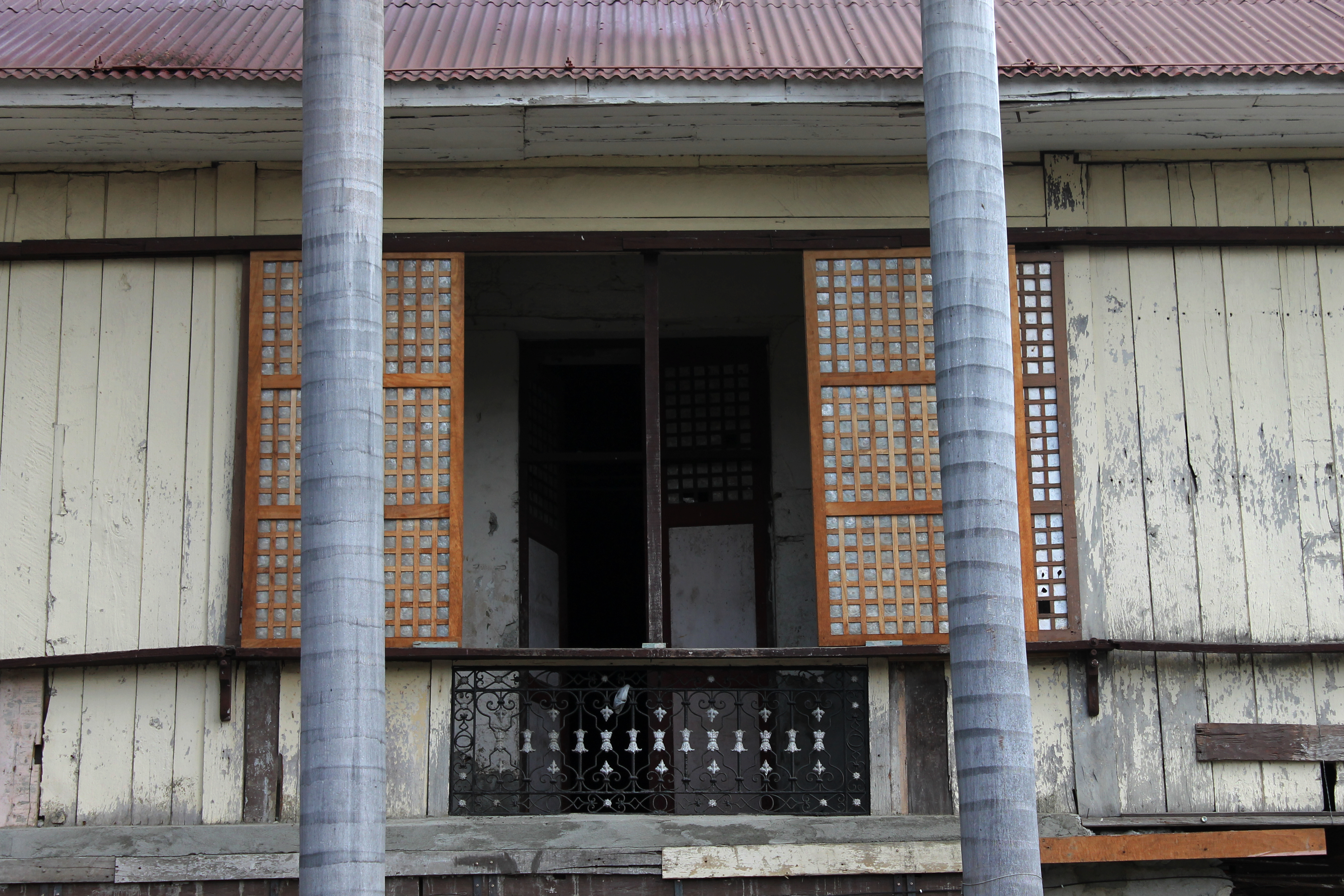
An opened grilled ventanilla below a capiz shell window of the convent of Saints Peter and Paul Parish Church in Calasiao, Pangasinan.

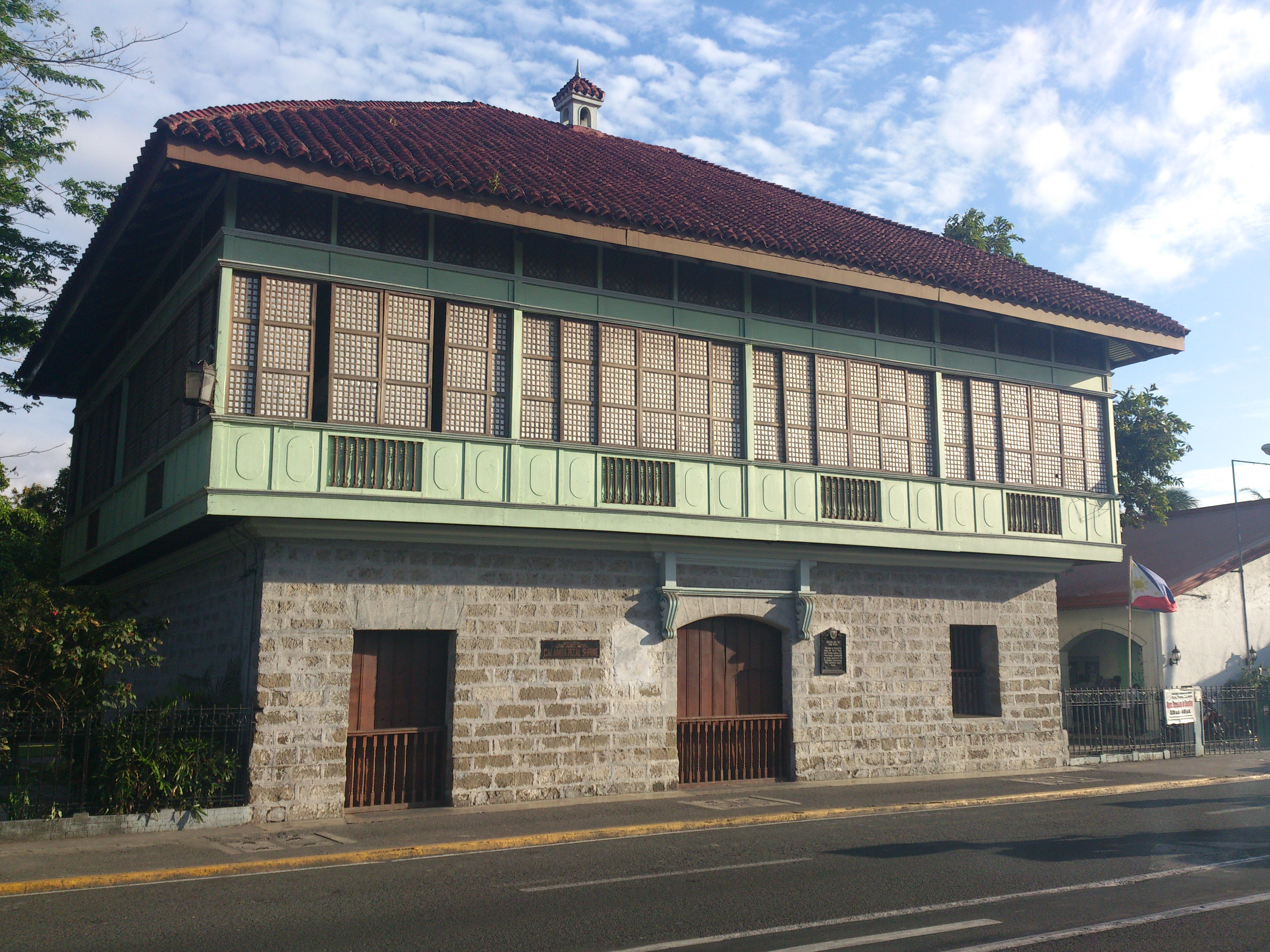
The Rizal Shrine—a reproduction of the original two-storey, Spanish-colonial style house in Calamba, Laguna where José Rizal was born and grew up in—has four ventanillas at its main structure's front and two at each of its sides.

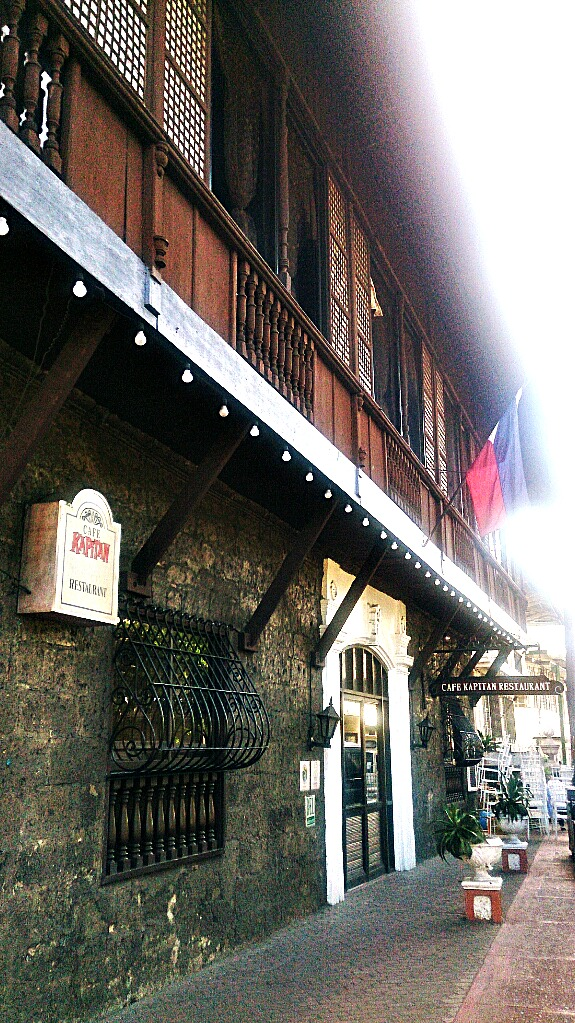
Side view of the wooden ventanilla balusters of the Kapitan Moy Residence.

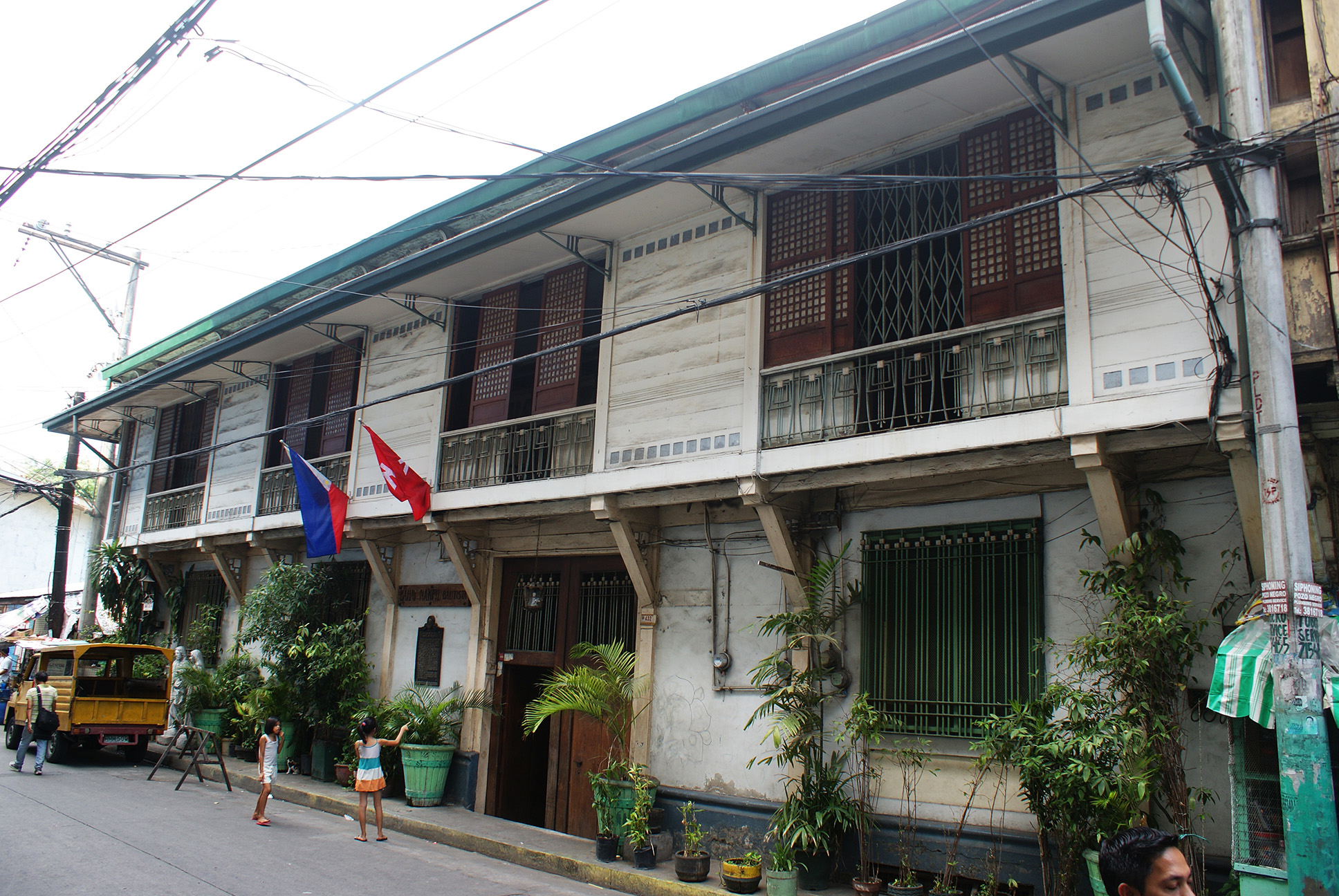
Opened ventanillas at the Bahay Nakpil-Bautista, boasting their lyre-shaped grilles.

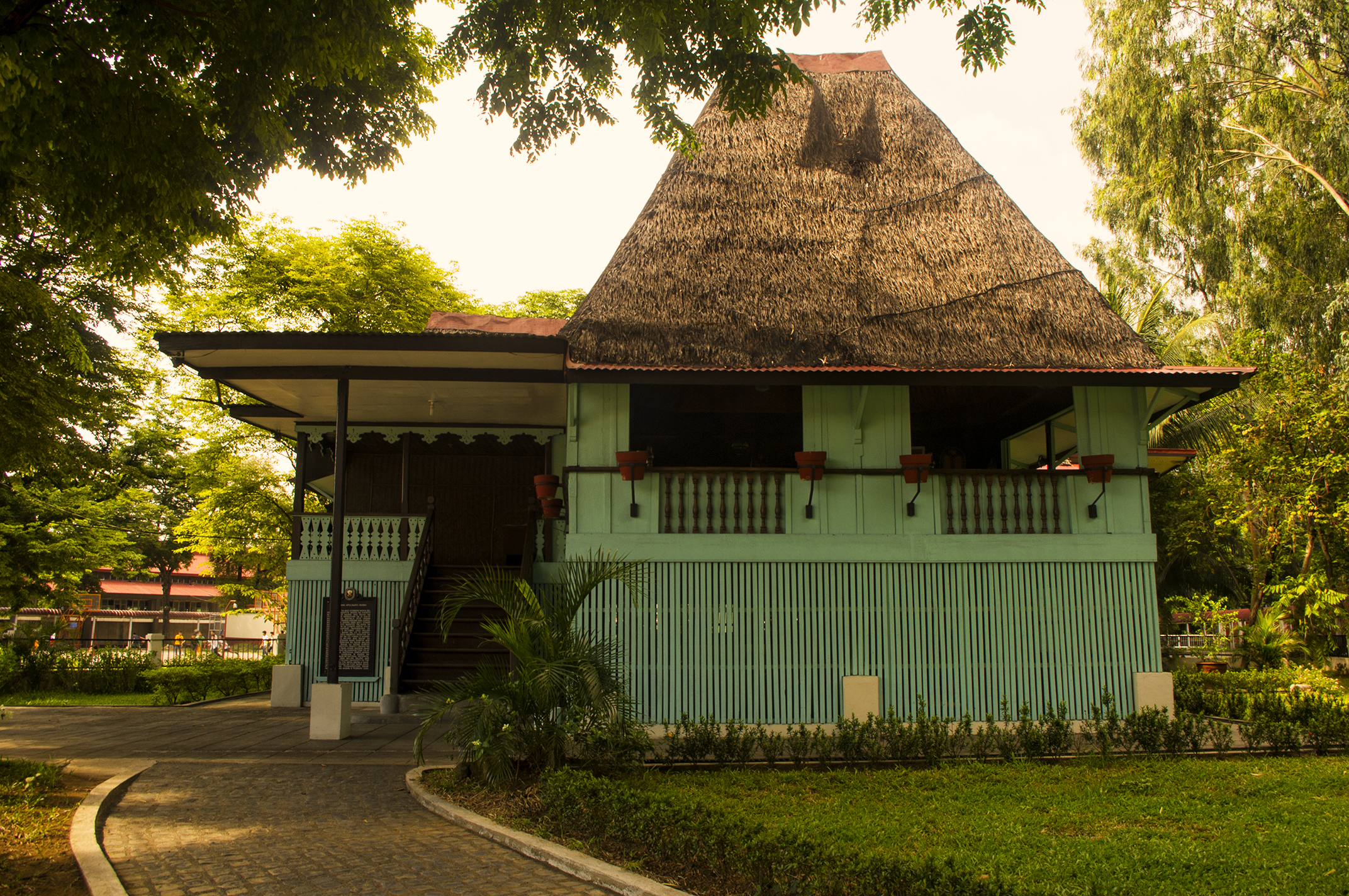
The large front windows of Apolinario Mabini's bahay kubo house augmented by ventanillas.

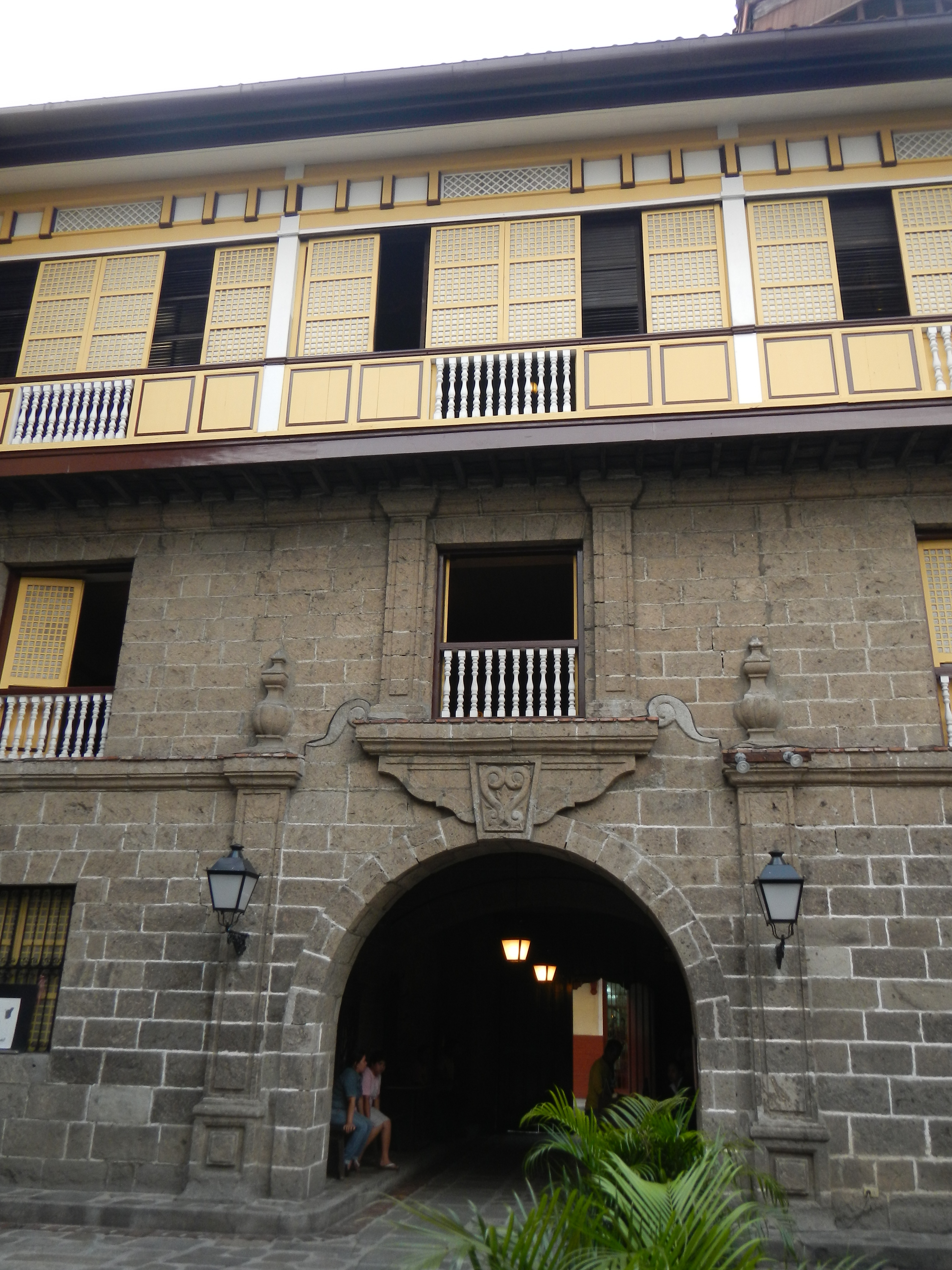
Ventanillas on the third floor of Casa Manila, not to be confused with the balconets on the second floor.

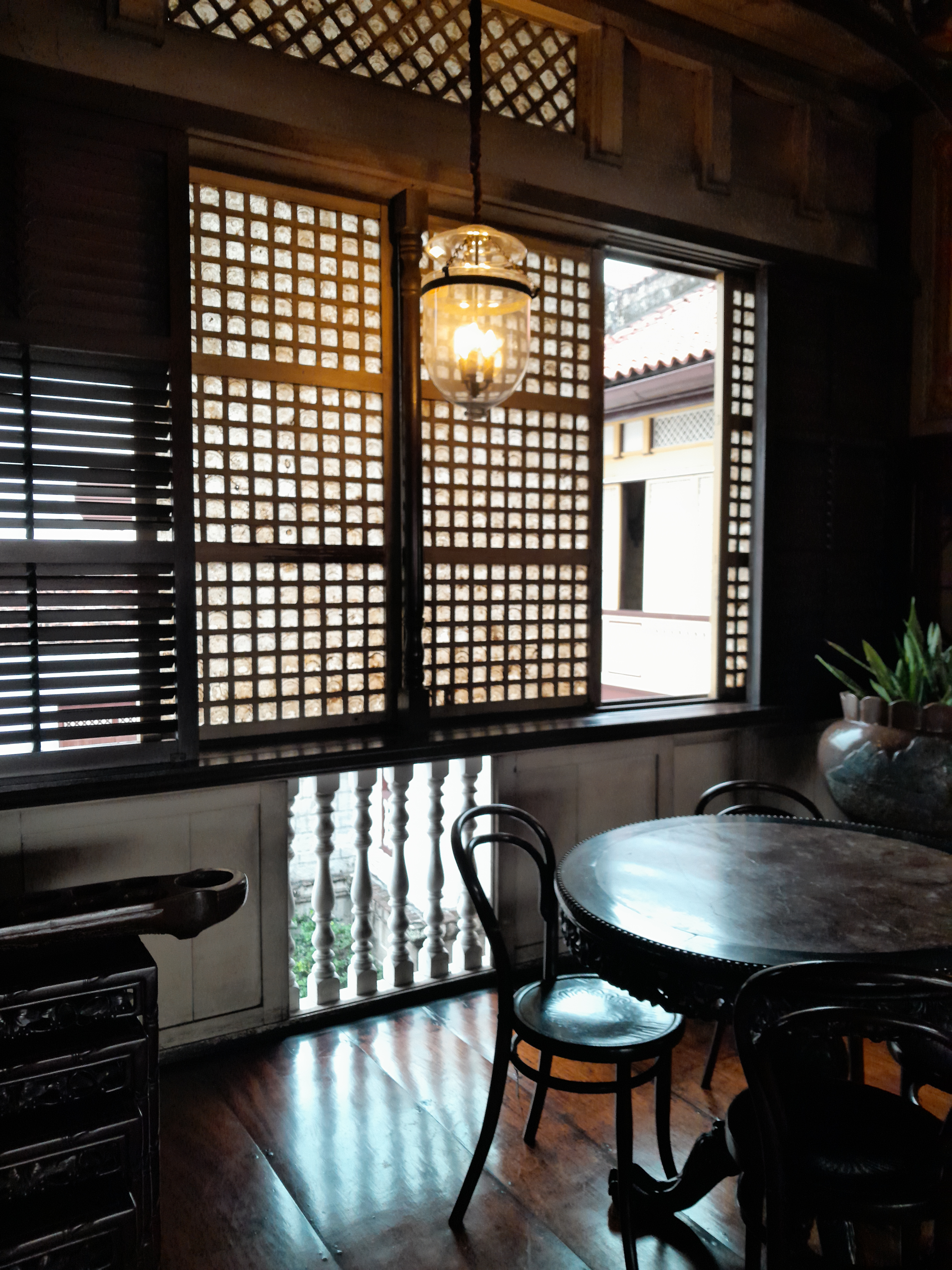
Interior view of a capiz shell window with a ventanilla on the third floor of Casa Manila.

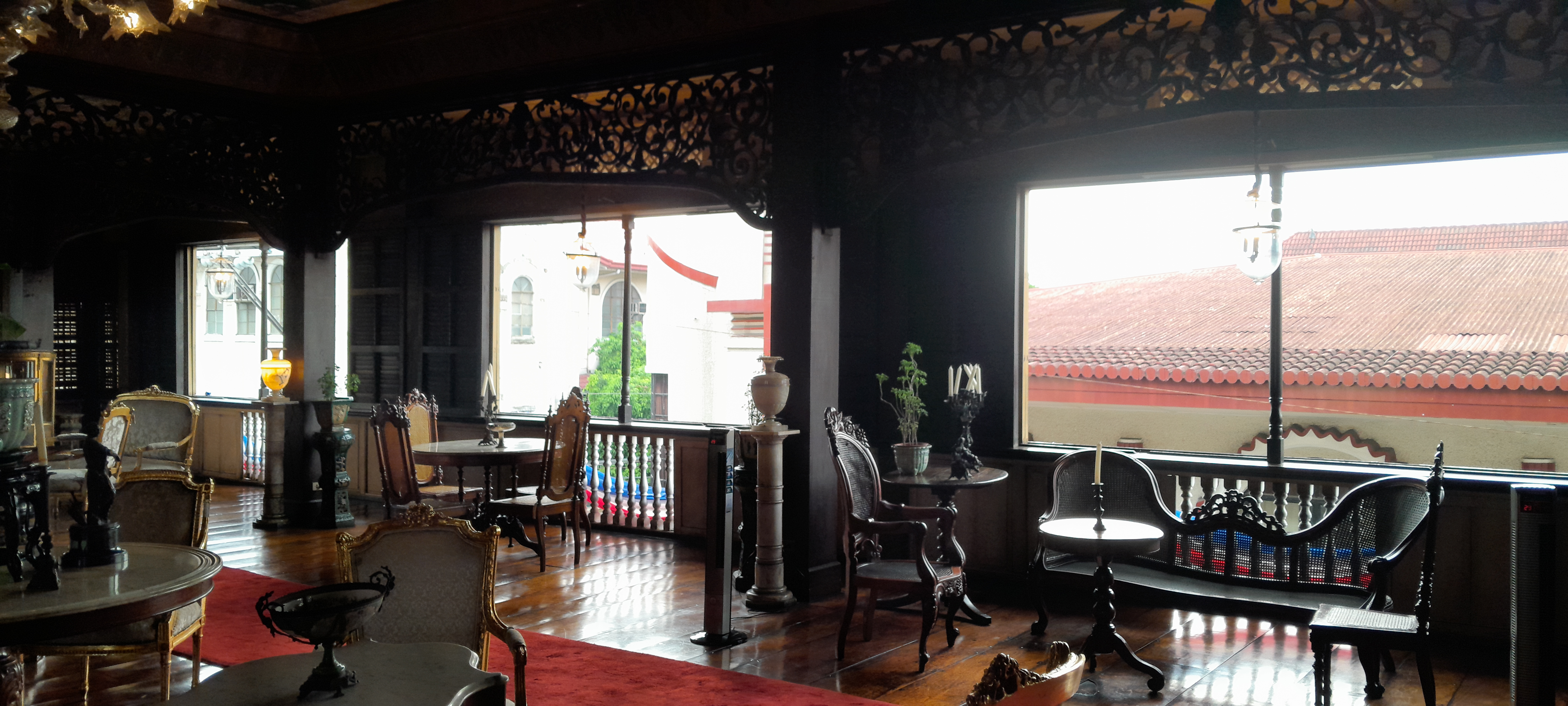
The main hall on the third floor of Casa Manila with its capiz shell windows and ventanillas fully open.

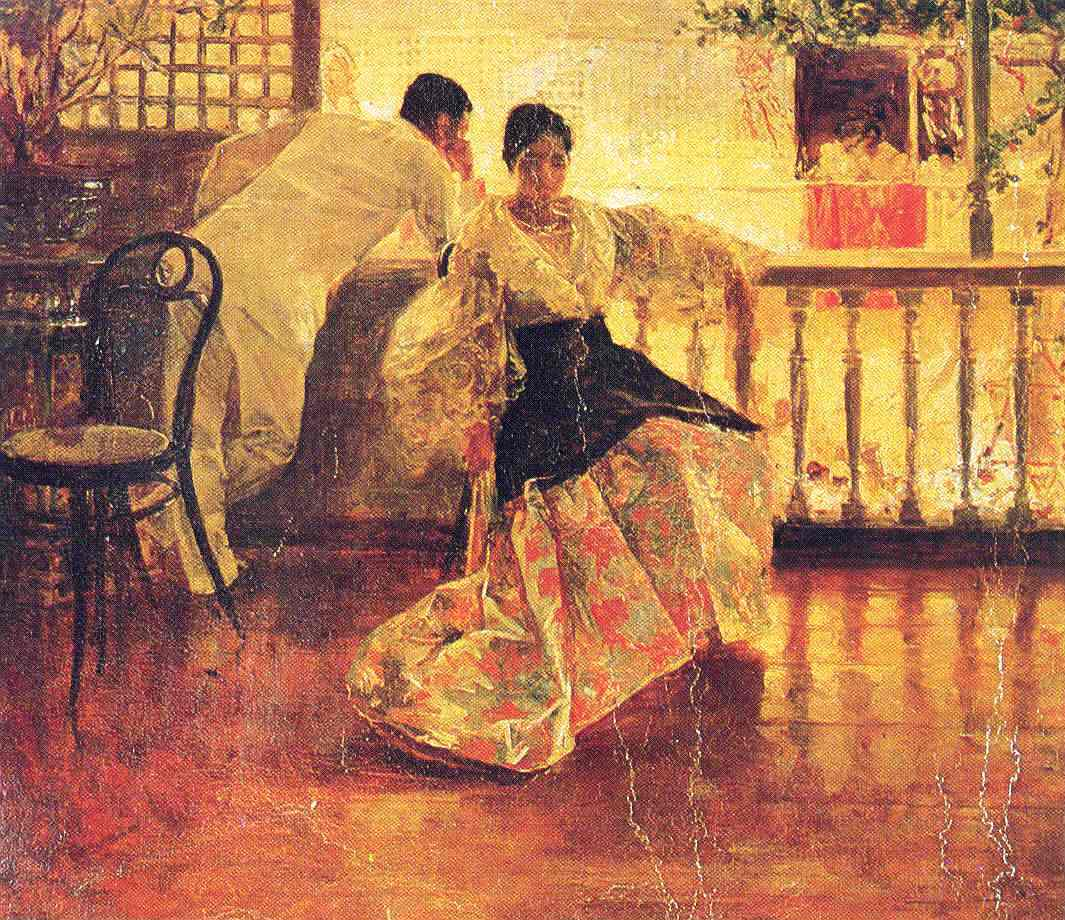
Juan Luna's painting Tampuhan depicts a couple beside a large ventanilla.

== See also ==
- Balconet
