= Capiz shell window =

Philippine architectural feature

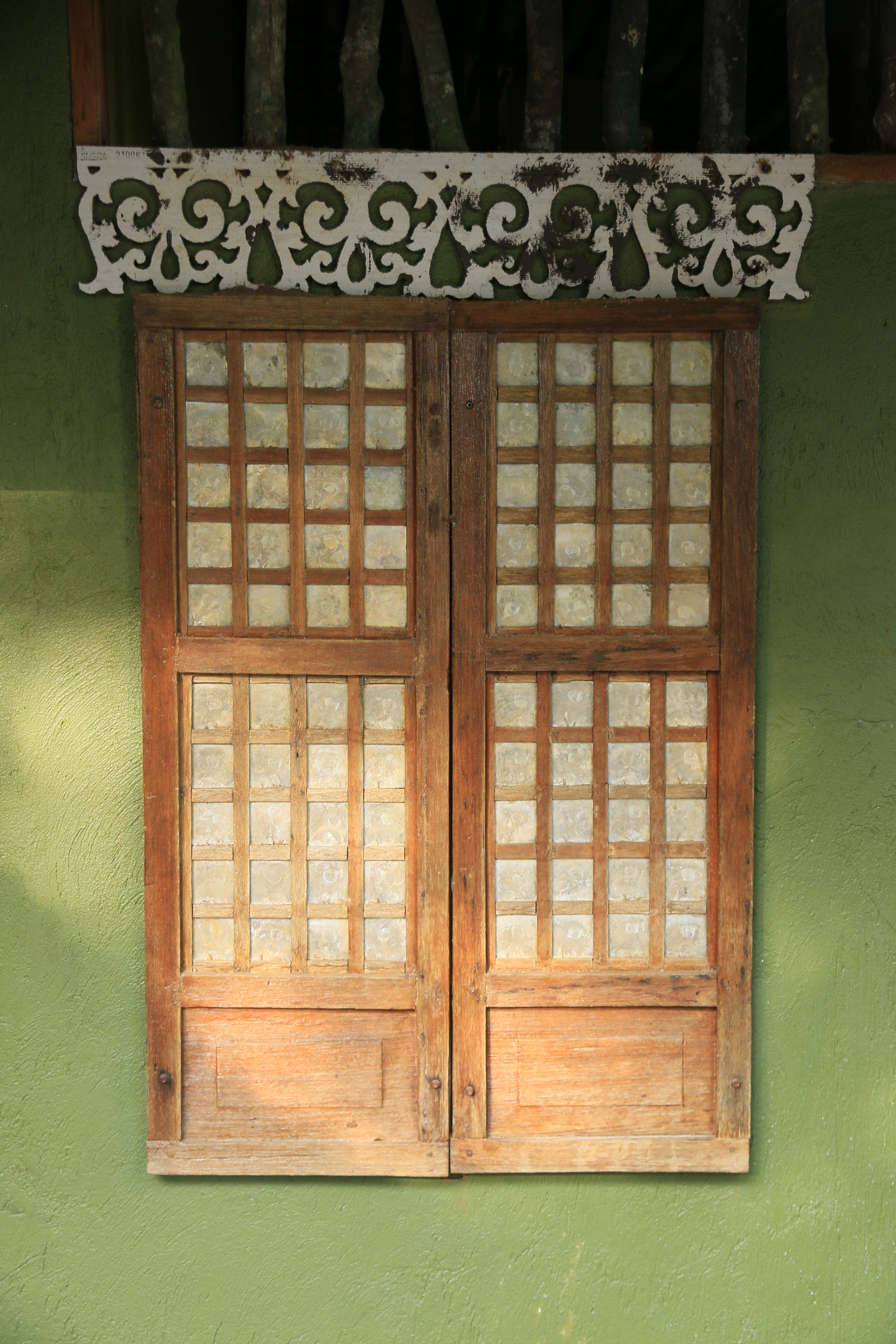
A closed capiz-shell window

In Philippine architecture, the capiz shell window is a type of window with small panes that use the translucent and durable capiz shell (windowpane oyster shell) instead of glass. The Chinese were presumably the first to use the shell, the dissemination of which use has been credited to the Portuguese; extensive and widespread use of the shell for windows and other handicraft products as a substitute for the then more scarce and more expensive glass was seen in Portuguese settlements as well as in India in the 17th century.

During the length of the Spanish colonization of the Philippines, churches and homes used the capiz shell for windowpanes, cabinet decorations, and handicrafts starting in 1755, while before this period the seashell was only used widely in the decoration of weapons, clothes, and trading goods. It is believed that the shell was first used architecturally in the making of slide windows for the churches of the Catholic Church in the Philippines. Philippine text history confirms the continued popularity of the capiz shell as a Philippine architectural element in the 19th century through the entry "Capiz" in the 1860 edition of Vocabolario de la lengua tagala, the first dictionary of the Tagalog language; the entry for "Capiz" refers to it as "la Ventana" (the Window). Today, the shell is also used in the manufacture of decorative items, including mobiles, chandeliers, Christmas lanterns (the parol), and various other products.

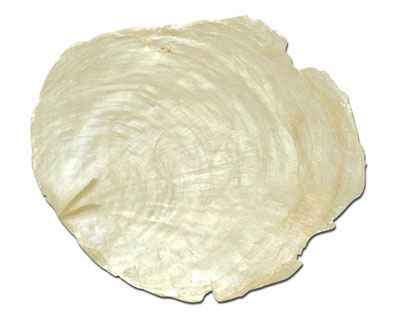
A piece of capiz shell

Panels from the early centuries of capiz-shell window-making show tight mortise and tenon lap joints on the frames, done using only chisels and hardwood dowels. The lattice work often show the delicate capiz shell inserted into a less than 1/16" groove. The flat shells of Capiz, the Philippine province where the oyster is most abundant and after which the Philippine windowpane oyster has been called, can grow to over 150 mm in diameter, reaching maturity between 70 and 100 mm, making the size of the panes of Philippine capiz-shell windows variable.

On June 12, 2020, the National Museum of the Philippines launched an online exhibition titled "Placuna placenta: Capis Shells and Windows to Indigenous Artistry" alongside other government institutions' celebrations commemorating the 122nd anniversary of Philippine independence.

== Bahay na bato ==
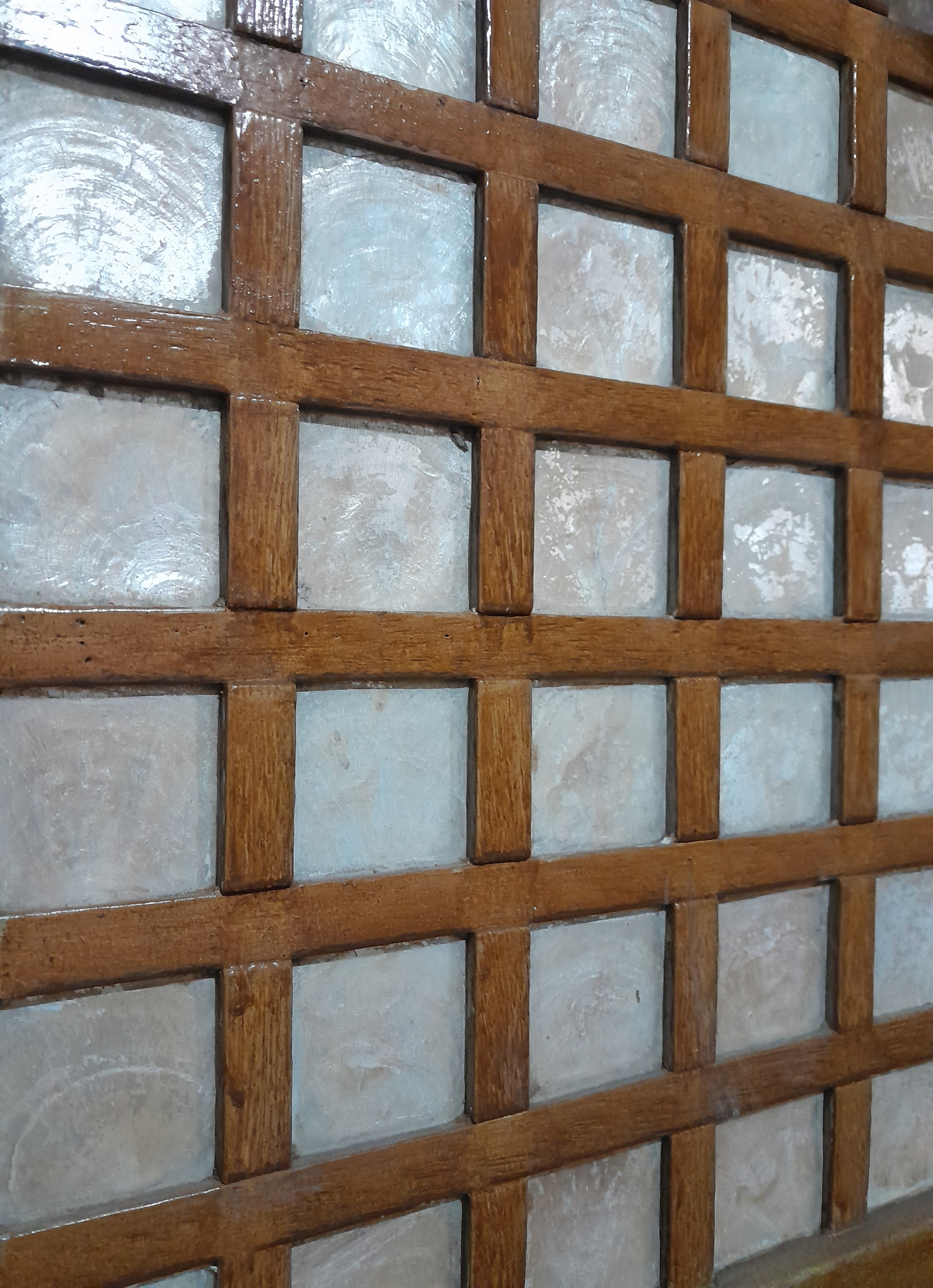
Close-up of the panes of a capiz-shell window panel

In 19th-century Philippine colonial architecture, bahay na bato houses extensively used the capiz-shell window element. Designed to take advantage of tropical cool breezes, these houses' large windows were built at least a meter high and as wide as five meters. The typically sliding panels with conchas or lattice work (muntins) that would carry the windows' capis panes would be drawn shut when there is too much wind, with the house still taking in daylight during the storm.

== Shell sources ==
In the year 2000, there were at least 27 natural kapis beds in the Philippines, the major sources being in Sapian Bay and Roxas City, Capiz; Oton and Tigbauan, Iloilo; San Miguel Bay in Camarines Norte and Camarines Sur; Hinigaran and Pontevedra, Negros Occidental; Mangarin Bay in Mindoro Occidental; and Panguil Bay in Misamis Occidental.

== Gallery ==
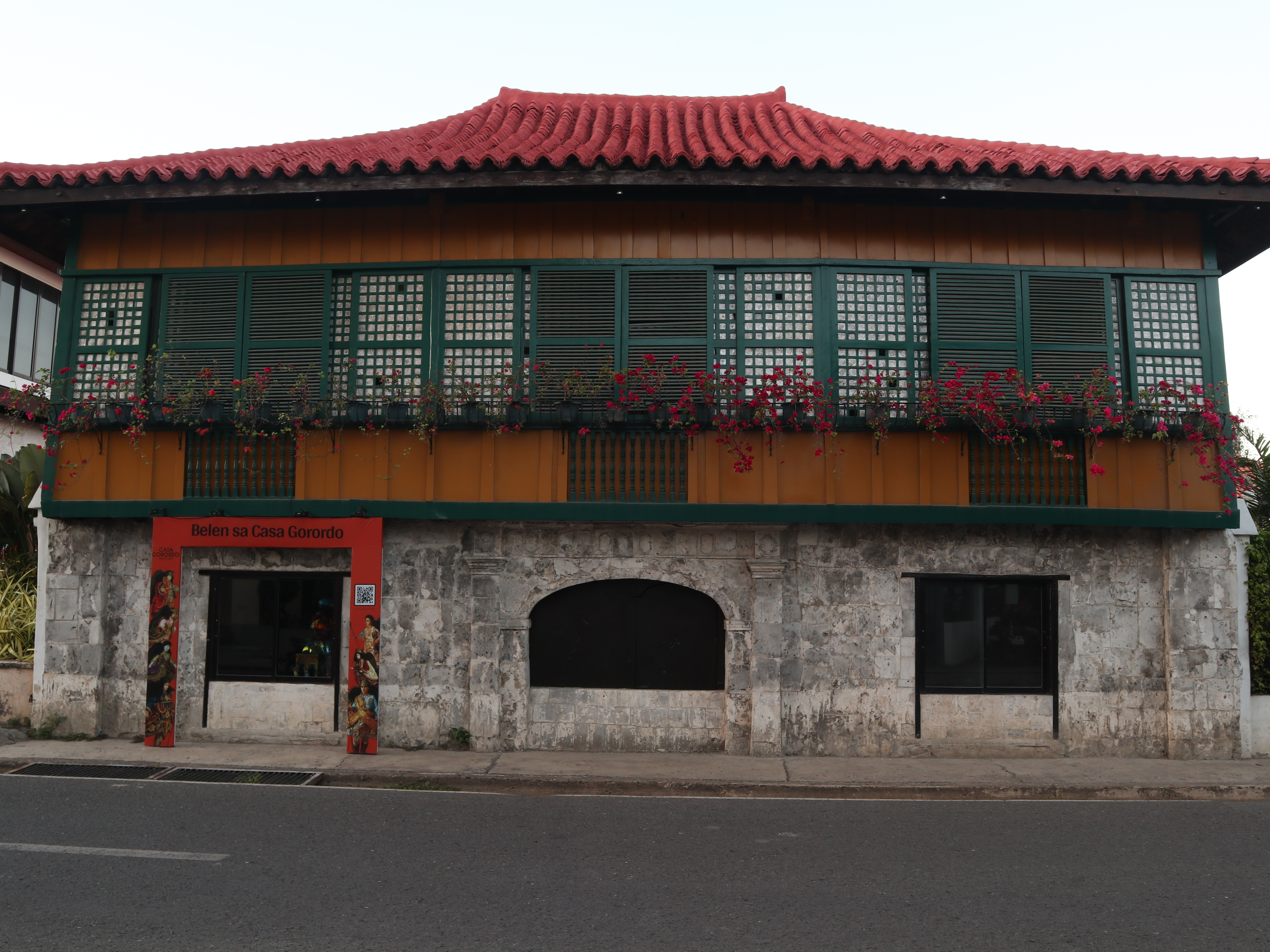
Capiz shell windows with louver exterior shutters of Casa Gorordo Museum in Cebu City

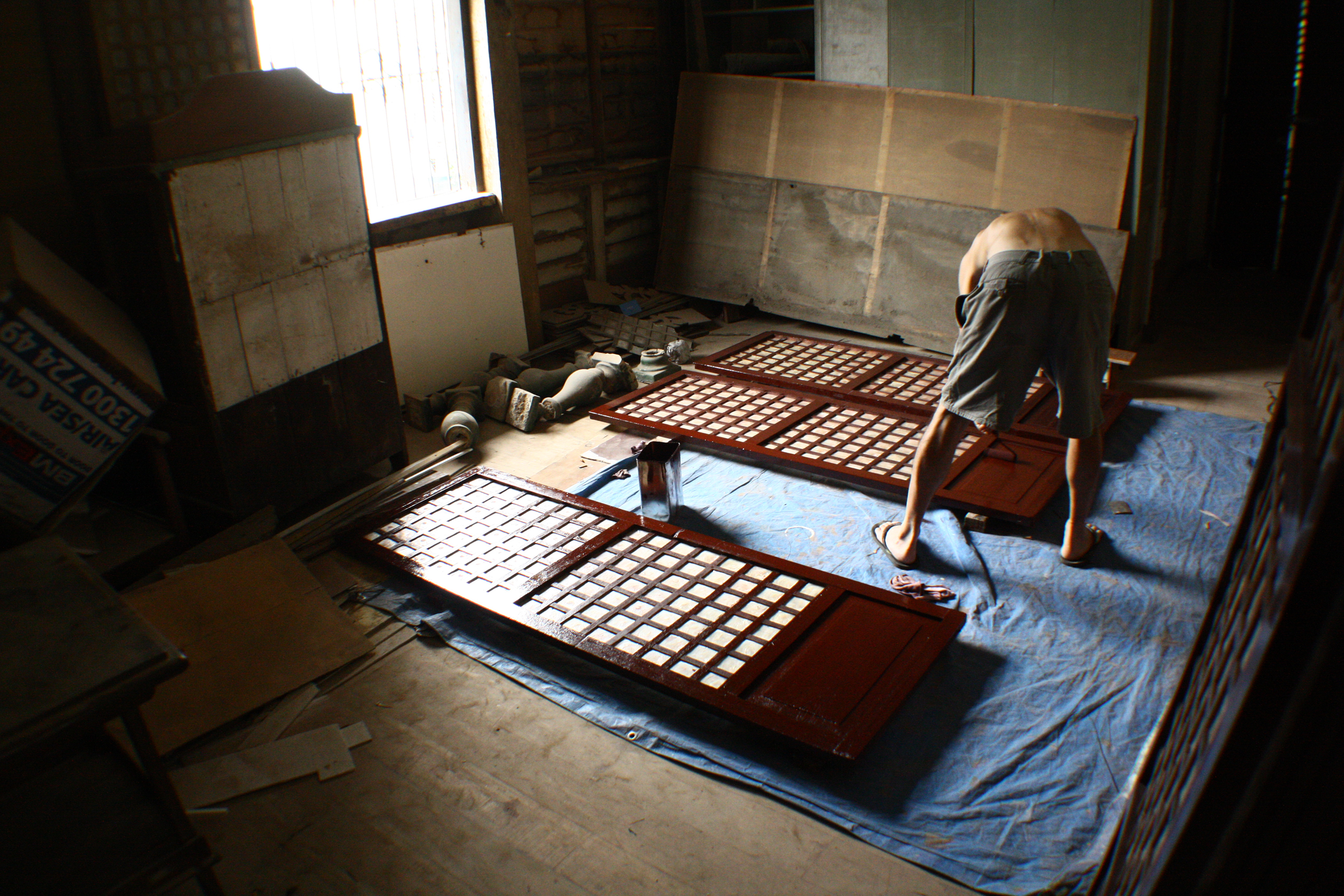
A man repainting the frames and muntins of three capiz-shell window sashes.

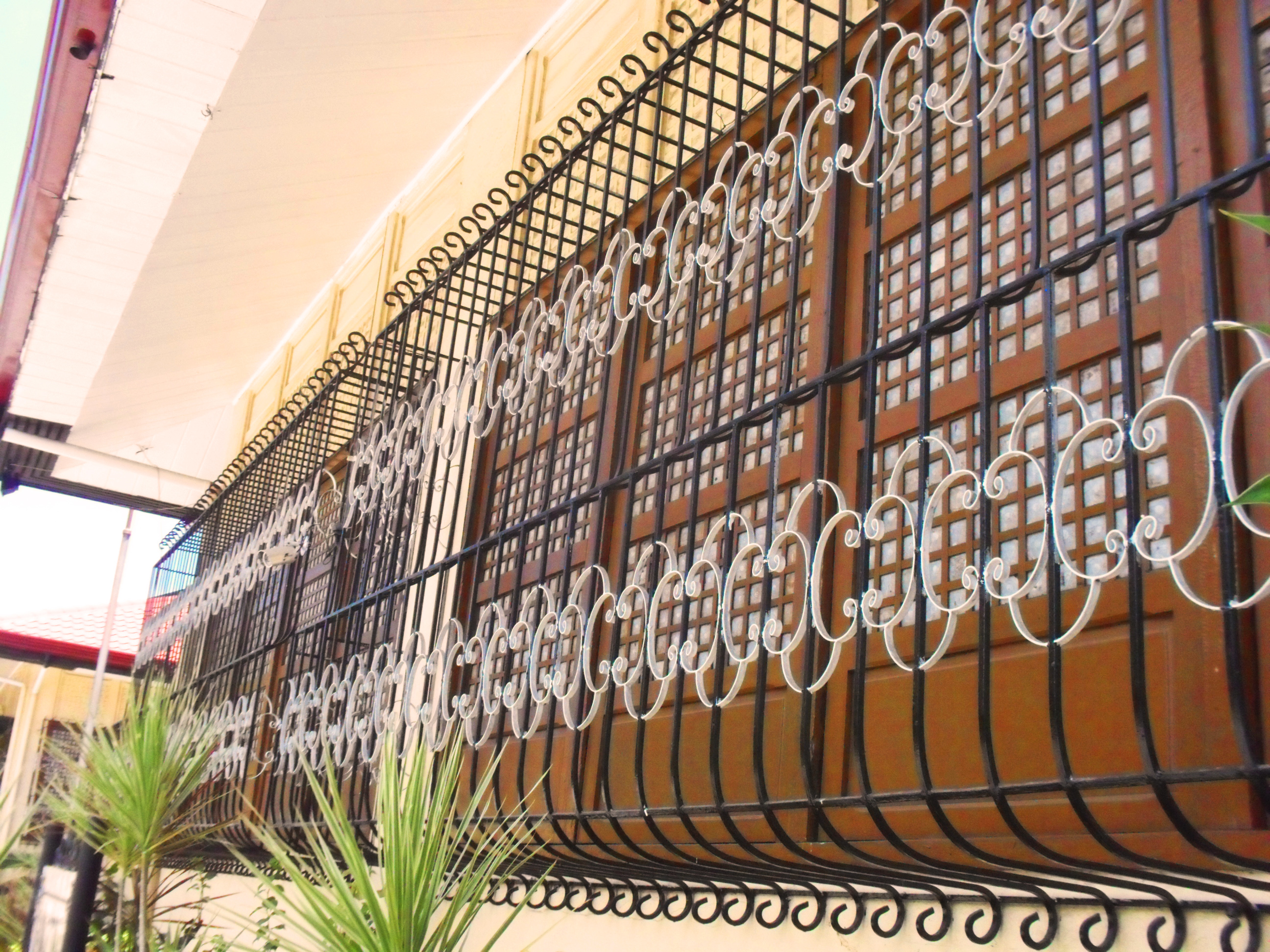
Las Piñas Gabaldon Hall's row of capiz-shell windows with grills

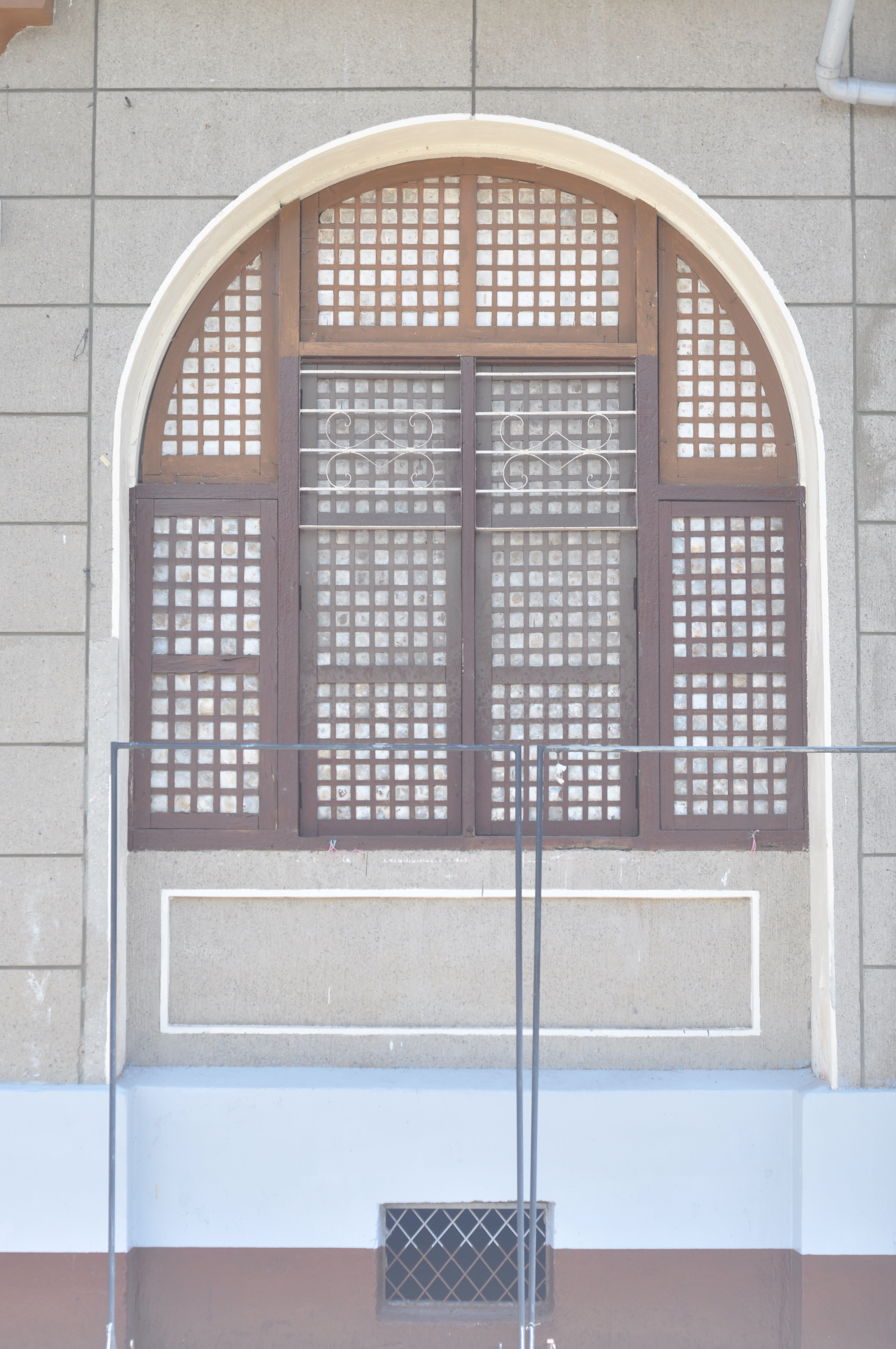
A Camarines Sur high-school building's large capiz-shell window

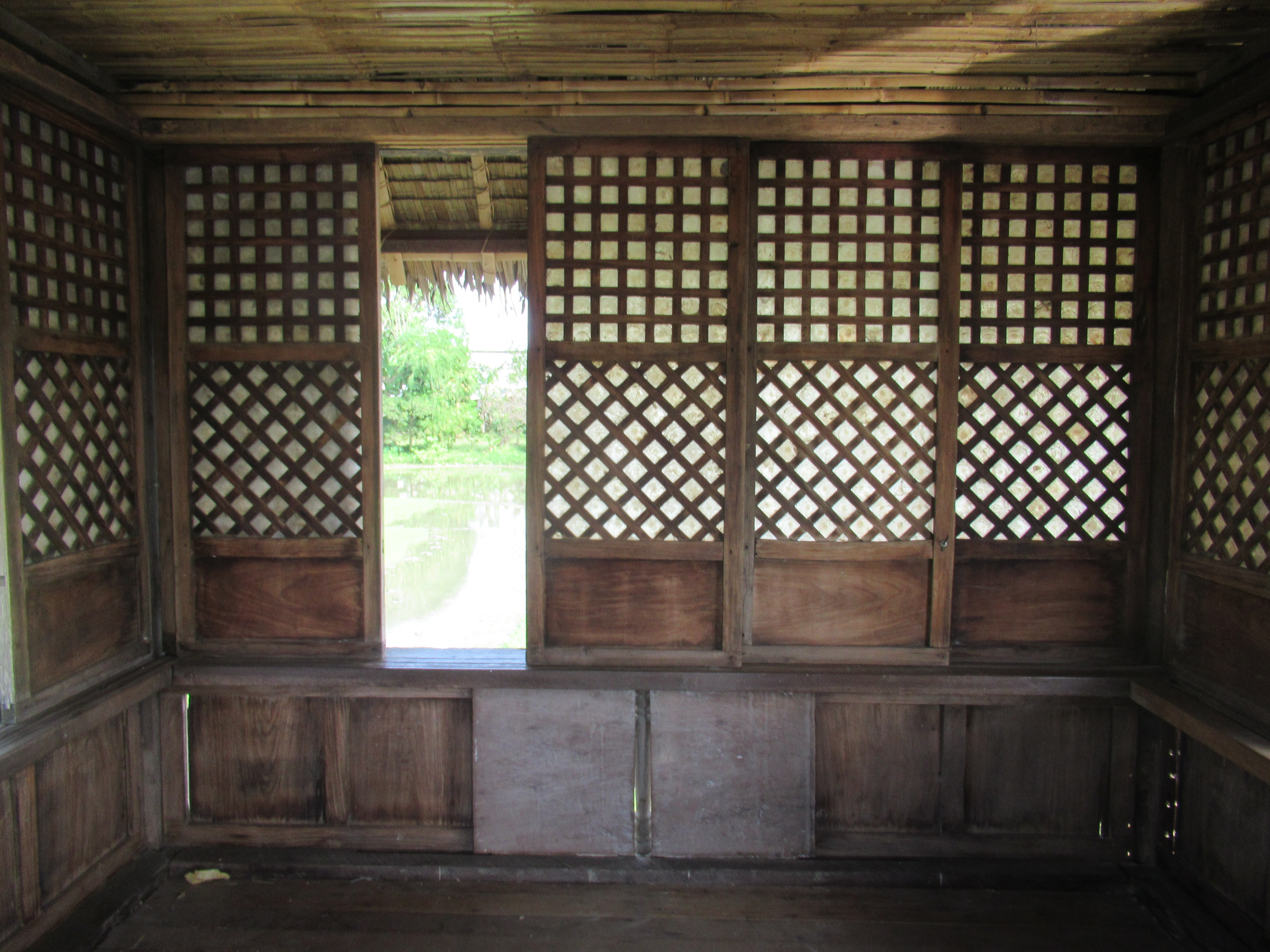
Bahay kubo interior featuring sliding capiz shell windows

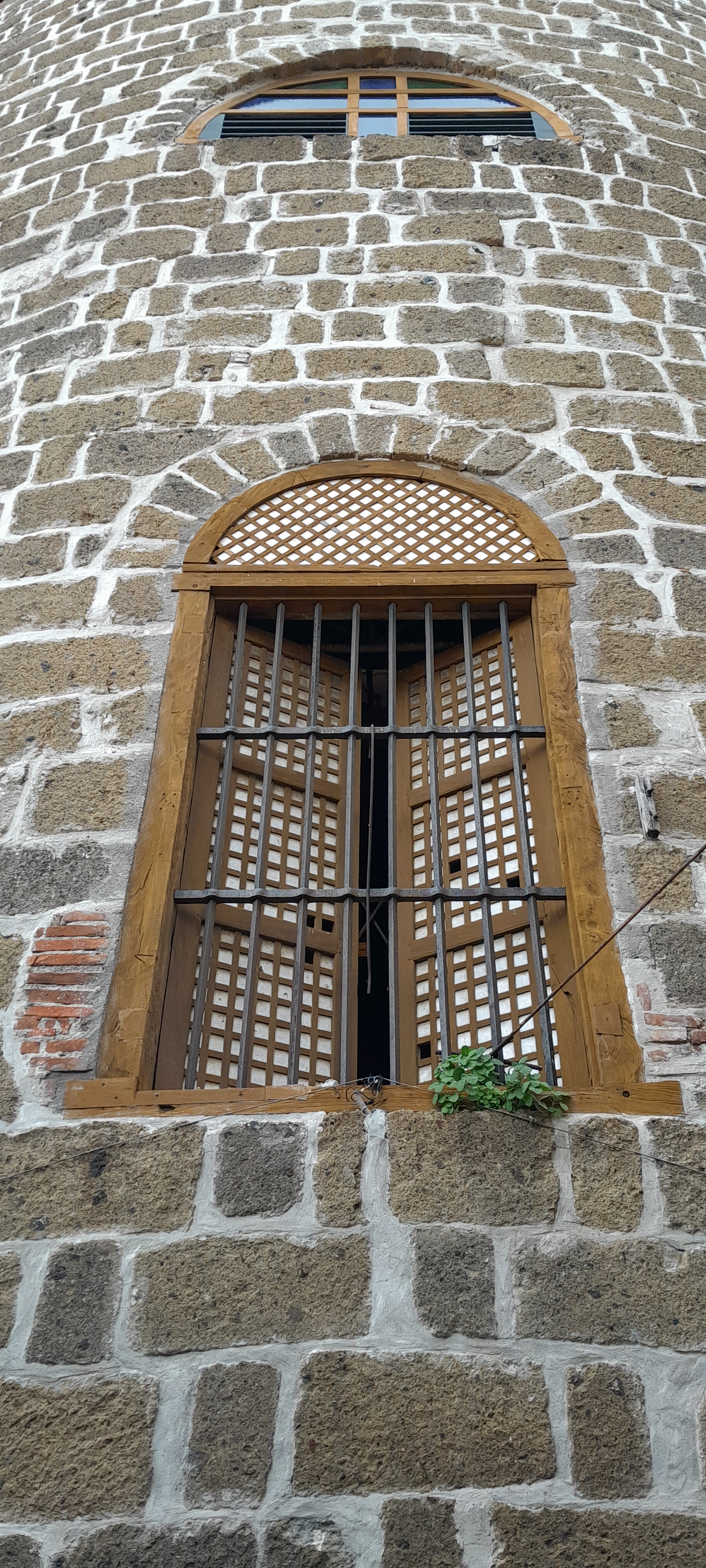
A capiz shell window on a side tower of the Taal Basilica in Taal, Batangas

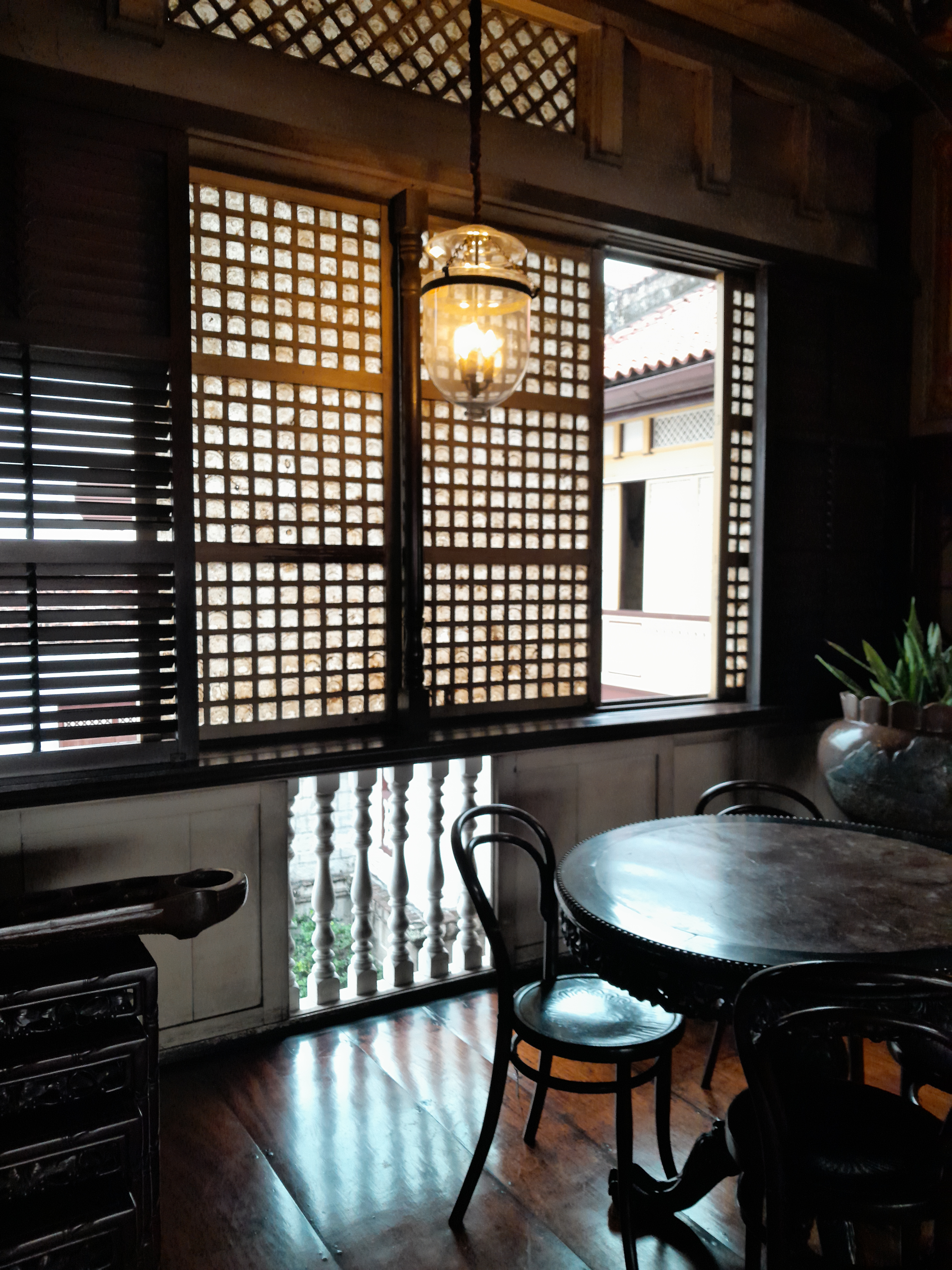
View of a capiz shell window and its ventanilla from inside the third floor of Casa Manila

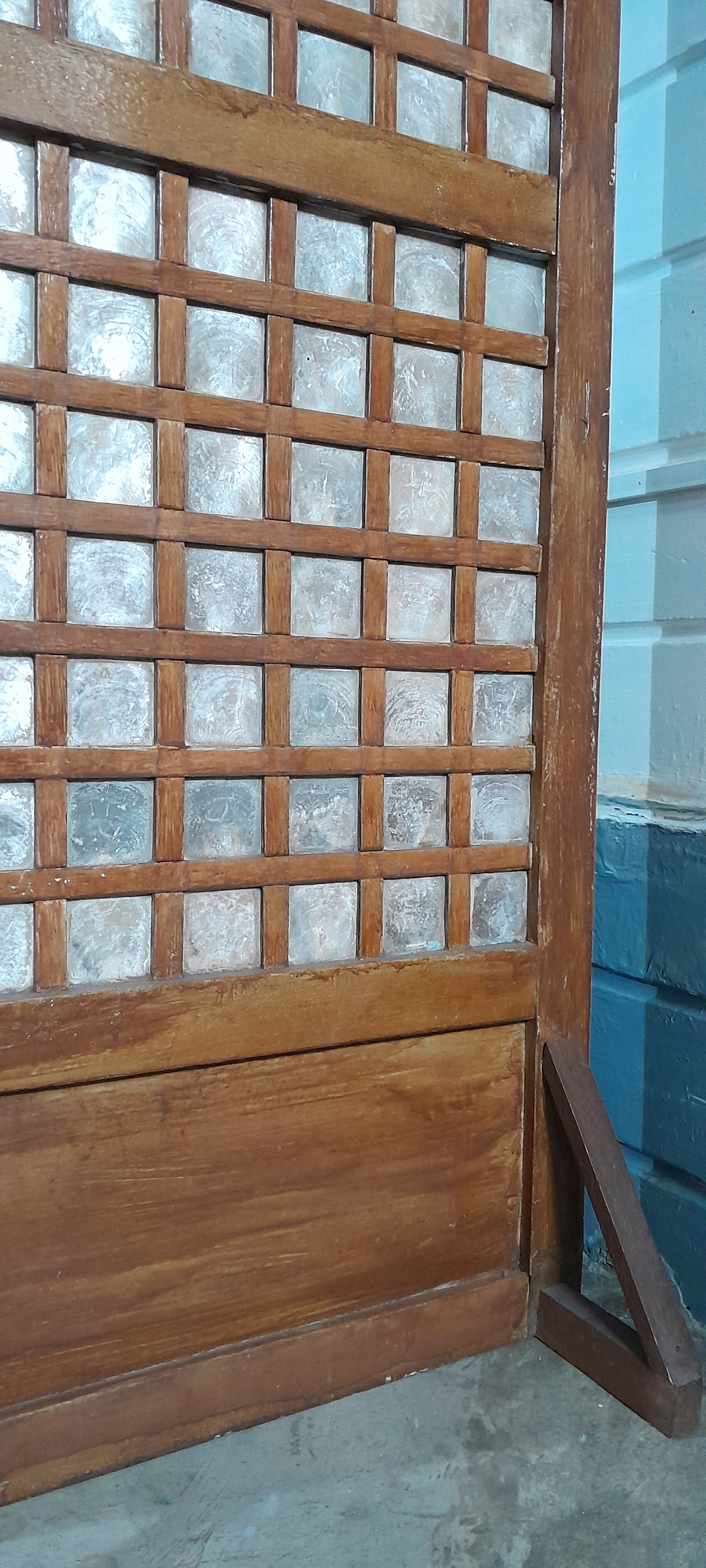
A disused panel from a capiz shell window repurposed as a tsuitate

== See also ==
- Ventanilla
- Gabaldon School Buildings
