= Las Piñas Gabaldon Hall =

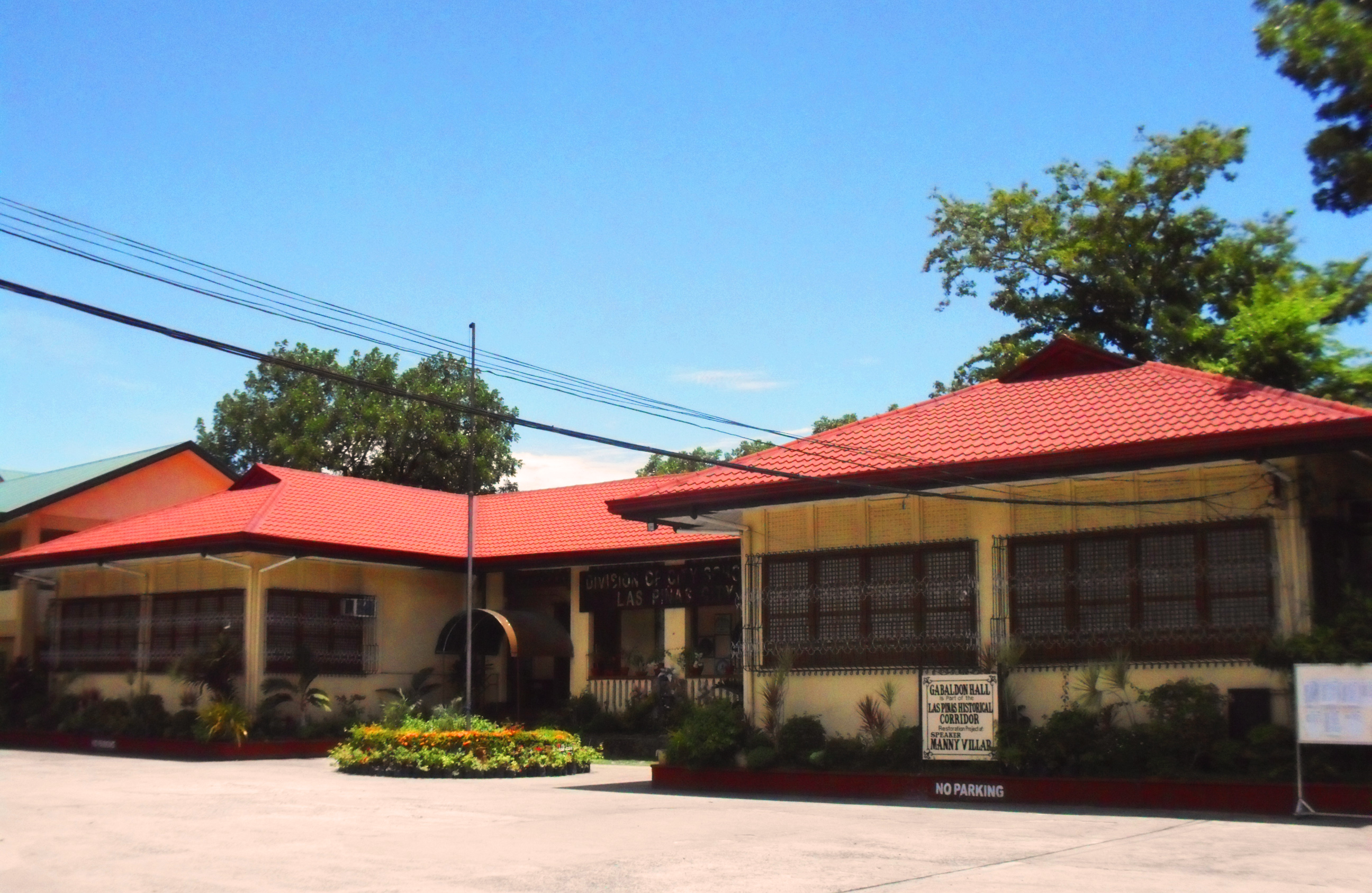

General information
- Status: Used as a Division Office (formerly used as a school building)
- Architectural style: Neo Classical Revival
- Classification: Single Detached / Freestanding
- Address: Diego Cera Avenue, Elias Aldana, Las Piñas
- Town or city: Las Piñas
- Country: Philippines
- Completed: Between 1907 and 1916
- Affiliation: Department of Education

The Las Piñas Gabaldon Hall is an old school building in Las Piñas located in the campus of the Las Piñas Central Elementary School in Metro Manila, Philippines. The name "Gabaldon schools" derives from a former Nueva Ecija congressman, Isauro Gabaldon, who introduced a law in 1907 that appropriated funds for the construction of school buildings nationwide.

When the Americans arrived in the 19th century, one of their primary goals was the establishment of the education system in the Philippines, and they created the Department of Education to accomplish this goal. The American colonists used the institution of the educational system to teach the Filipinos how to speak English, making the transmission of American values easier. This was also done under the auspices of preparing the Philippines, then just emerging from the aftermath of World War II, for independence.

One of the first delegations of American educators who rose to prominence in the Philippines arrived on a ship called the "Thomas," which is the reason that the American teachers became known as the Thomasites.

== History ==
=== Context of Gabaldon Schools in the Philippines ===
The Americans decided that more public schools must be provided to facilitate the institutional education of the Filipinos. There were already an existing 534 schools constructed by the Spaniards, and the Americans added 1000 more schools, a number that steadily grew in the first 10 years of American occupation. The adopted three kinds of school buildings: the barrio school, the municipal school, and high school buildings.

Starting 1900s, they built sturdier schoolhouses that later became known as American Colonial Schools. American architect William E. Parsons was commissioned to develop prototype designs for the schoolhouses for both elementary and high school. There were twenty prototypes made that varied from one classroom to more than ten classrooms.

In 1907, assemblyman Isauro Gabaldon allotted a budget of one million pesos (sixty thousand dollars) for the construction of these prototypes all over the Philippines. These schools were later known as "Gabaldon Schools".

== Description ==
=== Site ===
With the growth of population in Las Piñas, the demand for education also began rising. Starting out from a single Gabaldon school, the movement led to the construction of several buildings and facilities within the complex. The site includes multi-storey classroom buildings, a health education building, guard houses, service areas, and additional offices, as well as an athletic track and a multi purpose hall.

=== Architectural characteristics ===
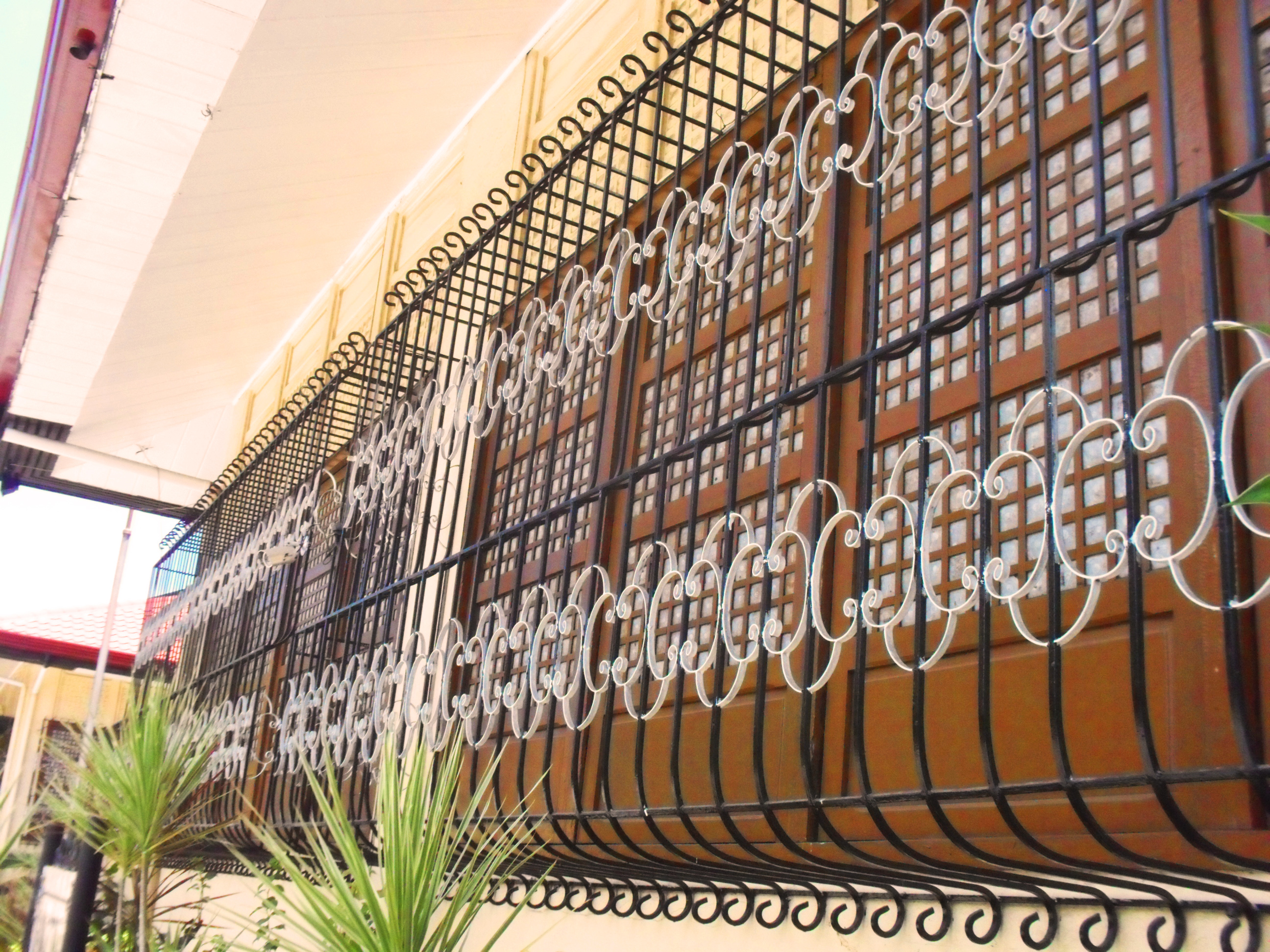
Capiz windows with grills

Reminiscent of the early years of the American occupation, Las Piñas Elementary School's Gabaldon Hall is one of the survivors of the city's rapid urbanisation.

The Las Piñas Gabaldon Hall reflects a neoclassical architecture style. This is observable in its U-shaped configuration, the series of concrete columns in the middle section, and the use of standardized G.I roofing. It belongs to one of the construction systems employed in Gabaldon Schools – the reinforced concrete built-in wall system. It has a medium aesthetic value; and medium state of originality.

It also features high ceilings, and windows with capiz-shell panes. The roof reflects Dutch gable roof design – similar to other types of Gabaldon schools. The windows are in sliding-type style, and the transom supplements ample lighting into the interior. The windows were made fixed and enclosed with wrought iron grill works while the transoms (including wood framing and capiz shells) were painted along with the walls of the hall.

== Present situation ==
=== Existing building conditions ===
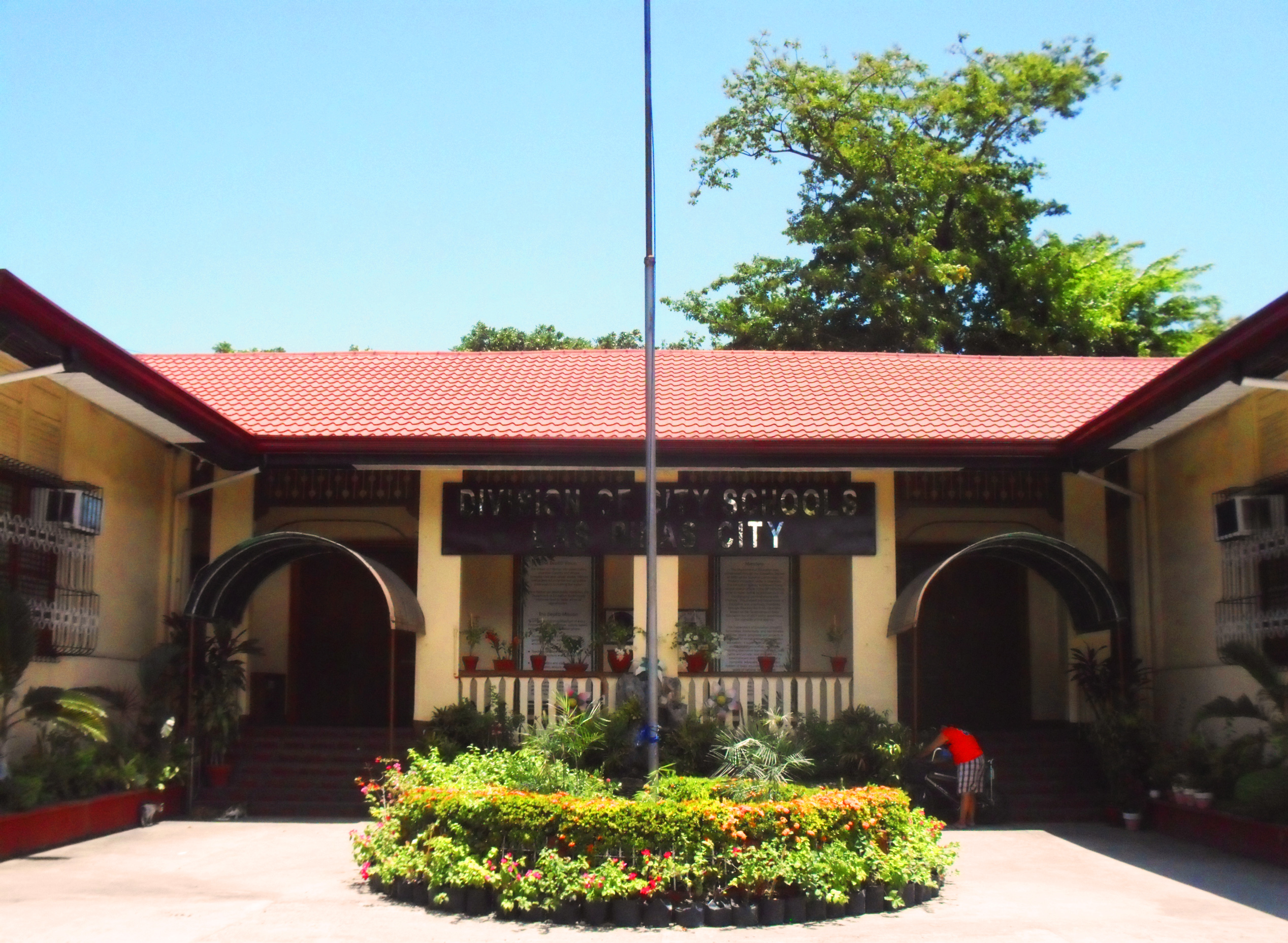
Las Piñas Gabaldon Front Facade

The Las Piñas Gabaldon Hall integrated full air-conditioning system to cater according to its new use as an office building. Also, the gap between the concrete foundations and the natural ground line were used into plant boxes. The aluminum lettering of "Division of City Schools Las Piñas City" were added at the front facade. Also, green polycarbonate curved roofing were installed within the two entrances of the hall to provide shading.

The exposed pipe systems are still present and functioning. The G.I roofing and gutters have been changed. The eaves, as well as the walls, received general painting works for aesthetic and functional improvement. The original extension walls were made out of wood and replaced with concrete at some time.

Other replacements include fixed jalousies on the sides of the hall, new ceilings, fixed cement partitions (collapsible wooden partitions before), and clay and wood tiles.

=== Division of City Schools Las Piñas ===
The Division of City Schools, Las Piñas was established as one of the thirteen divisions of DECS – National Capital Region. It was formally opened on July 2, 1997, with the grant of cityhood to the former town of Las Piñas. Pursuant to Section 44 of the Las Piñas Charter, otherwise known as Republic Act No. 8251, the City Schools Division was officially created and was officially separated from the Division of Parañaque – Las Piñas (PARLAS) during a formal turnover ceremony held on June 27, 1997.

Maintaining the over-all administration and supervision of elementary and secondary or basic education at the division level is the promotional or supervisory staff headed by Ms. Virginia L. Peñafuerte as its City Schools Division Superintendent who is ably supported by Dr. Lourdes M. Victoriano as its Assistant Schools Division Superintendent.

== Gallery ==
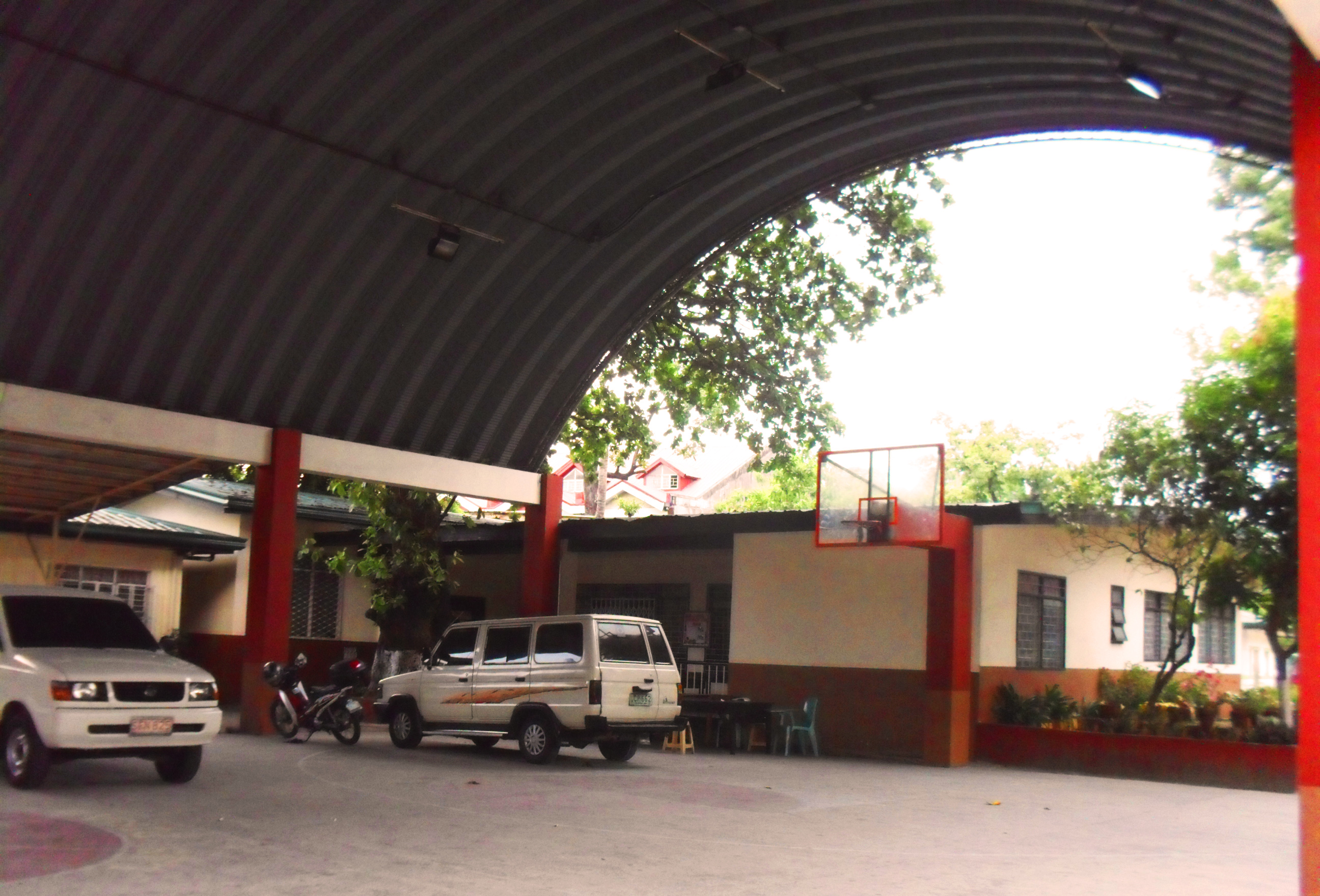
Basketball Court at Las Piñas Elementary School Central

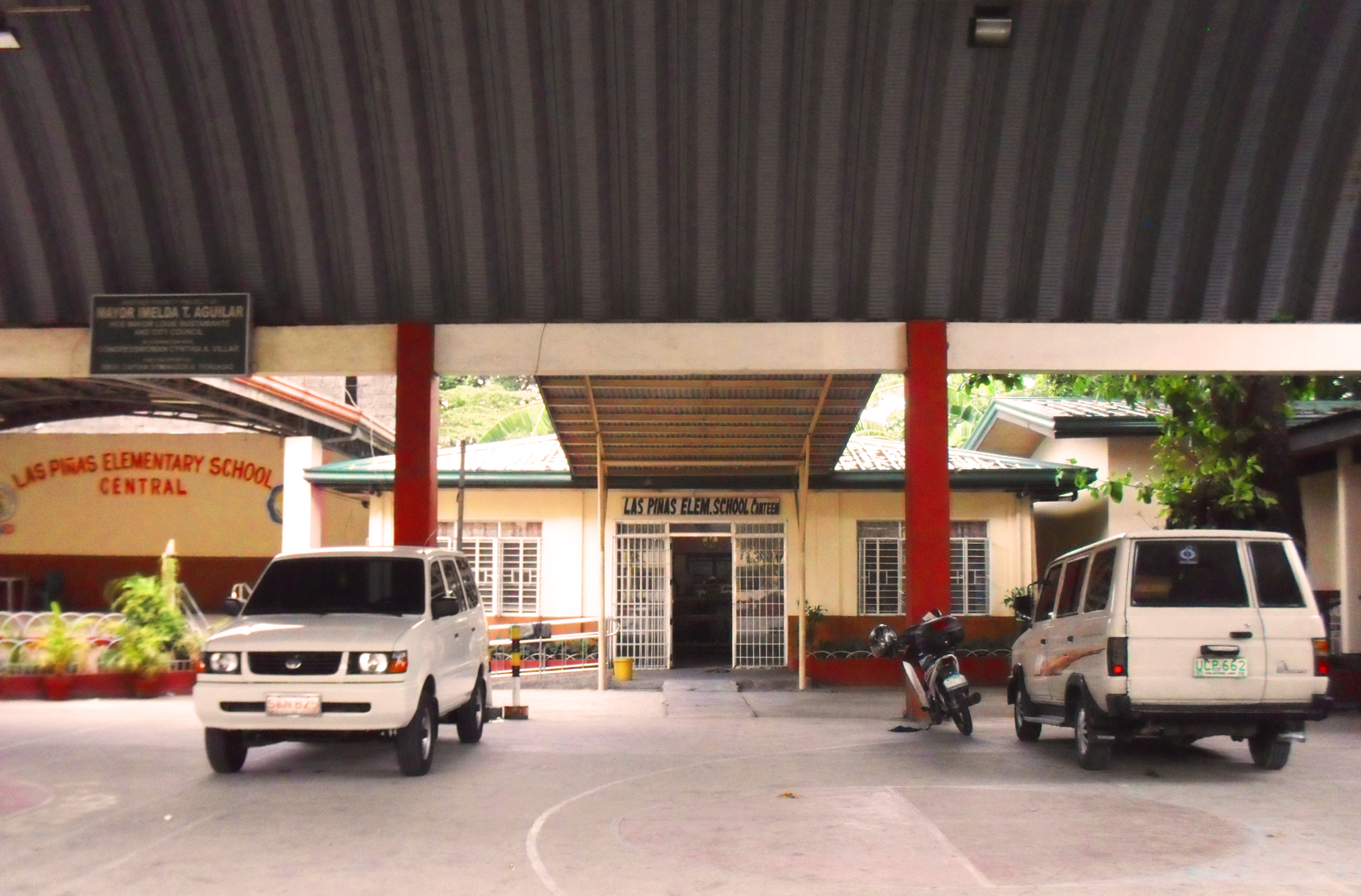
Canteen at Las Piñas Elementary School Central

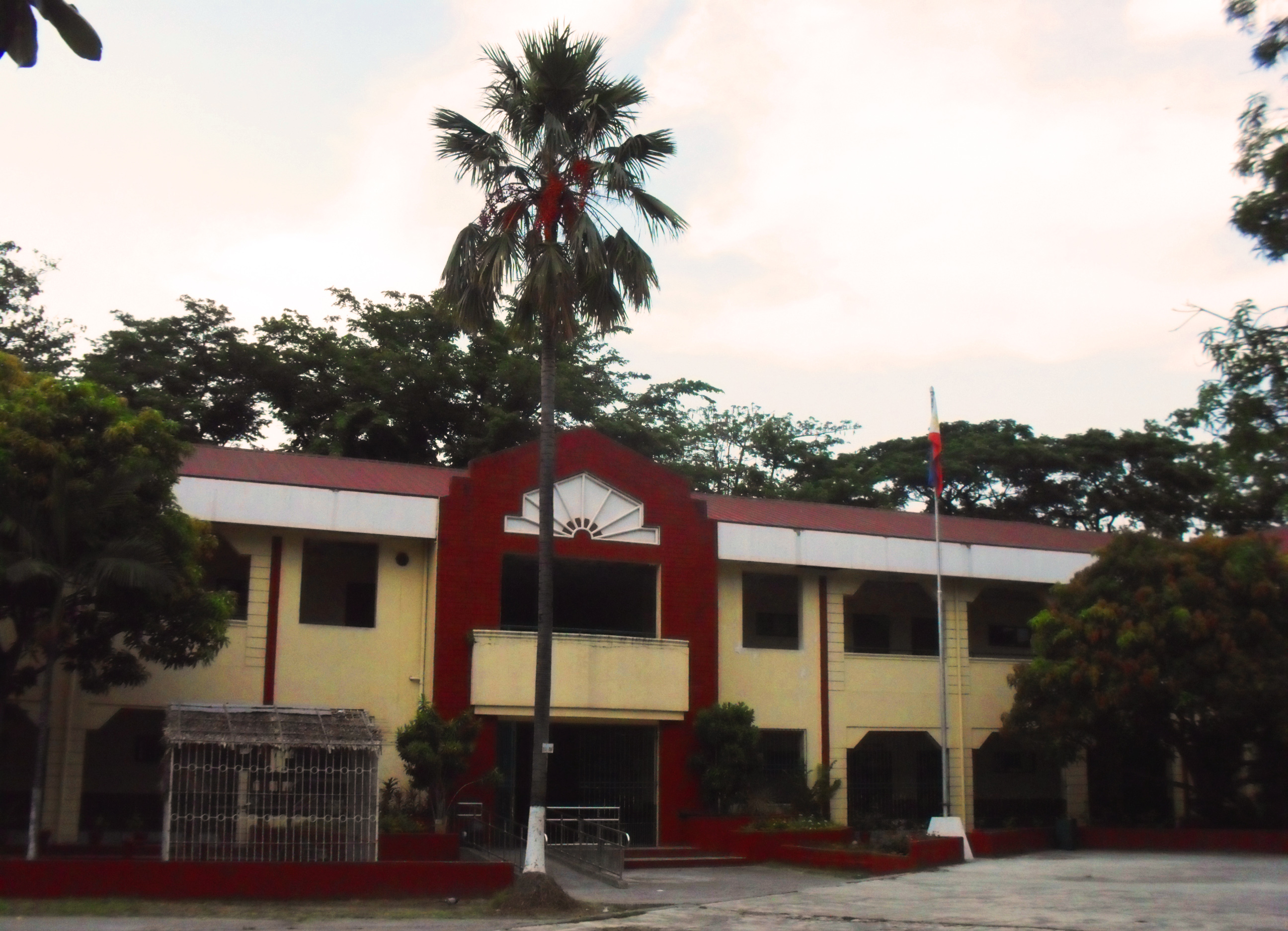
Front Facade of Las Piñas Elementary School Central

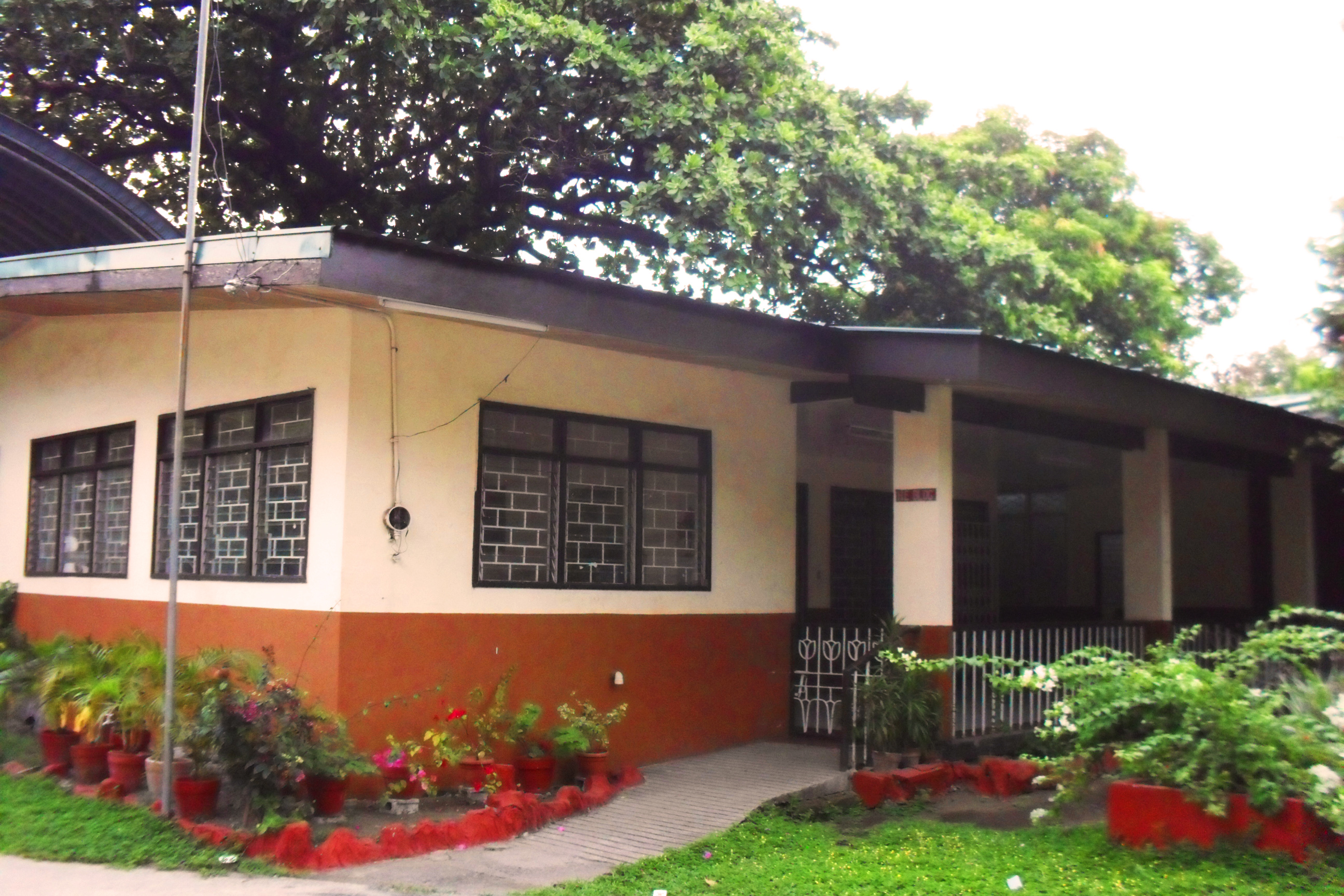
HE Building at Las Piñas Elementary School Central

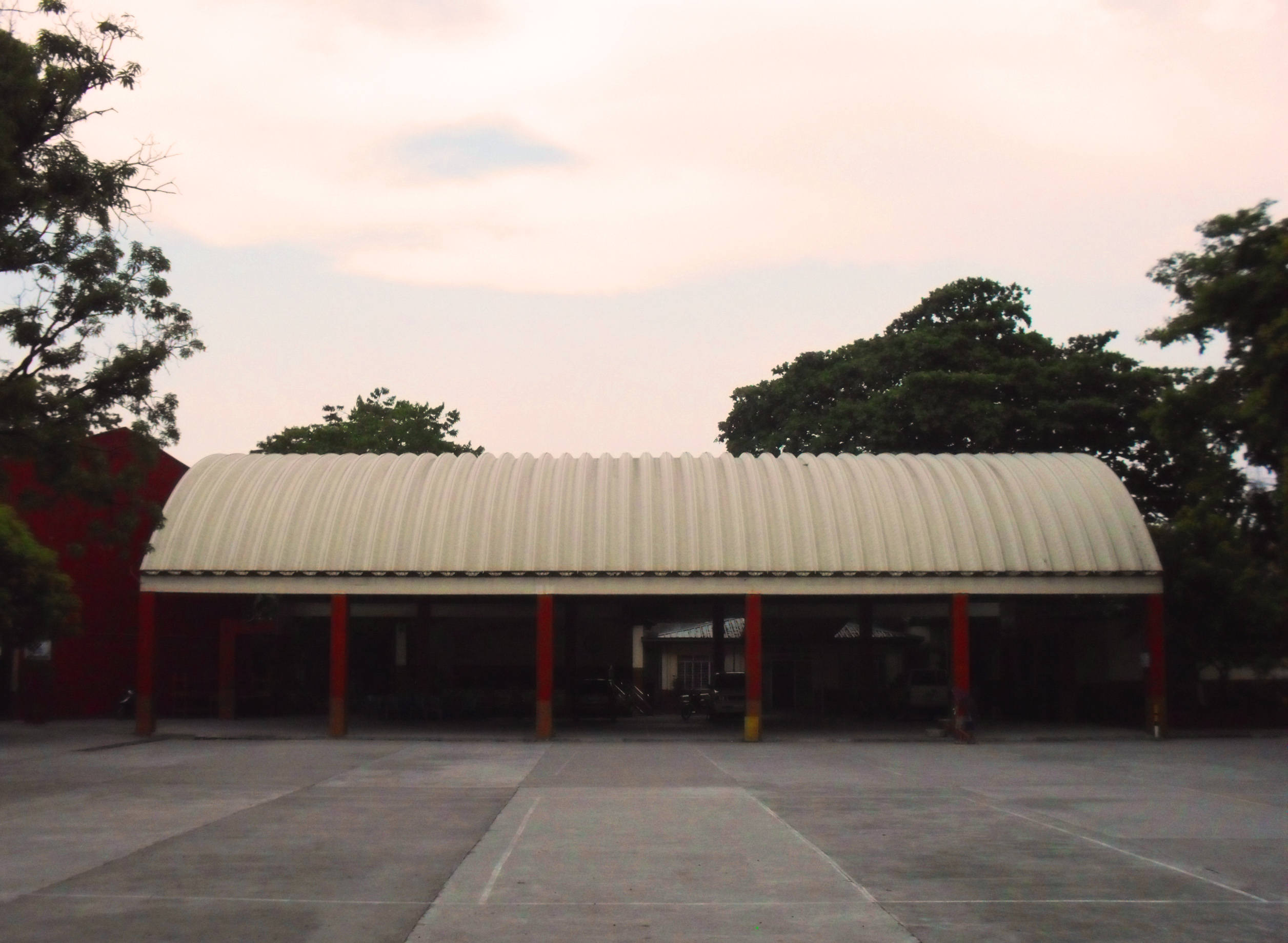
Multi-Purpose Hall of Las Piñas Elementary School Central

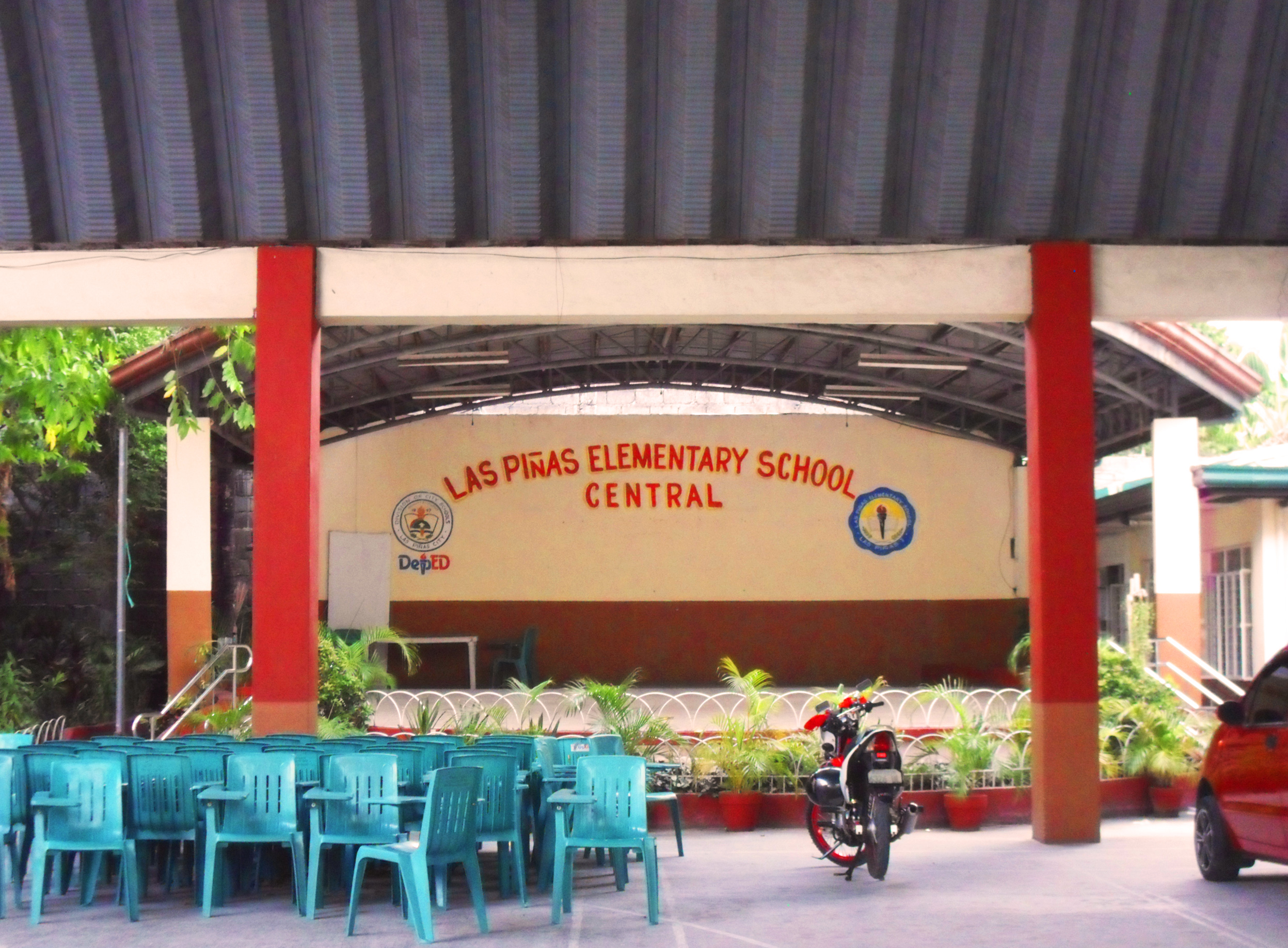
Stage at Las Piñas Elementary School Central

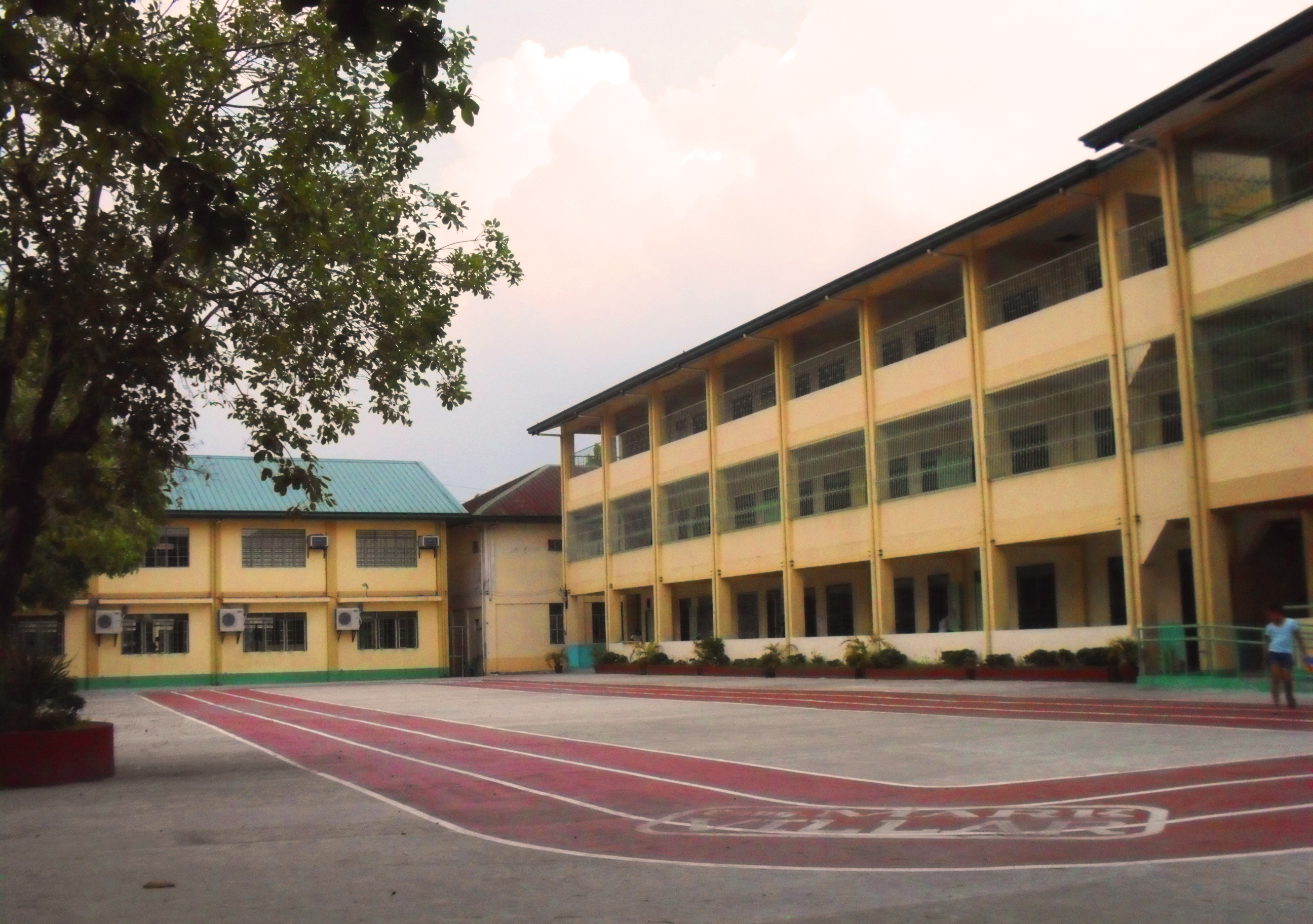
Track Oval at Las Piñas Elementary School Central

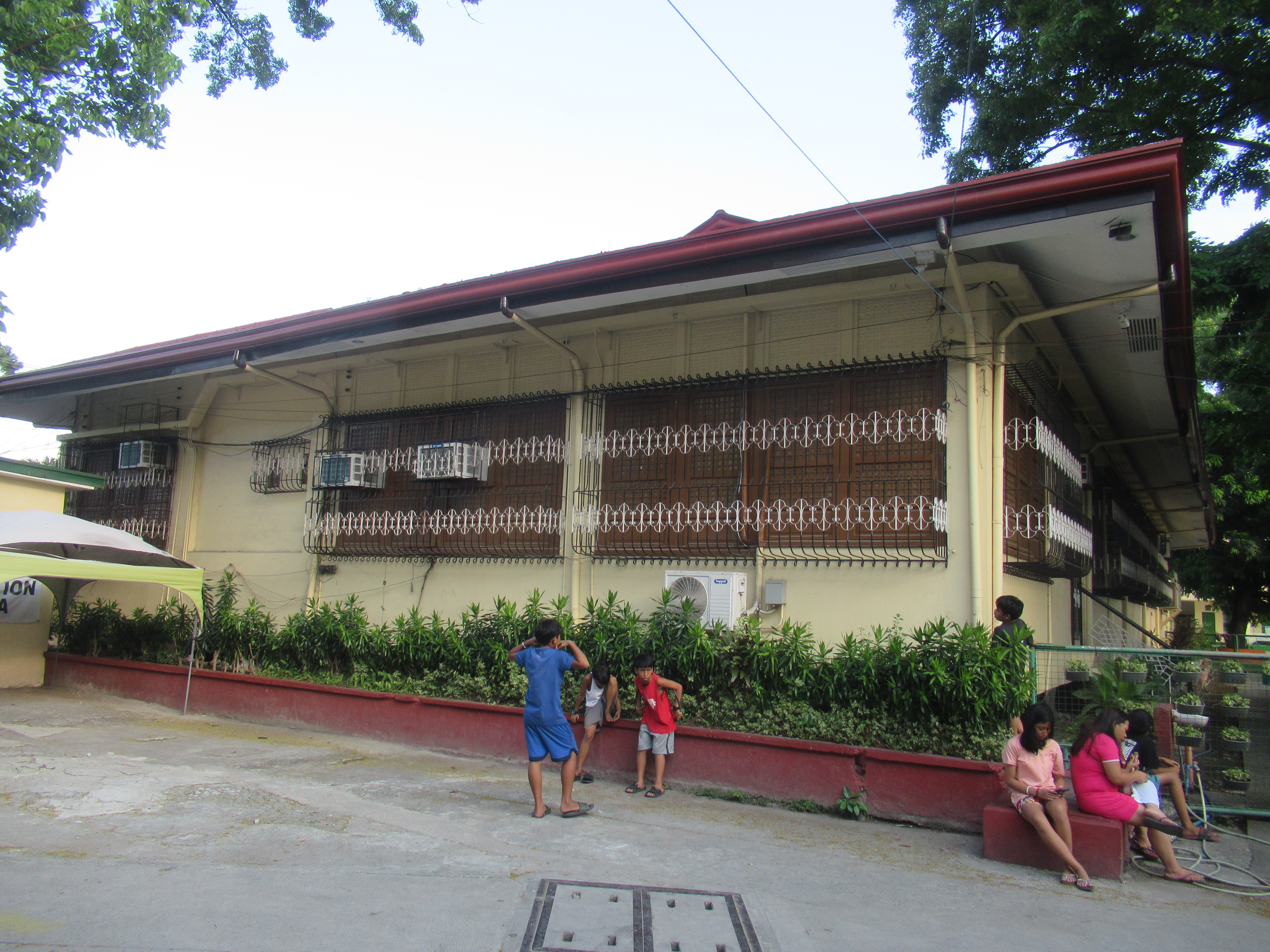
Las Piñas Elementary Special Science School - Alternative learning System and Training Center

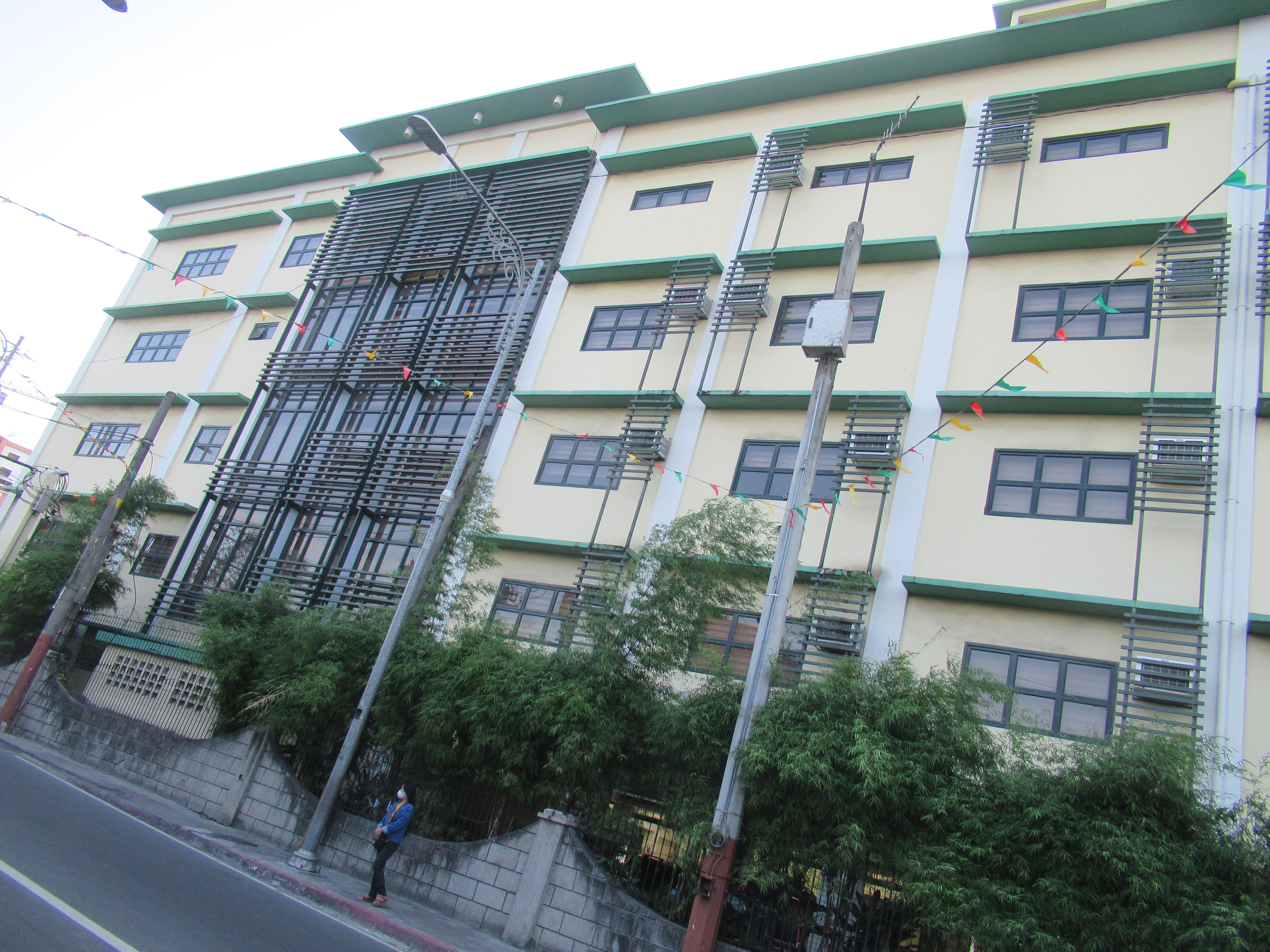
Alternative learning System and Training Center Las Piñas Gabaldon Hall Division of City Schools Las Piñas
