= Casa Gorordo Museum =

Heritage house museum in Cebu City, Philippines

- Balay nga Tisa
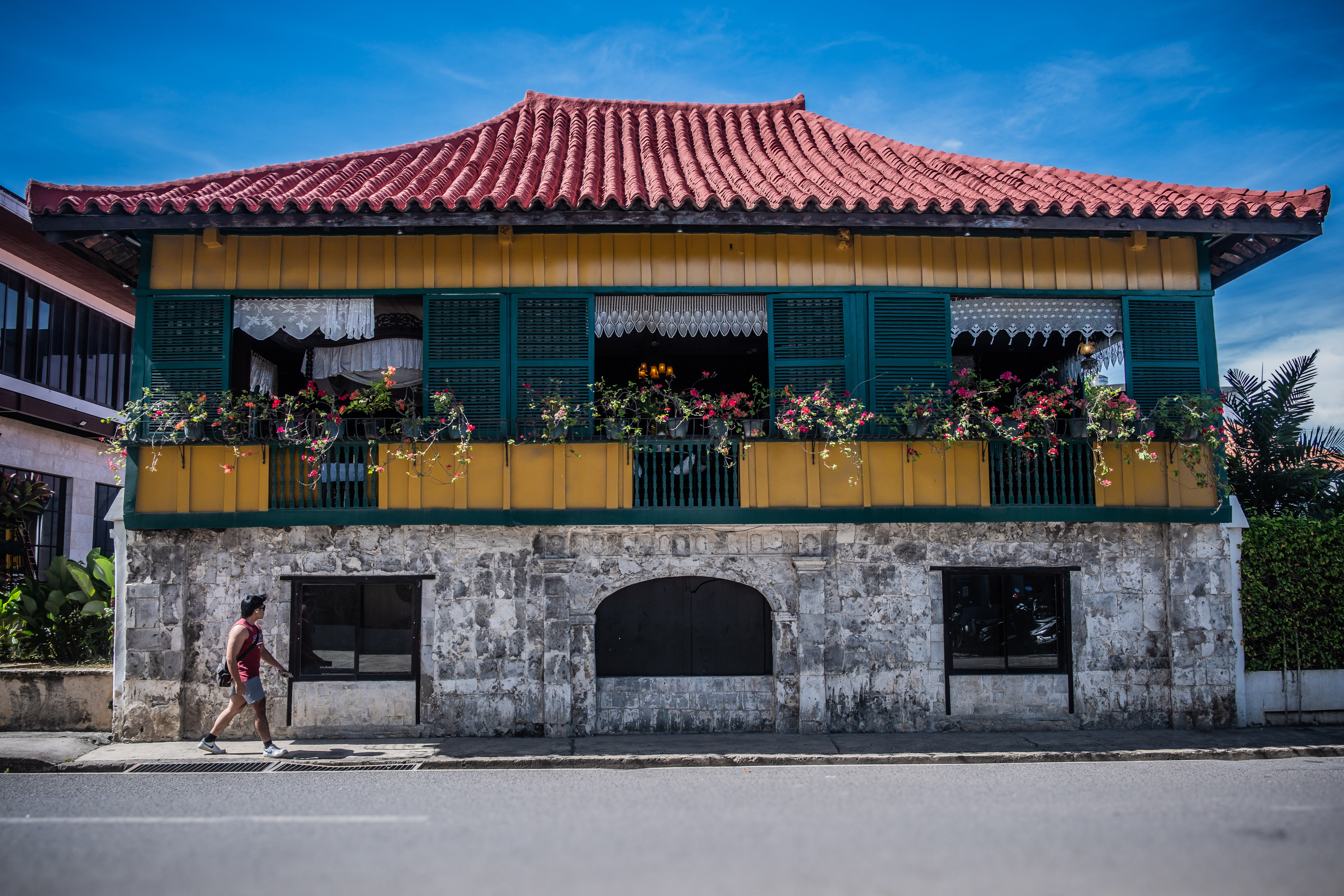
- Casa Gorordo Museum in 2024

General information
- Type: House museum and National Historical Landmark
- Location: 35 Eduardo Aboitiz St, Parian, Cebu City, Philippines
- Coordinates: 10.301°N 123.905°E
- Owner: Ramon Aboitiz Foundation Inc. (RAFI)

Technical details
- Floor count: 2

Website
- www.casagorordomuseum.org

The Casa Gorordo Museum is a historic heritage house museum located in the Parian district of Cebu City, Philippines. Constructed in the 1850s, the structure encapsulates the 19th and early 20th-century domestic lifestyle of elite families in Cebu. The residence is was the home of Juan Gorordo, the first native Filipino bishop of Cebu. The museum is currently owned and operated by the Culture and Heritage Unit of the Ramon Aboitiz Foundation Inc. (RAFI).

== History ==
An archaeological excavation suggests that Casa Gorordo was built in a reclaimed marshland. The residence was built in the 1850s by Alejandro Reynes y Rosales in the old Parian district. Four generations of the Gorordo family subsequently inhabited the house.

During World War II, the house escaped structural damage while much of Cebu City was destroyed. This preservation occurred because the Japanese Imperial Army requisitioned the building to serve as an officers' club.

RAFI acquired the property from the family in 1979. Following an extensive period of restoration, it opened to the public as Cebu's first public museum in December 1983.

== Architecture ==
The museum structure is a classic regional example of a balay nga tisa ("house with a tiled roof"). The design incorporates a combination of native Filipino, Spanish colonial, and Chinese structural and aesthetic influences.

== Exhibits and Institutional Extensions ==
Following its post-pandemic reopening, the museum compound underwent spatial reconfigurations to streamline visitor traffic. The property complex integrates artistic, commercial, and educational extensions managed by RAFI within the museum compound:

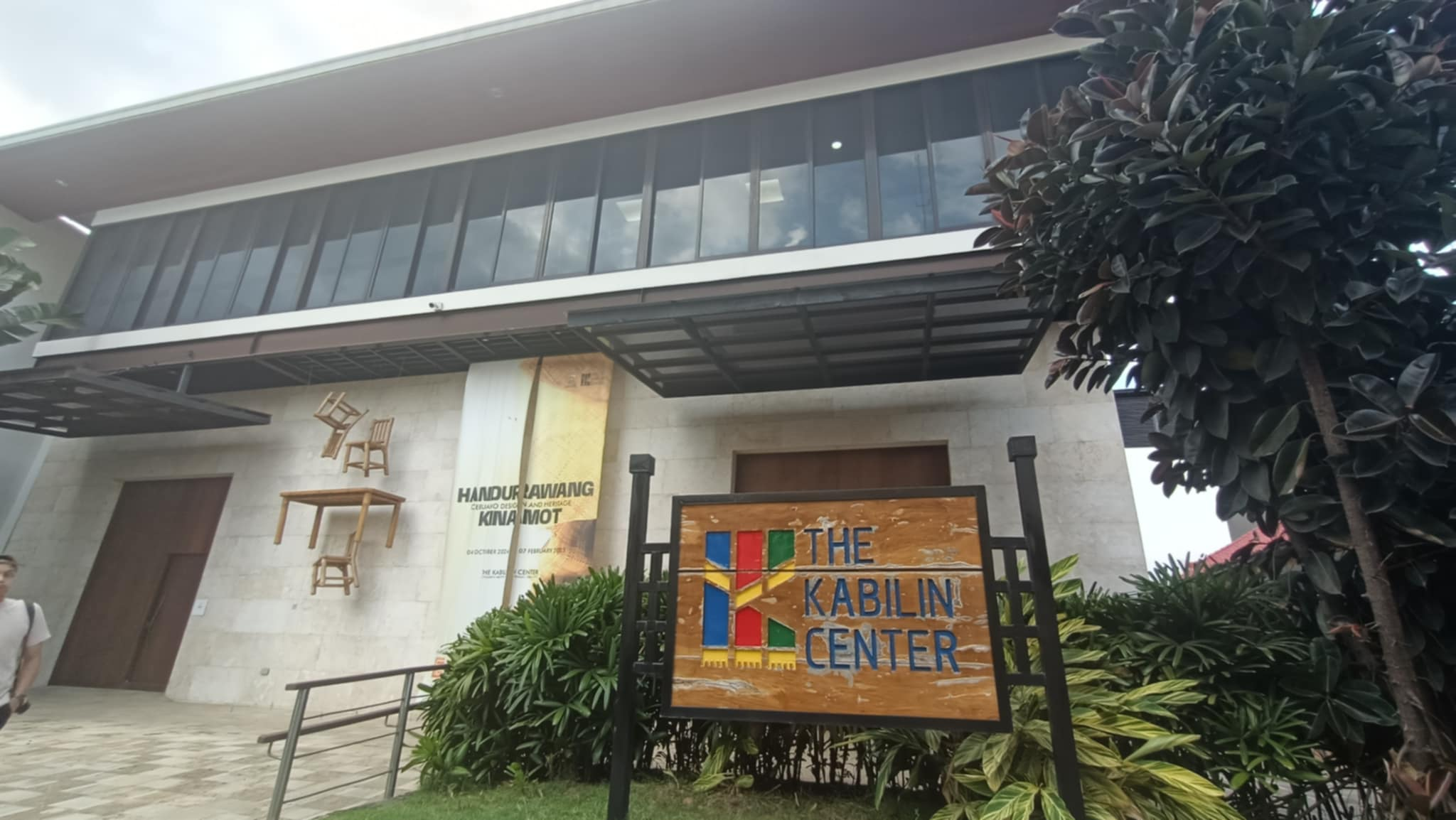
Kabilin Center, adjacent to Casa Gorordo Museum

- The Kabilin Center: Located adjacent to the main heritage house, the center serves as a cultural hub.
- Commercial Spaces: The complex features an on-site gift shop. The courtyard cafe space operates in partnership with national coffee chains, including Bo's Coffee.
