= Casa Manila =

Museum in Manila, Philippines

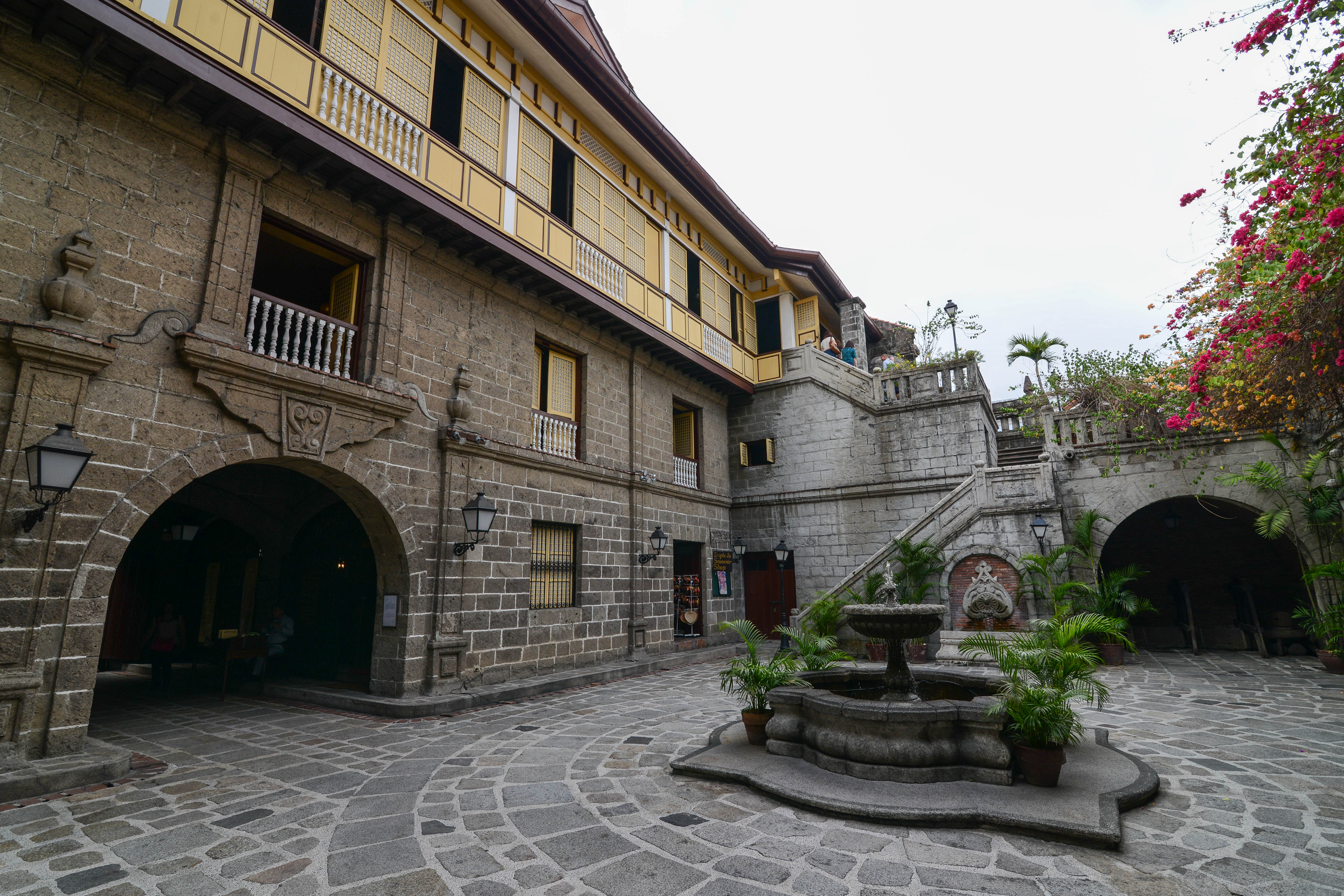
- Coordinates: 14°35′23″N 120°58′31″E
- Type: History museum
- Director: Guiller Asido
- Curator: Ramil B. Tibayan
- Building details
- Location in Manila Location in Metro Manila Location in Luzon Location in the Philippines

General information
- Status: Completed
- Type: Mansion
- Architectural style: Filipino Colonial (Bahay na Bato)
- Location: Intramuros, Manila
- Completed: 1980s

Technical details
- Floor count: 3

Design and construction
- Architect: Ramon Faustmann

Casa Manila is a museum in Intramuros depicting a colonial lifestyle during the Spanish colonization of the Philippines.

The museum part is an imposing stone-and-wood structure, built c. 1850, one of three grand houses in Barrio San Luis (one of the four original villages of Intramuros) and located across the historic San Agustin Church and bounded by Calle Real, General Luna, Cabildo and Urdaneta streets. The other two grand houses in the barrio are the Los Hidalgos, c. 1650, and Cuyugan Mansion, c. 1890.

Casa Manila is a copy of the 1850s San Nicolas House that was once located in Calle Jaboneros. The architect of Casa Manila was J. Ramon L. Faustmann. It was reconstructed by Imelda Marcos during the 1980s, modeled on Spanish colonial architecture.

== See also ==
- List of most visited art museums in the world
- List of museums in the Philippines
- International Council of Museums
- International Museum Day (May 18)
- Museum education
- Virtual Library museums pages
