= The Other Side of Aspen =

1978 American gay pornographic film

- Film title card
- Directed by: Matt Sterling (Note: Credited as Bill Clayton, a pseudonym used by multiple directors at Falcon.)
- Screenplay by: Matt Sterling
- Produced by: Chuck Holmes
- Starring: Casey Donovan; Al Parker; Dick Fisk
- Production company: Falcon Studios
- Distributed by: Falcon Studios
- Release date: November 1978
- Running time: 39 minutes
- Country: United States
- Language: English

The Other Side of Aspen is a 1978 American gay pornographic film produced by Falcon Studios, directed by Matt Sterling, starring Casey Donovan, Al Parker, and Dick Fisk. The film consists of sex scenes filmed in Lake Tahoe, California, interspersed with dialogue scenes shot in San Francisco. The Other Side of Aspen was Falcon's first feature-length release, notable as one of the first adult films distributed on videocassette.

The film was a critical and commercial success upon release, and marked a turning point in the development of the gay pornography industry. Its elevated production values, largely unprecedented at the time, led to feature film-style releases becoming the norm across the gay pornography industry. The film popularized a macho gay porn aesthetic that would remain broadly popular for decades after the film's release.

== Plot ==
In San Francisco, a skiing instructor (Jeff Turk) recounts to his friend (Mike Flynn) a particular incident that occurred during his recent visit to Aspen, Colorado. While traveling to instruct two clients (Al Parker and Casey Donovan), he witnessed two men (Chad Benson and Dick Fisk) having sex in a cabin. Upon arriving at his destination, he found his clients also having sex; they are subsequently joined by the men from the cabin and the instructor in an orgy. Having recounted the story, the instructor comments that he is aroused; he exposes his penis to his friend, who reaches for it.

== Cast ==
- Casey Donovan
- Al Parker
- Dick Fisk
- Chad Benson
- Jeff Turk
- Mike Flynn

Cast sourced from the Gay Erotic Video Index.

== Production ==
=== Development ===
Chuck Holmes founded Falcon Studios in 1972, launching the company by purchasing three short gay pornography films by director Matt Sterling and an adult mailing list for USD$4,200. The founding of Falcon as a pornography company that conducted business primarily through mail order was a reflection of the emerging home video market, which provided the conditions for the commercialization and professionalization of the gay pornography industry through the establishment of a studio system that would come to dominate the production and distribution of gay pornography from the mid-1970s onward. Falcon's first release, the 1972 short film Johnny Harden and the Champs, defined the studio's aesthetic of "down-to-earth men" with "naturally athletic bodies" that would recur in many of the studio's subsequent films.

In fall 1977, Falcon cameraman Colin Meyer suggested to Holmes that the studio produce a film with "all the biggest porn icons at that time": Casey Donovan, the star of Boys in the Sand (1971) and the first ever gay porn star; Al Parker, a popular model at Falcon rival Colt Studios who had appeared in several Falcon films; and the up-and-coming Dick Fisk. The film was marketed as the first release in the Falcon Video Pac line, with the title The Other Side of Aspen chosen after a staffer at Falcon suggested making "a movie in the snow."

=== Filming ===
The Other Side of Aspen's skiing and sex scenes were shot in Lake Tahoe, California. Holmes regularly took skiing trips, and filmed scenes for the studio on one such trip so he could claim the vacation as a write-off. The film's setting of Aspen, Colorado references the city's popularity as a destination for LGBT tourists; in 1979, the city was the first municipality in Colorado to pass a non-discrimination ordinance, and has hosted Aspen Gay Ski Week annually since that same year.

At the time, gay pornographic films were typically eight- to 10-minute single-scene film loops that were shot and released individually on 8 mm film; The Other Side of Aspen was similarly shot as four individual scenes. After filming concluded in Lake Tahoe, Holmes, Sterling, and Falcon co-founder Vaughn Kincey elected to shoot additional scenes of dialogue in San Francisco. The dialogue scenes were edited between the sex scenes (an industry practice now referred to as "webbing"), giving the film a narrative with plot and continuity, and making The Other Side of Aspen the first feature film to be released by Falcon.

Donovan and Parker met for the first time while flying to Lake Tahoe to shoot the film. The film's first sex scene between Donovan and Parker was improvised; the encounter was filmed after the actors began to have sex of their own accord during a still photography session. During the encounter, Parker fisted Donavan; this was cut from the film's original 1978 release, but was included in its 2002 re-release. After filming concluded, Fisk and Benson pursued a romantic relationship.

=== Release ===
The Other Side of Aspen was heavily marketed in the lead-up to its release (an atypical approach for gay adult films at the time), with reservation cards and a brochure promoting the film sent to the top customers on Falcon's mailing list. The film would be released in all extant media formats of the time: standard 8 mm, Super 8, Sound 8, VHS, and Betamax, making The Other Side of Aspen one of the first adult films to be released on videocassette. The film was re-released on DVD in 2001, making it the first film Falcon Studios released on DVD; John Holmes notes that Falcon was a late adopter of the DVD format, as the studio was "especially cautious about the commercial viability" of the medium. A remastered version of the film was released in 2014.

== Reception and legacy ==
=== Critical and commercial response ===
The Other Side of Aspen was a major critical and commercial success upon its release, and was described by the TLA Entertainment Group as "one of the best gay adult films ever made." Alternative pornography director Black Spark has commented positively on The Other Side of Aspen, describing the nostalgic qualities of film favorably in comparison to "boring" contemporary mainstream pornography. A short documentary about the film, Another Side of Aspen, was produced by Falcon in 2011 to promote the release of The Other Side of Aspen VI. The documentary is directed by Michael Stabile, shot by Ben Leon, and produced by Jack Shamama; footage from the documentary was later used in Stabile's 2015 feature-length documentary film Seed Money: The Chuck Holmes Story.

By 1993, 45,000 copies of The Other Side of Aspen had been sold, making it the best-selling gay pornography film at that time and producing the highest revenues in Falcon's corporate history up to that point. Its success prompted Falcon to release their back catalog of over 200 film loops on home video in the years subsequent to the film's release, as well as produce new material exclusively on home video. Falcon was thus uniquely positioned to exploit the home video market in a way its competitors were not, with John R. Burger noting that "film-to-videotape transfer and the subsequent packaging, marketing, and distribution of video is a costly procedure. Unable to compete in this new marketplace, many companies went out of business."

In 2002, the film's re-release won Best Classic Gay DVD at the GayVN Awards, and Best Classic Video at the Grabby Awards.

=== Impact ===
The Other Side of Aspen is regarded as a turning point for the development of gay pornography as a genre and industry: its elevated production values were largely unprecedented at the time, and feature film-style releases would become the norm across the gay pornography industry in the wake of The Other Side of Aspen's success. The film cemented the legacy of Donovan and Parker, with writer Jeffrey Escoffier noting that the film "put Donovan back into the spotlight and confirmed Parker's celestial status."

The film is credited with popularizing the macho gay porn star aesthetic that would remain broadly popular in the decades subsequent to the film's release, which Holmes described as his response to the "scummy" look of stag films of the 1960s. Escoffier writes that The Other Side of Aspen "crystallized Chuck Holmes' vision of the erotic movie [...] it signaled the culmination of the gay macho sexual ethos, the confirmation of the ideal gay male body–young, a swimmer's build, no tattoos, and little hair–and the codification of gay porn movies as a genre." Mercer concurs, noting:

Holmes' creative ambition, famously, was little more than to produce porn featuring performers with clean feet. This apparent modesty belies the extent to which his personal vision would inform the commercial and aesthetic direction that Falcon Studios would take and much of his competitors would subsequently follow: towards an increasing emphasis on a vision of 'cleanliness', professional production values, a polished, generic, aesthetic, and homogeneity in output.

The aesthetics of The Other Side of Aspen are further examined by Lynda Johnston, who notes that the setting of an exclusive ski resort "laden with signifiers of wealth" furthers emphasizes this polished and professional tone. Whitney Strub similarly argues that The Other Side of Aspen was "a harbinger of gay hardcore's emerging dominant modality," as the genre moved away from fetishistic material typical of the early- to mid-1970s, and towards "soft stylization" and "a more standardized masculinity." Strub notes how the removal of the fisting scene from The Other Side of Aspen was part of a broader effort by Falcon beginning in the 1980s to pivot away from the fetish and kink videos it produced in the early 1970s; the company began to de-emphasize this content it its mail order catalogs before removing it entirely, a trend Strub notes was later exacerbated by "moralistic New Right bigotry" and "its internalized echoes in the scapegoating of leather, kink, and fisting communities" in the wake of the HIV/AIDS epidemic.

== Sequels ==
A total of five sequels to The Other Side of Aspen have been produced by Falcon, and often star the most popular performers of the film's given era. Michael Joseph Gross argues that the franchise has gone "mostly downhill", as "Falcon's ideal of male beauty has become transparently crafted" with "bodies that look increasing fictional," in contrast to the naturalistic appearance of the actors in the original 1978 film.

- The Other Side of Aspen II (1985), directed by Matt Sterling
- The Other Side of Aspen III: Snowbound (1995), directed by John Rutherford
- The Other Side of Aspen IV: The Rescue (1995), directed by John Rutherford
- The Other Side of Aspen V (2001), directed by John Rutherford
- The Other Side of Aspen VI (2011), directed by Chris Ward
