= Rita Moreno on screen and stage =

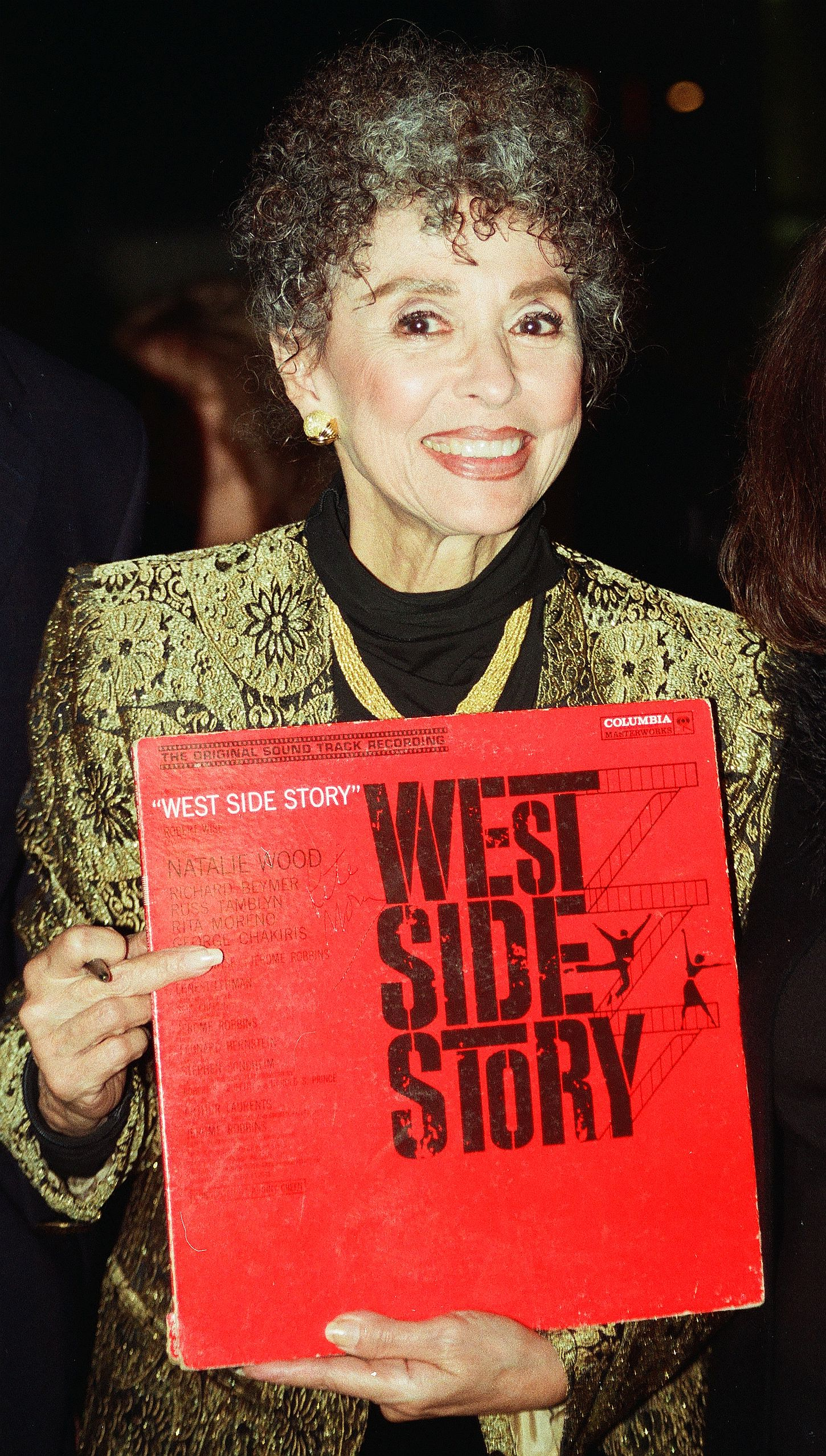
Moreno in 2000

Rita Moreno is a Puerto Rican actress, dancer, and singer. Throughout her career spanning over 80 years, she has appeared in numerous film, television, and theater projects. Moreno's notable acting work includes supporting roles in the golden age of Hollywood musical films Singin' in the Rain (1952), The King and I (1956) and West Side Story (1961). She continued acting in films such as Popi (1969), Carnal Knowledge (1971), The Four Seasons (1981), I Like It Like That (1994) and the cult film Slums of Beverly Hills (1998). In 2021, she played Valentina in Steven Spielberg's film adaptation of West Side Story.

She is also known for her work on the children's television series The Electric Company (1971–1977) as well as a supporting role as Sister Peter Marie Reimondo on the HBO series Oz (1997–2003). She voiced the titular role of Carmen Sandiego in Where on Earth Is Carmen Sandiego? from 1994 to 1999. From 2017 to 2020, she portrayed the role of the matriarch Lydia Margarita del Carmen Inclán Maribona Leyte-Vidal de Riera in the 2017 remake of One Day at a Time. For theater, she is best known for her role as Googie Gomez in The Ritz for which she received a Tony Award. She also starred in a female revival of The Odd Couple (1985–86) alongside Sally Struthers and Tony Shalhoub.

== Film ==
Key
†	Denotes films that have not yet been released

Year	Title	Role	Notes	Ref.
1950	So Young, So Bad	Dolores Guererro	Credited as Rosita Moreno	
1950	The Toast of New Orleans	Tina		
1950	Pagan Love Song	Terru		
1952	The Ring	Lucy Gomez		
1952	Singin' in the Rain	Zelda Zanders		
1952	The Fabulous Senorita	Manuela Rodríguez		
1952	Cattle Town	Queli		
1953	Fort Vengeance	Bridget Fitzgibbon		
1953	Ma and Pa Kettle on Vacation	Soubrette	Uncredited	
1953	Latin Lovers	Christina		
1953	El Alamein	Jara		
1954	Jivaro	Maroa		
1954	The Yellow Tomahawk	Honey Bear		
1954	Garden of Evil	Cantina Singer		
1955	Untamed	Julia		
1955	Seven Cities of Gold	Ula		
1956	The Lieutenant Wore Skirts	Sandra Roberts		
1956	The King and I	Tuptim		
1956	The Vagabond King	Huguette		
1957	The Deerslayer	Hetty Hutter		
1960	This Rebel Breed	Lola Montalvo		
1961	West Side Story	Anita		
1961	Summer and Smoke	Rosa Zacharias		
1963	Cry of Battle	Sisa		
1968	The Night of the Following Day	Vi		
1969	Popi	Lupe		
1969	Marlowe	Dolores Gonzáles		
1971	Carnal Knowledge	Louise		
1976	The Ritz	Googie Gomez		
1977	Voodoo Passion			
1978	The Boss' Son	Esther Rose		
1980	Happy Birthday, Gemini	Lucille		
1981	The Four Seasons	Claudia Zimmer		
1991	Age Isn't Everything	Rita		
1993	Italian Movie	Isabella		
1994	I Like It Like That	Rosaria Linares		
1995	Carmen Miranda: Bananas is My Business	Herself	Documentary	
1995	Angus	Madame Rulenska		
1998	Slums of Beverly Hills	Belle Abromowitz		
1999	Carlo's Wake	Angela Torello		
1999	The Puerto Ricans: Our American Story	Herself	Documentary	
2000	Blue Moon	Maggie		
2001	Piñero	Miguel's Mother		
2003	Casa de los Babys	Señora Muñoz		
2003	Scooby-Doo! and the Monster of Mexico	Dona Dolores / Woman No. 3	Voice	
2003	Beyond Borders: John Sayles in Mexico	Herself	Documentary	
2004	King of the Corner	Inez		
2006	Play It By Ear	Ruth		
2014	Rio 2	Mimi	Voice	
2014	Six Dance Lessons in Six Weeks	Ida Barks		
2016	Remember Me	Gloria Sachs		
2021	Rita Moreno: Just a Girl Who Decided to Go for It	Herself	Documentary	
2021	Curious George: Cape Ahoy	Gertrude St. John	Voice	
2021	West Side Story	Valentina	Also executive producer	
2022	The Prank	Mrs. Wheeler		
2022	My Father's Dragon	Mrs. McClaren	Voice	
2023	80 for Brady	Maura		
2023	Fast X	Abuelita Toretto		
2023	Family Switch	Angelica		

Source: Internet Movie Database & Turner Classic Movies

== Television ==
Year	Title	Role	Notes	Ref.
1952	Fireside Theatre	Various	2 episodes	
1952	China Smith	Mariaman	Episode: "The Bamboo Coffin"	
1952	Schlitz Playhouse	Lit-Lit	Episode: "The Marriage of Lit-Lit"	
1953–59	General Electric Theater	Various	2 episodes	
1954	Where's Raymond?		Episode: "Pilot"	
1954	The Ford Television Theatre	Serene Crane	Episode: "Wonderful Day for a Wedding"	
1954	Cavalcade of America		Episode: "Cat with the Crimson Eyes"	
1956	The 20th Century Fox Hour	Sonseeahray	Episode: "Broken Arrow"	
1956–58	Climax!	Various	4 episodes	
1957	Matinee Theatre		Episode: "The Daughter of Mata Hari"	
1958	The Red Skelton Hour	Senorita Delores	Episode: "Clem the Bullfighter"	
1958	Father Knows Best	Chanthini	Episode: "Fair Exchange" (November 24, 1958)	
1959	Tales of Wells Fargo	Lola Montez	Episode: "Lola Montez"	
1959	Trackdown	Tina	Episode: "The Samaritan"	
1959	Zane Grey Theatre	Linda	Episode: "The Last Raid"	
1959	The Millionaire	Alicia Osante	Episode: "Millionaire Alicia Osante"	
1959	Cimarron City	Elena Maria Obregon de Vega	Episode: "The Town Is a Prisoner"	
1960	Playhouse 90	Rita	Episode: "Alas, Babylon"	
1960	Bourbon Street Beat	Manuela Ruiz	Episode: "Suitable for Framing" (May 16, 1960)	
1960	Richard Diamond, Private Detective	Maria Ferrari	Episode: "Coat of Arms"	
1960	Zorro	Chulita	2 episodes	
1961	Michael Shayne	Myra	Episode: "No Shroud for Shayne"	
1961	Adventures in Paradise	Inez Sanders	Episode: "Vendetta"	
1963	Burke's Law	Margaret Cowls	Episode: "Who Killed Julian Buck?" (October 18, 1963)	
1965	Seaway	Annabelle	Episode: "The Only Good Indian"	
1965	The Trials of O'Brien	Caressa	Episode: "Dead End on Flugel Street"	
1967	Run for Your Life	Anita	Episode: "Who's Che Guevara?"	
1971–77	The Electric Company	Carmela; Otto The Director; Pandora the Little Girl; Millie the Helper	Cast member	
1973	Hec Ramsey	Lina Ramirez	Episode: "A Hard Road to Vengeance"	
1974	Dominic's Dream	Anita Bente	TV short	
1974	Medical Center	Lydia	Episode: "May God Have Mercy"	
1974	Out to Lunch	Herself / Various	TV special	
1975	Mister Rogers' Neighborhood	Herself	Episode #1399	
1976	On the Rocks	Rosa Dolores	Episode: "I'll Never Forget What's Her Name"	
1976	The Muppet Show	Herself	Episode #1.05	
1976	The Carol Burnett Show	Herself (skit player)	Episode #9.16	
1977	Lanigan's Rabbi	Millie Hillman	Episode: "Corpse of the Year"	
1977	Westside Medical	Leonor Carbajal	Episode: "The Witch of Four West"	
1978	America 2-Night	Herself	Episode: "White House Paper Shredder"	
1978–79	The Rockford Files	Rita Capkovic	3 episodes	
1979	Anatomy of a Seduction	Nina	Television film	
1979	The Muppets Go Hollywood	Herself / Host	TV special	
1981	Evita Perón	Renata Riguel	Television film	
1981	Trapper John, M.D.	Liz Boyce	Episode: "Days of Wine and Leo"	
1982–83	9 to 5	Violet Newstead	Main role	
1982	Working	Waitress	Television film	
1982	Portrait of a Showgirl	Rosella DeLeon	Television film	
1983	The Love Boat	Gladys Gordon	2 episodes	
1987	The Cosby Show	Mrs. Granger	Episode: "You Only Hurt the One You Love"	
1987	The Golden Girls	Renee Corliss	Episode: "Empty Nests"	
1989	Miami Vice	Congresswoman Madelyn Woods	Episode: "Miami Squeeze"	
1989–90	B.L. Stryker	Kimberly Baskin	2 episodes	
1991	Top of the Heap	Alixandra Stone	6 episodes	
1992	Raw Toonage	Tanya Trunk	Voice, episode: "Sheerluck Bonkers/All Potato Network/The Puck Stops Here"	
1993	Hearts Afire	Senator Rhonda Hall	Episode: "While the Thomasons Slept in the Lincoln Bedroom"	
1993	Bonkers	Tanya Trunk	Voice, 2 episodes	
1994	The Nanny	Miss Wickervich/Mrs. Stone	Episode: "The Gym Teacher"	
1994	The Larry Sanders Show	Herself	Episode: "People's Choice"	
1994	Captain Planet and the Planeteers	Ella Salvator	Voice, episode: "Disoriented Express"	
1994–98	Where on Earth Is Carmen Sandiego?	Carmen Sandiego	Voice	
1994–95	The Cosby Mysteries	Angie Corea	Main role	
1995	Burke's Law	Jackie Lodge	Episode: "Who Killed the Gadget Man?"	
1995	The Wharf Rat	Mom	Television film	
1995	Women of the House	Herself	Episode: "Women in Film"	
1995	The Magic School Bus	Dr. Carmina Skeledon	Voice, episode: "The Busasaurus"	
1997	Murphy Brown	Dr. Nancy Goldman	Episode: "Ectomy, Schmectomy"	
1997	Touched by an Angel	Amanda Revere	Episode: "The Comeback"	
1997–03	Oz	Sister Peter Marie Reimondo	Main role	
1998	The Spree	Irma Kelly	Television film	
1999	The Rockford Files: If It Bleeds... It Leads	Rita Capkovic Landale	Television film	
1999	Resurrection	Mimi	Television film	
2000	Buddy Faro		Episode: "Done Away in a Manger"	
2001	Resurrection Blvd.	Rosa	Episode: "La Visita"	
2002	American Family	Juana	2 episodes	
2003	Strong Medicine	Lydia	Episode: "Degeneration"	
2003	The Guardian	Caroline Novak	3 episodes	
2003	The Handler	Danielle Isabella	Episode: "Off the Edge"	
2004	Copshop	Mary Alice	Television film	
2005	Law & Order: Special Victims Unit	Mildred Quintana	Episode: "Night"	
2005	Law & Order: Trial by Jury	Mildred Quintana	Episode: "Day"	
2005	Wanted	Mrs. Kelly	Episode: "Click, Click, Boom"	
2006–07	Law & Order: Criminal Intent	Frances Goren	3 episodes	
2007	George Lopez	Luisa Diaz	Episode: "George Testi-Lies for Benny"	
2007	Ugly Betty	Aunt Mirta	Episode: "A Tree Grows in Guadalajara"	
2007	Cane	Amalia Duque	Main role	
2010	In Plain Sight	Rita Ramirez	Episode: "Coma Chameleon"	
2011	Special Agent Oso	Abuela	Voice, episode: "For Tamales with Love/Pinata Royale"	
2011–13	Happily Divorced	Dori Newman	34 episodes	
2013	Welcome to the Family	Lita	2 episodes	
2013	Nicky Deuce	Tutti	Television film	
2014	Old Soul	Rita	Television film	
2015	Getting On	Sister Lily Claire	Episode: "Reduced to Eating Boiled Magazines and Book Paste"	
2015	A Gift of Miracles	Beverly	Television film	
2015–19	Jane the Virgin	Liliana De La Vega	5 episodes	
2015–18	Nina's World	Abuelita	Voice, main role	
2016	Grey's Anatomy	Gayle McColl	Episode: "Odd Man Out"	
2016	Grace and Frankie	Lucy	Episode: "The Vitamix"	
2017–20	One Day at a Time	Lydia Riera	Main role	
2018	Elena of Avalor	Queen Camila	Voice, 2 episodes	
2019	Carmen Sandiego	Cookie Booker	Voice, 3 episodes	
2019–20	Bless This Mess	Theresa	Recurring role, 3 episodes	
2021	Maya and the Three	Ah Puch	Voice, 5 episodes	
2022	Green Eggs and Ham	Dookess	Voice, 7 episodes	
2022	Norman Lear: 100 Years of Music & Laughter	Herself	TV special	
2022	Santa Bootcamp	Belle	Lifetime Film	
2022	Beauty and the Beast: A 30th Celebration	Narrator	TV special	
2023	Lopez vs Lopez	Dolores	Recurring	
2023–24	Princess Power	Great Aunt Bussyboots	Recurring	

Source: Internet Movie Database & Turner Classic Movies

== Theatre ==
Year	Title	Role	Notes
1945	Skydrift	Angelina	
1958	A View from the Bridge		
1964	She Loves Me	Ilona Ritter	NYC Concert
1964–65	The Sign in Sidney Brustein's Window	Iris Parodus Brustein	
1970	Gantry	Sharon Falconer	Broadway
1970–71	Last of the Red Hot Lovers	Elaine Nazio	Broadway Replacement
1974	Guys and Dolls	Miss Adelaide	
1974	The National Health	Staff Nurse Norton	Broadway
1975–76	The Ritz	Googie Gomez	Broadway
1976	Bells Are Ringing	Ella	
1981	Wally's Cafe	Louise	Broadway
1984–86	The Odd Couple	Olive Madison	Broadway & US Tour
1991	The Glass Menagerie	Amanda Wingfield	
1992	Gypsy	Rose Hovick	
1996	Sunset Boulevard	Norma Desmond	West End replacement
2006	The Glass Menagerie	Amanda Wingfield	
2011	Rita Moreno: Life Without Makeup	Self	

Source: Internet Broadway Database
