= List of awards and nominations received by Rita Moreno =

Rita Moreno awards and nominations
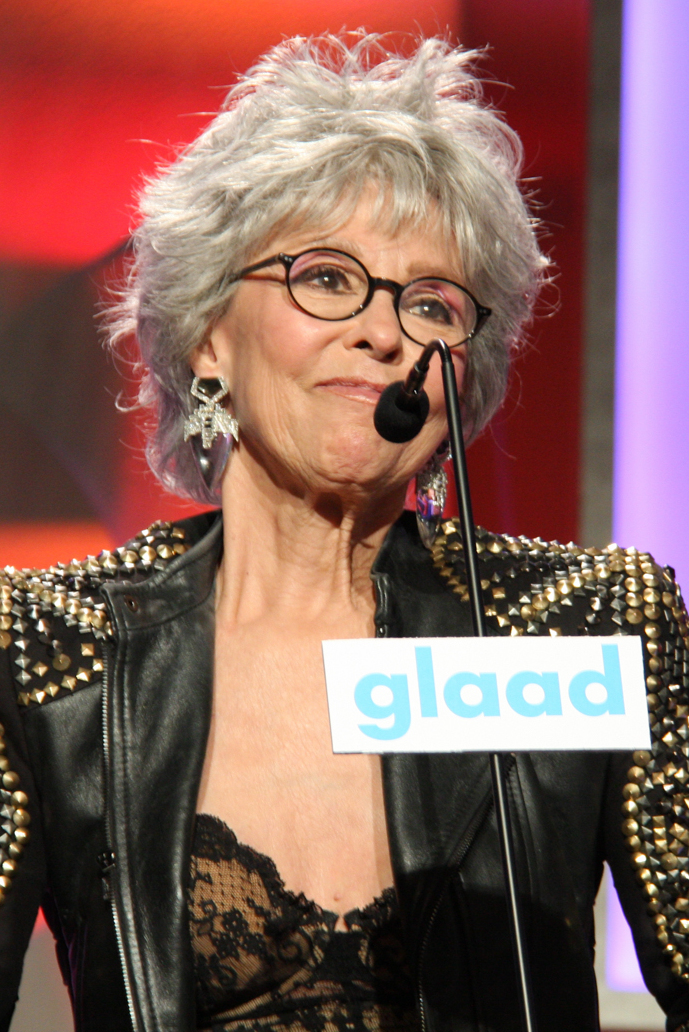
- Moreno at the GLAAD Awards in 2014
Awards and nominations
Award	Wins	Nominations
Academy Awards	1	1
BAFTA Awards	0	1
Emmy Awards	2	10
Golden Globe Awards	1	3
Grammy Awards	1	2
Tony Awards	1	1

Totals (Note: Certain award groups do not simply award one winner. They acknowledge several different recipients, have runners-up, and have third place. Since this is a specific recognition and is different from losing an award, runner-up mentions are considered wins in this award tally. For simplification and to avoid errors, each award in this list has been presumed to have had a prior nomination.)
- Wins: 34
- Nominations: 21

This article is a List of awards and nominations received by Rita Moreno.

Rita Moreno is a Puerto Rican actress, singer, and dancer. With a career spanning nearly 80 years in the entertainment industry, Moreno is one of a few individuals to have won the four major annual American entertainment awards: an EGOT (an Emmy, a Grammy, an Oscar, and a Tony). She also received a Golden Globe Award, and Peabody Award as well as nominations for a British Academy Film Award.

Moreno won the Academy Award for Best Supporting Actress for her iconic performance as Anita in the musical film West Side Story (1961). She also won the Golden Globe Award for Best Supporting Actress – Motion Picture. For work on television, she won two Primetime Emmy Awards for her guest roles on The Muppet Show (1977), and The Rockford Files (1978). For playing Googie Gomez in the Broadway play The Ritz she won the Tony Award for Best Featured Actress in a Play. She reprised the role in the 1976 film adaptation for which she was nominated for the BAFTA Award for Best Actress in a Leading Role. She won the Grammy Award for Best Children's Music Album for The Electric Company (1973).

She is also one of the few performers who have achieved the "Triple Crown of Acting", with individual competitive Academy, Emmy, and Tony awards for acting; she, Helen Hayes, and Viola Davis are the only three who have achieved both distinctions in their lifetimes. She has won numerous honors including a star on the Hollywood Walk of Fame in 1995, the Presidential Medal of Freedom in 2004, the National Medal of Arts in 2009, the Screen Actors Guild Life Achievement Award in 2013, the Kennedy Center Honors in 2015, and the Ellis Island Medal of Honor in 2018.

== Major associations ==
=== Academy Awards ===
Year	Category	Nominated work	Result	Ref.
1961	Best Supporting Actress	West Side Story	Won	

=== BAFTA Awards ===
Year	Category	Nominated work	Result	Ref.
British Academy Film Award
1976	Best Actress in a Leading Role	The Ritz	Nominated	

=== Emmy Awards ===
Year	Category	Nominated work	Result	Ref.
Primetime Emmy Award
1975	Outstanding Continuing or Single Performance by a Supporting Actress in Variety or Music	Out to Lunch	Nominated	
1977	Outstanding Continuing or Single Performance by a Supporting Actress in Variety or Music	The Muppet Show	Won	
1978	Outstanding Single Appearance in a Series	The Rockford Files	Won	
1979	Outstanding Lead Actress in a Drama Series	The Rockford Files	Nominated	
1982	Outstanding Supporting Actress in a Limited Series or Movie	Portrait of a Showgirl	Nominated	
1983	Outstanding Lead Actress in a Comedy Series	9 to 5	Nominated	
Daytime Emmy Awards
1982	Outstanding Performer in Children's Programming	CBS Library	Nominated	
1995	Outstanding Performer in an Animated Program	Where on Earth Is Carmen Sandiego?	Nominated	
1996	Outstanding Performer in an Animated Program	Where on Earth Is Carmen Sandiego?	Nominated	
1997	Outstanding Performer in an Animated Program	Where on Earth Is Carmen Sandiego?	Nominated	

=== Golden Globe Awards ===
Year	Category	Nominated work	Result	Ref.
1961	Best Supporting Actress – Motion Picture	West Side Story	Won	
1976	Best Actress in a Motion Picture – Musical or Comedy	The Ritz	Nominated	
1982	Best Actress in a Television Series – Musical or Comedy	9 to 5	Nominated	

=== Grammy Awards ===
Year	Category	Nominated work	Result	Ref.
Grammy Awards
1962	Album of the Year	West Side Story	Nominated	
1973	Best Album for Children	The Electric Company	Won	
Latin Grammy Award
2012	Lifetime Achievement Award		Won	

=== Screen Actors Guild Awards ===
Year	Category	Nominated work	Result	Ref.
2013	Life Achievement Award		Won	

=== Tony Awards ===
Year	Category	Nominated work	Result	Ref.
1975	Best Supporting or Featured Actress in a Play	The Ritz	Won	

== Miscellaneous awards ==
Organizations	Year	Category	Work	Result	Ref.
ALMA Awards	1998	Best Actress in a Drama Series	Oz	Won	
ALMA Awards	1998	Lifetime Achievement Award		Won	
ALMA Awards	1999	Best Actress	Slums of Beverly Hills	Nominated	
ALMA Awards	1999	Best Actress in a Drama Series	Oz	Won	
ALMA Awards	2000	Best Actress in a Drama Series	Oz	Nominated	
ALMA Awards	2001	Best Actress in a Television Series	Oz	Nominated	
ALMA Awards	2002	Best Actress in a Television Series	Oz	Won	
CableACE Awards	1997	Best Actress in a Dramatic Series	Oz	Won	
Critics' Choice Movie Awards	2022	Best Supporting Actress	West Side Story	Nominated	
Critics' Choice Television Awards	2017	Best Supporting Actress in a Comedy Series	One Day at a Time	Nominated	
Critics' Choice Television Awards	2018	Best Supporting Actress in a Comedy Series	One Day at a Time	Nominated	
Critics' Choice Television Awards	2021	Best Supporting Actress in a Comedy Series	One Day at a Time	Nominated	
Drama Desk Awards	1975	Outstanding Actress in a Play	The Ritz	Nominated	
Drama Desk Awards	1977	Outstanding Featured Actress in a Musical	She Loves Me	Nominated	
Imagen Foundation Awards	2012	Happily Divorced	Best Actress on Television	Nominated	
Imagen Foundation Awards	2017	Best Supporting Actress on Television	One Day at a Time	Nominated	
Imagen Foundation Awards	2018	Best Supporting Actress on Television	One Day at a Time	Nominated	
Imagen Foundation Awards	2019	Best Supporting Actress on Television	One Day at a Time	Won	
Laurel Awards	1962	Top Female Supporting Performance	West Side Story	Won	
London Film Critics' Circle	2021	Best Supporting Actress	West Side Story (2021)	Nominated	
NAACP Image Awards	1999	Outstanding Actress in a Drama Series	Oz	Nominated	
NAACP Image Awards	2000	Outstanding Actress in a Drama Series	Oz	Nominated	
NAACP Image Awards	2003	Outstanding Supporting Actress in a Drama Series	Oz	Nominated	
Online Film & TV Awards	1998	Best Actress in a Cable Series	Oz	Nominated	
Online Film & TV Awards	1998	Best Ensemble in a Cable Series	Oz	Nominated	
Online Film & TV Awards	1999	Best Actress in a Cable Series	Oz	Nominated	
Online Film & TV Awards	1999	Best Ensemble in a Cable Series	Oz	Nominated	
Online Film & TV Awards	2015	Best Guest Actress in a Comedy Series	Jane the Virgin	Won	
Online Film & TV Awards	2017	Best Supporting Actress in a Comedy Series	One Day at a Time	Nominated	
Online Film & TV Awards	2017	Best Ensemble in a Comedy Series	One Day at a Time	Nominated	
Online Film & TV Awards	2017	Television Hall of Fame: Actors		Won	
Sarah Siddons Award	1985	Distinguished Performance	The Odd Couple	Won	
Satellite Awards	1998	Best Actress – Television Series Drama	Oz	Nominated	
Time	2019	Woman of the Year (1961)		Won	In 2019, Time created 89 new covers to celebrate women of the year starting from 1920; it chose Moreno for 1961.

== Honorary awards and citations ==
Organizations	Year	Notes	Result	Ref.
Joseph Jefferson Award	1968	Best Chicago Theatre Actress	Honored	
Hollywood Walk of Fame	1995	Motion Picture Star	Honored	
Library of Congress	2000	Living Legends Award	Honored	
International Latin Music Hall of Fame	2001	Special Recognition Award	Honored	
Presidential Medal of Freedom	2004	Medal	Honored	
National Medal of Arts	2009	Medal	Honored	
Hispanic Organization of Latin Actors	2010	Lifetime Achievement Award	Honored	
Latin Grammy Awards	2012	Lifetime Achievement Award	Honored	
Screen Actors Guild Awards	2013	Life Achievement Award	Honored	
Kennedy Center Honors	2015	Medal	Honored	
Berklee College of Music	2016	Honorary doctorate of music	Honored	
Ellis Island Medal of Honor	2018	Medal	Honored	
Peabody Awards	2019	Career Achievement Award	Honored	
Rose Parade	2020	Grand marshal	Honored	
BBC News	2022	BBC 100 Women	Honored	
Dorian Awards	2022	Timeless Star	Honored	
