= Black Spark =

Black Spark may refer to:

- Black Spark (director), American independent film director and photographer
- Black Spark (Russia), Russian anti-Putin resistance movement
