= Casey Donovan (actor) =

American pornographic actor (1943–1987)

- Born: John Calvin Culver; November 2, 1943; East Bloomfield, New York, U.S.
- Died: August 10, 1987 (aged 43); Inverness, Florida, U.S.
- Other names: Ken Donovan; Calvin Culver
- Education: Canandaigua Academy; State University of New York at Geneseo
- Occupations: Actor; model; producer; writer
- Years active: 1969–1987
- Height: 5 ft 9 in (1.75 m)
- Partner: Tom Tryon (1973–1977)

John Calvin Culver (November 2, 1943 – August 10, 1987), better known under his stage name Casey Donovan, was an American male pornographic film actor from the late 1960s until the mid-1980s, appearing primarily in adult films and videos catering to gay male audiences, during the Golden Age of Porn. Following a brief career as a Latin teacher and a stint as a highly-paid male model, Donovan appeared in Boys in the Sand (1971), the film that would cement his status as a gay icon. Attempts to build on his notoriety to achieve mainstream crossover success failed, but Donovan continued to be a bankable star in the adult industry for the next 15 years. He was briefly a mainstream actor, who appeared on stage, as well as a theatre producer and manager, and appeared as himself in TV series The Emerald City.

== Early life ==
Culver was born in East Bloomfield, New York, growing up there with his parents and older brother Duane.

Culver attended the State University of New York at Geneseo (SUNY), where he was a member of Phi Sigma Epsilon fraternity and the drama club. After graduation in 1965 he accepted a teaching position in Peekskill, New York. He later took a job at the private Ethical Culture Fieldston School on New York City's Central Park West but was fired during his second year following an altercation in which he physically disciplined a female student (reportedly the daughter of actor Eli Wallach).

Following his dismissal, Culver drifted into prostitution. He also began pursuing an acting career, appearing in summer stock theatre with the Peterborough Players.

== Modeling career ==
Through one of his escorting clients, Culver landed a spot with the Wilhelmina Models modeling agency, commanding an hourly rate of US$60 (equivalent to $400 in 2020).

He continued to pursue stage work, landing an understudy job in 1969 in the Off-Broadway gay-themed play And Puppy Dog Tails, making his Broadway debut in 1970 in the Native American-themed production Brave and a co-starring role in the off-Broadway play Circle in the Water (also in 1970).

== Adult film career ==
In 1971, Culver played a supporting role in a low-budget sexploitation thriller film called Ginger. While the film was a commercial and critical failure, Variety noted his performance positively, saying "Only Calvin Culver ... shows any indication of better things to come." This in turn led to an offer to appear in Casey, a gay pornographic film in which Culver played the title role, a gay man who is visited by his fairy godmother Wanda (Culver playing a dual role in drag), and is granted a series of wishes which make him sexually irresistible to other men. Culver later took the title character's name, Casey, and that of the popular Scottish singer-songwriter Donovan to create the pseudonym under which he would appear in all his other erotic roles.

Culver was first credited under the "Casey Donovan" name in Boys in the Sand (1971), directed by Wakefield Poole. The film was an instant success and is considered a classic of male erotic cinema. With the success and celebrity he garnered from the film, Donovan believed that he would be able to cross over into mainstream film. While there were meetings with directors like John Schlesinger and Raymond St. Jacques and talk of casting him in mainstream projects including adaptations of novels by Mary Renault and Patricia Nell Warren, the only film opportunities open to him were as the star of more erotic films. These included the bisexual porn film Score, The Back Row with George Payne, L. A. Tool & Die with Bob Blount and Richard Locke, The Other Side of Aspen with Al Parker, Steve Turk and Dick Fisk, Boys in the Sand II and Inevitable Love, with Jon King and Jamie Wingo.

Shortly before his death he starred, appearing heavily intoxicated, in the fisting movie Fucked Up, for Christopher Rage. He also appeared in a number of heterosexual porn films, most notably The Opening of Misty Beethoven where he had a scene with Constance Money, in which he plays a gay male art dealer who is seduced by a woman.

== Mainstream acting career ==
Outside his adult film career, Donovan continued to pursue stage work. In 1972, he was cast in a short-lived Broadway revival of Captain Brassbound's Conversion. Star Ingrid Bergman described him as "having the same kind and as much charisma as Robert Redford." He then landed a small role in the 1973 Lincoln Center production of The Merchant of Venice, which was praised as having "vivid appeal." In 1974, Donovan starred as Brian, a gay bathhouse attendant, in the play Tubstrip, written and directed by Jerry Douglas, which had successful runs in Los Angeles and San Francisco before moving to Broadway. While the play was critically deemed entertaining enough to its target gay audience (having earned, in the words of one critic, a "nationwide gay housekeeping seal of approval") Donovan himself was judged as simply "no better nor worse [an] actor than most of the others [in the cast]." In 1983, he turned his hand to producing, with an unsuccessful Broadway revival of Terrence McNally's play The Ritz in which he also appeared.

Donovan's iconic status allowed him to build a lucrative career as a high-priced prostitute, though it would cost him his legitimate modeling career as more and more clients made the connection between model Culver and porn star Donovan. He wrote an advice column, "Ask Casey," for the gay-oriented Stallion magazine beginning in 1982.

== Personal life ==
In 1973, Donovan met actor-turned-writer Tom Tryon, and the two entered into a long-term relationship the following year. Tryon was deeply closeted and grew increasingly disturbed by Donovan's notoriety. Their relationship ended in 1977.

In 1978, Donovan purchased a house in Key West, Florida, to run as a bed and breakfast dubbed "Casa Donovan." He struggled to keep it and the business eventually failed. More successful was his time as a celebrity tour guide, conducting all-gay trips in partnership with an outfit called Star Tours to Italy, China, Peru and other destinations.

== Later years and death ==
By 1985, Donovan's health had begun to deteriorate after he had contracted HIV. Although he had counseled his fans through his "Ask Casey" column as early as 1982 to take steps to avoid contracting HIV by reducing their number of sexual partners and urging his fans to be tested for HIV once the test was developed, Donovan did not heed his own advice. He made little or no effort to change his own behavior despite knowing that contracting HIV was then considered terminal, with virtually no treatment options.

On August 10, 1987, Donovan died of an HIV/AIDS-related pulmonary infection in Inverness, Florida, aged 43.

== Filmography ==
=== Television ===
Year	Title	Role	Notes
1977	The Emerald City	Calvin Culver	Episode 1

=== Film ===
Year	Title	Role	Notes
1970	Eleana	Calvin	Debut
1971	Ginger	Rodney	Credited as Calvin Culver
1971	Some of My Best Friends Are...	Lanny	
1971	Casey	Casey / Wanda	Credited as Ken Donovan
1971	Boys in the Sand	Casey	
1972	Pornography in New York	Gay Adult film actor	
1973	The Back Row	Casey	
1973	Fun and Games	Bob Cartright	Credited as Calvin Culver
1973	Dragula	Dragula's Son #1	
1973	Erotikus: A History of the Gay Movie	Casey Donovan	
1973	Score	Eddie	Credited as Calvin Culver
1974	Moving!	Casey	
1976	The Opening of Misty Beethoven	Jacque Beudant	Art Dealer
1978	The Other Side of Aspen	Casey Donovan	
1979	Gal Young Un	Jeb Lantry	Credited as Calvin Culver
1979	L.A. Tool & Die	Fred	
1981	World of Henry Paris	Blonde	
1981	Superstars	Casey Donovan	
1981	Always Ready	John Sharp	
1982	Sleaze	Casey	
1982	Heatstroke	Marty King	
1984	Split Image	Casey Donovan	
1984	Non-Stop	Calvin	
1984	Boys in the Sand II	Casey	
1985	Chance of a Lifetime	Casey	
1985	Inevitable Love	Fake Vice Cop	
1986	Swallow It	Calvin	
1986	Fucked Up	Casey	
1987	Men & Films	Casey Donovan	
1987	Sex Toilets	Calvin	
1988	Early House	Casey	Posthumous release
1990	Remembering	Casey Donovan	Posthumous release
2007	Falcon Studios 35th Anniversary Limited Edition	Casey Donovan	Posthumous release
2008	Wrangler: Anatomy of an Icon	Casey Donovan	Posthumous release
2013	I'm a Porn Star	Adult film actor	Posthumous release
2015	Seed Money: The Chuck Holmes Story	Blonde	Posthumous release
2019	Ask Any Buddy	Casey Donovan	Posthumous release
2020	Goodbye Seventies	Casey Donovan	Posthumous release
2021	Falcon Icons: The 1970s	Casey Donoban	Posthumous release
2024	Love a Man with Feet	Casey Donovan	Posthumous release

== Stage ==
=== Theatre ===
Year	Title	Role(s)	Venue(s)	Notes
1969	And Puppy Dog Tails	Understudy	Cherry Lane Theatre	Off-Broadway debut
1970	Circle in the Water	Co-star	Garrick Theatre	Off-Broadway
1970	Brave	Ensemble	Morosco Theatre	Broadway debut
1972	Captain Brassbound's Conversion	American Armed Guard	Ethel Barrymore Theatre	Broadway; starred Ingrid Bergman
1973	The Merchant of Venice	Leonardo	Vivian Beaumont Theater	Broadway; Lincoln Center Repertory
1974	Tubstrip	Brian	Mayfair Theatre	Broadway and National Tour
1983	The Ritz	Michael Brick	Albery Theatre	Broadway revival; also co-producer
1984	Pins and Needles	Performer	Off-Broadway	Revival of the 1937 musical

== See also ==
- LGBT culture in New York City
- List of LGBT people from New York City
- List of male performers in gay porn films
- List of pornographic movie studios
