= Rita Moreno =

Puerto Rican actress, singer, and dancer (born 1931)

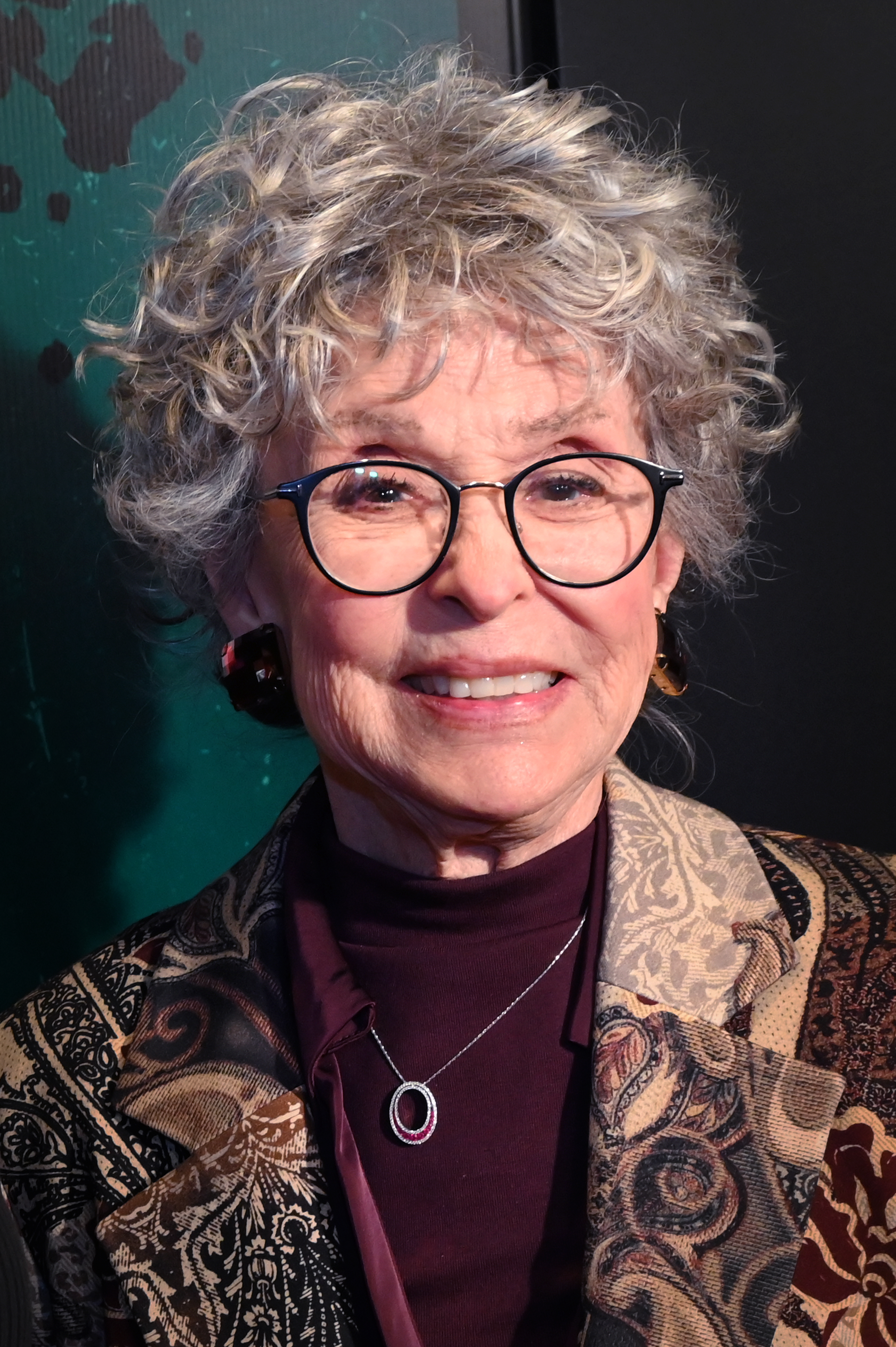
- Moreno in 2025
- Born: Rosa Dolores Alverío Marcano; December 11, 1931 (age 94); Humacao, Puerto Rico
- Occupations: Actress; singer; dancer
- Years active: 1943–present
- Works: Full list
- Spouse: Leonard Gordon (m. 1965; died 2010)
- Children: 1
- Awards: Full list

Rita Moreno (born Rosa Dolores Alverío Marcano; December 11, 1931) is a Puerto Rican actress, dancer, and singer. With a career spanning eight decades, she is known for her roles on stage and screen, and is one of the last remaining stars from the Golden Age of Hollywood. Among her numerous accolades, she is one of the few actors to have been awarded an Emmy, a Grammy, an Oscar, and a Tony (EGOT) and the Triple Crown of Acting. (Note: with individual competitive Academy, Emmy, and Tony awards) She has been honored with a Presidential Medal of Freedom in 2004, the National Medal of Arts in 2009, the Screen Actors Guild Life Achievement Award in 2013, the Kennedy Center Honor in 2015, and a Peabody Award in 2019.

Moreno's early work included supporting roles in the classic musical films Singin' in the Rain (1952) and The King and I (1956), before her breakout role as Anita in West Side Story (1961), which earned her the Academy Award for Best Supporting Actress, making her the first Hispanic woman to win an Academy Award. Moreno returned in the supporting role of Valentina in the 2021 Spielberg-directed remake of the same name. Her other films include Popi (1969), Carnal Knowledge (1971), The Four Seasons (1981), I Like It Like That (1994), Slums of Beverly Hills (1998), and Fast X (2023).

In theater, she starred as Googie Gomez in the 1975 Terrence McNally musical The Ritz earning her the Tony Award for Best Featured Actress in a Play. She reprised her role in the 1976 film directed by Richard Lester which earned her a BAFTA Award for Best Actress nomination. She also acted in Lorraine Hansberry's The Sign in Sidney Brustein's Window in 1964 and in Neil Simon's The Odd Couple in 1985.

Moreno was a cast member in The Electric Company (1971–1977), for which she earned an Grammy for Best Album for Children in 1972, and played Sister Peter Marie Reimondo on the HBO series Oz (1997–2003). She received two consecutive Primetime Emmy Awards for her roles on The Muppet Show in 1977 and The Rockford Files in 1978. She acted in Where on Earth Is Carmen Sandiego? (1994–1999), The CW series Jane the Virgin (2015–2019), and the Netflix revival of One Day at a Time (2017–2020). Her life was profiled in Rita Moreno: Just a Girl Who Decided to Go for It (2021).

== Early years ==
Rita Moreno was born Rosa Dolores Alverío Marcano, on December 11, 1931, in a Humacao, Puerto Rico, hospital to Rosa María (née Marcano) (1912–1999), a seamstress, and Francisco José "Paco" Alverío, a farmer who was born in 1908. Her parents divorced the following year. She was nicknamed "Rosita" and raised in nearby Juncos. Her maternal grandparents were Justino Marcano (b. Puerto Rico) and Trinidad from Spain.

Moreno's mother moved to New York City in 1936, taking her daughter, but not her son, Moreno's younger brother, Francisco, whom Moreno would not see again until 2021. Moreno adopted the surname of her first stepfather, Edward Moreno, Rosa Maria's second husband. She spent her teenage years living in the NYC suburb of Valley Stream on Long Island.

== Career ==
=== 1945–1959: Theater debut and early films ===
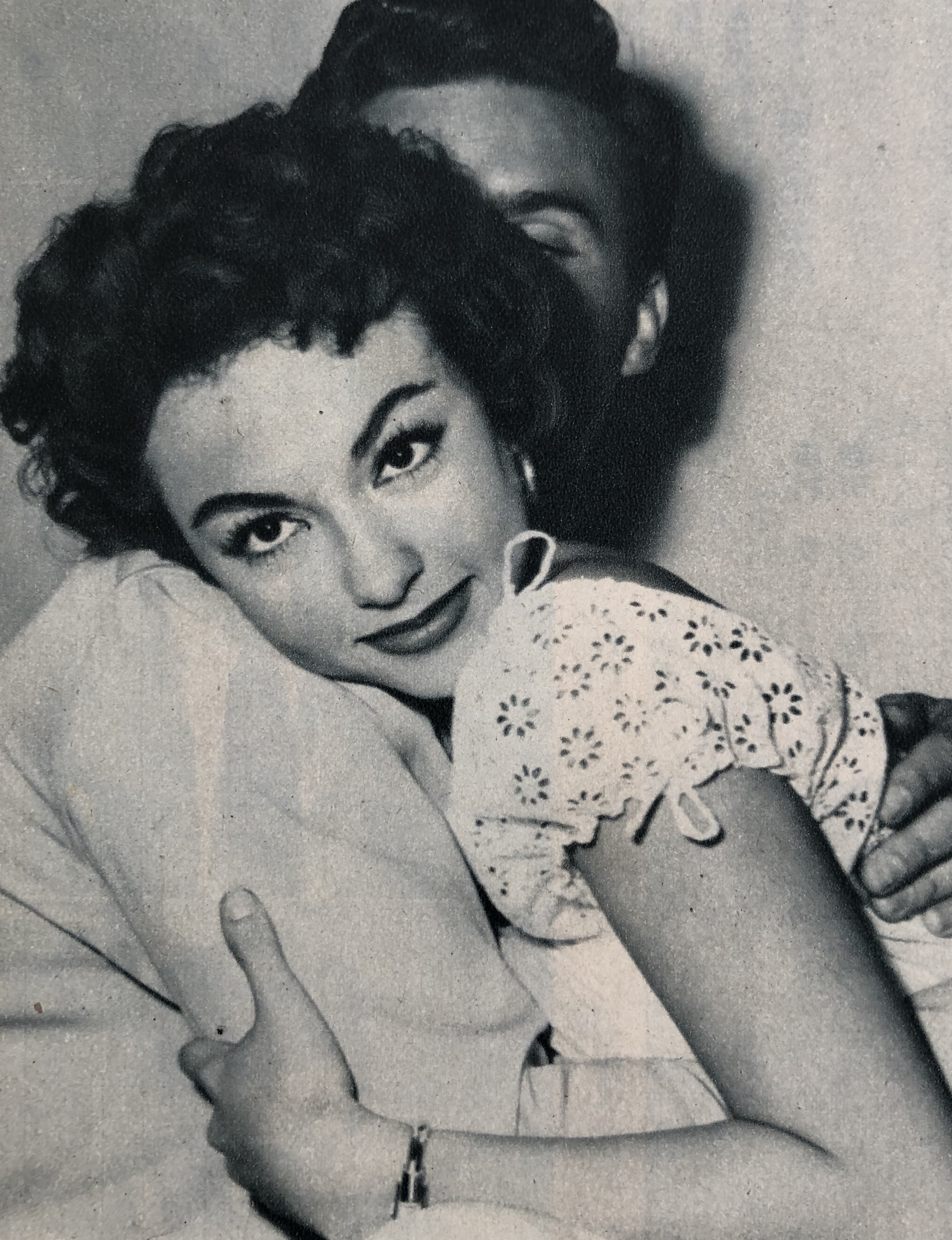
Rita Moreno in 1954

Moreno began her first dancing lessons soon after arriving in New York with a Spanish dancer known as "Paco Cansino", who was a paternal uncle of film star Rita Hayworth. When she was 11 years old, she lent her voice to Spanish-language versions of American films. She had her first Broadway role, as "Angelina" in the 1945 production of Skydrift, by the age of 13, which caught the attention of Hollywood talent scouts. Moreno said she was raped by her agent while she was a teen actor.

Moreno's film career began in the later years of the Golden Age of Hollywood. Moreno and her mother moved to a Culver City "cottage" within walking distance of MGM. After signing a contract, Moreno began her cinema career, performing under the name of "Rosita Moreno". MGM had her first name abbreviated to Rita. Her first film was So Young, So Bad (1950). Moreno's contract with MGM was cut short, after which she found work in films independently. She acted steadily in films throughout the 1950s, usually in small roles, including in The Toast of New Orleans (1950). In 1952, she appeared in Stanley Donen's musical comedy film Singin' in the Rain alongside Gene Kelly, Debbie Reynolds and Donald O'Connor. In the film she played silent film star Zelda Zanders. She described having gotten the role by Gene Kelly "wanting her in the movie" and that she "seemed to fit the role for him". Moreno praised Kelly for casting her in a non-stereotypical Hispanic role playing Zelda saying, "he never said 'Oh she's too Latina', he just thought I'd be fine for it". She called the experience working in the film as an "amazing experience" and a "privilege".

In March 1954, Moreno was featured on the cover of Life magazine with the caption "Rita Moreno: An Actress's Catalog of Sex and Innocence". She was the first Puerto Rican featured in this publication. Moreno disliked most of her film work during this period, as she felt the roles she was given were very stereotypical. One exception was her supporting role in the film version of Rodgers and Hammerstein's The King and I directed by Walter Lang. In the film she played Tuptim, a slave brought from Burma to be one of the King's junior wives. She starred alongside Yul Brynner and Deborah Kerr. The film was a critical and financial success. It received nine Academy Award nominations including five wins including Best Actor, Best Art Direction – Color, Best Costume Design – Color, Best Original Score, and Best Sound Recording. In 1959, Moreno appeared as Lola Montez in Season 3, Episode 23, of the TV western Tales of Wells Fargo, episode title "Lola Montez".

=== 1960–1969: Breakout with West Side Story ===
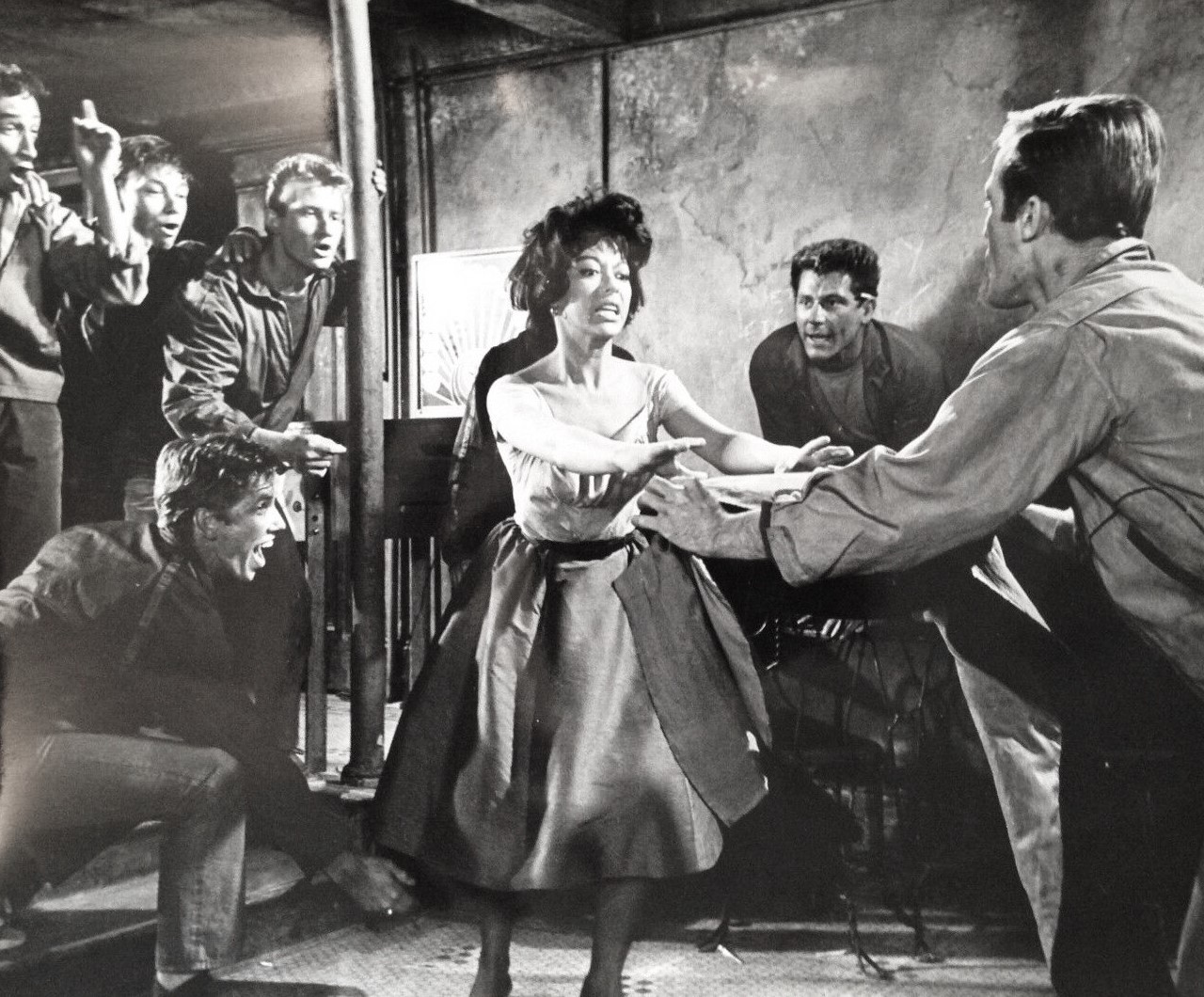
Moreno as Anita in West Side Story

In 1961, Moreno landed the role of Anita in Robert Wise and Jerome Robbins' film adaptation of Leonard Bernstein's and Stephen Sondheim's groundbreaking Broadway musical West Side Story, which had been played by Chita Rivera on Broadway. Moreno earned acclaim for her performance. Bosley Crowther of The New York Times described Moreno's performance full of "spitfire". Variety wrote, "Moreno...presents a fiery characterization and also scores hugely". The film went on to win ten Academy Awards including for Best Picture. Moreno won the Academy Award for Best Supporting Actress for that role.

After winning the Oscar, Moreno thought she would be able to continue to perform less stereotypical film roles, but was disappointed:

Ha, ha. I showed them. I didn't make another movie for seven years after winning the Oscar.... Before West Side Story, I was always offered the stereotypical Latina roles. The Conchitas and Lolitas in westerns. I was always barefoot. It was humiliating, embarrassing stuff. But I did it because there was nothing else. After West Side Story, it was pretty much the same thing. A lot of gang stories.

Moreno became frustrated with the situation and left to London, where she joined the cast of She Loves Me. Due to work limitations for foreigners in the United Kingdom, she returned to Broadway in The Sign in Sidney Brustein's Window.

Moreno had a major role in Summer and Smoke (1961), released soon after West Side Story. She did appear in one film during her self-imposed exile from Hollywood – Cry of Battle (1963) – although it had been filmed directly before and after she won the Academy Award. She made her return to film in The Night of the Following Day (1968) with Marlon Brando, and followed that with Popi (1969), and Marlowe (1969) with James Garner. Moreno's Broadway credits include Last of the Red Hot Lovers (1969), the musical Gantry (1970), and The Ritz, for which she won the 1975 Tony Award for Best Featured Actress in a Play. She appeared in the female version of The Odd Couple that ran in Chicago, for which she won the Sarah Siddons Award in 1985. Her costar Sally Struthers later stated in an interview on Gilbert Gottfried's Amazing Colossal Podcast that it was an unpleasant experience until Rita Moreno, who Struthers alleges was mean-spirited towards her, left the play and was replaced by Brenda Vaccaro.

=== 1970–1999: Established actress ===
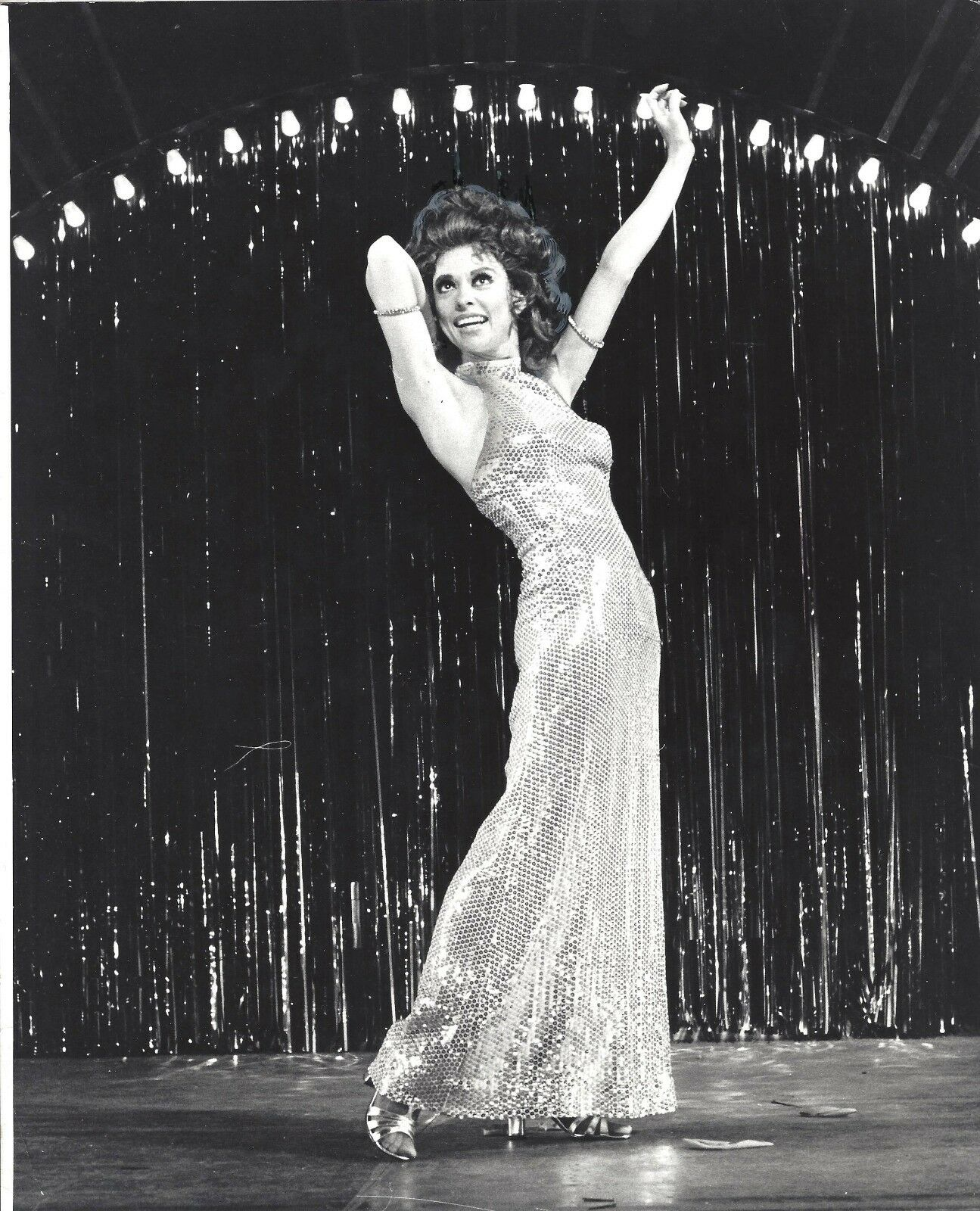
Moreno in The Ritz in 1975

From 1971 to 1977, Moreno was a main cast member on the PBS children's series The Electric Company. She screamed the show's opening line, "Hey, you guys!" Her roles on the show included Millie the Helper, the naughty little girl Pandora, and Otto, a very short-tempered director. Moreno also starred in Mike Nichols' Carnal Knowledge (1971) alongside Jack Nicholson, Candice Bergen, Ann-Margret, and Art Garfunkel. In the film she plays a prostitute named Louise, whom Jack Nicholson plays cards with. The film was a critical success. In 1976 she starred as Googie Gomez in Richard Lester's film adaptation of the comedy farce The Ritz alongside Jack Weston, Jerry Stiller, and F. Murray Abraham. Charles Champlin of the Los Angeles Times wrote that the film made the transition from the stage "surprisingly well, given the odds," with "two of the most flamboyantly entertaining and skillful comedy performances of the year" by Jack Weston and Rita Moreno.

Moreno's appearance on The Muppet Show earned her a Primetime Emmy Award for Outstanding Individual Performance in a Variety or Music Program in 1977. As a result, she became the third person (after Richard Rodgers and Helen Hayes) to have won an Oscar (1962), a Grammy (1972), a Tony (1975), and an Emmy (1977), frequently referred to as an "EGOT". She won another Emmy award the following year, 1978, this time a Primetime Emmy Award for Outstanding Guest Actress in a Drama Series, for her portrayal of former call girl Rita Kapcovic on a three-episode arc on The Rockford Files.

In the 1980s, Moreno starred as Lucille in Richard Benner's comedy-drama film Happy Birthday, Gemini alongside Madeline Kahn. She was in Alan Alda's The Four Seasons (1981) which was a financial and critical hit and starred Alda, Carol Burnett, Len Cariou, Sandy Dennis, and Jack Weston. She was a regular on the three-season network run of 9 to 5, a sitcom based on the film hit, during the early 1980s. Rita Moreno has made numerous guest appearances on television series in the 1980s, including The Love Boat, The Cosby Show, The Golden Girls, and Miami Vice. For her performance in Two Ladies of Broadway (1992), Moreno drew inspiration from the "Spanglish" spoken by her mother, who visited the show in person.

In 1993, Moreno was invited to perform at President Bill Clinton's inauguration and later that month was asked to perform at the White House. During the mid-1990s, Moreno provided the voice of Carmen Sandiego on Fox's animated series Where on Earth Is Carmen Sandiego? In the franchise's 2019 animated series, Moreno voices the character Cookie Booker. In the late 1990s, Moreno played Sister Pete, a nun trained as a psychologist in the popular HBO series Oz, for which she won several ALMA Awards. She made a guest appearance on The Nanny as Coach Stone, Maggie's tyrannical gym teacher, whom Fran Fine also remembered from her school as Ms. Wickavich.

=== 2000s–2010s ===
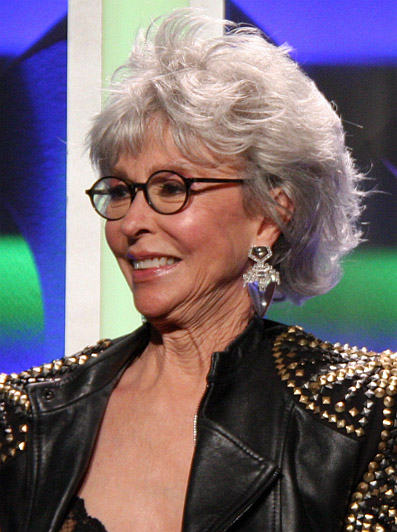
Moreno in 2014

She released an eponymous album of nightclub songs in 2000 on the Varèse Sarabande label, with liner notes by Michael Feinstein. In 2006, she portrayed Amanda Wingfield in Berkeley Repertory Theatre's revival of The Glass Menagerie. She had a recurring role on Law & Order: Criminal Intent as the dying mother of Detective Robert Goren. She played the family matriarch on the 2007 TV series Cane, which starred Jimmy Smits and Hector Elizondo. She played the mother of Fran Drescher's character in the 2011–13 TV sitcom Happily Divorced.

Since then, she has continued to work in film, including a small voice role in the 2014 film Rio 2, perhaps her most commercially successful film. In September 2011, Moreno began performing a solo autobiographical show at the Berkeley Repertory Theatre, Rita Moreno: Life Without Makeup written by the theatre's artistic director Tony Taccone after hours of interviews with Moreno. In 2014, Moreno appeared in the NBC television film Old Soul, alongside Natasha Lyonne, Fred Willard and Ellen Burstyn. The film was intended as a pilot for a television series, but it was not picked up.

Moreno plays the matriarch of a Cuban-American family in the Netflix sitcom One Day at a Time, a remake produced by Norman Lear of Lear's 1975–84 sitcom. The first season premiered in January 2017. Critics overall praised the show, and especially the performances of Moreno and the series' star, Justina Machado. Also that year, Moreno and others contributed to Lin-Manuel Miranda's single "Almost Like Praying" where proceeds from the song went to the Hispanic Federation's UNIDOS Disaster Relief program to benefit those affected by Hurricane Maria that devastated the island of Puerto Rico.

=== 2020s ===
In 2020–21, Moreno starred in and executive-produced the Steven Spielberg–directed adaptation of West Side Story. Moreno plays a newly created character, Valentina; she famously won the Academy Award for Best Supporting Actress for playing Anita in the 1961 original movie. The film was released on December 10, 2021. Justin Chang of NPR wrote, "Sixty years later, Moreno is an executive producer on Spielberg's West Side Story. She also gives a poignant performance in the new role of Valentina, the widow of Doc, the drugstore owner. By her presence, Moreno teaches us how to approach this movie, as both an affectionate tribute and a gentle corrective."

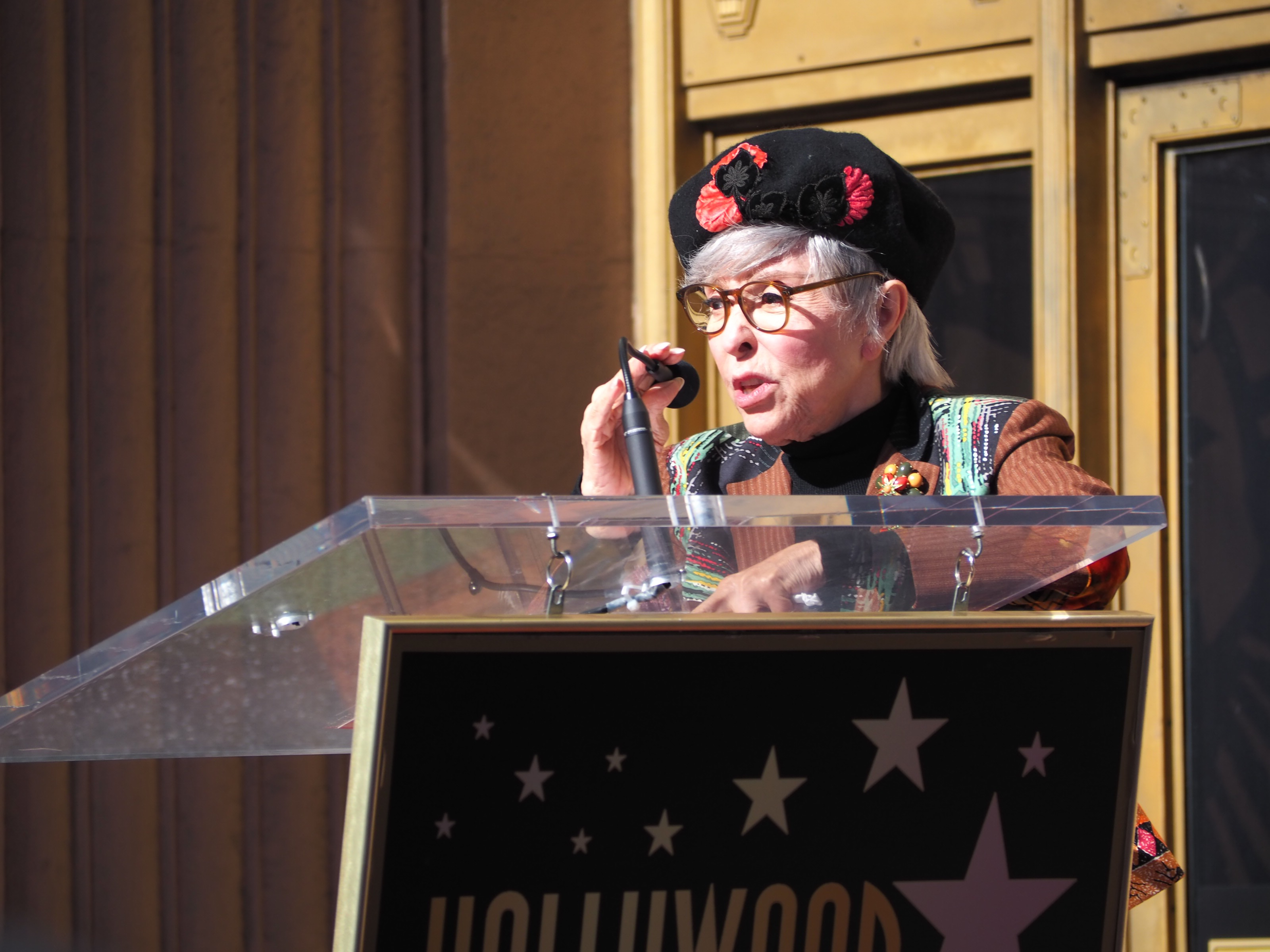
Moreno at the Walk of Fame ceremony in 2022

On August 29, 2021, Moreno took part in the "Wicked in Concert" special on PBS, PBS.org and the PBS Video App, performing "The Wizard and I".

Moreno's life was profiled in the feature documentary entitled Rita Moreno: Just a Girl Who Decided to Go for It which was produced by Lin-Manuel Miranda. The film premiered at the Sundance Film Festival and received positive reviews. The Guardian declared, "Overall, she emerges just as vampish, feisty and fun as you'd expect, and as a gracious giver of speeches at ceremonies where she collects endless lifetime achievement awards".

In 2023, Moreno starred in the sports comedy 80 for Brady about four elderly women who travel to see Tom Brady and the New England Patriots play at the Super Bowl LI. Moreno co-starred alongside Jane Fonda, Lily Tomlin, and Sally Field, and played Abuelita Toretto, the grandmother of Dom (Vin Diesel), Jakob (John Cena), and Mia (Jordana Brewster) in Fast X, the tenth installment of the Fast & Furious franchise. Moreno played Angelica in Family Switch.

== Personal life ==
From 1954 to 1962, Moreno was in an on-and-off relationship with Marlon Brando. She revealed in her memoir that she became pregnant by Brando and he arranged for an abortion. The abortion was botched, she went home and bled as the fetus died inside her and she had to be rushed to the hospital to have it surgically removed. Soon after, Brando fell in love with his co-star on Mutiny on the Bounty Tarita Teriipaia, yet returned to her; Moreno attempted suicide by overdosing on Brando's sleeping pills. After the incident, Brando advised Moreno to go into therapy. They didn't reconnect until 1968 to film The Night of the Following Day. The two were on good terms after that and remained friends until Brando's death. Moreno also acknowledged that she dated Elvis Presley "several times," though she described their romance as brief, claiming that she found Presley to be "sweet, but boring."

In 1965, Moreno married cardiologist and internist Leonard Gordon, who became her manager after he retired from medicine. In 1995, they relocated to Berkeley, California. They remained together until his death in 2010. Moreno and Gordon have one daughter, Fernanda Gordon Fisher, and two grandsons. Moreno said she once considered leaving her husband, but did not want to break up her family.

== Acting credits and accolades ==
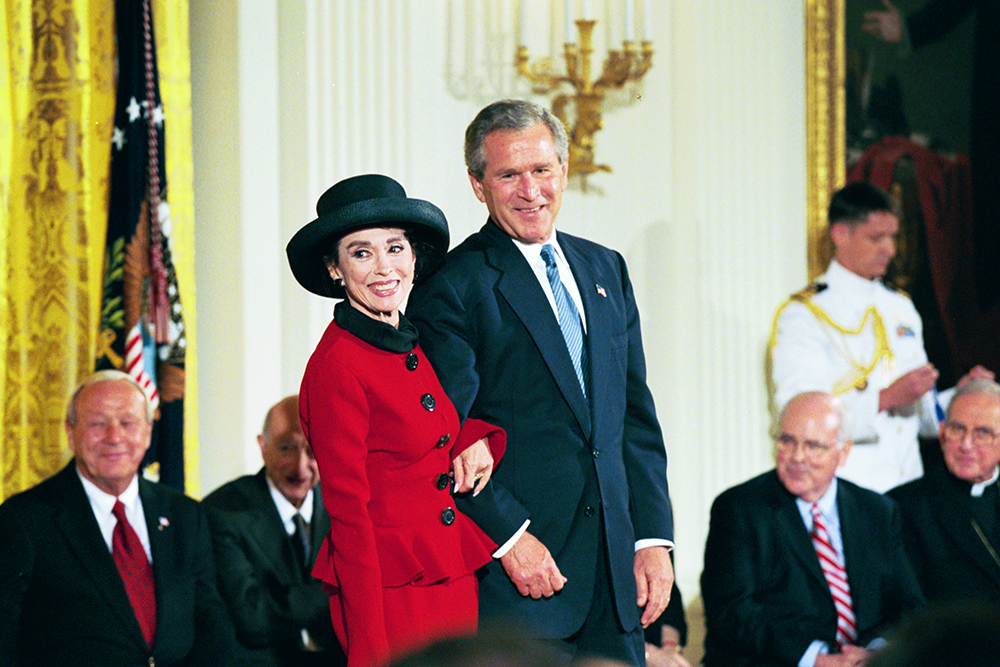
Moreno with President Bush in 2004, prior to receiving the Medal of Freedom

Moreno has achieved what is called the Triple Crown of Acting, with individual competitive Academy, Emmy and Tony awards for acting; as well as the EGOT. In 1962, she won the Oscar for Best Supporting Actress for West Side Story. When Ariana DeBose won Best Supporting Actress for the same role in the 2021 adaptation of the film, Moreno and DeBose became the third pair of actors to win separate acting Oscars for portraying the same character. In 1972, she received a Grammy Award for Best Children's Album for The Electric Company. In 1975, she won the Tony Award for Best Featured Actress in a Play for The Ritz. She won her Primetime Emmy Awards in 1977 and 1978 for her performances in The Muppet Show and The Rockford Files, respectively.

She has also received a Golden Globe Award, a star on the Hollywood Walk of Fame, she was Inducted into the California Hall of Fame, 2007 When her star was unveiled, the celebration of "Rita Moreno Day" was also announced. The piece had been engraved in 1982 but remained in storage for a while. The celebration was in support of the Trust of the Latino Communities. In 2013, she received the Screen Actors Guild Life Achievement Award which was presented to her by Morgan Freeman.

She has won numerous other honors, including various lifetime achievement awards and the Presidential Medal of Freedom, America's highest civilian honor. In 2009, President Barack Obama presented her with the National Medal of Arts. In 2015, she was awarded a Kennedy Center Honors Lifetime Artistic Achievement Award for her contribution to American culture, through performing arts. She was awarded the Peabody Career Achievement Award in 2019. She also received the Screen Actors Guild Life Achievement Award in 2013, and was awarded the Peabody Award in 2019. In October 2025, Moreno was honored with the George Eastman Award.

== See also ==
- List of Puerto Ricans
- List of Puerto Ricans in the Academy Awards
- List of people who have won an Emmy, a Grammy, an Oscar and a Tony Award
- List of Puerto Rican Presidential Medal of Freedom recipients
- History of women in Puerto Rico
