= Manshots =

- Categories: Film review magazine specializing in gay pornography
- Founded: 1988
- Final issue: June–August 2001
- Country: United States
- Language: English

Manshots was an international film review magazine specializing in gay pornography. The magazine included interviews with the directors and actors, original glamour/soft porn photo spreads, video stills, special features on new film reviews, and obituaries. The magazine was printed in the U.S. with (roughly) nine issues per year running from 1988 through to 2001.

The editor of Manshots was Jerry Douglas until March 2001 issue. Then the company of the magazine was sold. The magazine ceased publication with the last issue in June–August 2001—just one issue released after it had been sold.

Archives are held at University of Minnesota.

== See also ==
- List of pornographic magazines
