= The Ritz (play) =

Play by Terrence McNally

Original 1975 Broadway windowcard for the Longacre Theatre.

The Ritz is a comedic farce by Terrence McNally. The 1975 Broadway production starred Rita Moreno, who won a Tony Award for her performance as Googie Gomez. Moreno and the original cast reprised their roles for the 1976 film adaptation directed by Richard Lester.

== Plot ==
The farce is set in a gay bathhouse in Manhattan, where unsuspecting businessman Gaetano Proclo, a heterosexual, has taken refuge from his homicidal brother-in-law Carmine Vespucci, a mobster. Gaetano stumbles across an assortment of oddball characters, including a rabid chubby chaser, go-go boys, a squeaky-voiced detective, and Googie Gomez, a third-rate entertainer with visions of Broadway glory who mistakes him for a famous producer and whom he mistakes for a man in drag. Further complications arise when Gaetano's wife, Vivian, tracks him down and jumps to all the wrong conclusions about his sexual orientation.

== Production history ==
=== Original Broadway production ===
McNally was playwright-in-residence at Yale University, and while there, wrote a play titled The Tubs, which was slang for the "baths". The play was presented at Yale Repertory Theatre in 1974. It was chosen to be produced on Broadway, but the title was changed because a play with a similar title (Tubstrip by Jerry Douglas) was playing in New York City. The Tubs title was also a nod to one of the jokes of the play, "an infatuation for overstuffed men by 'chubby chasers.'"

The Ritz premiered on Broadway at the Longacre Theatre on January 20, 1975, and closed after 398 performances and 10 previews. Directed by Robert Drivas, the cast included Jack Weston (Gaetano), Rita Moreno (Googie), Jerry Stiller (Carmine Vespuci), F. Murray Abraham (Chris), Stephen Collins (Michael Brick), and George Dzundza (Abe).

Moreno won the Tony Award and was nominated for a Drama Desk Award for her performance, and the play received a Drama Desk nomination as Outstanding New American Play.

=== Revivals ===
The first Broadway revival of The Ritz opened in previews in May 1983 at Xenon, formerly Henry Miller's Theatre, but closed after a single regular performance on May 2, 1983, and two weeks of previews. The play was directed by Michael Bavar and featured Taylor Reed as Gaetano, Casey Donovan as Brick, and Holly Woodlawn as Googie Gomez, and Mr. America Tom Terwilliger as one of the bathhouse patrons

A limited-run Broadway revival produced by the Roundabout Theatre Company began previews at Studio 54 on September 15, 2007, officially opening on October 11 and closing on December 9, 2007. Directed by Joe Mantello, the cast included Rosie Perez as Googie Gomez, Kevin Chamberlin as Gaetano Proclo, and Seth Rudetsky and Ryan Idol as bathhouse patrons. The play had been slightly rewritten. Due to AIDS, the baths are presented as an "abstract farce machine" and jokes about sexually transmitted diseases are dropped. The music includes a more current disco-style.

== Critical response ==
Mel Gussow, in his review of the 1983 production for The New York Times, wrote: "Of the three versions of the show I have seen, at the Yale Repertory Theater (under its original title, The Tubs), on Broadway and at Xenon, this is easily the least amusing and the most overbearing...In the current production, the role [Googie] is undertaken by Holly Woodlawn, a transvestite actor of Andy Warhol movie fame. He is not bad, but he is not Googie. "

Ben Brantley reviewed the 2007 production for The New York Times, writing: "This latest revival of 'The Ritz' is cute, cuddly and often oddly inert...Stripped of the amyl-nitrite-scented clouds of novelty that clung to it 32 years ago, the show is exposed as a friendly, conventional sitcom for the stage. And though it features ace performances by Ms. Perez and by Kevin Chamberlin as a visitor from the planet of the heteros, Joe Mantello's direction rarely revs up to the dizzy velocity that farce demands."

Peter Wolfe noted that, with The Ritz, McNally's "command of stagecraft represents the advance he had in mind when he called his mature plays operas in contrast to the aria-like ambience of their predecessors."

== 1976 film version ==
Weston, Moreno, Stiller, and Abraham reprised their stage roles in the 1976 film version directed by Richard Lester. Also in the cast were Kaye Ballard and Treat Williams. The film, Weston, and Moreno received Golden Globe nominations in the comedy category.

== Awards and nominations ==
=== Original Broadway production ===
Year	Award	Category	Nominee	Result
1975	Tony Award	Best Featured Actress in a Play	Rita Moreno	Won
1975	Drama Desk Award	Outstanding Play		Nominated
1975	Drama Desk Award	Outstanding Actress in a Play	Rita Moreno	Won

== See also ==
- Continental Baths
