= Michael Stabile =

American journalist and documentary filmmaker

Michael Stabile III (1974) is an American journalist and documentary filmmaker best known for his work in and about the sex industry. He is the director of Seed Money, a documentary about pioneering gay porn producer Chuck Holmes, of Falcon Studios. Stabile's written work on sex and sexuality has appeared in Playboy, The Daily Beast, BuzzFeed, and New York Times, among others.

Stabile serves at the Director of Public Affairs for the Free Speech Coalition, the national trade organization for the adult industry, and has been featured in the publications includingSan Francisco Chronicle, Washington Post, Los Angeles Times, Rolling Stone and the Huffington Post speaking on issues related to the industry.

Stabile is the owner and founder of Polari Media, a media strategies firm based in Los Angeles.

== Early career ==
Stabile began his career as the editor of San Francisco Metropolitan, and alt-weekly based in the Bay Area. He subsequently wrote or edited for numerous Bay Area publications, including San Francisco Bay Guardian, The Bold Italic and Gay.com.

== Adult career ==
In 2003, he became interested in the intersection of adult content and LGBTQ culture. He took over as editor of Gay Porn Blog and the producer of The Tim and Roma Show, a web-based talk show about the gay adult industry.

In 2004, he and Jack Shamama co-created the gay pornographic soap opera Wet Palms for which they won a GayVN Award for Best Screenplay. He has also written several other GayVN-nominated movies including Spokes III, Cross Country, and Master of the House. Two of the films were included in "Top 10 Gay Porn Movies of the Decade" by Gawker Media's Fleshbot with credit given to the writing team of Stabile and Shamama.

In 2008, Stabile launched gay news site TheSword.com. He was named "an arbiter of taste for gay porn" by the Village Voice.

== Film Work ==
Stabile's documentary short, Smut Capital of America premiered at the 2011 Tribeca Film Festival on April 24, 2011.

In 2015, his documentary Seed Money played over 50 festivals across the world and was acquired for distribution by Breaking Glass Pictures.
