= Steve Taylor (actor, born 1939) =

American actor and producer (1939–1986)

- Born: Richard Cole; November 12, 1939; Dixfield, Oxford County, Maine, U.S.
- Died: September 9, 1986 (aged 46); Los Angeles, California, U.S.
- Other name: Steven Taylor
- Occupations: Actor; photographer; producer; entrepreneur
- Years active: 1977–1986
- Agent(s): Falcon Studios; Surge Studios
- Partner: Al Parker (1973–1986)

Steve Taylor (born Richard Cole; November 12, 1939 – September 9, 1986) was an American adult film actor, producer, photographer, and entrepreneur. He was an influential figure in the gay adult entertainment industry during the late 1970s and early 1980s, primarily known for co-founding Surge Studios with his long-term partner, Al Parker.

== Early life ==
Richard was born on November 12, 1939, in Dixfield, Maine. Taylor survived a severe childhood accident involving household bleach before relocating to Southern California to enter the adult entertainment industry.

== Career ==
=== Acting and modeling ===
Taylor initially worked as a model, recognized for his distinct "bearded bear" physique and natural on-screen dialogue. His prominent film roles included Inches (1979), Wanted (1980), and Flashback (1981).

=== Surge Studios and production ===
In 1980, Taylor and Al Parker co-founded Surge Studios. Taylor managed the business operations and worked as the studio's primary still photographer while frequently remaining uncredited, and he later helped pioneer safer sex practices in the studio's productions.

== Personal life ==
Taylor met Al Parker in 1973 in Hermosa Beach, California, beginning a nearly 14-year partnership.

== Death ==
Taylor died from AIDS complications in Los Angeles on September 9, 1986, and his remains were scattered at sea.

== Filmography ==
=== Film ===
==== Actor ====
Year	Title	Role	Notes
1979	Inches	Lee	Debut
1979	Weekend Lockup	Steve	
1980	Wanted	Rick	
1981	Flashback	Mr. Ross	
1981	Performance	Steve	
1983	Games	Lover	
1983	Dangerous	Steve	
1984	Love a Man with a Beard	Steve	
1985	The Young Stimulators	Bill	
1985	Scared Stiff	Steve	
1985	Therapy	Steve	
1986	Oversize Load	Steve	
1988	Rough Riders: Stroke 11	Steve Taylor	Posthumous release
1990	Love a Man with a Mustache	Steve Taylor	Posthumous release
2010	Superstars Rising	Steve Taylor	Posthumous release
2012	Men in Uniform: Sir, Seed My Ass!	Steve	Posthumous release
2021	Falcon Icons: The 1970s	Steve Taylor	Posthumous release

==== Producer ====
Year	Title	Role	Notes
1982	Turned On	Producer	Surge Studios Films
1983	A Few Good Men...	Executive Producer	Surge Studios
1986	Oversize Load	Producer	Surge Studios
