= Dream Team (1999 film) =

1999 gay pornographic film, written and directed by Jerry Douglas

- One of cover arts of earliest video release
- Directed by: Jerry Douglas
- Written by: Jerry Douglas
- Produced by: Scott Masters
- Starring: Tony Donovan; Kurt Young; Rick Chase
- Production company: Studio 2000
- Release date: 1999 (United States)

Dream Team is a 1999 gay pornographic film, written and directed by Jerry Douglas, starring Tony Donovan, Rick Chase and Kurt Young, and produced by Studio 2000. This movie tells the coming-of-age stories of a group of high school basketball team players who come to terms with their sexualities at a young age in 1957, and later in a 1962 reunion.

== Plot synopsis ==
NOTE: This film has character names. However, names of real-life performers are used in this article.

The story is set in Herbert Hoover High School in Heartland Heights, Iowa. It features seven former high school basketball players, part of the class of 1957, and it then shows their five-year reunion in 1962. The movie switches scenes between high school and the reunion.

In 1962, Rick Chase is now an actor in California. Aaron Lawrence becomes a reverend primarily to repress his homosexuality and his love for Chase. Tony Donovan is unhappily married with a wife and children, and Kurt Young cruises around with men and women. Scott Lyons has turned to drink. Kristian Brooks and Lucas James are secret lovers.

In one scene, Chase and Lyons perform fellatio on each other in 1957 and anal penetration in 1962. In another, sexually frustrated married men Donovan and Young make love to each other in both years in the same basement, filled with pictures of naked women (In 1962, they are blindfolded though). In another scene, lovers Brooks and James engage in a threesome with Lawrence, who later leaves the two alone to let them penetrate each other. In another, after the basketball team loses often, the coach (Preston Richie) "locks up seven players in the locker room", where they create an orgy. Later, they win the basketball game. In the final scene, set in 1962, best friends Chase and Lawrence admit their feelings for each other and then have sex.

== Production ==
The movie was inspired by writer and director Jerry Douglas's own childhood in Iowa in the 1950s. It was produced by Scott Masters. The basement sex scene filled with naked pictures of women was inspired by Douglas's real-life sexual fantasies and his basement room that was filled with pictures of movie stars, including actors James Dean, Farley Granger and Montgomery Clift who sparked those fantasies.

== Reception ==
A reviewer from the Frisky Fans website praised the story, the acting and the directing with four and a half stars out of five. Keeneye Reeves from TLA Video called its story "incredibly hot and romantic" with all four stars. Frank Lee from Rad Video praised the performances, the writing and the story setting with five stars.

Giacomo Tramontagna from The Guide found the sex scenes "beautifully orchestrated", the movie an "instant classic" and "the best story-driven gay video in years" with four stars. Tramontagna said that Rick Chase in this video appears to resemble actor Farley Granger. Moreover, he found Chase's story with Scott Lyons more convincing than with Aaron Lawrence as "best friends".

Butch Harris from ManNet praised the movie with its coming-of-age tales as an "excellent period piece". Jeremy Spencer from GayVideoDad (part of the defunct Gay Chicago Magazine) called it the "best" and praised its acting, sexual performances, story and directing. Jeffrey Escoffier from his book Bigger Than Life called it "a historical allegory illustrating the significance of gay liberation." Escoffier compared the misery of closetedness among small-town boys in the 1950s and "sexual happiness" among them at their reunion in the 1960s.

In 2000, this film won GayVN Awards for Best Gay Video and Best Director (Jerry Douglas). It also won Grabby Awards for Best Romance Video and Best Romance Screenplay (Douglas). It also won Gay Erotic Video Awards for Best Gay Video, Best Screenplay (Douglas), Best Director (Douglas) and Best Non-Sexual Role (Preston Richie).
