= Black Spark (Russia) =

Russian anti-Putin armed resistance movement

- Чёрная искра
- Logo of Black Spark
- Leader: Igor Volobuev (public spokesperson)
- Dates active: 2025–present
- Country: Russia
- Allegiance: Special Operations Forces of Ukraine
- Active regions: Russia
- Ideology: Anti-Putinism
- Status: Active
- Wars: Russo-Ukrainian War

Black Spark (Russian: Чёрная искра, romanized: Chiornaya Iskra) is an underground resistance group operating inside Russia, claiming to work in coordination with Ukraine's Special Operations Forces (SOF) towards the violent overthrow of the Putin government and the disruption of Russian military and industrial infrastructure.

The group's membership, organizational structure, and the full extent of its claimed operations have not been independently verified.

== Background ==
Igor Volobuev, a former vice president of Gazprombank who defected to Ukraine following Russia's full-scale invasion in February 2022, has publicly identified himself as a spokesperson for the movement. Ukrainian SOF Command has officially confirmed coordination with Black Spark representatives.

== Operational history ==
On 28 September 2025, Black Spark along with Ukrainian SSO destroyed a Buk missile system and Nebo-SVU radar station in Russia's Rostov Oblast.

In October 2025, the Kinef oil refinery was attacked by Ukrainian Special Operations Forces in cooperation with Black Spark.

On 4 October 2025, a transport and loading vehicle for the 9K720 Iskander was destroyed in Kursk Oblast as well as a 1L122 "Garmon" radar station.

On 12 December, 2025 Ukraine's Special Operations Forces claimed the destruction of two Russian ships, Kompozitor Rakhmaninov and Askar-Saridzha, in the Caspian Sea off the coast of Kalmykia.

On 27 June 2026, the website for Alabuga Special Economic Zone was hacked, displaying a message from Black Spark. The group claimed to have extracted employee databases including personnel family members, residential addresses, and supply chain records. They also claimed to have sabotaged drone batches, stating operators would face "unpleasant consequences" upon launch attempts.

On 28 June 2026, the Yaroslavl refinery was hit by deep strike Ukrainian drones. Ukrainian National News reported the SSO carried out the strike in cooperation with Black Spark.

On 13 July Black Spark collaborated with the USF on a deep strike on the Gazprom Neftekhim Salavat oil refinery Saratov Oblast in Bashkortostan.

== See also ==
- Russo-Ukrainian War
- Russian partisan movement (2022–present)
- Special Operations Forces of Ukraine
- Atesh
- Freedom of Russia Legion
