= Seed Money: The Chuck Holmes Story =

Documentary film

Seed Money: The Chuck Holmes Story (2015) is a documentary film which follows the life of Chuck Holmes, the founder of gay pornography studio Falcon Studios. Its director was Michael Stabile, and the documentary premiered on April 10, 2015, at the Wicked Queer film festival, formerly known as the Boston LGBT Film Festival.

The documentary discusses Holmes's difficult relationship with the Democratic Party (which he supported) and philanthropic groups such as the Human Rights Campaign and the LGBTQ Victory Fund, as well as ways it says Holmes changed gay male beauty standards and modern gay pornography.

In the Los Angeles Times, Gary Goldstein noted that the film manages to squeeze in important context and history despite its short runtime.
