= Ukrainian National News =

Independent information agency

Ukrainian National News (Ukrainian: Українські національні новини) is an all-Ukrainian independent news agency. Its main topics are politics, social issues, and economics.

The agency's website has an operational news feed that is constantly updated. In addition to news content, the agency produces photo and video content, conducts live broadcasts, and provides information consulting services. The agency's website averages over 4 million monthly visitors. It is among the top 10 most visited news resources in Ukraine. The agency headquarters is located in the center of Kyiv on Khreshchatyk. It was created in 2007 and until 2011 was named as "InterMediaKonsaltynh" (Ukrainian: ІнтерМедіаКонсалтинг). In 2013, it appeared in Ukrainian mass media in connection with information related to the Kyiv city local government. At that time, it was owned by Dmytro Sahach.

== Management ==
The founder of the agency is Ulyana Ivanovna Lozan. Editor-in-chief is Elena Arkhipova.

== Sanctions ==
Starting in 2014, the site has been repeatedly banned in the Russian Federation. After the start of Russia's full-scale war in Ukraine, the IA UNN website was banned in the Russian Federation by decision of the Russian Prosecutor General's Office.
