= Al Parker =

American pornographic actor

- Born: Andrew Robert Okun; June 25, 1952; Natick, Massachusetts, USA
- Died: August 17, 1992 (aged 40)
- Occupations: Adult film actor, producer, director, model
- Known for: Gay pornography
- Partner: Steve Taylor (1973–1986)

Al Parker (born Andrew Robert Okun; June 25, 1952 – August 17, 1992) was a gay American porn star, producer, and director. He died from complications of AIDS at the age of 40.

== Early career ==
Parker was born in Natick, Massachusetts. After arriving in California, he was employed by Hugh Hefner at the Playboy Mansion West as a butler. His career in gay film started when he was "discovered" by Rip Colt, founder of Colt Studios. Colt gave him the performance name "Al Parker."

Parker began his filmmaking career when he signed with Brentwood Studios. He initially made short loop films shot on 8 mm reels. He also starred in films by Bijou Video, such as Games, Turbo Charge, and Turned On.

== Surge Studios ==
Parker was a producer, director, and actor. His company, Surge Studios, produced "theme" gay adult features, not just short loops. Many of the films were shot at Parker's home in Hermosa Beach, California. Surge Studios was one of the first studios to mandate safe sex practices when AIDS appeared.

== Personal life ==
In 1969, Parker's mother encouraged him to attend the Woodstock Music Festival, believing that it was a classical music festival. After he was forced to abandon his mother's new car in the mud along the road leading to the festival, he encountered what he regarded as his first wholly satisfying sexual experience. His picture was taken there and appears on the poster collage for the Woodstock concert film released in 1970.

Parker was one of the interview subjects of Dr. Dean Edell, who reported a surgical procedure that sought to restore Parker's foreskin from his at-birth circumcision. The surgery was performed by Dr. Ira Sharlip, a urologist. The report was broadcast on television.

== Death ==
Parker died in San Francisco in 1992 due to AIDS-related complications.

== Legacy ==
Parker is the subject of Roger Edmonson's biography Clone: The Life and Legacy of Al Parker Gay Superstar. Parker's life is depicted in playwright Drew Sachs' play, aka Al Parker.

Parker and his legacy on the gay community was the subject of a 2021 feature in GQ.

== Selected filmography ==
- The Best of Al Parker (2008)
- Overload (1992)
- The Best of Colt Films: Part 10 (1991)
- Better than Ever (1989)
- Best of Brentwood 1 (1987)
- Turbo Charge (1987)
- The Best of Colt: Part 4 (1986)
- Oversize Load (1986) (director only, with a cameo appearance)
- High Tech (1986)
- Daddies Plaything (1985)
- Century Mining (1985)
- Hard Disk Drive (1985)
- Outrage (1984), aka Christopher Rage's Outrage (US)
- Headtrips (1984)
- One in a Billion (1984)
- Rangers (1984)
- Strange Places, Strange Things (1984)
- Therapy (1983)
- Dangerous (1983)
- A Few Good Men (1983)
- Games (1983)
- The Other Side of Aspen (1978)
- Turned On (1982)
- Flashbacks, aka Al Parker's Flashback (1981)
- Wanted (1980)
- Inches (1979)
- Weekend Lockup (1977)
- Best of Buckshot (Compilations) Chute, Timberwolves
- Heavy Equipment (1977) – shot in 3D

== See also ==
- List of male performers in gay porn films
- Adult Erotic Gay Video Awards (Grabbys)
- Grabby recipients
- Discontinued gay pornography awards
- Gay Erotic Video Awards
- GayVN Awards
- List of gay porn movie studios
- List of gay porn magazines
