= Black Spark (director) =

American film director

Black Spark is an anonymous independent male American film director and photographer who is most noted for his hypersexualized music videos and unique surreal style. He began posting videos in the fourth quarter of 2010. He has stated in interviews that he is bisexual, that all videos are about his own sex life, and that he is influenced by art pornography from the 1970s.

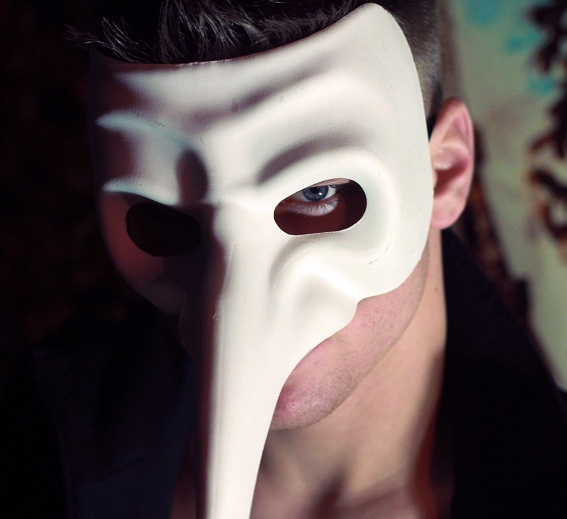
Black Spark

== Identity ==
Much speculation about his identity has been made. The Sword has identified him as Josh Stark, an adult film actor who has done scenes for a gay porn company called "CollegeDudes".

Black Spark has given reasons in interviews as to why he has chosen to be anonymous. His everyday real life is the opposite of Black Spark's hypersexualized life, he works on other projects, and he doesn't want the Black Spark identity to hinder his "large-scale future plans in film".

== Selected filmography ==
Black Spark Chapter 1: Music by Empire Of The Sun - "Swordfish Hotkiss Night"
Black Spark Chapter 1.5: Music by Bon Iver - "Woods"
Black Spark Chapter 2: Music by Yael Naïm - "Toxic" (Britney Spears Cover)
Dance In My Heart Now: Music by Groove Armada - "Cards To Your Heart"
Not Over You: Music by Chester French - "Not Over You"
Any Time You Like: Music by Robyn - "Any Time You Like"
Before The Kill: Music by Yeah Yeah Yeahs - "Maps"
For The Kill: Music by La Roux - "In For The Kill"
More The Kill: Music by Burial - "Fostercare" & JT and The Clouds - "Nobody Wants To Be Alone Nobody Wants To Die"
Merry Christmas: Music by William Fitzsimmons - "They’ll Never Take the Good Years"
Sun’s Gone Dim And Sky’s Turned Black: Music by Johann Johannsson - "The Sun’s Gone Dim And The Sky’s Turned Black"
Famous: Music by Jazmine Sullivan - "Famous"
Boners R Cool: Music by William Fitzsimmons - "Fade And Then Return"
Sunday Faith: Music by Frou Frou - "The Dumbing Down Of Love" & Lauryn Hill - "Tell Him"
Skin: Music by James Blake - "Wilhelm Scream"
