= Tubstrip =

Comedy play from 1973

Tubstrip Promotional Poster, Broadway Production, 1974

Tubstrip is a risqué comedy set in a gay bathhouse written by Jerry Douglas. The original production, also directed by Douglas, premiered off-Broadway in 1973, played in eight other cities, and then opened on Broadway in 1974 with adult film star Casey Donovan in the lead role.

== Overview ==
Tubstrip is an erotic farce taking place in a New York City gay bathhouse over the course of a single evening. The main character is the bathhouse attendant Brian, who is desired by three other characters: the witty queen Andy, the naïve and romantic Richie, and the “straight” military man Bob. Other patrons contributing to the sexual pursuits, complicated by secrets and mistaken identities, include an S&M couple, a hustler, and a porn director. Brian, who had a crush on Bob in high school, eagerly awaits his arrival, but once he realizes that Bob is married, closeted, and won't commit to more than a secret weekend fling, Brian rejects him and opts instead for the possibility of romance with Richie.

== Production history ==
Tubstrip was written (under the pseudonym A. J. Kronengold) and directed (under the pseudonym Doug Richards) by Jerry Douglas.

The play premiered off-Broadway on May 17, 1973, at the Brecht Theatre in the Mercer Arts Center, where it played 100 performances before the building housing the theatre collapsed. The production reopened for 40 more performances at the Players Theatre and then went on tour, performing in eight cities, including Boston, Washington, DC, Philadelphia, Toronto, Chicago, Detroit, Los Angeles, and San Francisco.

Adult film actor Casey Donovan, performing under the name Calvin Culver, took over the lead role of Brian in Los Angeles and remained with the show when it returned to the Mayfair Theatre in New York City. The Broadway production of Tubstrip ran from October 18 to November 17, 1974, for 16 preview and 21 regular performances.

Two actors who remained with the production for the entire run of approximately 500 performances were Walter Holiday (Andy) and Jake Everett (Wally). Other actors who performed for portions of the run include Rick Cassidy, Michael Kearns, Eddie Rambeau, Dean Tait, Gerald Grant, and Dick Joslyn.

The script of the play was published for the first time in 2019 by Chelsea Station Editions, edited and with a foreword by Jordan Schildcrout.

== Critical reception ==
Lee Barton of The Advocate saw the 1973 off-Broadway production of Tubstrip as a welcome departure from plays that “exploit, degrade, insult, or distort what it’s like to be gay.” He praised Tubstrip as “funny, sexy, [and] important,” but wondered whether mainstream critics could “tolerate anything gay that is so open and healthy.” Other critics, including Vito Russo, found the play exploitative because of the frequent nudity of the actors.

While some regional critics wrote dismissive reviews of the touring production, others praised Tubstrip as “a comic statement about love” and “the first of its kind to reach Philadelphia… asserting as it does not the sickness but the validity of homosexual affection and homoerotic appeal.”

Critics gave the Broadway production mixed to poor reviews. Many claimed that the play was not for heterosexual audiences, with dialogue that “might be virtually a foreign language” to the “straight intruder.” One exception was Debbi Wasserman of Show Business who stated, “Tubstrip is not for everyone, but it comes pretty close. It’s not for the prejudiced puritan, but it is for the romantic.”

In 2017, theatre scholar Jordan Schildcrout brought renewed attention to Tubstrip, reclaiming the play as central to the mostly forgotten wave of “gay erotic theatre” that emerged in the early years of the gay liberation movement (1969–1974). He notes the play's “combination of sexual exuberance and romantic longing,” stating that “even as it celebrates sexual liberation, Tubstrip dramatizes many of the tensions evident in the emerging gay sexual culture, between sex and romance, promiscuity and monogamy, sadomasochism and consent, competition and community.”
