= Jack Weston =

American actor (1924–1996)

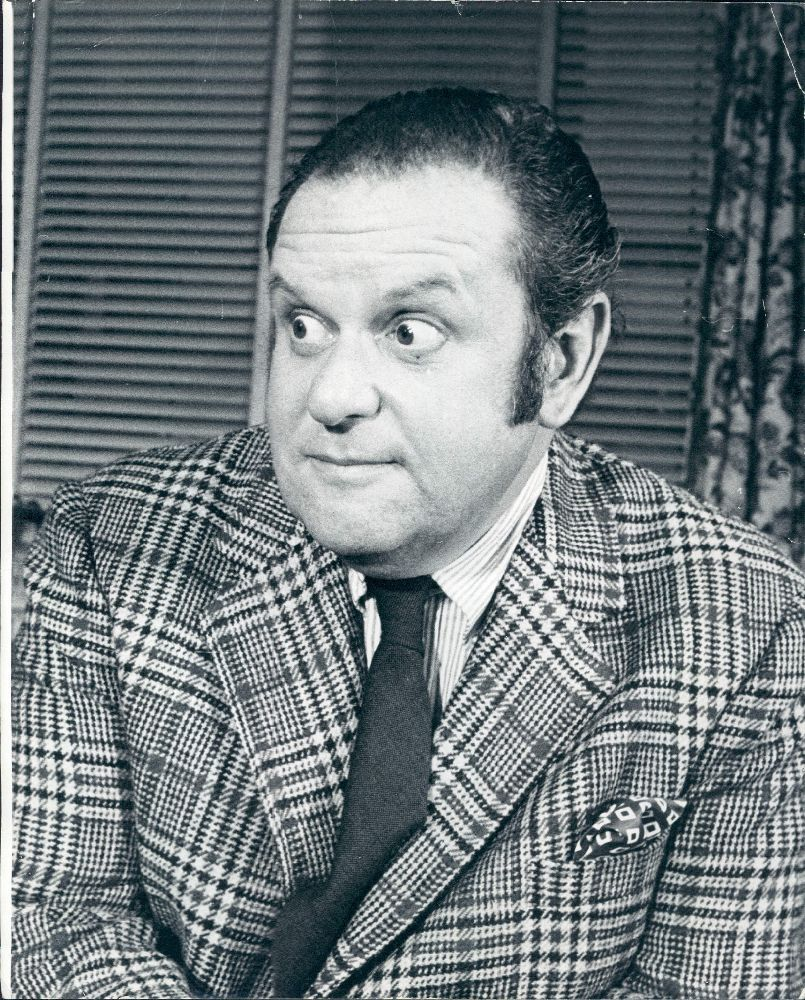
- Weston in 1971
- Born: Morris Weinstein; August 21, 1924; Cleveland, Ohio, U.S.
- Died: May 3, 1996 (aged 71); New York City, New York, U.S.
- Occupation: Actor
- Years active: 1949–1988
- Spouses: Marge Redmond (m. 1950; div. 198?); Laurie Gilkes (m. 1993)
- Children: 1
- Relatives: Anthony Spinelli (brother); Mitchell Spinelli (nephew)

Jack Weston (born Morris Weinstein; August 21, 1924 – May 3, 1996) was an American actor. One obituary described him as a "chubby, bejowled actor who elevated anguish to a comic art." He was nominated for a Golden Globe Award for Best Actor in a Motion Picture – Musical or Comedy for his performance in The Ritz (1976), and a Tony Award for Best Actor in a Play for The Floating Light Bulb (1981).

== Early life ==
Weston was born Morris Weinstein to a Jewish family in Cleveland, Ohio. His younger brother, Sam, was also an actor who later became a director of adult films under the stage name Anthony Spinelli.

He was drafted into the U.S. Army during World War II, serving as a machine gunner in the 34th Infantry Division in Italy and North Africa. After his discharge, he moved to New York City, and American Theatre Wing in New York with Lee Strasberg. He did not advance far professionally and returned to Cleveland, where he met Marge Redmond, another local actress, at the Cleveland Play House. The pair relocated to New York and were married there in 1950.

== Career ==
Weston usually played comic roles in films such as Cactus Flower (1969) and Please Don't Eat the Daisies (1960). He occasionally took on heavier parts, such as the scheming crook and stalker, who along with Alan Arkin and Richard Crenna attempted to terrorize and rob a blind Audrey Hepburn in the 1967 film Wait Until Dark.

Weston had numerous other character roles over 25 years, including in major films such as The Cincinnati Kid (1965), The Thomas Crown Affair (1968), Gator (1976), Cuba (1979), High Road to China (1983), Dirty Dancing (1987), Ishtar (1987), and Short Circuit 2 (1988)

On television, he made numerous appearances, such as Fred Calvert in the 1958 Perry Mason episode, "The Case of the Daring Decoy". In 1961, he was a guest star in the TV drama Route 66, playing the manager of a traveling group of young women nightclub dancers who mistreats his employees. He co-starred with Peggy Cass in the series The Hathaways, in which they served as "parents" to a trio of performing chimpanzees. In 1963, he was a guest star in an episode called "Fatso" in the TV drama The Fugitive.

In 1976, he was nominated for a Golden Globe Award for Best Actor in a Motion Picture – Musical or Comedy for his performance in the film The Ritz. In 1981, Weston appeared on Broadway in Woody Allen's comedy The Floating Light Bulb, for which he was nominated for a Tony Award as Best Actor. His other stage appearances include Bells are Ringing in 1956 (with Judy Holliday), The Ritz in 1975, Neil Simon's California Suite (1976) and One Night Stand in 1980.

Weston co-starred in Alan Alda's 1981 film The Four Seasons, and then reprised his role to star in a television series spinoff on CBS.

== Personal life ==
Weston's first wife Marge Redmond was later noted for her role in the ABC sitcom The Flying Nun. They occasionally appeared together, an example being a 1963 episode of The Twilight Zone titled "The Bard". Redmond and Weston divorced in the 1980s. The couple had no children.

Weston's second marriage was to Laurie Gilkes, and they had one child together. They were married until his death.

=== Death ===
Weston died from lymphoma on May 3, 1996, after a six-year struggle. He was 71 years old.

== Selected filmography ==
- Stage Struck (1958) as Frank
- Peter Gunn (1958) (Season 1 Episode 1: "The Kill") as Dave Green
- I Want to Live! (1958) as NCO at Party (uncredited)
- Steve Canyon (1959) as Smiley
- Imitation of Life (1959) as Tom
- Alfred Hitchcock Presents (1960) (Season 5 Episode 28: "Forty Detectives Later") as Otto
- Please Don't Eat the Daisies (1960) as Joe Positano
- All in a Night's Work (1961) as Lasker
- The Honeymoon Machine (1961) as Signalman Burford Taylor
- It's Only Money (1962) as Leopold
- Palm Springs Weekend (1963) as Coach Fred Campbell
- The Incredible Mr. Limpet (1964) as George Stickle
- The Cincinnati Kid (1965) as Pig
- Mirage (1965) as Lester
- Wait Until Dark (1967) as Carlino
- The Thomas Crown Affair (1968) as Erwin Weaver
- The April Fools (1969) as Potter Shrader
- Cactus Flower (1969) as Harvey Greenfield
- A New Leaf (1971) as Andy McPherson
- Fuzz (1972) as Detective Meyer Meyer
- Marco (1973) as Maffio Polo
- The Ritz (1976) as Gaetano Proclo
- Gator (1976) as Irving Greenfield
- Cuba (1979) as Larry Gutman
- Can't Stop the Music (1980) as Benny Murray
- The Four Seasons (1981) as Danny Zimmer
- High Road to China (1983) as Struts
- The Longshot (1986) as Elton
- Rad (1986) as Duke Best
- Dirty Dancing (1987) as Max Kellerman
- Ishtar (1987) as Marty Freed
- Short Circuit 2 (1988) as Oscar Baldwin

== Television appearances ==
In 1949, Weston appeared as Mr. Storm in episode five of Captain Video and His Video Rangers.

In 1953-54, he appeared as Wilbur Wormser on CBS-TV's Rod Brown of the Rocket Rangers, a Saturday-morning kiddie show, and he was often recognized on the street or subway by children in and around New York City.

In 1960, Weston appeared as Otto in Alfred Hitchcock Presents, episode 28, season five, called "Forty Detectives", on April 24, 1960.

In the 1960–1961 television season, Weston appeared as Chick Adams, a reporter, on the CBS sitcom My Sister Eileen.

Weston starred in the short-lived sitcom The Hathaways (ABC), in which Peggy Cass and he adopted three chimpanzees (the Marquis Chimps).

He also made guest appearances on such television series as Peter Gunn, Perry Mason, Rescue 8, The Twilight Zone (episodes "The Monsters Are Due on Maple Street", and "The Bard"), The Untouchables, Have Gun – Will Travel, Johnny Staccato, Thriller, The Lawless Years (three episodes: The Al Brown Story, and Louy K, part three: 'Birth of the Organization and The Kid Dropper Story), Route 66, Harrigan and Son, Stoney Burke, Breaking Point, The Fugitive, Bewitched, Gunsmoke, Twelve O'Clock High, Laredo, Tales of the Unexpected, The Man from U.N.C.L.E., The Carol Burnett Show, All in the Family, and The George Burns and Gracie Allen Show.
