= The Four Seasons (1981 film) =

1981 film by Alan Alda

- Theatrical release poster
- Directed by: Alan Alda
- Written by: Alan Alda
- Produced by: Martin Bregman
- Starring: Alan Alda; Carol Burnett; Len Cariou; Sandy Dennis; Rita Moreno; Jack Weston; Bess Armstrong
- Cinematography: Victor J. Kemper
- Edited by: Michael Economou
- Production company: Universal Pictures
- Distributed by: Universal Pictures
- Release dates: April 30, 1981 (Denver); May 22, 1981 (United States)
- Running time: 107 minutes
- Country: United States
- Language: English
- Budget: $6.5 million
- Box office: $50.4 million

The Four Seasons is a 1981 American romantic comedy-drama film written and directed by Alan Alda, starring Alda, Carol Burnett, Len Cariou, Sandy Dennis, Rita Moreno, Jack Weston, and Bess Armstrong. It draws its title from the four concerti composed by Antonio Vivaldi. Those compositions, along with others by Vivaldi, constitute the musical score.

== Plot ==
Three middle-class married couples – Jack and Kate Burroughs; Nick and Anne Callan; Danny and Claudia Zimmer – live in New York City and are close friends. Jack is a moralistic lawyer, Kate a Fortune magazine editor, Nick an insurance salesman and estate planner, Anne a housewife and photographer who photographs mostly vegetables, Danny a cheap dentist who displays symptoms of obsessive-compulsive disorder and hypochondriasis, and Claudia a blunt-spoken Italian painter. Quarterly (in each of the four seasons), the three couples go on vacations planned by Kate.

=== Spring ===
In May, the six friends go to Nick's and Anne's weekend cottage in the forest to celebrate Nick and Anne's anniversary. The husbands cook Chinese food and go bike racing, while the wives discuss Anne's latest photos.

While gathering firewood, Nick reveals to Jack how unhappy he is being married to Anne so he plans to divorce her, wanting a woman who can excite him. When Jack asks if another woman is involved, Nick denies it. That night, Kate is devastated when Jack tells her of Nick's intentions, and both worry about Anne.

=== Summer ===
Nick has separated from Anne and is dating Ginny Newley, a younger, beautiful, naive woman. The Burroughses and Zimmers are not impressed with Nick giving Ginny a new present daily and her believing all of his stories. All three couples, except Anne, spend the summer on a sailboat around St. Thomas.

During their vacation, the sailboat gets stuck in a sandbar, and the Burroughses and Zimmers are unable to sleep well due to Nick and Ginny's loud sexual encounters every night. When the group gets the sailboat unstuck and resumes the journey, the Burroughses privately discuss how Nick and Ginny's relationship is affecting the others. After witnessing Nick and Ginny skinny-dipping in the sea, the Zimmers join them.

=== Autumn ===
In fall, the group rides Danny's new Mercedes-Benz to Connecticut to spend Parents' Weekend with two of the couples' daughters: Beth Burroughs and Lisa Callan. While checking in to the university inn, the couples awkwardly encounter Anne, who is also there to spend time with Lisa. Kate and Claudia apologize to her for not inviting her to their previous vacations, as Nick is bringing Ginny. Anne, who has become depressed over their separation, tells them she is moving on by trying new things such as vacationing in Czechoslovakia and adopting a snake. Beth reveals to her mother that despite being childhood friends, she and Lisa are no longer close.

Meanwhile, Danny has become increasingly upset with Claudia's insensitivity to others, which she blames on her Italian heritage and refuses to apologize. Nick cannot cheer up Lisa, who has become withdrawn and unhappy over her parents' separation. Danny reveals to Jack that Nick is a womanizer, having secretly cheated on Anne with multiple other women. During a game of soccer, Jack bruises his knee from tackling Nick, with whom he is becoming estranged. That night, the Burroughses fight about Nick and Ginny, and Kate confesses she hates planning the group's quarterly vacations.

=== Winter ===
The Callans have divorced, with Nick marrying Ginny and Anne becoming a magazine photographer. In winter, the three couples vacation at a ski resort, where they rent a lodge. A skiing match between Nick and Jack results in the former breaking an ankle and the latter tearing his ligament. To cheer everyone up, Ginny invites the others to a bar. When Danny's friends laugh at his hypochondria, Ginny surprisingly defends him.

When they return to the lodge, Kate inadvertently upsets Ginny by saying she will never understand the group. Ginny calls them out for not accepting her, then leaves the lodge. Despite his lack of concern, Nick reveals that Ginny is pregnant. The group argues again, culminating in Jack breaking some things before Kate calms him down.

When Ginny still has not returned by morning, Danny goes to look for her. He finds her jogging but accidentally falls through thin ice. Ginny runs back to the lodge to get Danny help. Driving Danny's Mercedes-Benz to rescue him, they carelessly drive it onto the ice, it falls through, quickly sinking under the surface. The friends reconcile and walk back to the lodge, with Kate jokingly saying they should all return next winter.

== Characters ==
- Jack Burroughs (Alan Alda), a lawyer who is happily married to Kate. He enjoys asking deep and probing questions and then volunteering an answer. Jack is moralistic, expressing disapproval of Nick for leaving his wife. He competes with the more athletic Nick in dirtbike racing, soccer, and skiing. His friends and wife consider him too judgmental at times. Instead of keeping true feelings to themselves, Jack thinks it is better for everyone to clear the air, when some feelings could be better off hidden.
- Kate Burroughs (Carol Burnett), an editor for Fortune magazine. She suspects that her husband has fantasies of being worshipped by an attractive, younger woman the way Nick has. Since she comes across as well-organized and even perfect, Kate can feel invisible and neglected.
- Nick Callan (Len Cariou), an insurance salesman and estate planner. He is bored with his wife Anne and divorces her. He admits to Jack that he wants a woman who can excite him. Ginny, a younger woman, begins joining him on seasonal vacations with the Burroughses and Zimmers. Although his four friends disapprove, Nick is happy. Ginny marries him and becomes pregnant with his child.
- Anne Callan (Sandy Dennis), a housewife, mother, and aspiring photographer. She takes pleasure in taking photos of vegetables, much to Nick's chagrin. After being left for a younger woman, Anne falls into depression. She believes that both Kate and Claudia deserted her following her divorce. To break out of her rut, Anne attempts to try new (but unusual) things such as buying a snake and planning a vacation to Czechoslovakia. Eventually she is able to support herself as a magazine photographer (taking "pictures of people, not kumquats," as Nick observes).
- Danny Zimmer (Jack Weston), a dentist and Claudia's husband. He shares with his male friends a passion for cooking and exotic dishes. He is oldest of the group and fears that he is approaching death. This has prompted diet changes and even irrational fears, like pressing strange elevator buttons. Danny can be quite cheap when it comes to money and often displays symptoms of obsessive-compulsive disorder.
- Claudia Zimmer (Rita Moreno), an accomplished painter. She can be quite outspoken, even to the point of being insensitive to others. Whenever her candor is criticized, Claudia refuses to apologize and cites her heritage ("I'm Italian!"). She expresses the desire to feel in love the way Nick does with Ginny. After witnessing Nick and Ginny swim naked, Claudia and Danny try it themselves.
- Ginny Newley (Bess Armstrong), a young woman who begins a relationship with Nick after meeting him on a flight. She is attractive, bubbly, and a bit naive. She is in awe of the older Nick, whom she regards as quite accomplished. Although the Burroughses and Zimmers resent her as "the other woman," they eventually accept her as a friend. Ginny defends Danny when the group mocks him for his irrational fears. Ginny marries Nick and she becomes pregnant with his child.
- Lisa Callan (Beatrice Alda), Nick and Anne's daughter. Her parents' divorce greatly affected her and caused her to become sullen, withdrawn, and isolated at school. Lisa confesses her unhappiness to her father, who is unable to cheer her up.
- Beth Burroughs (Elizabeth Alda), Jack and Kate's daughter. She attends college at the University of Vermont and is an excellent student. Noting her upbeat attitude, Danny observes that she "takes a real bite out of life." Beth's relationship with Lisa, a classmate, has deteriorated at college.

== Release ==
The film had its premiere at the Denver International Film Festival on April 30, 1981, before opening May 22.

== Reception ==
The Four Seasons was a critical and box office success. Produced on a budget of $6.5 million, the film grossed $50,427,646, making it the ninth highest-grossing film of 1981. On the review aggregator website Rotten Tomatoes, the film holds an approval rating of 68% based on 19 reviews, with an average rating of 6.1/10.

The film also renewed interest in the Vivaldi concerti after which it was named and which its musical score included.

=== Accolades ===
Award	Category	Recipient(s)	Result	Ref.
Bodil Awards	Best Non-European Film	Alan Alda	Won	
Golden Globe Awards	Best Motion Picture – Musical or Comedy		Nominated	
Golden Globe Awards	Best Actor in a Motion Picture – Musical or Comedy	Alan Alda	Nominated	
Golden Globe Awards	Best Actress in a Motion Picture – Musical or Comedy	Carol Burnett	Nominated	
Golden Globe Awards	Best Screenplay – Motion Picture	Alan Alda	Nominated	
Writers Guild of America Awards	Best Comedy – Written Directly for the Screen	Alan Alda	Nominated	

== Spin-offs ==
The film spawned a CBS series in 1984 produced by Alda and starring Jack Weston and Tony Roberts.

The film was adapted by Tina Fey, Lang Fisher, and Tracey Wigfield into a Netflix TV series of the same name. Among others, it stars Fey and Steve Carell.
