= Jerry Douglas (director) =

American pornographic film director

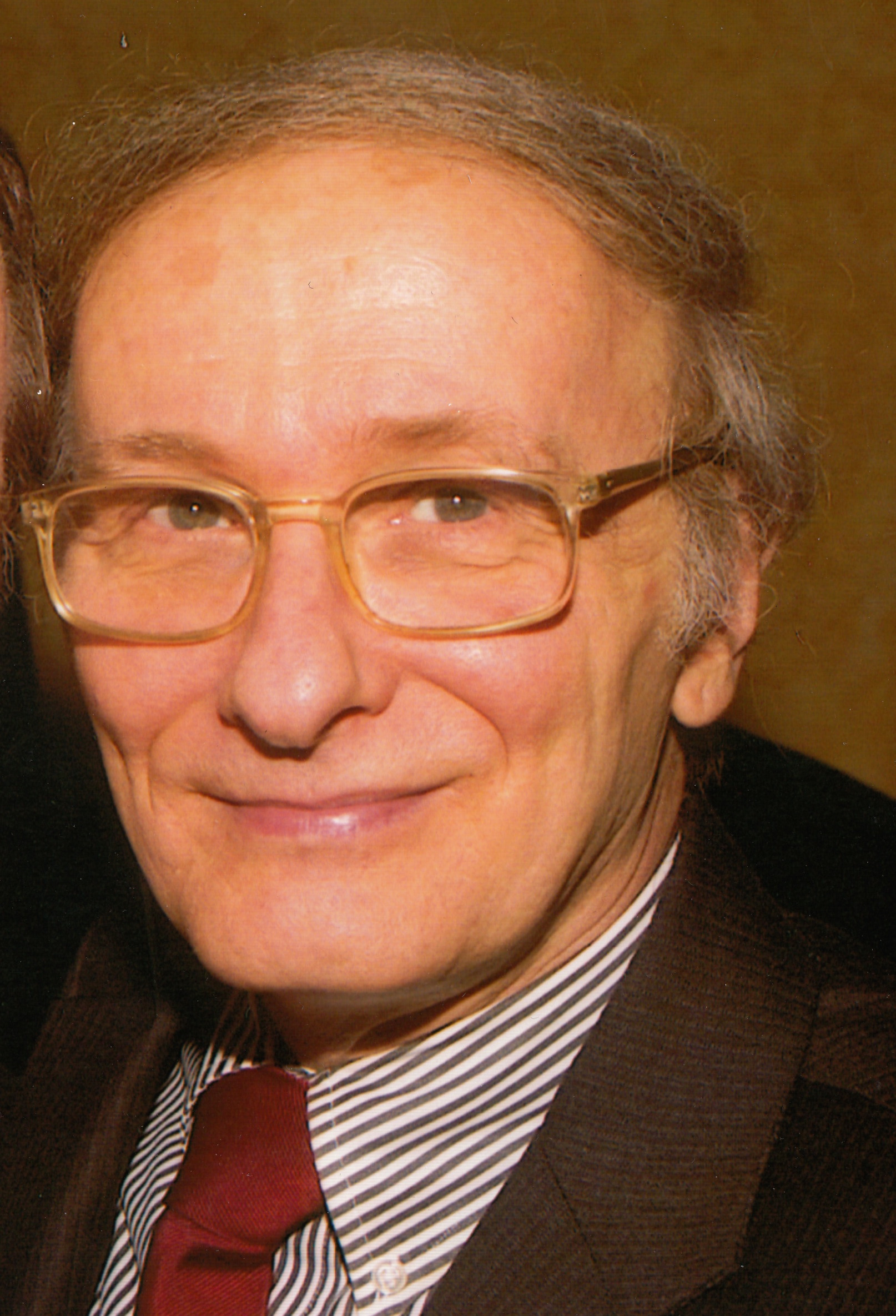
- Born: November 15, 1935; Des Moines, Iowa, U.S.
- Died: January 9, 2021 (aged 85)
- Other name: Doug Richards
- Occupations: Theatre and film director, author

Jerry Douglas (November 15, 1935 – January 9, 2021) was an American film director and screenwriter, notably of gay pornographic films, as well as a novelist, playwright, and theatre director. He wrote and directed the play Tubstrip, which appeared on Broadway in 1974, starring Casey Donovan. His cinematic work won numerous adult film industry awards, and he was inducted into the Grabby Awards Hall of Fame and the GayVN Awards Hall of Fame.

== Career ==
A native of Des Moines, Iowa, Douglas attended Drake University and did his graduate work at the Yale School of Drama. Among the Broadway and Off-Broadway plays he wrote and/or directed are Rondelay, Circle in the Water, Score, Tubstrip, Max's Millions, and most recently, the New York and Los Angeles productions of The Deep Throat Sex Scandal. He also wrote the screenplay for Radley Metzger's film version of Score. In the early 1970s, he directed two adult films, The Back Row (starring Casey Donovan and George Payne) and Both Ways (starring Andrea True and Gerald Grant), then left the industry to focus on his career as a free-lance journalist and editor for such publications as The Advocate, Update, FirstHand, and Stallion.

He did not make another film until 1989, when he was urged out of his self-imposed retirement by Rick Ford of All Worlds Video. Between 1989 and 2007, he made on average one film per year, six of which were named Best Picture by industry organizations such as the Adult Video New Awards, Gay Video Guide Awards, and the Grabby Awards: More of a Man, Kiss-Off, Honorable Discharge, Flesh and Blood, Dream Team, and BuckleRoos. Five of the actors who played leading roles in his productions have been named Best Actor: Tim Lowe (Fratrimony), Joey Stefano (More of a Man), Michael Brawn (Kiss-Off), Kurt Young (Flesh and Blood), and Dean Phoenix (BuckleRoos).

== Published works ==
Douglas was the creator and editor of Manshots magazine from 1988 to 2001. His collection of short stories, Mantalk, was published in 1991. His first novel, The Legend of the Ditto Twins was published by Bruno Gmünder Verlag of Berlin, Germany, in 2012. In 2019, Chelsea Station Editions published his play, Tubstrip, with a foreword by theatre scholar Jordan Schildcrout.

In 2021, Douglas (with co-editor Jeffrey Escoffier) published two massive books: "Directing Sex: Interviews with the Directors of Gay Pornography" (475 pages; interviews with more than 30 directors, including William Huggins, Kristen Bjorn, Chi Chi LaRue, Steven Scarborough, Dirk Yates, John Rutherford, George Duroy, etc.) and "Close-Up: Interviews with the Performers of Gay Pornography" (285 pages, interviews with more than 60 performers including Peter Berlin, Scorpio, Leo Ford, Kevin Williams, Richard Locke, Ken Ryker, Jeff Palmer, etc.) These are all interviews Douglas conducted and originally ran in "Manshots" over the years.

In June 2022, Seidelman & Company published "The Collected Gay History Novels of Jerry Douglas," including Son and Heir, Lesser Evils, and Fixing Matthew.

== Personal life ==
Douglas lived in New York City, where he married his partner of forty years, attorney John Stellar, in November 2011. He died on January 9, 2021, at the age of 85.

== Plays ==
- Never Say Dye (1964) – director, book writer, lyricist
- Rondelay (1969) – book writer, lyricist
- Circle in the Water (1970) – director, adapter
- Score (1970) – director, playwright
- Tubstrip (1973) – director, playwright [under pseudonym A. J. Kronengold]
- Max's Millions (1985) – director, co-author with Raymond Wood
- The Deep Throat Sex Scandal (2010) – director

== Films ==
- The Back Row (1973) [under pseudonym Doug Richards]
- Score (1974) [screenwriter only]
- Both Ways (1975)
- Fratrimony (1989)
- More of a Man (1991)
- Trade-Off (1992)
- Kiss-Off (1992)
- Jock-A-Holics (1993)
- Honorable Discharge (1993)
- The Diamond Stud (1995)
- Flesh & Blood (1996)
- Family Values (1997)
- Dream Team (1999)
- Top Secret (2000)
- BuckleRoos Part 1 (2004)
- BuckleRoos Part 2 (2004)
- Beyond Perfect (2005)
- Brotherhood (2007)

== Published works ==
- Mantalk (FirstHand, 1991)
- The Legend of the Ditto Twins (Bruno Gmünder Verlag, 2012)
- Tubstrip (Chelsea Station Editions, 2019)
- Directing Sex: Interviews with the Directors of Gay Pornography (Editors Moustache, 2021)
- Close-Up: Interviews with the Performers of Gay Pornography (Editors Moustache, 2021)
- Son and Heir (Seidelman & Company 2022)
- Lesser Evils (Seidelman & Company 2022)
- Fixing Matthew (Seidelman & Company 2022)

== Critical analysis ==
Mandy Merck's Perversions: Deviant Readings (1993) includes the chapter "More of A Man: Gay Porn Cruises Gay Politics," analyzing the intersection of gay political activism and pornography in Douglas' 1991 film.

Media scholar Jeffrey Escoffier describes Douglas' 1973 film The Back Row as the first example of homorealist gay pornographic cinema, which "created a synthesis of a documentary-like view (in this case focusing on the gay sexual subculture) and the more psychopolitical themes of sexual liberation."

Theatre scholar Jordan Schildcrout discusses Douglas' 1973 play Tubstrip, a comedy set in a gay bathhouse that ran for approximately 500 performances, as the most widely seen example of gay erotic theatre, a theatrical sub-genre in the early years of gay liberation, which offered "the most exuberant and affirming depictions of same-sex sexuality heretofore seen in the American theatre."
