= Jack Shamama =

American film producer

Jack Shamama (born June 24, 1974) is an American author, producer, screenwriter, blogger, and social critic who is best known for his work in the LGBT community and in gay pornography. Born in Brooklyn, New York and raised in Miami, Florida, Shamama graduated from Wesleyan University and later moved to San Francisco, where he lives today. Since 2008, he has been the product manager for gay adult video-on-demand membership site Naked Sword, where he is concurrently producing the independent art-porn feature film, I Want Your Love.

== Career ==
From 2001 to 2003, Shamama served as the Arts & Entertainment editor for Gay.com, where he interviewed celebrities such as JT Leroy and Rufus Wainwright.

In 2004, he became the editor of GayPornBlog.com, which the adult industry trade publication Cybersocket Magazine honored as the Best Adult Blog in 2005, 2006, 2007, and 2008. Shamama was also honored with a GayVN Award in 2005 for Best Screenplay for his work with co-writer Michael Stabile on the first-ever gay pornographic soap opera, Wet Palms. Shamama's other credits as screenwriter include the Falcon Studios titles Dare (in which he also appeared on-screen in a non-sexual role), Spokes III, Cross Country, and Pledgemaster: The Hazing. In addition to his screenwriting for Falcon, Shamama was also the product manager for the studio from 2005 to 2008 before leaving to assume his current role as product manager and producer at Naked Sword.

As a producer, Shamama worked with Stabile and cinematographer Ben Leon on the documentary short Smut Capital of America, which premiered at the Tribeca Film Festival in New York. Shamama, Stabile, and Leon are also in the midst of filming the feature-length documentary on Falcon Studios' founder and GLBT philanthropist Charles M. Holmes.

Outside of pornography, Shamama has found success as an author and irreverent micro-blogger. His short story, "Spatial Devices Can Take Any Form," was included in the Dennis Cooper-edited anthology Userlands. In a favorable review, writer Kevin Killian called the short story "Syd Field form gone bananas." Shamama's Tumblr blog is known for its avant garde interpretation of culture and society as well as its celebration of internet memes with the use of original GIFs and other photo illustrations.

== Social commentary ==
Shamama's critiques and observations on technology, adult entertainment, and social networking have been featured in numerous publications and websites. Upon the release of Apple's iPhone in 2007, Shamama—a devoted Apple consumer—was interviewed by Gawker and Fox News. The Wall Street Journal turned to him for a piece on ornate furniture. The Bay Area Reporter sought out Shamama for his take on the explosion of social networking sites, particularly within the gay community. And as an arbiter of trends in the gay adult industry, Shamama has been a guest panelist at the 2010 Good Vibrations Indie Erotic Film Festival as well as a featured consultant and interviewee for stories on controversial "incest porn" and the exploration of porn stars' sexual techniques.

== I Want Your Love ==
Shamama produced I Want Your Love, a feature film from director Travis Mathews. A demo scene from the forthcoming film premiered to critical acclaim in the summer of 2010, and was awarded a "Best of the Bay" award by The San Francisco Bay Guardian. The demo scene was screened at international film festivals throughout 2010, and the feature version of I Want Your Love was shot in March 2011. The full-length film was released in 2012. Criticized in Variety and controversially banned at LGBT Australian film festivals by the Australian Classification Board for gratuitous, real, sex scenes by amateur actors.
