= The Ritz (film) =

1976 film by Richard Lester

- The theatrical release poster by Al Hirschfeld
- Directed by: Richard Lester
- Written by: Terrence McNally
- Based on: The Ritz; 1975 play by Terrence McNally
- Produced by: Denis O'Dell
- Starring: Jack Weston; Rita Moreno; Jerry Stiller; Kaye Ballard; F. Murray Abraham; Paul B. Price; Treat Williams
- Cinematography: Paul Wilson
- Edited by: John Bloom
- Music by: Ken Thorne
- Distributed by: Warner Bros. Pictures
- Release date: 12 August 1976
- Running time: 91 minutes
- Countries: United Kingdom; United States
- Language: English

The Ritz is a 1976 British-American comedy farce film directed by Richard Lester based on the 1975 play of the same name by Terrence McNally. Actress Rita Moreno – who had won a Tony Award for her performance as Googie Gomez in the Broadway production – and many others from the 1975 original cast, such as Jack Weston, Jerry Stiller, and F. Murray Abraham, reprised their stage roles in the film version. Also in the cast were Kaye Ballard and Treat Williams. The film, Jack Weston, and Rita Moreno all received Golden Globe nominations in the comedy category. It opened to mixed reviews.

It was shot at Twickenham Studios in London with sets designed by the art director Philip Harrison.

== Plot ==
Gaetano Proclo, a heterosexual, checks into the Ritz, a gay bathhouse in Manhattan, to hide from his homicidal brother-in-law, mobster Carmine Vespucci—whose name he uses on the register. As he checks in, Gaetano meets Googie Gomez, a third-rate entertainer who mistakes him for a famous producer. Unbeknownst to him, Carmine has hired Michael Brick, a squeaky-voiced detective, to track down Gaetano.

When he arrives at his hotel room, Gaetano is sexually propositioned by Claude Perkins, whom he later remembers from their time in the U.S. Army. Gaetano accuses Claude of being a "chubby chaser" and Claude later invites him for sex. As he avoids Claude, Gaetano meets another guest, Chris, and follows him to the sauna. There, he reencounters Googie, whom Gaetano mistakes for being a drag queen. As she prepares for her act, Googie states she has been fired during rehearsals by Seymour Pippin, a Broadway producer.

Gaetano attends Googie's poolside act, which she performs with two go-go boys Tiger and Duff. During the act, Gaetano runs out when Claude finds him. Backstage, Claude trips over an electric wire, which ruins Googie's act. Angered, Googie finds Claude near the sauna and throws him down the laundry chute. Meanwhile, Carmine has arrived at the Ritz. Beleaguered, Gaetano wants to leave for Central Park, but Michael brings Gaetano to his hotel room. Chris and Googie also arrive at Michael's hotel room, where Gaetano learns that not only has Carmine arrived, but Googie is actually a woman. Carmine is knocked unconscious, and Gaetano learns his brother-in-law's scheme to kill him to prevent him from inheriting half of the family estate.

Gaetano soon learns his wife Vivian is arriving at the Ritz. Claude helps Gaetano to hide while he brings Vivian into his room. Carmine wakes up and accuses the guests of molesting his sister. Enraged, he holds the poolside attendants at gunpoint and forces them into the pool, in hopes of finding Gaetano. Eventually, Gaetano reveals himself, to which Vivian is shocked to see her husband dressed effeminately. Before they leave, it's discovered that Carmine has secretly owned the Ritz as the patriarch acquired it before his death.

Although Gaetano and Carmine reconcile, Gaetano has Carmine forcibly brought into the sauna. Disappointed at not meeting an actual producer, Googie is told that Michael's uncle is a stage producer holding auditions for a dinner theatre, who turns out to be Seymour Pippin. Carmine, dressed in drag, is later arrested by the police while Gaetano and Vivian leave the Ritz.

== Cast ==
- Jack Weston as Gaetano Proclo
- Rita Moreno as Googie Gomez
- Jerry Stiller as Carmine Vespucci
- Kaye Ballard as Vivian Proclo
- F. Murray Abraham as Chris
- Paul B. Price as Claude Perkins
- Treat Williams as Michael Brick
- John Everson as Tiger
- Christopher J. Brown as Duff
- Dave King as Abe Lefkowitz
- Bessie Love as Maurine
- John Ratzenberger as patron

== Reception ==
Rotten Tomatoes reports that 62% of 13 surveyed critics gave the film a positive review; the average rating was 5.3/10.

Roger Ebert of the Chicago Sun-Times gave the film two-and-a-half stars out of four and wrote that it "never quite succeeds. Its ambition is clearly to be a screwball comedy in the tradition of the 1930s classics and such recent attempts as What's Up, Doc? and Silent Movie. But it lacks the manic pacing, and the material grows thin." Richard Eder of The New York Times wrote that the film "does work to some degree" but the "acting is often more energetic than funny."

Arthur D. Murphy of Variety wrote "Depending on where one's taste lies, The Ritz is either esoteric farce for the urban cosmopolite, or else one long tasteless and anachronistic Fiftyish 'gay' joke. Richard Lester's latest effort is, more accurately, an uneven combination of both extremes." Gene Siskel gave the film three stars out of four and wrote that "a good chunk of the film's humor seems forced... But 'The Ritz' grows on you as the film progresses." Penelope Gilliatt of The New Yorker thought that unlike the play, "some binding poignancy is missing from the film" because Richard Lester, as a heterosexual, was "making a picture about homosexuality from the outside." Nevertheless, she found many of the slapstick scenes "splendiferously funny."

Charles Champlin of the Los Angeles Times wrote that the film made the transition from the stage "surprisingly well, given the odds," with "two of the most flamboyantly entertaining and skillful comedy performances of the year" by Jack Weston and Rita Moreno. Gary Arnold of The Washington Post wrote, "I missed the play, but there is certainly something amiss with the film, and it appears to be Richard Lester's direction, which fails to establish a rhythm perky enough to transform a farcical plot and set of conventions pleasurably from one medium to another."

== Home media ==
The Ritz was released to DVD by Warner Home Video on 8 January 2008.

== See also ==
- Continental Baths
