= Chuck Holmes (entrepreneur) =

American adult film producer, businessman and philanthropist

Charles M. "Chuck" Holmes (May 5, 1945 – September 9, 2000) was an American adult film producer, businessman and philanthropist. He founded Falcon Studios in 1971.

== Life and career ==
Holmes was born in Terre Haute, Indiana. He earned a degree in Business Administration from Indiana State University. After working in sales for a construction firm that took him to San Francisco, California, he began Falcon Studios, a gay pornography production and distribution business. He had named it Falcon after the bird of prey. At Falcon "there is generally someone who is the predator and someone who's the prey, but not in a harmful way", he explained. The business was largely mail-order and he was among the first to make the media switch from film to videocassette.

Holmes later directed his fortune toward philanthropy, funding HIV/AIDS outreach programs, as well as San Francisco Community Center Project, Amnesty International, Global Green, Sierra Club, The Gay and Lesbian Victory Fund and the Human Rights Campaign. He was also active in supporting political campaigns both locally in San Francisco and at the national level for the Democratic Party and met with former Soviet leader Mikhail Gorbachev.

Holmes died from liver failure, a complication of AIDS. The Charles M. Holmes building at the San Francisco LGBT Community Center is named in his honor.

Seed Money: The Chuck Holmes Story, a documentary on Holmes and his complicated relationship with the gay rights movement, was released in 2015.
