= TheSword.com =

Gay news and lifestyle website

TheSword.com is a gay news and lifestyle website for coverage of the gay adult industry. Based in San Francisco, a large portion of The Sword's coverage is dedicated to covering the lives of gay porn stars in a tabloid fashion. The Sword is owned by gay adult site NakedSword.com.

The site has campaigned for causes including the decriminalization of prostitution and the rights of transgender people. In 2009, The Sword gained national recognition from the Huffington Post and the San Francisco Chronicle after it reported on the state of California's decision not to train employees of adult websites.

In 2010, The Sword received media attention after then-editor Zachary Sire reported that gay porn star Brandon Wilde had been hired as an escort by Minnesota State Senator Paul Koering.

The Sword currently provides gay news to sites including GayToday.com, JustUsBoys.com, and AVN Online Magazine.

In February 2009, The Sword won Best Erotic E-Zine at the 2009 Cybersocket Awards in West Hollywood.
