= Binakayan =

Geographic region of Cavite, Philippines

- Geographic Region; Populated District
- Interactive map of Binakayan
- Coordinates: 14°27′04″N 120°55′23″E
- Location: Kawit, Cavite, Philippines

Binakayan, or Binacayan, is a geographic region of the Philippines located between the Imus River on the north and east, Bacoor Bay on the west and the Imus on the south in the Province of Cavite. Because it includes the mouth of the Imus River, it is a significant waterbird site and watershed. It is a populated district located within the northeast corner of the present-day town of Kawit and includes the barangays Balsahan-Bisita, Binakayan-Aplaya, Binakayan-Kanluran, Congbalay-Legaspi, Manggahan-Lawin, Pulvorista, Samala-Marquez and Tramo-Bantayan.

== See also ==
- Battle of Binakayan–Dalahican
- St. Michael the Archangel Parish of Binakayan
