= Baldomero Aguinaldo Shrine =

Historic house in Cavite, Philippines

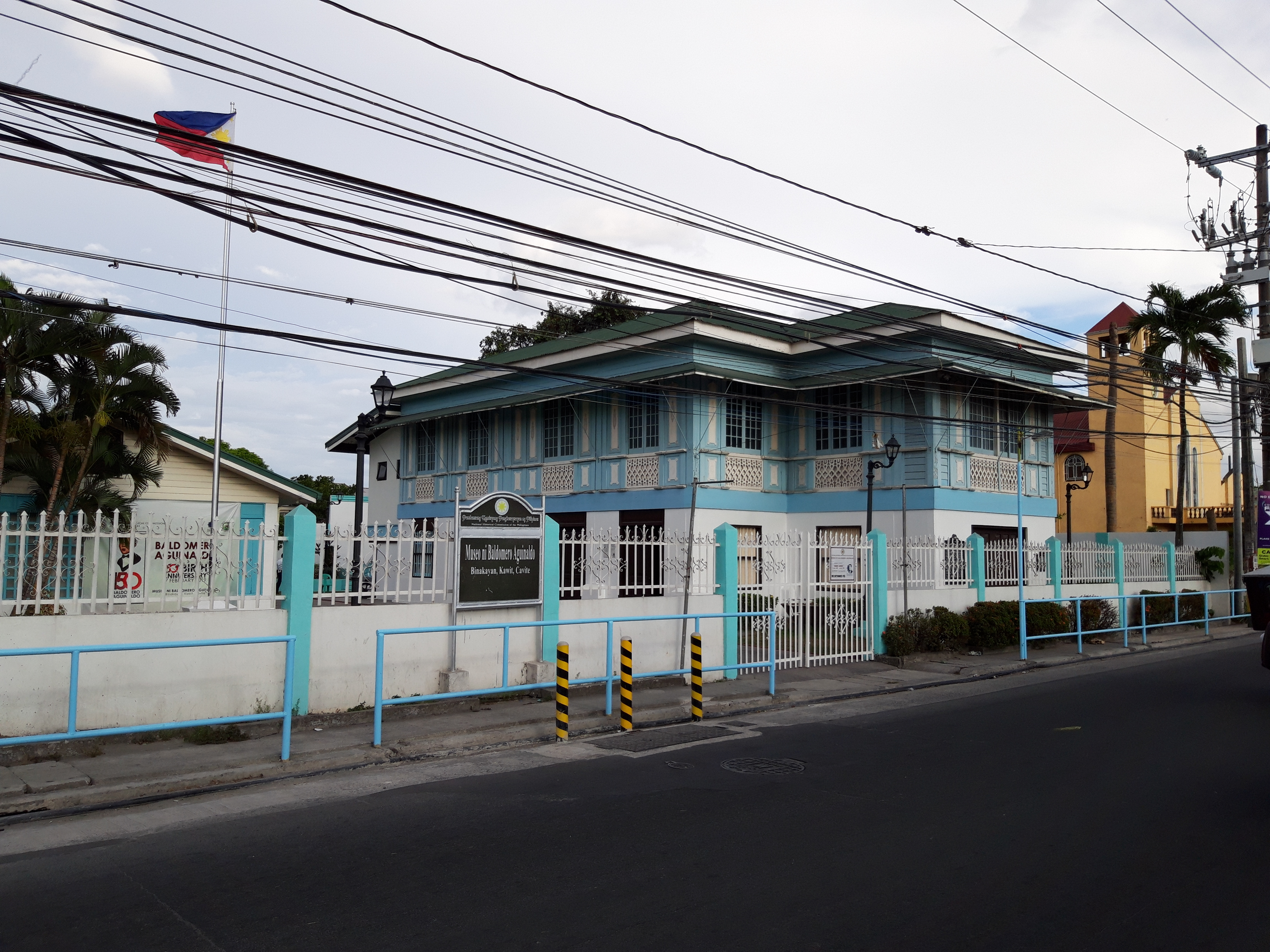
- House of the Magdalo faction leader of the Katipunan and cousin of Emilio Aguinaldo
- Interactive map of the Baldomero Aguinaldo Shrine area
- Alternative names: Baldomero Aguinaldo House

General information
- Status: National Shrine
- Type: Single-detached
- Architectural style: Bahay na Bato
- Location: Kawit, Cavite, Philippines
- Coordinates: 14°26′52″N 120°55′25″E
- Current tenants: National Historical Commission of the Philippines
- Construction started: 1906
- Owner: Government of the Philippines

Technical details
- Material: Stones and Wood
- Floor count: Two

The Baldomero Aguinaldo Shrine is a single-detached house built by Baldomero Aguinaldo, cousin of Emilio Aguinaldo during the American colonial period in 1906 at Binakayan, Kawit, Cavite. Baldomero held several positions at the revolutionary government during the early 1900s. He became the head of the Kawit Chapter of the Katipunan, President of the KKK Magdalo Council, and Secretary of the Treasury in the 1897 Biak-na-Bato Republic. Also, he became the Secretary of War and Public Works after the establishment of the First Philippine Republic by Emilio Aguinaldo.

== Architectural features ==
The house of Gen. Baldomero Aguinaldo is a two-storey house with blue-green and white paint finish and simple decorative details. The lower ground floor or bodega which is intended to be partly closed serves as the working area. Stairs leads up to the living room, orsala, facing in front of the street. It is a well-ventilated space due to provision of three windows at each side. There are two sets of windows: the outer set made out of large glass panes while the inner set composed of fixed wooden blinds made out of Philippine hardwoods, molave and narra. Also, these windows have openings below its window sills, also called ventanillas. Located between floor and the window sill, these openings provide additional inlet and outlet of air inside the second floor.

Aside from the living room, the second floor consists of two bedrooms, kitchen, and dining area, or comedor. A passageway, leading towards the bedrooms, or the zaguan, contains some of the memorabilia from Gen. Baldomero Aguinaldo, books of the municipal library, a history exhibit, and an arrangement of early to mid-20th century household items such as an upright piano. The bedrooms have iron bedsteads from the 1930s. The dining area, or comedor, could accommodate ten guests. It features pieces of furniture such as bentwood Thonet "Vienna" chairs, a dish rack, or vajillera, for china and glass wares, and a stuffed deer head on the wall. Built outside the comedor is a long outside shelf, or banguerra used for drying table ware. The flooring of the kitchen is made out of bamboo slats which is useful for both ventilation and easy cleaning. The bathroom and toilet are off a porch at the rear side of the house.

== Present condition ==
The grandchildren of Gen. Baldomero Aguinaldo, headed by then Prime Minister and Minister of Finance Cesar E.A. Virata, donated the home to the government in 1982. It was restored by the Intramuros Administration into a museum. The project was under the administration of Action Officer Jaime C. Laya, with supervision provided by Dominador Torres.

=== Marker from the National Historical Commission of the Philippines ===
Hen. Baldomero Aguinaldo y Baloy (1869-1915)
ISINILANG NOONG 28 PEBRERO 1869 SA BINAKAYAN, KAWIT, CAVITE, ANAK NI CIPRIANO AGUINALDO AT SILVESTRA BALOY. NAG-ARAL SA ATENEO MUNICIPAL AT PAMANTASAN NG STO. TOMAS. DIRECTORCILLO, REGISTRADOR DE TITULOS AT HUKOM PAMAYAPA NG KAWIT; PANGULO, SANGUNNIANG MAGDALO NG KKK, OKTUBRE 1896; KALIHIM NG PANANALAPI, 1897; ISA SA MGA LUMAGDA SA KONSTITUSYON NG BIYAK-NA-BATO; 1897; KALIHIM PANDIGMA AT GAWAING BAYAN NG UNANG REPUBLIKA NG PILIPINAS, 1898–1899; NAMUMUNONG HENERAL SA TIMOG LUZON NOONG DIGMAANG PILIPINO AT AMERIKANO, 1899; AT TAGAPAGTATAG AT UNANG PANGULO, KAPISANAN NG MGA BETERANO NG HIMAGSIKANG PILIPINO MULA NOONG OKTUBRE 1912 HANGGANG SA KANYANG KAMATAYAN NOONG PEBRERO 1915. ANG MAYBAHAY NIYA AY SI PETRONA REYES NG IMUS, CAVITE AT NAGKAANAK SILA NG DALAWA, SI LEONOR NA NAGING ASAWA NI DR. ENRIQUE T. VIRATA AT SI AURELLANO KAY LIWANAG VIRATA, PINSANG-BUO NI HEN. EMILIO AGUINALDO.

Ang Bahay ni Heneral Baldomero Aguinaldo
SA BAHAY NA ITO NA IPINATAYO NOONG 1906 NANIRAHAN SI HENERAL BALDOMERO AGUINALDO AT ANG KANYANG MAG-ANAK. UNANG IPINATAYO NA YARI SA NARRA AT MOLAVE, ANG BAHAY AY PINANUMBALIK NG INTRAMUROS ADMINISTRATION. NOONG 1982 ITO AY IPINAGKALOOB NG PUNONG MINISTRO CESAR E.A. VIRATA SA PAMAHALAAN NG PILIPINAS.
