= St. Mary Magdalene Church (Kawit) =

Roman Catholic church in Cavite, Philippines

Kawit Church
- Diocesan Shrine and Parish of the Saint Mary Magdalene
- Saint Mary Magdalene Parish
- Santuario Diocesano y Iglesia Parroquial de Santa Maria Magdalena (Spanish)
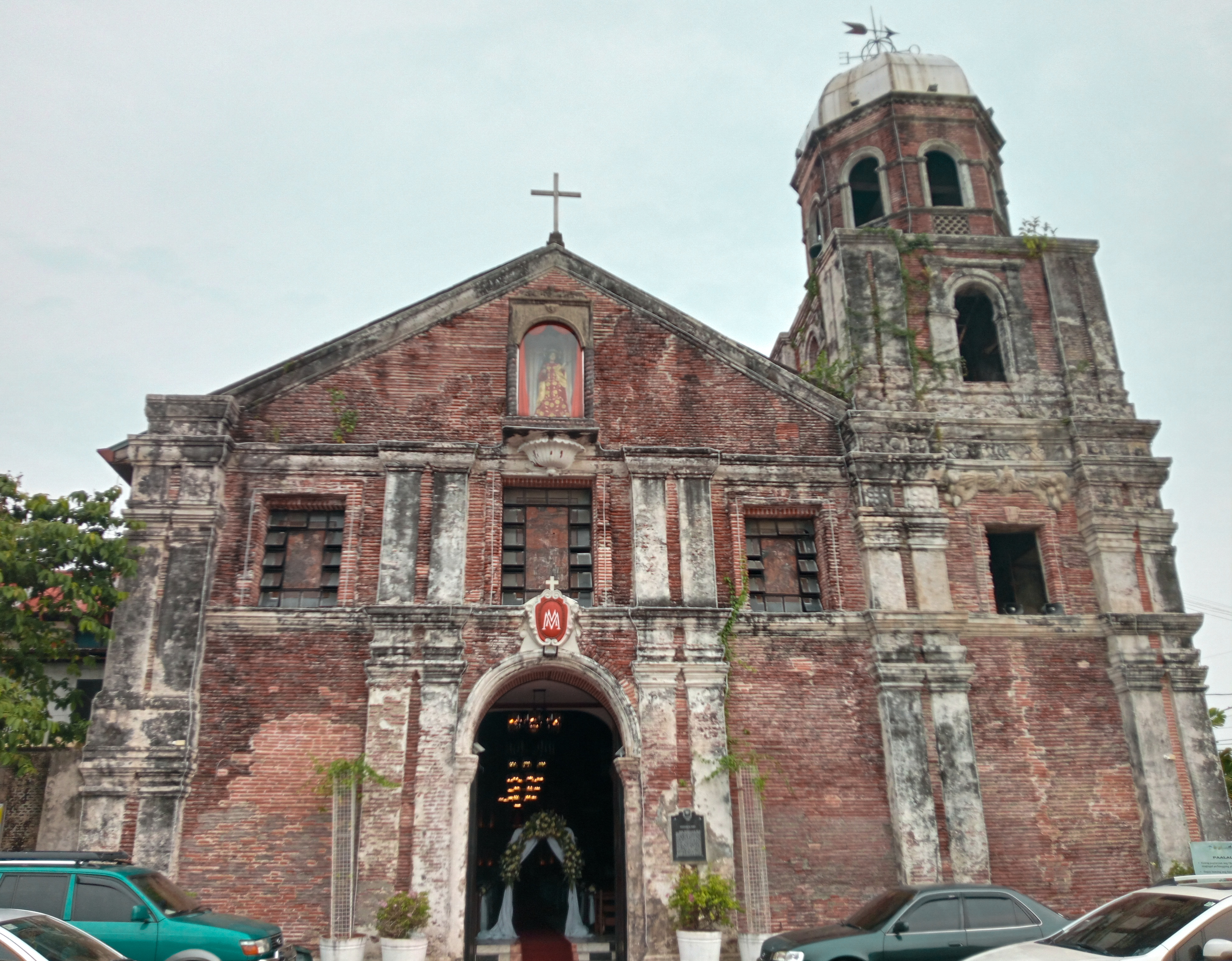
- Church facade in 2023

- Location in Luzon Location in the Philippines
- 14°26′41″N 120°54′13″E
- Location: Kawit, Cavite, Philippines
- Denomination: Roman Catholic
- Churchmanship: Latin Rite

History
- Status: Diocesan shrine

Architecture
- Functional status: Active
- Heritage designation: Marked Historical Structure of the Philippines (1990)
- Architectural type: Church building
- Style: Earthquake Baroque
- Groundbreaking: 1624

Specifications
- Length: 240 feet (73 m)
- Width: 92 feet (28 m)
- Materials: Bricks, Egg whites, Sea shells, stone and wood

Administration
- Archdiocese: Manila
- Diocese: Imus

Clergy
- Priest(s): Rev. Fr. Efren M. Bugayong JCD, JD

The Diocesan Shrine and Parish of Saint Mary Magdalene, commonly known as Kawit Church, is a Roman Catholic church in Kawit, Cavite in the Philippines. It is the parish church of the municipality of Kawit, and is under the jurisdiction of the Diocese of Imus. The church is one of the oldest in the Philippines, having been built in 1737. It is dedicated after Jesus' disciple Mary Magdalene.

== History ==
The Jesuits first came to Kawit in 1624 to spread Christianity. The first church in the area was constructed in 1638 using wooden materials through the help of six native families from Maragondon and Silang. Kawit, which was formerly known as Cavite el Viejo during Spanish occupation, was frequented by Spanish marines, which led to the town gaining the reputation of being a "red-light district". In response, the Archbishop of Manila, Miguel Garcia Serrano ordered the dedication of the church to St. Mary Magdalene, who became the patroness of the town.

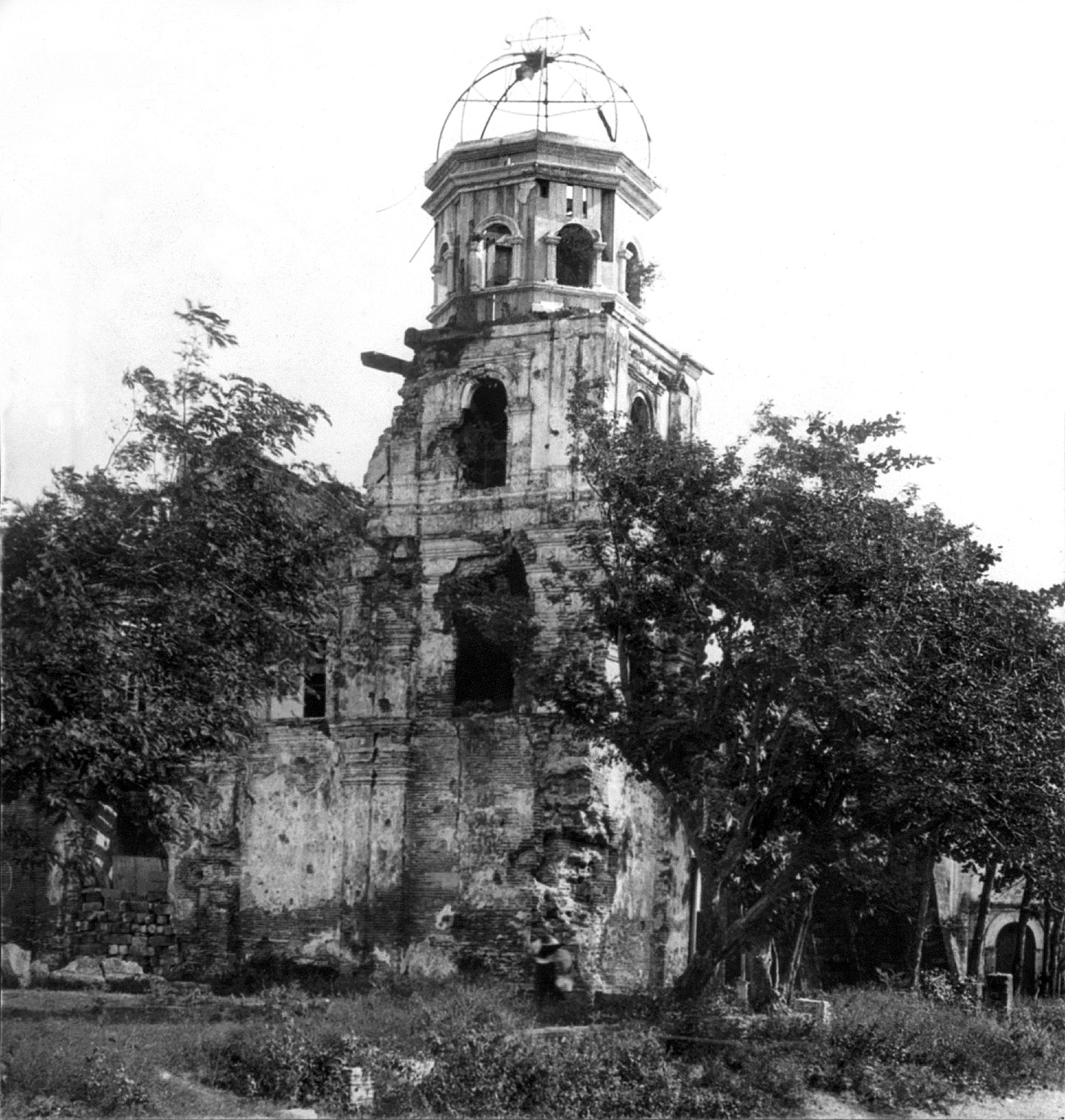
Saint Mary Magdalene Church after it was bombed by the Americans during the Philippine–American War 1898.

In 1737, the construction of the present stone church began. The church was transferred to the secular clergy in 1768 after the expulsion of the Jesuits from all Spanish colonies. Its roof was destroyed by a typhoon in 1831. In 1849, the church was transferred to the Recollects. In 1869, Emilio Aguinaldo, the future president of the First Philippine Republic was baptized in the church. His birth certificate is kept inside a glass cabinet and on the left side of the altar.

The church sustained damage during the Philippine Revolution in 1898, when it was shelled by Philippine forces using a pair of eight-inch muzzle loading cannon belonging to the San Roque Battery under the command of an American, L.M. Johnson (who was mentioned in the Philippine Declaration of Independence) on the orders of Aguinaldo, leading to the surrender of Spanish forces inside. During the Philippine–American War it was again bombarded by the Americans to flush out Filipino leaders hiding inside.

== Physical features ==
Over time, the church's façade has gained a characteristic patina, prevalent in the brick walls, making the plastered cornices and pilasters that divide the façade noticeable. The façade is otherwise devoid of any flamboyant decorative elements.

The first level is separated by pilasters into vertical bays. The arched main portal dominates the center of the façade, topped by the seal of Mary Magdalene represented by two capital letter M's. Rectangular windows line the second level. The pediment features a central niche which enshrines a statue of Mary Magdalene.

A four-story bell tower is on the right side of the façade and its lower levels are square. The topmost level is narrower and octagonal. The bell tower's top windows have arched windows marked by ventanillas with latticework below the window sills. The belfry is capped by a metal dome with a weather vane on top.

The church was drawn in a cruciform plan with a single nave. The sides of the church have 14 sets of windows each with a small stained-glass depicting the 14 Stations of the Cross. Below each window are arch-shaped windows allowing air to circulate. The two sides of the main altar each have larger stained-glass windows - one depicts the Resurrection of Christ and the other the life of Jesus Christ.

Architectural features of the church exterior

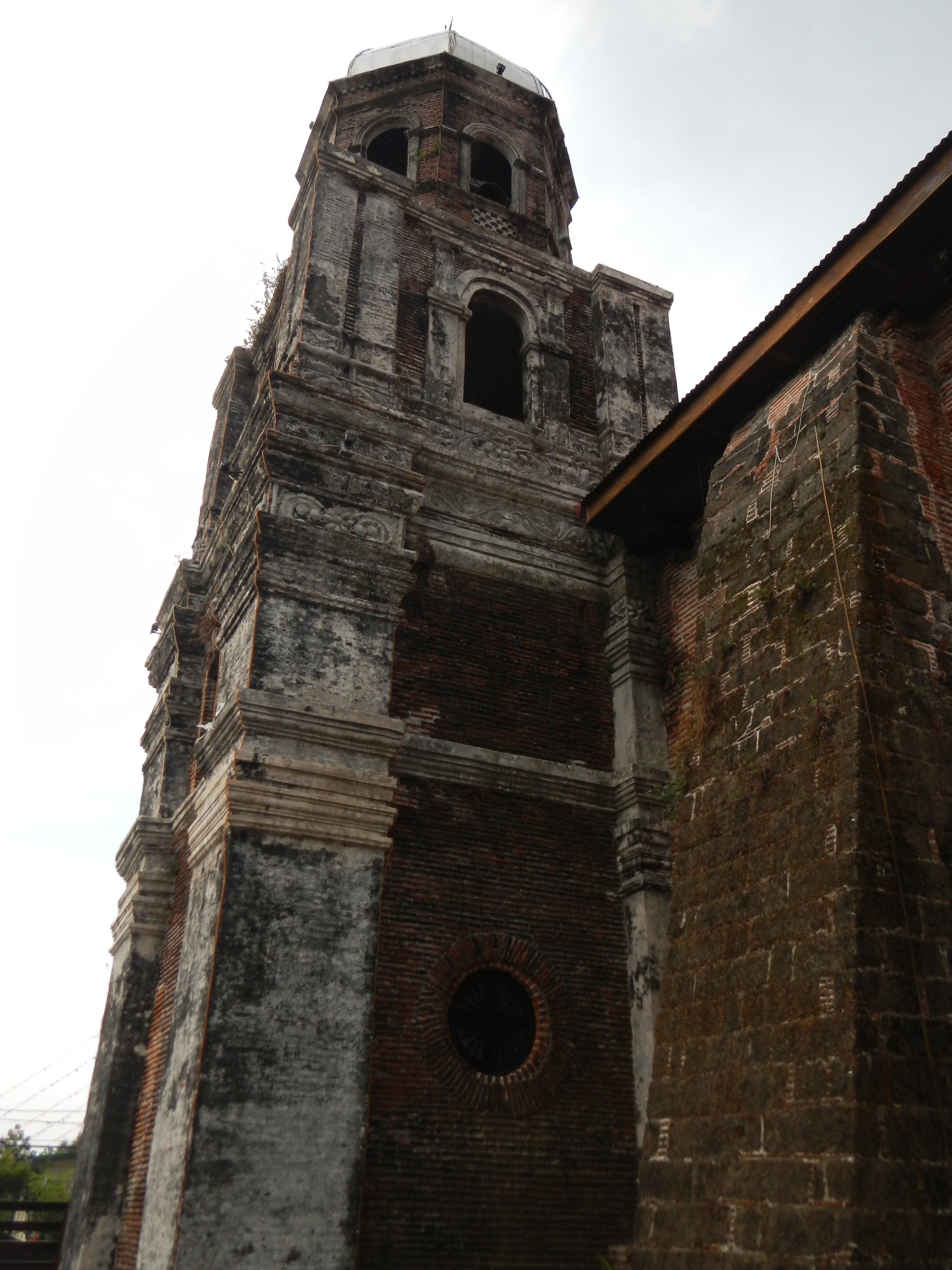
The bell tower of Saint Mary Magdalene Church

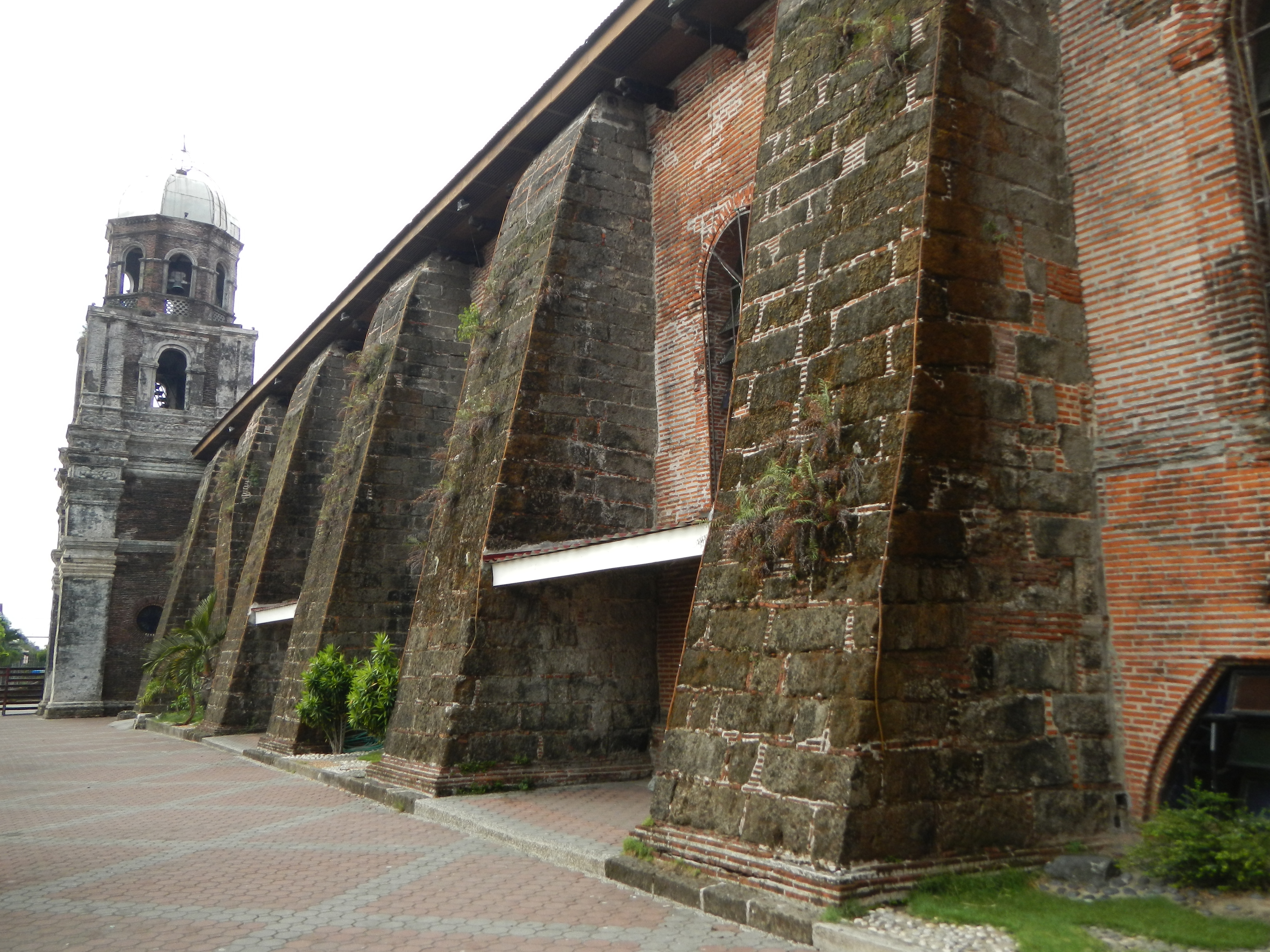
The thick buttresses of the church typical of Earthquake Baroque architecture

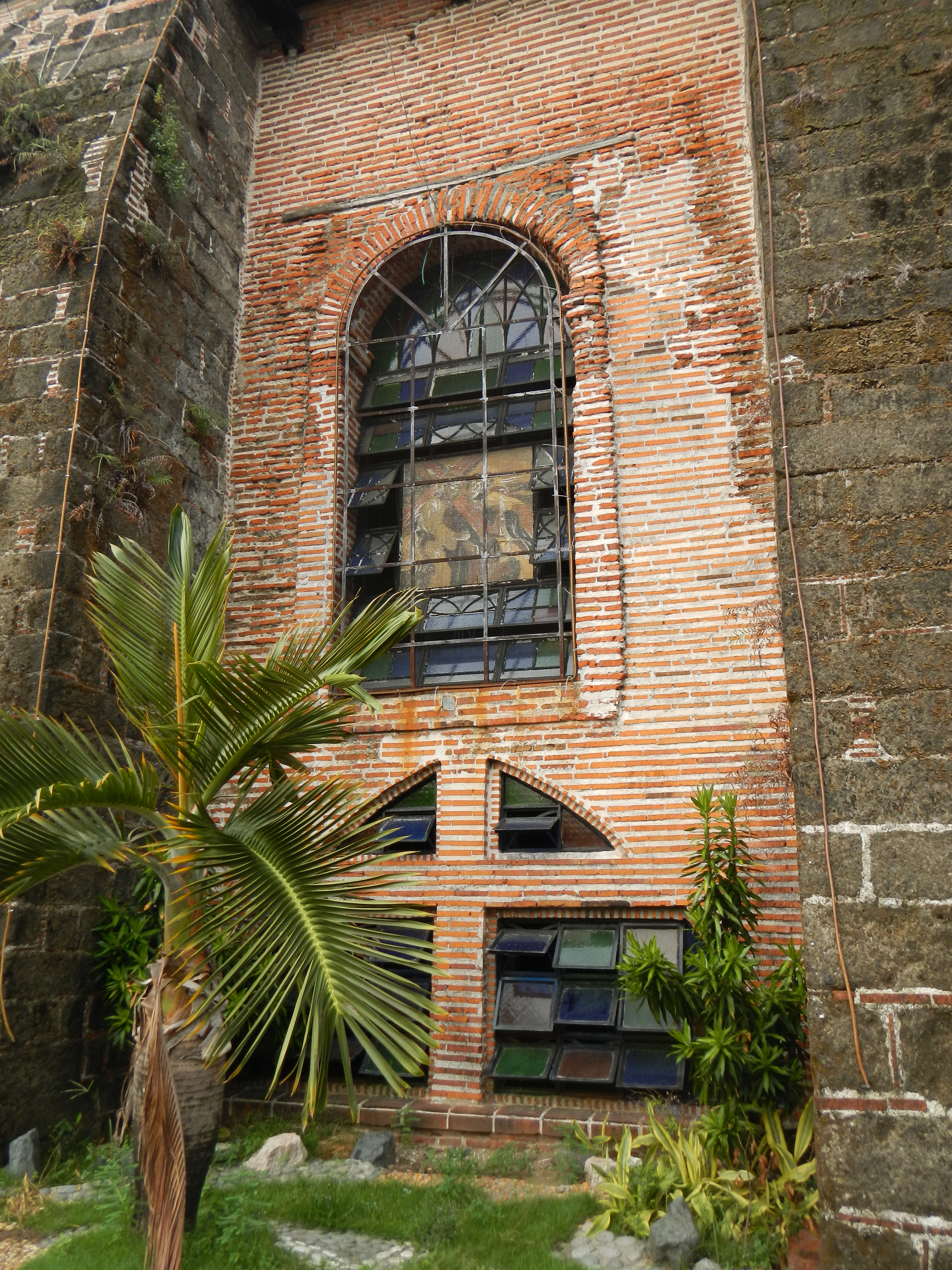
The side windows with several openings for ventilation and one of the Stations of the Cross

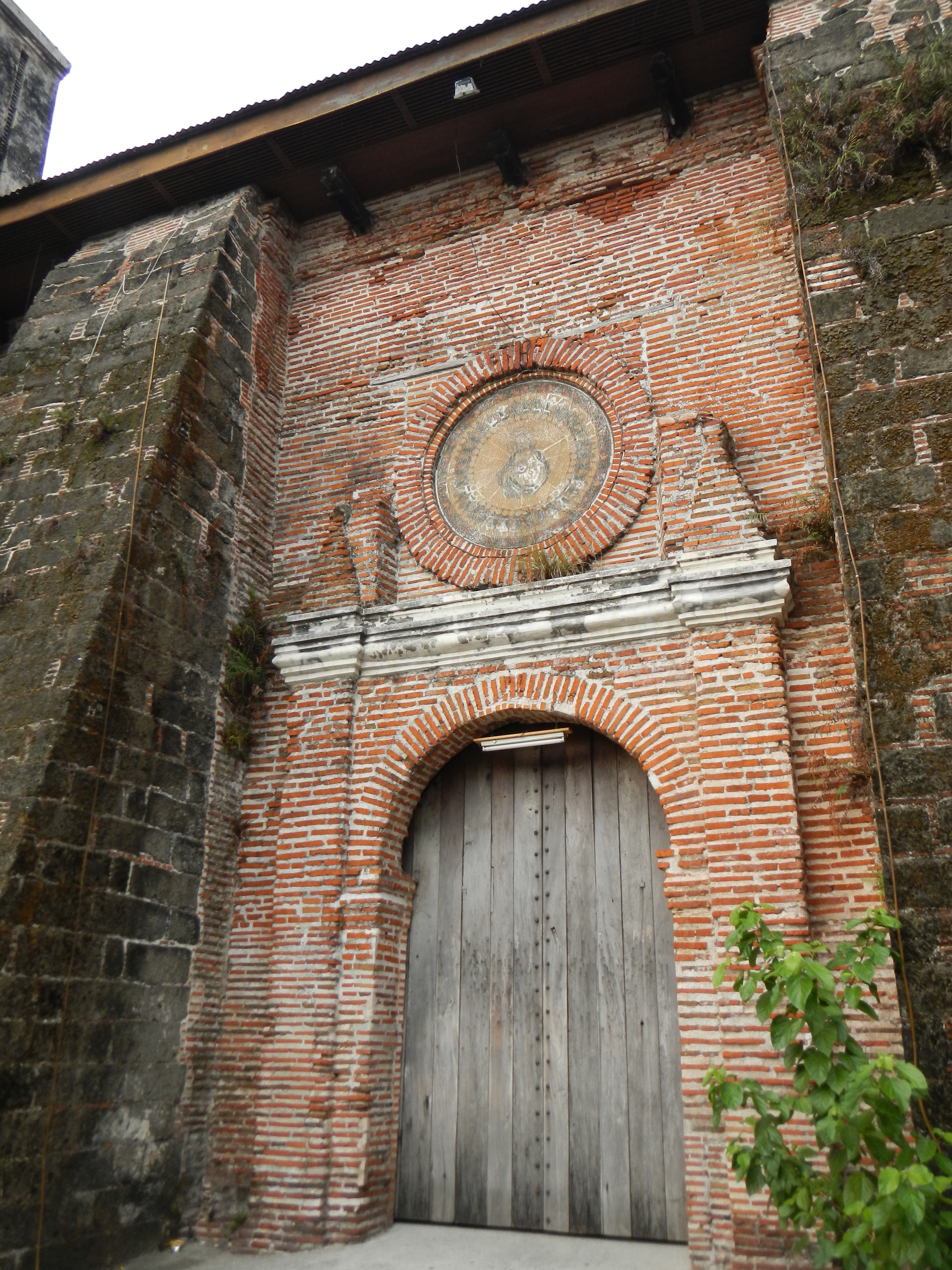
The side door on the western side of the church

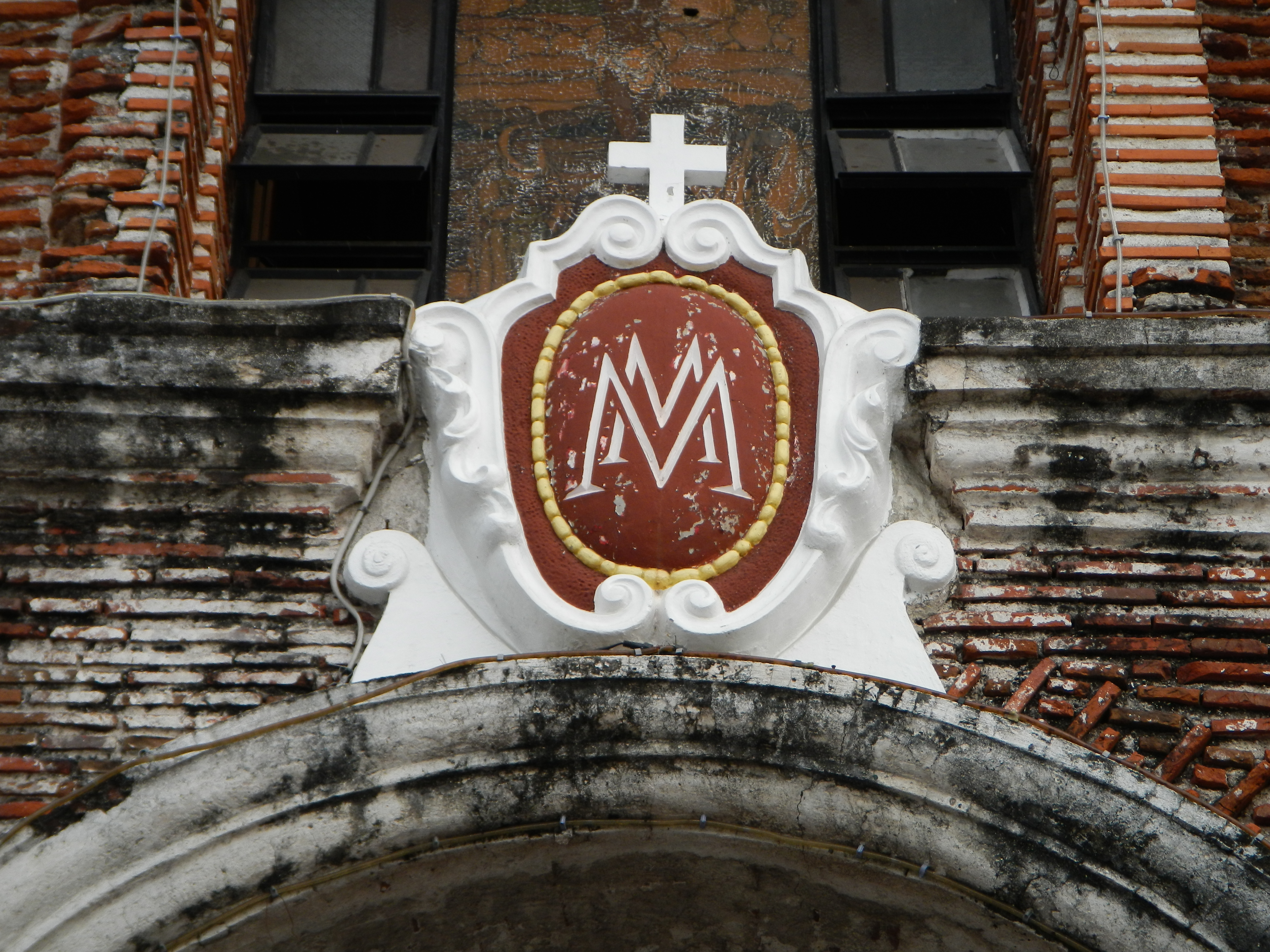
The two "M" signifying Mary Magdalene, the patroness of the church

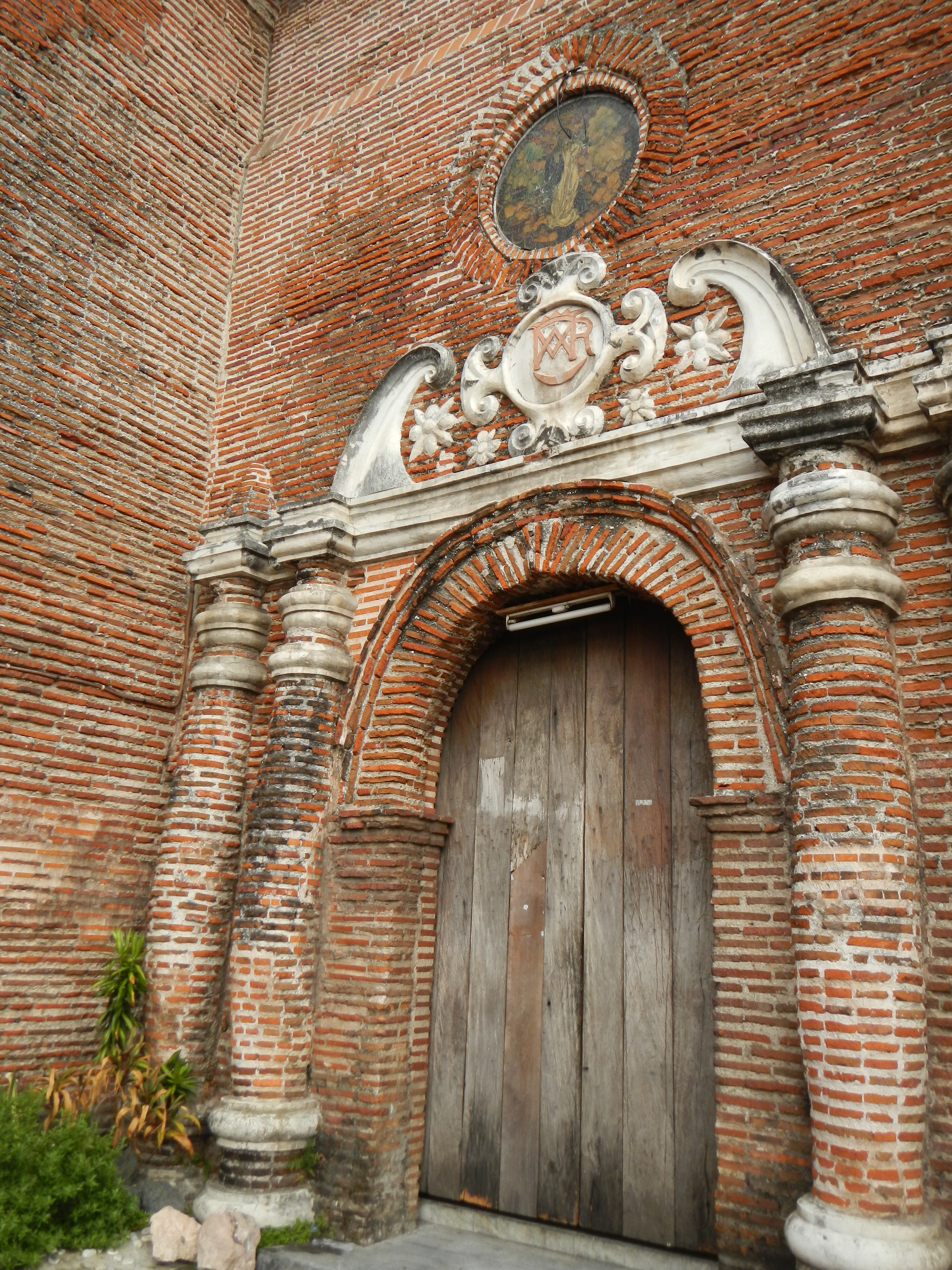
Side door near the back of the church
Interior details of the church

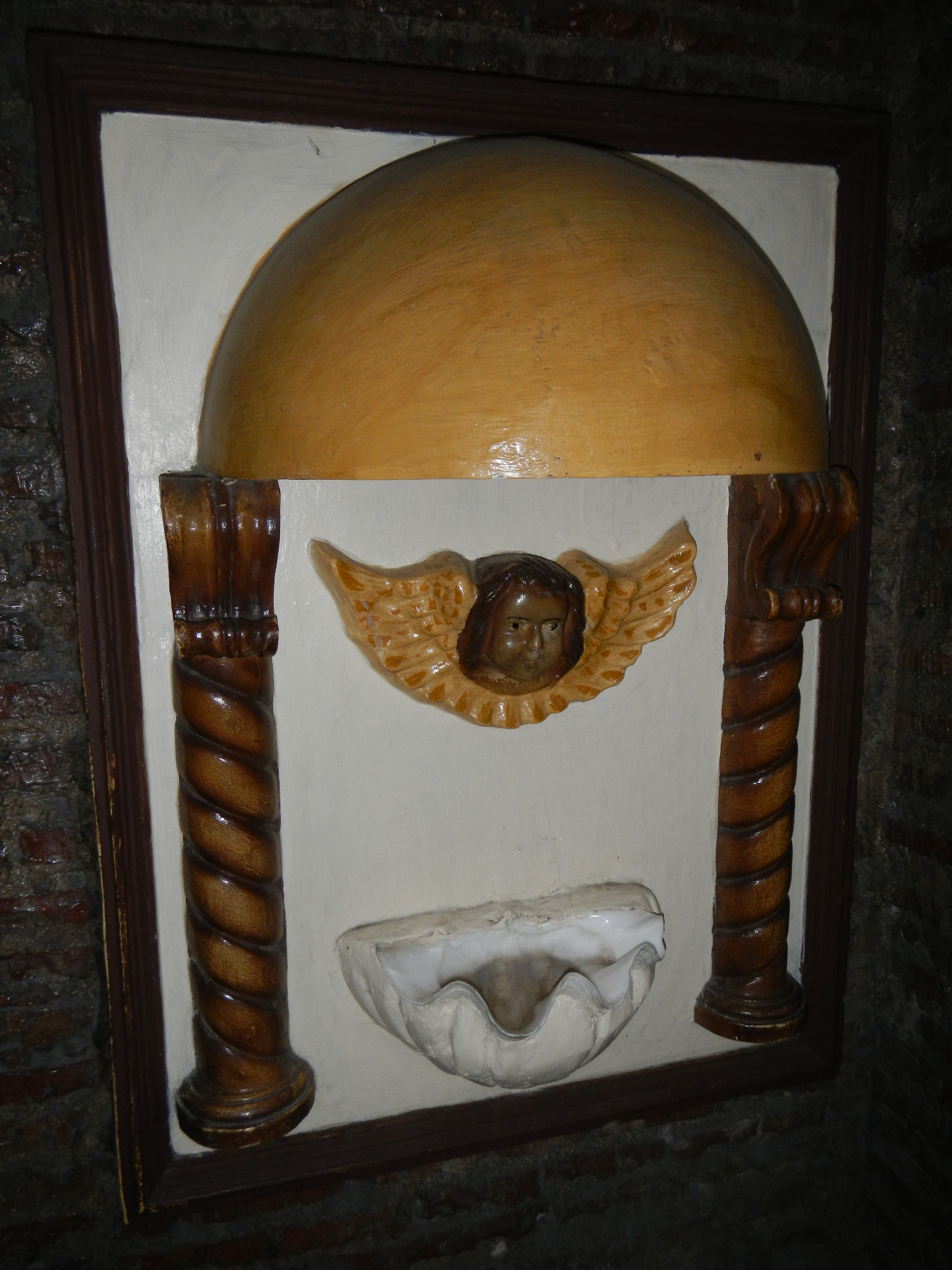
The holy water font by the entrance

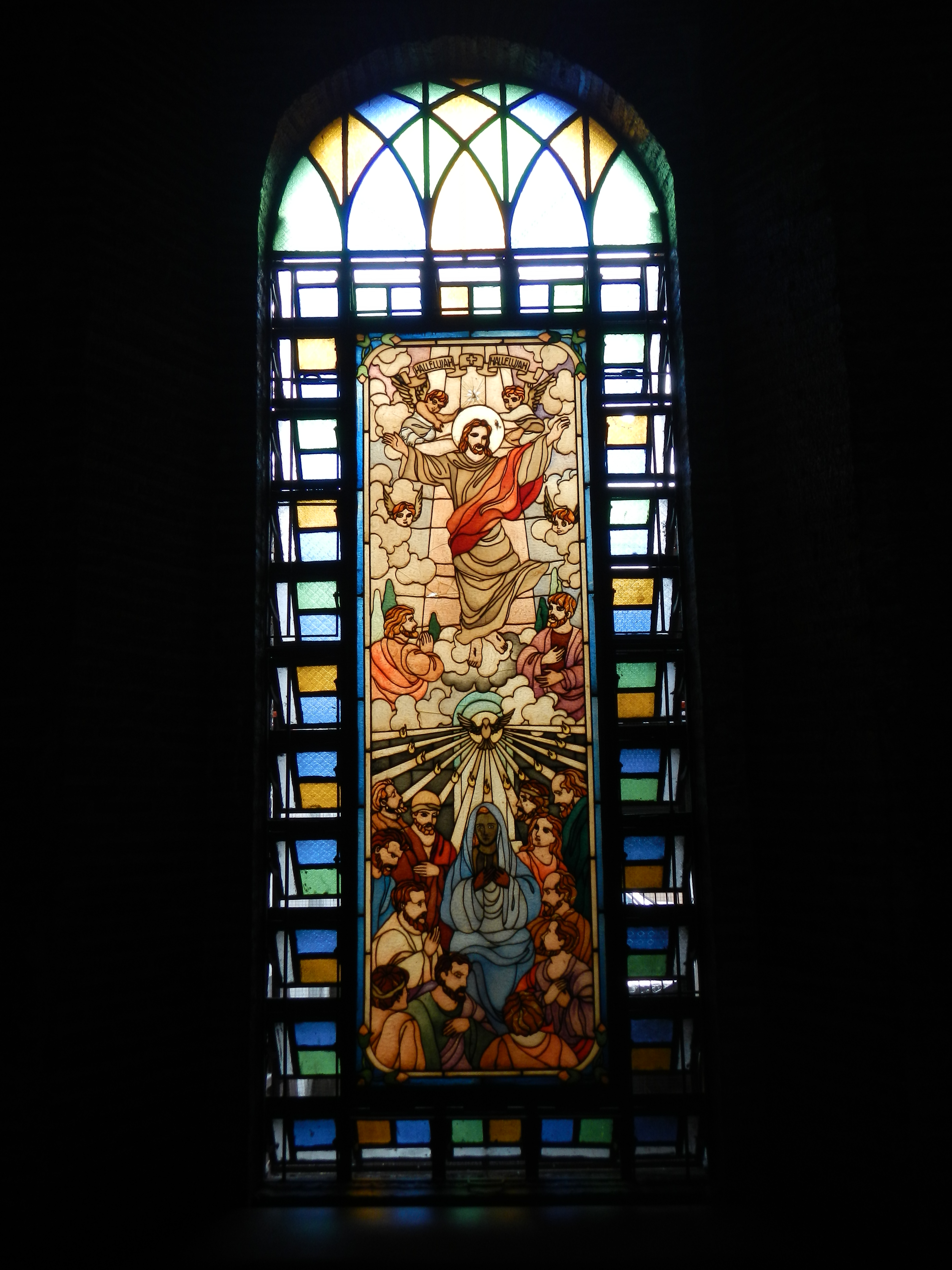
The large stained-glass window by the main altar depicting the Resurrection of Christ

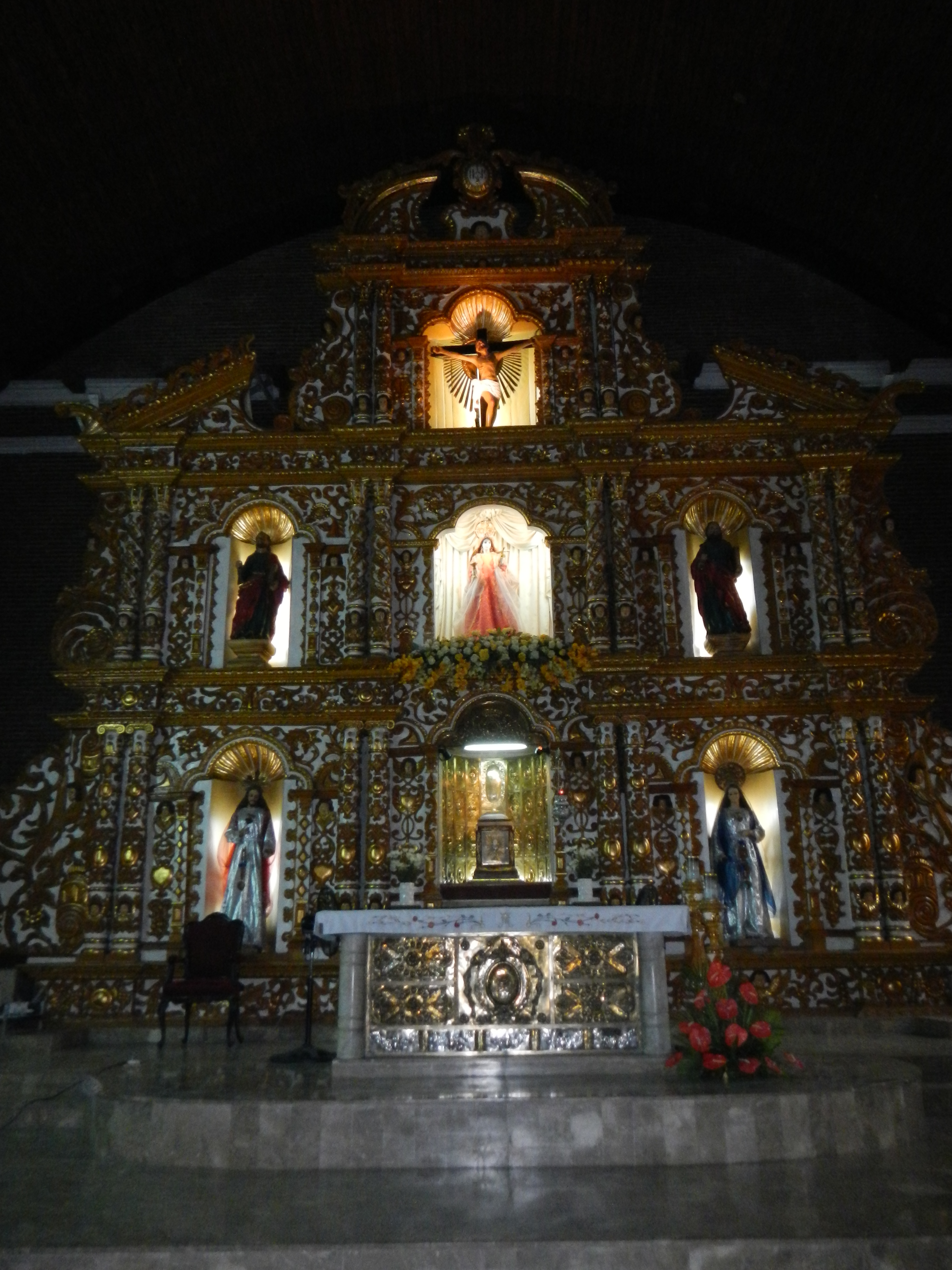
The high altar and main retablo of Saint Mary Magdalene Church

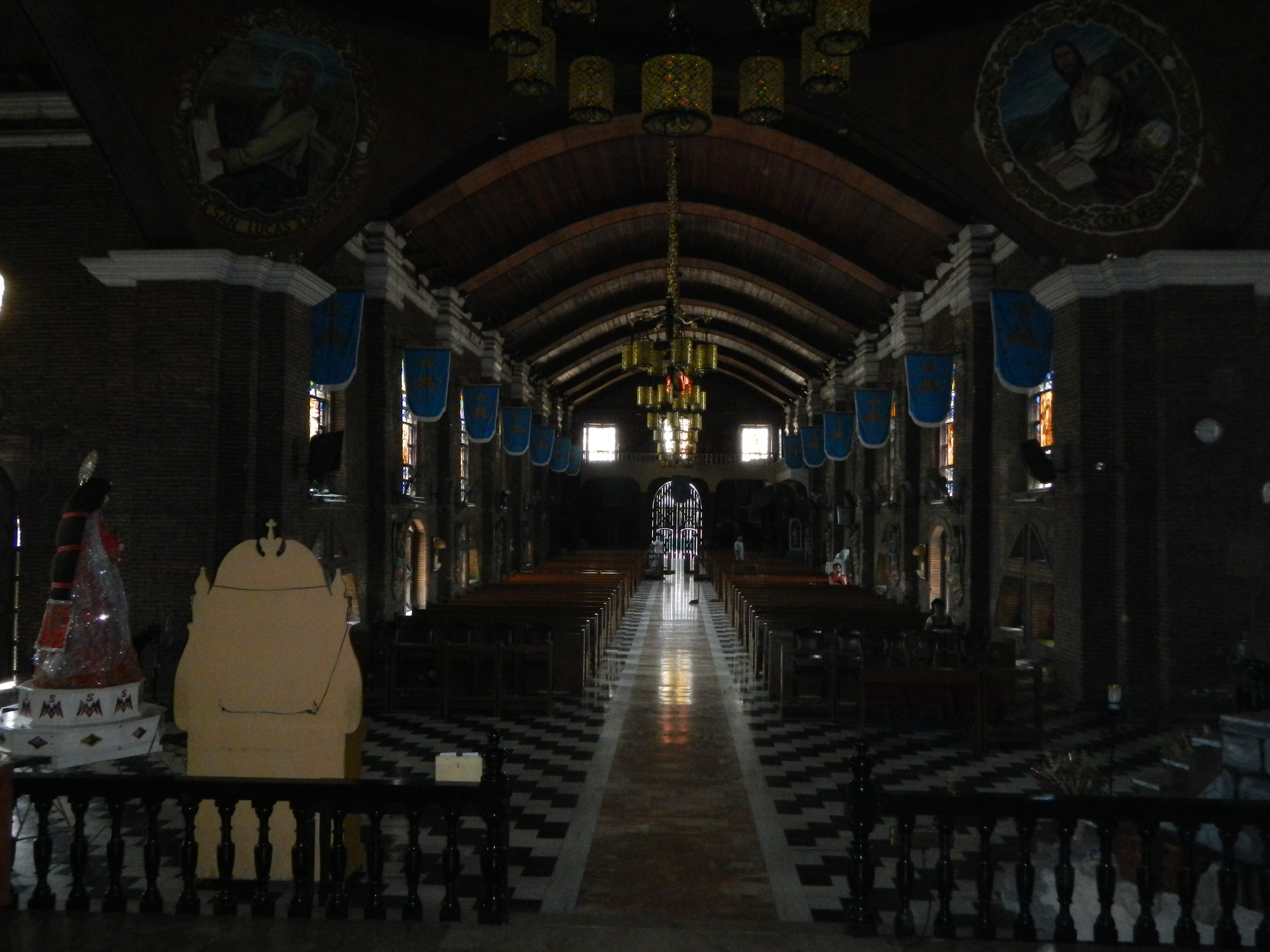
The communion rails and the nave as seen from the sanctuary

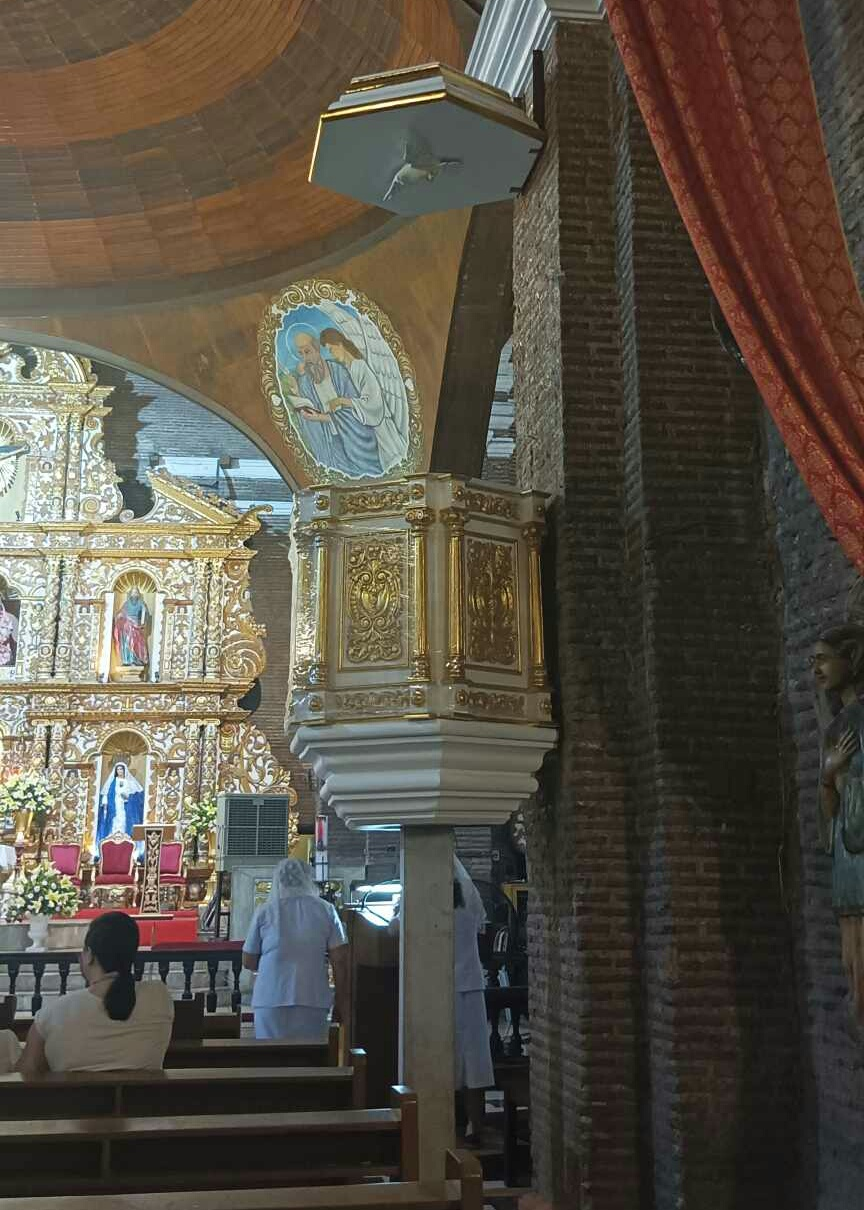
Newly installed church pulpit near in the sanctuary

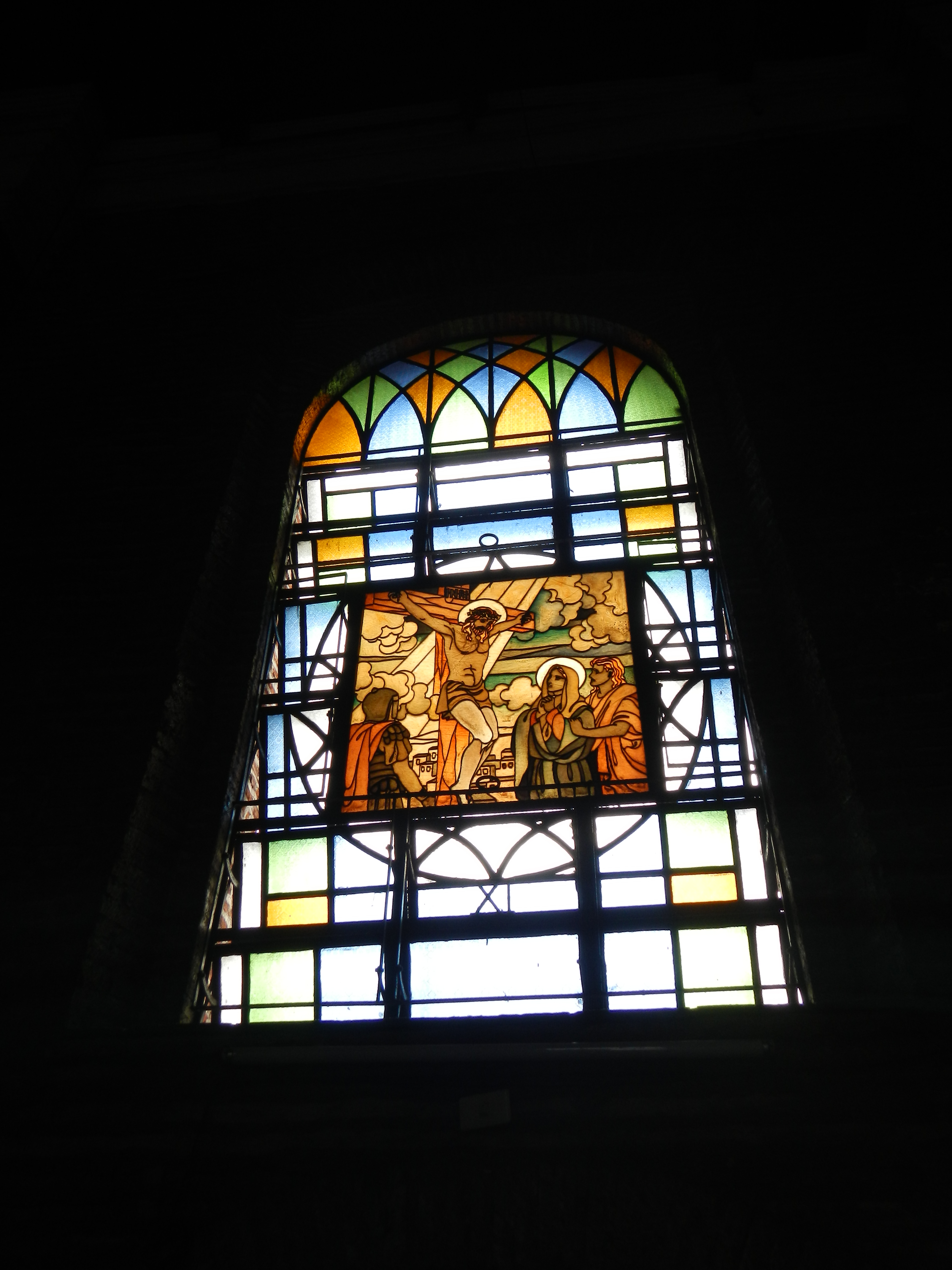
One of the windows and one of the Stations of the Cross

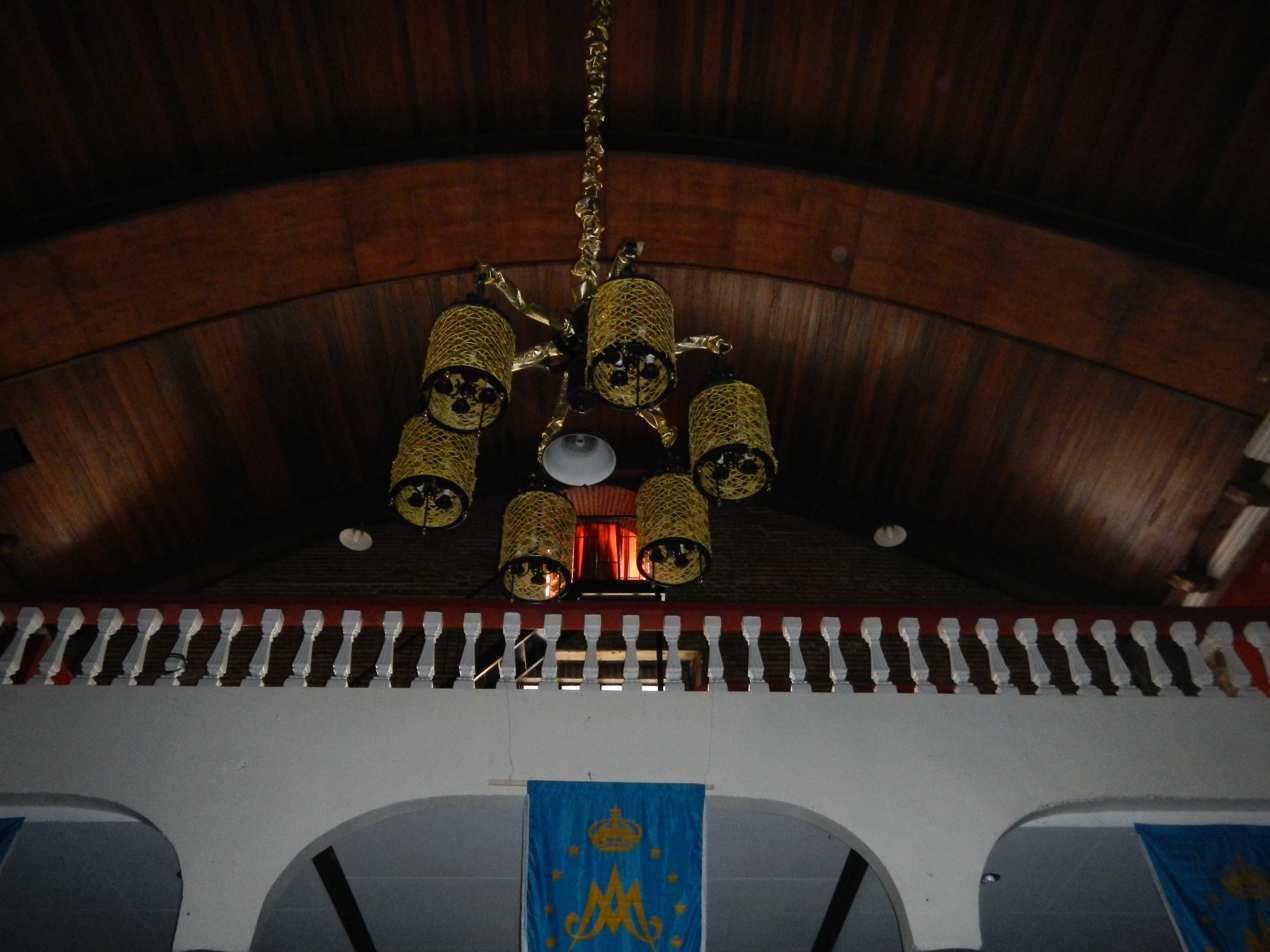
The choir loft with the lacquered wooden ceiling shown

== Saint Mary Magdalene's statue ==
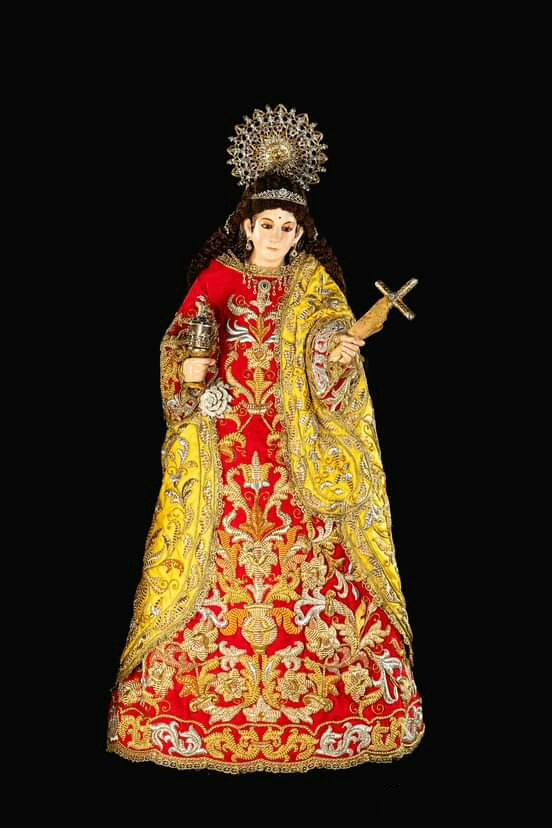
The image of Saint Mary Magdalene with the "mark" in her forehead

The church houses a life-size antique statue of Mary Magdalene which is notable for having a "mark" in the middle of her forehead which resembles a mole. Different theories persist as to the origin of the mark, with hypotheses such as it being a reference Jesus' fingertip during his resurrection when he had appeared to Magdalene and said Noli me tangere (Touch me not) as recorded in the Gospel of John. Others suggest that this mark is to distinguish her from the Virgin Mary.

== Vicariate of Saint Mary Magdalene ==
The Vicariate of Saint Mary Magdalene of the Diocese of Imus was established in 1961. It covers the following parishes:

- Nuestra Señora de la Soledad Parish (Our Lady of Solitude Parish) – Villa Cañacao, Sta. Isabel, Kawit
- Diocesan Shrine and Parish of Our Lady of Fatima – Samala-Marquez, Binakayan, Kawit
- San Antonio de Padua Parish – San Antonio, Cavite City
- San Pedro Apostol Parish – San Pedro, Cavite City
- Diocesan Shrine of Nuestra Señora de la Soledad de Porta Vaga and Parish of San Roque – San Roque, Cavite City (Jubilee Church)
- Diocesan Shrine and Parish of Saint Mary Magdalene – Kawit Proper (Jubilee Church)
- Holy Cross Parish – Poblacion, Noveleta

== Marked historical structure ==
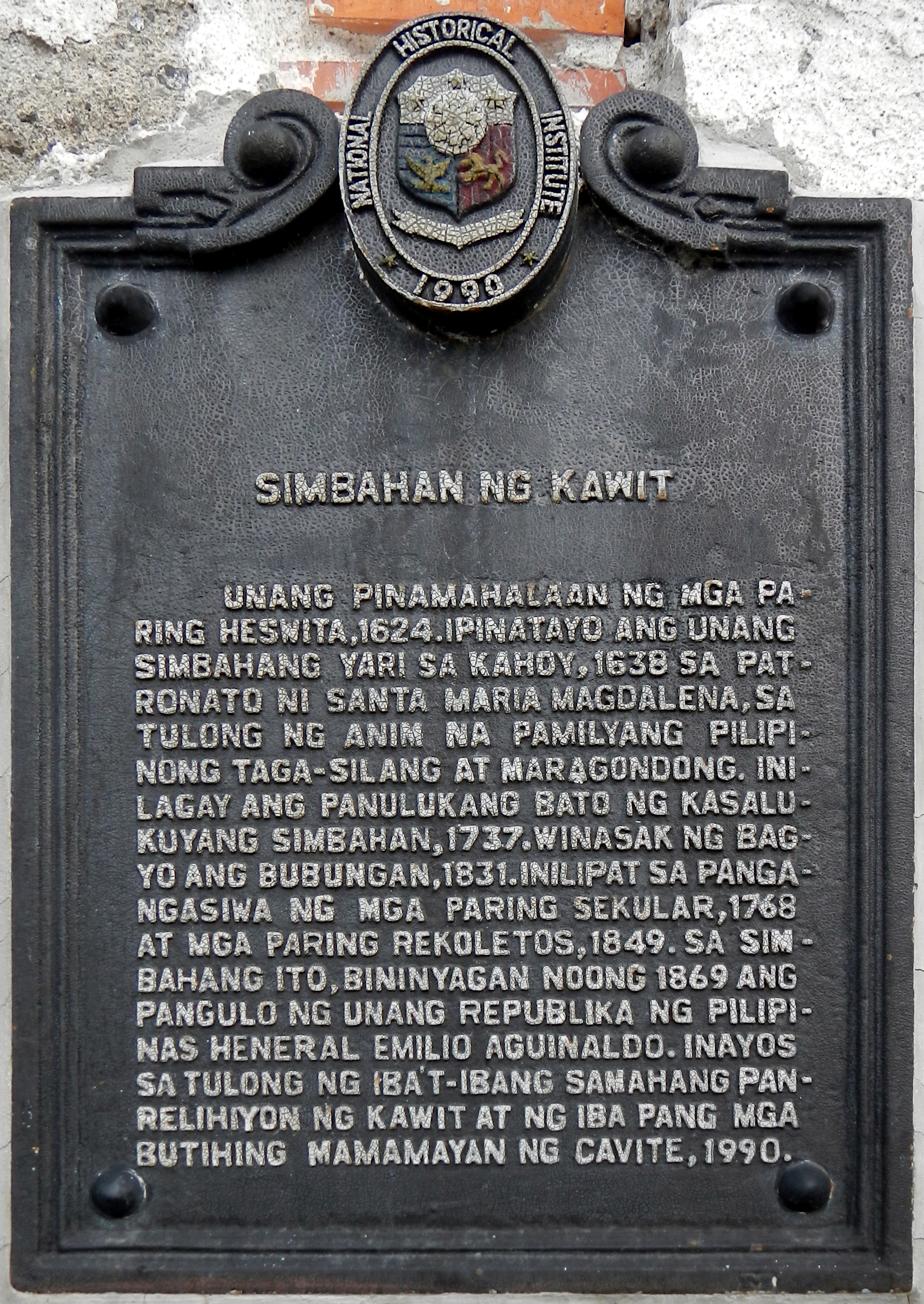
Church NHI historical marker installed in 1990

The Saint Mary Magdalene Church was declared a Historical Structure of the Philippines by the National Historical Institute (now the National Historical Commission of the Philippines in 1990.

== Appearances in media ==
The church was featured in different films and commercials:

- The music video "Tell The World of His Love", produced for the World Youth Day in 1995, was filmed in the interiors of the church with actress Sharon Cuneta.
- The 2002 film I Think I'm in Love starring Joyce Jimenez and Piolo Pascual was filmed at the church.
- The wedding scene of Emilio Aguinaldo and his second wife Maria Agoncillo in the 2012 Aguinaldo biopic, El Presidente, was filmed inside the church.

== See also ==
- List of Cultural Properties of the Philippines in CALABARZON

== Bibliography ==
- Galende, Pedro G. Philippine Church Facades. Quezon City: Filipiniana.net, 2007.
- Layug, Benjamin L. A Tourist Guide to Notable Philippine Churches. Quezon City: New Day Publication, 2007.
