= Kawit shooting =

2013 mass shooting in Kawit, Philippines

- Kawit (Philippines)
- Location: Tabon 1, Kawit, Cavite, Philippines
- Date: January 4, 2013; 9:00 a.m. - 9:30 a.m.
- Attack type: Mass shooting; mass murder
- Weapon: Colt 1911 semi-automatic pistol
- Deaths: 10 (including the perpetrator and an unborn baby)
- Injuries: 12
- Perpetrator: Ronald Baquiran Bae
- Motive: Unknown

The Kawit shooting was a mass murder that occurred in barangay Tabon 1 in Kawit, Philippines, on January 4, 2013. 41-year-old Ronald Baquiran Bae killed at 10 people and a dog, and wounded twelve other people with a semiautomatic pistol, before he was shot and killed by police. Another man, 27-year-old John Paul Lopez, who was said to have been employed by Bae as his house caretaker, was later arrested for assisting the gunman during the shooting by reloading his pistol magazine. The motive of the suspect is unclear, officials said.

== The shooting ==
The shooting began just after 9:00 a.m., when Bae, together with Lopez, went to a neighbor's house and shot at Maricel Pajal, who was doing her laundry. The two then proceeded to the residence of the Caimol family, where he encountered the three Caimol children, among them his godchild Ken Cedric Caimol. He asked the children for the whereabouts of their father, Berto, to which they replied that he was not there. Bae then drew a .45-caliber Colt 1911 and shot the children, killing 7-year-old Michaella, and seriously wounding her 3-year-old brother and 2-year-old sister.

Bae and Lopez then left, and while running through the street, Bae fired at anyone in his path, while Lopez would reload his pistol when he ran out of ammunition. During this moment, he killed a dog and its owner, 55-year-old Alberto Fernandez, who was standing on the porch of his house. He then proceeded to a nearby alley and went inside houses, shooting at every person he encountered, including a pregnant woman named Rhea de Vera, who was shot in the stomach, and her 3-year-old daughter John Monica. He exited the alley and proceeded to the main road of the village still firing at anyone he encountered. He arrived at a small market (talipapa) where he killed tricycle driver Boyet Toledo, fruit vendor Irene Funelas, and taho vendor Al Orio.

Afterwards, Bae returned to his home. Police soon arrived and asked him to surrender. The gunman started shooting at the police until he was eventually killed when officers returned fire. Overall, the shooting had lasted for about 30 minutes. Lopez, on the other hand, disappeared after the shooting, and a reward of ₱100,000was offered for information that would lead to his arrest, though he eventually surrendered himself to police and was taken into custody.

=== Victims ===
- Michaella Andrea Caimol, 7
- Rhea de Vera y Alberto, 34, pregnant
- John Monica de Vera, 3, daughter of Rhea de Vera
- Alberto Fernandez y Jaminal, 55
- Irene Funelas, 40
- Al Orio, 20
- Boyet Toledo, 44

Another person named Adoracion Cabrera was also reported killed by the Cavite provincial government.

Among those wounded were: Baby Anolacion, 33, Emelinda Aquipel y De Vella, 41, Enrique Aquipel, Cheveri Jaminal Ayson, Jemerlen Ayson, 46, Dovie Cabrera y Magsino, 66, Ken Cedric Caimol, 3, Michelle Caimol, 2, Ricky Diola Dumip-ig, 17, Antonio Orio, 15, Maricel Pajal, 27, Raul Ravelo, 73 and Kevin Magarago Vallada, 6.

== Perpetrator ==
Bae was born on November 9, 1971. He married Elena Bae 5 years before the shooting and he had 5 children with her, as well as 2 children from a previous marriage. It is believed that he murdered Teodulo Villanueva in 2003. He had anger problems, such as beating his wife and threatening people. In 2010, he ran in an election to become the chairman of a village, but he lost. In the days leading up to the shooting, Bae and his friends were doing an alcohol and drug binge.

== Aftermath ==
After Lopez had hinted to investigators that Bae had already killed other people in previous years and buried their bodies around his house, police searched the area and unearthed the skeletal remains of a human being. According to Lopez, they belonged to Teodulo Villanueva, a former helper of Bae, whom he murdered in 2003 for duping him in connection with his fighting cocks.

Lopez was charged with 7 counts of murder, 11 accounts of frustrated murder, direct assault, attempted murder and illegal firearms possession. He pled not guilty on February 4, 2013.

== See also ==
- Maguindanao massacre
