= St. Michael the Archangel Parish of Binakayan =

Church in Cavite, Philippines

Coordinates: 14°26′50″N 120°55′25″E

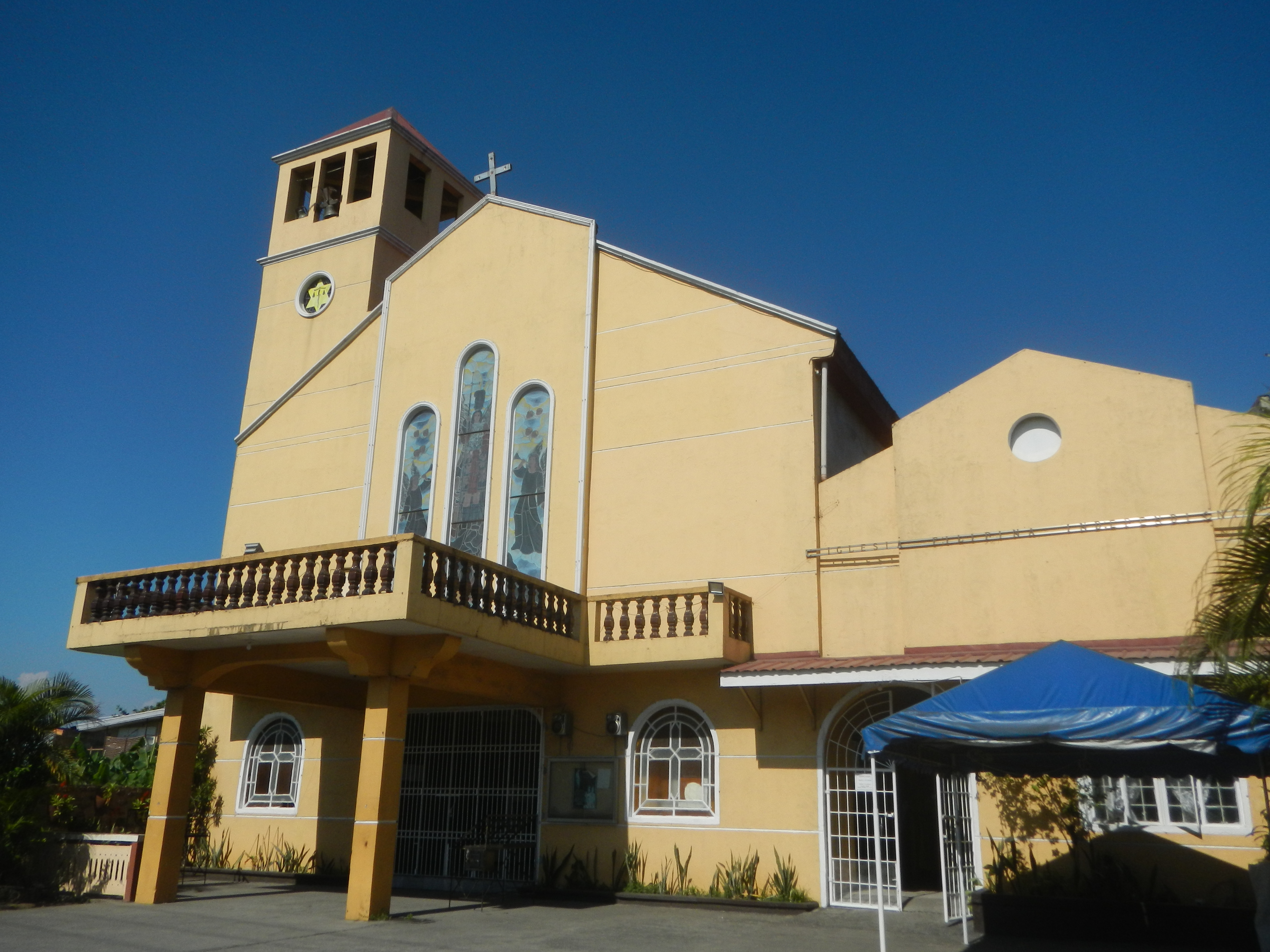
The St. Michael the Archangel Parish Church of Binakayan

The Iglesia Catolica Apostolica Filipina Independiente – also known as Iglesia Filipina Independiente de Binakayan, is a Christian Church organized in Kawit, Cavite, Philippines, in 1902, under the Diocese of Cavite of the Philippine Independent Church.
