= Kawit =

Municipality in Cavite, Philippines

Kawit Cavite el Viejo
- Municipality
- Municipality of Kawit
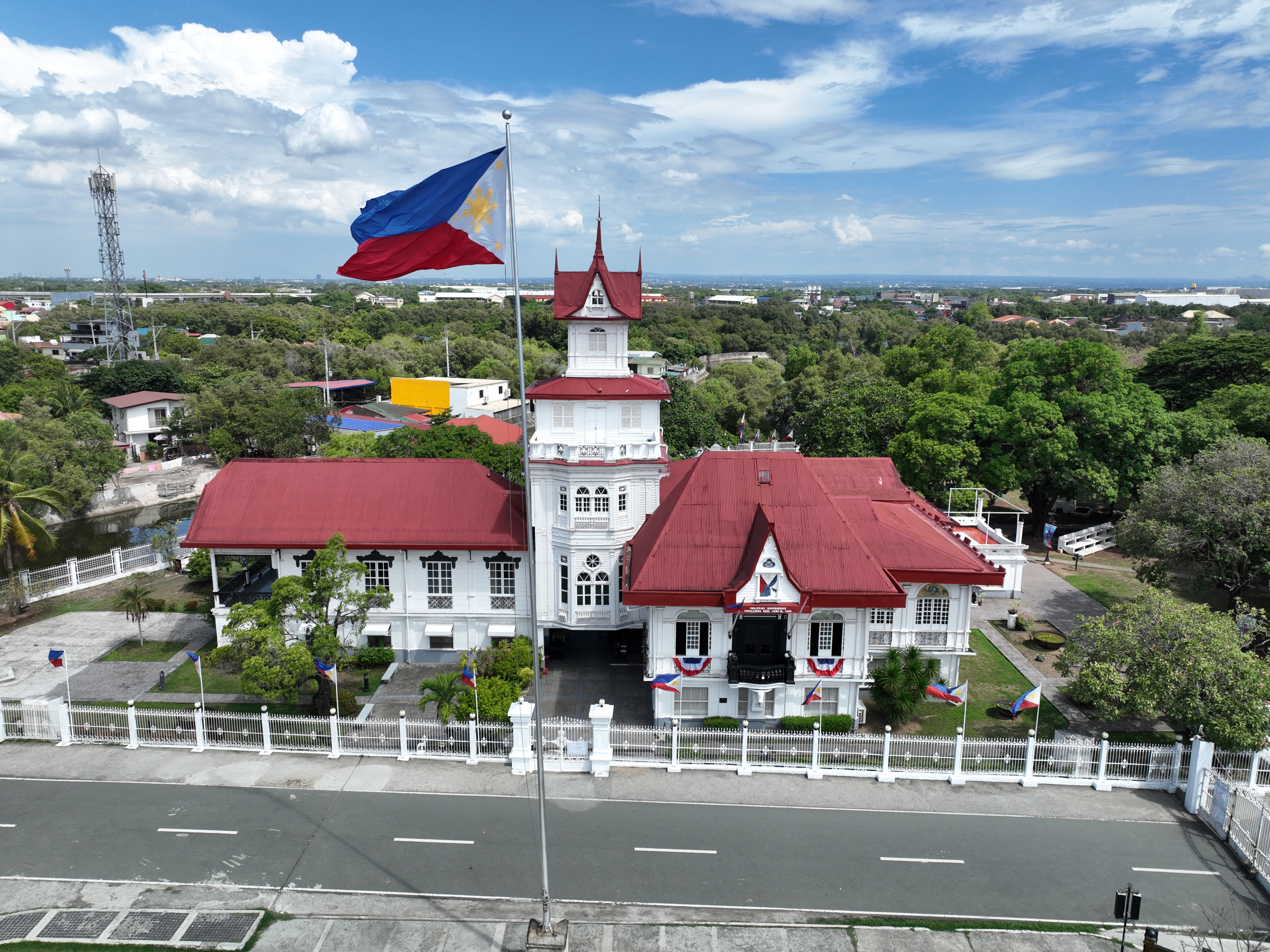
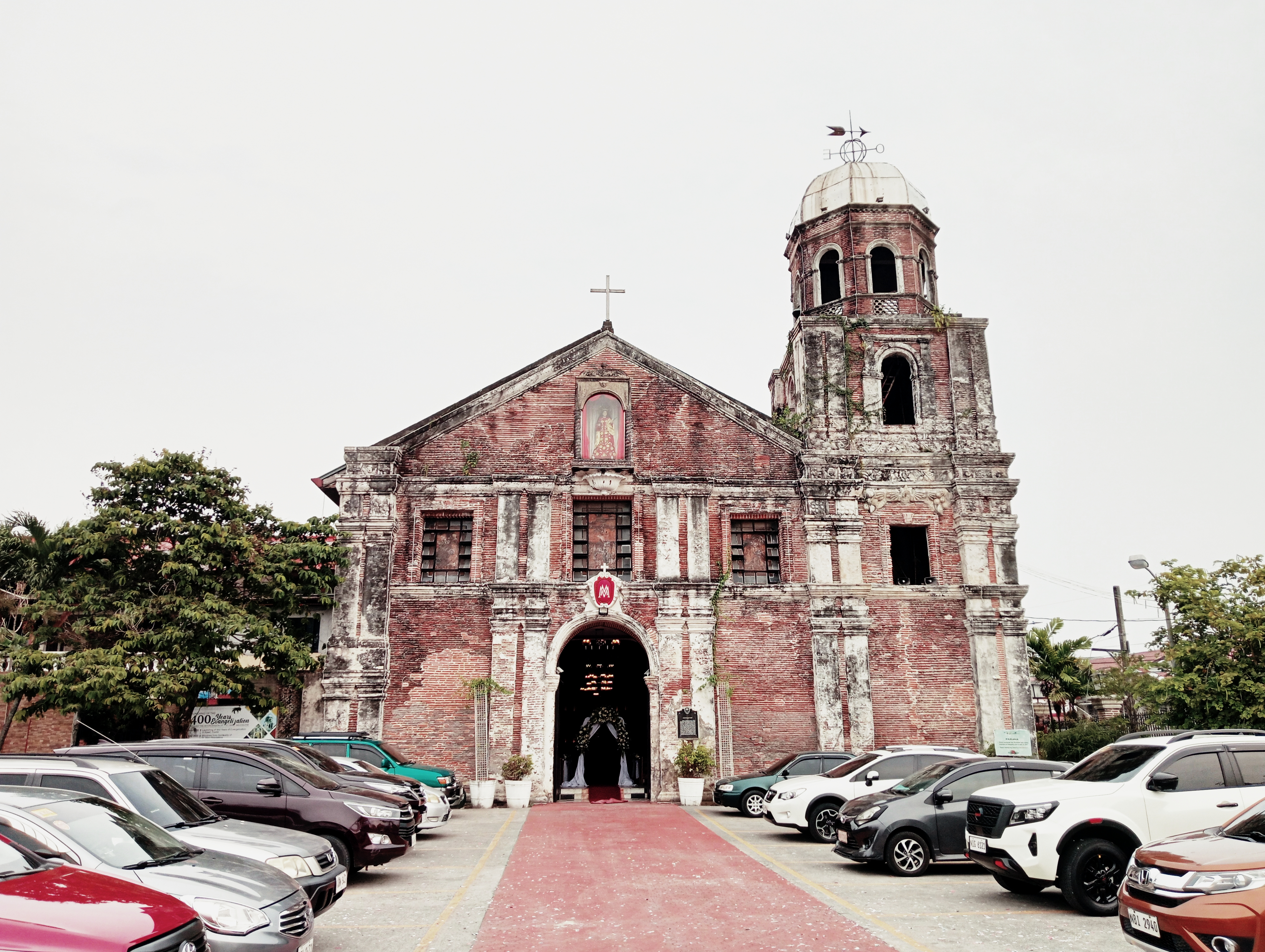
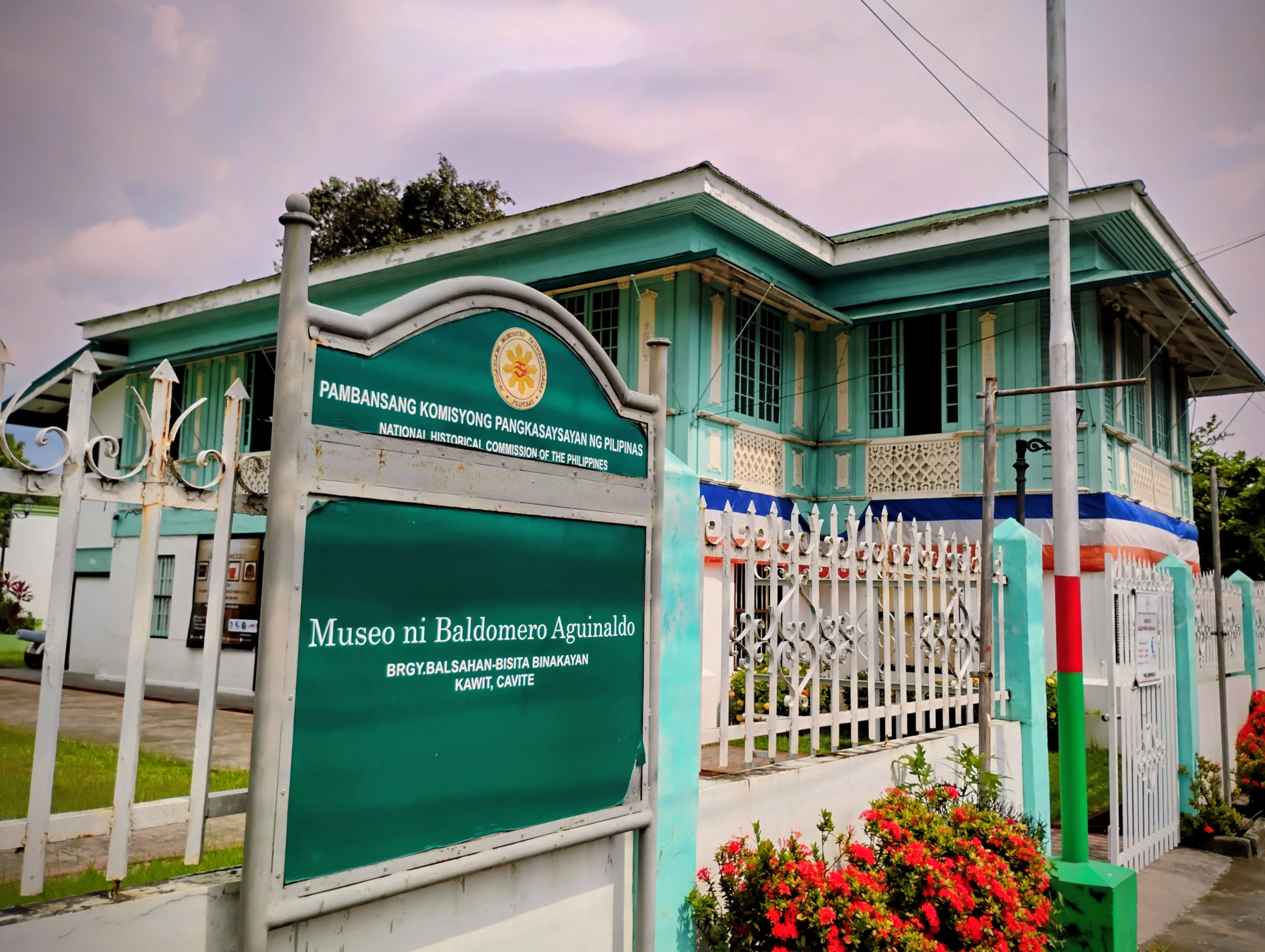
- Aguinaldo Shrine Saint Mary Magdalene Parish Church Baldomero Aguinaldo Ancestral House

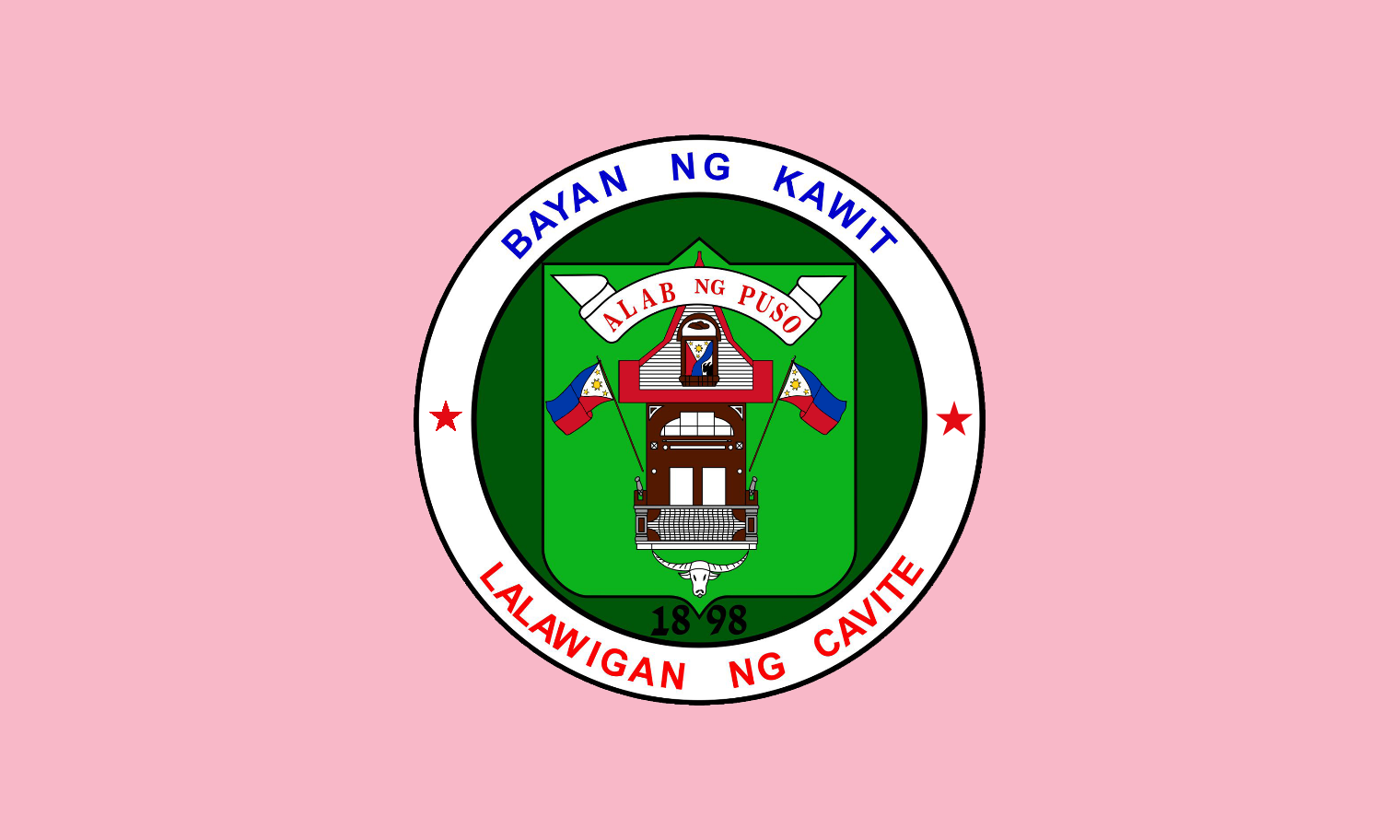
- Flag Seal
- Nicknames: Site of the Declaration of Independence, Flag Town of the Republic
- Motto: Alab ng Puso (Flaming Heart)
- Map of Cavite with Kawit highlighted
- Interactive map of Kawit
- Location within the Philippines
- Coordinates: 14°26′N 120°54′E
- Country: Philippines
- Region: Calabarzon
- Province: Cavite
- District: 1st district
- Founded: 1587 or August 1, 1600
- Renamed: September 20, 1907 (as Kawit)
- Barangays: 23 (see Barangays)

Government
  - Type: Sangguniang Bayan
  - Mayor: Armie Aguinaldo
  - Vice Mayor: Angelo Aguinaldo
  - Representative: Ramon Revilla III
  - Municipal Council: Members: Eman R. Tuazon; Alvin S. Bunag; Divinia R. Pulido; Juan Ysmael R. Gandia; Gerardo B. Jarin; Bienvenido D. Cajigas III; Cynthia G. Aguinaldo; Medel E. Caimol
  - Electorate: 69,598 voters (2025)

Area
  - Total: 25.15 km^{2} (9.71 sq mi)
- Elevation: 6.0 m (19.7 ft)
- Highest elevation: 47 m (154 ft)
- Lowest elevation: 0 m (0 ft)

Population (2024 census)
  - Total: 123,631
  - Density: 4,916/km^{2} (12,730/sq mi)
  - Households: 29,082
- Demonym: Kawiteño

Economy
  - Income class: 1st municipal income class
  - Poverty incidence: 11.52% (2023)
  - Revenue: ₱ 714.4 million (2024)
  - Assets: ₱ 1,065 million (2024)
  - Expenditure: ₱ 458.5 million (2024)
  - Liabilities: ₱ 566.3 million (2024)

Service provider
  - Electricity: Manila Electric Company (Meralco)
- Time zone: UTC+8 (PST)
- ZIP code: 4104
- PSGC: 0402111000
- IDD : area code: +63 (0)46
- Native languages: Tagalog
- Major religions: Catholic
- Catholic diocese: Roman Catholic Diocese of Imus
- Patron saint: St. Mary Magdalene

Kawit, officially the Municipality of Kawit (Tagalog: Bayan ng Kawit), is an urban municipality in the province of Cavite, Philippines. According to the 2024 census, it has a population of 123,631 people.

It is one of the notable places that had a major role in the country's history during the 1800s and 1900s.

Formerly known as Cavite el Viejo, it is known as the birthplace of Emilio Aguinaldo, the 1st President of the Philippines, who from 1895 to 1897, served as the municipality's chief executive. The Aguinaldo home, where independence from Spain was declared on June 12, 1898, is now formally called the Aguinaldo Shrine.

== Etymology ==
The name Kawit is derived from the Tagalog word kawit or kalawit (hook) or a larger fishing contraption, which is suggestive of its location at the base of a hook-shaped shoreline along Manila Bay extending to the tip of Cavite City. It also refers to the area's traditional pescetarian lifestyle and cuisine.

Legend, however, gives another version on how the town got its name. One day, a Spanish visitor once asked a native blacksmith the name of the village. Preoccupied with hammering a piece of hot metal shaped like a hook, the blacksmith misunderstood and replied kawit, describing his work. The Spaniards repeated the word, which over time transformed into Cauite and ultimately into Cavite.

== History ==
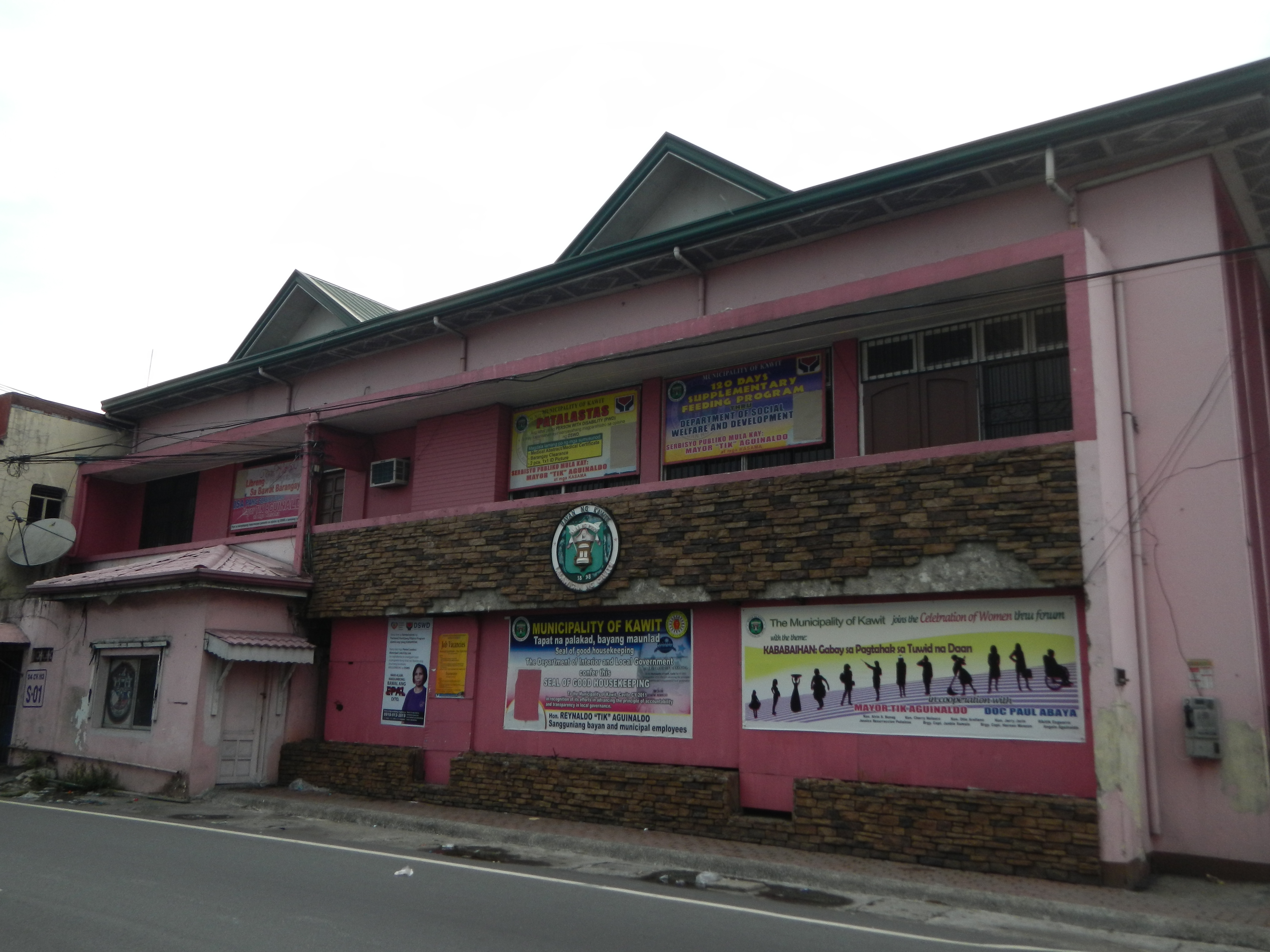
Old Kawit Town Hall

Kawit was the most thriving settlement prior to the coming of the Spanish. In fact, the town provided the first anchorage of the Spanish in the province, whence colonization and proselytization of the Christian religion began, spreading to all corners of the province. It was established as a town in 1587 or, as recognized by laws, on August 1, 1600.

For a long time, the place was called by the Spanish "Cavite el Viejo" or Old Cavite to distinguish it from "Cavite la Punta" or "Cavite el Puerto", the commercial port and naval base (now Cavite City) whence came many Spanish marines on shore leave who made frequent visits to Cavite el Viejo, eventually turning it into a red-light district. This seedy reputation of the town was erased when Saint Mary Magdalene was made patroness, under the spiritual supervision of the Jesuits as ordered by Miguel García Serrano, O.S.A. (1618–1629), the fifth Archbishop of Manila. The 1818 Spanish census showed the area had 1,855 native families and 55 Spanish-Filipino families.

With the establishment in the wake of the Philippine Revolution, the Philippine Independent Church built a shrine to Saint Michael, the Archangel in the barrio of Binakayan in 1902.

Cavite el Viejo was then a big town, comprising the municipality of Kawit today, Cavite la Punta (now Cavite City), Noveleta (called Tierra Alta by the Spanish), and Imus. Eventually, these three barrios' populations grew and they eventually seceded to become independent municipalities.

Aside from its role as the birthplace of independence, Kawit was also the site of the Battle of Binakayan-Dalahican, one of several Filipino victories during the Revolution.

In 1907, the town was renamed to Kawit, its present name, by virtue of Act No. 1718 by the Philippine Commission.

== Geography ==
Kawit is 13 kilometres (8.1 mi) from Imus and 23 kilometres (14 mi) from Manila. It is bounded by Bacoor to the northeast, with the Imus River and the Binakayan Bridge marking part of their boundary; Imus to the south and east; General Trias to the southwest; Noveleta to the west; and Cavite City to the northwest.

=== Barangays ===
Kawit is politically subdivided into 23 barangays, as indicated below. Each barangay consists of puroks and some have sitios.

- Balsahan-Bisita
- Batong Dalig
- Binakayan-Aplaya
- Binakayan-Kanluran
- Congbalay-Legaspi
- Gahak
- Kaingen
- Magdalo (Putol)
- Manggahan-Lawin
- Marulas
- Panamitan
- Poblacion
- Pulvorista/Polvorista
- Samala-Marquez
- San Sebastian
- Santa Isabel
- Tabon I
- Tabon II
- Tabon III
- Toclong (Different from Toclong in neighboring Imus)
- Tramo-Bantayan
- Wakas I
- Wakas II

=== Climate ===
Climate data for Kawit, Cavite
Month	Jan	Feb	Mar	Apr	May	Jun	Jul	Aug	Sep	Oct	Nov	Dec	Year
Mean daily maximum °C (°F)	29 (84)	30 (86)	32 (90)	34 (93)	32 (90)	31 (88)	29 (84)	29 (84)	29 (84)	30 (86)	30 (86)	29 (84)	30 (87)
Mean daily minimum °C (°F)	21 (70)	20 (68)	21 (70)	22 (72)	24 (75)	25 (77)	24 (75)	24 (75)	24 (75)	23 (73)	22 (72)	21 (70)	23 (73)
Average precipitation mm (inches)	10 (0.4)	10 (0.4)	12 (0.5)	27 (1.1)	94 (3.7)	153 (6.0)	206 (8.1)	190 (7.5)	179 (7.0)	120 (4.7)	54 (2.1)	39 (1.5)	1,094 (43)
Average rainy days	5.2	4.5	6.4	9.2	19.7	24.3	26.9	25.7	24.4	21.0	12.9	9.1	189.3
Source: Meteoblue

== Demographics ==
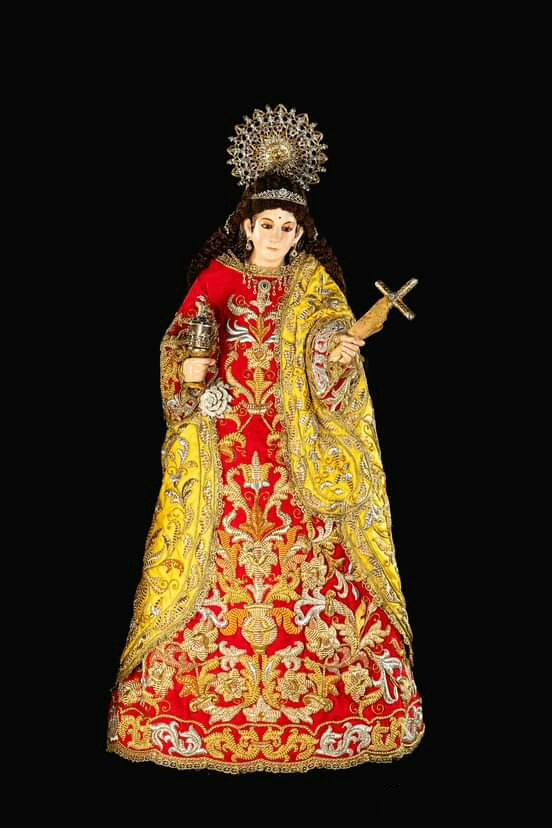
Saint Mary Magdalene, Patroness of Kawit, Cavite.

Population census of Kawit
Year	Pop.	±% p.a.
1903	6,114	—
1918	6,855	+0.77%
1939	10,783	+2.18%
1948	13,970	+2.92%
1960	19,352	+2.75%
1970	28,447	+3.92%
1975	33,813	+3.53%
1980	39,368	+3.09%
1990	47,755	+1.95%
1995	56,993	+3.37%
2000	62,751	+2.08%
2007	76,405	+2.75%
2010	78,209	+0.85%
2015	83,466	+1.25%
2020	107,535	+5.48%
2024	123,631	+3.41%
Source: Philippine Statistics Authority

In the 2024 census, the population of Kawit was 123,631 people, with a density of 5,400 inhabitants per square kilometer or 14,000 inhabitants per square mile.

== Economy ==
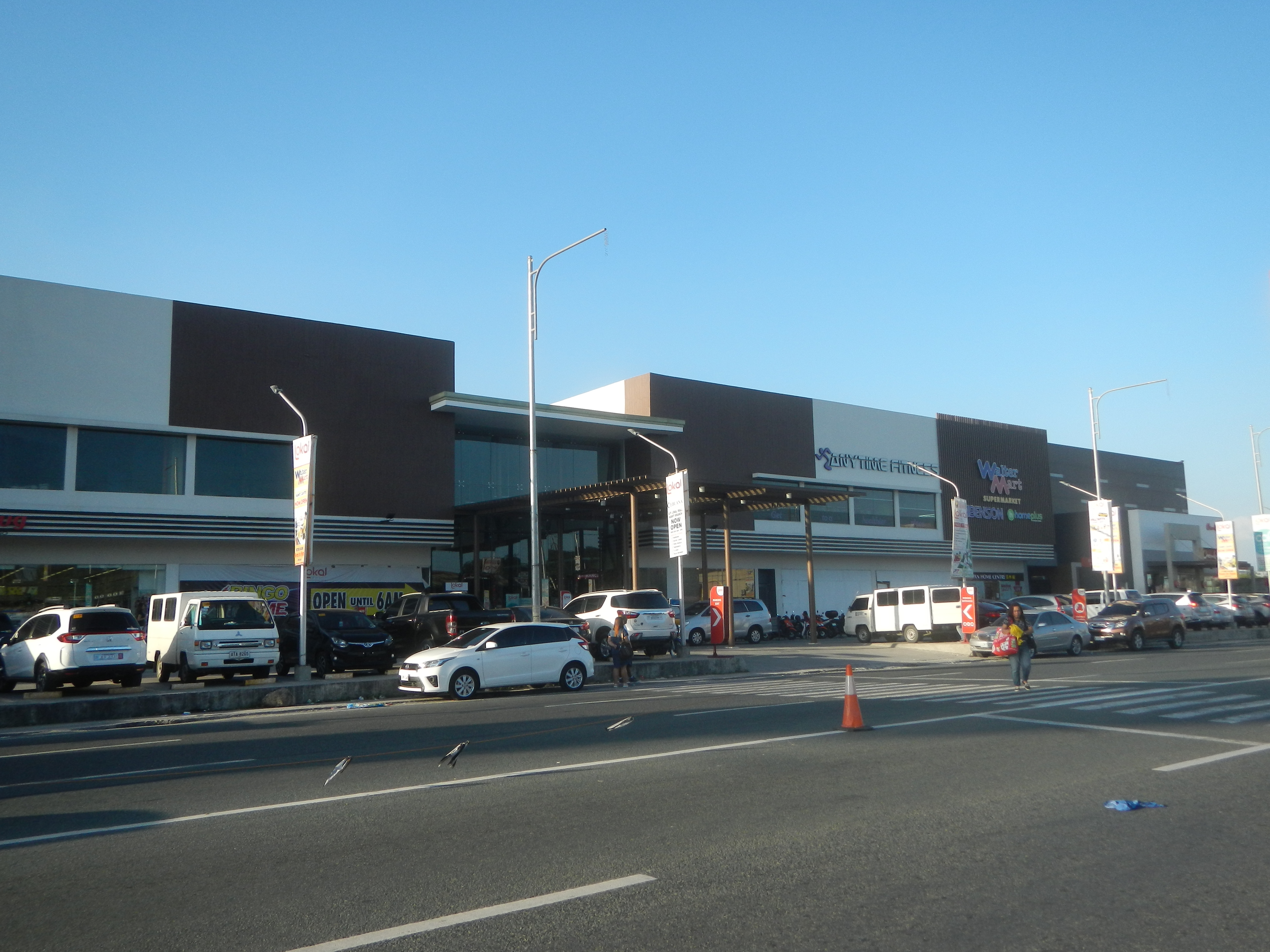
Lokal Mall Kawit along Antero Soriano Highway (Centennial Road)

Poverty incidence of Kawit (%)

Source: Philippine Statistics Authority

== Culture ==
=== Maytinis Festival ===
An original Kawit tradition that takes place every Christmas Eve, a dramatic retelling of the Virgin Mary and Joseph's search in Bethlehem for a place to stay called "Panunuluyan". This reenactment happens on the streets of Kawit with different floats depicting different biblical scenes from Adam and Eve up to Mary and Joseph. The "Panunuluyan" takes place in several houses and is done in singing until it reaches the 400-year-old St. Mary Magdalene Church, where the Virgin Mary and Joseph are welcomed by angels in a giant belen (Nativity Scene), which covers the whole main Retablo or altarpiece of the church. The songs performed by the angels acted by little girls are mostly in Spanish and Tagalog.

== Government ==
The current Kawit Municipal Hall along Antero Soriano Highway

=== Local government ===
Like any other Philippine municipality, Kawit is headed by a municipal mayor, vice mayor, and 10 councilors, eight of them elected at large by the voting populace and two of them being sectoral representatives (one for the barangays and one for the youth, elected respectively through their federations).

The mayor is assisted by the vice mayor, who presides over a legislative council. The current mayor of the historical town is Armie Aguinaldo, mother of former mayor and current vice mayor Angelo Emilio G. Aguinaldo, a descendant of the first officially recognized President of the Philippines, General Emilio Aguinaldo.

== Education ==
The Kawit Schools District Office governs all educational institutions within the municipality. It oversees the management and operations of all private and public, from primary to secondary schools.

=== Primary and elementary schools ===
- Academia Archangeli Learning School
- Aguinaldo Elementary School
- Batong Dalig Elementary School
- Bertrand Russell Academy
- Binakayan Elementary School
- Brickwood School
- Child Development and Guidance Center
- Florante Ilano Memorial Elementary School
- Gahak-Marulas Elementary School
- I Best Academy
- Kaingen-Poblacion Elementary School
- Little Huge Steps Preschool
- Living Stream Christian School
- Mary Calkins School
- Mary Montessori School
- Mil Den Academy
- Our Lady of Fatima Academy
- Panamitan Elementary School
- Perpetuo Succor Developmental Reading and Learning Center
- Potol-Sta. Isabel Elementary School
- St. Mary Magdalene School
- Students' Haven Tutorial and Learning Center
- Toclong Elementary School
- Tramo Elementary School
- Wakas Elementary School

=== Secondary schools ===
- Binakayan National High School
- Emiliano T. Tirona Memorial National High School
- Integrated School of Science
- saint mary magdalene school

== Sister city ==
- Sakegawa, Yamagata, Japan

== Notable people ==
- Emilio Aguinaldo - 1st Philippine president & Filipino revolutionary leader
- Cesar Virata - Former prime minister and finance minister of the Philippines
- Baldomero Aguinaldo - Leader of the Magdalo Faction in the Katipunan
- Candido Tirona - Filipino revolutionary leader
- Daniel Tirona - Filipino politician known for maligning Andres Bonifacio
- Tomás Mascardo - Filipino revolutionary leader and Governor of Cavite
- Emiliano Tría Tirona - Filipino lawyer and politician
- Augusto Victa - Filipino actor
- Rolando Tria Tirona - Prelate of the Catholic Church of the Philippines
- Benjamin Tría Tirona - Former ambassador of the Philippines to South Korea and provincial official
- Maximiano S Janairo - Retired US Army Colonel, lawyer and West Point graduate
- Dia Maté - Singer and beauty queen

== Images ==
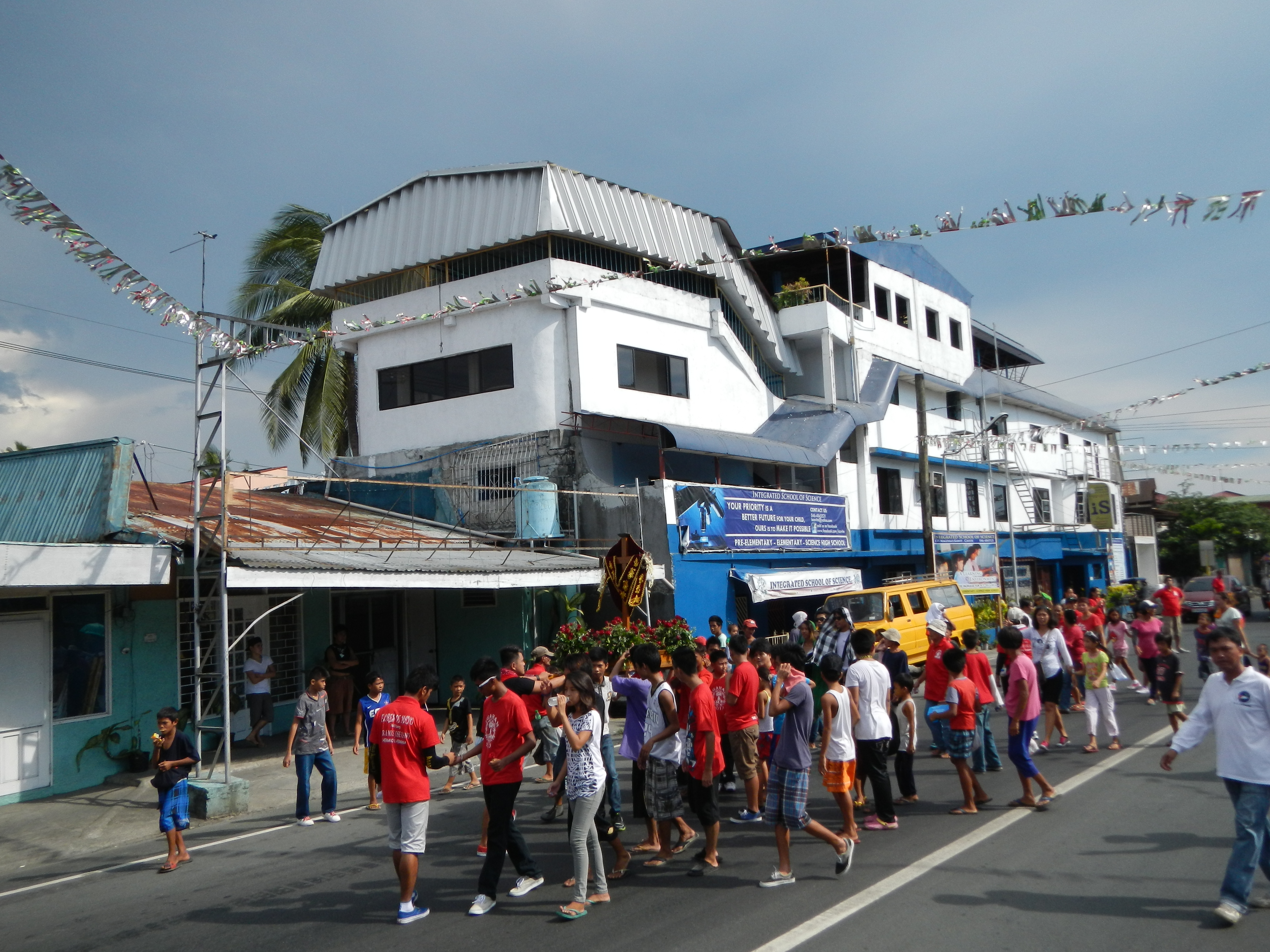
Procession (Karakol, dancing)

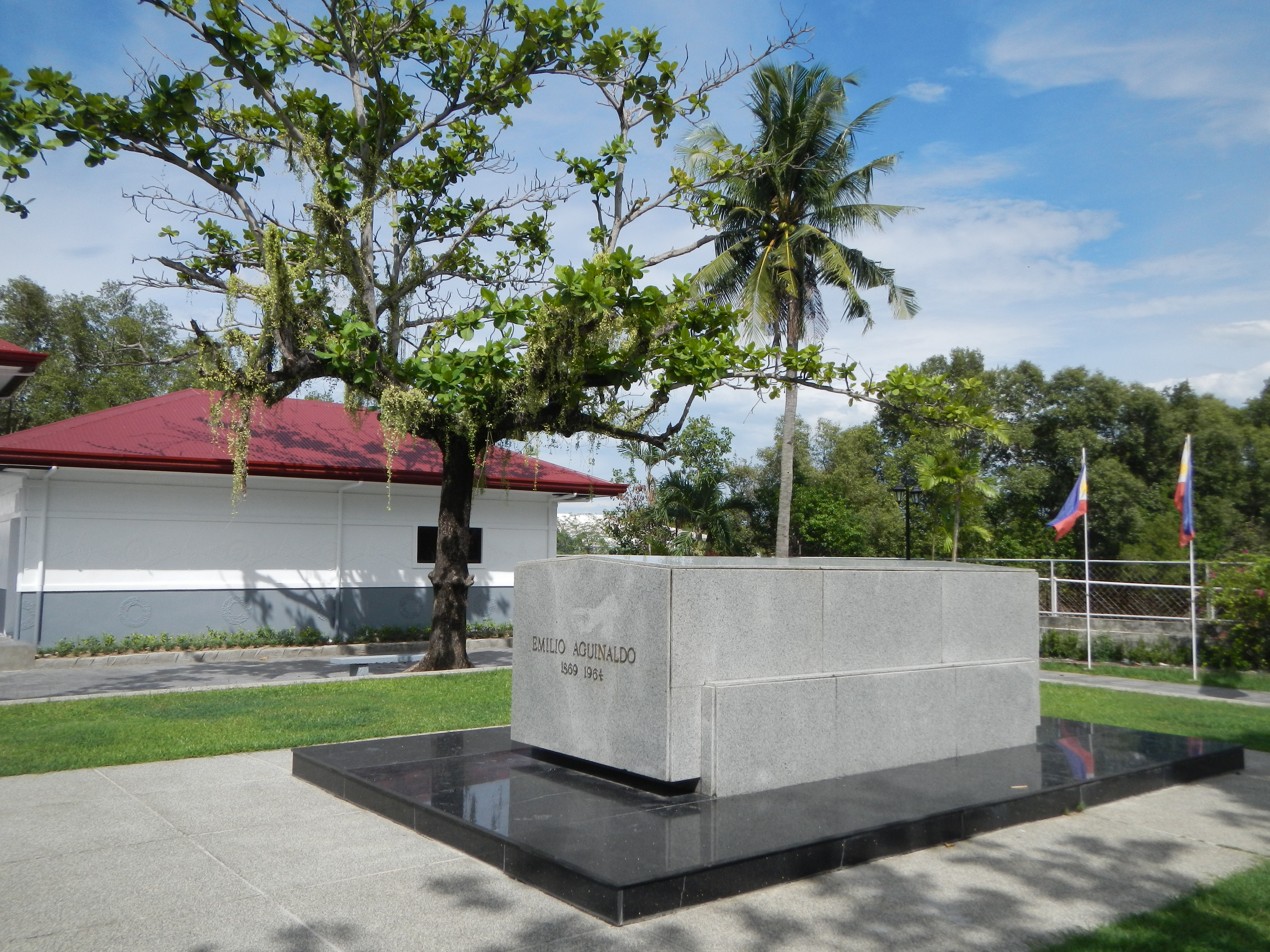
Emilio Aguinaldo tomb

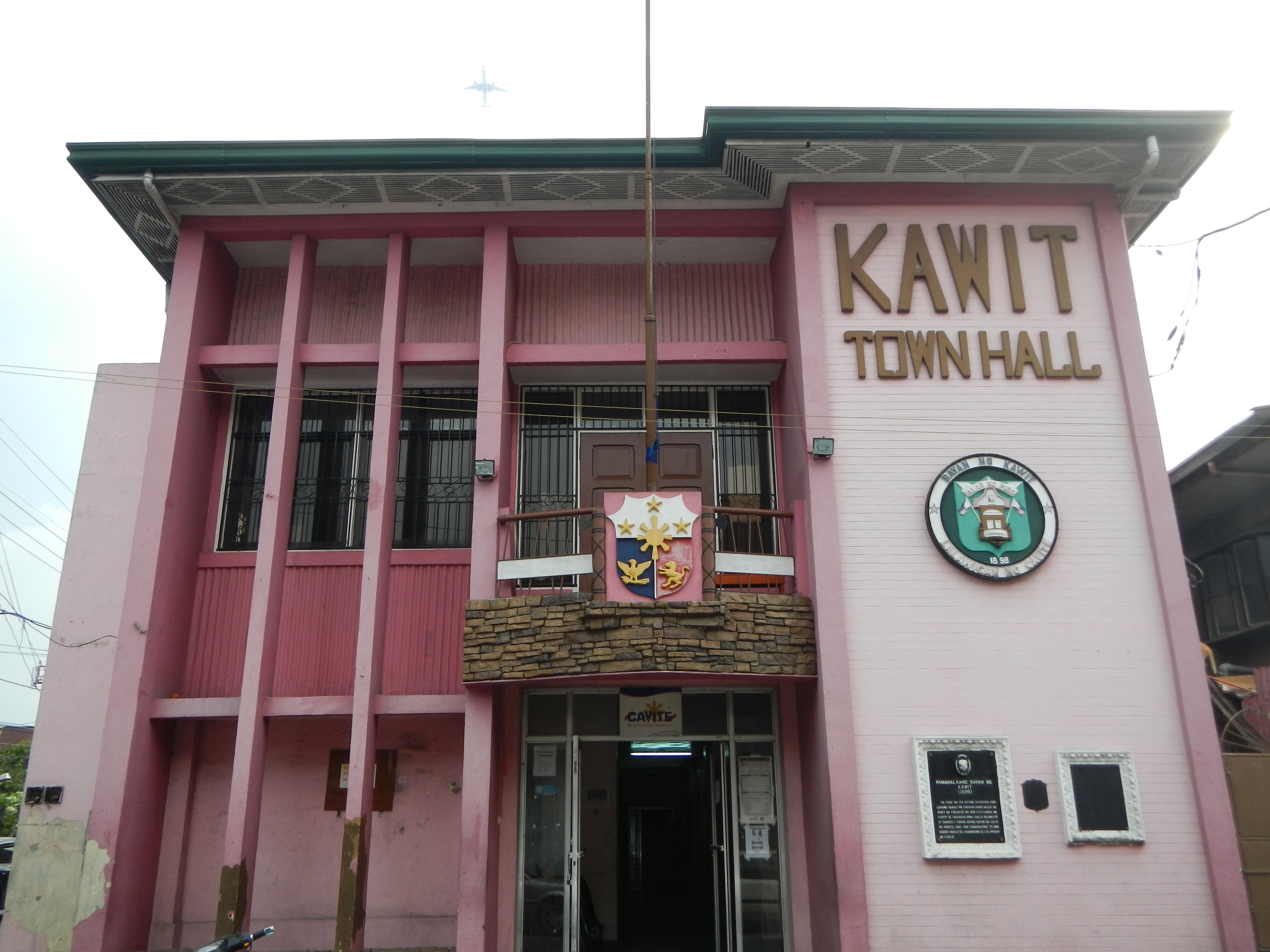
Old Town Hall facade

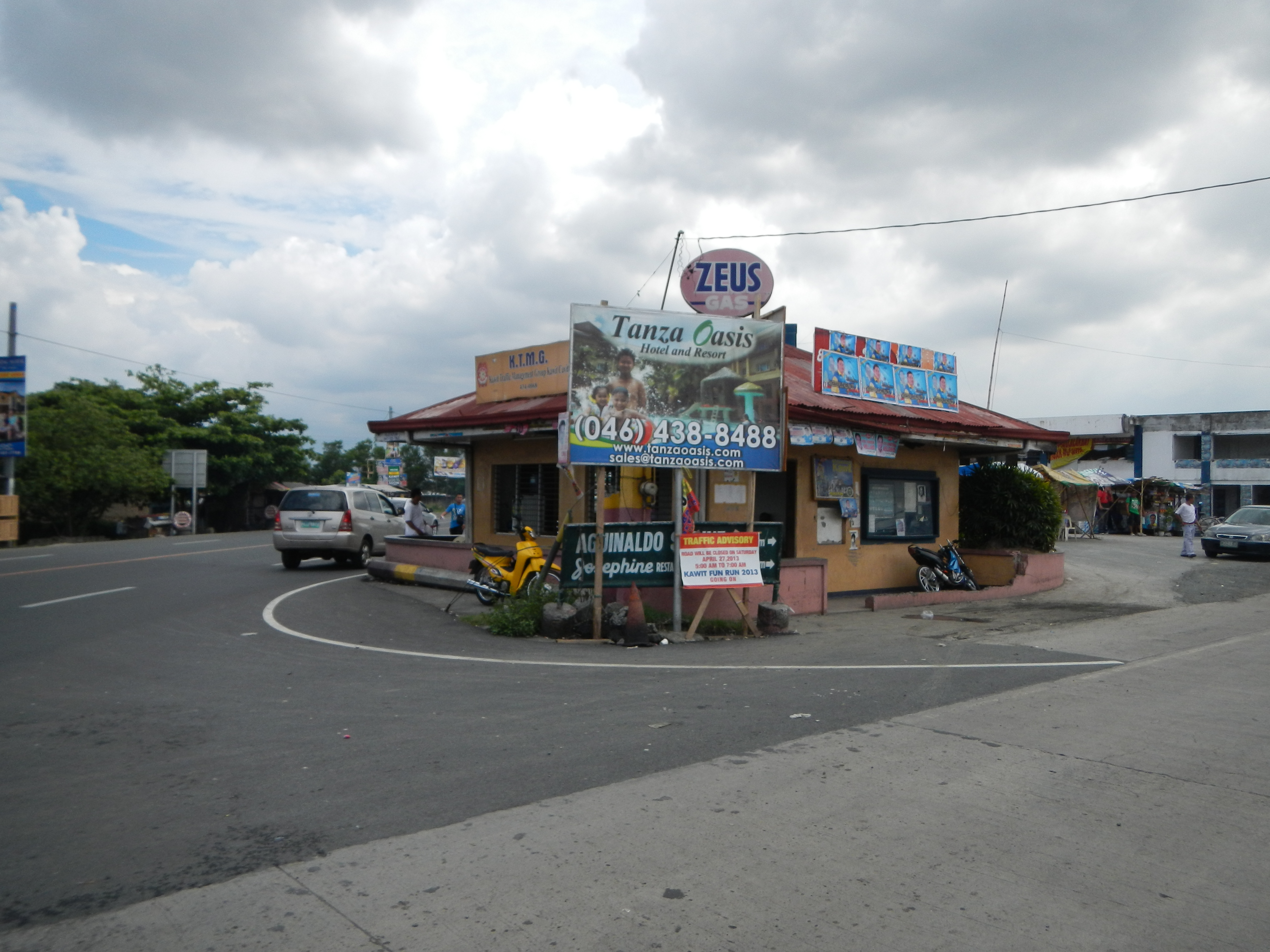
Junction

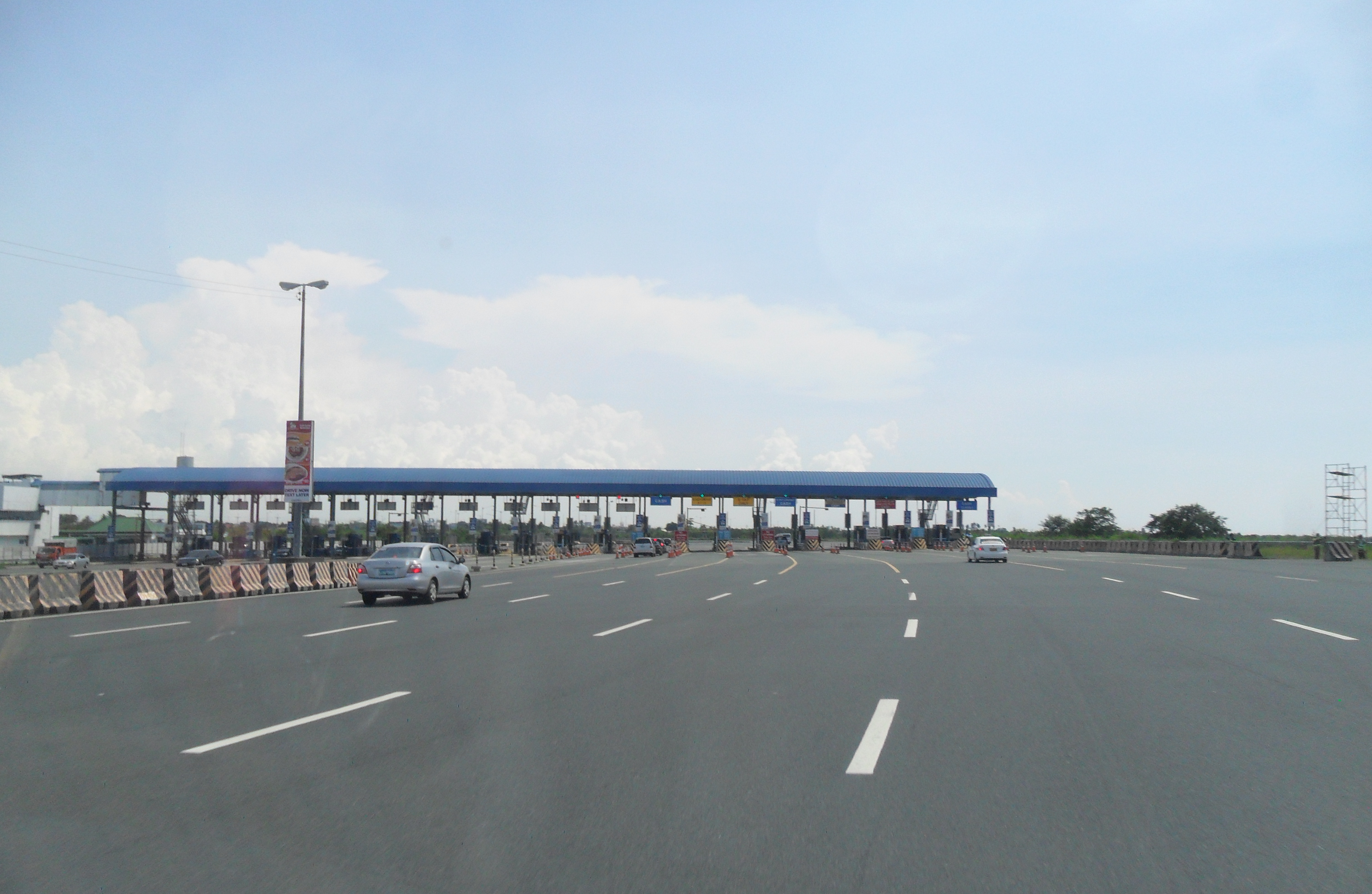
Kawit Toll Plaza of Manila–Cavite Expressway (CAVITEX)

== See also ==
- Aguinaldo Shrine
- St. Michael the Archangel Parish of Binakayan (Aglipayan Church)
- St. Mary Magdalene Church (Kawit)
- Baldomero Aguinaldo Shrine
- Battle of Binakayan-Dalahican
- Kawit revolt, 1896
- Kawit shooting, 2013

Preceded by San Miguel, Bulacan	Capital of the Philippines; June–July 1898	Succeeded by Bacoor
