= Maliksi River =

River in Cavite, Philippines

- Aerial view of the Longos area in Bacoor, Cavite, showing a portion of the Zapote River (left) and the surrounding built-up area. Maliksi River is visible near the lower-right portion of the image, adjacent to a construction site and near the Aguinaldo Boulevard.

- Maliksi River mouth Maliksi River (Luzon) Maliksi River (Philippines)

Location
- Country: Philippines
- Region: Calabarzon
- Province: Cavite
- City: Bacoor

Physical characteristics
- Source
  - location: Near Real Street, Zapote Kalinisan, Bacoor, Cavite
  - coordinates: 14.4631°N 120.9627°E
- Mouth
  - location: Bacoor Bay, Manila Bay
  - coordinates: 14.4637°N 120.9502°E

Basin features
- Progression: Bacoor Bay to Manila Bay

Maliksi River is a river in Bacoor, Cavite, Philippines.

== Flood control ==
The DPWH Cavite 3rd District Engineering Office's indicative annual procurement plan for fiscal year 2021 includes the Construction of Revetment, Maliksi River, Brgy. Talaba, Bacoor under its flood management program. In October 2025, the Bacoor city government met with the DPWH Cavite Sub-District Engineering Office to discuss flood mitigation and river revetment. The city reported that only 560 metres remained for the Maliksi River project. In November 2025, Bacoor passed a resolution authorizing the implementation of the construction of slope protection and other improvements for Maliksi River, amounting to ₱70,000,000.
