= Bacoor River =

River in Luzon, Philippines

Bacoor River Mestizo River Banalo River
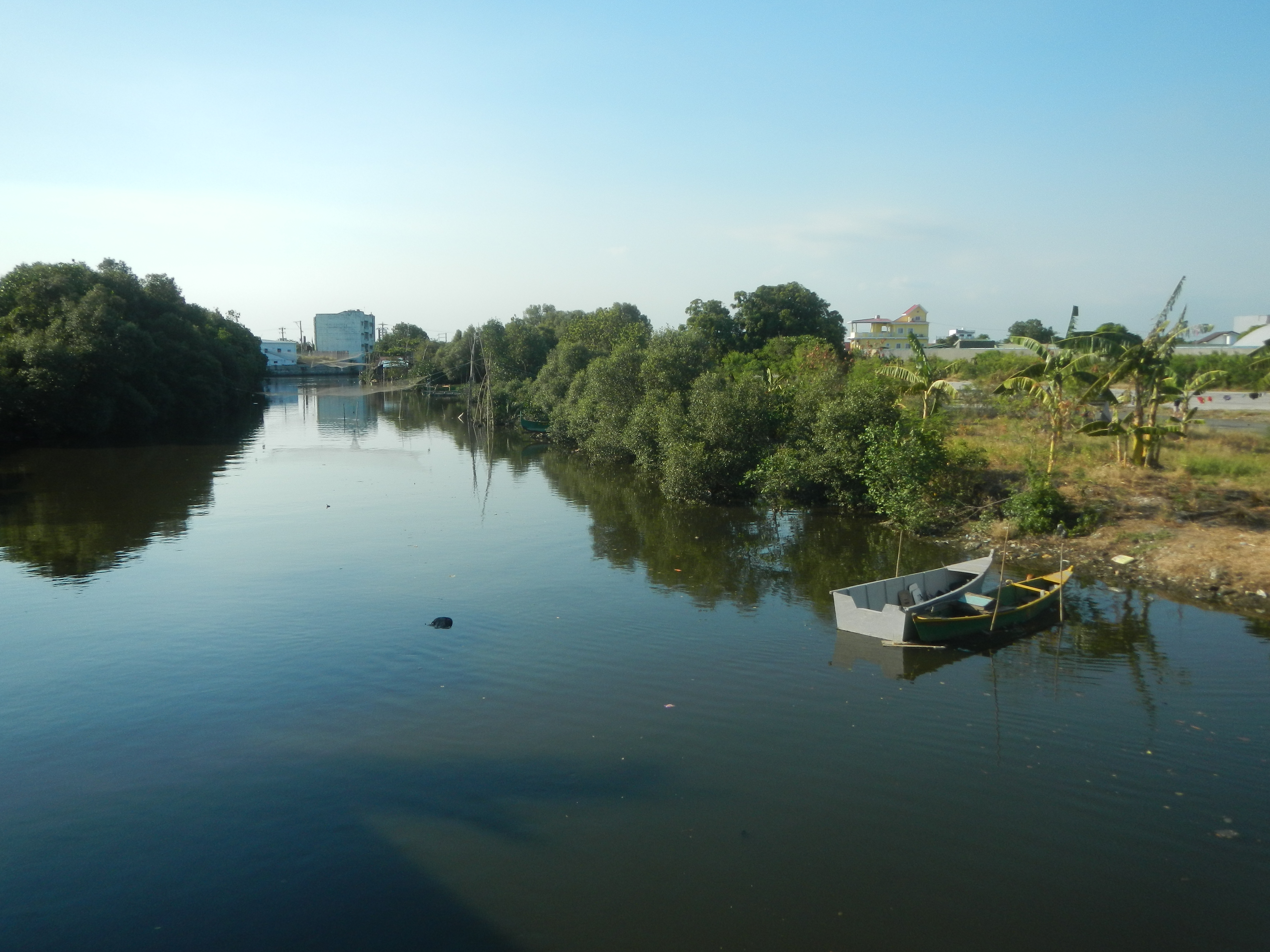
- Bacoor River in Mabolo barangays

- Bacoor River mouth Bacoor River (Luzon) Bacoor River (Philippines)

Location
- Country: Philippines
- Region: Calabarzon
- Province: Cavite
- City: Bacoor, Imus

Physical characteristics
- Source
  - location: Near Molino Road, Bacoor, Cavite
  - coordinates: 14.373351°N 120.979793°E
- Mouth
  - location: Bacoor Bay, Manila Bay
  - coordinates: 14.4553°N 120.9280°E
- Length: 16 km (9.9 mi)

Basin features
- Progression: Bacoor Bay to Manila Bay
- Tributaries
  - left: Daang Bukid Creek

Bacoor River, also known as Mestizo River and Banalo River, is a major river system in the city of Bacoor, Cavite, Philippines. Measuring approximately 16 km (9.9 mi) in length, the river serves as a vital natural drainage channel draining floodwaters from northern Cavite into Bacoor Bay, an inlet of Manila Bay.

== Course ==
The Bacoor River originates in the inland suburban areas near Molino Road in Bacoor. It moves in a northwesterly direction going through areas that are heavily populated, with homes and businesses.

As it flows towards the low-lying coastal plains, the river passes near Buhay na Tubig (along the border of Imus and Bacoor), where it is hydraulically integrated with the Imus River through the Imus–Bacoor retarding basin system, also known as Buhay na Tubig Retention Basin. Continuing downstream parallel to the Imus River, the watercourse crosses major transport corridors, including the Emilio Aguinaldo Highway near SM City Bacoor and the Panapaan Bridge.

In Barangays Mabolo II and Sineguelasan, the Bacoor River meet again with the lower channels of the Imus River before discharging into Bacoor Bay.

== Hydrology and flood control ==
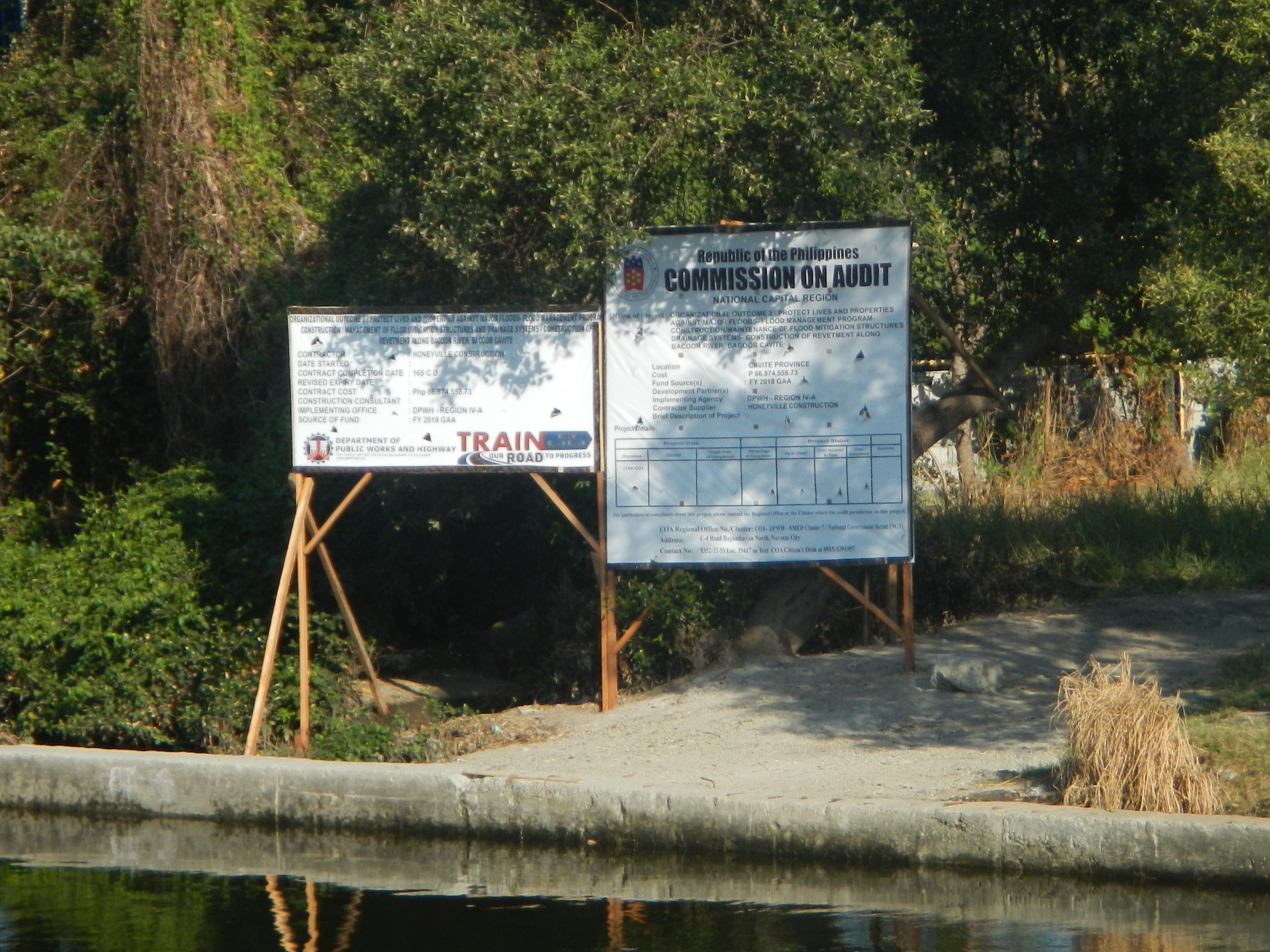
DPWH and Commission on Audit (COA) project information signage for the construction of river revetment structures along the Bacoor River.

The Bacoor River basin is subject to severe seasonal flooding during the typhoon season due to rapid urbanization, heavy siltation, and low-lying coastal topography.

To solve the flooding in the Bacoor and Imus river corridors, the Department of Public Works and Highways (DPWH) worked together with the Japan International Cooperation Agency (JICA) to build a series of off-stream flood retarding basins. The entire project is poised for completion in the fourth quarter of 2021.

=== Retarding basins ===
The Bacoor and Imus retarding basins are flood control facilities that are built to store excess river water when heavy rainfall occurs and to lessen flooding downstream. The project contains flood mitigation components, including surrounding dikes and overflow dikes, drainage sluices, maintenance roads, slope protection works and precast concrete block revetment walls that are built along the Bacoor and Imus retarding basins along their river systems. The Bacoor Retarding Basins (Basins 1 and 2) are intended to manage overflow from the Bacoor River system, while the Imus Retarding Basin is designed to accommodate peak discharges from the Imus River before water is gradually discharged downstream.

In 2023, the Sangguniang Panlungsod of Bacoor enacted local resolutions supporting continuous river dredging, embankment protection, and easement clearing along the river banks.

== Tributaries ==
The Bacoor River network is fed by several small streams and urban drainage channels across Bacoor.

Tributaries of Bacoor River
Name	Confluence Coordinates	Upstream Flow Length	Notes
Unnamed Stream 1	14.4042°N 120.9600°E	5 km (3.1 mi)	Tributary in parallel to the near origin of Bacoor River
Unnamed Stream 2	14.4550°N 120.9331°E	4 km (2.5 mi)	Lower reach tributary
Unnamed Stream 3	14.4158°N 120.9556°E	3 km (1.9 mi)	Mid-stream branch
Daang Bukid Creek	14.4544°N 120.9381°E	3 km (1.9 mi)	Primary named tributary; fed by a minor 64-meter urban branch
Unnamed Stream 5	14.4486°N 120.9525°E	589 m (1,932 ft)	Drainage stream near Panapaan barangays, also crosses Aguinaldo Highway
Unnamed Stream 6	14.4467°N 120.9514°E	123 m (404 ft)	Local urban branch
Unnamed Stream 7	14.4419°N 120.9511°E	86 m (282 ft)	Local urban branch

== See also ==
- Bacoor Bay
- Zapote River
