= Southern Tagalog Regional Hospital =

Government hospital in Cavite, Philippines

Geography
- Location: Bacoor, Cavite, Southern Tagalog, Philippines
- Coordinates: 14°26′29″N 120°56′50″E

Organization
- Type: tertiary level hospital

Services
- Beds: 300

History
- Former name: Bacoor District Hospital

The Southern Tagalog Regional Hospital (STRH; formerly Bacoor District Hospital) is a tertiary level government hospital in Bacoor, Cavite, Philippines. It has a bed capacity of 300.

== History ==
STRH was formerly the Bacoor District Hospital, which was established in 2012 by virtue of the province of Cavite's Sangguniang Panlalawigan Resolution No. 084 Series of 2011. It has a bed capacity of 10. On February 10, 2019, Republic Act No. 11233 was signed into law by President Rodrigo Duterte, which upgraded the district hospital into a general hospital and was to be known as the Southern Tagalog Regional Hospital. Its bed capacity was increased to 100. On May 21, 2025, Republic Act No. 12213 was signed into law by President Bongbong Marcos, which further increased its bed capacity to 300.
