= Bacoor =

Component city in Cavite

- Component city
- City of Bacoor
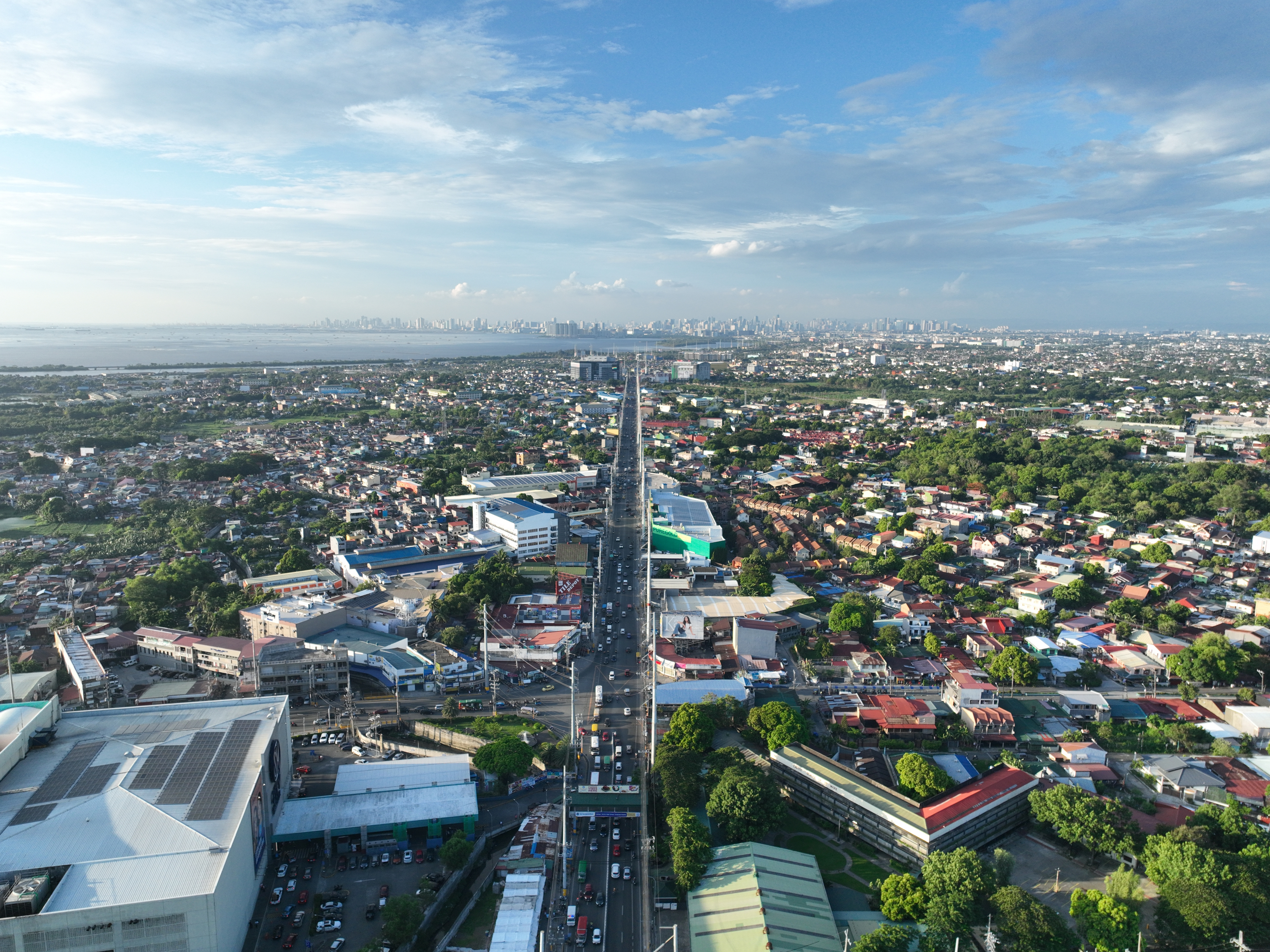
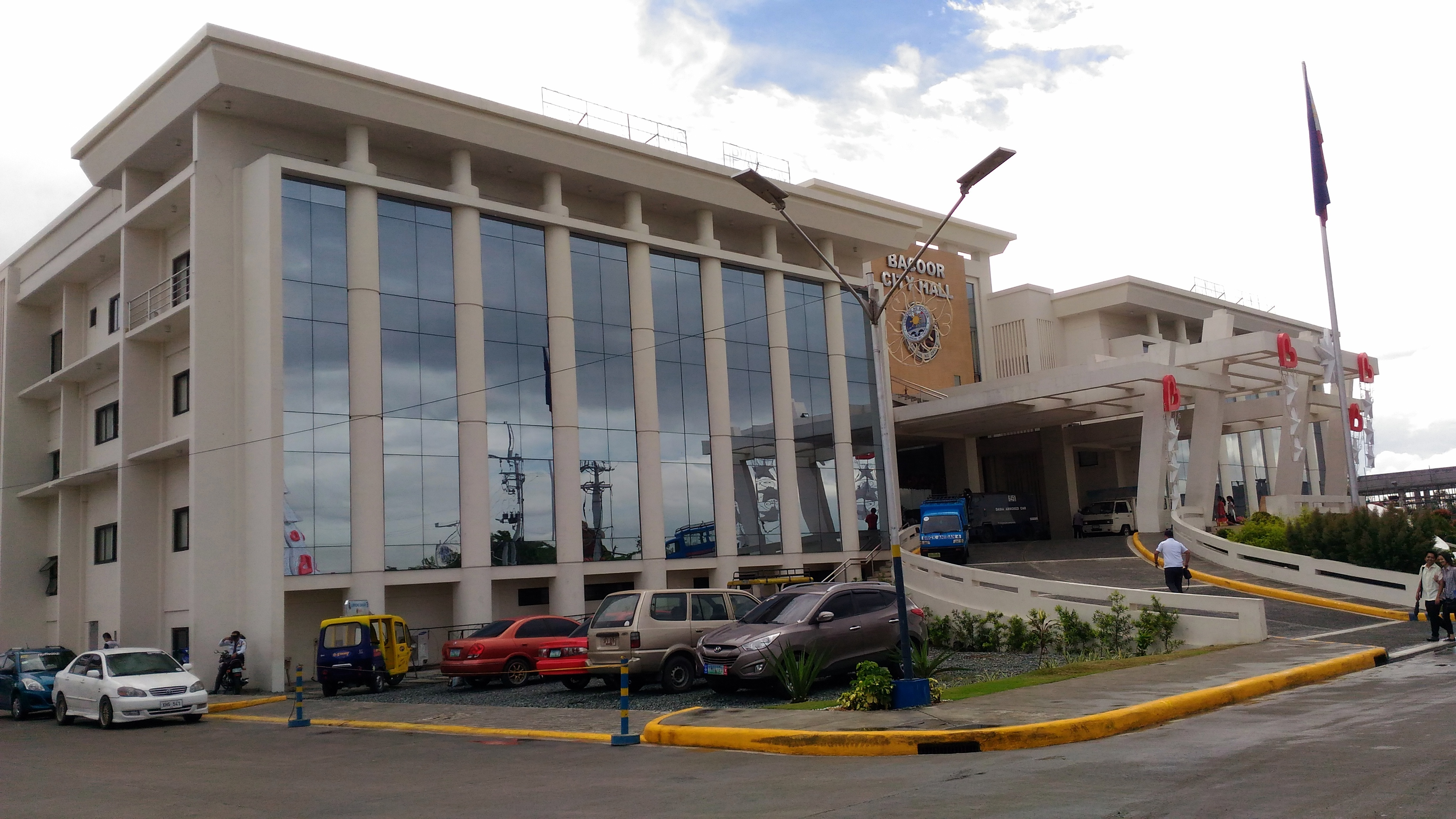
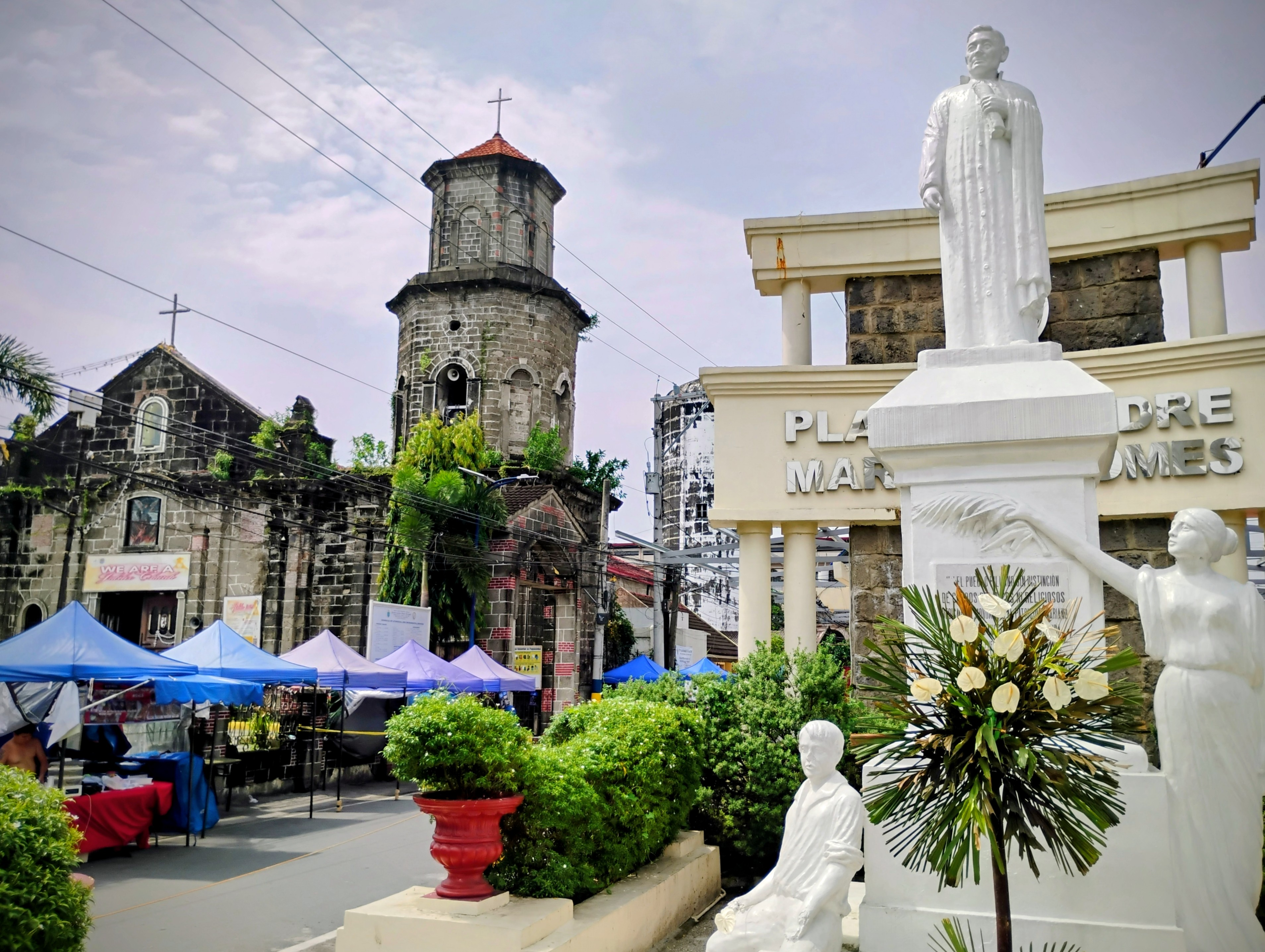
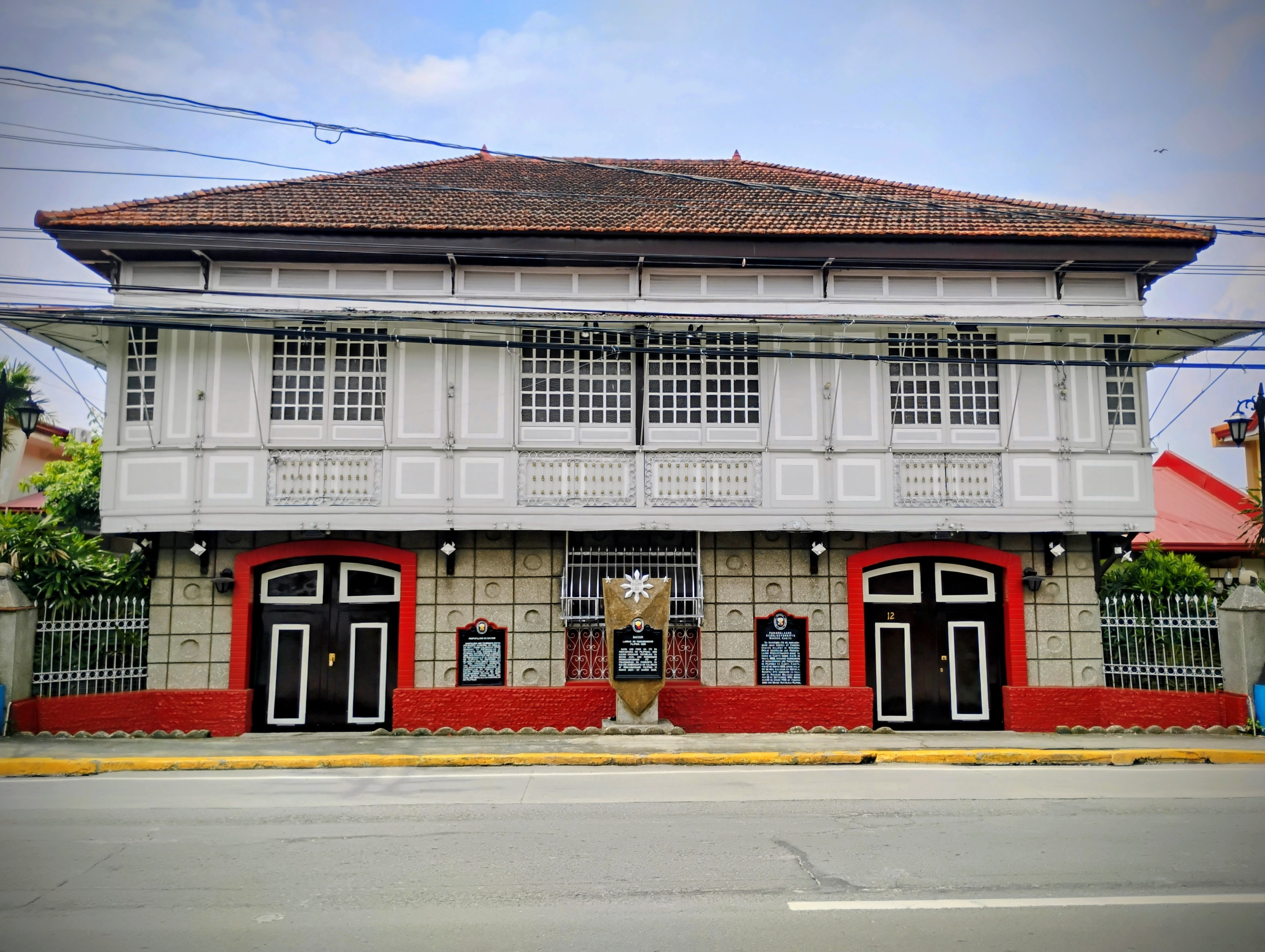
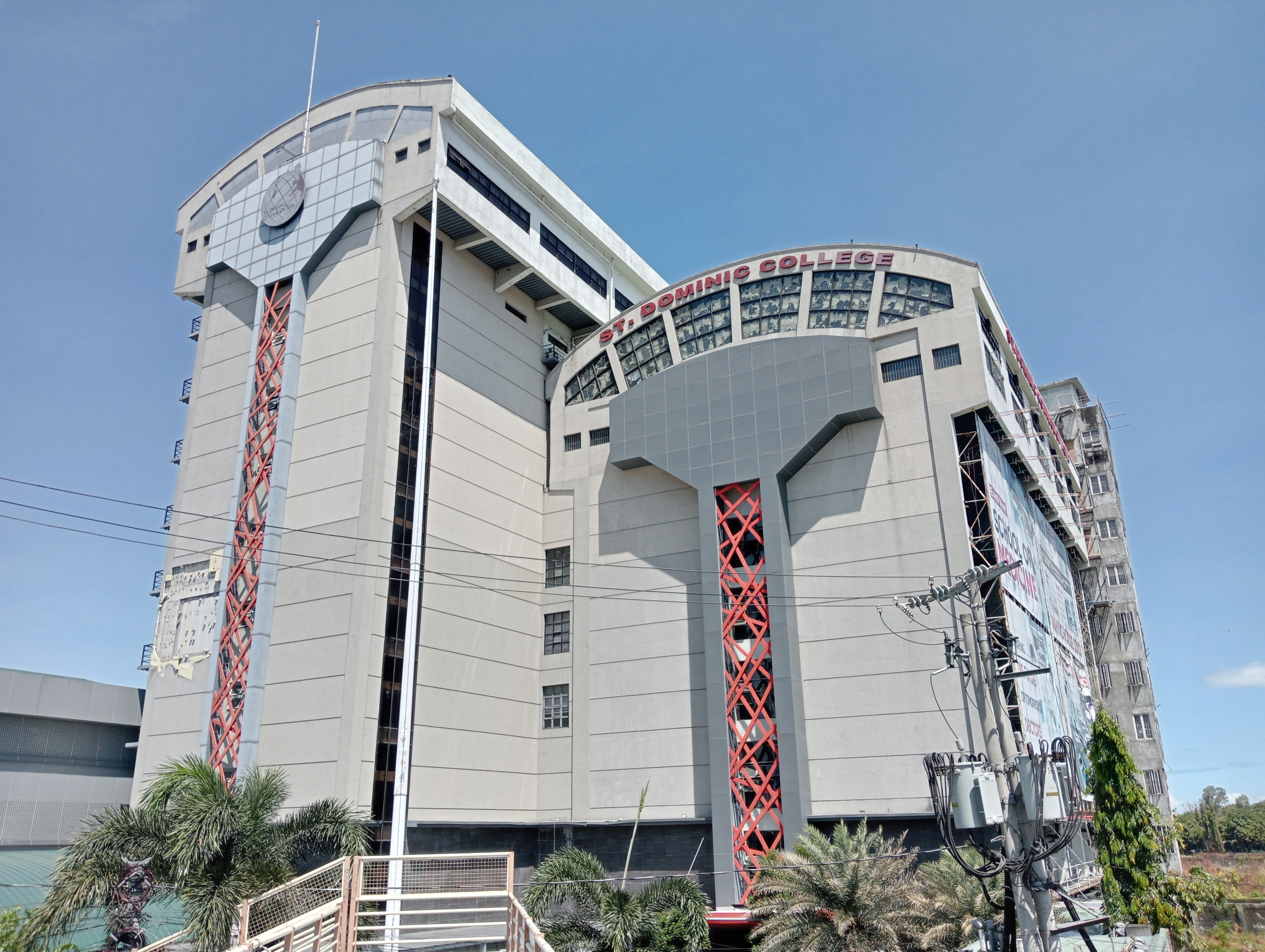
- Skyline Bacoor City Hall Bacoor Church & Plaza de Padre Mariano Gomes Cuenca Ancestral House St. Dominic College of Asia

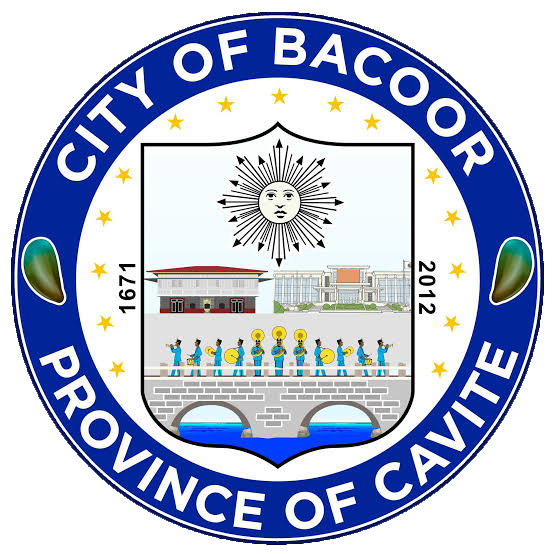
- Seal
- Nicknames: Cavite's Gateway to the Metropolis; Marching Band Capital of the Philippines; City of Transformation
- Motto: Love My Bacoor
- Anthem: Bagong Bacoor; English: New Bacoor
- Map of Cavite with Bacoor highlighted
- Interactive map of Bacoor
- Location within the Philippines
- Coordinates: 14°27′45″N 120°57′52″E
- Country: Philippines
- Region: Calabarzon
- Province: Cavite
- District: 2nd district
- Founded: September 28, 1671
- Annexation to Imus: October 15, 1903
- Chartered: October 24, 1906
- Cityhood: June 23, 2012
- Barangays: 47 (see Barangays)

Government
  - Type: Sangguniang Panlungsod
  - Mayor: Strike B. Revilla
  - Vice Mayor: Rowena B. Mendiola
  - Representative: Lani Mercado-Revilla
  - City Council: Councilors: Bacoor West (District 1); Catherine S. Evaristo; Michael E. Solis; Adrielito G. Gawaran; Vacant; Alejandro F. Gutierrez; Levy M. Tela; Bacoor East (District 2); Roberto L. Advincula; Reynaldo D. Palabrica; Reynaldo M. Fabian; Rogelio M. Nolasco; Alde Joselito F. Pagulayan; Simplicio G. Dominguez; Commission on Elections
  - Electorate: 309,462 voters (2025)

Area
  - Total: 46.17 km^{2} (17.83 sq mi)
- Elevation: 30 m (98 ft)
- Highest elevation: 264 m (866 ft)
- Lowest elevation: 0 m (0 ft)

Population (2024 census)
  - Total: 661,381
  - Density: 14,320/km^{2} (37,100/sq mi)
  - Households: 164,263

Economy
  - Income class: 1st city income class
  - Poverty incidence: 6.59% (2023)
  - Revenue: ₱ 3,540 million (2024)
  - Assets: ₱ 9,195 million (2024)
  - Expenditure: ₱ 2,958 million (2024)
  - Liabilities: ₱ 2,597 million (2024)

Service provider
  - Electricity: Manila Electric Company (Meralco)
  - Water: Maynilad Water Services
- Time zone: UTC+8 (PST)
- ZIP code: 4102
- PSGC: 042103000
- IDD : area code: +63 (0)2
- Native languages: Tagalog
- Major religions: Roman Catholicism, Philippine Independent Church
- Feast date: 2nd Sunday of May, Michaelmas
- Catholic diocese: Diocese of Imus
- Patron saint: St. Michael the Archangel
- Website: www.bacoor.gov.ph

Bacoor (IPA: [bɐkoˈʔoɾ]), officially the City of Bacoor, (Note: Filipino: Lungsod ng Bacoor; Cebuano: Dakbayan sa Bacoor; Cuyonon: Siyudad i'ang Bacoor; Central Bikol: Syudad nin Bacoor; Hiligaynon: Dakbanwa sang Bacoor; Maranao: Bandar a Bacoor; Maguindanaon: Kuta nu Bakoor; Tausug: Dāira sin Bacoor; Ilocano: Siudad ti Bacoor; Kapampangan: Lakanbalen ning Bacoor; Pangasinan: Siyudad na Bacoor; Waray: Syudad han Bacoor) is a component city in the province of Cavite, Philippines. According to the 2024 census, it has a population of 661,381 people., making it the 15th most populous city in the Philippines and the second largest city in the province of Cavite after Dasmariñas.

== Etymology ==
The name of Bacoor is transcribed in old sources variously as "Bacoor", "Bacor", "Bakur", etc. It was originally the name of the Bacoor Bay which separates the Cavite peninsula from the mainland. The name is believed to be originally from the Philippine Negrito languages, meaning "circle", referring to the shape of the bay.

Another possible origin of the name of Bacoor is from Tagalog bakood (also bakulod, bakoor, or bakuwod, etc.) for "highlands" or "plateau" (cf. Bacolor and Bacolod).

== History ==
=== Spanish colonization ===
The 1818 Spanish census showed the area had 1,729 native families and 19 Spanish-Filipino families.

Bacoor was one of the flashpoints of the Cavite Mutiny of 1872. Bacoor's parish priest at that time, Fr. Mariano Gómez, was one of the GOMBURZA trio implicated in the mutiny for advocating the secularization of priesthood in the Philippines. He and the rest of GOMBURZA were executed at Bagumbayan in 1872. The death of the GOMBURZA served as the inspiration for Jose Rizal's El Filibusterismo, which in turn influenced the ignition of the Philippine Revolution.

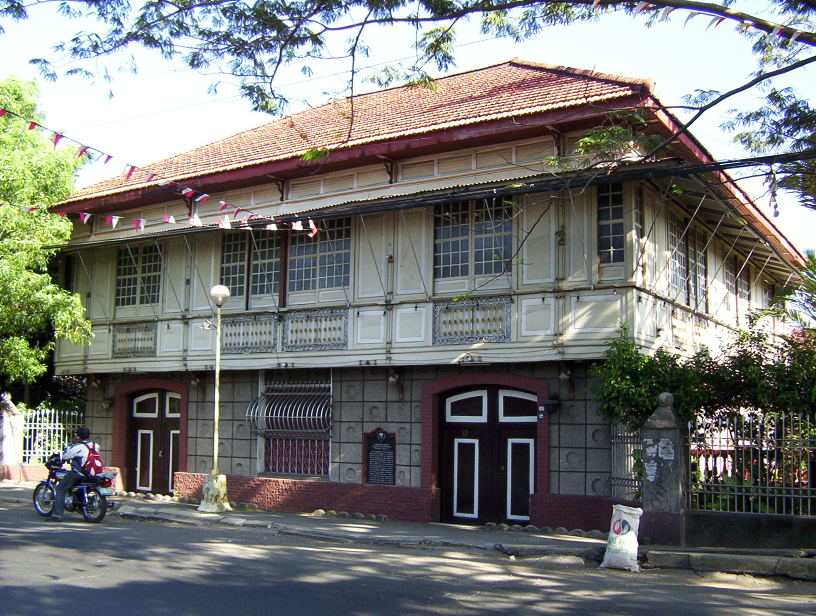
Bahay na bato (Cuenca Ancestral House) served as the headquarters of the Philippine revolutionary government in 1898.

During the Philippine Revolution against Spain in 1896, Bacoor was among the first towns in Cavite to rise in revolt. A local Katipunan chapter, codenamed Gargano and led by Gil Ignacio of Barrio Banalo, initiated hostilities in Bacoor on September 2, 1896, three days after the outbreak of the revolution.

On February 17, 1897, a force of approximately 40,000 under General Emilio Aguinaldo's engaged a 20,000-strong Spanish reinforcement at the Zapote River. Filipino troops fortified the southern bank with trenches designed by engineer Edilberto Evangelista.

Edilberto Evangelista was known as the "Engineer of the revolution" and the "Hero of the revolution". They also blew up the Zapote Bridge with explosives which killed several Spaniards crossing it and thereby preventing them from reaching Cavite and forcing them to retreat to Muntinlupa. Despite the Filipino victory, they lost the brilliant Evangelista who was killed in action.

However, after the Spanish counteroffensive in May 1897, Bacoor and the rest of Cavite finally fell to the Spaniards, forcing Aguinaldo and his men to retreat to Biak-na-Bato.

=== American occupation ===
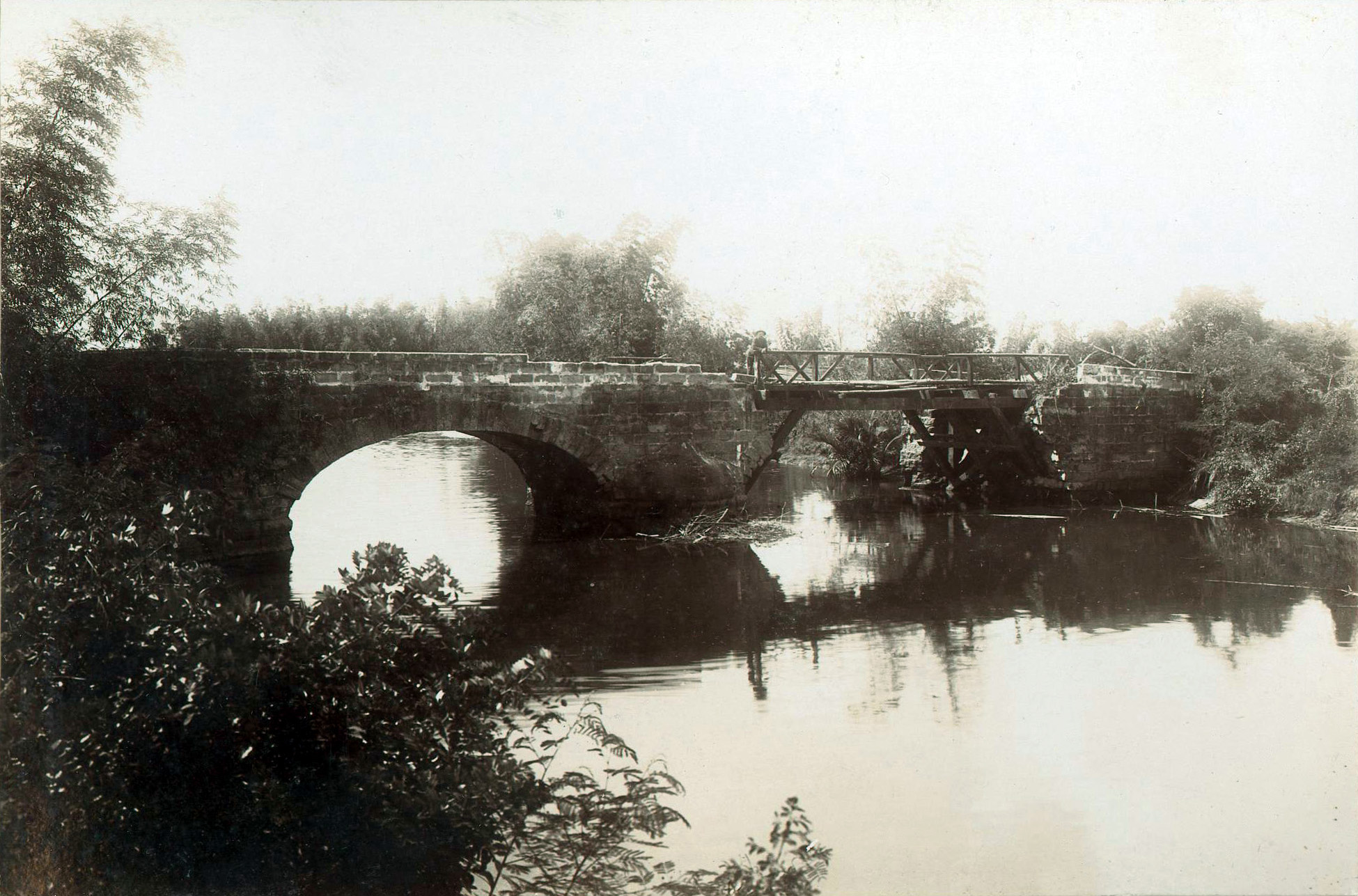
Zapote Bridge in 1899, site of the historic battle in 1897 which killed Gen. Edilberto Evangelista

With the Philippine declaration of independence from Spain on June 12, 1898, hostilities reignited in Cavite and Bacoor was designated as the first capital of Emilio Aguinaldo's revolutionary government until it was transferred to Malolos, Bulacan in August 1898, a month before the convening of the Malolos Congress.

The Zapote Bridge became the site once again of another battle on June 13, 1899, this time between Philippine and American troops. An American force of 1,200 men supported by naval gunfire from the American squadron in Manila Bay crushed a 5,000-strong Filipino force led by General Pío del Pilar. Zapote Bridge's special place in Philippine history is depicted today in Bacoor's city seal.

On October 15, 1903, the Philippine Commission enacted Act No. 947, merging Bacoor and Perez-Dasmariñas with Imus. Bacoor was reconstituted as an independent municipality on October 24, 1906 by virtue of Act No. 1551, thus separating it from Imus.

=== Japanese occupation ===
During World War II, in 1942, Japanese occupation forces entered Bacoor and other towns of Cavite province. From May 7, 1942, to August 15, 1945, many Caviteños joined the Cavite Guerrilla Unit (CGU), a recognized guerrilla group headed by Colonel Mariano Castañeda.

This group would eventually become the Filipino-American Cavite Guerrilla Forces (FACGF). Colonel Francisco Guerrero and the FACGF's 2nd Infantry Regiment was put in charge of Japanese resistance in Bacoor.

The FAGCF, together with Filipino soldiers under the 4th, and 42nd Infantry Division of the Philippine Commonwealth Army liberated Bacoor. The 4th Constabulary Regiment of the Philippine Constabulary defeated the Japanese Imperial Army forces from January 1, to August 15, 1945, during the Allied liberation of the Philippines.

=== Philippine independence ===
In 1972, Bacoor became a center of commemoration for the centennial of the martyrdom of the Gomburza and its beloved parish priest Padre Mariano Gomez. The celebrations were headed by Mayor Pablo Gomez Sarino, a relative of Fr. Gomez, which included the turnover of a historical marker to the town of Bacoor.

On June 21, 1988, Mayor Angelito Miranda was assassinated in front of a hospital in Las Piñas by two gunmen, which the police claimed to be from a notorious drug syndicate.

=== Cityhood ===
During the 1990s and 2000s, Bacoor attempted to achieve cityhood status due to its growing population and tax income, with several cityhood bills filed in Congress in 1997, 2000 and 2007. On July 25, 2011, President Benigno Aquino III signed into law Republic Act No. 10160 creating the City of Bacoor. It was ratified through a plebiscite on June 23, 2012, wherein majority of the town's participated registered voters favored the cityhood.

With the incorporation of Bacoor as a city, it was divided into two legislative districts, Bacoor West and Bacoor East. During the 2013 mid-term elections, the citizens of Bacoor voted for six councilors for each of the two districts.

Bacoor cityhood plebiscite
| Choice | Votes | % |
|---|---|---|
| For | 36,226 | 90.38 |
| Against | 3,854 | 9.62 |
| Total | 40,080 | 100.00 |
Source: News article from Philippine Daily Inquirer

On April 12, 2019, President Rodrigo Duterte signed into law Republic Act No. 11274, amending Section 10(B) of RA No. 10160; as a result, eight barangays had their names P.F. Espiritu corrected to Panapaan, and another, Zapote V, which was inadvertently omitted in the list provided by an earlier law, was included as part of Bacoor West.

=== 2023 plebiscite ===
On March 28, 2023, the city government passed City Ordinance No. 275-2023, signed by mayor Strike Revilla, pursuant to the Local Government Code of 1991. The said ordinance aimed to reduce 49 barangays to 23: 44 to be merged into 18; five others to be renamed as a consequence of the merger. As a result, the number of city's barangays will be reduced from 73 to 47.

On May 17, the Commission on Elections issued Resolution No. 10917 for the conduct of the plebiscite, which was set on July 29.

Barangays involved in the 2023 plebiscite
| Old name | New name |
|---|---|
Barangays to be merged
| Aniban 1, Aniban 3, Aniban 5 | Aniban 1 |
| Aniban 2, Aniban 4 | Aniban 2 |
| Digman, Kaingin | Kaingin Digman |
| Ligas 1, Ligas 2 | Ligas 1 |
| Mabolo 1, Mabolo 2, Mabolo 3 | Mabolo |
| Maliksi 2, Maliksi 3 | Maliksi 2 |
| Mambog 2, Mambog 5 | Mambog 2 |
| Niog 1, Niog 2, Niog 3 | Niog |
| Panapaan 2, Panapaan 3 | Panapaan 2 |
| Panapaan 5, Panapaan 6 | Panapaan 4 |
| Composanto, Daang Bukid, Tabing Dagat (old Poblacion) | Poblacion |
| Real 1, Real 2 | Real |
| Salinas 2, Salinas 3, Salinas 4 | Salinas 2 |
| Alima, Banalo, Sineguelasan | Sinbanali |
| Talaba 1, Talaba 3, Talaba 7 | Talaba 1 |
| Talaba 4, Talaba 5, Talaba 6 | Talaba 3 |
| Zapote 1, Zapote 2 | Zapote 1 |
| Zapote 3, Zapote 4 | Zapote 2 |
Barangays to be renamed
| Ligas 3 | Ligas 2 |
| Panapaan 4 | Panapaan 3 |
| Panapaan 7 | Panapaan 5 |
| Panapaan 8 | Panapaan 6 |
| Zapote 5 | Zapote 3 |
NOTE: Barangays bearing the present name, Panapaan, were mentioned in the ordinance as its former one, P.F. Espiritu.

A plebiscite was held in 223 clustered precincts across 22 voting centers, as well as in the city jail, with more than a hundred thousand registered voters expected to participate. Despite low voter turnout, majority of voters agreed with the ordinance. The plebiscite results were announced after midnight of July 30.

Local officials had argued that once ratified, the merger of 44 barangays will increase their annual income by about 147–197%. COMELEC said that the city's 223 clustered precincts will be decreased for the upcoming nationwide barangay and Sangguniang Kabataan elections in October.

Plebiscite for City Ordinance 275-2023
| Choice | Votes | % |
|---|---|---|
| For | 29,285 | 90.72 |
| Against | 2,994 | 9.28 |
| Required majority | | 50.00 |
| Total | 32,279 | 100.00 |
| Valid votes | 32,279 | 99.69 |
| Invalid/blank votes | 101 | 0.31 |
| Total votes | 32,380 | 100.00 |
| Registered voters/turnout | 114,416 | 28.30 |
Source: (1) (2)

== Geography ==
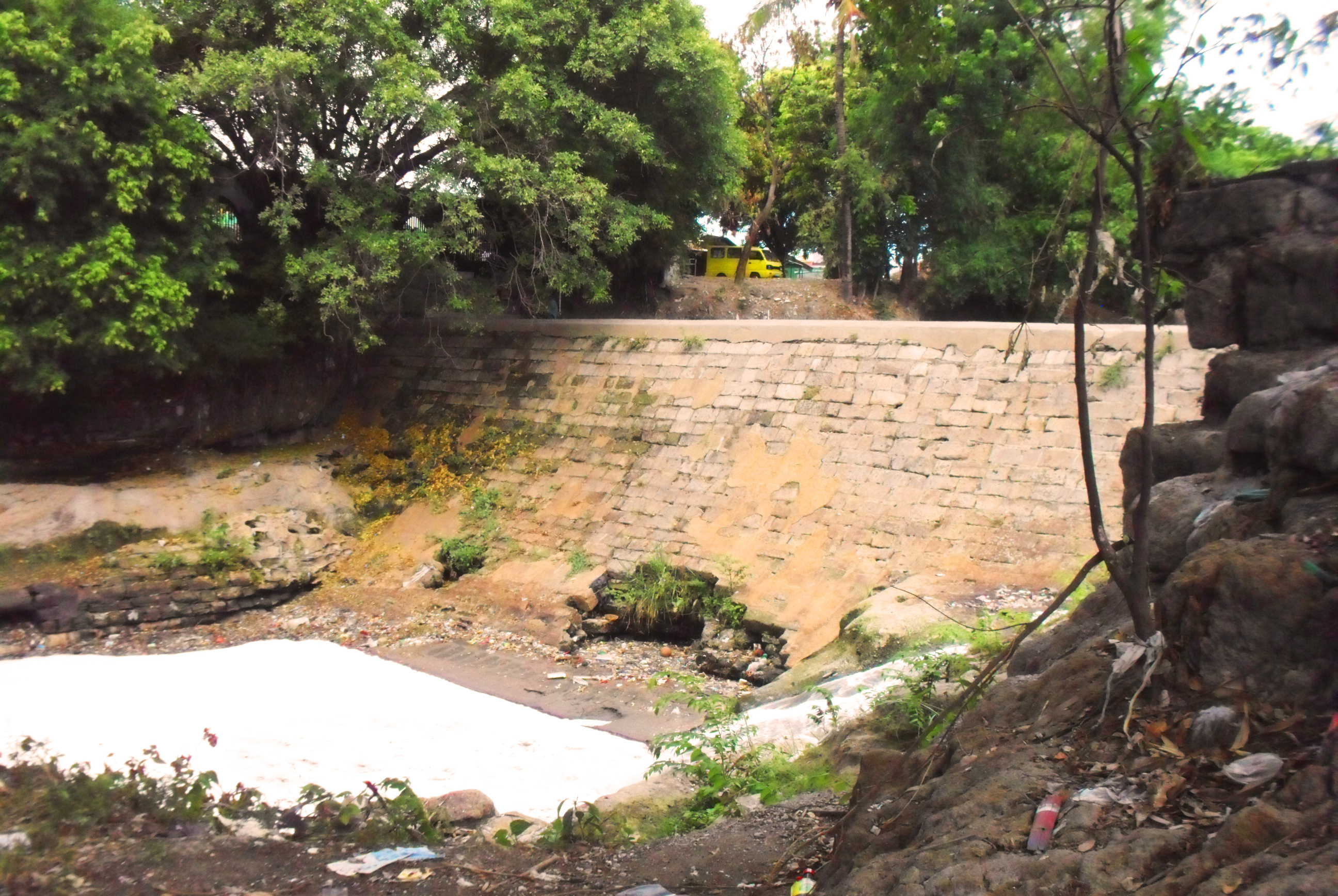
The Molino Dam was built during the Spanish period to divert water for farm irrigation.

=== Physical ===
Bacoor is strategically located at the gateway to Metro Manila. A sub-urban area, the city is located 5 kilometres (3.1 mi) from Imus and 15 kilometres (9.3 mi) southwest of Manila, on the southeastern shore of Manila Bay, at the northwest portion of the province with an area of 52.4 square kilometers.

It is bordered to the east by Las Piñas and Muntinlupa, to the south by Dasmariñas, to the west by Kawit and Imus, and to the north by Bacoor Bay, an inlet of Manila Bay. Bacoor is separated from Las Piñas by the Zapote River and Imus and Kawit by the Bacoor River.

Most of the city comprises flat, formerly agricultural lands, while some areas, such as the coastal barangays of Zapote, Talaba, Niog, and Panapaan, are below sea level. Some barangays, such as Molino and Queens Row, are situated on the hills that form valleys along the upstream portion of the Zapote River.

=== Barangays ===
Bacoor is politically subdivided into 47 barangays. These barangays are grouped into two local electoral districts, officially called Bacoor West and Bacoor East, represented in the city council by their respective councilors. However, the city government has officially abandoned such name designation for the electoral districts and has released edicts officially calling them District 1 and District 2, respectively. Each barangay consists of puroks and some have sitios.

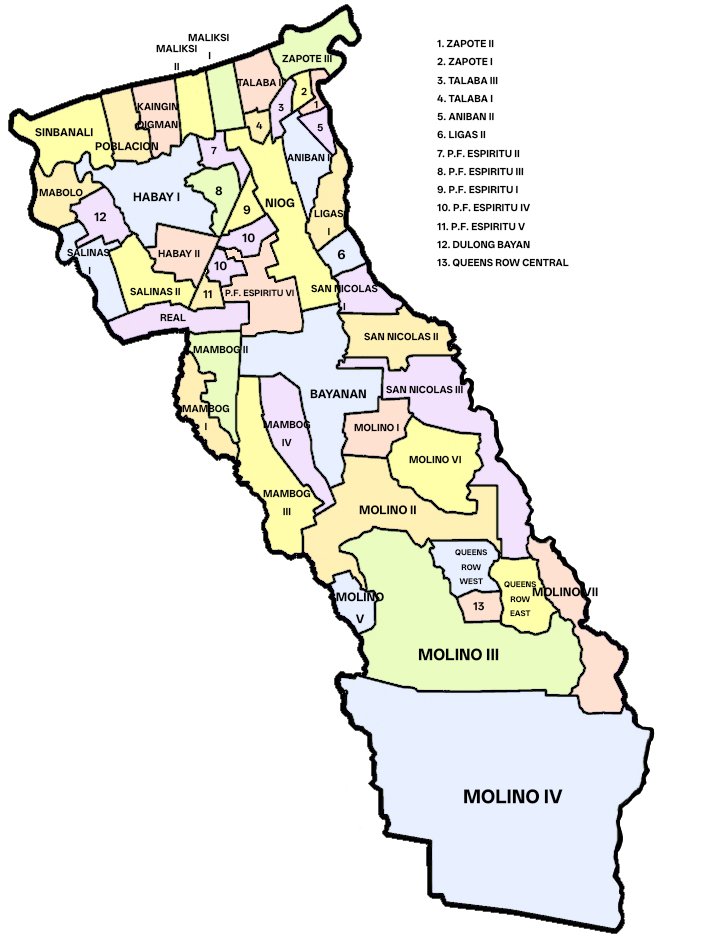
Barangay map of Bacoor after the July 29, 2023 barangay plebiscite

District 1 (Bacoor West)
| Barangay | Population (2024) | | ZIP Code | Notes |
|---|---|---|---|---|
| Aniban 1 | 1.1% | 7,221 | 4102 | Made up from the merger of Barangays Aniban 1, 3, and 5 |
| Aniban 2 | 0.8% | 5,379 | 4102 | Made up from the merger of Barangays Aniban 2 and 4 |
| Dulong Bayan | 0.9% | 5,907 | 4102 | |
| Habay I | 3.1% | 20,541 | 4102 | |
| Habay II | 1.8% | 11,748 | 4102 | |
| Kaingin Digman | 0.7% | 4,322 | 4102 | Made up from the merger of Barangays Kaingin and Digman |
| Ligas 1 | 1.7% | 11,012 | 4102 | Made up from the merger of Barangays Ligas 1 and 2 |
| Ligas 2 | 1.2% | 7,893 | 4102 | Formerly known as Barangay Ligas 3 |
| Mabolo | 0.8% | 5,205 | 4102 | Made up from the merger of Barangays Mabolo I, II, and III |
| Maliksi 1 | 0.7% | 4,525 | 4102 | |
| Maliksi 2 | 1.0% | 6,690 | 4102 | Made up from the merger of Barangays Maliksi 2 and 3 |
| Niog | 2.5% | 16,796 | 4102 | Made up from the merger of Barangays Niog 1, 2, and 3 |
| P.F. Espiritu 1 | 0.7% | 4,430 | 4102 | Formerly known as Panapaan 1 |
| P.F. Espiritu 2 | 1.1% | 7,252 | 4102 | Made up from the merger of Barangays P.F. Espiritu 2 and 3 |
| P.F. Espiritu 3 | 1.8% | 11,954 | 4102 | Formerly known as P.F. Espiritu 4 |
| P.F. Espiritu 4 | 1.3% | 8,515 | 4102 | Made up from the merger of Barangays P.F. Espiritu 5 and 6 |
| P.F. Espiritu 5 | 0.6% | 4,184 | 4102 | Formerly known as P.F. Espiritu 7 |
| P.F. Espiritu 6 | 1.2% | 7,914 | 4102 | Formerly known as P.F. Espiritu 8 |
| Poblacion | 1.0% | 6,364 | 4102 | Made up from the merger of Barangays Camposanto, Daang Bukid, and Tabing Dagat |
| Real | 1.6% | 10,508 | 4102 | Made up from the merger of Barangays Real 1 and 2 |
| Salinas I | 3.0% | 20,015 | 4102 | |
| Salinas 2 | 1.5% | 10,243 | 4102 | Made up from the merger of Barangays Salinas 2, 3, and 4 |
| San Nicolas I | 1.2% | 8,106 | 4102 | |
| San Nicolas II | 1.5% | 9,768 | 4102 | |
| San Nicolas III | 4.7% | 31,008 | 4102 | |
| Sinbanali | 1.1% | 7,023 | 4102 | Made up from the merger of Barangays Sineguelasan, Banalo, and Alima |
| Talaba 1 | 0.8% | 5,577 | 4102 | Made up from the merger of Barangays Talaba 1, 3, and 7 |
| Talaba 2 | 1.9% | 12,334 | 4102 | |
| Talaba 3 | 0.9% | 6,147 | 4102 | Made up from the merger of Barangays Talaba 4, 5, and 6 |
| Zapote 1 | 1.5% | 9,850 | 4102 | Made up from the merger of Barangays Zapote 1 and 2 |
| Zapote 2 | 0.7% | 4,336 | 4102 | Made up from the merger of Barangays Zapote 3 and 4 |
| Zapote 3 | 2.6% | 17,009 | 4102 | Formerly known as Barangay Zapote 5 |
District 2 (Bacoor East)
| Barangay | Population (2024) | | ZIP Code | Notes |
| Bayanan | 1.9% | 12,552 | 4102 | |
| Mambog 1 | 1.9% | 12,501 | 4102 | |
| Mambog 2 | 1.8% | 11,823 | 4102 | Made up from the merger of Barangays Mambog 2 and 5 |
| Mambog 3 | 3.3% | 21,928 | 4102 | |
| Mambog 4 | 2.1% | 14,130 | 4102 | |
| Molino I | 2.9% | 19,199 | 4102 | |
| Molino II | 7.2% | 47,328 | 4102 | |
| Molino III | 10.7% | 70,588 | 4102 | |
| Molino IV | 10.7% | 70,588 | 4102 | |
| Molino V | 1.0% | 6,793 | 4102 | |
| Molino VI | 3.2% | 20,945 | 4102 | |
| Molino VII | 2.1% | 14,203 | 4102 | |
| Queens Row Central | 1.0% | 6,354 | 4102 | |
| Queens Row East | 2.9% | 18,911 | 4102 | |
| Queens Row West | 1.7% | 11,473 | 4102 | |
| Total | | 661,381 | | |

=== Climate ===
Under the Köppen climate classification system, Bacoor features a tropical savanna climate that borders on a tropical monsoon climate (Köppen climate classification Aw/Am). Together with the rest of the Philippines, Bacoor lies entirely within the tropics. Its proximity to the equator means that the temperature range is small, rarely going lower than 20 °C (68 °F) and going higher than 38 °C (100 °F). However, humidity levels are usually very high, which makes it feel much warmer. It has a distinct dry season from late December through April and a relatively lengthy wet season that covers the remaining period. The southwest monsoon, or Habagat, occurs from June to September and can cause flooding in parts of the city.

Climate data for Bacoor
| Month | Jan | Feb | Mar | Apr | May | Jun | Jul | Aug | Sep | Oct | Nov | Dec | Year |
|---|---|---|---|---|---|---|---|---|---|---|---|---|---|
| Mean daily maximum °C (°F) | 30 (86) | 31 (88) | 32 (90) | 34 (93) | 34 (93) | 33 (91) | 32 (90) | 31 (88) | 32 (90) | 32 (90) | 31 (88) | 30 (86) | 32 (89) |
| Mean daily minimum °C (°F) | 24 (75) | 24 (75) | 25 (77) | 27 (81) | 27 (81) | 26 (79) | 26 (79) | 25 (77) | 26 (79) | 26 (79) | 26 (79) | 25 (77) | 26 (78) |
| Average precipitation mm (inches) | 32.9 (1.30) | 31.7 (1.25) | 28.2 (1.11) | 26.9 (1.06) | 188.9 (7.44) | 225.7 (8.89) | 420.0 (16.54) | 377.9 (14.88) | 332.4 (13.09) | 145.1 (5.71) | 128.8 (5.07) | 76.3 (3.00) | 2,014.8 (79.34) |
| Average rainy days | 6 | 6 | 4 | 4 | 12 | 18 | 21 | 23 | 21 | 17 | 14 | 10 | 156 |
Source: World Weather Online

== Demographics ==
Population census of Bacoor
| Year | Pop. | ±% p.a. |
|---|---|---|
| 1903 | 10,925 | — |
| 1918 | 11,090 | +0.10% |
| 1939 | 16,130 | +1.80% |
| 1948 | 20,453 | +2.67% |
| 1960 | 27,267 | +2.42% |
| 1970 | 48,440 | +5.91% |
| 1975 | 62,225 | +5.15% |
| 1980 | 90,364 | +7.74% |
| 1990 | 159,685 | +5.86% |
| 1995 | 250,821 | +8.83% |
| 2000 | 305,699 | +4.33% |
| 2007 | 441,197 | +5.19% |
| 2010 | 520,216 | +6.18% |
| 2015 | 600,609 | +2.77% |
| 2020 | 664,625 | +2.15% |
| 2024 | 661,381 | −0.12% |
Source: Philippine Statistics Authority

In the 2024 census, the population of Bacoor was 661,381 people, with a density of 14,000 inhabitants per square kilometre or 36,000 inhabitants per square mile. It is the second most populous city in the province after Dasmariñas.

The city is a bedroom community of Metro Manila which owes its large population to the influx of low and middle-income settlers who availed of the various housing projects and subdivisions in it.

=== Religion ===
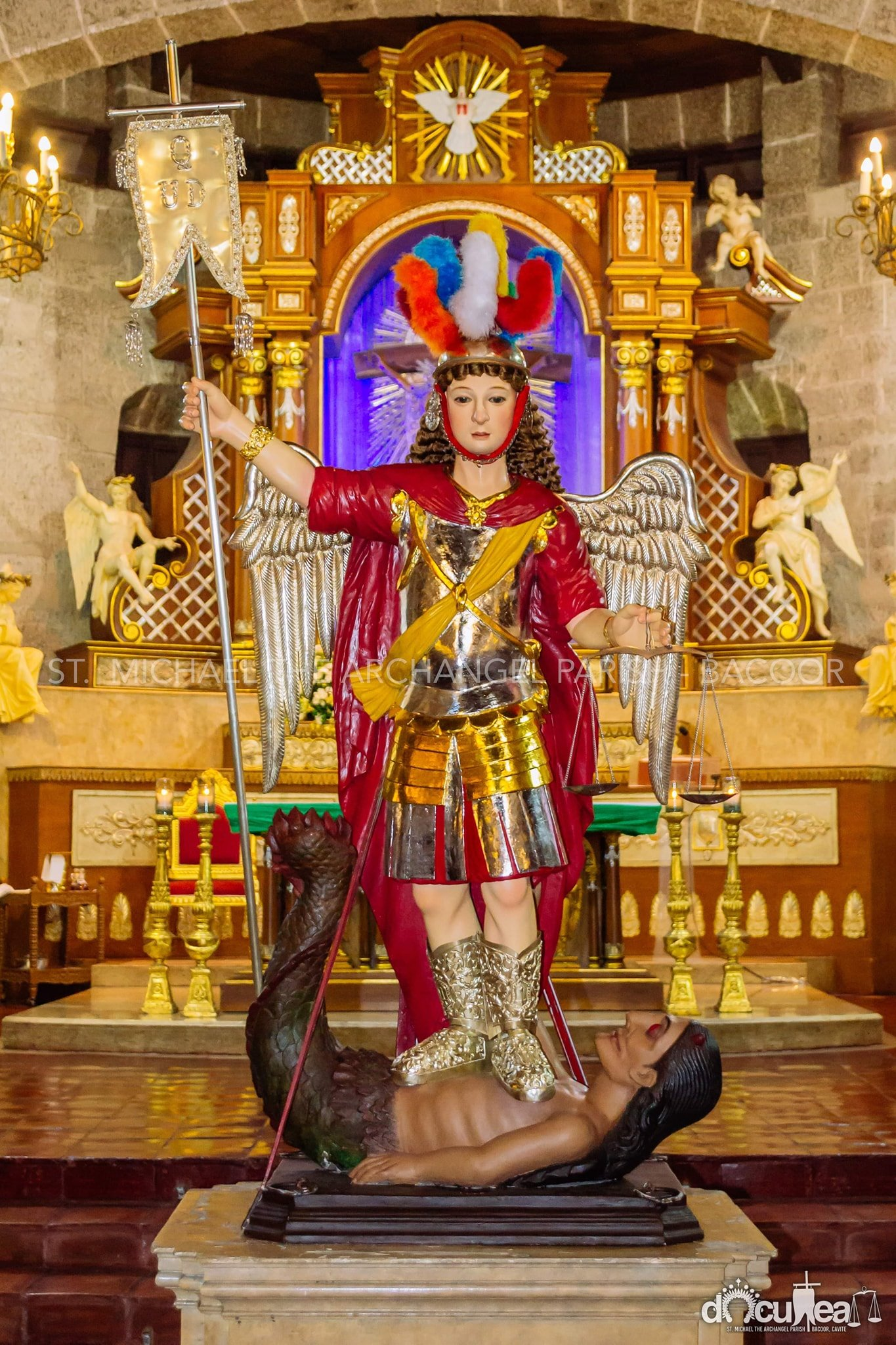
The original centuries-old image of Saint Michael the Archangel, patron saint of Bacoor, Cavite

Roman Catholicism is the dominant religion in Bacoor. It is part of the Diocese of Imus and is the seat of the Vicariate of St. Michael the Archangel and the Vicariate of Santo Niño de Molino. One of Bacoor's notable parish priests was Fr. Mariano Gómez, one of the GOMBURZA trio implicated in the Cavite Mutiny who served as parish priest at the Bacoor parish church from 1824 to his death in 1872. Another notable priest who served the parish of Bacoor was St. Ezekiel Moreno at the time when it was still part of the vast hacienda of the Recollects. He tirelessly provided the Last Rites to the victims of a cholera plague which affected the towns of Bacoor and Imus and was responsible for the rehabilitation of the Molino Dam to irrigate the rice fields of Bacoor and Las Piñas.

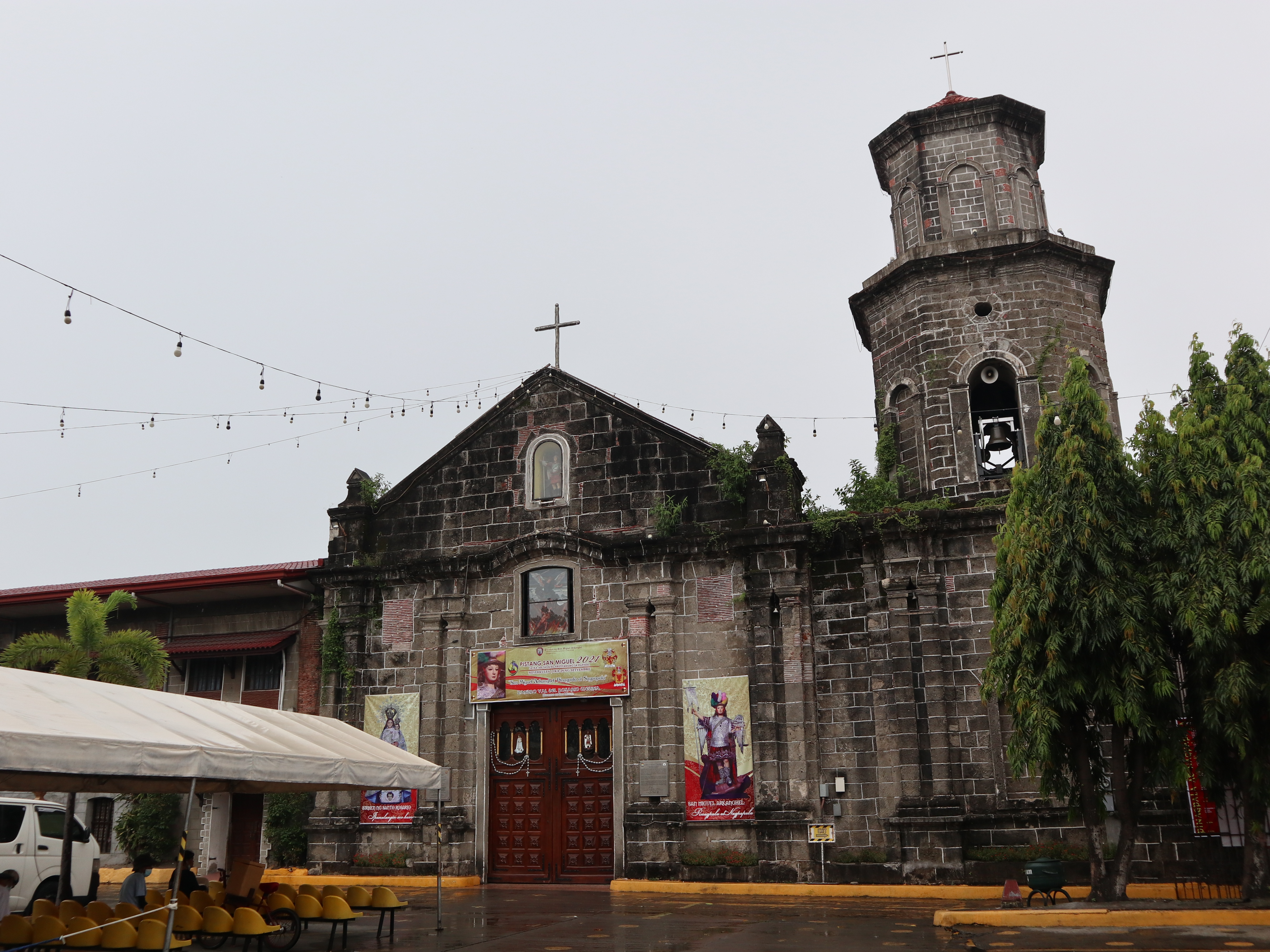
The Roman Catholic Parish of St. Michael the Archangel, founded in 1752

Due to the Philippine Revolution, Bacoor was once again ministered to by secular Filipino priests under the Roman Catholic Archdiocese of Manila. However, during the American occupation in 1902, the Catholic parish priest at that time, Fr. Fortunato Clemeña, became the first Aglipayan priest of Bacoor, as well as the first Aglipayan Bishop of Cavite, during the Aglipayan Schism. Most of the first members of the church in Bacoor were Katipuneros headed by General Mariano Noriel, who is also the first president of the laymen organization. The conversion of Father Clemeña eventually led to the occupation of the old parish church of Bacoor by the Philippine Independent Church, whose occupation ended in 1907 by order of the Philippine Supreme Court ruling in favor of the Catholic Church for illegally-occupied church property. After this recovery, the Roman Catholics exerted efforts in the early 20th century to revive its numbers in the town through the revitalization of its fiesta and the establishment of new traditions. Despite this, and the influx of largely non-Aglipayan migrants from Manila and from other provinces, the presence of the Aglipayan church is still evident in the city. The Aglipayan Diocese of Cavite's Cathedral in Barangay Digman, which is also dedicated to St. Michael the Archangel, is situated a few blocks away from the town's Catholic church. It is the second dominant religion in Bacoor.

Bacoor also has a significant population of Muslims, mostly middle-class Maranao traders and merchants, with a minority of Badjao fishing communities. Several mosques cater to the local Muslim community of Bacoor, the largest being Masjid As-Salaamah, opposite Zapote market. A number of Protestant and other Christian denominations also have a presence in the city.

== Economy ==
Poverty incidence of Bacoor (%)

Source: Philippine Statistics Authority

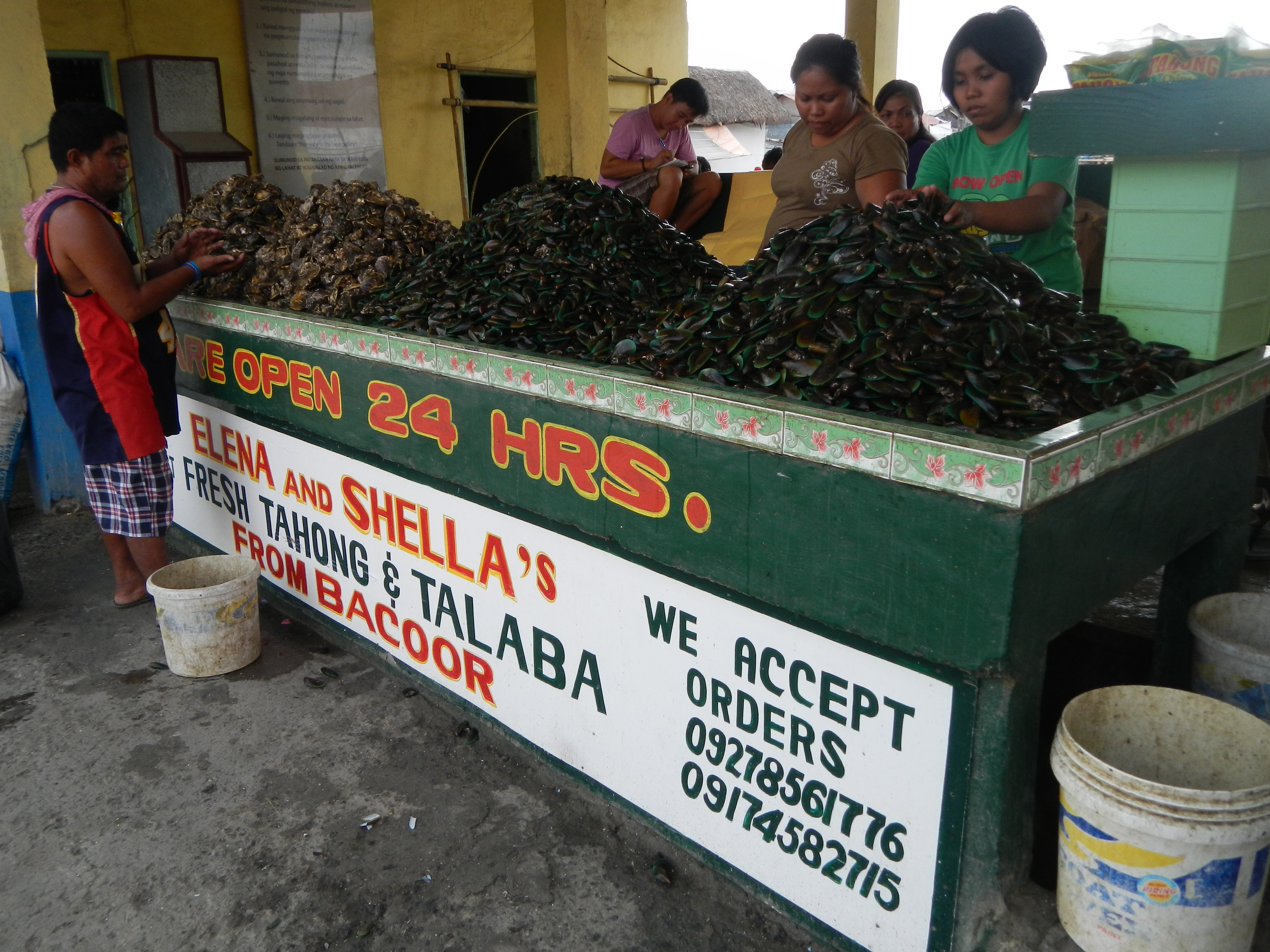
Mussels and oysters are two of Bacoor's main products.

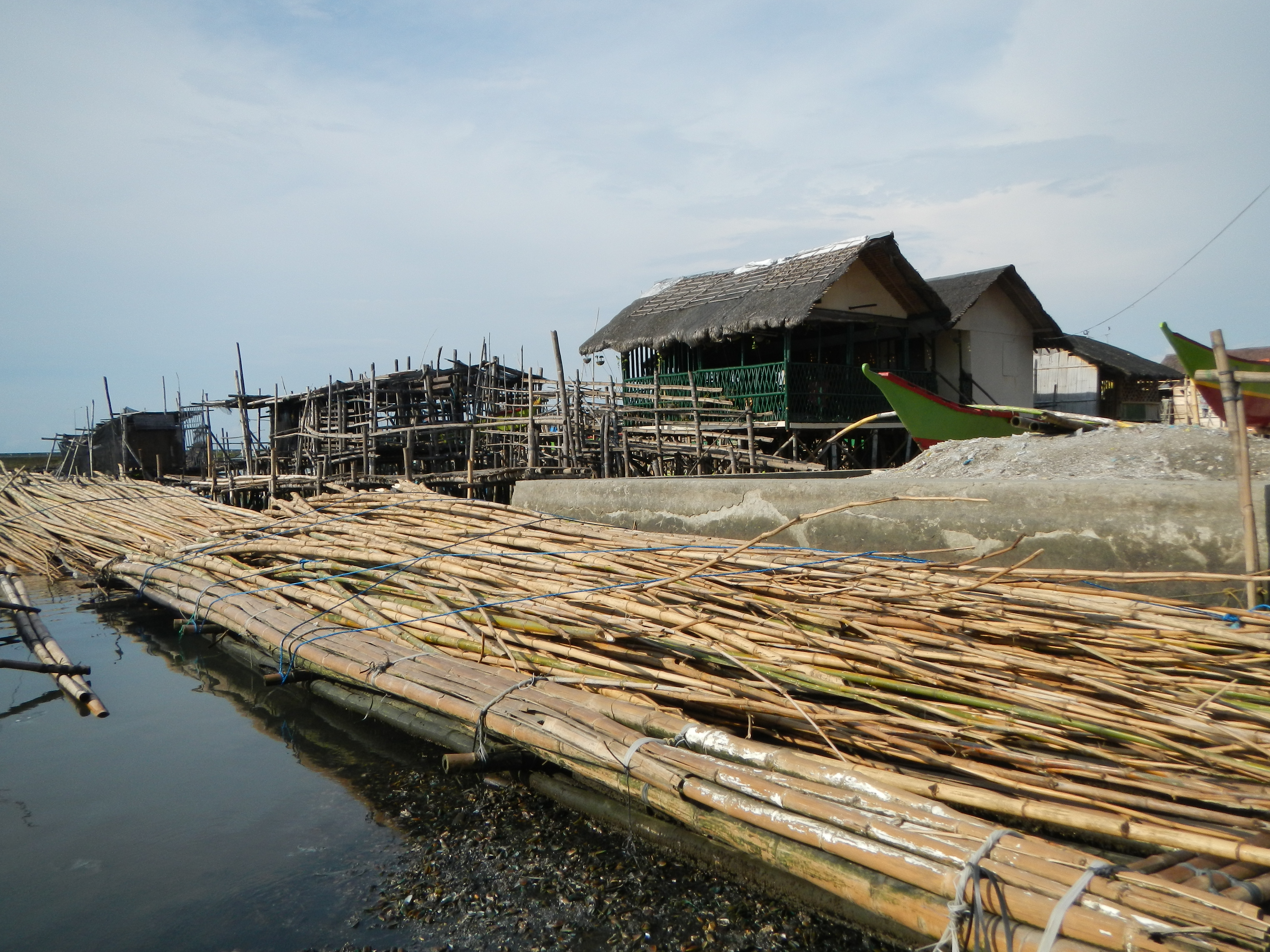
Bamboo is another common product in Bacoor.

=== Commerce ===
Bacoor is currently experiencing a rapid shift from an agriculture-based economy to a residential/commercial urban center. Nowadays, retail, manufacturing, banking and service sectors are Bacoor's primary income earners. Commercial activities are sporadic throughout the city ranging from wholesale to retail establishments, restaurants and eateries, hardware and construction supplies and other service-related industries, especially those located in SM City Bacoor where it serves as the city's main income earner. The mostly residential area of Molino is also home to SM Center Molino at the corner of Molino Road and Daang Hari. The entrance area from the Coastal Road to Aguinaldo Highway in Talaba and the area surrounding the Zapote Public Market (now the Bacoor Public Market) are other commercial centers. Bacoor has branches of 11 different commercial banks all over the city.

Meanwhile, agricultural area has lessened to only 100 hectares while fishponds which likewise decreased to almost half of the original 760 hectares. Salt production, fishing, oyster and mussel culture, which are now being threatened to near extinction because of pollution and overpopulation, are the other sources of income of the residents. These industries are also threatened by the construction of the Cavite Coastal Road Extension which directly affected the Bacoor shoreline.

=== Land use ===
Land use developments in Bacoor include a proposed industrial village in Barangay Niog which will include light cottage industries with supporting residential and commercial facilities. A vast tract of land in Molino area, on the other hand, is envisioned to host residential, institutional and commercial facilities. Dubbed as the New Bacoor, the land use plan in Molino seeks to utilize the area not only as a dormitory for individuals who work in Metro Manila but also for people who have migrated to Bacoor in search of economic advancement.

== Government ==
=== City seal ===
The 3D version of the City Seal

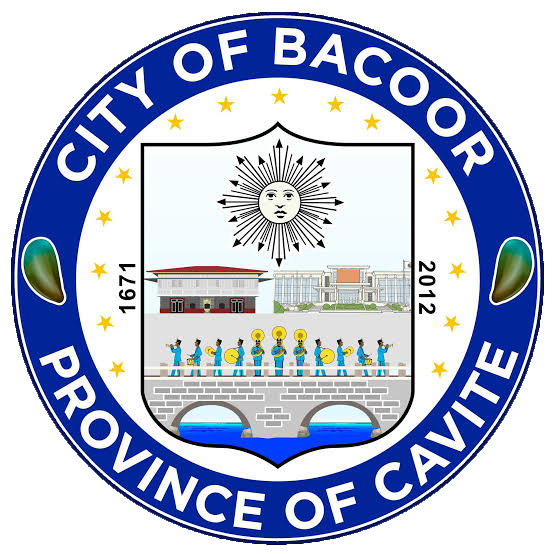
The first version of the new Bacoor City Seal unveiled in March 2026

The current seal of the City of Bacoor was unveiled in March 2026, replacing the first seal adopted in 2012 following the city's conversion from a municipality to a city. The new design retains some elements of the previous design, it now introducing a new and formal layout of symbols relevant to its identity and historical significance. The seal was published by the City Government of Bacoor on March 13, 2026.

The seal is enclosed within a blue circular border bearing the inscriptions “CITY OF BACOOR” along the upper arc and “PROVINCE OF CAVITE” along the lower arc. Both inscriptions are rendered in uppercase, gold-colored lettering in a Times New Roman-style font. Two mussels (tahong) are positioned on either side, separating the inscriptions. They represent the city's two legislative districts, Bacoor West and Bacoor East, while also reflecting its aquaculture and seafood industry.

At the center of the seal is a shield featuring all the seal symbols. The first one is a sun on the upper part which inspired by the seal of the 1898 Philippine Revolutionary Government and the sun on the Philippine flag. Its 16 rays represent the 16 provinces associated with the historical gathering in Bacoor, where 198 town mayors and gobernadorcillos assembled on August 1, 1898, to ratify the Acta de la Independencia, the revised document in recognition of the Declaration of Philippine Independence proclaimed on June 12, 1898.

Beneath the sun are two structures: the Bahay na Tisa, the ancestral house of the Cuenca family, on the left, and the new Bacoor City Hall on the right. The Bahay na Tisa served as a seat of the Philippine Revolutionary Government and was the site where the Acta de la Independencia was ratified on August 1, 1898. The house also symbolizes the city's rich history and the significance of its beginnings. The new city hall represents the local government and the city's urban progress.

Below these structures are 11 marching band figures, representing the first 11 marching bands established in Bacoor before its conversion into a city. They also reflect Bacoor's identity as the “Marching Band Capital of the Philippines.” Beneath the figures is the Zapote Bridge, which symbolizes the Battle of Zapote Bridge, fought during the Philippine Revolution in 1897. The water beneath the bridge represents the Zapote River, while the bridge's 47 brick slabs represent the city's 47 barangays.

Outside the shield, the date 1671 appears on the left side, symbolizing Bacoor's establishment as a pueblo, while the date 2012 appears on the right, side marking its conversion into a city. Surrounding the outside of shield are 15 stars representing the first 15 family surnames associated with the establishment of the pueblo of Bacoor.

Following its unveiling, the seal’s appearance and some of its symbols designs were revised based on public feedback and it was now currently in used (with NHCP approval) while retain the layout and original design purpose.

=== Elected officials ===
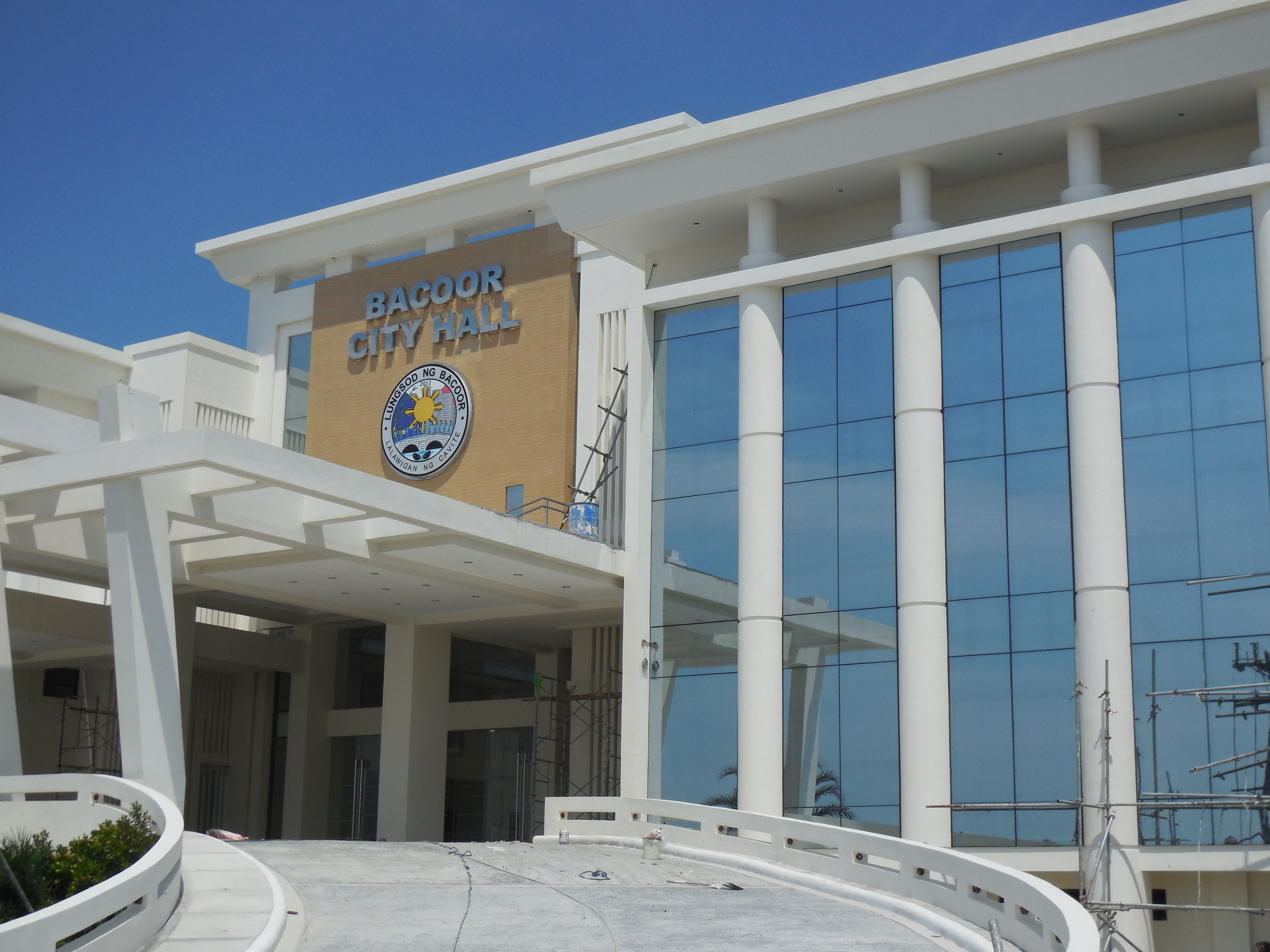
The New Bacoor City Hall at the Bacoor Government Center

City Government of Bacoor (2025–2028)
Representative
Lani Mercado-Revilla
Mayor
Strike Revilla
Vice Mayor
Rowena Bautista-Mendiola
Sangguniang Panlungsod Members
| Bacoor West (District 1) | Bacoor East (District 2) |
| Miguel N. Bautista | Roberto L. Advincula |
| Catherine Sarino-Evaristo | Horacio M. Brillantes Jr. |
| Manolo S. Galvez Jr. | Simplicio G. Dominguez |
| Adrielito G. Gawaran | Reynaldo M. Fabian |
| Levy M. Tela | Rogelio M. Nolasco |
| Ricardo F. Ugalde | Reynaldo D. Palabrica |
President, Liga Ng Mga Barangay/ LNB (formerly ABC)
Randy C. Francisco (Daang Bukid)
President, Sangguniang Kabataan Federation
Palm Buncio (Molino IV)
Provincial Board Members
| Edwin E. Malvar | Alde Joselito Pagulayan |

Pursuant to Chapter II, Title II, Book III of Republic Act No. 7160 or the Local Government Code of 1991, the city government is to be composed of a mayor (alkalde), a vice mayor (bise alkalde) and members (kagawad) of the legislative branch Sangguniang Panlungsod alongside a secretary to the said legislature, all of which are elected to a three-year term and are eligible to run for three consecutive terms.

As with every Philippine city, Bacoor's chief executive is the city mayor. Elected to a term of three years and limited to three consecutive terms, the chief executive appoints the directors of each city department, which include the office of administration, engineering office, information office, legal office, and treasury office. The incumbent mayor of Bacoor is Lani Mercado-Revilla, from the Lakas Party, who first served as the city's lone representative in the Philippine House of Representatives from 2010 to 2016. She is the wife or former Senator Ramon Revilla, Jr.

The city's vice mayor performs duties as acting governor in the absence of the mayor. The vice mayor also automatically succeeds as mayor upon the death of the incumbent. The vice mayor also convenes the Sangguniang Panlungsod, the city's legislative body. The incumbent vice mayor of Bacoor is Catherine Sarino-Evaristo from the Lakas Party. She first assumed office on June 30, 2013, after defeating former vice mayor Rosette Miranda-Fernando. She ran and was elected for a second term in 2016.

=== Legislative ===
The city, which is a lone congressional district, is represented in the Philippine House of Representatives by congressman Strike Revilla from the Lakas Party, brother-in-law of Mayor Lani Mercado-Revilla. He first assumed office as city mayor from 2007 to 2016. Within the city, the City Board or Sangguniang Panlungsod crafts all city ordinances, performs appropriation of city funds, issues franchises and permits, impose fees on city services, and exercise other duties and powers as stipulated by the Local Government Code of 1991. Being a first-class city in terms of income, Bacoor is entitled to a City Board composed of 12 members, six each from the city's two board districts.

== Infrastructure ==
=== Transportation ===
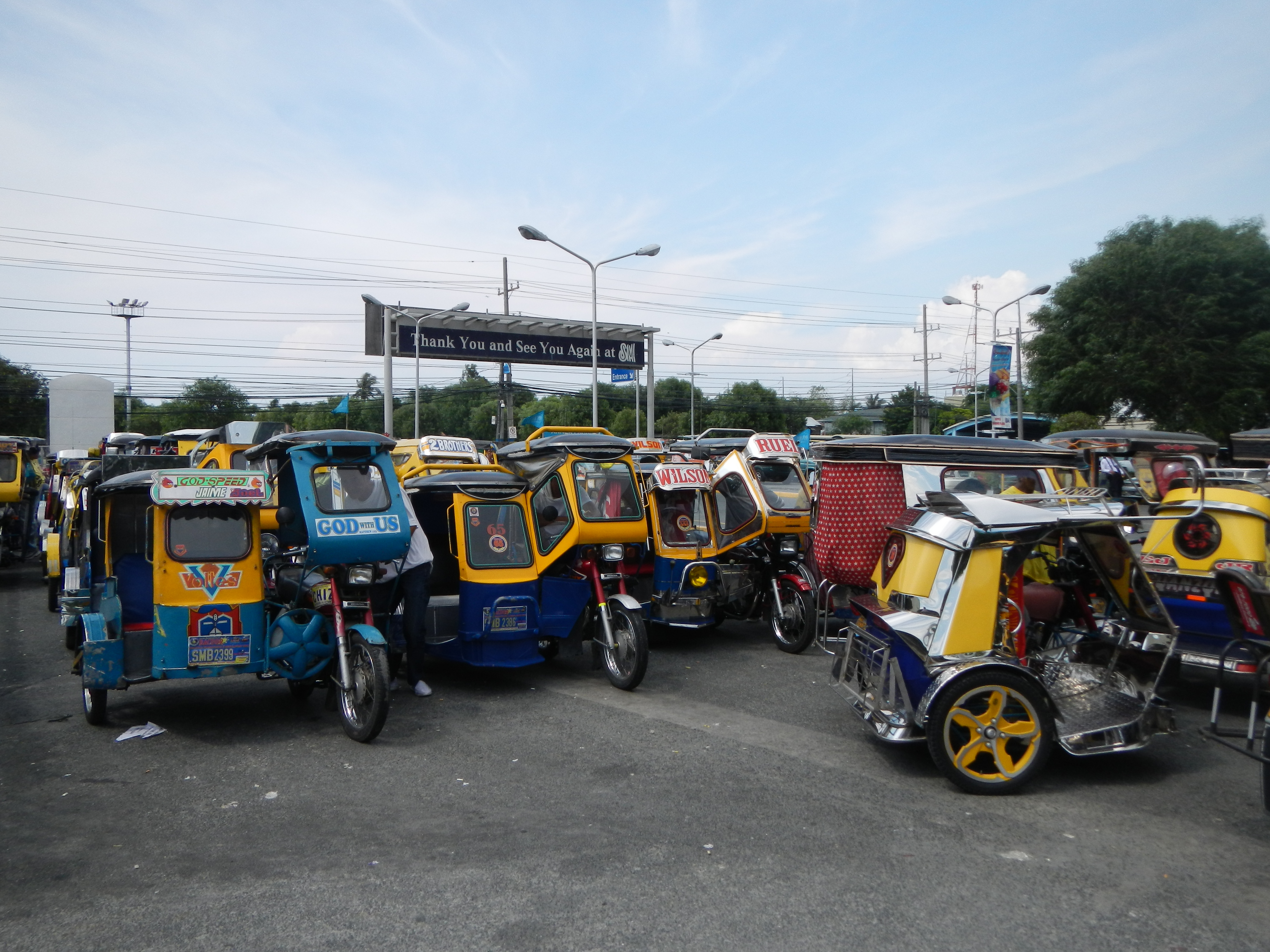
Tricycle terminal in front of SM City Bacoor

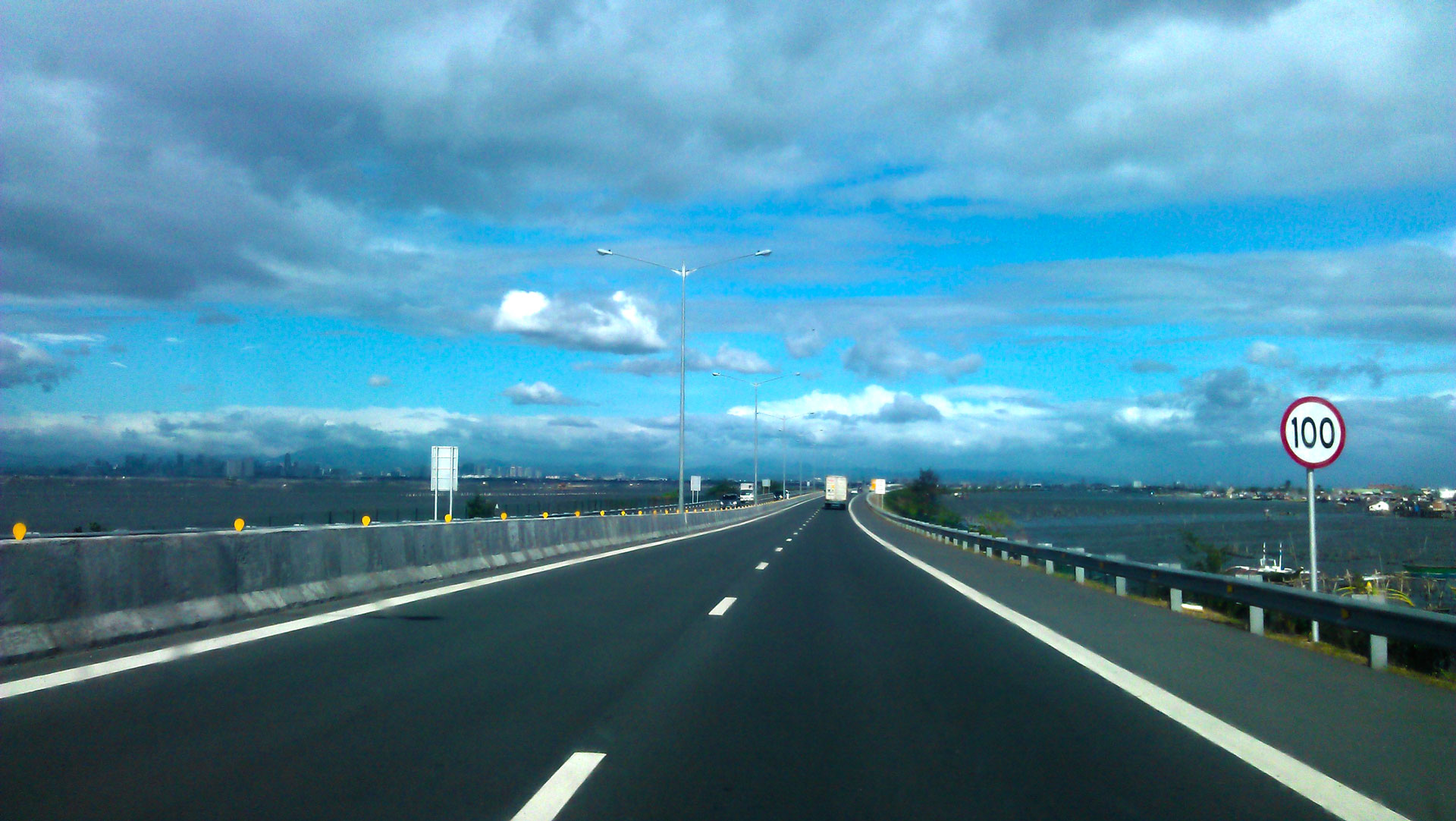
The Bacoor section of the CAVITEX

Bacoor is described as a bedroom community with most of its citizens commuting to and from Metro Manila to work. The city is the connected to Metro Manila by expressways like CAVITEX and Muntinlupa–Cavite Expressway, national roads like Aguinaldo Highway (N62/N419) and Quirino Avenue (N62) in the north, and other major thoroughfares like Daang Hari and Marcos Alvarez Avenue. It is also the terminus of the Aguinaldo Highway and Tirona Highway which connects the city to the rest of Cavite. Common forms of transportation are buses, mini-buses, public utility vans, jeepneys.

Due to the congestion of Bacoor's major thoroughfares and overpopulation, the city suffers from daily heavy traffic. This is expected to be eased in the future with the construction of the Manila Light Rail Transit System's southern terminus in the city. The LRT 1 South Extension project would see the LRT-1 extended from Baclaran in Pasay to Niog in Bacoor. The project's estimated cost is P65 billion.

On September 12, 2014, the Benigno Aquino III administration awarded the contract for the construction of the LRT 1 South Extension project to the Light Rail Manila Consortium, which is composed of Metro Pacific Investments Corporation, AC Infrastructure Holdings Corp. (a subsidiary of Ayala Corporation), Sumitomo Corporation, and Macquarie Infrastructure Holdings (Philippines) Pte. Ltd.

The groundbreaking for the LRT Line 1 South Extension Project was held on Thursday, May 4, 2017, with the actual construction officially commencing on Tuesday, May 7, 2019, after the right-of-way became "free and clear" from obstructions.

As of April 30, 2024, phase 1 is 98.2% complete. Department of Transportation Executive Assistant Jonathan Gesmundo announced the construction of 8 additional stations to the current 20 LRT-1 stations with operations of LRT-1 Cavite Extension Phase 1 are expected by mid-November 2024. Meanwhile, phases 2 and 3 will begin operations by 2031. Once fully operational, Bacoor will be served by the LRT-1 via the future Niog station.

Bacoor is also part of the proposed Cavite–Laguna Expressway (CALAX) which will be funded through debt financing. Metro Pacific Tollways Corp. (MPTC), which will undertake the construction of CALAX, has announced it will borrow P30 billion for the project. MPTC president Rodrigo Franco "said the firm will partner with local banks for debt financing by earlier next year."

=== Health ===
To address the health concerns of the city's ageing population and urban poor population, several public and private hospitals have been established in the city. The local government also initiated a discount program for senior citizens in city wherein they can avail of discounted medical care and medicines in hospitals in and outside of Bacoor.

Along with a number of small private clinics, Bacoor has one major public hospital and seven major private hospitals:

- Southern Tagalog Regional Hospital
- Bacoor Doctors Medical Center
- Cavite East Asian Medical Center
- Crisostomo General Hospital
- Metro South Medical Center
- Molino Doctors Hospital
- St. Dominic Medical Center
- St. Michael Medical Hospital

=== Public safety ===
The Bacoor Traffic Management Department (BTMD) and the Bacoor Public Safety Unit are the main agencies tasked for maintaining peace and order in the city. The Bacoor Police Station, a component of the Cavite Police Provincial Office under the Philippine National Police, assists them in this regard. Given the status of the BTMD as the highest office in the local bureaucracy (with the status of a department), it has been entrusted by the city government to oversee ordinance implementation city-wide with the PNP playing second fiddle.

== Education ==
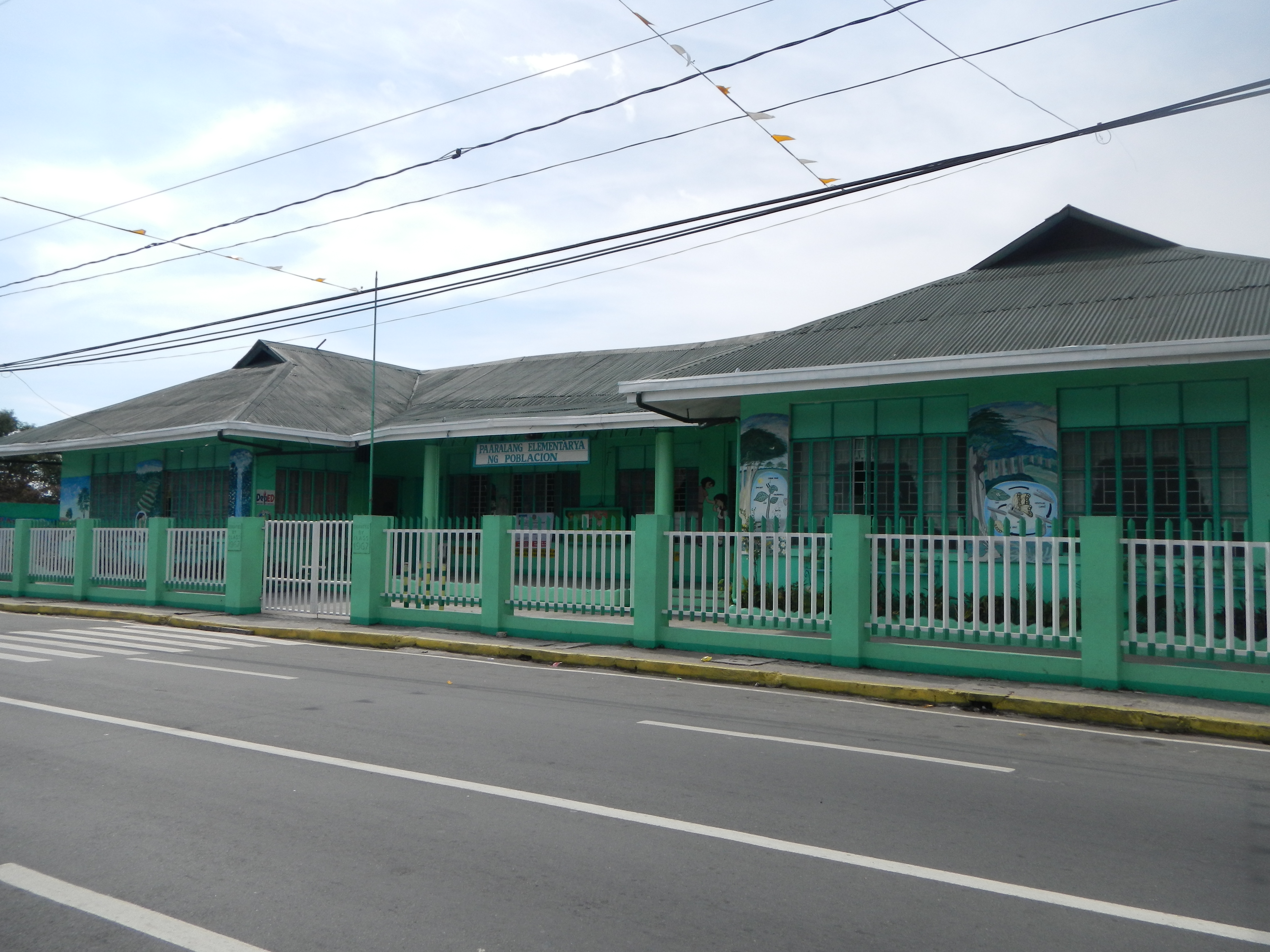
A public elementary school in Bacoor

As a bedroom community, Bacoor is home to public and private education institutions. There are 27 public elementary schools and seven public high schools throughout the city. Students in the public school sector study under the K–12 curriculum. There are numerous privately run elementary schools and high schools. Several private colleges offer academic as well as technical-vocational education. The education in the city is managed by its City Schools Division of Bacoor.

The city is home to two universities: University of Perpetual Help System DALTA and two campuses of the Cavite State University.

== Notable personalities ==
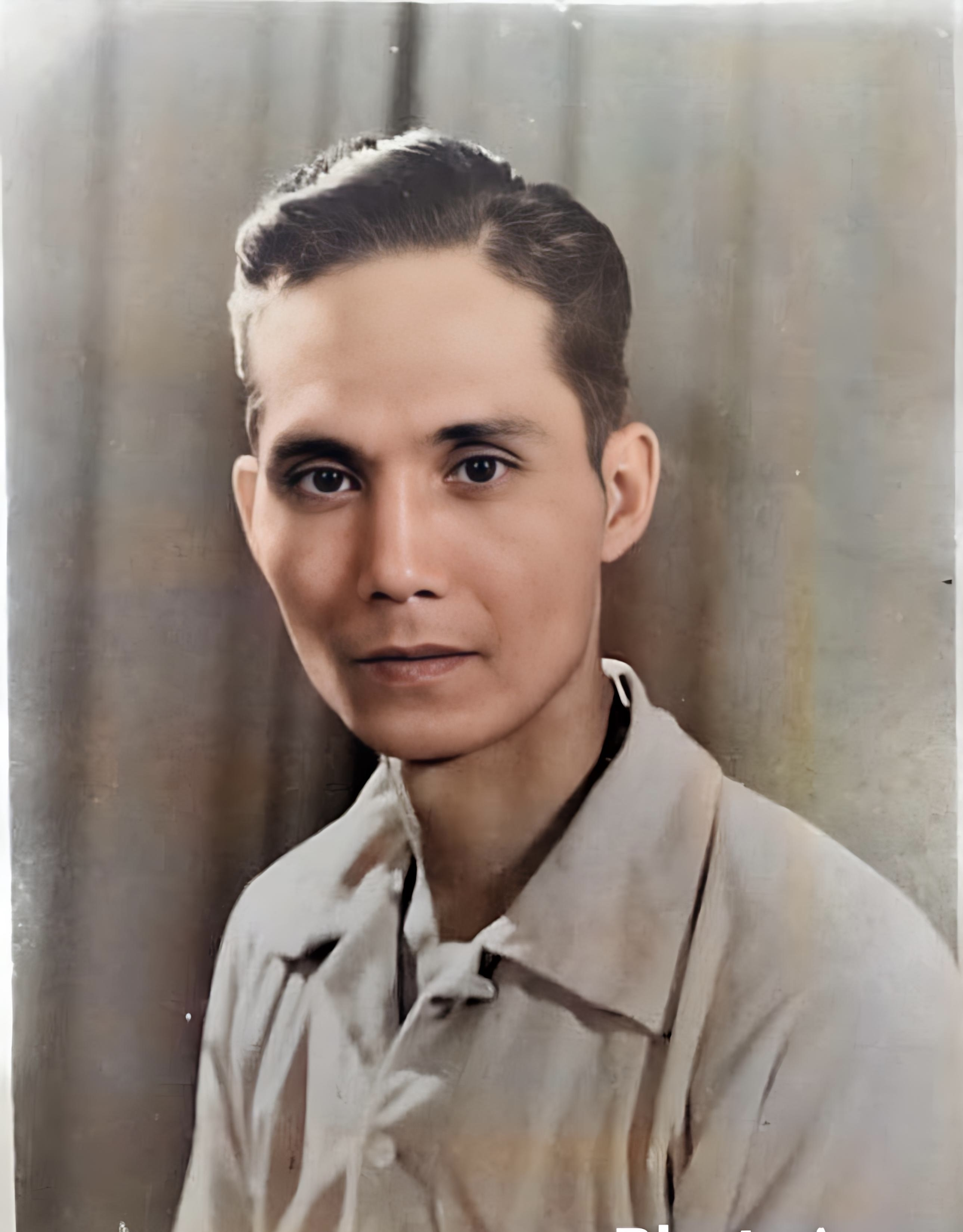
Mayor Pablo Gomez Sarino of Bacoor (1911-1987)

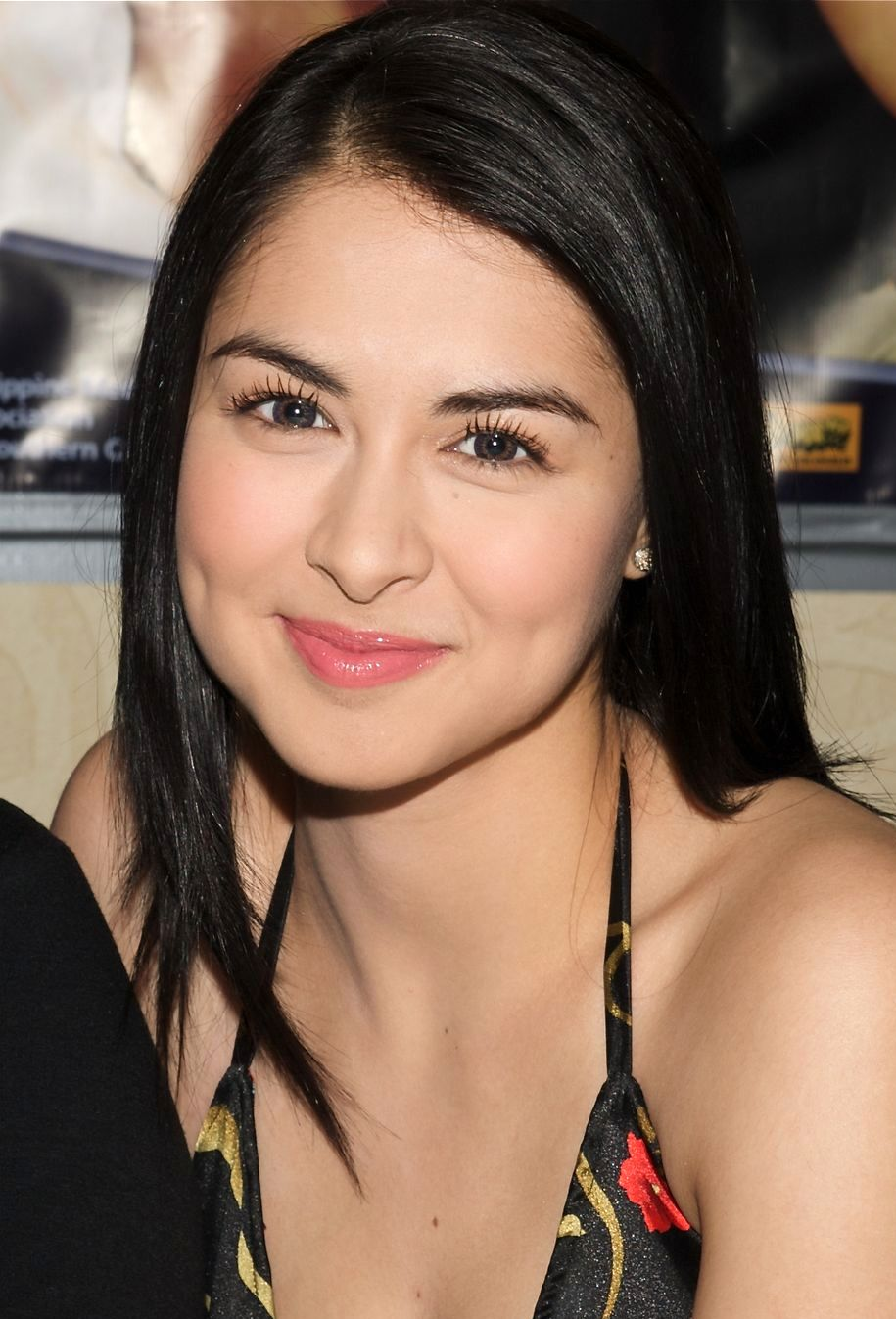
Actress Marian Rivera is a native of Bacoor.

- Christian Bables, award-winning Filipino actor; won Best Supporting Actor at the Gawad Urian Awards for his role as Barbs in the movie Die Beautiful
- Joy Barcoma, beauty queen and titleholder of Miss Philippines Earth 2025
- Ernie Baron, weather forecaster and host of Knowledge Power on ABS-CBN; also known as "The Walking Encyclopedia"
- John Philip Bughaw, also known as "Balang", a child dancer and actor who performed on The Ellen DeGeneres Show
- Joseph Eric Buhain, swimmer, chairman of the Games and Amusement Board of the Philippines
- Serafin Cuevas, lawyer, former associate justice of the Supreme Court of the Philippines (1984–1986) and secretary of justice (1998–2000)
- Francine Diaz, Filipina actress and model
- Rubylita Garcia, murdered journalist for the newspapers Remate and The Pilipino Times
- Leon Guinto, mayor of the City of Manila during the Japanese occupation
- Mariano Noriel, served as general under Emilio Aguinaldo's revolutionary army during the 1896 Philippine Revolution
- Diether Ocampo, actor, singer, and model
- Rey D. Pagtakhan, Canadian physician, professor and politician. He was a cabinet minister in the governments of Jean Chrétien and Paul Martin, and served as a member of parliament from 1988 until his defeat in the 2004 election
- Onyok Pineda, Filipino child actor best known for his role as Onyok in the television series FPJ's Ang Probinsyano
- Marian Rivera, commercial model, actress, and TV host; wife of actor Dingdong Dantes
- Julio Sadorra, Filipino chess grandmaster
- Arra San Agustin, Filipina television actress and model
- Pablo Gomez Sarino, former and longest serving municipal mayor of Bacoor (1959-1963, 1967-1986)
- Wesley So, eighth youngest chess grandmaster in history, peaked at No. 2 in the world
- Jesus Crispin Remulla, 60th secretary-general of justice
- Strike Revilla, Filipino businessperson and politician
- Cong Velasquez, vlogger
- Luis Yangco, Filipino-Chinese entrepreneur and shipping magnate, known as the "King of Manila Bay and Pasig River" for his control of the shipping industry in the two bodies of water. He was also a financier of the La Liga Filipina, the Katipunan, and the Aguinaldo Revolutionary Government.

== Sister cities ==
Local

- Manila
- Davao City

== Gallery ==
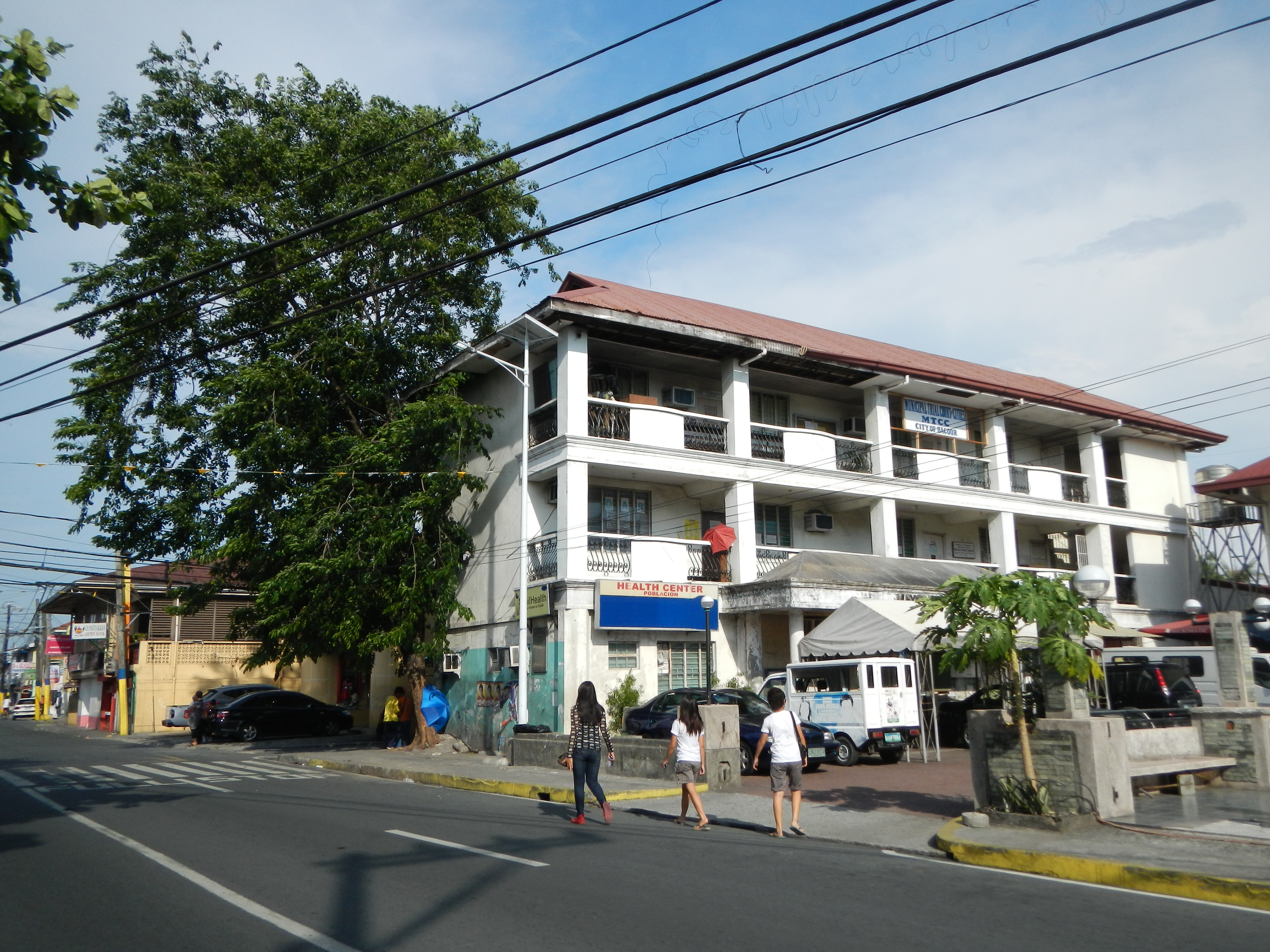
Downtown Bacoor, known as Poblacion

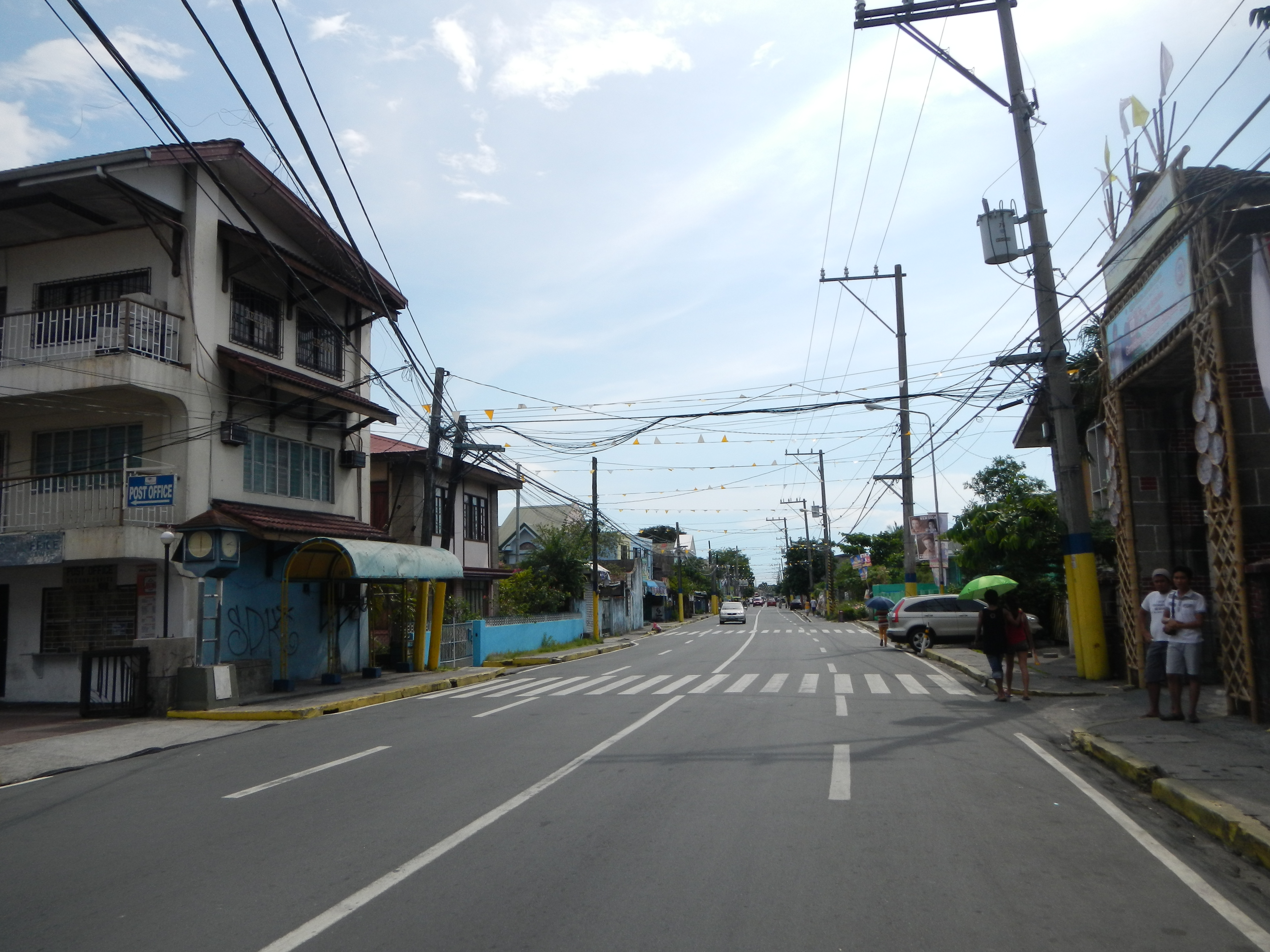
Gen. Edilberto Evangelista Avenue

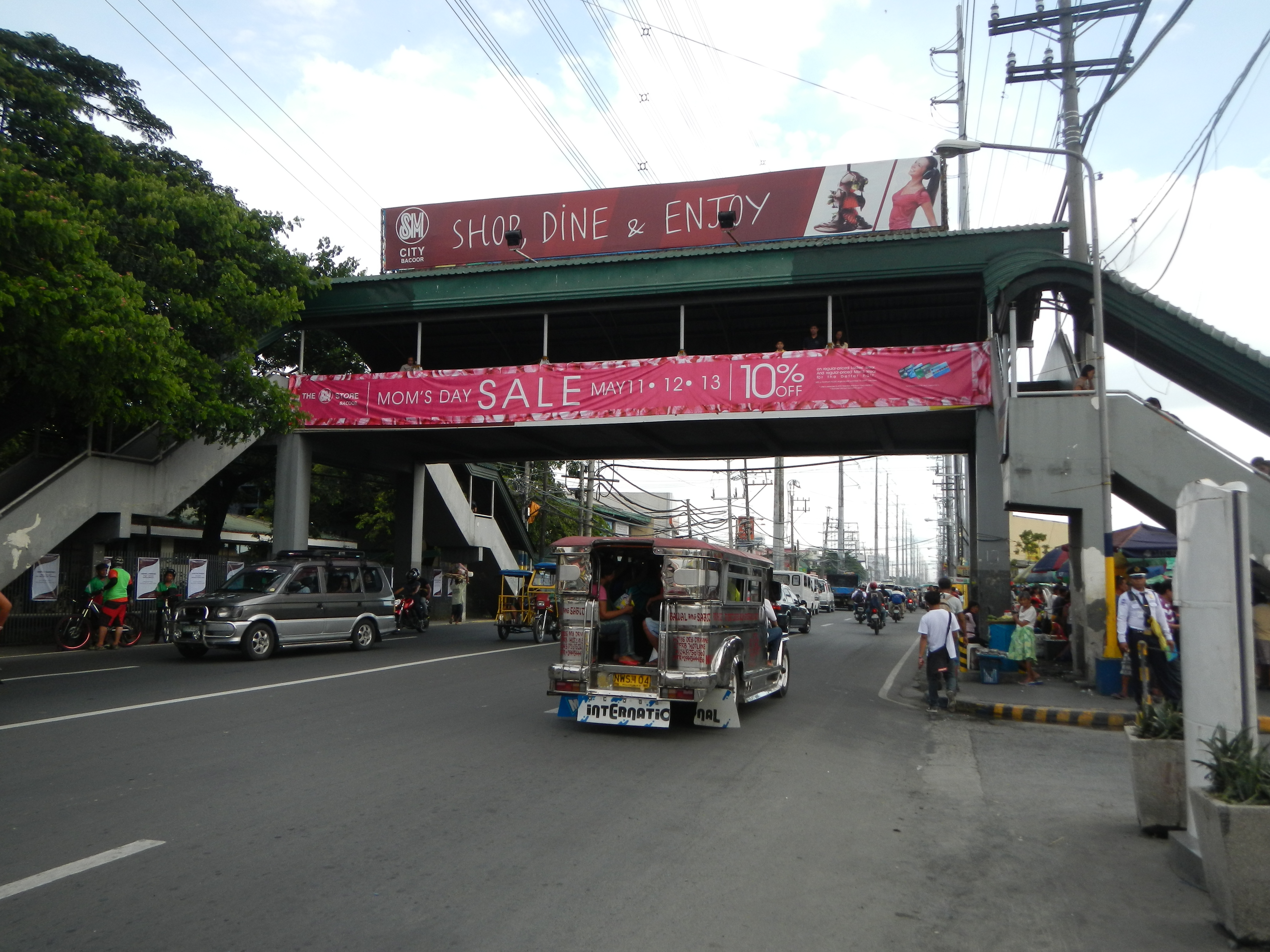
Aguinaldo Highway

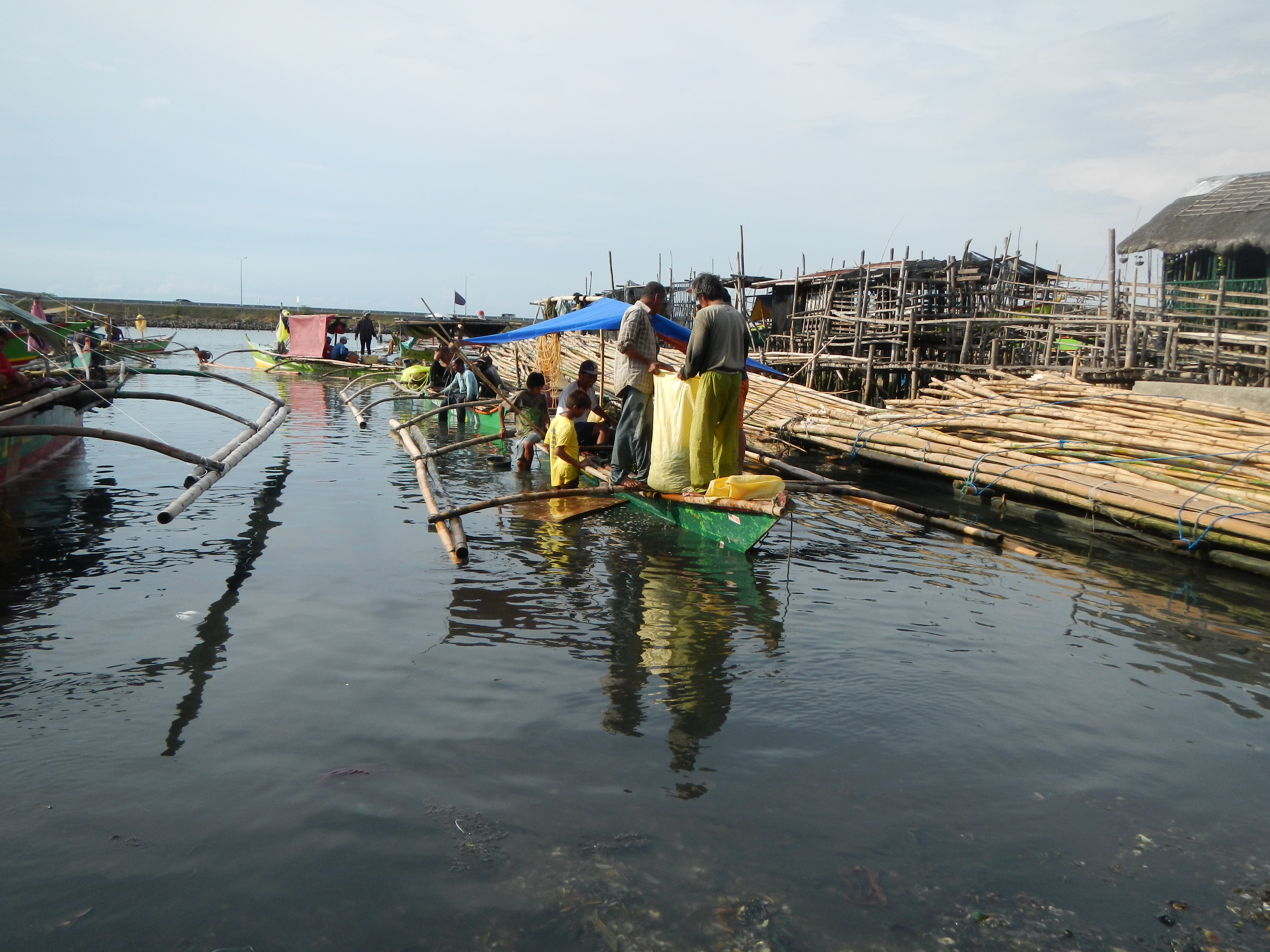
Fishing boat in Bacoor Bay

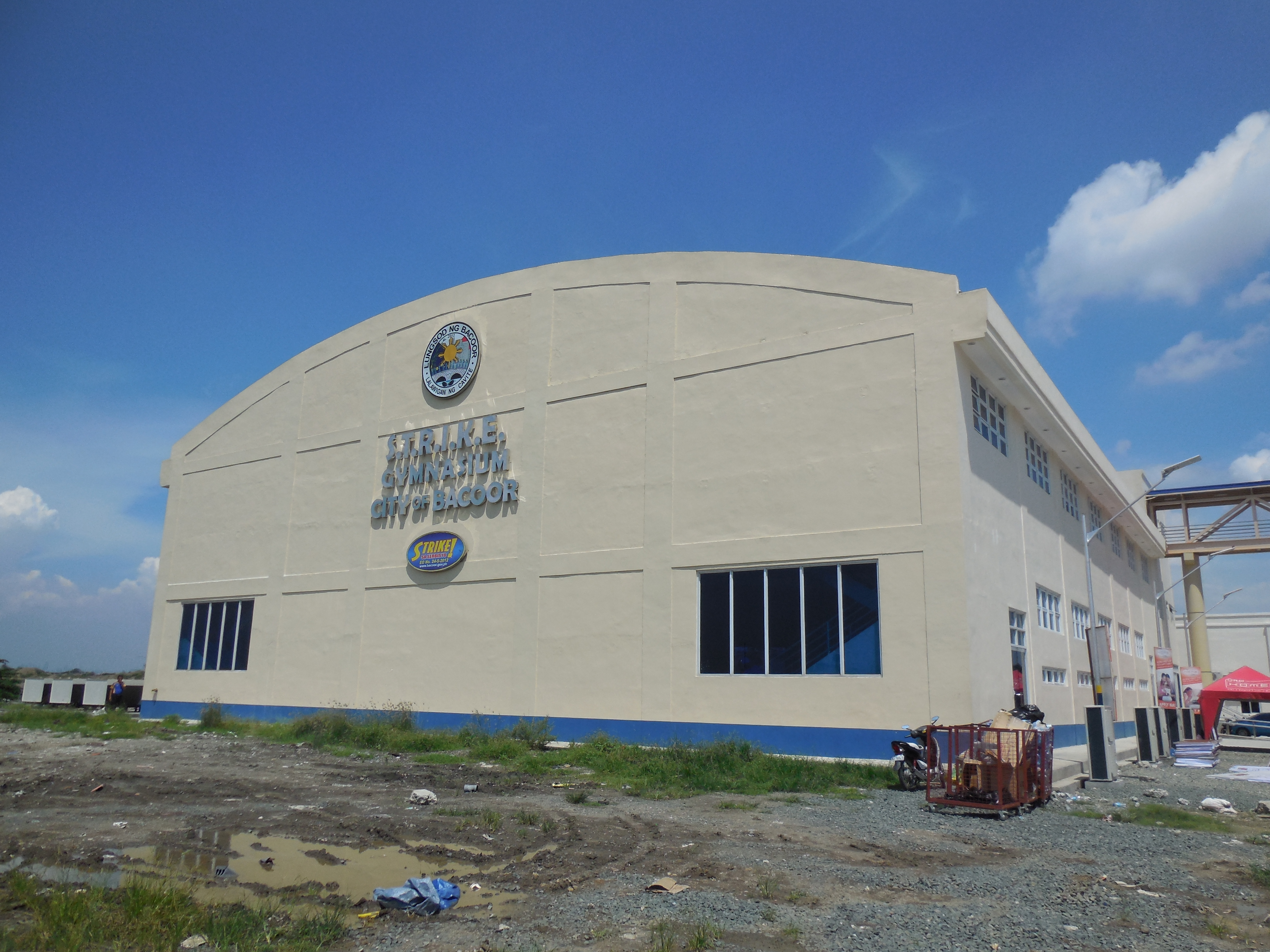
S.T.R.I.K.E. Gymnasium (Bacoor Sports Gymnasium)

SM City Bacoor

== Notes ==
| Preceded by Cavite El Viejo | Capital of the Philippines; July–September 1898 | Succeeded by Malolos |
