= Bacoor Bay =

- Location in the Philippines Bacoor Bay (Luzon) Bacoor Bay (Metro Manila)
- Location: Cavite, Philippines
- Coordinates: 14°28′6″N 120°54′25″E
- Type: Bay
- Part of: Manila Bay
- Settlements: Bacoor; Cavite City; Kawit

Bacoor Bay is a large inlet of southeastern Manila Bay, situated within the province of Cavite in the Philippines.

== Geography ==
Bacoor Bay lies along the shoreline of the southeastern Cavite Peninsula.

Cavite City and Bacoor are located along its shore. The Governor Samonte Park View Promenade is a park along its northern shore in Cavite City.

The bay serves as the inner anchorage of Cavite Naval Base. Cañacao Bay is northeast of the base and the eastern Cavite City peninsula and north of Bacoor Bay.
