= Bill Cable =

American model and actor (1946–1998)

- Born: William Laurence Cumpanas; May 2, 1946; Gary, Indiana, U.S.
- Died: March 7, 1998 (aged 51); Los Angeles, California, U.S.
- Other name: 'Stoner'
- Occupations: Model; Actor; Stuntman
- Years active: 1970–1996

Bill Cable (born William Laurence Cumpanas; May 2, 1946 – March 7, 1998) was an American model, actor, stunt performer and screenwriter. Beginning in 1970, he modeled under the alias Stoner for COLT Studio, where he was photographed by Jim French. His image appeared in numerous publications, including Playgirl, and on the premiere April 1975 cover of Mandate, photographed by French.

Cable appeared in both gay and straight erotic films and later took supporting roles in mainstream productions. His credits included Pee-wee's Big Adventure (1985), Elvira: Mistress of the Dark (1988), and Basic Instinct (1992), in which he played murder victim Johnny Boz. He also pursued screenwriting and wrote several scripts.

== Early life ==
Born William Laurence Cumpanas in Gary, Indiana, he was the grandchild of Katherine Pezo and Thomas Ante. His grandfather was a Croatian immigrant, originally from the village of Klenovac in Dalmatia, who moved to the United States in 1914. He became a member of the former Hrvatski Sinovi CFU Lodge 396 and would eventually serve as the lodge's president. After Cable's grandfather died in 1950, his family moved to Southern California.

Cable was a standout football player for North Hollywood High School as an offensive tackle, and became a varsity captain in his senior year. He continued playing football after enrolling at the University of Nevada, but eventually stopped after a serious head injury. His other hobbies included motorcycles and guns.

Cassandra Peterson later recalled that Cable told her that, after a brief stint at a police academy, he had been “kicked out for dating a stripper.”

== Career ==
=== Model ===
From 1970, Cable was a model for COLT Studio Group, a producer of gay male erotica and pornography, where he was photographed by Jim French. He was also photographed by Bob Mizer for the Athletic Model Guild. During this time, he used the alias “Stoner”.

Cable later posed for the book More Nudes, photographed by Kenn Duncan, whose collection was donated to the New York Public Library by Kenn Duncan's brother and sister in 2003. He was also photographed by Tommy Marshall, Ray Allen, Robert Scott Hooper, Dave Sands, Jeff Dunas and for Playgirl by David Meyer, Raul Vega and Mr. Blackwell. He also appeared in straight softcore pictorials, published in Hollywood Hotline, Star Nudes, and Hollywood Rated X in the 1970s.

Photos of him have been published in many magazines and catalogues, such as: Vanity Fair, Playgirl, Playboy, Oui, Ah Men catalog, That Look! catalog, Frederick's of Hollywood catalog, QQ Magazine, After Dark, California Scene, Honcho, The Best of Gallery, Manpower!, David, In Touch, Blueboy, Barfly, Groovy Guy, Vector, Celebrity Sleuth, H.E.L.P. Drummer, Drummer, Body, Q International, Entertainment West, Hit & Fun, Scream Queens, Playgirl Advisor, Torso, Olympus (first edition in January 1972) and Mandate (first edition in April 1975).

=== Actor ===
Through his associations with the gay erotica scene, Cable found work in both straight and gay erotic films (both softcore and hardcore), as well as a stunt performer and body double in mainstream productions.

His first appearance as a whip-wielding leatherman in Bijou (1972), was directed by Wakefield Poole. Cable starred in the short erotic gay film Cooling It in 1973. Though he appeared in several hardcore films, Cable rarely, if ever, performed in the unsimulated sex scenes, which were performed by body doubles (including John Holmes) via insert shots.

Cable made a handful of mainstream acting appearances, including in Pee-wee's Big Adventure (1985) and Elvira: Mistress of the Dark (1988). His best-known role was as rock star Johnny Boz in the Paul Verhoeven erotic thriller Basic Instinct (1992), where he is memorably murdered in the opening scene, mid-coitus, with an ice pick.

He worked on Elvira's Movie Macabre in 1984 (Episode: Frankenstein's Castle of Freaks). Cable also appeared in the films Pee-wee's Big Adventure, Elvira, Mistress of the Dark, La Posta in Gioco, The Deadly Cure and in 4 films with director Carlos Tobalina: The Last Tango in Acapulco, Jungle Blue, Flesh and Bullets and What's Love.

Cable also had ambitions as a screenwriter. Njos wrote that “Billy’s true passion was writing movie scripts,” adding that he wrote several.

== Personal life ==
Jim French recalled that Cable was working as a tree trimmer when French first photographed him in 1970. In a 2024 Esquire oral history, Peterson recalled that Cable's main occupation was working for a tree-trimming company with his friend Christian Brando. He was in a relationship with Cassandra Peterson, better known as Elvira, in the mid-'70s. He married Shirley Cumpanas in Nevada in 1985 Shortly after their divorce in 1988, she had an affair with Christian Brando, son of actor Marlon Brando, according to an interview and essay with Shirley to Penthouse magazine. He and Cable rekindled their friendship in early 1996. In the mid-'80s, Cable and Brando were both interviewed by Skip E. Lowe on the Skip E. Lowe Globe.

His former wife, Shirley Ann Njos, recalled that Cable “went out of his way to make others comfortable around him. Unfortunately, most people judged him by his appearance, automatically thinking he must be conceited. And yet, he was one of the kindest souls I have ever known.”

== Health issues and death ==
In October 1996, Cable was involved in a motorcycle accident in Laurel Canyon in which he sustained a fractured vertebra in his neck, leaving him paralyzed from the chest down. Cable died on March 7, 1998, seventeen months after the accident, at the age of 51. His funeral was attended by his former co-stars Cassandra Peterson and Paul Reubens. Cable was cremated. The William Laurence Cumpanas Fund was established after his death, supporting the Croatian Fraternal Union Lodge 170 in Merrillville, Indiana.

== Legacy ==
Jim French, who photographed Cable under the name Stoner for COLT Studio, later described him as "probably the most beautiful face I ever photographed." Reflecting on Cable's paralysis and death, French wrote, "Somehow there is an extra poignancy to that sort of thing happening to someone so physically beautiful." His former wife, Shirley Ann Njos, similarly remembered Cable as "the most beautiful man I had ever seen," describing him as "gentle, kind and down to earth."

Wakefield Poole, who directed Cable in Bijou, recalled Cable's awareness of his appeal: "Cable was a tease at heart and knew exactly what he was doing. He enjoyed making himself desirable to everyone—men and women." Cassandra Peterson similarly told writer Matthew Rettenmund in a 2024 Esquire oral history that Cable "loved modeling, being the center of attention, and flirting with gay men, even though he was straight." Rettenmund also identified a Jim French photograph of Cable, under his Stoner alias, as the cover image of the premiere April 1975 issue of Mandate.

== Filmography ==
Year	Title	Role	Notes
1971		Bill Cable	Untitled making of, posing nude with a motorcycle for Bob Mizer
1972	Bijou	Bearded man with whip	Using the pseudonym Cable
1973	Cooling It	Stoner	Using the pseudonym Stoner. Reissued in the collection Sex Rated Home Movies (Colt, 1989)
1973	The Last Tango in Acapulco	Miguel Torres	Released in Europe in VHS with the titles Quella Viziosa di Susan and Susan et les Hommes
1978	Jungle Blue	Evor	Not credited
1984	Elvira's Movie Macabre	The Hunk	Season 4, Episode 3 #110 - (Frankenstein's Castle of Freaks)
1985	Flesh and Bullets	Policeman	Released in Europe in VHS with the title The Wife Contract
1985	Pee-wee's Big Adventure	Policeman #1	
1987	What’s Love	Officer / Jesus Christ / The Devil / Officer Buck Rowlands	Bill Cable also directed (not credited) and wrote the screenplay. Remastered and relaunched in the Blu-ray Collection Lost Picture Show (Vinegar Syndrome, 2023)
1988	La Posta in Gioco	Captain Calò	With his ex-wife Shirley Cumpanas and Christian Brando in the cast
1988	Elvira, Mistress of the Dark	Cop	
1992	Basic Instinct	Johnny Boz	
1996	The Deadly Cure	Alex	Relaunched on DVD in 2007
