= January 4 =

January 4 this year in various calendars
- Sunday, 4 January 2026
Akan	Monokwasi
Armenian	18 Arach 1475
Aztec	Huei Tozoztli 14, 8 Ehēcatl
Babylonian	14 Kislimu, 2336 SE
Balinese pawukon	Menga, Kajeng, Laba, Umanis, Maulu, Redite of Merakih, Brahma, Dadi, Pandita
Bengali	20 Poush, BS 1432
Chinese	Yang Earth Tiger・Star Mansion; Wood Snake Year, Month 11, Day 16 (Dongzhi, 1 day until Xiaohan)
Common Era	4 January 2026 CE
Coptic	26 Koiak, AM 1742
Egyptian	23 Pachon, 2774 NE
Ethiopian	26 Tākḫśāś, 2018 Amätä Məhrät
French Republican	Décade II, Quintidi de Nivôse de l'Année 234 de la République
Gregorian	4 January, AD 2026
Hebrew	15 Tevet, AM 5786
Hindu	Punarvasu・Indra; Solar: 20 Pauṣa, 1947 SE; Lunisolar: Pratipada, Kṛishna pakṣa of Pauṣa, 2082 VE; Siddhārthin・5126 KY・1,872,579
Icelandic	Sunnudagur, 12 Mörsugur 2025
Islamic	15 Rajab, AH 1447 (using tabular method)
ISO week date	2026-W01-7
Japanese	16 Shimotsuki, Reiwa 8 (Tōji, 1 day until Shōkan)
Julian	22 December, AD 2025 (AM 7535)
Julian day	2461045
Korean	16 Jwidal, 4358 DE
Maya	13.0.13.4.2; 0 Muan, 8 Ik
Roman	ante diem XI Kalendas Ianuarias, MMDCCLXXIX AUC
Solar Hijri	14 Dey, SH 1404
Tibetan	16 mgo, shing mo sbrul 2152 or 1771 or 999

<<	January					>>
Su	Mo	Tu	We	Th	Fr	Sa
				1	2	3
4	5	6	7	8	9	10
11	12	13	14	15	16	17
18	19	20	21	22	23	24
25	26	27	28	29	30	31
2026

January 4 in recent years
2026 (Sunday)
2025 (Saturday)
2024 (Thursday)
2023 (Wednesday)
2022 (Tuesday)
2021 (Monday)
2020 (Saturday)
2019 (Friday)
2018 (Thursday)
2017 (Wednesday)

January 4 is the fourth day of the year in the Gregorian calendar; 361 days remain until the end of the year (362 in leap years).

== Events ==
=== Pre-1600 ===
- 46 BC – Julius Caesar fights Titus Labienus in the Battle of Ruspina.
- 871 – Battle of Reading: Æthelred of Wessex and his brother Alfred are defeated by a Danish invasion army.

=== 1601–1900 ===
- 1642 – English Civil War: King Charles I, accompanied by 400 soldiers, attempts to arrest five members of Parliament for treason, only to discover the men had been tipped off and fled.
- 1649 – English Civil War: The Rump Parliament votes to put Charles I on trial.
- 1717 – The Netherlands, Great Britain, and France sign the Triple Alliance.
- 1762 – Great Britain declares war on Spain, which meant the entry of Spain into the Seven Years' War.
- 1798 – Constantine Hangerli arrives in Bucharest, Wallachia, as its new Prince, invested by the Ottoman Empire.
- 1844 – The first issue of the Swedish-languaged Saima newspaper founded by J. V. Snellman is published in Kuopio, Finland.
- 1853 – After having been kidnapped and sold into slavery in the American South, Solomon Northup regains his freedom; his memoir Twelve Years a Slave later becomes a national bestseller.
- 1854 – The McDonald Islands are discovered by Captain William McDonald aboard the Samarang.
- 1863 – The New Apostolic Church, a Christian and chiliastic church, is established in Hamburg, Germany.
- 1878 – Russo-Turkish War (1877–78): Sofia is liberated from Ottoman rule.
- 1884 – The Fabian Society is founded in London, United Kingdom.
- 1885 – Sino-French War: French troops under General Oscar de Négrier defeat a numerically superior Qing force at Núi Bop in northern Vietnam.
- 1896 – Utah is admitted as the 45th U.S. state.

=== 1901–present ===
- 1903 – Topsy, an elephant, is electrocuted by the owners of Luna Park, Coney Island. The Edison film company records the film Electrocuting an Elephant of Topsy's death.
- 1909 – Explorer Aeneas Mackintosh of the Imperial Trans-Antarctic Expedition escaped death by fleeing across ice floes.
- 1912 – The Scout Association is incorporated throughout the British Empire by royal charter.
- 1918 – The Finnish Declaration of Independence is recognized by Russia, Sweden, Germany and France.
- 1944 – World War II: Operation Carpetbagger, involving the dropping of arms and supplies to resistance fighters in Europe, begins.
- 1946 – The first day of a three-day "disastrous" tornado outbreak across the south-central United States leaves 41 people dead and at least 412 others injured.
- 1948 – Burma gains its independence from the United Kingdom, becoming an independent republic.
- 1951 – Korean War: Chinese and North Korean forces capture Seoul for the second time.
- 1956 – The Greek National Radical Union is formed by Konstantinos Karamanlis.
- 1958 – Sputnik 1, the first artificial Earth satellite, launched by the Soviet Union in 1957, falls to Earth from orbit.
- 1959 – Luna 1 becomes the first spacecraft to reach the vicinity of the Moon.
- 1965 – Aeroflot Flight 101/X-20 crashes on approach to Alma-Ata Airport, killing 64 people.
- 1967 – The Doors released their eponymous debut album.
- 1972 – Rose Heilbron becomes the first female judge to sit at the Old Bailey in London, UK.
- 1975 – This date overflowed the 12-bit field that had been used in TOPS-10. There were numerous problems and crashes related to this bug while an alternative format was developed.
- 1976 – The Troubles: The Ulster Volunteer Force shoots dead six Irish Catholic civilians in County Armagh, Northern Ireland. The next day, gunmen would shoot dead ten Protestant civilians nearby in retaliation.
- 1987 – The Maryland train collision: An Amtrak train en route to Boston from Washington, D.C., collides with Conrail engines in Chase, Maryland, United States, killing 16 people.
- 1989 – Second Gulf of Sidra incident: A pair of Libyan MiG-23 "Floggers" are shot down by a pair of US Navy F-14 Tomcats during an air-to-air confrontation.
- 1990 – In Pakistan's deadliest train accident an overloaded passenger train collides with an empty freight train, resulting in 307 deaths and 700 injuries.
- 1998 – A massive ice storm hits eastern Canada and the northeastern United States, continuing through January 10 and causing widespread destruction.
- 1999 – Former professional wrestler Jesse Ventura is sworn in as governor of Minnesota, United States.
- 2000 – A Norwegian passenger train departing from Trondheim, collides with a local train coming from Hamar in Åsta in Åmot Municipality; 19 people are killed and 68 injured in the accident.
- 2004 – Spirit, a NASA Mars rover, lands successfully on Mars at 04:35 UTC.
- 2004 – Mikheil Saakashvili is elected President of Georgia following the November 2003 Rose Revolution.
- 2006 – Ehud Olmert becomes acting Prime Minister of Israel after the incumbent, Ariel Sharon, suffers a second, apparently more serious stroke.
- 2007 – The 110th United States Congress convenes, electing Nancy Pelosi as the first female Speaker of the House in U.S. history.
- 2008 – A Let L-410 Turbolet crashes in the Los Roques Archipelago in Venezuela, killing 14 people.
- 2010 – The Burj Khalifa, the current tallest building in the world, officially opens in Dubai.
- 2013 – A gunman kills eight people in a house-to-house rampage in Kawit, Cavite, Philippines.
- 2018 – Hennenman–Kroonstad train crash: A passenger train operated by Shosholoza Meyl collides with a truck on a level crossing at Geneva Station between Hennenman and Kroonstad, Free State, South Africa. Twenty people are killed and 260 injured.
- 2019 – A fire in an escape room in Koszalin, Poland, kills five teenagers through carbon monoxide poisoning.

== Births ==
=== Pre-1600 ===
- 659 – Ali ibn Husayn Zayn al-Abidin (died 680)
- 1077 – Emperor Zhezong of China (died 1100)
- 1334 – Amadeus VI, Count of Savoy (died 1383)
- 1467 – Bodo VIII, Count of Stolberg-Wernigerode (died 1538)
- 1581 – James Ussher, Irish archbishop and historian (died 1656)

=== 1601–1900 ===
- 1643 (NS) – Isaac Newton, English mathematician and physicist (died 1726/27)
- 1654 – Lars Roberg, Swedish physician and academic (died 1742)
- 1672 – Hugh Boulter, English-Irish archbishop (died 1742)
- 1710 – Giovanni Battista Pergolesi, Italian composer, violinist, and organist (died 1736)
- 1720 – Johann Friedrich Agricola, German organist and composer (died 1774)
- 1731 – Karl Abraham Zedlitz, Prussian minister of education (died 1793)
- 1737 – Louis-Bernard Guyton de Morveau, chemist (died 1816)
- 1785 – Jacob Grimm, German philologist and mythologist (died 1863)
- 1809 – Louis Braille, French educator, invented Braille (died 1852)
- 1813 – Isaac Pitman, English linguist and educator (died 1897)
- 1832 – George Tryon, English admiral (died 1893)
- 1838 – General Tom Thumb, American circus performer (died 1883)
- 1839 – Carl Humann, German archaeologist, architect, and engineer (died 1896)
- 1848 – Katsura Tarō, Japanese general and politician, 6th Prime Minister of Japan (died 1913)
- 1858 – Carter Glass, American publisher and politician, 47th United States Secretary of the Treasury (died 1946)
- 1864 – Clara Emilia Smitt, Swedish doctor and author (died 1928)
- 1869 – Tommy Corcoran, American baseball player and umpire (died 1960)
- 1874 – Josef Suk, Czech violinist and composer (died 1935)
- 1877 – Gibson Gowland, English film actor (died 1951)
- 1877 – Marsden Hartley, American painter and poet (died 1943)
- 1878 – A. E. Coppard, English poet and short story writer (died 1957)
- 1878 – Augustus John, Welsh painter and illustrator (died 1961)
- 1881 – Wilhelm Lehmbruck, German sculptor (died 1919)
- 1883 – Max Eastman, American author and poet (died 1969)
- 1883 – Johanna Westerdijk, Dutch pathologist and academic (died 1961)
- 1884 – Guy Pène du Bois, American painter, critic, and educator (died 1958)
- 1889 – M. Patanjali Sastri, Indian lawyer and jurist, 2nd Chief Justice of India (died 1963)
- 1891 – Edward Brooker, English-Australian sergeant and politician, 31st Premier of Tasmania (died 1948)
- 1895 – Leroy Grumman, American engineer and businessman, co-founded Grumman Aeronautical Engineering Co. (died 1982)
- 1896 – Everett Dirksen, American politician (died 1969)
- 1896 – André Masson, French painter and illustrator (died 1987)
- 1897 – Chen Cheng, Chinese politician, Vice President of the Republic of China (died 1965)
- 1900 – James Bond, American ornithologist and zoologist (died 1989)

=== 1901–present ===
- 1901 – C. L. R. James, Trinidadian journalist and theorist (died 1989)
- 1902 – John A. McCone, American businessman and politician, 6th Director of Central Intelligence (died 1991)
- 1903 – Georg Elser, German carpenter and attempted assassin of Adolf Hitler (died 1945)
- 1913 – Malietoa Tanumafili II, Samoan ruler (died 2007)
- 1916 – Lionel Newman, American pianist and composer (died 1989)
- 1916 – Robert Parrish, American actor and director (died 1995)
- 1920 – William Colby, American intelligence officer, 10th Director of Central Intelligence (died 1996)
- 1920 – Rosalie Crutchley, British actress (died 1997)
- 1924 – Marianne Werner, German shot putter (died 2023)
- 1925 – Veikko Hakulinen, Finnish skier and technician (died 2003)
- 1927 – Paul Desmarais, Canadian businessman and philanthropist (died 2013)
- 1927 – Barbara Rush, American actress (died 2024)
- 1929 – Günter Schabowski, German journalist and politician (died 2015)
- 1930 – Sorrell Booke, American actor and director (died 1994)
- 1930 – Don Shula, American football player and coach (died 2020)
- 1931 – William Deane, Australian judge and politician, 22nd Governor-General of Australia
- 1931 – Nora Iuga, Romanian poet, writer and translator
- 1932 – Carlos Saura, Spanish director and screenwriter (died 2023)
- 1932 – Clint Hill, American Secret Service agent (died 2025)
- 1934 – Rudolf Schuster, Slovak politician, 2nd President of Slovakia
- 1935 – Floyd Patterson, American boxer (died 2006)
- 1937 – Grace Bumbry, American operatic soprano (died 2023)
- 1937 – Dyan Cannon, American actress, director, producer, and screenwriter
- 1938 – Jim Norton, Irish stage, film and television actor
- 1938 – Eberhard Wagner, German academic, linguist and author
- 1940 – Brian Josephson, Welsh physicist and academic, Nobel Prize laureate
- 1940 – Gao Xingjian, Chinese novelist, playwright, and critic, Nobel Prize laureate
- 1941 – George P. Cosmatos, Italian-Canadian director and screenwriter (died 2005)
- 1941 – Kalpnath Rai, Indian politician (died 1999)
- 1942 – Bolaji Akinyemi, Nigerian political scientist, academic, and politician
- 1942 – Jim Downing, American race car driver and inventor
- 1942 – John McLaughlin, English guitarist and songwriter
- 1943 – Doris Kearns Goodwin, American historian and author
- 1943 – Hwang Sok-yong, South Korean author and educator
- 1944 – Gary Stevens, Australian rugby league player (died 2025)
- 1944 – Alan Sutherland, New Zealand rugby player (died 2020)
- 1945 – Vesa-Matti Loiri, Finnish actor, musician and comedian (died 2022)
- 1945 – Richard R. Schrock, American chemist and academic, Nobel Prize laureate
- 1946 – Arthur Conley, American singer-songwriter (died 2003)
- 1947 – Chris Cutler, English percussionist, lyricist and music theorist
- 1947 – Marie-Thérèse Letablier, French sociologist and academic
- 1948 – Kostas Davourlis, Greek footballer (died 1992)
- 1948 – Cissé Mariam Kaïdama Sidibé, Malian civil servant and politician, Prime Minister of Mali (died 2021)
- 1949 – Mick Mills, English footballer and manager
- 1949 – Bwanga Tshimen, Congolese footballer
- 1950 – Khondakar Ashraf Hossain, Bangladesh poet and academic (died 2013)
- 1953 – Norberto Alonso, Argentinian footballer
- 1954 – Rob Kerin, Australian politician, 43rd Premier of South Australia
- 1954 – Tina Knowles, American fashion designer, founded House of Deréon
- 1956 – Tom Borton, American jazz saxophonist, songwriter and composer (died 2011)
- 1956 – Zehava Gal-On, Israeli politician
- 1956 – Ann Magnuson, American actress and performance artist
- 1956 – Bernard Sumner, English singer-songwriter, guitarist, and producer
- 1957 – Patty Loveless, American singer-songwriter and guitarist
- 1958 – Matt Frewer, American-Canadian actor
- 1958 – Julian Sands, English actor (died 2023)
- 1960 – Gavin Miller, Australian rugby league player
- 1960 – Michael Stipe, American singer-songwriter and producer
- 1961 – Sidney Green, American basketball player and coach
- 1961 – Cliff Levingston, American basketball player and coach
- 1961 – Graham McTavish, Scottish actor and author
- 1962 – Joe Kleine, American basketball player and coach
- 1963 – Dave Foley, Canadian comedian, actor, director, and producer
- 1963 – Till Lindemann, German singer, songwriter, and poet
- 1963 – Martina Proeber, German diver
- 1964 – Susan Devoy, New Zealand squash player
- 1964 – Dot-Marie Jones, American actress and athlete
- 1964 – Adrian Shelford, New Zealand rugby league player (died 2003)
- 1965 – Guy Forget, French tennis player
- 1965 – Beth Gibbons, English singer and songwriter
- 1965 – Craig Revel Horwood, Australian-English dancer, choreographer, and director
- 1965 – Julia Ormond, English actress and producer
- 1966 – Deana Carter, American singer-songwriter and guitarist
- 1967 – Johnny Nelson, English boxer and sportscaster
- 1967 – David Toms, American golfer and philanthropist
- 1967 – David Wilson, Australian rugby player
- 1969 – Corie Blount, American basketball player
- 1969 – Kees van Wonderen, Dutch footballer and manager
- 1970 – Josh Stamberg, American actor
- 1971 – Shane Walker, Australian rugby league player
- 1971 – Colin Ward, Australian rugby league player
- 1973 – Frank Høj, Danish cyclist
- 1974 – Danilo Hondo, German cyclist
- 1975 – Shane Carwin, American mixed martial artist and wrestler
- 1975 – Paul Watson, English footballer
- 1976 – Ted Lilly, American baseball player
- 1978 – Dominik Hrbatý, Slovak tennis player
- 1979 – Shergo Biran, German footballer
- 1979 – Tristan Gommendy, French racing driver
- 1980 – D'Arcy Carden, American actress and comedian
- 1980 – Miguel Monteiro, Portuguese footballer
- 1980 – Justin Ontong, South African cricketer
- 1982 – Richard Logan, English footballer
- 1982 – Danny Sullivan, Australian rugby league player
- 1982 – Kang Hye-jung, South Korean actress
- 1983 – Will Bynum, American basketball player
- 1983 – Richard Rankin, Scottish film, television and theatre actor
- 1984 – Javi Fuego, Spanish footballer
- 1984 – Jiří Hudler, Czech ice hockey player
- 1985 – Lenora Crichlow, British actress
- 1985 – Kari Aalvik Grimsbø, Norwegian handball player
- 1985 – Gökhan Gönül, Turkish footballer
- 1985 – Al Jefferson, American basketball player
- 1985 – Jung Sung-ryong, South Korean footballer
- 1985 – Ross Turnbull, English footballer and coach
- 1986 – Younès Kaboul, French footballer
- 1986 – Andrei Krauchanka, Belarusian decathlete
- 1986 – Russell Martin, English footballer and manager
- 1986 – James Milner, English footballer
- 1986 – Lo Mutac, American actor, comedian, musician, and writer
- 1987 – Marissa Coleman, American basketball player
- 1987 – Przemysław Tytoń, Polish footballer
- 1987 – Danny Simpson, English footballer
- 1987 – Kay Voser, Swiss footballer
- 1988 – Anestis Argyriou, Greek footballer
- 1988 – Maximilian Riedmüller, German footballer
- 1989 – Kevin Pillar, American baseball player
- 1989 – Graham Rahal, American race car driver
- 1990 – Iago Falque, Spanish footballer
- 1990 – Raisel Iglesias, Cuban baseball player
- 1990 – Toni Kroos, German footballer
- 1990 – Alberto Paloschi, Italian footballer
- 1991 – Charles Melton, American actor
- 1992 – Kris Bryant, American baseball player
- 1992 – Quincy Promes, Dutch footballer
- 1993 – James Michael McAdoo, American basketball player
- 1993 – Mahmoud Metwalli, Egyptian footballer
- 1994 – Derrick Henry, American football player
- 1995 – Sarah Nurse, Canadian ice hockey player
- 1995 – Adam Webster, English footballer
- 1996 – Michael Dickson, Australian gridiron football player
- 1996 – Jackson Hastings, Australian rugby league player
- 1996 – Marcus Ingvartsen, Danish footballer
- 1996 – Jasmine Paolini, Italian tennis player
- 1997 – Angeliño, Spanish footballer
- 1997 – Ante Žižić, Croatian basketball player
- 1998 – Coco Jones, American singer-songwriter and actress
- 1998 – Arnoldas Kulboka, Lithuanian basketball player
- 1998 – Rodrigo Garro, Argentine footballer
- 1998 – Liza Soberano, Filipina actress
- 1999 – Wessam Abou Ali, Palestinian footballer
- 1999 – Daniel Arzani, Iranian-Australian footballer
- 1999 – Jan-Niklas Beste, German footballer
- 1999 – Nico Hischier, Swiss ice hockey player
- 1999 – Jaeman Salmon, Australian rugby league player
- 1999 – Collin Sexton, American basketball player
- 2000 – Max Aarons, English footballer
- 2000 – Facundo Colidio, Argentine footballer
- 2001 – Odilon Kossounou, Ivorian footballer
- 2001 – Lola Young, English singer and songwriter
- 2002 – Vladyslav Vanat, Ukrainian footballer
- 2003 – Jaeden Martell, American actor
- 2003 – Kevin, Brazilian footballer
- 2004 – Victor Wembanyama, French basketball player
- 2005 – Rob Dillingham, American basketball player
- 2005 – Emil Højlund, Danish footballer
- 2005 – Oscar Højlund, Danish footballer
- 2005 – Dafne Keen, British-Spanish actress
- 2006 – Marc Guiu, Spanish footballer

== Deaths ==
=== Pre-1600 ===
- 871 – Æthelwulf, Saxon ealdorman
- 874 – Hasan al-Askari, eleventh of the Twelve Imams (probable; b. 846)
- 1248 – Sancho II of Portugal (born 1209)
- 1344 – Robert de Lisle, 1st Baron Lisle, English peer (born 1288)
- 1399 – Nicholas Eymerich, Catalan theologian and inquisitor
- 1424 – Muzio Sforza, Italian condottiero (born 1369)
- 1428 – Frederick I, Elector of Saxony (born 1370)
- 1584 – Tobias Stimmer, Swiss painter and illustrator (born 1539)

=== 1601–1900 ===
- 1604 – Ferenc Nádasdy, Hungarian noble (born 1555)
- 1695 – François-Henri de Montmorency, duc de Luxembourg, French general (born 1628)
- 1761 – Stephen Hales, English clergyman and physiologist (born 1677)
- 1782 – Ange-Jacques Gabriel, French architect, designed École Militaire (born 1698)
- 1786 – Moses Mendelssohn, German philosopher and theologian (born 1729)
- 1804 – Charlotte Lennox, English author and poet (born 1730)
- 1821 – Elizabeth Ann Seton, American nun and saint (born 1774)
- 1825 – Ferdinand I of the Two Sicilies (born 1751)
- 1863 – Roger Hanson, American general (born 1827)
- 1874 – Thomas Gregson, English-Australian lawyer and politician, 2nd Premier of Tasmania (born 1798)
- 1877 – Cornelius Vanderbilt, American businessman and philanthropist (born 1794)
- 1880 – Anselm Feuerbach, German painter and educator (born 1829)
- 1880 – Edward William Cooke, English painter and illustrator (born 1811)
- 1882 – John William Draper, English-American physician, chemist, and photographer (born 1811)
- 1883 – Antoine Chanzy, French general (born 1823)
- 1891 – Antoine Labelle, Canadian priest (born 1833)
- 1896 – Joseph Hubert Reinkens, German bishop and academic (born 1821)
- 1900 – Stanisław Mieroszewski, Polish-born politician, writer, historian and member of the Imperial Council of Austria (born 1827)

=== 1901–present ===
- 1904 – Anna Winlock, American astronomer and academic (born 1857)
- 1910 – Léon Delagrange, French pilot and sculptor (born 1873)
- 1912 – Clarence Dutton, American geologist and soldier (born 1841)
- 1919 – Georg von Hertling, German academic and politician, 7th Chancellor of the German Empire (born 1843)
- 1920 – Benito Pérez Galdós, Spanish author and playwright (born 1843)
- 1924 – Alfred Grünfeld, Austrian pianist and composer (born 1852)
- 1925 – Nellie Cashman, American nurse, restaurateur, entrepreneur, and gold prospector (born 1845)
- 1926 – Margherita of Savoy, Queen of Italy (born 1851)
- 1927 – Süleyman Nazif, Turkish poet and civil servant (born 1870)
- 1931 – Art Acord, American actor and stuntman (born 1890)
- 1931 – Louise, Princess Royal of the United Kingdom (born 1867)
- 1931 – Mohammad Ali Jauhar, Indian Muslim activist (born 1878)
- 1941 – Henri Bergson, French philosopher and academic, Nobel Prize laureate (born 1859)
- 1943 – Jerzy Iwanow-Szajnowicz, Greek-Polish swimmer and water polo player (born 1911)
- 1943 – Marina Raskova, Russian pilot and navigator (born 1912)
- 1944 – Kaj Munk, Danish playwright and pastor (born 1898)
- 1960 – Albert Camus, French novelist, philosopher, and journalist, Nobel Prize laureate (born 1913)
- 1961 – Erwin Schrödinger, Austrian physicist and academic, Nobel Prize laureate (born 1887)
- 1965 – T. S. Eliot, American-English poet, playwright, and critic, Nobel Prize laureate (born 1888)
- 1967 – Donald Campbell, English racing driver and world speed record holder (born 1921)
- 1969 – Paul Chambers, American bassist and composer (born 1935)
- 1975 – Carlo Levi, Italian painter, author, and activist (born 1902)
- 1985 – Brian Horrocks, Indian-English general (born 1895)
- 1986 – Christopher Isherwood, English-American author and academic (born 1904)
- 1986 – Phil Lynott, Irish singer-songwriter, bass player, and producer (born 1949)
- 1988 – Lily Laskine, French harp player (born 1893)
- 1990 – Harold Eugene Edgerton, American engineer and academic (born 1903)
- 1990 – Henry Bolte, Australian politician, 38th Premier of Victoria (born 1908)
- 1994 – R. D. Burman, Indian film composer and music director (born 1939)
- 1995 – Eduardo Mata, Mexican conductor and composer (born 1942)
- 1995 – Sol Tax, American anthropologist and academic (born 1907)
- 1997 – Harry Helmsley, American businessman (born 1909)
- 1998 – Mae Questel, American actress (born 1908)
- 1999 – Iron Eyes Cody, American actor and stuntman (born 1904)
- 2001 – Les Brown, American bandleader and composer (born 1912)
- 2004 – Brian Gibson, English director and screenwriter (born 1944)
- 2004 – Joan Aiken, English author (born 1924)
- 2004 – John Toland, American historian and author (born 1912)
- 2005 – Bud Poile, Canadian ice hockey player, coach, and manager (born 1924)
- 2005 – Frank Harary, American mathematician and academic (born 1921)
- 2005 – Humphrey Carpenter, English radio host and author (born 1946)
- 2005 – Robert Heilbroner, American economist and historian (born 1919)
- 2006 – Irving Layton, Romanian-Canadian poet and academic (born 1912)
- 2006 – Maktoum bin Rashid Al Maktoum, Emirati politician, 1st Prime Minister of the United Arab Emirates (born 1946)
- 2006 – Milton Himmelfarb, American sociographer, author, and academic (born 1918)
- 2007 – Helen Hill, American director and producer (born 1970)
- 2007 – Marais Viljoen, South African politician, 5th State President of South Africa (born 1915)
- 2008 – Xavier Chamorro Cardenal, Nicaraguan journalist (born 1932)
- 2009 – Gert Jonke, Austrian poet, playwright, and author (born 1946)
- 2010 – Johan Ferrier, Surinamese educator and politician, 1st President of Suriname (born 1910)
- 2010 – Tsutomu Yamaguchi, Japanese engineer (born 1916)
- 2011 – Coen Moulijn, Dutch footballer (born 1937)
- 2011 – Gerry Rafferty, Scottish singer-songwriter (born 1947)
- 2011 – Salmaan Taseer, Pakistani businessman and politician, 26th Governor of Punjab, Pakistan (born 1944)
- 2011 – Mohamed Bouazizi, Tunisian street vendor who caused the Tunisian Revolution, which was the first revolution in the Arab Spring. (born 1984)
- 2012 – Eve Arnold, American photographer and journalist (born 1912)
- 2012 – Rod Robbie, English-Canadian architect, designed the Canadian Pavilion and Rogers Centre (born 1928)
- 2013 – Anwar Shamim, Pakistani general (born 1931)
- 2013 – Zoran Žižić, Montenegrin politician, 4th Prime Minister of the Federal Republic of Yugoslavia (born 1951)
- 2015 – Pino Daniele, Italian singer-songwriter and guitarist (born 1955)
- 2016 – S. H. Kapadia, Indian lawyer, judge, and politician, 38th Chief Justice of India (born 1947)
- 2016 – Stephen W. Bosworth, American academic and diplomat, United States Ambassador to South Korea (born 1939)
- 2017 – Milt Schmidt, Canadian ice hockey player, coach and general manager (born 1918)
- 2017 – Georges Prêtre, French orchestral and opera conductor (born 1924)
- 2019 – Harold Brown, 14th United States Secretary of Defense (born 1927)
- 2020 – Tom Long, Australian actor (born 1968)
- 2021 – Tanya Roberts, American actress (born 1949)
- 2023 – Rosi Mittermaier, German alpine skier and Olympic champion (born 1950)
- 2024 – Glynis Johns, British actress and singer (born 1923)
- 2024 – David Soul, American-British actor and singer (born 1943)
- 2024 – Christian Oliver, German actor (born 1972)
- 2025 – Ana Gligić, Serbian virologist (born 1934)
- 2026 – Michael Reagan, American political commentator (born 1945)

== Holidays and observances ==
- Christian feast day:
  - Angela of Foligno
  - Elizabeth Ann Seton
  - Ferréol of Uzès
  - Mavilus
  - Pharaildis of Ghent
  - Rigobert
  - January 4 (Eastern Orthodox liturgics)
- The eleventh of the Twelve Days of Christmas. (Western Christianity)
- Independence Day (Myanmar), celebrates the independence of Myanmar from the United Kingdom in 1948.
- Colonial Martyrs Repression Day (Angola)
- Day of the Martyrs (Democratic Republic of the Congo)
- Ogoni Day (Movement for the Survival of the Ogoni People)
- Tokyo Dome Show: The annual Wrestle Kingdom event run by New Japan Pro-Wrestling
- World Braille Day

== Notes ==
- Watkins, Basil (2015). The Book of Saints: A Comprehensive Biographical Dictionary. Bloomsbury Academic. p. 604. ISBN 978-0-567-66456-3.
