= Paul Jasmin =

American artist (1935–2025)

- Jasmin at home in Los Angeles
- Born: April 15, 1935; Helena, Montana, U.S.
- Died: May 24, 2025 (aged 90); Los Angeles, California, U.S.
- Occupations: Actor, artist, photographer, illustrator
- Known for: Fashion photography, teaching at Art Center College of Design
- Notable work: Hollywood Cowboy; Lost Angeles; California Dreaming

Paul Jasmin (April 15, 1935 – May 24, 2025) was an American actor and artist based in Los Angeles, California. Jasmin was an illustrator, a painter, and an actor before finding photography. His commercial work appeared in Vogue, Teen Vogue, GQ, Details, V Magazine, V Man, Vogue Hommes, W Magazine, and Interview. Jasmin illustrated and photographed fashion campaigns for luxury brands, including Valentino, A.P.C, and he sat on the faculty of Art Center College of Design in Pasadena, California.

== Early career ==
In 1954, Jasmin left his hometown of Helena, Montana, to travel and pursue acting in Paris, Egypt, New York, Morocco, and Los Angeles. He appears as an actor in Riot in Juvenile Prison (1959), Midnight Cowboy (1969) and, later, Adaptation (2002). Together with actresses Virginia Gregg and Jeanette Nolan, Paul Jasmin provided the voice for Norman's mother in Alfred Hitchcock's classic Psycho (1960). The three voices were thoroughly mixed except for the last speech, which is all Gregg's. In season 1 and episode 34 of Have Gun – Will Travel, he played the honorable son Hank Bosworth in "Three Sons" (1958).

After Jasmin's brief career as an actor the artist pursued painting and illustration. From 1965–1975, Jasmin illustrated fashion campaigns for the luxury brand, Valentino. He also illustrated the poster for the 1972 film Bijou, directed by Wakefield Poole.

== Photography ==
Jason Wilder, Los Angeles, from California Dreaming (2007)

At the urging of friend and photographer Bruce Weber, Jasmin began photographing for commercial clients in the late 1970s. Jasmin realized campaigns for brands including, A.P.C., SAKS, Nautica and Mr Porter.

Jasmin taught photography at the Art Center College of Design in Pasadena, California. Some of his most famous student-mentees include Sofia Coppola, Melodie McDaniel, Dewey Nicks, and Tarsem Singh.

== Personal life ==
Jasmin was openly gay. He died on May 24, 2025, at the age of 90.

== Monographs ==
- Jasmin, Paul (2002). Hollywood Cowboy. Santa Fe, New Mexico: Arena Editions. ISBN 978-1-892041-55-5.
- Jasmin, Paul; Coppola, Sofia; Weber, Bruce (2004). Lost Angeles. Göttingen: Steidl. ISBN 978-3-86521-026-5.
- Jasmin, Paul (2010). California Dreaming. Göttingen: Steidl. ISBN 978-3-86930-030-6.
