= Carlos Tobalina =

Carlos Tobalina may refer to:

- Carlos Tobalina (athlete) (born 1985), a Spanish athlete
- Carlos Tobalina (filmmaker) (1925–1989), a Peruvian-born filmmaker
