= Elvira: Mistress of the Dark (film) =

1988 film directed by James Signorelli

- Theatrical release poster
- Directed by: James Signorelli
- Written by: Sam Egan; John Paragon; Cassandra Peterson
- Produced by: Eric Gardner; Mark Pierson
- Starring: Cassandra Peterson; W. Morgan Sheppard; Daniel Greene; Jeff Conaway; Susan Kellermann; Edie McClurg
- Cinematography: Hanania Baer
- Edited by: Battle Davis
- Music by: James B. Campbell
- Production companies: New World Pictures; NBC Productions
- Distributed by: New World Pictures
- Release date: September 30, 1988
- Running time: 96 minutes
- Country: United States
- Language: English
- Budget: $7.5 million
- Box office: $5.5 million

Elvira: Mistress of the Dark is a 1988 American comedy horror film directed by James Signorelli, starring Cassandra Peterson as eccentric horror host Elvira. The film's screenplay, written by Peterson, John Paragon, and Sam Egan, follows Elvira inheriting a house nestled in the heart of an overtly prudish community.

Production of the film began following Peterson's success playing Elvira on the television program Elvira's Movie Macabre (1981-1986). She enlisted the aid of numerous writers and actors who she had previously worked with in the comedy troupe The Groundlings. Filming took place from January to March 1988.

Elvira: Mistress of the Dark was released on September 30, 1988. It received mixed reviews, with critics variously praising or deriding its writing and humor. Peterson was nominated for a Saturn Award for Best Actress as well as a Golden Raspberry Award for Worst Actress. The film was a box office failure upon release, grossing $5.5 million against a budget of $7.5 million. It has since attained a cult following, and remastered versions have been released on home media. A second film, Elvira's Haunted Hills, was released in 2001, with Peterson reprising her role.

== Plot ==
Buxom Los Angeles TV horror hostess Elvira, Mistress of the Dark, quits her job after the station's new owner sexually harasses her. She plans to open an act at the Flamingo Hotel in Las Vegas, but needs $50,000 for the project. Upon learning she is a beneficiary of her deceased great-aunt Morgana Talbot, she travels to Fallwell, Massachusetts, to claim the inheritance, which includes a mansion, a recipe book, and Morgana's pet poodle, Algonquin, which Elvira renames Gonk. Unbeknownst to Elvira, the recipe book is actually a spellbook, and Gonk is an animal familiar with the ability to shapeshift.

In Fallwell, Elvira's worldly attitude and revealing clothes set the conservative town council, led by Chastity Pariah, against her, but theater operator Bob Redding befriends her. The town's teenagers quickly accept her, to the chagrin of their parents, who consider her a bad influence. Bowling alley owner Patty is interested in Bob, and at Elvira's late-night horror film festival at Bob's theater, she succeeds in humiliating Elvira. Elvira struggles to sell the house so she can depart for Las Vegas.

Meanwhile, Elvira is unaware that her harsh but seemingly harmless uncle, Vincent Talbot, is actually a warlock who is obsessed with obtaining Morgana's spellbook. He offers Elvira $50 for the book. When he visits Morgana's house to buy it from Elvira, Gonk hides it much to Vincent's dismay. He plans to kill Elvira and conquer the world, and has been fueling the townspeople's hostility.

Elvira tries to impress Bob with a home-cooked dinner, but mistakenly uses the spellbook as a cookbook and summons a creature that attacks them. Elvira later discovers a letter that reveals the magical prowess of her mother, great-aunt, and uncle, as well as herself. She also finds a magical ring that can be used for protection.

When Elvira tries to re-conjure the creature against the Morality Club at their picnic for revenge, she prepares the brew incorrectly and it instead has an aphrodisiac effect; the adults begin behaving sexually, dancing and removing their clothing while Elvira observes nearby. She is accosted by Vincent, who again offers to buy the book for a much higher price of $500, which Elvira refuses this time. When Patty confronts Elvira, the resulting fistfight ends up humiliating Patty by revealing that her bra is stuffed.

Vincent leads the townspeople in arresting Elvira for witchcraft, which is still illegal in the state. They decide to burn her at the stake. The teenagers try to free her from jail but instead accidentally lock themselves into a different cell. Bob tries to recover the spellbook from the mansion, but is tied up by Vincent and his goons, who take the book. Gonk transforms into a rat and successfully frees Bob by gnawing through his bonds.

Elvira is tied to a stake and the fire is lit, but she uses Morgana's ring to summon a rainstorm that quenches the flames; she then escapes with Bob. At the mansion, Elvira and Vincent engage in a magical battle that sets fire to the house. Elvira successfully banishes Vincent to the underworld, while the house and all of the magical artifacts are destroyed.

The next day, Elvira prepares to leave town. The townspeople apologize for their behavior, and they ask Elvira to stay. She kisses Bob, but as she is homeless, she insists that she must leave. As his sole living relative, Elvira has inherited Vincent's estate, which allows her to open her show in Las Vegas, where she performs a lavishly produced musical number.

== Cast ==
- Cassandra Peterson as Elvira / Morgana Talbot
- W. Morgan Sheppard as Vincent Talbot
- Daniel Greene as Bob Redding
- Susan Kellermann as Patty
- Jeff Conaway as Travis
- Edie McClurg as Chastity Pariah
- Kurt Fuller as Harold Glotter
- William Duell as Lesley Meeker
- Pat Crawford Brown as Mrs. Meeker
- Frank Collison as Billy
- Hugh Gillin as sheriff
- Bill Morey as Mr. Rivers
- Ellen Dunning as Robin Meeker
- Ira Heiden as Bo
- Scott Morris as Sean
- Kris Kamm as Randy
- Robert Benedetti as Calvin Cobb
- Lynne Marie Stewart (credited as Lynn Stewart) as bartender
- Phil Rubenstein as director
- Tress MacNeille as anchorwoman / Morgana Talbot (voice)
- Bill Cable as cop
- John Paragon as gas station attendant
- Joey Arias (credited as Joseph Arias) as hitchhiker
- Binnie as Gonk
- Alex Magno (credited as Alexandre Magno) as Las Vegas dancer
- Deron McBee as Las Vegas muscle man

== Production ==
=== Pre-production ===
As her Elvira character rose to fame, Cassandra Peterson announced plans to spin her off into a feature film. NBC casting director Joel Thurm pitched the idea of a sitcom to network president Brandon Tartikoff, who became enthusiastic about the notion. However, Peterson had her heart set on bringing the character to the big screen, and there were concerns that she would never get the opportunity if she made the leap to prime time. Tartikoff later finalized a deal for NBC to produce a film, which would possibly be followed up with sequels, and eventually a TV series but he ended up leaving the network before a show materialized.

Peterson and frequent writing collaborator John Paragon met in the comedy troupe The Groundlings, and he worked his way up from recurring guest-star to writer on her Movie Macabre series. Sam Egan was brought into the fold because he was an experienced TV writer and had impressed Peterson with his script for The Fall Guy episode "October the 31st", which he had written explicitly for her. Tartikoff pushed for a storyline similar to Harper Valley PTA, and after the first draft was turned in, the writers were forced to add a group of teenagers, which resulted in reducing screen time for all of the other characters.

After appearing in a small part in Pee-wee's Big Adventure, Peterson thought Tim Burton was the perfect choice to direct her film, but he got tied up with the production of Beetlejuice. Tartikoff tapped James Signorelli to direct. Although Signorelli only had one feature film to his credit, Easy Money, he had been prolifically churning out commercial parodies on Saturday Night Live since 1977.

Peterson was dealt a crushing blow with the 1986 AIDS-related death of Robert Redding, to whom she dedicated the film and named the character of Bob Redding after. She and Redding had collaborated to create Elvira's look, and he painted the portrait which is used for Morgana Talbot. Accustomed to Redding styling her wigs, Peterson became perpetually unhappy with their appearance and later admitted that she was too harsh with the film's wig stylist.

The name of the fictional town of Fallwell, Massachusetts, where Elvira moves to in the film, has been noted for its resemblance to the surname of Jerry Falwell, an American televangelist, conservative activist, and co-founder of the Moral Majority.

=== Casting ===
Many roles were played by Cassandra Peterson's associates from The Groundlings, including Edie McClurg (Chastity Pariah), Tress MacNeille (anchorwoman), Joey Arias (hitchhiker), Lynne Marie Stewart (bartender), Deryl Carroll (Charlie), and co-writer John Paragon (gas station attendant). Paul Reubens was also supposed to appear in a bit part, but this became unfeasible when Big Top Pee-wee went into concurrent production, so his cameo came in the form of a Pee-wee Herman doll that is visible in Elvira's dressing room. Additionally, Eve Smith was a regular on Movie Macabre (playing Elvira's Auntie Virus), Peterson's parents were prominently featured as extras during her character's arrival in Fallwell, her assistant, Sharon Hays, was the game show girl and the motorcycle cop was played by ex-boyfriend Bill Cable, whom she had posed with for a 1974 Playgirl magazine spread.

The role of Elvira's Uncle Vinnie Talbot was written specifically for Vincent Price, and although they had become friends, he passed due to the racy material. Producer Joel Thurm zeroed in on William Morgan Sheppard for the part, but he became frustrated as Sheppard changed his readings from one audition to the next. On the day Sheppard had to audition for network executives, Thurm told him to be "more evil", and Sheppard took this note to heart, which won him the role.

Bob Redding was written as the male "equivalent of a blonde bimbo", but they had difficulty finding anyone who had both the looks and the acting skills to pull it off. All eyes were on Daniel Greene when he came in to audition, and he was convinced that he got the part due to a genuinely stunned, naive reaction that he had to one of Peterson's off-color remarks.

Kurt Fuller, who was cast as Fallwell's realtor, Harold Glotter, was at the time working as an actual realtor to support himself. He was so convinced that he had bombed his audition that he called his agent right after to declare that he was quitting acting. Later that day, his agent called to say that he had been offered the role.

The role of Randy was narrowed down to two actors: Kris Kamm and Brad Pitt. Kamm won the part because Peterson felt Pitt was so handsome that Elvira would ignore Bob and fawn over him.

=== Filming ===
The film was shot over a span of eight weeks, between January and March 1988. The first scenes were shot at a bowling alley in Montrose, California, and Peterson worried about beginning the production with her character's big monologue, but much bigger stresses were soon to follow.

One of the most problematic issues was Peterson's costar, Binnie, a temperamental poodle that did not seem to like anyone except his trainer. Peterson would not allow them to use a permanent dye on the dog's fur, so instead a vegetable dye mixture that had to be touched up and reapplied daily was used. The dog had trouble following instructions, resulting in missed cues and costly retakes. The dog also bit Kurt Fuller's ankle too hard, leaving permanent scars on the actor, and certain scenes had to dubbed over to mask the trainer's commands.

== Music ==
The original musical score was composed by James B. Campbell. Although there were several well-known songs in the film, licensing the original recordings was cost-prohibitive, so they were covered by stock singers. The goofy ditty "Chicken Fried Steak", which is faintly heard at the gas station, was an original composition written and performed by Gary Austin, the founder of The Groundlings.

There was no soundtrack album and the majority of songs have never been issued, but "Here I Am" and two different versions of Lori Chako's "Once Bitten, Twice Shy" eventually surfaced on the digital compilation Elvira's Gravest Hits.

Song	Writer(s)	Performer
"Elvira's Theme"	Mark Pierson	Mark Pierson
"Once Bitten, Twice Shy"	Lori Chacko, Joey Balin	Lori Chacko
"Chicken Fried Steak"	Gary Austin	Gary Austin
"Tuesday's Come and Gone"	Ron McGowan, Edwina Travis Chin	Pamela Des Barres
"99 Bottles of Beer on the Wall"	Traditional	Cassandra Peterson
"New World Symphony"	Antonín Dvořák	Pro Musica Symphony Orchestra
"Shout"	O'Kelly Isley, Ronald Isley, Rudolph Isley	Larry Wright
"Town Without Pity"	Dimitri Tiomkin, Ned Washington	Jess Harnell
"Weeping Like a Willow"	Dan Slider	Lynn Fanelli
"Bad"	Michael Jackson	Cassandra Peterson
"Maniac"	Michael Sembello, Dennis Matkosky	Rick Cershaw
"I Put a Spell on You"	Screamin' Jay Hawkins	Joanna St. Claire
"Here I Am"	Gary Poirot, John Paragon	Cassandra Peterson

== Reception ==
=== Critical reception ===
On the review aggregator website Rotten Tomatoes, 58% of 26 critics' reviews are positive. The website's consensus reads: "A gothic, campy, raunchy comedy elevated by Cassandra Peterson's iconic persona yet driven off course by one-note jokes, this isn't the best — or worst — introduction to Elvira, Mistress of the Dark." Metacritic, which uses a weighted average, assigned the film a score of 43 out of 100, based on 5 critics, indicating "mixed or average" reviews.

Caryn James in The New York Times rated the film 2/5 in 1988 saying that "there are only a couple of fresh and funny moments". Writing for The Washington Post in 1999, Richard Harrington said the film "is stupid fun, a distaff, gothic version of Pee-wee's Playhouse. (...) [Elvira is] fun, a Transylvania Valley Girl grown up into the Queen of the Bs, but after 96 minutes you may start thinking more fondly about those '50s and '60s camp classics she's usually interspersed with."

Anthony Arrigo wrote in Dread Central in 2020 that "Elvira managed to make a seemingly oxymoronic character into a household name, built off her bountiful looks, quick wit, and indefatigable charisma." In Nashville Scene in 2021, Jason Shawhan said it's "campy, witty and always eager to push the bawdy limits of a PG-13 rating". On Common Sense Media, Kat Halstead wrote in 2024 that "It may fall into the 'so bad it's good' category (...) but this cult horror comedy is smarter than it first appears."

Peterson later said that New World Pictures' bankruptcy during the film's release severely curtailed its theatrical rollout, claiming it went from a planned 2,500 or 3,000 theaters to 150. Box Office Mojo noted the film's widest release was 627 theaters.

=== Awards and nominations ===
The film received a Golden Raspberry Award for Worst Actress nomination for Cassandra Peterson at the 9th Golden Raspberry Awards in 1989, losing to Liza Minnelli for both Arthur 2: On the Rocks and Rent-a-Cop. "I even lost the Worst Actress, now that's sad!" Peterson quipped.

=== Nominations ===
Award	Category	Nominee(s)	Result
Fantasporto 1990	Best Film	—N/a	Nominated
16th Saturn Awards	Best Actress	Cassandra Peterson	Nominated
9th Golden Raspberry Awards	Worst Actress	Cassandra Peterson	Nominated
1988 Stinkers Bad Movie Awards	Worst Picture	—N/a	Nominated

== Legacy ==
=== 1990s–2000s: Proposed sequel, and Elvira's Haunted Hills ===
Peterson quickly sold a script for a sequel, but it became tied up in red tape when Carolco Pictures went bankrupt. She followed through with plans to star in a sitcom, but 1993's The Elvira Show did not secure a spot on the TV schedule. Soon after, she announced the forthcoming Elvira vs. the Vampire Women, but a contract dispute with Roger Corman prevented the film from being produced.

The script for Elvira's Haunted Hills was written in the late 1990s, but after spending three years trying to get Hollywood to produce the project, she and then-husband Mark Pierson decided to finance it themselves. The shoot in Romania was grueling, and they had difficulty securing distribution. In the same vein as Young Frankenstein, Haunted Hills spoofs the 1960s Roger Corman/Edgar Allan Poe films. Other than the Elvira character, there's no direct connection between the films, although it is sometimes referred to as a prequel since it is set more than a century earlier.

=== 2010s–present: Netflix, Shudder, and Arrow 4K Blu-ray ===
Prior to Mistress of the Dark, there were already plans to feature Elvira in an animated series, but this has yet to materialize. In 2019, Peterson pitched the idea to Netflix and Shudder, which both passed. Around the same time, the character made her inaugural Scooby-Doo appearance in Return to Zombie Island. Elvira returned the following year with an increased role in Happy Halloween, Scooby-Doo!, in which she spends the bulk of in a flat-top variation of the Macabremobile and dispatches another monster with a stiletto to the forehead.

Peterson's Scooby experience was so positive that, after years of trying to get a third film produced, she announced in 2020 that the next Elvira film will likely be an animated feature. Although no specifics have been released, a detailed story treatment has been completed.

Commenting on the remaster of the film for Blu-ray in 4K resolution in August 2020 on Dread Central, Anthony Arrigo wrote that "the film was shot on a low budget and these roots are apparent but the increase in resolution brings with it a brighter color palette (...) Arrow Video has delivered an accurate reproduction of the 35 mm experience." Arrow's Ultra HD Blu-ray had a commercial release on November 12, 2024.

In October 2021, Elvira's 40th birthday special was announced on the YouTube channel for Shudder streaming, with the video "Burn Witch Burn". Throughout October, for Halloween, Elvira featured horror movies on Netflix's YouTube channel, titled Netflix & Chills Meet Dr. Elvira.
