= Flesh and Bullets =

1985 film

- Directed by: Carlos Tobalina
- Written by: Carlos Tobalina
- Produced by: Carlos Tobalina
- Starring: Glenn McKay; Gail Sterling; Mic Morrow; Cydney Hill
- Edited by: Carlos Tobalina
- Music by: Carlos Tobalina
- Release date: 1985
- Country: United States
- Language: English

Flesh and Bullets is a 1985 crime film written, produced, edited and directed by Carlos Tobalina. It features Yvonne De Carlo, Aldo Ray, Cesar Romero, Cornel Wilde, Colleen Brennan, Bill Cable, and Robert Z'Dar in minor roles.

== Cast ==
- Glenn McKay as Roy Hunter
- Gail Sterling as Gail Bordon (as Susan Silvers)
- Mic Morrow as Jeff Bordon
- Cydney Hill as Dolores Hunter
- Gina Tobalina as Dina
- Yvonne De Carlo as Judge in Los Angeles
- Aldo Ray as Lieutenant in Police Department
- Cesar Romero as Judge in Santa Monica
- Cornel Wilde as Captain of Police Department
- Colleen Brennan as Car Rental Agent (as Sharon Kelly)
- Bill Cable as Policeman
- Michael Demers as Bill
- Mike Andrew as Motorcycle Police Officer
- Maria Tobalina as Mrs. Wilson
- Robert Z'Dar as Don (as Robert West)

== Reception ==
A contemporary review published in Variety called the film an "amateurish effort", and noted that its "plot, thesping, sets and camerawork have to struggle to come up to adequate level; mostly they hover below the line." Lee Pfeiffer of Cinema Retro wrote that it is "hard to recommend Flesh and Bullets as mainstream entertainment but, as a retro curiosity of a director's bold but failed attempt to break into the mainstream, it is certainly worth a look."

== Home media ==
In 2015, the film was restored in 2K and released on DVD by Vinegar Syndrome.
