= Jungle Blue =

1978 American pornographic film

- Theatrical release poster
- Directed by: Carlos Tobalina
- Starring: Kathie Kori; Nina Fause; Bill Cable
- Cinematography: Fernando Fortes
- Release date: 1978
- Running time: 79 minutes
- Country: United States
- Language: English

Jungle Blue is a 1978 American pornographic exploitation film directed by Carlos Tobalina under the pseudonym Troy Benny. The film stars Kathie Kori as Jane, a woman who journeys into the jungles of South America in search of her missing father, accompanied by explorers who secretly plan to steal jewels that they believe are being guarded by a native tribe. The other members of the cast include Nina Fause and Bill Cable.

== Cast ==
- Kathie Kori as Jane
- Nina Fause as Silvia
- Bill Cable as Evor (credited as Bigg John)
- Iris Medina as Rosa
- Jose Ferraro as Brad Johnson
- Hank Lardner as Hank

== Critical reception ==
Rod Barnett of Cinema Retro called the film "a damned mess from beginning to end with the only draw being the actual sex scenes." He wrote: "Everything is poorly done. The actors are mostly clueless, the script is a third-grader's idea of a dirty Tarzan story and the stupid 'steal the jewels' plot is dropped in so randomly halfway through the movie that it seems like a later addition to the whole thing."

== Home media ==
In 2014, the film was restored and released on DVD by Vinegar Syndrome.
