= Infrasexum =

1969 American pornographic film

- Theatrical release poster
- Directed by: Carlos Tobalina
- Written by: Carlos Tobalina
- Produced by: Carlos Tobalina
- Starring: Erroff Lynn; Carlos Tobalina; Marsha Jordan
- Cinematography: Fernando Fortes
- Production companies: C. Tobalina Productions, Inc.
- Distributed by: Hollywood International Film Corporation of America
- Release date: 1969
- Running time: 87 minutes
- Country: United States
- Language: English

Infrasexum is a 1969 American sexploitation film written, produced, edited and directed by Carlos Tobalina in his directorial debut. It stars Erroff Lynn as Peter Allison, an impotent middle-aged business executive who leaves his job and wife in search of liberation. The film's cast also includes Tobalina, Marsha Jordan, Maria Pia, William Larrabure, and Sharon Matt.

== Cast ==
- Erroff Lynn as Peter Allison
- Carlos Tobalina as Carlos
- Marsha Jordan as Mrs. Allison
- Maria Pia as Lisa
- Vincent Barbi as Kidnapper
- Anita de Moulin as Rosina
- Luis Varga as Louis - Kidnapper's Accomplice
- Kathy Ferrick as Brunette Woman
- William Larrabure as Dr. Davis
- Sharon Matt as Lori the Nude Model

== Critical reception ==
Lee Pfeiffer of Cinema Retro called the film "downright weird", writing: "Whatever early talent Tobalina might have conveyed on screen is compromised by the bare bones production budget, which was probably close to zero." He noted that the film would likely appeal to "baby boomer males who want a trip back in time to an era in which such fare was considered daring and controversial", and to fans of cult sexploitation films.

== Lawsuits ==
Infrasexum was brought to court in the state of Colorado on the charge of being "obscene material", but the court sided with defendant Tobalina. In response to the case, Tobalina filed a counterclaim against the prosecution, which included the mayor, state attorney general, and governor of Denver.

On June 27, 1970, manager Asa Lloyd Peoples and projectionist Gerald L. Brooke were arrested for screening Infrasexum in a Birmingham, Alabama movie theater. They were claimed to have violated two city ordinances regarding obscene material, and the film was seized and held as evidence to be used in their prosecution. Peoples, Brooke, and the company that owned the theater filed a lawsuit in federal district court, alleging that the ordinances in question were unconstitutional on account of their vague and broad natures, and for not providing accused parties with a proper hearing prior to their arrest or the material's seizure. The district court decided that Brooke would be enjoined from prosecution.

== Home media ==
In 2016, the film was restored in 2K and released on DVD by Vinegar Syndrome.
