= Vel Lewis =

- Born: Velbert Lewis, Jr. November 30, 1954 (age 71); Philadelphia, Pennsylvania, United States
- Genres: jazz
- Occupation: musician
- Instruments: organ, piano
- Website: vellewis.com

Velbert Lewis Jr. (born November 30, 1954) is an American contemporary jazz musician. His primary instrument of choice is the Hammond organ; however he also plays piano, synthesizer keyboards, drums, and electric bass guitar.

== Biography ==
Lewis was born in Philadelphia, Pennsylvania, and began his music career in 1965 as a 1st soprano vocalist with the Philadelphia All-Boys Choir under the direction of Dr. Carlton J. Lake. He attended Settlement Music School for vocal/piano training. He also began studies on concert flute. In 1966, he switched from flute to organ, and advanced to 1st soprano soloist in the Philadelphia All-Boys Choir Small Ensemble group.

In 1967, he traveled with the Philadelphia All-Boys Choir Small Ensemble to Montreal, Canada and appeared at Expo '67 as lead soloist. In 1968, he continued organ studies on the Hammond organ with Milton Myers, then with Dr. E. Woodley Kalehoff, Sr., White House pianist to U.S. President Harry Truman in 1969 for three years. He attended Overbrook High School between 1969 and 1972.

During these years, he performed on a televised jazz program playing organ with drummer Gerry Brown and bassist John Lee. He also recorded Hammond organ on gospel recording sessions for ABC's Peacock Record label with producer Ira Tucker, Sr. for albums by groups known as The Sensational Nightingales, The Gospelaires, and The Dixie Hummingbirds. In 1972, he was under recording contract with Philadelphia International Records, performing with a vocal group known as The Futures, which was known for their single, "Love Is Here".

In 1973, he performed and traveled with another vocal group known as The Delfonics and co-wrote and sang the opening lead on "Tell Me Why", a song released in 1974 on the Warner Bros. Reprise label by The Life Group (also known as Life). He also co-produced songs with jazz saxophonist Tom Borton on Borton's albums Dancing With Tigers (1990), and The Lost World (1992), both released under the Mesa/Bluemoon Recordings label.

In 1995, he began composing music as a songwriter for Los Angeles Post Music, a production music library founded by Borton. LA Post Music's tracks appear on TV shows Sex And The City, Friends, Mad About You, and The Fresh Prince of Bel-Air. Between the years 2003 through 2005, he performed on a World Tour with singer Dionne Warwick.

In 2005, he released his first solo debut album All Wound Up under the stage name of "Shady Grady". He composed eight of the ten songs and co-wrote the remaining two songs contained in this album. His song "Song For My Love" from his EP "Colors Of Soul" landed at #67 on the Groove Jazz Music "Top 100" list for 2014 with over 1,600 spins and 375,000 streams.

Lewis released the single "Forever More" in 2021, featuring Larry Braggs, formerly of Tower of Power and The Temptations.

The following year, he teamed up with guitarist and songwriter Michael Garvin to release two singles under their Garvel Music label. "PlayTyme" premiered on YouTube in May 2022 and entered the global Smooth Jazz Top 100 within seven weeks. Their second release, "Bossaflowz," launched in November. In June 2024, Vel was awarded the Houston Black Music Award for Best Jazz Male Performer by the Black Music Association and Academy of America.

== Awards ==
- Selected as official artist of Hammond Organ Company USA
- 2013: ASCAP Plus Award recipient (ASCAP), American Society of Composers & Publishers
- 2014: ASCAP Plus Award recipient (ASCAP), American Society of Composers & Publishers
- 2015: The Recording Academy (NARAS) Appreciation and Recognition Award of 10 Years
- 2024: Black Music Awards Best Jazz Male performer

== Discography ==
Albums

- 2005: "All Wound Up" by Shady Grady (Celebrity Status Entertainment Cat. #02097 00742; Writer/Composer, arranger, session musician, Executive Producer)
- 2012: "Vitamin D" (Velbert Lewis)
- 2013: "Maybe So" (Velbert Lewis)
- 2014: "Song For My Love" (Velbert Lewis)
- 2014: "Colors Of Soul" ( Velbert Lewis)
- 2014: "God Rest Ye Merry Gentlemen"(Velbert Lewis)
- 2015: "I Wanna Be Cool" (Velbert Lewis, released April 14, 2015)
- 2016 "Papa's Strut" (Velbert Lewis)
- 2018 "Houston Strong" (Velbert Lewis)

Compilation Appearances

- 2005: "After Hours Vol. 3 – More Northern Soul Masters from the vaults of Atlantic, Atco, Loma, Reprise & Warner Bros. Records 1965-1974 [VINYL]" (Compilation album – Warner Strategic Marketing #B0006Q2TU2)
- 2007: "Keepin It Mellow" (Compilation album – Soulvibe Recordings/Pinnacle Records Cat. # SVC04)
- 2011: "After Hours: The Collection – Northern Soul Masters" (Compilation album – Warner Brothers UK #B0058OACT2)

Songs Co-written

- "Tell Me Why" (with Keith Stafford): 45 RPM single by Life (Reprise Records, #REP1185).
- "Soul Central", "Swingopolis", "Cellophane Man" (with Tom Borton): Album entitled "The Lost World" (Mesa/Bluemoon Records Cat. #R2 79175; Co-producer, Co-writer, session musician).
- "The Magic Hour" (with Tom Borton): Album entitled "The Magic Hour" by Steve Allee (Noteworthy Records Cat. #NWR 9504; Co-writer, session musician).
- "Let It Ride", "Midnight Dreams", "Sunshine" (with Tyrone Peterson, Juanita, Dickens, Chaka Blackmon, Anson Dawkins): Album entitled "All Wound Up" by Shady Grady, "Keepin’ It Mellow" compilation album
- 2022 "Playtime" (Vel Lewis, Michael Garvin - Garvel Music)
- 2022 "Bossaflowz" (Vel Lewis, Han Kooreneef, Michael Garvin - Garvel Music)
- 2024 "I Paid The Price" (Vel Lewis, Adryan Russ)
