= Wakefield Poole's Bible =

Bible!
- Theatrical release poster by David Edward Byrd
- Directed by: Wakefield Poole
- Written by: Wakefield Poole
- Produced by: Marvin Shulman
- Starring: Bo White; Caprice Couselle; Georgina Spelvin; Nicholas Flammel; Brahm van Zetten; Gloria Grant
- Production company: Poolemar
- Release date: 1973
- Running time: 84 minutes
- Country: United States
- Language: English

Wakefield Poole's Bible (stylized on-screen as Wakefield Poole's Bible!, and often simply referred to as Bible!) is a 1973 American softcore pornographic anthology film written and directed by Wakefield Poole. The film presents the biblical stories of Adam and Eve, David and Bathsheba, and Samson and Delilah in the form of pornographic vignettes, and stars Bo White, Caprice Couselle, Georgina Spelvin, Nicholas Flammel, Brahm van Zetten, and Gloria Grant. It is the only straight pornographic film to be directed by Poole, who was primarily a director of gay pornography.

== Cast ==
- Bo White as Adam
- Caprice Couselle as Eve
- Georgina Spelvin as Bathsheba
- Robert Benes as Uriah
- Nancy Wachter as Handmaiden
- John Horn as David (credited as Nicholas Flammel)
- Brahm van Zetten as Samson
- Gloria Grant as Delilah
- Bonnie Mathais as Mary
- Dennis Wayne as Angel

Little people Willie and Kathy Hermine play Delilah's servants.

== Production ==
Writer-director Wakefield Poole avidly studied the Bible as a child, and wanted to tell three stories from the Old Testament from a female perspective, as he felt that biblical narratives often cast women in a negative light. He wanted to make the film without dialogue, instead staging it to a musical composition, à la "an adult Fantasia." Poole initially wanted to cast Charles Ludlam and Lola Pashalinski respectively as David and Bathsheba, but after encountering creative differences with Ludlam, Poole instead cast Georgina Spelvin as Bathsheba and his neighbor John Horn as David. In order to protect his career, Horn was credited as "Nicholas Flammel".

Candy Darling wanted the role of Mary in the film, but Poole cast Bonnie Mathais, a soloist with the American Ballet Theatre, as Mary instead. In his 2000 book Dirty Poole: The Autobiography of a Gay Porn Pioneer, Poole expressed regret for not having given Darling the part, writing: "To this day I'm sorry I didn't use her." Poole offered Gloria Grant, a waitress at a Steak and Brew he frequented, the part of Delilah after watching her "move gracefully through the tables", and she accepted.

Bible! was filmed in the Caribbean and in the United States on 16 mm. Scenes which take place in the Garden of Eden were shot on the island of Virgin Gorda in the British Virgin Islands. The David and Bathsheba segment was filmed in a large garage on Mulberry Street in Little Italy, Manhattan, and the final scenes featuring Mary were shot in Yuma, Arizona. Poole and producer Marvin Shulman spent over $100,000 to make the film.

== Marketing and release ==
According to the 2004 book Contemporary American Independent Film: From the Margins to the Mainstream by editors Chris Holmlund and Justin Wyatt, Bible! was advertised in mainstream publications, and elicited protests as a result. Press screenings were held, and the film was exhibited at the Lincoln Art Theatre in 35 mm, blown up from its original 16 mm format. The film ultimately performed poorly at the box office.

Several sources list the film's release year as 1973, including writer-director Poole and home video distributor Vinegar Syndrome. Other sources list the release year as 1974, and a 1973 issue of Cinefantastique lists a more specific release date of April 1974. The Cinefantastique listing is included under a disclaimer which notes Bible! as being among a number of films that were "in release during the rating period, [but] were seen by no one", indicating that "these films are in very limited release" or "have not been in release long enough to appear on the chart, but will be included in the future."

== Critical reception ==
Lee Pfeiffer of Cinema Retro wrote that the film "has some striking visual elements, some of them effective and creative and others bordering on the pretentious", and called it "one of the strangest film projects of its era." In his 2016 book Dirty Words and Filthy Pictures: Film and the First Amendment, writer Jeremy Geltzer called the film "the strangest genre-hybrid of the porno chic era, if not of all time".

== Home media ==
In 2013, the film was released on DVD by Vinegar Syndrome.
