= Boys in the Sand =

1971 film by Wakefield Poole

- Ad for the film
- Directed by: Wakefield Poole
- Written by: Wakefield Poole
- Produced by: Wakefield Poole; Marvin Shulman
- Starring: Casey Donovan; Peter Fisk; Danny Di Cioccio; Tommy Moore
- Distributed by: Poolemar
- Release date: December 29, 1971
- Running time: 90 minutes
- Country: United States
- Language: English
- Budget: $8,000 USD (estimated)

Boys in the Sand is a landmark American gay pornographic film, released early in the Golden Age of Porn. The 1971 film was directed by Wakefield Poole and stars Casey Donovan. It was the first gay porn film to include credits and to be reviewed by the film industry journal Variety, and one of the earliest porn films to gain mainstream credibility and attention, after Andy Warhol's 1969 film Blue Movie, but preceding 1972's Deep Throat.

Produced on a budget of about $8,000, the film collects three segments depicting Donovan's sexual adventures at a gay beach resort. Promoted by Poole with an advertising campaign unprecedented for a pornographic feature, it premiered in 1971 at the 55th Street Playhouse in Manhattan, where it was an immediate critical and commercial success. The film brought Donovan international recognition. A sequel Boys in the Sand II was released in 1986, but in the much-changed film and porn markets did not match the success of the original.

The film's title is a parodic reference to the 1968 Mart Crowley play The Boys in the Band, which had been adapted into a 1970 film of the same name.

== Plot ==
Boys in the Sand is composed of three segments set on Fire Island.

- Bayside: Dark-haired, bearded Peter Fisk walks along the wooded paths of the island until reaching a beach. He strips and sits on blanket, watching the sea intently. Suddenly, out in the water, blond naked Casey Donovan appears and runs up onto the beach to Fisk. Fisk performs oral sex on Donovan, who then leads Fisk into the woods. Fisk grabs the blanket and follows, catching up to Donovan in a clearing. They kiss and touch each other, then Donovan takes a studded leather strap from Fisk's wrist and attaches it around Fisk's genitalia. They continue the scene, with each performing oral sex on the other and Donovan penetrating Fisk. Following Donovan's climax he returns to servicing Fisk orally and, as Fisk is climaxing, momentary flashes of previous scenes are intercut. The scene ends with Fisk taking the strap from his genitals and attaching it around Donovan's wrist. Fisk runs into the ocean and vanishes, mirroring Donovan's entrance. Donovan dons Fisk's abandoned clothes and heads off down the beach.
- Poolside: The segment opens with Donovan on a pier, holding a newspaper. He returns to his house, strips by the pool and begins reading. Intrigued by an ad in the back of the paper, Donovan writes a letter in response. After a number of days pass (marked by fluttering calendar pages), he receives a reply in the form of a package. Inside is a tablet, which he throws into the pool. The water starts to churn and dark-haired Danny Di Cioccio emerges to Donovan's delight. The two couple by the pool, with each performing oral sex on the other and Donovan penetrating Di Cioccio in a variety of positions. Di Cioccio turns the tables and tops Donovan until Donovan's climax. The scene closes with the two engaged in horseplay in the pool and then walking off together down a boardwalk.
- Inside: This final segment opens with shots of Donovan showering, toweling off and wandering idly around his room, intercut with shots of African-American telephone repairman Tommy Moore checking various poles and lines outside. Donovan spots Moore from his balcony, and Moore sees Donovan as well. The remainder of the segment consists of Donovan's fantasized sexual encounters with Moore throughout the house intercut with shots of Donovan sniffing poppers and penetrating himself with a large black dildo. The segment ends following Donovan's climax with the dildo, with the real Moore coming inside the house and closing the door behind them.

== Production ==
Wakefield Poole was inspired to make the film after he went with some friends to see a film titled Highway Hustler. After watching the film, he said to a friend "This is the worst, ugliest movie I've ever seen! Somebody oughta be able to do something better than this." Poole stated "I wanted [to make] a film that gay people could look at and say 'I don't mind being gay - it's beautiful to see those people do what they're doing.'" Having enlisted the help of his lover Peter Fisk and another man, Poole first shot a 10-minute segment titled Bayside.

The success of that initial shoot convinced Poole to plan two more segments and seek theatrical distribution for the completed work. He hired Tommy Moore and Casey Donovan for the third segment, Inside. When Fisk's scene partner from Bayside heard about the potential distribution deal, he refused to sign release forms until he was guaranteed 20% of the profits. Instead, Poole decided to scrap the segment and re-shoot with Fisk and Donovan. The resulting footage was so good that Poole decided to use Donovan for the second segment as well, titled Poolside, and he constructed the loose storyline around him. The three segments were filmed on a budget of $8,000 over three successive weekends in August 1971 in the gay resort area of Cherry Grove, New York.

== Popular and critical reception ==
Original newspaper ad for the film

Boys in the Sand had its theatrical debut on December 29, 1971, at the 55th Street Playhouse in New York City. Poole engaged in an unprecedented pre-release publicity campaign, including screening parties and full-page ads in The New York Times and Variety.

The line, for the first showing, reached 7th Avenue. The film made back most of its production and promotions budget the day it opened, grossing close to $6,000 in the first hour, and nearly $25,000 during its first week, landing it on Variety's list of the week's 50 top-grossing films. Positive word of mouth spread, and the film was reviewed favorably in Variety ("There are no more closets!"), The Advocate ("Everyone will fall in love with this philandering fellator"), and other outlets, which previously had completely ignored the genre. While some critics were less impressed, others saw the film as akin to the avant-garde work of directors like Kenneth Anger and Andy Warhol. Within six months, the film had grossed $140,000 and opened in theatres across the United States and around the world.

The film's mainstream popularity helped usher in the era of "porno chic," a brief period of mainstream cultural acceptability afforded hardcore pornographic film, having been cited as "very much a precursor" to the following year's crossover success of Deep Throat. The film attracted critical and scholarly attention from pornography historians and researchers for years after its release. The film is credited with beginning the trend of giving pornographic films titles that spoof the names of non-porn films.

With the success of Boys in the Sand, Casey Donovan became an underground celebrity. While he never achieved a mainstream film career, he continued his career in pornography and translated his fame into some appearances on the legitimate stage, including a successful national tour in the gay-themed play Tubstrip and an unsuccessful attempt to produce a revival of The Ritz. His fame also allowed him success as a high-priced prostitute. He remained a bankable commodity in the adult industry, making films for the next 15 years until his death from AIDS-related illness in 1987.

== Legacy ==
Poole and Donovan had wanted to make a sequel to Boys in the Sand. In 1984, they shot Boys in the Sand II. Also filmed on Fire Island, the film featured Donovan, the only cast member from the original to return. The original opening sequence, Bayside, was recreated for the sequel, with Pat Allen performing the run from the water. Litigation tied up the release of Boys in the Sand II until 1986 and with the advent of the home video market, there was a glut of gay porn titles available. Boys in the Sand II did not distinguish itself from the competition and was not particularly successful.

In 2002, TLA Releasing released The Wakefield Poole Collection. The two-DVD set includes Boys in the Sand and Boys in the Sand II along with Bijou (1972), a third Poole/Donovan collaboration, and other shorts and material shot by Poole. The collection won a 2003 GayVN Award for Best Classic Gay DVD.

In May 2014, filmmaker and writer Jim Tushinski's full-length documentary I Always Said Yes: The Many Lives of Wakefield Poole, which features extensive interviews with Poole, producer Marvin Schulman, and many contemporaries, began playing at film festivals. In June 2014, the DVD company Vinegar Syndrome restored Boys in the Sand from the remaining film elements and released this new version on DVD along with early short films by Wakefield Poole and several documentary shorts about the filming and reception of Boys in the Sand.

== See also ==
- LGBT culture in New York City
- List of American films of 1971
- List of LGBTQ people from New York City
- Sexual revolution in 1960s United States
- Timeline of 1960s counterculture
