= Elvira: Mistress of the Dark =

Elvira, Mistress of the Dark may refer to:

- Elvira, Mistress of the Dark, a horror host character portrayed by Cassandra Peterson
- Elvira: Mistress of the Dark (film), a comedy-horror movie about the character
- Elvira: Mistress of the Dark (video game), a survival horror video game

== See also ==
- Elvira: The Arcade Game, based on the film Elvira, Mistress of the Dark
