= Bijou (film) =

1972 film

- Theatrical release poster by Paul Jasmin
- Directed by: Wakefield Poole
- Produced by: Marvin Shulman
- Starring: Bill Harrison; Cassandra Hart; Lydia Black; Peter Fisk; Bill Cable
- Production company: Poolemar
- Release date: 1972
- Running time: 75 minutes
- Country: United States
- Language: English
- Budget: $22,000

Bijou is a 1972 American gay pornographic film directed and edited by Wakefield Poole and starring Bill Harrison as a construction worker who witnesses a car accident and discovers an invitation to a club called Bijou in the purse of the victim.

== Plot ==
The film begins on the streets of New York City, where a construction worker witnesses a woman getting hit by a car, which causes her purse to go flying. The construction worker steals it and makes a quick exit back to his apartment. He goes through the purse and discovers an invitation to an event listing an address, a time, and the word Bijou.

He decides to go to this mysterious event and is let in after handing over his stolen invitation. Upon entering, a neon light instructs him to take off his shoes and clothes, which he complies with. The place is dimly lit, and the remainder of the film consists of the construction worker having sex with multiple men.

== Cast ==
- Bill Harrison
- Cassandra Hart
- Lydia Black
- Peter Fisk
- Bill Cable
- Ronnie Shark
- Tom Bradford
- Robert Lewis
- Peter Schneckenburger
- Rocco Passalini
- Michael Green
- Bruce Shenton

== Production ==
Using some of the proceeds from his debut film Boys in the Sand, director Wakefield Poole bought a Beaulieu 16 mm camera for $10,000. Poole recorded screen tests of each actor he wanted to use, and had each of them "seduce the camera", undress, and masturbate to climax.

Poole shot the film over four days at his apartment. The interiors of the Bijou club were filmed in his living room; the crew covered the walls and floors with black felt and built a platform in the center of the room that was covered with black velvet. Poole edited the film over the summer of 1972.

== Release ==
Poole first screened Bijou during a weekend in August 1972. The film opened in October, with a 24-week run at the 55th Street Playhouse.

== Critical reception ==
A contemporary review in Variety called the film "part ersatz Kubrick, part raunchy Disney". Al Goldstein, editor of Screw, praised the film's "sophisticated direction, magnificent photography and editing". Bijou was named "Best Picture of 1972" by Screw, though it shared the honor with the film Deep Throat. According to Poole, Goldstein considered Bijou to be superior to Deep Throat, but did not want to "honor faggotry over heterosexuality".

When asked by Women's Wear Daily what his favorite thing he did on his visit to New York was, French fashion designer Yves Saint Laurent answered, "Seeing Bijou".

== Home media ==
In May 2014, the film was released on DVD by Vinegar Syndrome.
