= Tom Borton =

American saxophonist (1956–2011)

- Born: Thomas William Borton; January 4, 1956; Norristown, Pennsylvania, U.S.
- Died: July 26, 2011 (age 55) Los Angeles, California, U.S.
- Genre: Jazz
- Occupations: Musician, songwriter, composer
- Instrument: Saxophone
- Years active: 1981–2011

Thomas William Borton (January 4, 1956 – July 26, 2011) was an American jazz saxophonist, songwriter and composer, and was the founder and CEO of Los Angeles Post Music, Inc.

== Early life ==
Borton was born in Norristown, Pennsylvania to Robert G. and Phyllis M. (Phelps) Borton, and later on moved to Indianapolis, Indiana, where he grew up and began playing the saxophone at age 7. Borton attended Eastwood Junior High School, where he was a member of the school band; he won a talent show at a summer music camp held by Purdue University when he was in eighth grade.

While in high school, he played with Tarnished Silver, a band which featured R&B singer and songwriter Kenneth Edmonds, best known as Babyface, record producer Daryl Simmons, and drummer Rayford Griffin. Borton graduated from North Central High School in Indianapolis in 1974, and attended Indiana University Bloomington, where he joined a band called Streamwinner, which featured guitarist David Grissom, and drummer Kenny Aronoff.

== Music career ==
In 1981, Borton moved to Los Angeles, California, where he started writing for television and film music. In the summer of 1987, he joined The Big Picture band as a composer and played alto saxophone; the band also featured singer and songwriter Joanna St. Claire.

In 1990, Borton released his debut album Dancing With Tigers, which was co-produced with jazz musician Vel Lewis, and released under the Mesa/Bluemoon Recordings label; two of the songs from the album, "Wherever You Are" and "Looking for a Way", were both featured in the "Local Forecast" segments on The Weather Channel during the early 1990s. In 1992, Borton released his second album The Lost World, which was also co-produced with Lewis.

Borton also worked with jazz musician and composer Steve Allee, and co-produced two of his albums, The Magic Hour (1995), and Mirage (2003). In 2002, Borton and Allee both performed together at the Montreux Jazz Festival in Switzerland. Borton was the founder and CEO of Los Angeles Post Music, Inc, a production music library, in which he composed music for TV shows such as Friends, Sex and the City, The Sopranos, Lost and King of the Hill. He also composed music for the 1998 TV documentary Titanic: Secrets Revealed, and movies such as The Jitters (1989), and Amy's Orgasm (2001).

== Death ==
Borton died unexpectedly at his home in Los Angeles on July 26, 2011, at the age of 55. His third and final album, Simply One, was released posthumously in 2012. Borton was survived by his parents, his sisters, Rebecca Ann (William) Erdel, and Janis Elaine Borton, and his two nephews and great nieces.

== Discography ==
Albums

- 1990: Dancing With Tigers (Mesa/Bluemoon Recordings)
- 1992: The Lost World (Mesa/Bluemoon Recordings)
- 2012: Simply One

Compilation appearances

- 1990: Best of Mesa Records & Bluemoon Recordings (Mesa/Bluemoon Recordings) (features the song "Photoland" from Dancing With Tigers).
- 1992: The Best New Jazz in America: Volume 3 (Catalyst Communications/Encore Distributors Inc.) (features the song "Swingopolis" from The Lost World).
