= Clara Emilia Smitt =

Swedish doctor and author

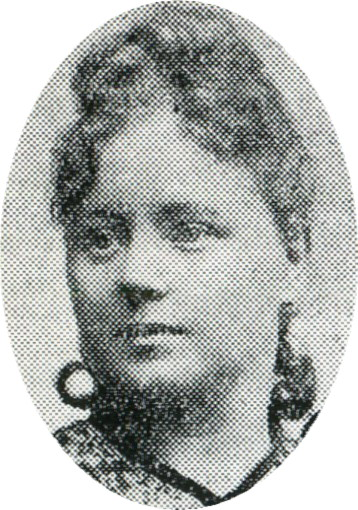
- Smitt in the 1890s
- Born: c. 1863; Stockholm, Sweden
- Died: 13 January 1928 (aged 64); Stockholm, Sweden
- Occupations: Doctor, author

Clara Emilia Smitt (c. 1863 – 13 January 1928) was a Swedish medical doctor and writer. Between 1896 and 1902 she ran Saltsjöbadens sanatorium in Saltsjöbaden.

== Early life and education ==
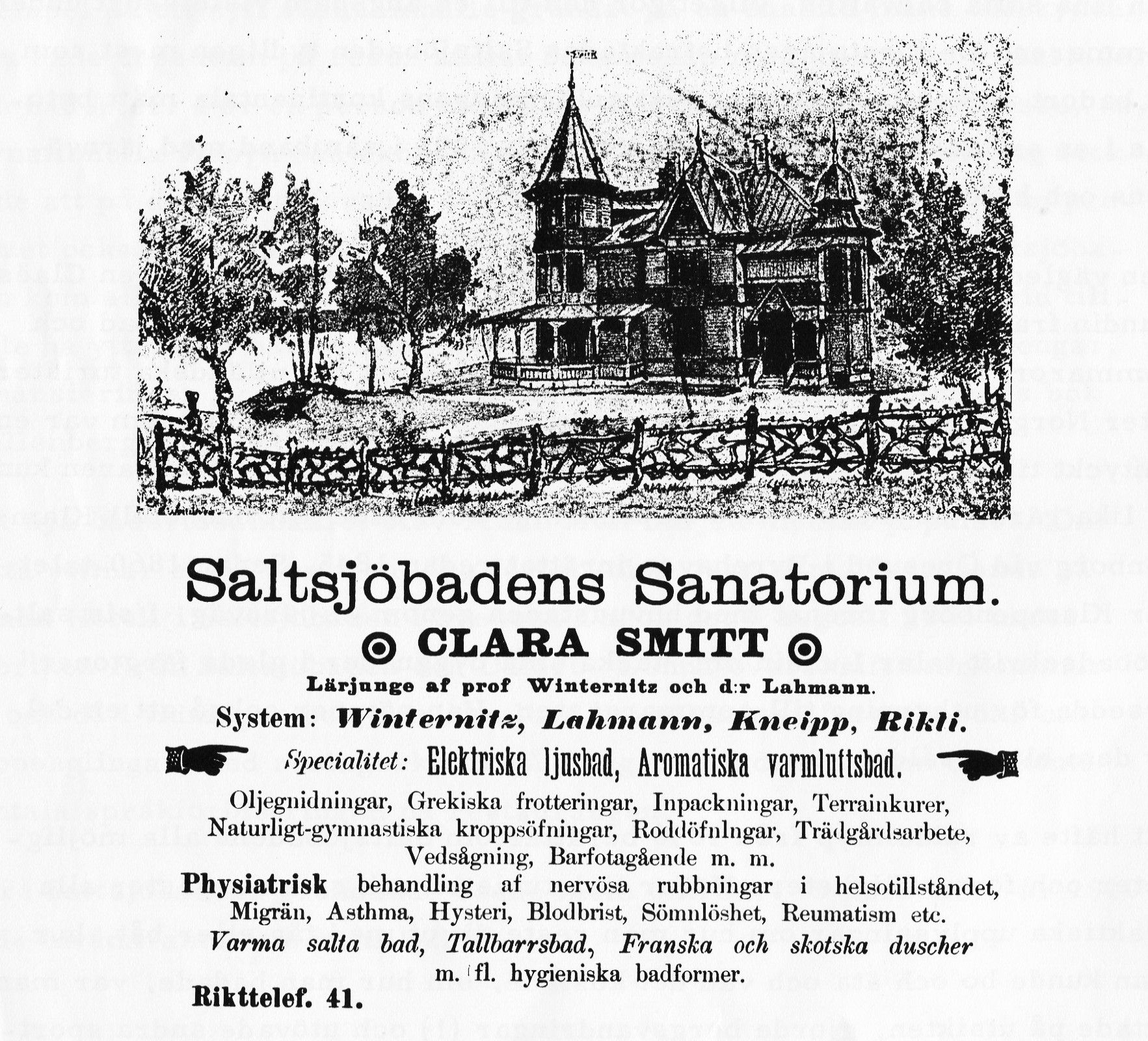
Saltsjöbadens sanatorium in Saltsjöbadens Tidning 1896

Born in Stockholm, Smitt grew up as a foster child to Clara Josefina Gustafsson who worked as a maid, and by 1890 she was registered as a student. She trained as a nurse and graduated from her class in 1892. In 1895, she moved to the recently built Saltsjöbaden in Nacka, where on 1 May she opened Saltsjöbadens sanatorium in a villa also called Malmska villan. She was later a nurse working during the Greco-Turkish War in 1897 and was in 1899 awarded a Red Cross medal in memory of her work during the war. She received the award from the Greek queen.

Smitt had passed the exam for hydrotherapy and received further training from the Austrian doctor Wilhelm Winternitz. She also studied medicine abroad, where she became interested in modern health methods including water and light therapy. She wanted to use her knowledge in Sweden, believing that diseases and sickness could be cured not only by medicines, but by healthy living such as diets, exercise and baths in different forms.

== Career ==
She was also one of Sweden's earliest women rights activists and wrote articles on the subject for the magazine Idun. And in 1897 she published a book called Kvinnans ställning i samhället: några inlägg i nutidens sociala spörsmål (Women's position in society: a few notes about contemporary social questions). In 1898, she published Helios, a magazine for spiritual and material well-being which was released for seven editions. In 1898, she married Erland Dryselius and afterwards changed her name to Clara Smitt-Dryselius.

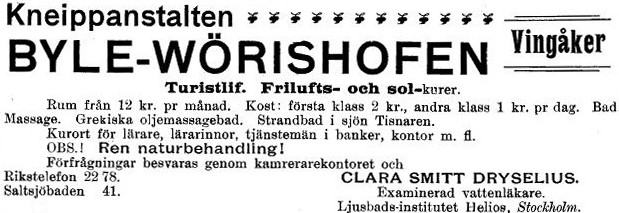
Ad from 1900

Economic hardship caused her to end her work at Saltsjöbaden in 1902. In December that year the couple moved to Vingåker in Södermanland County where they started running a water health spa called Byle-Wörishofen. By 1903, she also had started the light therapy institute Helios at Riddargatan in Stockholm. In 1911, she announced in the magazine Dagny that she was a bath/swimming doctor for the Electric Light Institute. By 1918, she was running a massage and light clinic at Råsunda. She died on 13 January 1928 and was buried on 20 January 1928.
