= James B. Campbell =

- Born: December 18, 1953 (age 72); United States
- Occupation: Percussionist

James B. Campbell (born December 18, 1953) is a performer, pedagogue, and author within the realm of percussion and is a respected figure in the development of the contemporary percussion ensemble. Campbell has toured extensively throughout the Americas, Europe, and Asia.

== Past associations ==
Campbell received both his Bachelor of Music in Music Education and his Master of Music in Percussion Pedagogue and Performance from Northern Illinois University. Beginning in 1984, he served as the principal instructor, arranger, and program coordinator for The Cavaliers Drum and Bugle Corps. Due to Campbell’s time with the Cavaliers he was inducted into the Drum Corps International Hall of Fame in 2008 as well as the Bands of America Hall of Fame in 2013. Campbell has also served as percussion director for the McDonald’s All-American High School Band and past president of the Percussive Arts Society. Among Campbell’s works for percussion, he has published with Hal Leonard Publishing, C.L. Barnhouse Co., C. Alan Publications, Innovative Percussion, Row-Loff Productions, Meredith Music, Alfred Publications, and Bachovich Music.

== Current affiliations ==
Campbell is a clinician for the Avedis Zildjian Company, artist for Yamaha Corporation of America, and endorsee for Innovative Percussion, Evans Drumheads, Meinl Percussion, and Black Swamp Percussion. Campbell is currently the drummer with the Kentucky Jazz Repertory Orchestra and is principal percussionist with the Lexington Philharmonic Orchestra. Campbell is also provost’s distinguished service professor of Music and Director of percussion studies at the University of Kentucky.
