= Joanna St. Claire =

- Origin: Los Angeles, California, United States
- Genres: Lyrical, Downtempo, World, Electronica, Rock
- Labels: Dreamtown Music
- Website: http://www.joannastclaire.com

Joanna St. Claire is a singer, songwriter, composer, and music producer born in the state of California and active in Los Angeles.

== Biography ==
Joanna St. Claire's projects fall into several categories. As a rock artist, she toured with the Lee Daniels Band in the United States and Canada. She was the lead singer and songwriter for several alternative-rock bands that she founded, including Autobahn, Vienna and The Big Picture. Her original work outside of bands includes collaborations with band member, saxophonist, songwriter and composer Tom Borton (her former fellow band member from The Big Picture), rock guitarist Jimmy Haun, drummer Stephen Klong and rock bassist Dave Meros. She worked with engineer Tom Davis, composer Scooter Pietch, writer Stephen Pouliot and composer Tim Truman.

Her work in the entertainment industry also includes singing, writing and producing original music for film and television for studios such as Showtime Television, Paramount Pictures and Columbia Pictures. One of her higher profile projects was the film Revenge, where she wrote, produced and performed original music used in the film, specifically the song Are You Ready and earned praise from the film's score composer, Jack Nitzsche. She also performed I Put A Spell On You in the 1988 film Elvira, Mistress of the Dark. Joanna’s work in musical theater includes having co-written two shows for musical theatre: Naked Ladies (a four-woman show that she also performed in, in Los Angeles) as well as the dance oriented musical Step by Step (also known as The Right Step) with Scott DeTurk.

Joanna St. Claire's finished writing, arranging, producing and performing an original CD entitled Stream in May 2010. Stream features performances by violinist Nimrod Nol, guitar work and vocals from Roberto Montero, percussion by M.B. Gordy and guitar, mandolin and Turkish saz performances by her husband Donny Ward. She shares mixing duties on the project with Per Lichtman, the Chief Mixing Engineer at Dreamtown Music, who succeeds his mentor Rob Woo in the position since 2007.

Joanna St. Claire collaborated with Swedish bassist, percussionist, multi-instrumentalist and composer Roine Sangenberg on both "An Angel's Longing" (first released in 2009 and then re-mastered in 2013) and "Mother Earth" in 2014.

In 2014 Joanna St. Claire was the featured vocalist on the Led Zeppelin cover "Kashmir" from guitarist, musician, composer, producer and arranger Piero Fabrizi's album Primula. Fabrizi praised her unique and charming performance.

Joanna St. Claire collaborated with composer, arranger Mario Stendardi and arranger Marco Pesci on the track "Sleep My Little One", released in 2012 and re-mastered in 2016.

"I Love You, Too" is a collaboration between Joanna and Julien Boulier Julien Boulier - Contact Info, Agent, Manager | IMDbPro - separated by space, but barely by Name... The piece began in Brest, France with Julien's piano and strings. Then it journeyed to Los Angeles, where Joanna wrote the lyrics and vocal line, before performing it at her studio at Dreamtown Music. Final production, mixing and mastering duties at the studio were shared by herself and Per Lichtman.

== Discography ==
=== Albums ===
Stream (2010)
Stream HD Master (2013)

=== Singles ===
I Love You, Too (2011)
O' Holy Night (2011)
Prayer Of Light (2012)
Mother Earth - California Mix (2014)
O Come, O Come, Emmanuel (2014)
An Angel's Longing (2015)
Sleep My Little One - Christmas Single (2016)
Loving Eyes (2017)
