= Kenn Duncan =

American photographer

Kenn Duncan (September 22, 1928 - July 27, 1986) was an American dance photographer.

== Biography ==
Kenneth Duncan was born September 22, 1928, in New Jersey. He began his career as a skater and then a dancer. After breaking his foot and taking a six-week course on photography at a YMCA, he became a photographer. Duncan worked as a principal photographer for After Dark and Dance Magazine. His photographs also regularly appeared in Vogue, Harper's Bazaar, Life, Time, and Newsweek. In addition, he photographed a score of Broadway shows, including Hair, Applause, The Elephant Man, and Sophisticated Ladies and many dance and Broadway stars including Chita Rivera, Tommy Tune, Jerry Herman, Mikhail Baryshnikov, Carol Channing and Angela Lansbury. Duncan also shot several album covers including Barry Manilow's debut album cover in 1973.

=== Death and afterward ===
Kenn Duncan died July 27, 1986, in New York Hospital of toxoplasmosis, a complication of AIDS.

Duncan's complete archive was acquired by the New York Public Library for the Performing Arts in 2003.

== Published works ==
- Nudes (Dance Magazine, 1970)
- More Nudes (Danad Pub. Co., 1971)
- Red Shoes (Universe, 1984)
