= Marie-Thérèse Letablier =

French sociologist (born 1947)

- Born: 4 January 1947 (age 79)

Academic work
- Main interests: Sociologist
- Notable works: Politiques sociales (Social policies)

Marie-Thérèse Letablier (born 4 January 1947), is a French sociologist. Her major sociological works concern work, family and gender issues. She is Research director in the French National Center for Scientific Research (CNRS) and a senior research fellow in the Paris Centre d’Economie de la Sorbonne (CES).

In 2008, Letablier was a member of the executive committee of the European Sociological Association (ESA) and a member of the Committee for Communications. ESA is an association aimed to facilitate sociological research, teaching and communication on European issues, and to build networks between European sociologists.

As a woman who has grown up during the seventies, she has developed research interests concerning family and gender issues. They have been mainly studied in a European comparative perspective. She has participated in several European research networks: on Families and Family Policies (for Sweden and France), on Gender and Employment (for Germany and France), on Social practices and Social Policies with regard to working and mothering, and on Childcare services.

In 2019, RN33 – Women's and Gender Studies celebrated its 10th anniversary. Letablier is a current member of the Research Network 33 Board.

== Selected works ==
=== Books ===
- Letablier, Marie-Thérèse; Hantrais, Linda (1996). Families and family policies in Europe. London, New York: Longman. ISBN 978-0-582-24767-3.
- Letablier, Marie-Thérèse; Fagnani, Jeanne (2001). Famille et travail: contraintes et arbitragese. Problèmes politiques et sociaux (in French). Paris, France: La documentation français. OCLC 47697644.
- Letablier, Marie-Thérèse; Barbier, Jean-Claude (2005). Politiques sociales (Social policies) (in French and English). Bruxelles, Bern, Berlin etc: PIE-P. Lang. ISBN 978-9-052-01420-3.

=== Chapters ===
- Letablier, Marie-Thérèse; Lanquetin, Marie-Thérèse; Laufer, Jacqueline (2000), "From equality to reconciliation in France?", in Hantrais, Linda (ed.), Gendered policies in Europe: reconciling employment and family life, New York: St. Martin's Press, pp. 68–88, ISBN 978-0-333-73982-2.
- Letablier, Marie-Thérèse; Fagnani, Jeanne (2005), "Social rights and care responsibility in the French welfare state", in Pfau-Effinger, Birgit; Geissler, Birgit (eds.), Care and social integration in European societies, Bristol, UK: Policy Press, pp. 153–172, ISBN 978-1-861-34604-9.
- Letablier, Marie-Thérèse; Fagnani, Jeanne (2005), "La politique familiale française", in Maruani, Margaret (ed.), Femmes, genre et sociétés: l'état des savoirs (in French), Paris: La Découverte, pp. 167–175, ISBN 978-2-707-14412-6.
- Letablier, Marie-Thérèse; Fagnani, Jeanne (2006), "The French 35–hour working law and the work-life balance of parents: friend or foe?", in Perrons, Diane; Fagan, Colette; McDowell, Linda; Ray, Kath; Ward, Kevin (eds.), Gender divisions and working time in the new economy: changing patterns of work, care and public policy in Europe and North America, Northampton, Massachusetts: E. Elgar, pp. 79–90, ISBN 978-1-847-20497-4

=== Journal articles ===
- Letablier, Marie-Thérèse (2001). "Work focussed on others and how it is conceptualized in Europe". Travail, Genre et Sociétés. 2 (6). La Découverte: 19–41. doi:10.3917/tgs.006.0019.
- Letablier, Marie-Thérèse; Fagnani, Jeanne (2003). "Qui s'occupe des enfants pendant que les parents travaillent? (Les enseignements d'une recherche auprès de parents de jeunes enfants)". Recherches et Prévisions (in French). 72: 21–35. doi:10.3406/caf.2003.1985.
- Letablier, Marie-Thérèse; Fagnani, Jeanne (2003). "S'occuper des enfants au quotidien: mais que font donc les pères?". Droit Social (in French). 3: 251–259.
- Letablier, Marie-Thérèse; Fagnani, Jeanne (January 2003). "La réduction du temps de travail a t-elle amélioré la vie quotidienne des parents de jeunes enfants?". Direction de l'Animation de la Recherche, des Études et des Statistiques (in French). 1–2. Premières Informations et Premières Synthèses. PDF
- Letablier, Marie-Thérèse; Fagnani, Jeanne (September 2004). "Work and family life balance: the impact of the 35-hour laws in France". Work, Employment & Society. 18 (3): 551–572. doi:10.1177/0950017004045550. S2CID 153378279.
- Letablier, Marie-Thérèse; Eydoux, Anne (June 2007). "Les familles monoparentales en France". Centre for Employment Studies (CEE) Research Report (in French). 36. Noisy-le-Grand, Seine-Saint-Denis: Center for Employment Studies.
