= Carlos Tobalina (filmmaker) =

Peruvian-born filmmaker and actor

- Born: Efrain Tobalina; 1925; Peru
- Died: March 31, 1989; Los Angeles, California, U.S.
- Occupations: Filmmaker, actor
- Years active: 1969–1987
- Spouse: Maria Pia Palfrader (m. 1964)
- Children: 1

Efrain "Carlos" Tobalina (1925 – March 31, 1989), also known as Carlos Tobalina and often credited as Troy Benny, was a Peruvian-born filmmaker and actor known for his work on pornographic films. He directed such films as Infrasexum (1969), Jungle Blue (1978), Three Ripening Cherries (1979), Sensual Fire (1980), and Flesh and Bullets (1985). He became the owner of several adult theaters, and was involved in court cases related to obscenity laws. In 1989, he was found dead from a self-inflicted gunshot wound to his head at one of his houses in Los Angeles.

== Early life ==
Tobalina was born in 1925 in Peru, and emigrated to Brazil and then to the United States in the early 1950s. He arrived in California in 1956, and over the next few years, he worked as both a car salesman at a number of car dealerships and a Spanish-language announcer.

== Career ==
In 1964, Tobalina founded C. Tobalina Productions, Inc., his film company. He made his debut as a film director and actor with the 1969 film Infrasexum. By the autumn of 1971, Tobalina had become the owner of the Mayan Theater in Los Angeles, California after purchasing it for around $300,000. Throughout the decade, Tobalina and his wife Maria Pia Palfrader took ownership of a few adult theaters, including the X Theater on Hollywood Boulevard and the Star Theater in La Puente.

=== Obscenity cases ===
As early as 1969, Tobalina hired lawyers to defend himself and his films from obscenity laws of the time. Infrasexum was brought to court in the state of Colorado on the charge of being "obscene material", but the court ultimately sided with Tobalina. After the case, Tobalina filed a counterclaim against the prosecution, which included the mayor, state attorney general, and governor of Denver. In 1970, a screening of Infrasexum in Birmingham, Alabama resulted in the arrest of a theater manager and a projectionist on account of allegedly violating city ordinances regarding obscene material.

In September 1971, the Los Angeles County Superior Court declared Tobalina guilty of violating a California Penal Code regarding the exhibition of obscene material for screening the 1971 film Januarius. Tobalina then hired lawyer Stanley Fleishman to appeal the ruling; Appeals were made to the Los Angeles County appellate court, which upheld the ruling, and the California Supreme Court, which declined to review the case. Fleishman then petitioned the U.S. Supreme Court. By 1973, after an increase in pornography-related court cases similar to those Tobalina was involved in, the U.S. Supreme Court redefined its definition of “obscenity” with the decision Miller v. California, from “utterly without socially redeeming value” to that which lacks “serious literary, artistic, political, or scientific value”.

== Personal life ==
Tobalina married a bookkeeper named Maria Pia Palfrader in 1964, becoming a stepfather to her young daughter Gloria. Two years later, in 1966, he and Maria had a daughter named Linda.

== Death ==
On March 31, 1989, Tobalina's wife Maria found him lying unresponsive in the enclosed back patio of one of his houses in the neighborhood of Pacific Palisades, Los Angeles. He was discovered with a .38 caliber Smith & Wesson revolver in his right hand, and was declared dead from a gunshot wound to the head. He had written a suicide note which explained that he was suffering from terminal liver cancer.

== Partial filmography ==
| Year | Film | Director | Writer | Producer | Actor | Notes | Ref(s) |
|---|---|---|---|---|---|---|---|
| 1969 | Infrasexum | Yes | Yes | Yes | Yes | | |
| 1970 | Double Initiation | Yes | Yes | Yes | Yes | | |
| 1975 | Marilyn and the Senator | Yes | Yes | Yes | | | |
| 1975 | Carnal Haven | Yes | Yes | Yes | | credited as Troy Benny | |
| 1976 | Her Last Fling | Yes | Yes | Executive | | as Bruce Van Buren and Troy Benny | |
| 1977 | The Ultimate Pleasure | Yes | Yes | Executive | | as Bruce Van Buren and Troy Benny | |
| 1977 | Fantastic Orgy | Yes | | | | as Troy Benny | |
| 1978 | Jungle Blue | Yes | | | | as Troy Benny | |
| 1978 | Champagne Orgy | Yes | | | Yes | as Troy Benny | |
| 1979 | Three Ripening Cherries | Yes | | | | as Troy Benny | |
| 1980 | Sensual Fire | Yes | Yes | | | as Troy Benny | |
| 1981 | Undulations | Yes | | | | as Troy Benny | |
| 1981 | Sexual Heights | Yes | | | | as Troy Benny | |
| 1981 | Anticipation | Yes | | | | as Troy Benny | |
| 1982 | Lust Inferno | Yes | | | | as Troy Benny | |
| 1982 | Marathon | Yes | | | Yes | as Troy Benny | |
| 1983 | My Sinful Life | Yes | | Yes | Uncredited | as Troy Benny | |
| 1983 | Las Vegas Girls | Yes | | | Uncredited | as Troy Benny | |
| 1983 | Lady Dynamite | Yes | | | Yes | as Troy Benny | |
| 1983 | Flesh Pond | Yes | | | Yes | as Troy Benny | |
| 1985 | Flesh and Bullets | Yes | Yes | Yes | | as Efrain Tobalina | |
| 1986 | Super Sex | Yes | Yes | | | as Troy Benny | |
| 1986 | Pulsating Flesh | Yes | | | Uncredited | as Troy Benny | |
