= Wakefield Poole =

American pornographic film director (1936–2021)

- Poole in 1974
- Born: Walter Wakefield Poole III; February 24, 1936; Salisbury, North Carolina, U.S.
- Died: October 27, 2021 (aged 85); Jacksonville, Florida, U.S.
- Education: French Culinary Institute
- Occupations: Dancer; filmmaker
- Years active: 1971–1985 (as filmmaker)
- Notable credit: Boys in the Sand

Walter Wakefield Poole III (February 24, 1936 – October 27, 2021) was an American dancer, choreographer, theatrical director, and pioneering film director in the gay pornography industry during the 1970s and 1980s.

== Biography ==
Poole was born in Salisbury, North Carolina, and was raised both there and in Jacksonville, Florida, where his family later moved.

He joined the Ballet Russe de Monte Carlo in 1957 and later became a dancer, choreographer, and director on television and Broadway. From 1964 to 1968, Poole was married to Nancy Van Rijn, a Broadway performer and choreographer.

In the late 1960s, Poole and his lover Peter Schneckenburger (later known as Peter Fisk, star of Boys in the Sand) began experimenting with film and multimedia shows, culminating in a multimedia gallery show for Broadway poster artist David Edward Byrd at the Triton Gallery in New York. Poole made his directorial film debut with Boys in the Sand (1971).

He and Boys in the Sand producer Marvin Shulman made another film the following year entitled Bijou, starring Bill Harrison. Having observed the success of Deep Throat, Poole's initial idea was to make a straight-porn movie in which a female fashion model goes to an anonymous sex club. But following the Commission on Obscenity and Pornography, set up by President Lyndon B. Johnson and continued by Richard Nixon, he decided to "stay in this small little genre" of gay porn. In place of the female model, the film portrays a male construction worker, who discovers an intriguing invitation to a club in the purse of a female hit-and-run victim.

Next, Poole and Shulman attempted to make a crossover film, Wakefield Poole's Bible, a trio of Old Testament stories focusing on female Biblical figures and starring Georgina Spelvin as a comic Bathsheba. The film was unsuccessful with audiences, though well received by the few critics who saw it. A number of Poole's films starred Casey Donovan, one of the best known porn stars of his time. One of them, Moving! (1974) challenged what Poole in a 1978 interview called the "middle-class values" of "the vast majority of gays" with its lengthy and graphic fisting scenes, which Poole considered important as "one interpretation of reality related man-to-man."

In the mid-1970s Poole, Peter Fisk, and Paul Hatlestad owned an art gallery and gift shop in San Francisco named Hot Flash of America.

Poole said that he stopped making films because of "the AIDS situation. I lost my fanbase to AIDS." In the same interview, Poole said that he had been a heavy cocaine user, and that "cocaine saved my life," because it made him unable to have sex. After his filmmaking career, he studied at the French Culinary Institute and worked in the food services industry until retiring to Jacksonville.

Poole appears as himself in the film documentaries Ballets Russes, That Man: Peter Berlin, and Where Ocean Meets Sky. In 2000, Alyson Books published his autobiography Dirty Poole: the Autobiography of a Gay Porn Pioneer, which was reprinted with a new afterword by Lethe Press in 2011.

A film documentary based on the autobiography, entitled I Always Said Yes: The Many Lives of Wakefield Poole, was directed and produced by Jim Tushinski (director of That Man: Peter Berlin) in 2013.

Poole died at a nursing home in Jacksonville on October 27, 2021, at age 85.

== Partial filmography ==
- Boys in the Sand (1971)
- Bijou (1972)
- Wakefield Poole's Bible (1973)
- Moving! (1974)
- Take One (1977)
- Hot Shots (1981)
- The Hustlers (1984)
- Split Image (1984)
- Boys in the Sand II (1984) / Pirated version Men In The Sand
- One, Two, Three (1985)

The Wakefield Poole Collection was released on DVD in 2002. The two-disk set includes Boys in the Sand, Bijou, and Boys in the Sand II along with several shorts, director commentaries, image galleries and an interview with the director. This DVD set is now out of print. Moving! and One, Two, Three... were remastered and released in 2011 on a single DVD by Gorilla Factory Productions. In December 2013, the home video distribution company Vinegar Syndrome began restoring and releasing Poole's films from the original surviving elements in definitive versions on DVD. They started with Wakefield Poole's Bible, which had never been available on home video before, and throughout 2014 released fully restored versions of Bijou and Boys in the Sand, followed by a double-feature DVD set including Take One and Moving! in 2016.

== Other notable achievements ==
- Dirty Poole: A Sensual Memoir (Book, Lethe Press, 2011, originally published by Alyson Publications in 2000)
- Bring Back Birdie [Original, Musical, Comedy] Video sequences created by Wakefield Poole; Associate to the Director: Wakefield Poole. March 5, 1981 - March 7, 1981
- Dear World [Original, Musical] Assistant to Mr. Layton: Wakefield Poole. February 6, 1969 - May 31, 1969
- George M! [Original, Musical, Comedy] Assistant to Mr. Layton: Wakefield Poole. April 10, 1968 - April 26, 1969
- Do I Hear a Waltz? [Original, Musical] Choreographic Associate: Wakefield Poole. March 18, 1965 - September 25, 1965
- The Girl Who Came to Supper [Original, Musical] Assistant to Mr. Layton: Wakefield Poole. December 8, 1963 - March 14, 1964
- No Strings [Original, Musical] Performer: Wakefield Poole [Dancer]; Dance Captain: Wakefield Poole. March 15, 1962 - August 3, 1963
- No Strings London Company Directed/ Restaged by Wakefield Poole (1963)
- The Unsinkable Molly Brown [Original, Musical, Comedy] Performer: Wakefield Poole [Dancer] - Replacement; Performer: Wakefield Poole [Denver Policeman] - Replacement. November 3, 1960 - February 10, 1962
- Tenderloin [Original, Musical, Comedy] Performer: Wakefield Poole [Dancer] October 17, 1960 - April 23, 1961
- Finian's Rainbow [Revival, Musical, Comedy] Performer: Wakefield Poole [Dancer]
- Dancer in The Ballet Russe Ballets Russes, An ode to the revolutionary 20th-century dance troupe known as the Ballets Russes. What began as a group of Russian refugees who never danced in Russia became not one but two rival dance troupes who fought the infamous "ballet battles" that consumed London society before World War II, released 2005

== Awards ==
GayVN Awards Hall of Fame
2003
